= 2021 Turkish Women's Cup squads =

List of players competing at the 5th edition of the Turkish Women's Cup

This article lists the squads for the 2021 Turkish Women's Cup, the 5th edition of the Turkish Women's Cup. The cup consisted of a series of friendly games, and was held in Turkey from 17 to 23 February 2021. The seven national teams and one domestic team involved in the tournament registered a squad of 23 players.

The age listed for each player is on 17 February 2021, the first day of the tournament. The numbers of caps and goals listed for each player do not include any matches played after the start of tournament. The club listed is the club for which the player last played a competitive match prior to the tournament. The nationality for each club reflects the national association (not the league) to which the club is affiliated. A flag is included for coaches that are of a different nationality than their own national team.

== Group A ==
=== CSKA Moscow ===
Coach: Maksim Zinovyev

Note: Flags indicate national team as defined under FIFA eligibility rules; some limited exceptions apply. Players may hold more than one non-FIFA nationality.

No.	Pos.	Nation	Player
4	DF	RUS	Anastasia Karandashova
5	MF	RUS	Alina Koroleva
7	FW	CMR	Gabrielle Onguéné
8	MF	RUS	Dayana Kishmakhova
9	MF	RUS	Veronica Ermakova
11	FW	UKR	Tetyana Kozyrenko
14	MF	RUS	Tatiana Petrova
15	MF	RUS	Ekaterina Bratko
17	MF	RUS	Daria Yakovleva

No.	Pos.	Nation	Player
19	MF	RUS	Taisiya Razorotneva
21	FW	RUS	Lyubov Yashchenko
23	DF	RUS	Olga Chernova
27	DF	RUS	Maria Alekseeva
29	GK	RUS	Anastasiia Ananjeva
31	DF	RUS	Margarita Manuylova
74	GK	RUS	Elizaveta Shcherbakova
88	MF	RUS	Anastasia Pozdeeva (captain)

=== Equatorial Guinea ===
Coach: (Republic of the Congo) Jean-Paul Mpila

No.	Pos.	Player	Date of birth (age)	Club
1	GK	Dolores Hernández	24 October 2001 (aged 19)	(Equatoguinean Football Federation) Super Leonas
2	DF	Angelina Obono	17 June 2002 (aged 18)	(Equatoguinean Football Federation)
3	FW	Salomé Nke (captain)	8 June 1989 (aged 31)	(Equatoguinean Football Federation) Malabo Kings
4	DF	Constantina Asú		(Equatoguinean Football Federation)
5	DF	Constancia Nchama	22 October 2001 (aged 19)	(Equatoguinean Football Federation)
6	MF	Nuria Baita	7 June 1999 (aged 21)	(Equatoguinean Football Federation) Malabo Kings
7	FW	Claudia Teresa Mayé	7 January 2006 (aged 15)	(Equatoguinean Football Federation) Atlético Malabo
8	DF	Restituta Abeme	25 February 2002 (aged 18)	(Equatoguinean Football Federation) Malabo Kings
9	MF	Ana María Nchama	17 May 1999 (aged 21)	(Equatoguinean Football Federation)
10	DF	Pachu	6 March 1986 (aged 34)	(Royal Spanish Football Federation) El Gancho
11	FW	Berta Okomo	7 November 2005 (aged 15)	(Equatoguinean Football Federation)
12	MF	Celestina Manga	12 May 1999 (aged 21)	(Equatoguinean Football Federation) Malabo Kings
13	GK	Emiliana Nchama	24 October 1986 (aged 34)	(Equatoguinean Football Federation) Malabo Kings
14	MF	Ramona Mibuy	28 June 2002 (aged 18)	(Equatoguinean Football Federation) Malabo Kings
15	DF	Agapita Avosogo	5 May 2000 (aged 20)	(Equatoguinean Football Federation) Inter Malabo
16	MF	Catalina Andeme	14 July 1999 (aged 21)	(Equatoguinean Football Federation) Deportivo Evinayong
17	MF	Diana Meriva	3 March 2002 (aged 18)	(Equatoguinean Football Federation) Inter Malabo
19	DF	Cecilia Akeng	8 November 2002 (age 23)	(Equatoguinean Football Federation) Deportivo Evinayong
20	MF	Cernuda Juliana Nchama		(Equatoguinean Football Federation)
21	DF	Avelina Abang	8 December 2003 (aged 17)	(Equatoguinean Football Federation) Malabo Kings

=== Nigeria ===
Coach: (United States) Randy Waldrum

The squad was announced on 11 February 2021. On 13 February 2021, Rasheedat Ajibade and Christy Ucheibe withdrew due to administrative reasons while Chiamaka Nnadozie and Ngozi Okobi-Okeoghene were exempt on health grounds.

No.	Pos.	Player	Date of birth (age)	Club
1	GK	Tochukwu Oluehi	2 May 1987 (aged 33)	(Royal Spanish Football Federation) Pozoalbense
2	FW	Gift Monday	9 December 2001 (aged 19)	(Nigeria Football Federation) Robo
3	DF	Osinachi Ohale	21 December 1991 (aged 29)	(Royal Spanish Football Federation) Madrid CFF
4	DF	Glory Ogbonna	25 December 1998 (aged 22)	(Nigeria Football Federation) Edo Queens
5	DF	Onome Ebi	8 May 1983 (aged 37)	Unattached
6	FW	Charity Adule	7 November 1993 (aged 27)	(Royal Spanish Football Federation) Eibar
7	DF	Mariam Ibrahim	12 December 1995 (aged 25)	(Nigeria Football Federation) Nasarawa Amazons
8	FW	Asisat Oshoala (captain)	9 October 1994 (aged 26)	(Royal Spanish Football Federation) Barcelona
9	MF	Toni Payne	22 April 1995 (aged 25)	(Royal Spanish Football Federation) Sevilla
10	MF	Rita Chikwelu	6 March 1988 (aged 32)	(Royal Spanish Football Federation) Madrid CFF
11	MF	Esther Sunday	13 March 1992 (aged 28)	(Turkish Football Federation) ALG Spor
12	FW	Uchenna Kanu	20 June 1997 (aged 23)	(Swedish Football Association) Linköpings
13	DF	Habeebat Akinwande		(Nigeria Football Federation) Robo
14	DF	Chidinma Okeke	11 August 2000 (aged 20)	(Royal Spanish Football Federation) Madrid CFF
15	MF	Patricia George	18 December 1996 (aged 24)	(German Football Association) SC Sand
16	GK	Christy Ohiaeriaku	13 December 1996 (aged 24)	(Nigeria Football Federation) Edo Queens
17	FW	Francisca Ordega	19 October 1993 (aged 27)	Unattached
18	MF	Halimatu Ayinde	16 May 1995 (aged 25)	(Swedish Football Association) Eskistuna United
19	FW	Chinwendu Ihezuo	30 April 1997 (aged 23)	Unattached
20	MF	Ramat Ohunene Abdulkareem	23 September 1999 (aged 21)	(Turkish Football Federation) Adana İdman Yurdu

=== Uzbekistan ===
Coach: Vadim Abramov

The squad was announced on 12 February 2021.

No.	Pos.	Player	Date of birth (age)	Caps	Goals	Club
1	GK	Laylo Tilovova (captain)	8 March 1997 (aged 23)	8	0	(Uzbekistan Football Association) Sevinch
2	DF	Zukhra Abdurakhimova				(Uzbekistan Football Association) Navbahor Namangan
3	DF	Dilrabo Asadova				(Uzbekistan Football Association) Bunyodkor
4	DF	Yulduz Nabieva	21 November 1995 (aged 25)			(Uzbekistan Football Association) Metallurg Bekabad
5	DF	Laylo Shodieva	26 March 2000 (aged 20)	2	0	(Uzbekistan Football Association) Sevinch
6	FW	Diyora Juraboeva				
7	FW	Nilufar Kudratova	5 June 1997 (aged 23)	8	5	(Uzbekistan Football Association) Sevinch
8	MF	Malika Burkhonova	22 February 1999 (aged 21)	8	0	(Uzbekistan Football Association) Sevinch
9	FW	Dildora Ergasheva	18 March 1999 (aged 21)			(Uzbekistan Football Association) Lokomotiv Tashkent
10	MF	Nozima Kamoltoeva	19 September 1998 (aged 22)	3	0	(Uzbekistan Football Association) Metallurg Bekabad
11	DF	Maftuna Shoyimova	1 January 1999 (aged 22)	10	0	(Uzbekistan Football Association) Sevinch
12	GK	Maftuna Jonimqulova	26 July 1999 (aged 21)	3	1	(Uzbekistan Football Association) Sevinch
14	DF	Yulduz Hamdamova				(Uzbekistan Football Association) Pakhtakor Tashkent
15	MF	Umida Zoirova	22 April 1998 (aged 22)	9	3	(Uzbekistan Football Association) Bunyodkor
16	MF	Ezoza Sharipova	11 June 1996 (aged 24)			(Uzbekistan Football Association) Sogdiana
17	MF	Lianna Narbekova	6 June 1997 (aged 23)	6	2	(Uzbekistan Football Association) Sogdiana
18	MF	Nelufar Dadajanova				(Uzbekistan Football Association) Navbahor Namangan
19	MF	Madina Vokhidova				(Uzbekistan Football Association) Pakhtakor Tashkent
20	DF	Ogiloy Ilasheva				(Uzbekistan Football Association) AGMK
21	DF	Kamila Zaripova	19 November 1998 (aged 22)	6	0	(Uzbekistan Football Association) AGMK
22	MF	Dildora Nozimova	3 November 1997 (aged 23)	6	7	(Uzbekistan Football Association) Bunyodkor
23	FW	Diyorakhon Khabibullaeva	15 September 1999 (aged 21)	4	5	(Uzbekistan Football Association) Sogdiana

== Friendlies ==
=== India ===
Coach: Maymol Rocky

The squad was announced on 12 February 2021.

No.	Pos.	Player	Date of birth (age)	Club
2	DF	Ngangbam Sweety Devi	1 December 1999 (aged 21)	(All India Football Federation) KRYPHSA
3	DF	Wangkhem Linthoingambi Devi	1 March 1995 (aged 25)	(All India Football Federation) KRYPHSA
4	DF	Loitongbam Ashalata Devi	3 July 1993 (aged 27)	(All India Football Federation) Sethu
5	DF	Thounaojam Kritina Devi	10 February 2003 (aged 18)	(All India Football Federation) Young Welfare
6	MF	Sangita Basfore (captain)	12 July 1996 (aged 24)	(All India Football Federation) Sashastra Seema Bal
7	FW	Sandhiya Ranganathan	20 May 1996 (aged 24)	(All India Football Federation) Sethu
8	FW	Karishma Purushottam Shirvoikar	4 August 2001 (aged 19)	(All India Football Federation) Gokulam Kerala
9	FW	Anju Tamang	22 December 1995 (aged 25)	(All India Football Federation) KRYPHSA
10	MF	Pyari Xaxa	18 May 1997 (aged 23)	(All India Football Federation) Rising Student's
11	FW	Grace Dangmei	5 February 1996 (aged 25)	(All India Football Federation) KRYPHSA
12	FW	Indumathi Kathiresan	5 June 1994 (aged 26)	(All India Football Federation) Tamil Nadu
13	MF	Sumithra Kamaraj	5 July 1994 (aged 26)	(All India Football Federation) Sethu
14	DF	Sorokhaibam Ranjana Chanu	10 March 1999 (aged 21)	(All India Football Federation) KRYPHSA
15	FW	Soumya Guguloth	18 July 2001 (aged 19)	(All India Football Federation) Kenkre
16	MF	Manisha Kalyan	27 November 2001 (aged 19)	(All India Football Federation) Gokulam Kerala
17	FW	Heigrujam Daya Devi	4 April 2000 (aged 20)	(All India Football Federation) Gokulam Kerala
18	FW	Sumati Kumari	15 January 2004 (aged 17)	(All India Football Federation) Jharkhand
19	GK	Maibam Linthoingambi Devi	2 February 1999 (aged 22)	(All India Football Federation) KRYPHSA
20	GK	Sowmiya Narayansamy	25 July 2000 (aged 20)	(All India Football Federation) Sethu
22	DF	Ritu Rani	25 May 1997 (aged 23)	(All India Football Federation) Alakhpura

=== Russia ===
Coach: Yuri Krasnozhan

The squad was announced on 11 February 2021.

No.	Pos.	Player	Date of birth (age)	Club
1	GK	Tatyana Shcherbak	22 October 1997 (aged 23)	(Russian Football Union) Krasnodar
2	DF	Anastasiya Akimova	12 May 1991 (aged 29)	(Russian Football Union) Zvezda-2005 Perm
3	DF	Anna Kozhnikova (captain)	10 July 1987 (aged 33)	(Russian Football Union) Lokomotiv Moscow
4	MF	Ekaterina Tyryshkina	31 January 1996 (aged 25)	(French Football Federation) Le Havre
5	MF	Yana Sheina	23 June 2000 (aged 20)	(Russian Football Union) Lokomotiv Moscow
6	FW	Marina Kiskonen	19 March 1994 (aged 26)	(Royal Spanish Football Federation) Alavés
7	MF	Maria Galay	14 October 1992 (aged 28)	(Russian Football Union) Lokomotiv Moscow
8	DF	Alsu Abdullina	11 April 2001 (aged 19)	(Russian Football Union) Lokomotiv Moscow
9	DF	Ksenia Tsybutovich	26 June 1987 (aged 33)	(Russian Football Union) Zenit Saint Petersburg
10	MF	Nadezhda Smirnova	22 February 1996 (aged 24)	(Russian Football Union) CSKA Moscow
11	MF	Elina Samoylova	26 February 1995 (aged 25)	(Russian Football Union) Lokomotiv Moscow
12	GK	Elvira Todua	31 January 1986 (aged 35)	(Russian Football Union) CSKA Moscow
13	FW	Tatyana Morina	9 July 1993 (aged 27)	(Russian Football Union) Zenit Saint Petersburg
14	DF	Kristina Mashkova	30 June 1992 (aged 28)	(Russian Football Union) Lokomotiv Moscow
16	MF	Valeriya Bespalikova	15 January 1999 (aged 22)	(Russian Football Union) CSKA Moscow
17	MF	Ekaterina Pantyukhina	9 April 1993 (aged 27)	(Russian Football Union) Zenit Saint Petersburg
18	MF	Veronika Kuropatkina	3 September 1999 (aged 21)	(Russian Football Union) Zenit Saint Petersburg
19	MF	Margarita Chernomyrdina	26 March 1996 (aged 24)	(Russian Football Union) CSKA Moscow
20	FW	Nelli Korovkina	1 November 1989 (aged 31)	(Russian Football Union) Lokomotiv Moscow
21	GK	Yulia Grichenko	10 March 1990 (aged 30)	(Russian Football Union) Zenit Saint Petersburg
22	MF	Viktoriya Kozlova	21 December 1995 (aged 25)	(Russian Football Union) Lokomotiv Moscow
23	FW	Natalia Mashina	28 March 1997 (aged 23)	(Russian Football Union) Zenit Saint Petersburg
	DF	Anna Belomyttseva	24 November 1996 (aged 24)	(Russian Football Union) Lokomotiv Moscow
	MF	Marina Fedorova	10 May 1997 (aged 23)	(Russian Football Union) Lokomotiv Moscow
	DF	Ekaterina Morozova	26 March 1991 (aged 29)	(Russian Football Union) Zenit Saint Petersburg

=== Serbia ===
Coach: Predrag Grozdanović

The squad was announced on 14 February 2021.

No.	Pos.	Player	Date of birth (age)	Club
1	GK	Milica Kostić	21 December 1997 (aged 23)	(Football Association of Serbia) Spartak Subotica
2	DF	Aleksandra Lazarević	29 November 1995 (aged 25)	(Russian Football Union) Ryazan-VDV
3	DF	Anđela Frajtović	8 July 2000 (aged 20)	(Football Association of Serbia) Spartak Subotica
4	MF	Emilija Zivković	18 April 2000 (aged 20)	(Football Association of Serbia) Sloga Zemun
5	DF	Tijana Janković	19 May 1996 (aged 24)	(Football Association of Serbia) Sloga Zemun
6	DF	Nevena Damjanović (captain)	12 April 1993 (aged 27)	(Portuguese Football Federation) Sporting CP
7	MF	Milica Mijatović	26 June 1991 (aged 29)	(Swedish Football Association) Häcken
8	MF	Dina Blagojević	15 March 1997 (aged 23)	(German Football Association) SC Sand
9	FW	Nina Matejić	8 February 2005 (aged 16)	(Football Association of Serbia) Požarevac
10	MF	Jelena Čanković	13 August 1995 (aged 25)	(Swedish Football Association) Rosengård
11	FW	Jovana Brusin	3 November 1999 (aged 21)	(Football Association of Serbia) Sloga Zemun
12	GK	Sara Cetinja	16 April 2000 (aged 20)	(French Football Federation) Nancy
13	DF	Ana Scepanović	24 May 1999 (aged 21)	(Football Association of Serbia) Red Star
14	DF	Biljana Bradić	24 April 1991 (aged 29)	(Hungarian Football Federation) Diósgyőr
15	DF	Jovana Miladinović	16 April 2000 (aged 20)	(Football Association of Serbia) Red Star
16	DF	Isidora Vucković	9 May 1999 (aged 21)	(Football Association of Serbia) Mašinac
17	FW	Allegra Poljak	5 February 1999 (aged 22)	(Royal Spanish Football Federation) Tenerife
18	MF	Ivana Trbojević	26 July 2000 (aged 20)	(Football Association of Serbia) Kanjiža
19	FW	Marija Vuković	25 March 1990 (aged 30)	(Football Association of Serbia) Požarevac
20	MF	Tijana Filipović	26 May 1999 (aged 21)	(Football Association of Serbia) Spartak Subotica
21	MF	Tijana Matić	22 February 1996 (aged 24)	(Russian Football Union) Ryazan-VDV
22	FW	Milica Stanković	4 March 1991 (aged 29)	(Football Association of Serbia) Mašinac
23	GK	Jovana Petrović	11 September 2001 (aged 19)	(Football Association of Serbia) Red Star

=== Ukraine ===
Coach: Natalya Zinchenko

The squad was announced on 9 February 2021.

No.	Pos.	Player	Date of birth (age)	Club
1	GK	Daryna Bondarchuk	20 May 1998 (aged 22)	(Ukrainian Association of Football) Zhytlobud-2 Kharkiv
2	DF	Iryna Podolska	14 March 1995 (aged 25)	(Ukrainian Association of Football) Zhytlobud-2 Kharkiv
3	MF	Anna Petryk	26 October 1997 (aged 23)	(Ukrainian Association of Football) Zhytlobud-1 Kharkiv
4	DF	Anastasia Filenko	1 November 1990 (aged 30)	(Ukrainian Association of Football) Zhytlobud-2 Kharkiv
5	MF	Veronika Andrukhiv	5 May 1996 (aged 24)	(Ukrainian Association of Football) Zhytlobud-2 Kharkiv
6	DF	Olha Basanska	6 January 1992 (aged 29)	(Ukrainian Association of Football) Zhytlobud-1 Kharkiv
7	FW	Yana Kalinina	14 November 1994 (aged 26)	(Ukrainian Association of Football) Zhytlobud-2 Kharkiv
8	FW	Olha Boychenko	6 January 1989 (aged 32)	(Ukrainian Association of Football) Zhytlobud-1 Kharkiv
9	FW	Nicole Kozlova	8 July 2000 (aged 20)	(United States Soccer Federation) Virginia Tech Hokies
10	FW	Hanna Voronina	17 April 1992 (aged 28)	(Ukrainian Association of Football) Zhytlobud-1 Kharkiv
11	MF	Viktoriya Hiryn	24 October 2000 (aged 20)	(Ukrainian Association of Football) Ladomyr Volodymyr-Volynskyi
12	GK	Iryna Sanina	8 October 1985 (aged 35)	(Ukrainian Association of Football) Zhytlobud-1 Kharkiv
13	DF	Natia Pantsulaia	28 December 1991 (aged 29)	(Ukrainian Association of Football) Zhytlobud-2 Kharkiv
14	DF	Lyubov Shmatko	25 October 1993 (aged 27)	(Ukrainian Association of Football) Zhytlobud-1 Kharkiv
15	MF	Iya Andrushchak	13 March 1987 (aged 33)	(Ukrainian Association of Football) Zhytlobud-2 Kharkiv
16	MF	Olha Ovdiychuk	16 December 1993 (aged 27)	(Ukrainian Association of Football) Zhytlobud-1 Kharkiv
17	MF	Daryna Apanashchenko (captain)	16 May 1986 (aged 34)	(Ukrainian Association of Football) Zhytlobud-1 Kharkiv
18	DF	Kateryna Korsun	28 August 1995 (aged 25)	(Ukrainian Association of Football) Zhytlobud-2 Kharkiv
19	FW	Roksolana Kravchuk	7 November 1997 (aged 23)	(Ukrainian Association of Football) Zhytlobud-2 Kharkiv
20	MF	Yana Malakhova	17 February 1995 (aged 25)	(Ukrainian Association of Football) Zhytlobud-2 Kharkiv
21	MF	Tamila Khimich	13 September 1994 (aged 26)	(Croatian Football Federation) Split
22	DF	Darya Kravets	21 March 1994 (aged 26)	(French Football Federation) Reims
23	GK	Kateryna Samson	5 July 1988 (aged 32)	(Ukrainian Association of Football) Zhytlobud-2 Kharkiv
24	MF	Tetyana Kitayeva	28 October 1995 (aged 25)	(Ukrainian Association of Football) Zhytlobud-2 Kharkiv

== Player representation ==
The information represents only the seven national teams taking part in the competition.

=== By club ===
Clubs with 4 or more players represented are listed.

Players	Club
12	(Ukraine) Zhytlobud-2 Kharkiv
10	(Russia) Lokomotiv Moscow
8	(Ukraine) Zhytlobud-1 Kharkiv
7	(Russia) Zenit Saint Petersburg
6	(Equatorial Guinea) Malabo Kings, (India) KRYPHSA, (Uzbekistan) Sevinch
4	(India) Sethu, (Russia) CSKA Moscow

=== By club nationality ===
Players	Clubs
25	Russia
21	Ukraine, Uzbekistan
20	India
14	Serbia
10	Spain
9	Equatorial Guinea
5	Nigeria
4	Sweden
3	France
2	Germany, Turkey
1	Croatia, Hungary, Portugal, United States

=== By club federation ===
Players	Federation
84	UEFA
41	AFC
14	CAF
1	CONCACAF

=== By representatives of domestic league ===
National squad	Players
Russia	23
Ukraine	21
Uzbekistan	21
India	20
Serbia	14
Equatorial Guinea	9
Nigeria	5
