= 2017 Russian Women's Football Championship =

Russian Women's Football Championship
- Season: 2017
- Dates: 18 April – 2 November
- Champions: Zvezda 2005 Perm
- Champions League: Zvezda 2005 Perm; Ryazan VDV
- Matches: 56
- Goals: 145 (2.59 per match)
- Top goalscorer: Elena Danilova (11 goals)

The 2017 Russian Women's Football Championship was the 26th season of the Russian women's football top level league. WFC Rossiyanka were the defending champions.

== Teams ==
Location of teams

| Team | Location | Stadium | Capacity |
|---|---|---|---|
| Chertanovo | Moscow | Arena Chertanovo | 490 |
| CSKA | Moscow | Rodina Stadium, Khimki | 5,083 |
| CSKA | Moscow | Yantar Stadium | 2,000 |
| CSKA | Moscow | Oktyabr Stadium | 3,060 |
| Donchanka | Azov | Stadium SDYuShOR-9 | 1,000 |
| Donchanka | Azov | Lokomotiv Stadium, Bataysk | |
| Kubanochka | Krasnodar | Trud Stadium | 3,000 |
| Kubanochka | Krasnodar | Kuban Stadium | 35,200 |
| Rossiyanka | Khimki | Rodina Stadium | 5,083 |
| Rossiyanka | Khimki | Salyut Stadium, Dolgoprudny | |
| Rossiyanka | Khimki | Novye Khimki Stadium | 3,066 |
| Ryazan VDV | Ryazan | Spartak Stadium | 6,000 |
| Yenisey | Krasnoyarsk | Football-Arena Yenisey | 3,000 |
| Zvezda 2005 | Perm | Zvezda Stadium | 17,000 |

== League table ==
| Pos | Team | Pld | W | D | L | GF | GA | GD | Pts | Qualification |
|---|---|---|---|---|---|---|---|---|---|---|
| 1 | Zvezda 2005 Perm | 14 | 11 | 2 | 1 | 32 | 7 | +25 | 35 | Qualification to Champions League |
| 2 | Ryazan VDV | 14 | 9 | 4 | 1 | 29 | 11 | +18 | 31 | Qualification to Champions League |
| 3 | Chertanovo Moscow | 14 | 9 | 2 | 3 | 20 | 12 | +8 | 29 | |
| 4 | CSKA Moscow | 14 | 9 | 1 | 4 | 25 | 14 | +11 | 28 | |
| 5 | Kubanochka Krasnodar | 14 | 3 | 4 | 7 | 13 | 19 | −6 | 13 | |
| 6 | Rossiyanka | 14 | 2 | 3 | 9 | 11 | 28 | −17 | 9 | |
| 7 | Yenisey Krasnoyarsk | 14 | 2 | 1 | 11 | 5 | 25 | −20 | 7 | |
| 8 | Donchanka Azov | 14 | 1 | 3 | 10 | 10 | 29 | −19 | 6 | |

Source: soccerway.com
Rules for classification: 1) Points; 2) Number of wins; 3) Head-to-head points; 4) Head-to-head wins; 5) Head-to-head goal difference; 6) Head-to-head goals; 7) Head-to-head away goals; 8) Goal difference; 9) Goals scored; 10) Drawing of lots

== Results ==
| Home \ Away | CHE | CSK | DON | KUB | ROS | RYA | YEN | ZVE |
|---|---|---|---|---|---|---|---|---|
| Chertanovo Moscow | — | 0–3 | 4–1 | 2–0 | 1–0 | 2–2 | 1–0 | 2–1 |
| CSKA Moscow | 1–0 | — | 3–0 | 2–1 | 2–1 | 0–2 | 5–1 | 1–4 |
| Donchanka Azov | 0–1 | 1–2 | — | 1–3 | 2–2 | 1–1 | 1–1 | 0–1 |
| Kubanochka Krasnodar | 1–3 | 1–1 | 3–2 | — | 1–1 | 0–0 | 1–0 | 0–1 |
| Rossiyanka | 0–2 | 0–2 | 1–0 | 2–2 | — | 0–7 | 1–0 | 0–2 |
| Ryazan VDV | 3–1 | 3–1 | 4–1 | 1–0 | 2–1 | — | 1–0 | 1–1 |
| Yenisey Krasnoyarsk | 0–1 | 0–1 | 0–1 | 1–0 | 2–0 | 0–1 | — | 0–2 |
| Zvezda 2005 Perm | 0–0 | 1–0 | 2–0 | 2–0 | 3–2 | 3–1 | 9–0 | — |

Source: soccerway.com
Legend: Blue = home team win; Yellow = draw; Red = away team win.

== Top scorers ==
| Rank | Player | Team | Goals |
|---|---|---|---|
| 1 | (Russia) Elena Danilova | Ryazan VDV | 11 |
| 2 | (Russia) Olesya Kurochkina | Zvezda 2005 Perm | 9 |
| 2 | (Cameroon) Gabrielle Onguéné | CSKA Moscow | 9 |
| 2 | (Russia) Ekaterina Pantyukhina | Zvezda 2005 Perm | 9 |
| 5 | (Ukraine) Daryna Apanaschenko | Zvezda 2005 Perm | 5 |
| 5 | (Russia) Margarita Chernomyrdina | Chertanovo | 5 |
| 5 | (Russia) Maria Galay | Zvezda 2005 Perm | 5 |
| 5 | (Russia) Marina Kiskonen | Chertanovo | 5 |
| 9 | 6 players | | 4 |

=== Hat-tricks ===
| Player | For | Against | Result | Date | Ref. |
|---|---|---|---|---|---|
| (Russia) Olesya Kurochkina^{4} | Zvezda 2005 Perm | Yenisey | 9–0 (h) | 15 May 2017 | |
| (Russia) Ekaterina Pantyukhina | Zvezda 2005 Perm | Yenisey | 9–0 (h) | 15 May 2017 | |
| (Russia) Elena Danilova^{4} | Ryazan VDV | Rossiyanka | 7–0 (a) | 13 August 2017 | |
| (Cameroon) Gabrielle Onguéné | CSKA Moscow | Yenisey | 5–1 (h) | 9 September 2017 | |
| (Russia) Maria Galay | Zvezda 2005 Perm | Ryazan VDV | 3–1 (h) | 10 September 2017 | |

^{4} Player scored 4 goals
