= 2018 Russian Women's Football Championship =

Russian Women's Football Championship
- Season: 2018
- Dates: 18 April – 23 October
- Champions: Ryazan-VDV (4th title)
- Champions League: Ryazan-VDV; Chertanovo
- Matches: 56
- Goals: 133 (2.38 per match)
- Best player: Elena Danilova
- Top goalscorer: Elena Danilova (11 goals)

The 2018 Russian Women's Football Championship was the 27th season of the Russian women's football top level league. Zvezda-2005 Perm were the defending champions.

== Teams ==
Location of teams

Team	Location	Stadium	Capacity
Chertanovo	Moscow	Arena Chertanovo	490
CSKA	Moscow	Oktyabr Stadium	3,060
Kubanochka	Krasnodar	Kuban Stadium	35,200
Lokomotiv	Moscow	Sapsan Arena	10,000
Ryazan-VDV	Ryazan	Spartak Stadium	6,000
Torpedo	Izhevsk	Kupol Stadium	3,000
Yenisey	Krasnoyarsk	Football-Arena Yenisey	3,000
Zvezda-2005	Perm	Zvezda Stadium	17,000

== League table ==
Pos	Team	Pld	W	D	L	GF	GA	GD	Pts	Qualification
1	Ryazan-VDV	14	10	3	1	21	3	+18	33	Qualification to Champions League
2	Chertanovo	14	8	2	4	22	20	+2	26	Qualification to Champions League
3	Zvezda-2005	14	8	1	5	21	14	+7	25	
4	CSKA	14	7	4	3	20	10	+10	25	
5	Kubanochka	14	6	2	6	17	14	+3	20	
6	Lokomotiv	14	5	5	4	22	8	+14	20	
7	Yenisey	14	2	3	9	9	21	−12	9	
8	Torpedo	14	0	0	14	1	43	−42	0	

Source: RFS
Rules for classification: 1) Points; 2) Number of wins; 3) Head-to-head points; 4) Head-to-head wins; 5) Head-to-head goal difference; 6) Head-to-head goals; 7) Head-to-head away goals; 8) Goal difference; 9) Goals scored; 10) Drawing of lots

== Results ==
Home \ Away	CHE	CSK	KUB	LOK	RYA	TOR	YEN	ZVE
Chertanovo	—	1–0	2–0	1–0	1–2	3–0	3–1	2–1
CSKA	1–1	—	2–1	1–1	0–1	4–0	3–0	2–0
Kubanochka	2–1	3–1	—	0–1	0–0	4–0	1–0	0–3
Lokomotiv	7–1	0–0	0–1	—	0–1	5–0	1–1	2–0
Ryazan-VDV	1–1	0–1	1–0	0–0	—	4–0	1–0	3–0
Torpedo	0–2	0–2	1–4	0–4	0–2	—	0–3	0–2
Yenisey	1–2	1–2	1–1	0–0	0–3	1–0	—	0–2
Zvezda-2005	4–1	1–1	1–0	2–1	0–2	3–0	2–0	—

Source: RFS
Legend: Blue = home team win; Yellow = draw; Red = away team win.

== Top scorers ==
Rank	Player	Team	Goals
1	(Russia) Elena Danilova	Ryazan-VDV	11
2	(Russia) Marina Kiskonen	Chertanovo	8
3	(Russia) Nelli Korovkina	Chertanovo	7
4	(Russia) Ekaterina Pantyukhina	Zvezda-2005	5
4	(Russia) Nadezhda Smirnova	CSKA	5
6	Seven players		4

=== Hat-tricks ===
Player	For	Against	Result	Date
(Russia) Elena Danilova	Ryazan-VDV	Zvezda-2005	3–0 (h)	30 June 2018
