= 2019 Russian Women's Football Championship =

Russian Women's Football Championship
- Season: 2019
- Dates: 11 April – 23 November
- Champions: CSKA Moscow (1st title)
- Champions League: CSKA Moscow
- Matches: 82
- Goals: 223 (2.72 per match)
- Best Player: Nadezhda Smirnova
- Top goalscorer: Nelli Korovkina (20 goals)

The 2019 Russian Women's Football Championship was the 28th season of the Russian women's football top level league. Ryazan-VDV were the defending champions.

== Teams ==
Location of teams

Team	Location	Stadium	Capacity
Chertanovo	Moscow	Arena Chertanovo	490
CSKA	Moscow	Oktyabr Stadium	3,060
CSKA	Moscow	Novye Khimki Stadium, Khimki	3,066
Kubanochka	Krasnodar	Andrey Arena, Afipsky	
Kubanochka	Krasnodar	Kuban Stadium	35,200
Lokomotiv	Moscow	Sapsan Arena	10,000
Ryazan-VDV	Ryazan	Spartak Stadium	6,000
Torpedo	Izhevsk	Kupol Stadium	3,000
Yenisey	Krasnoyarsk	Football-Arena Yenisey	3,000
Zvezda-2005	Perm	Zvezda Stadium	17,000

== League table ==
Pos	Team	Pld	W	D	L	GF	GA	GD	Pts	Qualification
1	CSKA	21	18	2	1	52	8	+44	56	Champions League qualifying round
2	Lokomotiv	21	14	2	5	50	12	+38	44	
3	Kubanochka	21	10	5	6	22	22	0	35	
4	Zvezda-2005	21	9	4	8	31	20	+11	31	
5	Ryazan-VDV	21	8	7	6	25	20	+5	31	
6	Chertanovo	21	5	5	11	25	37	−12	20	
7	Yenisey	21	3	3	15	16	44	−28	12	
8	Torpedo	21	1	4	16	8	66	−58	7	

Source: RFS
Rules for classification: 1) Points; 2) Number of wins; 3) Head-to-head points; 4) Head-to-head wins; 5) Head-to-head goal difference; 6) Head-to-head goals; 7) Head-to-head away goals; 8) Goal difference; 9) Goals scored; 10) Drawing of lots

== Results ==
=== Matches 1–14 ===
Home \ Away	CHE	CSK	KUB	LOK	RYA	TOR	YEN	ZVE
Chertanovo		2–6	2–2	0–5	0–1	1–1	2–1	3–2
CSKA	3–1		2–0	1–0	4–0	4–0	4–0	3–1
Kubanochka	3–2	0–1		1–0	2–2	1–1	1–0	1–0
Lokomotiv	2–0	1–1	3–0		0–0	5–0	4–0	0–1
Ryazan-VDV	1–1	1–1	0–1	0–3		3–0	1–0	0–1
Torpedo	0–3	0–4	0–2	1–4	0–5		1–0	1–1
Yenisey	1–1	0–2	0–1	0–3	1–1	6–1		0–6
Zvezda-2005	2–2	1–2	0–0	0–1	0–0	2–0	1–0	

Source: RFS
Legend: Blue = home team win; Yellow = draw; Red = away team win.

=== Matches 15–21 ===
Home \ Away	CHE	CSK	KUB	LOK	RYA	TOR	YEN	ZVE
Chertanovo			0–1	1–0		3–0 (Note: Torpedo forfeited a match.)		
CSKA	2–0			0–1			2–0	2–0
Kubanochka		0–2			2–0	3–0 (Note: Torpedo forfeited a match.)		1–2
Lokomotiv			5–0		0–2	7–0		
Ryazan-VDV	1–0	0–2					5–1	1–0
Torpedo		0–4			1–1			0–5
Yenisey	1–0		0–0	3–4		2–1		
Zvezda-2005	2–1			1–2			3–0	

Source: RFS
Legend: Blue = home team win; Yellow = draw; Red = away team win.

== Top scorers ==
Rank	Player	Team	Goals
1	(Russia) Nelli Korovkina	Lokomotiv	20
2	(Russia) Ksenia Tsybutovich	CSKA	11
3	(Russia) Ekaterina Pantyukhina	Zvezda-2005	10
4	(Russia) Nadezhda Smirnova	CSKA	9
4	(Russia) Olesya Kurochkina	Zvezda-2005	9
6	(Russia) Darya Yakovleva	CSKA	8
7	(Serbia) Marija Vuković	Ryazan-VDV	7

=== Hat-tricks ===
Player	For	Against	Result	Date
(Russia) Nelli Korovkina	Lokomotiv	Yenisey	4–0 (h)	7 June 2019
(Serbia) Marija Vuković	Ryazan-VDV	Torpedo	5–0 (a)	3 August 2019
(Russia) Nelli Korovkina^{4}	Lokomotiv	Kubanochka	5–0 (h)	8 September 2019

^{4} Player scored 4 goals
