= 2021 Russian Women's Football Championship =

Russian Women's Football Super League
- Season: 2021
- Dates: 13 March – 20 November
- Champions: Lokomotiv Moscow (1st title)
- Champions League: Lokomotiv Moscow
- Matches: 135
- Goals: 328 (2.43 per match)
- Top goalscorer: Nelli Korovkina (20 goals)

The 2021 Russian Women's Football Super League (Чемпионат России по футболу среди женских команд – Cуперлига-2021) was the 30th season of the Russian women's football top-level league. CSKA Moscow were the defending champion.

== Teams ==
Location of teams

Team	Location	Stadium	Capacity
Chertanovo	Moscow	Arena Chertanovo	490
CSKA	Moscow	Oktyabr Stadium	3,060
CSKA	Moscow	VEB Arena	30,457
Krasnodar	Krasnodar	Krasnodar Academy Stadium	3,500
Lokomotiv	Moscow	Sapsan Arena	10,000
Rostov	Rostov-on-Don	Trud Stadium	300
Rubin	Kazan	Rubin Stadium	
Ryazan-VDV	Ryazan	Spartak Stadium	6,000
Yenisey	Krasnoyarsk	Central Stadium	15,000
Yenisey	Krasnoyarsk	Football-Arena Yenisey	3,000
Zenit	Saint Petersburg	Smena Stadium	3,000
Zvezda-2005	Perm	Zvezda Stadium	17,000
Zvezda-2005	Perm	Indoor arena Perm Velikaya	3,000

== League table ==
Pos	Team	Pld	W	D	L	GF	GA	GD	Pts	Qualification
1	Lokomotiv Moscow (C)	27	23	1	3	76	8	+68	70	Champions League first round
2	CSKA Moscow	27	17	6	4	50	14	+36	57	
3	Zenit Saint Petersburg	27	15	5	7	40	23	+17	50	
4	Zvezda-2005 Perm	27	13	8	6	30	22	+8	47	
5	Rostov	27	11	6	10	23	27	−4	39	
6	Ryazan-VDV	27	10	5	12	32	26	+6	35	
7	Yenisey Krasnoyarsk	27	9	5	13	28	45	−17	32	
8	Chertanovo Moscow	27	8	6	13	21	32	−11	30	
9	Krasnodar	27	5	2	20	20	55	−35	17	
10	Rubin Kazan	27	2	0	25	8	76	−68	6	

Source: RFU
Rules for classification: 1) Points; 2) Head-to-head points; 3) Head-to-head wins; 4) Head-to-head goal difference; 5) Head-to-head goals; 6) Number of wins; 7) Goal difference; 8) Goals scored; 9) Drawing of lots
(C) Champions

== Results ==
Home \ Away	CHE	CSK	KRA	LOK	ROS	RUB	RYA	YEN	ZEN	ZVE	CHE	CSK	KRA	LOK	ROS	RUB	RYA	YEN	ZEN	ZVE
Chertanovo Moscow		2–1	1–0	0–1	0–1	2–0	0–0	2–3	1–3	2–1				0–1	0–1	1–0	2–1		0–1	
CSKA Moscow	1–0		4–2	0–1	1–0	7–0	1–1	3–0	2–0	1–1	2–0		2–1	2–0				2–0		3–1
Krasnodar	1–1	0–4		0–3	0–1	0–3	1–0	1–0	0–4	0–0	2–0			0–3	0–3			2–3		0–1
Lokomotiv Moscow	5–0	2–0	3–0		4–2	9–0	3–0	8–0	2–0	3–0					1–0	4–0	3–0		3–1	
Rostov	0–0	0–0	2–1	0–4		1–0	1–1	0–0	0–1	1–1		0–1				1–0	0–2		1–0	
Rubin Kazan	1–0	0–4	1–3	0–3	0–2		0–1	0–4	0–2	0–1		0–3	1–2				1–5	1–2	0–2	
Ryazan-VDV	2–0	0–1	3–1	1–2	4–1	2–0		2–1	0–1	0–1		1–1	2–0					0–0		0–1
Yenisey Krasnoyarsk	1–1	1–0	3–0	0–7	1–2	4–0	1–0		2–2	0–0	0–2			1–0	0–2					0–1
Zenit Saint Petersburg	1–1	1–1	2–1	0–1	3–0	3–0	2–1	3–0		1–2		0–0	3–1				0–3	2–0		
Zvezda-2005 Perm	1–2	0–3	2–1	0–0	1–0	4–0	1–0	2–1	0–1		1–1			1–0	1–1	4–0			1–1	

Source: RFU
Legend: Blue = home team win; Yellow = draw; Red = away team win.

== Top scorers ==
Rank	Player	Team	Goals
1	(Russia) Nelli Korovkina	Lokomotiv Moscow	20
2	(Russia) Olesya Kurochkina	Zvezda-2005 Perm	11
2	(Cameroon) Gabrielle Onguéné	CSKA Moscow	11
4	(Russia) Valentina Zhukova	Yenisey Krasnoyarsk	10
5	(Russia) Alena Ruzina	Lokomotiv Moscow	9
6	(Russia) Margarita Chernomyrdina	CSKA Moscow	8
6	(Russia) Polina Organova	Krasnodar	8
6	(Russia) Yana Sheina	Lokomotiv Moscow	8
9	(Russia) Ksenia Alpatova	Ryazan-VDV	7
9	(Russia) Nadezhda Smirnova	CSKA Moscow	7
