= 2020 Russian Women's Football Championship =

Annual soccer tournament

Russian Women's Football Super League
- Season: 2020
- Dates: 1 August – 22 November
- Champions: CSKA Moscow (2nd title)
- Champions League: CSKA Moscow; Lokomotiv Moscow
- Matches: 53
- Goals: 105 (1.98 per match)
- Best player: Nadezhda Smirnova
- Top goalscorer: Olesya Kurochkina (9 goals)

The 2020 Russian Women's Football Super League (Чемпионат России по футболу среди женских команд – Cуперлига-2020) was the 29th season of the Russian women's football top-level league. CSKA Moscow were the defending champions.

The tournament was supposed to start on March 29, but on March 17, due to the COVID-19 pandemic, the RFU decided to suspend all competitions under its auspices (include the Russian women's championship). The season was delayed until August 1, 2020.

== Teams ==
Location of teams

Team	Location	Stadium	Capacity
Chertanovo	Moscow	Arena Chertanovo	490
Chertanovo	Moscow	Yantar Stadium	2,000
CSKA	Moscow	Oktyabr Stadium	3,060
CSKA	Moscow	VEB Arena	30,457
Krasnodar	Krasnodar	Krasnodar Academy Stadium	3,500
Lokomotiv	Moscow	Sapsan Arena	10,000
Ryazan-VDV	Ryazan	Spartak Stadium	6,000
Yenisey	Krasnoyarsk	Central Stadium	15,000
Yenisey	Krasnoyarsk	Football-Arena Yenisey	3,000
Zenit	Saint Petersburg	Smena Stadium	3,000
Zvezda-2005	Perm	Zvezda Stadium	17,000
Zvezda-2005	Perm	Indoor arena Perm Velikaya	3,000

== League table ==
Pos	Team	Pld	W	D	L	GF	GA	GD	Pts	Qualification
1	CSKA Moscow (C)	14	10	3	1	20	9	+11	33	Qualification for the Champions League first round
2	Lokomotiv Moscow	14	9	5	0	26	6	+20	32	Qualification for the Champions League first round
3	Zvezda-2005 Perm	14	5	6	3	15	7	+8	21	
4	Ryazan-VDV	14	5	4	5	12	11	+1	19	
5	Zenit Saint Petersburg	14	4	3	7	14	14	0	15	
6	Krasnodar	14	3	5	6	14	19	−5	14	
7	Yenisey Krasnoyarsk	14	2	5	7	5	15	−10	11	
8	Chertanovo Moscow	14	2	1	11	8	33	−25	7	

Source: RFS
Rules for classification: 1) Points; 2) Head-to-head points; 3) Head-to-head wins; 4) Head-to-head goal difference; 5) Head-to-head goals; 6) Number of wins; 7) Goal difference; 8) Goals scored; 9) Drawing of lots
(C) Champions

== Results ==
Home \ Away	CHE	CSK	KRA	LOK	RYA	YEN	ZEN	ZVE
Chertanovo Moscow		1–2	3–0	1–3	0–1	0–1	0–4	0–5
CSKA Moscow	1–1		2–2	0–3	1–0	3–0	2–1	1–0
Krasnodar	4–0	1–2		0–3	2–0	0–0	0–3	1–1
Lokomotiv Moscow	5–1	0–0	1–0		2–2	1–0	2–0	1–0
Ryazan-VDV	2–0	0–1	1–2	0–0		1–1	1–0	0–0
Yenisey Krasnoyarsk	0–1	0–3	1–0	1–1	0–2		0–1	0–0
Zenit Saint Petersburg	3–0	0–1	2–2	0–3	0–1	0–0		0–0
Zvezda-2005 Perm	2–0	0–1	0–0	1–1	2–1	2–1	2–0	

Source: RFS
Legend: Blue = home team win; Yellow = draw; Red = away team win.

== Top scorers ==
Rank	Player	Team	Goals
1	(Russia) Olesya Kurochkina	Zvezda-2005	9
2	(Russia) Nelli Korovkina	Lokomotiv	8
3	(Cameroon) Gabrielle Onguéné	CSKA	7
4	(Russia) Elena Kostareva	Krasnodar	5
5	(Russia) Marina Fedorova	Lokomotiv	4
5	(Russia) Anna Kozhnikova	Lokomotiv	4
5	(Russia) Nadezhda Smirnova	CSKA	4
8	Four players		3

=== Hat-tricks ===
Player	For	Against	Result	Date
(Russia) Olesya Kurochkina	Zvezda-2005	Chertanovo	5–0 (a)	6 September 2020
(Russia) Nelli Korovkina	Lokomotiv	Chertanovo	5–1 (h)	11 October 2020
