= 2016 Russian Women's Football Championship =

Russian Women's Football Championship
- Season: 2016
- Dates: 29 April – 30 September
- Champions: WFC Rossiyanka
- UEFA Women's Champions League: WFC Rossiyanka • Zvezda 2005 Perm
- Matches: 45
- Goals: 120 (2.67 per match)
- Top goalscorer: Margarita Chernomyrdina & Nadezhda Karpova (8 goals each)

The 2016 Russian Women's Football Championship was the 25th season of the Russian women's football top-level league. Zvezda 2005 Perm were the defending champions.

WFC Rossiyanka won the championship, finishing ahead of Zvezda 2005 Perm.

== League table ==
Teams played each other three times.

Pos	Team	Pld	W	D	L	GF	GA	GD	Pts	Qualification
1	WFC Rossiyanka (C, Q)	15	11	2	2	25	9	+16	35	Qualification to Champions League
2	Zvezda 2005 Perm (Q)	15	8	2	5	24	13	+11	26	Qualification to Champions League
3	Ryazan VDV	15	7	4	4	21	18	+3	25	
4	FC Chertanovo Moscow	15	6	3	6	20	18	+2	21	
5	ZFK CSKA Moscow	15	4	3	8	17	25	−8	15	
6	Kubanochka Krasnodar	15	1	2	12	13	37	−24	5	

Source: soccerway.com
Rules for classification: 1) Points; 2) Number of wins; 3) Head-to-head points; 4) Head-to-head wins; 5) Head-to-head goal difference; 6) Head-to-head goals; 7) Head-to-head away goals; 8) Goal difference; 9) Goals scored; 10) Drawing of lots
(C) Champions; (Q) Qualified for the phase indicated

== Top scorers ==
Rank	Player	Club	Goals
1	(Russia) Margarita Chernomyrdina	FC Chertanovo Moscow	8
1	(Russia) Nadezhda Karpova	FC Chertanovo Moscow	8
3	(Cameroon) Gabrielle Onguéné	WFC Rossiyanka	6
3	(Ukraine) Daryna Apanaschenko	Zvezda 2005 Perm	6
5	(Russia) Olesja Kurotschkina	Zvezda 2005 Perm	4
5	(Ukraine) Yulia Kornievets	Zvezda 2005 Perm	4
5	(Ivory Coast) Josée Nahi	WFC Rossiyanka	4
5	(Russia) Anna Sinyutina	Ryazan VDV	4
9	8 Players		3
