= Nelli Korovkina =

Russian footballer (born 1989)

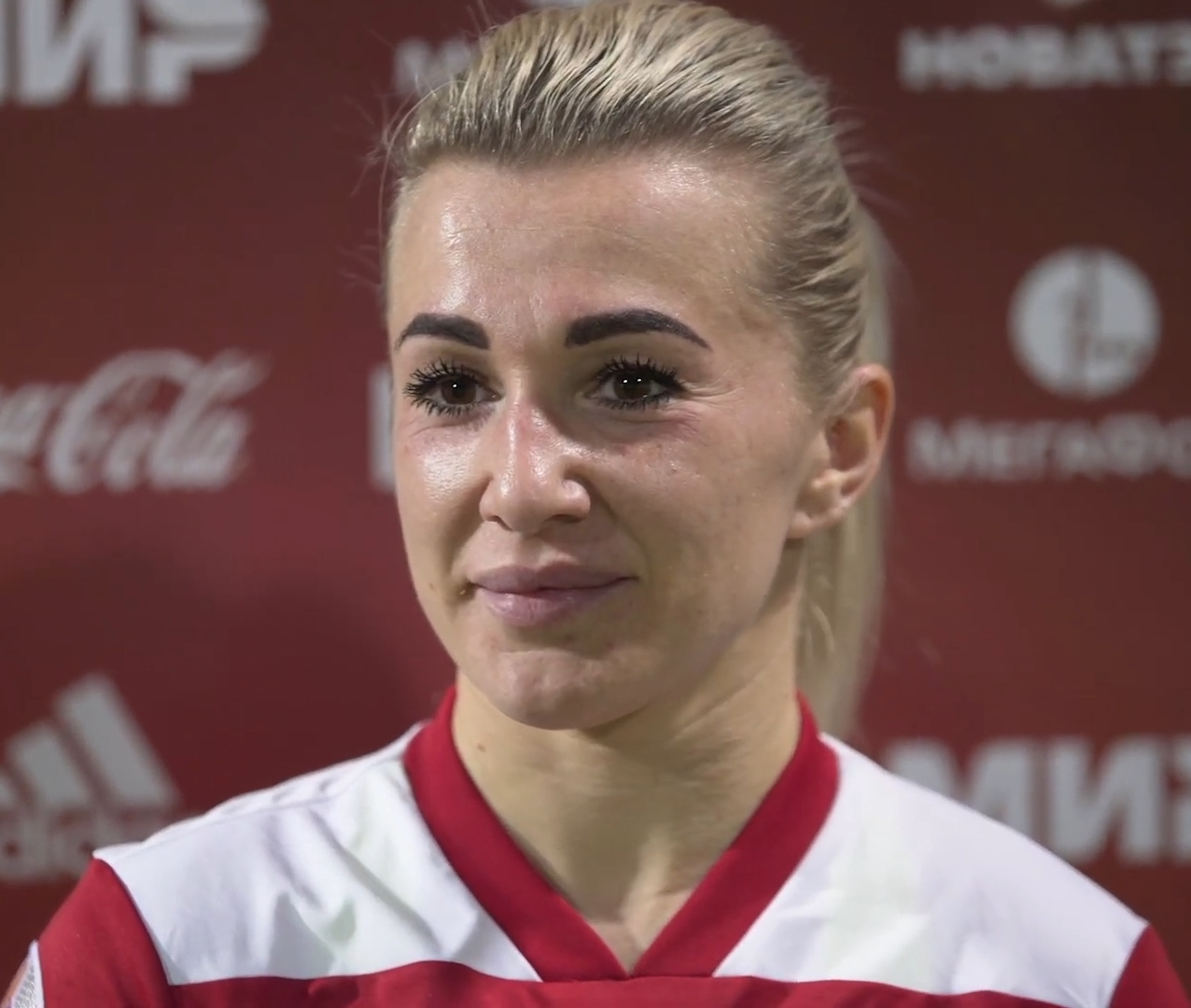
- Korovkina in 2020

Personal information
- Full name: Nelli Korovkina
- Date of birth: 1 November 1989 (age 36)
- Place of birth: Moscow, Russia
- Height: 1.55 m (5 ft 1 in)
- Position: Striker

Team information
- Current team: WFC Zenit
- Number: 20

Senior career*
Years	Team	Apps	(Gls)
2009–2014	Izmailovo Moscow	92	(32)
2014–2015	Zorky Krasnogorsk	28	(9)
2016	Ryazan VDV	15	(3)
2017–2018	Chertanovo Moscow	25	(11)
2019–2023	Lokomotiv Moscow	52	(46)
2024–	WFC Zenit	0	(0)

International career^{‡}
2007	Russia U18	3	(3)
2008	Russia U19	5	(4)
2012–	Russia	70	(25)
- * Club domestic league appearances and goals as of 2:15, 25 November 2019 (UTC) ‡ National team caps and goals as of 14:00, 03 February 2022 (UTC)

Nelli Vitalyevna Korovkina (Russian: Нелли Витальевна Коровкина; born 1 November 1989) is a Russian footballer. She plays as a striker for WFC Zenit and the Russia national team.

== Club career ==
She played for Izmailovo Moscow from 2009 to 2014. She then played two seasons for Zorky Krasnogorsk and one for Ryazan VDV before signing in 2017 for Chertanovo Moscow and now plays for Lokomotiv Moscow.

== International career ==
In her first match for the national team against Macedonia, she came to the pitch as a substitute and scored two goals. She was called up to be part of the national team for the UEFA Women's Euro 2013.

Goals scored for the Russian WNT in official competitions
Competition	Stage	Date	Location	Opponent	Goals	Result	Overall
2013 UEFA Euro	Qualifiers	2012–09–15	Prilep	North Macedonia	2	6–0	4
2013 UEFA Euro	Qualifiers	2012–09–19	Khimki	Poland	1	1–1	4
2013 UEFA Euro	First Stage	2013–07–15	Linköping	England	1	1–1	4
2015 FIFA World Cup	Qualifiers	2014–04–05	Khimki	Slovenia	1	4–1	1
2022 UEFA Euro	Qualifiers	2019–09–03	Moscow	Estonia	2	4–0	7
2022 UEFA Euro	Qualifiers	2020–03–06	Wiesbaden	Kosovo	1	5-0	7
2022 UEFA Euro	Qualifiers	2020–09–22	Yurmala	Estonia	1	3-0	7
2022 UEFA Euro	Qualifiers	2020–10–23	Moscow	Slovenia	1	1-0	7
2022 UEFA Euro	Qualifiers	2020–10–27	Moscow	Turkey	1	4-2	7
2022 UEFA Euro	Playoffs	2021–04–09	Lisbon	Portugal	1	1–0	7
2023 FIFA World Cup	Qualifiers	2021–09–17	Moscow	Azerbaijan	1	2–0	5
2023 FIFA World Cup	Qualifiers	2021–09–21	Moscow	Montenegro	1	5-0	5
2023 FIFA World Cup	Qualifiers	2020–09–22	Khimki	Malta	1	3-0	5
2023 FIFA World Cup	Qualifiers	2020–10–23	Zenica	Bosnia and Herzegovina	1	4-0	5
2023 FIFA World Cup	Qualifiers	2020–10–27	Viborg	Denmark	1	1-3	5

== International goals ==
No.	Date	Venue	Opponent	Score	Result	Competition
1.	15 September 2012	Stadion Goce Delčev, Prilep, North Macedonia	North Macedonia	5–0	6–0	UEFA Women's Euro 2013 qualifying
2.	15 September 2012	Stadion Goce Delčev, Prilep, North Macedonia	North Macedonia	6–0	6–0	UEFA Women's Euro 2013 qualifying
3.	19 September 2012	Rodina Stadium, Khimki, Russia	Poland	1–1	1–1	UEFA Women's Euro 2013 qualifying
4.	5 July 2013	Melløs Stadion, Moss, Norway	Norway	1–1	3–2	Friendly
5.	15 July 2013	Arena Linköping, Linköping, Sweden	England	1–0	1–1	UEFA Women's Euro 2013
6.	7 March 2014	Stadium Bela Vista, Parchal, Portugal	Portugal	2–1	3–1	2014 Algarve Cup
7.	5 April 2014	Rodina Stadium, Khimki, Russia	Slovenia	2–1	4–1	2015 FIFA Women's World Cup qualification
8.	7 April 2019	Hankou Cultural Sports Centre, Wuhan, China	Croatia	2–0	3–0	2019 Wuhan International Tournament
9.	7 April 2019	Hankou Cultural Sports Centre, Wuhan, China	Croatia	3–0	3–0	2019 Wuhan International Tournament
10.	3 September 2019	Sapsan Arena, Moscow, Russia	Estonia	1–0	4–0	UEFA Women's Euro 2022 qualifying
11.	3 September 2019	Sapsan Arena, Moscow, Russia	Estonia	3–0	4–0	UEFA Women's Euro 2022 qualifying
12.	6 March 2020	Brita-Arena, Wiesbaden, Germany	Kosovo	2–0	5–0	UEFA Women's Euro 2022 qualifying
13.	22 September 2020	Slokas Stadium, Jūrmala, Latvia	Estonia	3–0	3–0	UEFA Women's Euro 2022 qualifying
14.	23 October 2020	Sapsan Arena, Moscow, Russia	Slovenia	1–0	1–0	UEFA Women's Euro 2022 qualifying
15.	27 October 2020	Sapsan Arena, Moscow, Russia	Turkey	1–0	4–2	UEFA Women's Euro 2022 qualifying
16.	23 February 2021	Gold City Sports Complex, Kargıcak, Turkey	India	5–0	8–0	2021 Turkish Women's Cup
17.	23 February 2021	Gold City Sports Complex, Kargıcak, Turkey	India	6–0	8–0	2021 Turkish Women's Cup
18.	23 February 2021	Gold City Sports Complex, Kargıcak, Turkey	India	7–0	8–0	2021 Turkish Women's Cup
19.	9 April 2021	Estádio do Restelo, Lisbon, Portugal	Portugal	1–0	1–0	UEFA Women's Euro 2022 qualifying play-offs
20.	17 September 2021	Sportivnyy Gorodok, Moscow, Russia	Azerbaijan	2–0	2–0	2023 FIFA Women's World Cup qualification
21.	21 September 2021	Sportivnyy Gorodok, Moscow, Russia	Montenegro	1–0	5–0	2023 FIFA Women's World Cup qualification
22.	21 October 2021	Arena Khimki, Khimki, Russia	Malta	1–0	3–0	2023 FIFA Women's World Cup qualification
23.	26 October 2021	FF BH Football Training Centre, Zenica, Bosnia & Herzegovina	Bosnia and Herzegovina	1–0	4–0	2023 FIFA Women's World Cup qualification
24.	30 November 2021	Viborg Stadium, Viborg, Denmark	Denmark	1–3	1–3	2023 FIFA Women's World Cup qualification
25.	16 February 2022	La Manga Club Football Stadium, La Manga, Spain	Hungary	1–0	2–2 (3–0 p)	2022 Pinatar Cup

== Personal life ==
Korovkina was born in Moscow.

== Honours ==
Izmailovo Moscow

Runner-up

- Russian Women's Cup: 2013

Lokomotiv Moscow

Winner

- Russian Women's Football Championship (2) : 2020, 2021
- Russian Women's Cup (2): 2020, 2021
- Russian Women's Supercup (1) : 2021
