= Ekaterina Tyryshkina =

Russian football player (born 1996)

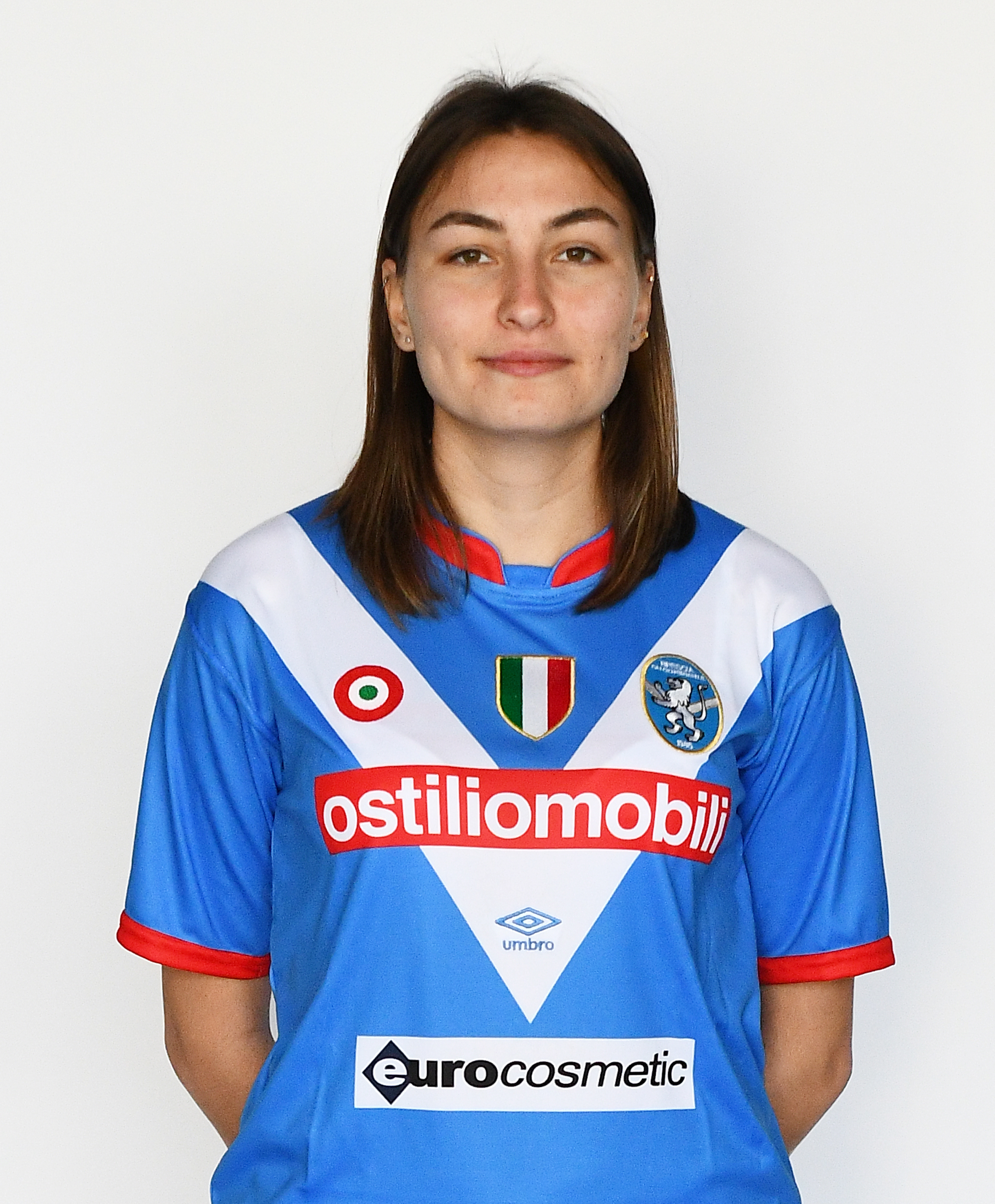
- Tyryshkina with Brescia in 2017

Personal information
- Full name: Ekaterina Nikolayevna Tyryshkina
- Date of birth: 31 January 1996 (age 30)
- Place of birth: Angarsk, Russia
- Height: 1.75 m (5 ft 9 in)
- Position: Midfielder

Team information
- Current team: Montauban
- Number: 15

Youth career
- Kubanochka

Senior career*
| Years | Team | Apps | (Gls) |
| 2013–2015 | Kubanochka | 39 | (4) |
| 2016 | NiceFutis | 12 | (1) |
| 2017 | Brescia | 9 | (2) |
| 2017–2018 | Rodez | 18 | (1) |
| 2018–2020 | Guingamp | 28 | (0) |
| 2020–2021 | Le Havre | 15 | (0) |
| 2021–2023 | Dijon | 34 | (0) |
| 2024– | Montauban | 17 | (0) |

International career
| 2012 | Russia U17 | 7 | (0) |
| 2013–2015 | Russia U19 | 23 | (0) |
| 2015–2022 | Russia | 8 | (0) |
- * Club domestic league appearances and goals as of 10 November 2024

Ekaterina Nikolayevna Tyryshkina (born 31 January 1996) is a Russian professional footballer who plays as a midfielder for French Division 3 Féminine club Montauban.

== Club career ==
Tyryshkina started her professional career with Kubanochka Krasnodar. On 29 September 2013, she made her professional debut in a 1–2 league defeat against Ryazan. She netted her first goal on 24 April 2015 in a 1–1 draw against Rossiyanka.

Tyryshkina left the club after 2015 season and had short term spells with NiceFutis, Brescia and Rodez in Finland, Italy and France respectively. On 2 September 2018, French top division club Guingamp announced her signing on a two-year deal.

On 6 July 2021, Dijon announced the signing of Tyryshkina for 2021–22 season.

== International career ==
Tyryshkina is a former Russian youth international. She made her senior team debut on 22 October 2015, coming on as a 73rd minute substitute for Daria Makarenko in a 2–0 defeat against Germany during 2017 Euro qualifiers.
