= Ekaterina Bratko =

Russian footballer (born 1993)

Personal information
- Full name: Ekaterina Vasilyevna Bratko
- Date of birth: 17 November 1993 (age 32)
- Place of birth: Russia,
- Position: Midfielder

Team information
- Current team: CSKA Moscow

Senior career*
Years	Team	Apps	(Gls)
2011-2016	Kubanochka	60	(0)
2017	Donchanka Azov	13	(0)
2018-2019	Lokomotiv Moscow	23	(1)
2020	Yenisey Krasnoyarsk	14	(0)
2021-	CSKA Moscow	17	(0)

International career^{‡}
- Russia
- * Club domestic league appearances and goals as of 15:40, 15 September 2019 (UTC) ‡ National team caps and goals as of 15:40, 15 September 2019 (UTC)

Ekaterina Vasilyevna Bratko (Russian: Екатерина Васильевна Братко; born 17 November 1993) is a Russian footballer who plays as a midfielder and has appeared for the Russia women's national team.

== Career ==
Bratko has been capped for the Russia national team, appearing for the team during the 2019 FIFA Women's World Cup qualifying cycle.
