= Aleksandr Solodkov =

Russian footballer

Personal information
- Full name: Aleksandr Andreyevich Solodkov
- Date of birth: 7 May 1998 (age 28)
- Place of birth: Cherepovets, Vologda Oblast, Russia
- Height: 1.80 m (5 ft 11 in)
- Position: Midfielder

Senior career*
Years	Team	Apps	(Gls)
2014–2015	FC Cherepovets		
2017–2020	FC Tekstilshchik Ivanovo	56	(2)
- * Club domestic league appearances and goals

Aleksandr Andreyevich Solodkov (Russian: Александр Андреевич Солодков; born 2 July 1998) is a Russian former football player.

== Club career ==
He made his debut in the Russian Professional Football League for FC Tekstilshchik Ivanovo on 19 July 2017 in a game against FC Chertanovo Moscow. He made his Russian Football National League debut for Tekstilshchik on 8 September 2019 in a game against FC Baltika Kaliningrad.
