= UEFA Women's Euro 2017 qualifying Group 5 =

Football tournament qualification stage

Group 5 of the UEFA Women's Euro 2017 qualifying competition consisted of five teams: Germany, Russia, Hungary, Turkey, and Croatia. The composition of the eight groups in the qualifying group stage was decided by the draw held on 20 April 2015.

The group was played in home-and-away round-robin format. The group winners qualified directly for the final tournament, while the runners-up also qualified directly if they were one of the six best runners-up among all eight groups (not counting results against the fifth-placed team); otherwise, the runners-up advance to the play-offs.

== Standings ==
Pos	Team	Pld	W	D	L	GF	GA	GD	Pts	Qualification	Germany	Russia	Hungary	Croatia	Turkey
1	Germany	8	8	0	0	35	0	+35	24	Final tournament	—	2–0	12–0	2–0	7–0
2	Russia	8	4	2	2	14	9	+5	14	Final tournament	0–4	—	3–3	5–0	2–0
3	Hungary	8	2	2	4	8	20	−12	8		0–1	0–1	—	2–0	1–0
4	Croatia	8	2	1	5	8	15	−7	7		0–1	0–3	1–1	—	3–0
5	Turkey	8	1	1	6	3	24	−21	4		0–6	0–0	2–1	1–4	—

Source: UEFA
Rules for classification: Qualification tiebreakers

== Matches ==
Times are CEST (UTC+2) for dates between 29 March and 24 October 2015 and between 27 March and 29 October 2016, for other dates times are CET (UTC+1).

17 September 2015
16:30

Turkey	1–4	Croatia
Uraz 17'	Report	Landeka 29'; Joščak 71'; Šundov 80'; Šalek 90+2'

Kazım Karabekir Stadium, Erzurum
Attendance: 5,132
Referee: Esther Azzopardi (Malta)

18 September 2015
16:00

Germany	12–0	Hungary
Popp 7', 66'; Maier 9'; Kemme 16'; Behringer 19' (pen.); Bremer 28', 70', 84'; Goeßling 33', 39'; Laudehr 63'; Leupolz 72'	Report

Erdgas Sportpark, Halle
Attendance: 4,378
Referee: Sara Persson (Sweden)

22 September 2015
18:00

Croatia	0–1	Germany
	Report	Popp 4'

Stadion Kranjčevićeva, Zagreb
Attendance: 230
Referee: Sabine Bonnin (France)

21 October 2015
16:00

Hungary	1–0	Turkey
Szuh 46'	Report

Groupama Arena, Budapest
Attendance: 2,150
Referee: Tess Petersson (Sweden)

22 October 2015
16:00

Germany	2–0	Russia
Islacker 8'; Maier 48'	Report

BRITA-Arena, Wiesbaden
Attendance: 4,516
Referee: Efthalia Mitsi (Greece)

25 October 2015
14:15

Germany	7–0	Turkey
Islacker 6'; Mittag 29'; Behringer 37' (pen.); Däbritz 69', 90+3'; Magull 78', 86'	Report

Hardtwaldstadion, Sandhausen
Attendance: 6,734
Referee: Rhona Daly (Republic of Ireland)
25 October 2015
16:00

Croatia	1–1	Hungary
Joščak 68'	Report	Jakabfi 45' (pen.)

Stadion Gradski vrt, Osijek
Attendance: 800
Referee: Eleni Lampadariou (Greece)

25 November 2015
15:00

Turkey	0–0	Russia
	Report

Fethiye İlçe Stadyumu, Fethiye
Attendance: 1,485
Referee: Ana Aguiar (Portugal)

29 November 2015
16:30

Hungary	0–1	Russia
	Report	Makarenko 55'

Pancho Arena, Felcsút
Attendance: 750
Referee: Sarah Garratt (England)

30 November 2015
16:00

Croatia	3–0	Turkey
Šundov 29'; Joščak 39'; Andrlić 88'	Report

Stadion Rujevica, Rijeka
Attendance: 400
Referee: Ivana Projkovska (Macedonia)

8 April 2016
16:00

Turkey	0–6	Germany
	Report	Kerschowski 29', 60', 90+3'; Mittag 40'; Popp 78', 86'

Recep Tayyip Erdoğan Stadium, Istanbul
Attendance: 308
Referee: Florence Guillemin (France)
8 April 2016
20:30

Hungary	2–0	Croatia
Jakabfi 43', 86'	Report

Ménfői út, Győr
Attendance: 200
Referee: Zuzana Kováčová (Slovakia)

12 April 2016
17:58

Germany	2–0	Croatia
Marozsán 32'; Mittag 50'	Report

Stadion an der Bremer Brücke, Osnabrück
Attendance: 8,276
Referee: Marte Sørø (Norway)
12 April 2016
18:00

Russia	3–3	Hungary
Terekhova 13', 85' (pen.); Dmitrenko 90+2'	Report	Vágó 19'; Zeller 66'; Jakabfi 76'

Minor Sport Arena Petrovsky, Saint Petersburg
Attendance: 2,543
Referee: Sofia Karagiorgi (Cyprus)

2 June 2016
18:00

Russia	2–0	Turkey
Pantyukhina 47'; Karpova 64'	Report

Arena Khimki, Khimki
Attendance: 2,000
Referee: Vivian Peeters (Netherlands)

6 June 2016
18:00

Turkey	2–1	Hungary
Türkoğlu 4'; Mosdóczi 27' (o.g.)	Report	Jakabfi 40'

Akdeniz University Stadium, Antalya
Attendance: 142
Referee: Julia-Stefanie Baier (Austria)
6 June 2016
19:30

Croatia	0–3	Russia
	Report	Žigić 10' (o.g.); Karpova 21'; Kozhnikova 38'

Gradski stadion, Koprivnica
Attendance: 1,100
Referee: Morag Pirie (Scotland)

16 September 2016
17:58

Russia	0–4	Germany
	Report	Tsybutovich 7' (o.g.); Maier 14'; Hendrich 26'; Petermann 78'

Arena Khimki, Khimki
Attendance: 500
Referee: Cristina Dorcioman (Romania)

20 September 2016
16:00

Hungary	0–1	Germany
	Report	Szabó 29' (o.g.)

Ménfői út, Győr
Attendance: 1,000
Referee: Lina Lehtovaara (Finland)
20 September 2016
19:00

Russia	5–0	Croatia
Pantyukhina 6'; Chernomyrdina 12'; Danilova 25', 44'; Sochneva 75'	Report

Arena Khimki, Khimki
Attendance: 598
Referee: Carina Vitulano (Italy)

== Goalscorers ==
5 goals

- (Germany) Alexandra Popp
- (Hungary) Zsanett Jakabfi

3 goals

- (Croatia) Maja Joščak
- (Germany) Pauline Bremer
- (Germany) Isabel Kerschowski
- (Germany) Leonie Maier
- (Germany) Anja Mittag

2 goals

- (Croatia) Kristina Šundov
- (Germany) Melanie Behringer
- (Germany) Sara Däbritz
- (Germany) Lena Goeßling
- (Germany) Mandy Islacker
- (Germany) Lina Magull
- (Russia) Elena Danilova
- (Russia) Nadezhda Karpova
- (Russia) Ekaterina Pantyukhina
- (Russia) Elena Terekhova

1 goal

- (Croatia) Mateja Andrlić
- (Croatia) Iva Landeka
- (Croatia) Martina Šalek
- (Germany) Kathrin Hendrich
- (Germany) Tabea Kemme
- (Germany) Simone Laudehr
- (Germany) Melanie Leupolz
- (Germany) Dzsenifer Marozsán
- (Germany) Lena Petermann
- (Hungary) Erika Szuh
- (Hungary) Fanny Vágó
- (Hungary) Dóra Zeller
- (Russia) Margarita Chernomyrdina
- (Russia) Ekaterina Dmitrenko
- (Russia) Anna Kozhnikova
- (Russia) Daria Makarenko
- (Russia) Ekaterina Sochneva
- (Turkey) Ece Türkoğlu
- (Turkey) Yağmur Uraz

1 own goal

- (Croatia) Sandra Žigić (playing against Russia)
- (Hungary) Evelin Mosdóczi (playing against Turkey)
- (Hungary) Viktória Szabó (playing against Germany)
- (Russia) Ksenia Tsybutovich (playing against Germany)
