= Marina Kiskonen =

Russian footballer (born 1994)

Personal information
- Full name: Marina Kiskonen
- Date of birth: 19 March 1994 (age 32)
- Place of birth: Veliky Novgorod, Russia
- Positions: Midfielder; forward

Team information
- Current team: ALG Spor, Gaziantep

Senior career*
Years	Team	Apps	(Gls)
- Chertanovo Moscow
2011–2014	Rossiyanka	33	(1)
2015–2018	Chertanovo Moscow	57	(16)
2019	KuPS	21	(5)
2020-2021	Alavés		
2021	Alhama ElPozo		
2021-2022	CSKA Moscow	22	(0)
2023	FC Minsk	20	(17)
2024	FC Krylya Sovetov	22	(2)
2025	ALG Spor, Gaziantep	10	(1)

International career
- Russia U-19
2017–	Russia	11	(0)
Medal record
Women's football
Representing Russia
Summer Universiade
Bronze medal – third place	2017 Taipei	Women's
- * Club domestic league appearances and goals as of 9 December 2023

Marina Aleksandrovna Kiskonen (Russian: Марина Александровна Кисконен; born 19 March 1994) is a Russian football forward. She is playing for Turkish Women's Football Super League team ALG Spor, Gaziantep.

During 2015–2018 Kiskonen played in the Russian Championship for Chertanovo Moscow, with which she also played in the UEFA Champions League. She scored 2nd most goals (8) in 2018 Russian Championship, and also found success in 2017 season with 5 goals.

Kiskonen also played for Kuopion Palloseura in Finland's Naisten Liiga, before signing for Spanish second division team Deportivo Alavés.
