= Elena Danilova =

Russian footballer (born 1987)

Elena Danilova Елена Данилова
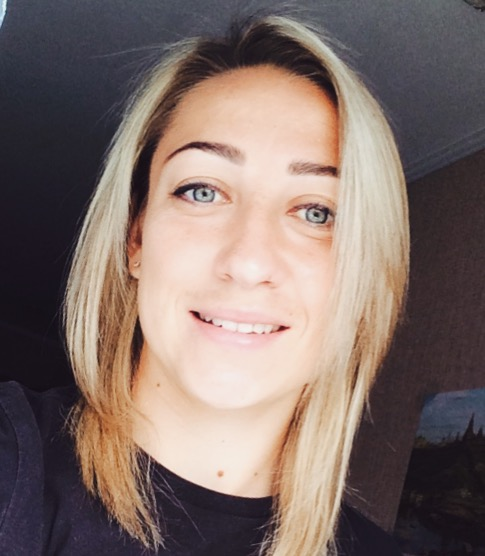

Personal information
- Full name: Elena Yurievna Danilova
- Date of birth: 17 June 1987 (age 39)
- Place of birth: Voronezh, Russia SFSR, Soviet Union
- Height: 1.70 m (5 ft 7 in)
- Position: Striker

Senior career*
Years	Team	Apps	(Gls)
2001–2004	Energiya Voronezh		
2005	Ryazan VDV		
2006	Spartak Moscow		(23)
2007–2008	FC Indiana		
2009	Rossiyanka	8	(4)
2010–2012	Energiya Voronezh	43	(27)
2012–2018	Ryazan VDV	91	(67)

International career
2003–2006	Russia U19	18	(30)
2003–2018	Russia	52	(21)
- * Club domestic league appearances and goals

Elena Yurievna Danilova is a former international Russian football forward who played for Ryazan VDV.

At 16 she took part in the 2003 World Cup. She scored Russia's last goal in the tournament, in the quarterfinals against eventual champions Germany. Two years later she led with 9 goals the Under-19 NT in Russia's first international women's football triumph, the 2005 U-19 Euro. Danilova was named the competition's MVP. The following year she was included in the 2006 U-20 World Cup All-Star Team. She was also the top scorer of the 2006 U-19 Euro.

Danilova missed the 2008 season and the 2009 Euro qualifying because of a knee injury she suffered during a move to WPSL's FC Indiana, but she recovered in time for the tournament and took part in Russia's three games. She scored five goals in the 2011 World Cup qualifying, four of them against Kazakhstan.

== Honours ==
Club

Energiya Voronezh

- Russian Women's Championship: Winner 2002, 2003

F.C. Indiana

- Women's Premier Soccer League: Winner 2007

Rossiyanka

- Russian Women's Cup: Winner 2009

Ryazan VDV

- Russian Women's Championship: Winner 2013, 2017
- Russian Women's Cup: Winner 2014

Rusia National team (U19)

- UEFA Women's Under-19 Championship: Winner 2005

Individual

- UEFA Women's Under-19 Championship: Best Player 2005
- UEFA Women's Under-19 Championship: Topscorer 2005 (9 goals)
- Russian League top scorer: 2013, 2017, 2018

== International goals ==
No.	Date	Venue	Opponent	Score	Result	Competition
1.	2 October 2003	PGE Park, Portland, United States	Germany	1–4	1–7	2003 FIFA Women's World Cup
2.	28 August 2005	Moskvich Stadium, Moscow, Russia	Scotland	4–0	6–0	2007 FIFA Women's World Cup qualification
3.	23 September 2009	Esp Stadium, Fislisbach, Switzerland	Switzerland	2–0	2–1	2011 FIFA Women's World Cup qualification
4.	25 August 2010	Krasnoarmeysk Stadium, Krasnoarmeysk, Russia	Kazakhstan	3–0	8–0	2011 FIFA Women's World Cup qualification
5.	25 August 2010	Krasnoarmeysk Stadium, Krasnoarmeysk, Russia	Kazakhstan	4–0	8–0	2011 FIFA Women's World Cup qualification
6.	25 August 2010	Krasnoarmeysk Stadium, Krasnoarmeysk, Russia	Kazakhstan	5–0	8–0	2011 FIFA Women's World Cup qualification
7.	25 August 2010	Krasnoarmeysk Stadium, Krasnoarmeysk, Russia	Kazakhstan	7–0	8–0	2011 FIFA Women's World Cup qualification
8.	20 September 2016	Arena Khimki, Khimki, Russia	Croatia	3–0	5–0	UEFA Women's Euro 2017 qualifying
9.	20 September 2016	Arena Khimki, Khimki, Russia	Croatia	4–0	5–0	UEFA Women's Euro 2017 qualifying
10.	8 June 2017	Saturn Stadium, Ramenskoye, Russia	Serbia	1–2	5–2	Friendly
11.	8 June 2017	Saturn Stadium, Ramenskoye, Russia	Serbia	2–2	5–2	Friendly
12.	8 June 2017	Saturn Stadium, Ramenskoye, Russia	Serbia	5–2	5–2	Friendly
13.	11 June 2017	Saturn Stadium, Ramenskoye, Russia	Serbia	1–0	2–0	Friendly
14.	17 July 2017	Sparta Stadion Het Kasteel, Rotterdam, Netherlands	Italy	1–0	2–1	UEFA Women's Euro 2017
15.	5 April 2018	Bosnia and Herzegovina FA Training Centre, Zenica, Bosnia & Herzegovina	Bosnia and Herzegovina	1–1	6–1	2019 FIFA Women's World Cup qualification
16.	5 April 2018	Bosnia and Herzegovina FA Training Centre, Zenica, Bosnia & Herzegovina	Bosnia and Herzegovina	5–1	6–1	2019 FIFA Women's World Cup qualification
17.	9 April 2018	Astana Arena, Nur-Sultan, Kazakhstan	Kazakhstan	1–0	3–0	2019 FIFA Women's World Cup qualification
18.	8 June 2018	Sapsan Arena, Moscow, Russia	England	1–2	1–3	2019 FIFA Women's World Cup qualification
19.	4 September 2018	Sapsan Arena, Moscow, Russia	Bosnia and Herzegovina	1–0	3–0	2019 FIFA Women's World Cup qualification
20.	4 September 2018	Sapsan Arena, Moscow, Russia	Bosnia and Herzegovina	2–0	3–0	2019 FIFA Women's World Cup qualification
