= Elvira Todua =

Russian football player (born 1986)

Elvira Todua Эльви́ра То́дуа
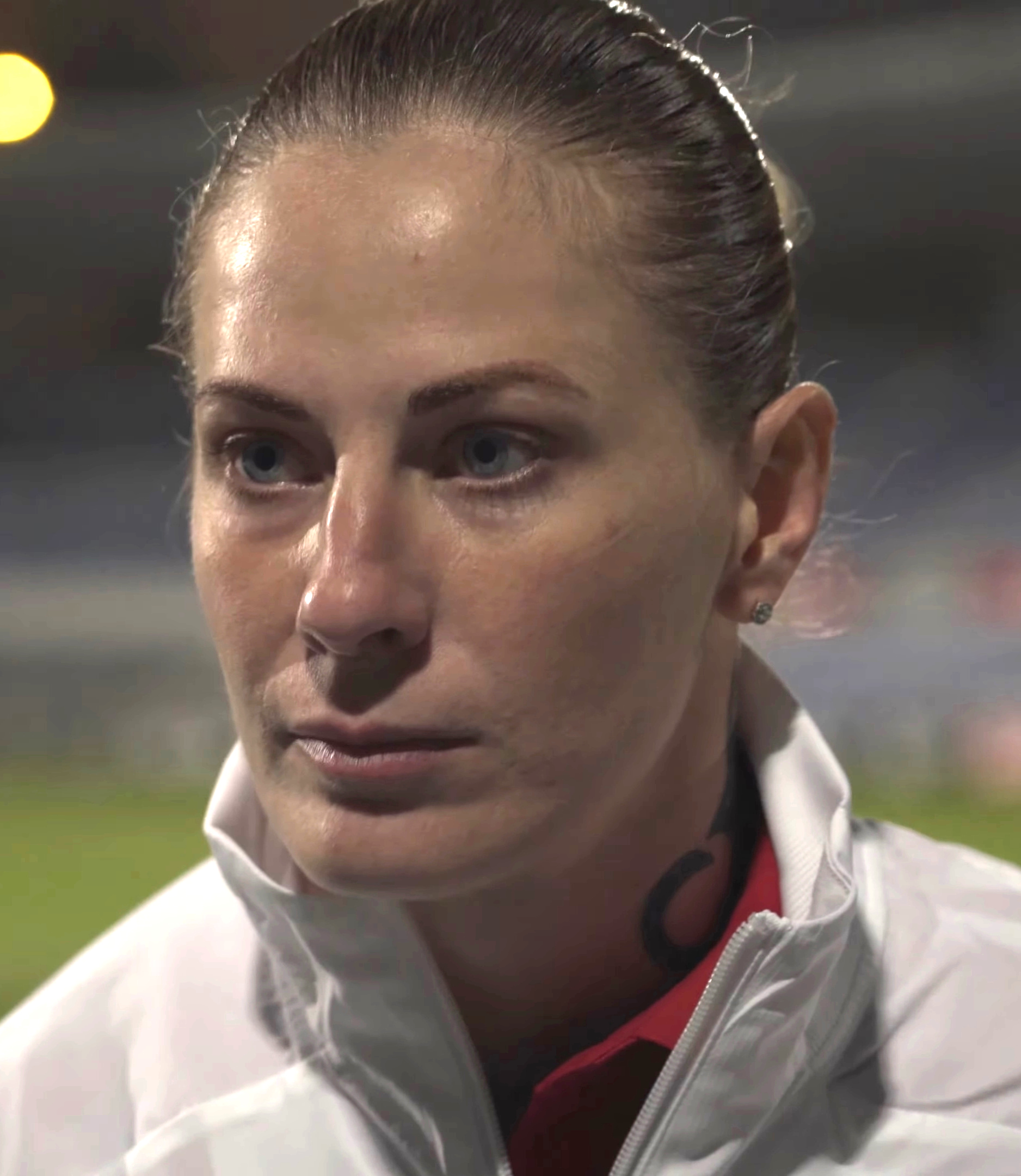
- Elvira Todua in 2021

Personal information
- Full name: Elvira Zurabovna Todua
- Date of birth: 31 January 1986 (age 40)
- Place of birth: Tkvarcheli, Abkhaz ASSR, Soviet Union
- Height: 1.81 m (5 ft 11 in)
- Position: Goalkeeper

Team information
- Current team: CSKA Moscow
- Number: 1

Senior career*
| Years | Team | Apps | (Gls) |
| 1999–2000 | Don Tex | | (0) |
| 2000 | Kubanochka Krasnodar | | (0) |
| 2001–2003 | VVS Samara | | (0) |
| 2004 | Rossiyanka | | (0) |
| 2005–2007 | Rossiyanka | | (0) |
| 2007–2009 | SKA Rostov | | (0) |
| 2009–2016 | Rossiyanka | 87 | (0) |
| 2016 | Rossiyanka | 1 | (0) |
| 2016 | CSKA Moscow | 11 | (1) |
| 2016 | Rossiyanka | 2 | (0) |
| 2017– | CSKA Moscow | 61 | (2) |

International career^{‡}
| 2001–2005 | Russia U19 | 28 | (0) |
| 2005– | Russia | 100 | (0) |
- * Club domestic league appearances and goals ‡ National team caps and goals as of 13 April 2021 (UTC)

Elvira Zurabovna Todua (Russian: Эльвира Зурабовна Тодуа; born 31 January 1986) is an Abkhazian, Georgian, Russian football goalkeeper who plays for CSKA Moscow of the Russian Women's Football Championship.

Todua became the Russia women's national football team's first-choice goalkeeper after making her debut in 2003. She competed at the UEFA Women's Championships in 2009 and 2013.

== Club career ==
With Rossiyanka she has won two Top Division titles and two Russian Women's Cup winners' medals. She has also represented the club in the UEFA Women's Champions League. She is a first-choice penalty-taker in her club, and scored 4 goals in the seasons 2016–2018.

== International career ==
=== Russia ===
Todua made her debut for the senior Russia women's national football team in a 2003 friendly against China. She was named in the tournament All-Star Team at the 2004 FIFA U-19 Women's World Championship.

She was part of the victorious Russian team at the 2005 UEFA Women's Under-19 Championship in Hungary. When the final against France went to a penalty shootout, Todua scored Russia's sixth penalty herself then saved Laure Boulleau's attempt to secure the win.

In qualifying for UEFA Women's Euro 2009, Todua played in Russia's play–off win over Scotland. She was named in national coach Igor Shalimov's squad for the final tournament. After missing the first two matches with a knee injury, Todua was restored to the team for Russia's final match: a 2–0 defeat by Italy. She was left disappointed by Russia's early exit.

Four years later Todua overcame a shoulder injury to take her place in the squad for UEFA Women's Euro 2013 in Sweden. Russia lost 3–1 to France but drew 1–1 with both England and Spain. They were eliminated after losing out to Denmark on the drawing of lots.

Todua took painkilling injections in order to play but underwent surgery on her injured shoulder after the tournament.

On 13 April 2021, she played her 100th match for Russia against Portugal in the UEFA Women's Euro 2022 qualifying play-offs.

=== Abkhazia ===
In June 2012, Todua made a late substitute appearance in the male Abkhazia national football team's first ever match: a 2–1 friendly win over Russian club FC Krasnodar.

== Personal life ==
Todua was born in Tkvarcheli, but moved to Novocherkassk in Russia when she was seven, due to the War in Abkhazia (1992–93).

In 2011 Todua's club Rossiyanka attracted attention for a bikini photoshoot. Pin-up girl Todua has also been featured in various magazine modeling assignments. A national newspaper declared her amongst Russia's 20 most beautiful athletes in 2009.

== Honours ==
=== Club ===
WFC Rossiyanka

- Top Division (2): 2010, 2011–12
- Russian Women's Cup (2): 2009, 2010

=== International ===
Russia

- UEFA Women's Under-19 Championship (1): 2005

=== Individual ===
- FIFA Women's World Under-19 Championship All-Star Team (1): 2004
