= 2019 Wuhan International Tournament =

Tournament details
- Host country: China
- Cities: Wuhan, Hubei
- Dates: 4–7 April 2019
- Teams: 4 (from 3 confederations)
- Venue: 1 (in 1 host city)

Final positions
- Champions: China (1st title)
- Runners-up: Cameroon
- Third place: Russia
- Fourth place: Croatia

Tournament statistics
- Matches played: 4
- Goals scored: 12 (3 per match)
- Top scorer: (China) Wang Shanshan (3 goals)

The 2019 Wuhan International Tournament (Chinese: 2019年武汉国际女足锦标赛) was an invitational women's football tournament held in Wuhan, Hubei, China.

== Teams ==
In March 2019, the participants were announced.

Team	FIFA Rankings (December 2018)
China (host)	15
Russia	25
Cameroon	46
Croatia	51

== Matches ==
All times are local (UTC+08:00).

=== Bracket ===
Semi-finals
4 April - Wuhan
Cameroon	2
Croatia	1
4 April - Wuhan
China	4
Russia	1

Final
7 April - Wuhan
Cameroon	0
China	1
Third-place playoff
7 April - Wuhan
Croatia	0
Russia	3

=== Semi-finals ===
4 April 2019
15:00

Cameroon	2–1	Croatia
Ngono Mani 33'; Akaba 83'	Report	Lojna 64'

Hankou Cultural Sports Centre, Wuhan
Referee: Mi Siyu (China)
4 April 2019
19:35

China	4–1	Russia
Yang Li 14'; Wang Shanshan 65', 77'; Song Duan 75'	Report	Smirnova 8'

Hankou Cultural Sports Centre, Wuhan
Referee: Park Se-jin (South Korea)

=== Third-place playoff ===
7 April 2019
15:00

Croatia	0–3	Russia
	Report	Smirnova 12'; Korovkina 35', 61'

Hankou Cultural Sports Centre, Wuhan
Referee: Chang Xinxin (China)

=== Final ===
7 April 2019
19:35

Cameroon	0–1	China
	Report	Wang Shanshan 40'

Hankou Cultural Sports Centre, Wuhan
Referee: Park Se-jin (South Korea)

== Goalscorers ==
There have been 12 goals scored in 4 matches, for an average of 3 goals per match.

3 goals

- (China) Wang Shanshan

2 goals

- (Russia) Nelli Korovkina
- (Russia) Nadezhda Smirnova

1 goal

- (Cameroon) Henriette Akaba
- (Cameroon) Madeleine Ngono Mani
- (China) Song Duan
- (China) Yang Li
- (Croatia) Izabela Lojna
