= Marija Vuković (footballer) =

Serbian footballer (born 1990)

Personal information
- Date of birth: 25 March 1990 (age 36)
- Place of birth: Serbia, SFR Yugoslavia
- Height: 1.72 m (5 ft 7 1/2 in)
- Position: Forward

Team information
- Current team: Ryazan-VDV
- Number: 20

Senior career*
Years	Team	Apps	(Gls)
2019–	Ryazan-VDV	14	(8)

International career^{‡}
2009–	Serbia	10	(2)
- * Club domestic league appearances and goals as of 25 November 2019 (UTC) ‡ National team caps and goals as of 10 November 2019 (UTC)

Marija Vuković (Serbian Cyrillic: Марија Вуковић; born 25 March 1990) is a Serbian footballer who plays as a forward and has appeared for the Serbia women's national team.

== Career ==
Vuković has been capped for the Serbia national team, appearing for the team during the 2019 FIFA Women's World Cup qualifying cycle.
