= ZFK CSKA Moscow =

WFC CSKA
- Full name: WFC CSKA Moscow
- Founded: 1990 / 2016
- Ground: Novye Khimki Stadium, Khimki
- Capacity: 3 066
- Chairman: Dmitry Sablin
- Manager: Maksim Zinovyev
- League: Russian Championship
- 2025: 2^{nd}
- Website: https://wfccska.ru/
Home colours	Away colours

WFC CSKA Moscow (Russian: ЖФК ЦСКА Москва) is the women's team of Russian football club PFC CSKA Moscow, itself a branch of sports society CSKA Moscow. The club participates in the Russian Women's Football Championship, the top division of Russian women football.

== History ==
The section first competed in 1991, in the short-lived Soviet Championship's second level, as CSKA-Transexpo. Following the dissolution of the Soviet Union that same year, it registered in the Russian Supreme Division, where it competed for two seasons before it folded.

Two decades later, CSKA again registered in the second-tier Russian First League (women's football), but it was again disbanded after just one season. However, following the disbanding of Zorky Krasnogorsk near the end of the 2015 Top Division, FK Rossiyanka filled its vacancy for the next season and the new team was registered as CSKA in the 2016 championship. Its first game, a 1–1 draw against FK Chertanovo, coincided with the 93rd anniversary of the men's CSKA's first football match. CSKA ended the championship second-to-last, while Rossiyanka won its fifth title.

For the 2017 season, several key Rossiyanka players moved to the team, which rose to top-table positions. In July, during the inter-season summer pause, it became a CSKA official section. Two months later the team won its first title after defeating Chertanovo 1–0 in the Russian Cup final.

In recent years CSKA Women won two Russian championships in a row, in 2019 and 2020 and made their debut in UEFA Women's Champions League.

== Season-by-season ==
List of WFC CSKA Moscow seasons

== Titles ==
- Russian championship
  - Winners (2): 2019, 2020
  - Runners-up (5): 2021, 2022, 2023, 2024, 2025
- Russian Women's Cup
  - Winners (3): 2017, 2022, 2023
  - Runners-up (1): 2020
- Russian Women's Super Cup
  - Winners (1): 2024
  - Runners-up (3): 2021, 2022, 2023

== Current squad ==
As of 31 January 2021.

Note: Flags indicate national team as defined under FIFA eligibility rules; some limited exceptions apply. Players may hold more than one non-FIFA nationality.

No.	Pos.	Nation	Player
74	GK	RUS	Elizaveta Shcherbakova
1	GK	RUS	Elvira Todua
27	DF	RUS	Maria Alekseeva
23	DF	RUS	Olga Chernova
15	DF	KAZ	Yulia Myasnikova
22	DF	RUS	Kseniya Kovalenko
63	MF	RUS	Valeria Bespalikova
8	MF	RUS	Karina Baklanova
70	MF	RUS	Margarita Chernomyrdina
5	DF	SRB	Tijana Janković
14	MF	RUS	Tatiana Petrova
10	MF	RUS	Nadezhda Smirnova

No.	Pos.	Nation	Player
17	MF	RUS	Daria Yakovleva
7	FW	CMR	Gabrielle Onguéné
20	FW	RUS	Valeria Bizenkova
29	GK	RUS	Anastasiia Ananjeva
21	FW	RUS	Lyubov Yashchenko
93	MF	RUS	Ekaterina Bratko
65	MF	RUS	Marina Kiskonen
6	DF	SRB	Nevena Damjanović
18	FW	NGA	Francisca Ordega
—	FW	CMR	Tatiana Ewodo Ekogo

== See also ==
- WFC Rossiyanka
