= Olga Chernova =

Russian footballer (born 1997)

Personal information
- Full name: Olga Mikhailovna Chernova
- Date of birth: 15 July 1997 (age 29)
- Position: Midfielder

Team information
- Current team: CSKA Moscow

Senior career*
Years	Team	Apps	(Gls)
2014-2015	WFC Rossiyanka	6	(0)
2016-	CSKA Moscow	67	(7)

International career^{‡}
- Russia
- * Club domestic league appearances and goals as of 02:05, 02 September 2019 (UTC) ‡ National team caps and goals as of 19:24, 30 August 2019 (UTC)

Olga Mikhailovna Chernova (Russian: Ольга Михайловна Чернова; born 15 July 1997) is a Russian footballer who plays as a midfielder for CSKA Moscow and has appeared for the Russia women's national team.

== Career ==
Chernova has been capped for the Russia national team, appearing for the team during the 2019 FIFA Women's World Cup qualifying cycle.
