= Gabrielle Onguéné =

Cameroonian footballer

Gabrielle Aboudi Onguéné
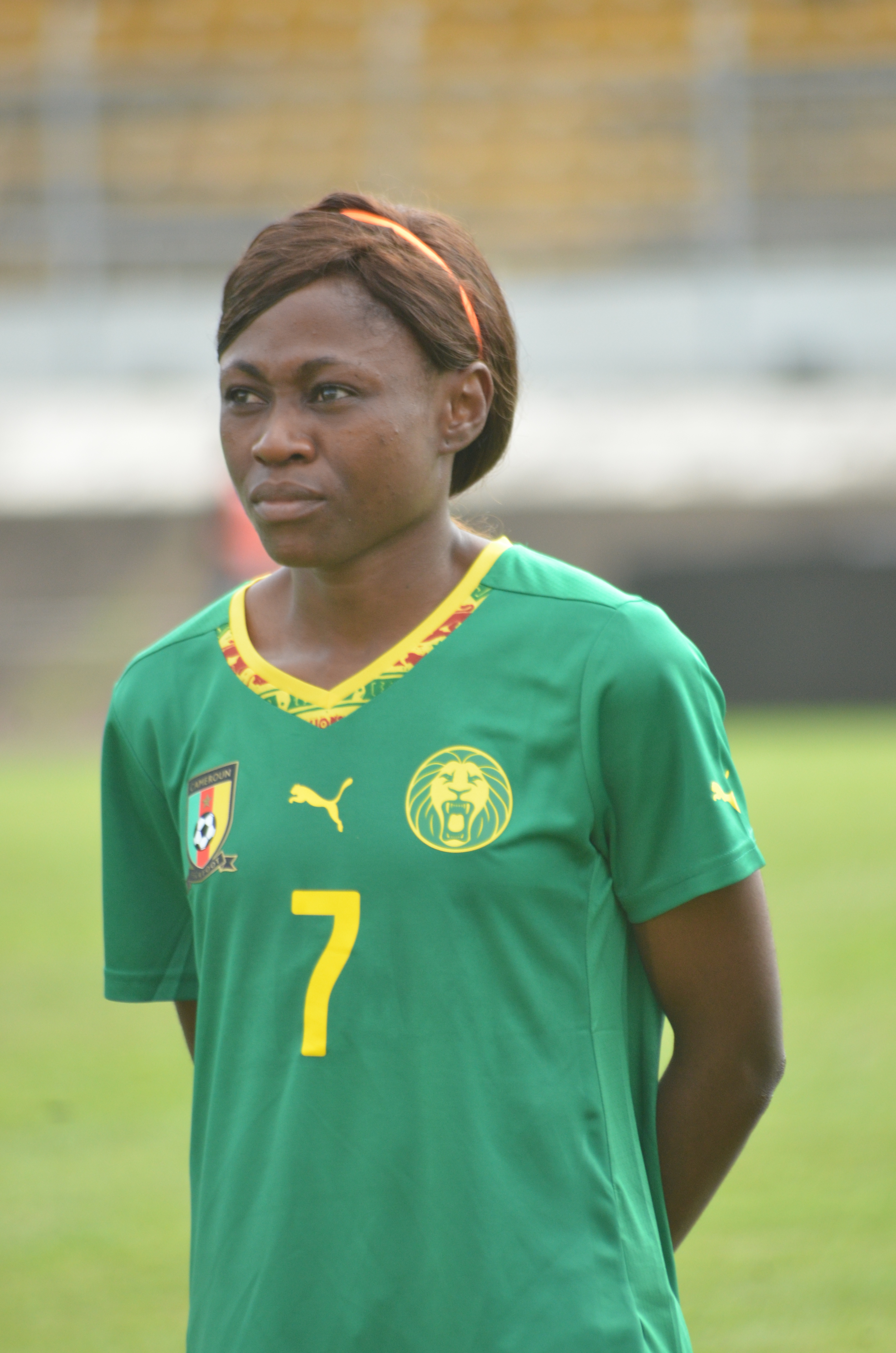

Personal information
- Full name: Gabriele Aboudi Onguéné
- Date of birth: February 25, 1989 (age 37)
- Place of birth: Douala, Cameroon
- Height: 1.53 m (5 ft 0 in)
- Position: Striker

Team information
- Current team: CSKA Moscow
- Number: 7

Senior career*
Years	Team	Apps	(Gls)
- Canon Yaoundé
2009–2012	Louves Minproff		
2012–2015	Alpha Kaliningrad		
2015–2016	Rossiyanka	23	(12)
2017–	CSKA Moscow	112	(45)

International career^{‡}
2008–	Cameroon	53	(19)
Medal record
Women's Africa Cup of Nations
Gold medal – first place	2026 Morocco
- * Club domestic league appearances and goals as of 23 April 2023 ‡ National team caps and goals as of 15 July 2023 (UTC)

Gabrielle Aboudi Onguéné (born 25 February 1989) is a Cameroonian footballer who plays for CSKA Moscow in the Russian Championship and the Cameroon national team. She previously played for Rossiyanka.

== Early life ==
Born in Douala, Aboudi Onguéné began playing football with boys in her neighborhood as a child. She was spotted and recruited to play for girls' club, Ngondi Nkam Yabassi. While playing in a tournament for the club, she was spotted by Canon Yaoundé and began playing for the team in 2005.

== Club career ==
=== Louves Minproff de Yaoundé ===
Aboudi Onguéné played for Louves Minproff in the top-division Cameroonian league and helped the team win the national championship in 2009, 2010, and 2011.

=== Rossiyanka ===
Aboudi Onguéné signed with Rossiyanka in Russia's top division league for the 2015 season. Her six goals in ten appearances ranked third in the league and helped the team finish in second place. During the 2016 season, she scored 6 goals in 13 games helping the team finish first in the league with a 11–2–2 record.

=== CSKA Moskva ===
Aboudi Onguéné signed with CSKA Moscow ahead of the 2017 season. Her 9 goals in 14 appearances tied for second highest in the league. The team finished in fourth place with a 9–4–1 record. During the 2018 season, she scored 3 goals in 13 appearances. Aboudi Onguéné scored her first goal of the 2019 season against Zvezda Perm on May 9 helping the team win 3–1.

== International career ==
Aboudi Onguéné has represented Cameroon on the Cameroonian national team since 2008 after being scouted at the age of 15. In 2011, she helped the team win gold at the All-Africa Games in Mozambique. During the semi-final against South Africa, she scored the game-winning goal.

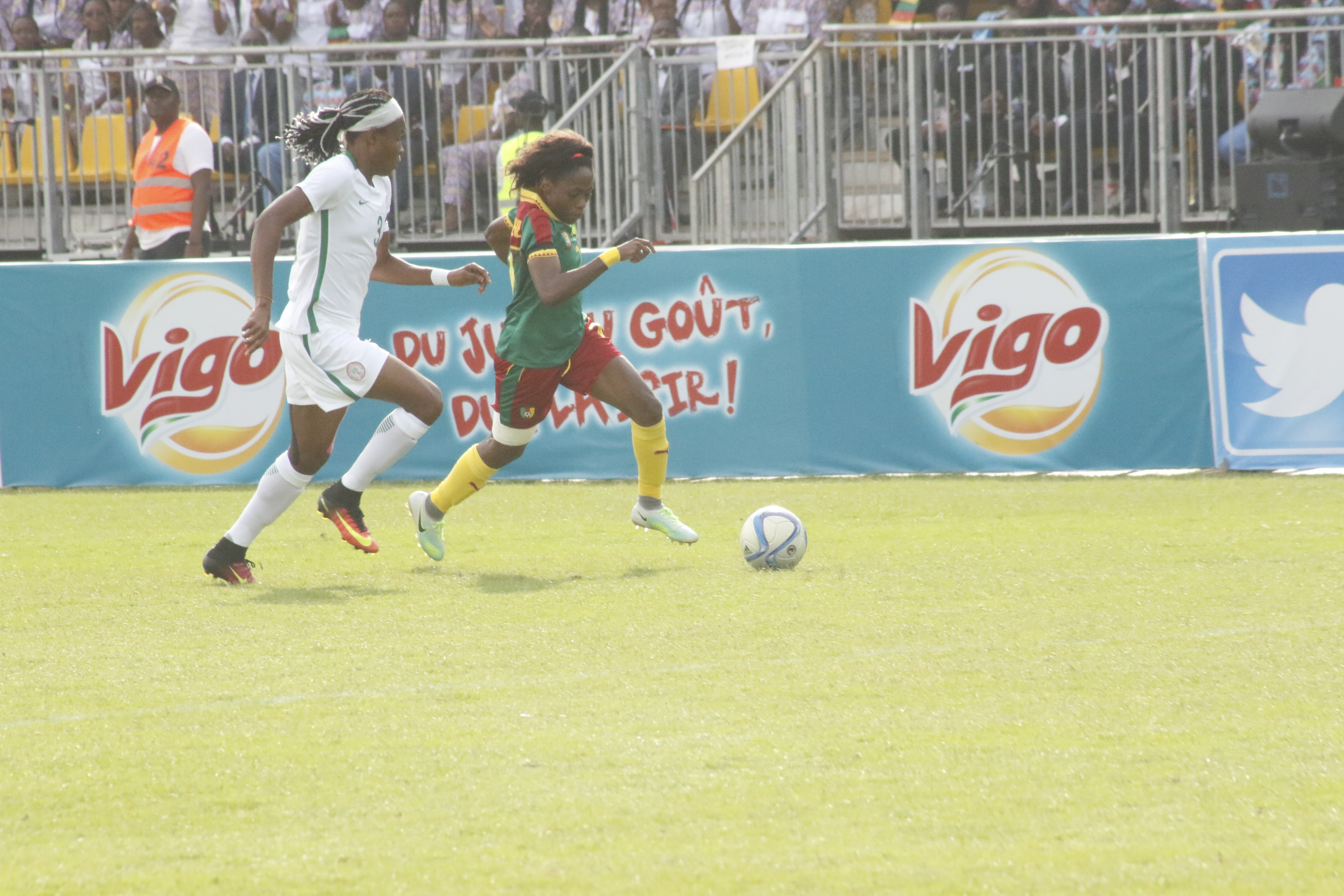
Aboudi Onguene, December 2016

Aboudi Onguéné competed at the 2012 London Olympics and scored the team's lone goal in the tournament. At the 2015 FIFA Women's World Cup in Canada, she scored an equalizer in the team's 2–1 win over Switzerland and was named Player of the Match. She was voted best player at the 2016 Africa Women Cup of Nations.

As of 2018, Aboudi Onguéné has been nominated for African Women's Footballer of the Year four consecutive times.

At the 2019 FIFA Women's World Cup in France, Aboudi Onguéné scored an equalizer against the Netherlands during the team's second group stage match.

== International goals ==
Scores and results list Cameroon's goal tally first.

No.	Date	Venue	Opponent	Score	Result	Competition
1.	28 November 2008	Estadio Internacional, Malabo, Equatorial Guinea	Nigeria	1–1	1–1 (4–3 p)	2008 African Women's Championship
2.	5 June 2010	Stade Ahmadou Ahidjo, Yaoundé, Cameroon	DR Congo	3–0	3–0	2010 African Women's Championship qualification
3.	8 November 2010	Makhulong Stadium, Tembisa, South Africa	Algeria	1–0	2–1	2010 African Women's Championship
4.	31 July 2012	City of Coventry Stadium, Coventry, England	New Zealand	1–3	1–3	2012 Summer Olympics
5.	1 November 2012	Nkoantoma Stadium, Bata, Equatorial Guinea	Ivory Coast	3–1	4–1	2012 African Women's Championship
6.	8 June 2015	BC Place, Vancouver, Canada	Ecuador	5–0	6–0	2015 FIFA Women's World Cup
7.	16 June 2015	Commonwealth Stadium, Edmonton, Canada	Switzerland	1–1	2–1	2015 FIFA Women's World Cup
8.	19 November 2016	Stade Ahmadou Ahidjo, Yaoundé, Cameroon	Egypt	1–0	2–0	2016 Women's Africa Cup of Nations
9.	6 June 2018	Stade Alphonse Massemba-Débat, Brazzaville, Congo	Congo	5–0	5–0	2018 Women's Africa Cup of Nations qualification
10.	9 June 2018	Stade Ahmadou Ahidjo, Yaoundé, Cameroon	Congo	3–0	5–0	2018 Women's Africa Cup of Nations qualification
11.	9 June 2018	Stade Ahmadou Ahidjo, Yaoundé, Cameroon	Congo	4–0	5–0	2018 Women's Africa Cup of Nations qualification
12.	20 November 2018	Accra Sports Stadium, Accra, Ghana	Algeria	1–0	3–0	2018 Women's Africa Cup of Nations
13.	30 November 2018	Cape Coast Sports Stadium, Cape Coast, Ghana	Mali	3–2	3–2	2018 Women's Africa Cup of Nations
14.	15 June 2019	Stade du Hainaut, Valenciennes, France	Netherlands	1–1	1–3	2019 FIFA Women's World Cup
15.	5 March 2020	Stade Ahmadou Ahidjo, Yaoundé, Cameroon	Zambia	2–1	3–2	2020 CAF Women's Olympic Qualifying Tournament
16.	5 March 2020	Stade Ahmadou Ahidjo, Yaoundé, Cameroon	Zambia	3–2	3–2	2020 CAF Women's Olympic Qualifying Tournament
17.	23 February 2022	Independence Stadium, Bakau, Gambia	Gambia	1–0	2–1	2022 Women's Africa Cup of Nations qualification
18.	18 February 2023	Waikato Stadium, Hamilton, New Zealand	Thailand	1–0	2–0	2023 FIFA Women's World Cup qualification
19.	18 February 2023	Waikato Stadium, Hamilton, New Zealand	Thailand	2–0	2–0	2023 FIFA Women's World Cup qualification
20.	8 April 2025	Père Jégo Stadium, Casablanca, Morocco	Morocco	1–0	1–0	Friendly

== Honours ==
Individual

- IFFHS CAF Women's Team of the Decade: 2011–2020
- IFFHS All-time Africa Women's Dream Team: 2021
