= Pachu (footballer, born 1986) =

Equatoguinean footballer

Personal information
- Full name: Maricruz Mangue Oburu Nchama
- Date of birth: 6 March 1986 (age 40)
- Position: Left back

Team information
- Current team: El Gancho
- Number: 9

Senior career*
Years	Team	Apps	(Gls)
2012–2017	Estrellas de E'Waiso Ipola		
2018	Leones Vegetarianos		
2019	El Ejido	13	(2)
2019–	El Gancho	33	(16)

International career
2017–	Equatorial Guinea	1	(0)
- * Club domestic league appearances and goals as of 1 May 2022

Maricruz Mangue Oburu Nchama (born 6 March 1986), sportingly known as Pachu, is an Equatorial Guinean footballer who plays as a left back for Spanish Aragon Segunda Femenina club El Gancho CF and the Equatorial Guinea women's national team.

== Club career ==
Pachu started with Estrellas de E'Waiso Ipola in the Equatoguinean women's football league. She moved to Leones Vegetarianos FC in 2018. She joined Spanish team El Ejido in the winter of 2019.

== International career ==
Pachu made her international debut for Equatorial Guinea on 26 November 2017, coming on as a second-half substitute in a 4–0 home friendly win against Comoros.
