= Maksim Zinovyev =

Russian footballer

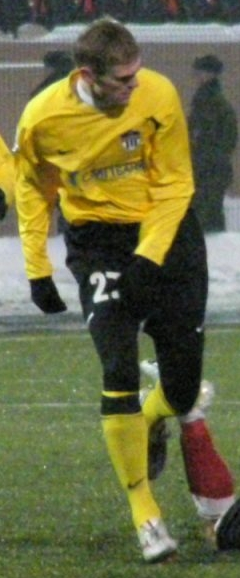
- Maksim Zinovyev in 2009.

Personal information
- Full name: Maksim Yuryevich Zinovyev
- Date of birth: 15 July 1980 (age 46)
- Place of birth: Lipetsk, Russian SFSR
- Height: 1.92 m (6 ft 4 in)
- Position: Defender

Team information
- Current team: ZFK CSKA Moscow (manager)

Senior career*
| Years | Team | Apps | (Gls) |
| 1998 | Khimki | 10 | (0) |
| 1999 | Torpedo-ZIL Moscow | 0 | (0) |
| 2000 | Vityaz Podolsk | 0 | (0) |
| 2001 | GKS Bełchatów | 0 | (0) |
| 2001 | Śląsk Wrocław | 4 | (0) |
| 2002–2003 | Metallurg Lipetsk | 18 | (0) |
| 2004 | Gazovik-Gazprom Izhevsk | 20 | (2) |
| 2005 | Metallurg Lipetsk | 12 | (0) |
| 2005 | Torpedo Zhodino | 8 | (0) |
| 2006 | Dynamo Makhachkala | 23 | (1) |
| 2007 | Baltika Kaliningrad | 28 | (0) |
| 2008 | Volga Ulyanovsk | 30 | (1) |
| 2009 | Khimki | 22 | (1) |
| 2010 | Luch-Energiya Vladivostok | 18 | (0) |
| 2011 | Fakel Voronezh | 13 | (0) |
| 2011–2012 | Torpedo Moscow | 7 | (0) |
| 2012 | Dolgoprudny | 13 | (1) |
| 2013 | Mashuk-KMV Pyatigorsk | 11 | (1) |
| 2013–2014 | Khimki | 17 | (1) |
| 2014–2015 | Domodedovo Moscow | 17 | (2) |
| Total | | 271 | (10) |

Managerial career
- 2015: WFC Rossiyanka
- 2016: ZFK CSKA Moscow
- 2016: WFC Rossiyanka
- 2017–2021: ZFK CSKA Moscow
- 2021–: ZFK CSKA Moscow
- * Club domestic league appearances and goals

Maksim Yuryevich Zinovyev (Russian: Максим Юрьевич Зиновьев; born 15 July 1980) is a Russian professional football manager and former player who played as a defender. He is currently in charge of ZFK CSKA Moscow.

Zinovyev played for FC Khimki in the Russian Premier League and for FC Metallurg Lipetsk in the Russian First Division and Russian Second Division.

== Managerial career ==
In 2015, Zinovyev became the head coach of the women's football team Rossiyanka.

In 2016, he headed the newly created women's football club CSKA Moscow. Under the leadership of Maxim Yuryevich, the team won the Russian Cup (2017, 2022, 2023), and also won the gold medals of the national championship twice (2019, 2020).
