= Rodina Stadium (Khimki) =

Stadium in Russia

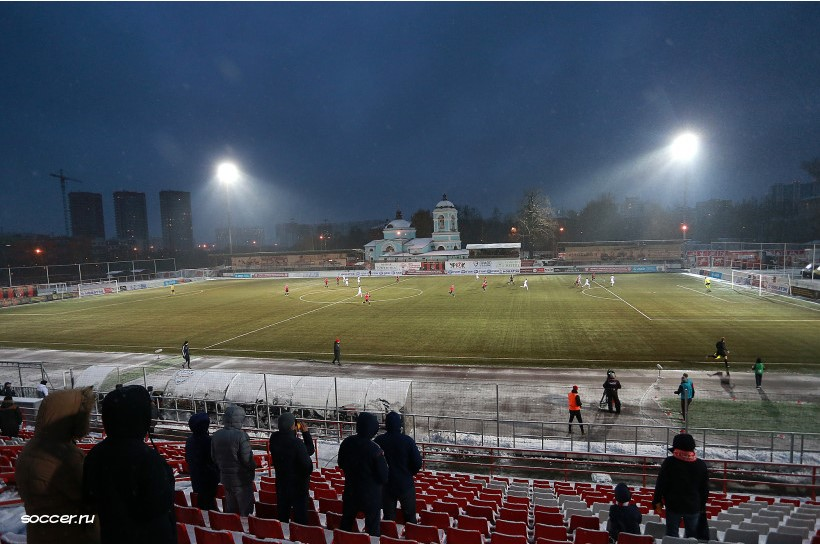
- Interactive map of Rodina Stadium
- Location: Khimki, Russia
- Coordinates: 55°54′11″N 37°27′32″E
- Owner: FC Khimki
- Capacity: 3760
- Surface: Grass
- Field size: 105 x 68

Construction
- Opened: 2007

Tenants
- FC Khimki (2010–present); WFC Rossiyanka

Rodina Stadium is a football stadium in Khimki, Russia. The stadium is owned by FC Khimki.

== See also ==
Other stadiums in Khimki:

- Arena Khimki
- Novye Khimki Stadium
