= Russian Women's Cup =

- Organiser(s): Russian Football Union
- Founded: 1992
- Region: Russia
- Teams: 25 (2023)
- Domestic cup: Russian Women's Super Cup
- Current champions: CSKA Moscow (4th title)
- Most championships: Energy Voronezh; Zvezda-2005 Perm (7 titles)
- Website: wfl.rfs.ru/tournament/1023698
- 2024 Russian Women's Cup

The Russian Women's Cup (Russian: Кубок России) is the national women's football cup competition in Russia. The first edition of the cup was played out in 1992.

== List of finals ==
The list of finals:

Year	Winner	Result	Runner-up
1992	Interros Moskva	4–3 a.e.t.	Spartak Moskva
1993	Energy Voronezh	3–1	Tekstilshchik Ramenskoye
1994	CSK VVS Samara	3–0	Energy Voronezh
1995	Energy Voronezh	4–1, 1–2	CSK VVS Samara
1996	Energy Voronezh	3–1, 4–1	CSK VVS Samara
1997	Energy Voronezh	2–0, 1–1	VDV Ryazan
1998	VDV Ryazan	1–3, w/o	Energy Voronezh
1999	Energy Voronezh	0–0, 1–0 a.e.t.	VDV Ryazan
2000	Energy Voronezh	4–3, 1–1	Ryazan TNK
2001	Energy Voronezh	1–2, 2–0	Ryazan TNK
2002	Lada Togliatti	w/o, w/o	CSK VVS Samara
2003	Lada Togliatti	0–1, 2–1	Energy Voronezh
2004	Lada Togliatti	1–1, 5–2	Rossiyanka Krasnoarmeisk
2005	Rossiyanka Krasnoarmeisk	2–1	Spartak Moskva
2006	Rossiyanka Krasnoarmeisk	3–0^{[A]} 1–1	Spartak Moskva
2007	Zvezda-2005 Perm	2–1, 0–0	Rossiyanka Krasnoarmeisk
2008	Rossiyanka Krasnoarmeisk	1–0	Zvezda-2005 Perm
2009	Rossiyanka Krasnoarmeisk	3–1	Zvezda-2005 Perm
2010	Rossiyanka Krasnoarmeisk	2–1	Energy Voronezh
2012	Zvezda-2005 Perm	2–1	Zorkiy Krasnogorsk
2013	Zvezda-2005 Perm	2–1 a.e.t.	CSP Izmailovo
2014	VDV Ryazan	5–0	Kubanochka Krasnodar
2015	Zvezda-2005 Perm	1–0	Kubanochka Krasnodar
2016	Zvezda-2005 Perm	5–2	Kubanochka Krasnodar
2017	CSKA Moscow	1–0	Chertanovo Moscow
2018	Zvezda-2005 Perm	1–0	Ryazan-VDV
2019	Zvezda-2005 Perm	2–0	Ryazan-VDV
2020	Lokomotiv Moscow	0–0; 4–2 (p)	CSKA Moscow
2021	Lokomotiv Moscow	1–0	Zenit Saint Petersburg
2022	CSKA Moscow	2–1	Zenit Saint Petersburg
2023	CSKA Moscow	4–1	Zenit Saint Petersburg
2024	Lokomotiv Moscow	2–0	CSKA Moscow
2025	CSKA Moscow	0–0; 4–3 (p)	Zenit Saint Petersburg

^{A} Match awarded

== See also ==
- Russian Cup, men's edition
