= Novye Khimki Stadium =

Football stadium in Russia

Coordinates: 55.8918°N 37.408061°E

Novye Khimki Stadium is football stadium in Khimki, Russia. It is the home ground of youth teams of FC Khimki, although it is sometimes used by senior team. The stadium holds 3,066 people. The football pitch was constructed in 1999, and the stands were built in 2006.

== History ==
In 1999 a football, ice hockey and futsal pitches were constructed at the current stadium site. The stadium was reconstructed in 2006 and opened in its reconstructed version in 2007. The opening ceremony was visited by Dmitry Medvedev.

Stadium is mostly used by youth teams of FC Khimki. In 2015 another reconstruction took place, during which the gym, theoretical sessions room, coach rooms were built and amount of dressing rooms and medical rooms was increased.

During its history, Novye Khimki Stadium hosted several Russian Cup matches. The hosts were FC Khimki, FC Zelenograd and FC Torpedo-ZIL Moscow.

== See also ==
Other stadiums in Khimki:

- Rodina Stadium
- Arena Khimki
