= Margarita Chernomyrdina =

Russian footballer (born 1996)

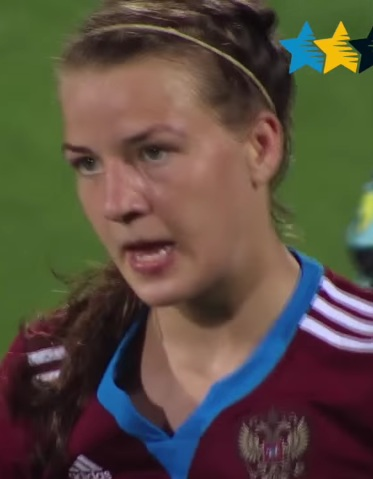

Personal information
- Full name: Margarita Chernomyrdina
- Date of birth: 6 March 1996 (age 30)
- Place of birth: Moscow, Russia
- Height: 1.64 m (5 ft 4 1/2 in)
- Position: Midfielder

Team information
- Current team: CSKA Moscow
- Number: 70

Senior career*
Years	Team	Apps	(Gls)
2011–2018	Chertanovo Moscow	62	(19)
2019–	CSKA Moscow	48	(10)

International career^{‡}
2014–	Russia	30	(6)
Medal record
Women's football
Representing Russia
Summer Universiade
Bronze medal – third place	2017 Taipei	Women's
- * Club domestic league appearances and goals as of 2:10, 28 June 2019 (UTC) ‡ National team caps and goals as of 2 March 2016

Margarita Alekseyevna Chernomyrdina (Russian: Маргарита Алексеевна Черномырдина; born 6 March 1996) is a Russian footballer who plays as a midfielder for the Russia women's national football team. She was part of the team at the 2016 Algarve Cup. At the club level, she has played for Chertanovo Moscow in Russia.

== International goals ==
No.	Date	Venue	Opponent	Score	Result	Competition
1.	6 March 2017	VRS António Sports Complex, Vila Real de Santo António, Portugal	Denmark	1–1	1–6	2017 Algarve Cup
2.	30 August 2019	Ob Jezeru City Stadium, Velenje, Slovenia	Slovenia	1–0	1–0	UEFA Women's Euro 2022 qualifying
3.	27 October 2020	Sapsan Arena, Moscow, Russia	Turkey	2–0	4–2	UEFA Women's Euro 2022 qualifying
4.	27 October 2020	Sapsan Arena, Moscow, Russia	Turkey	3–0	4–2	UEFA Women's Euro 2022 qualifying
5.	20 February 2021	Gold City Sports Complex, Kargıcak, Turkey	India	2–0	8–0	2021 Turkish Women's Cup
6.	20 February 2021	Gold City Sports Complex, Kargıcak, Turkey	India	4–0	8–0	2021 Turkish Women's Cup
7.	25 November 2021	Dalga Arena, Baku, Azerbaijan	Azerbaijan	4–0	4–0	2023 FIFA Women's World Cup qualification
