= Ekaterina Pantyukhina =

Russian footballer (born 1993)

Personal information
- Full name: Ekaterina Pantyukhina
- Date of birth: 9 April 1993 (age 33)
- Place of birth: Vyatskiye Polyany, Russia
- Position: Forward

Team information
- Current team: Zenit

Senior career*
Years	Team	Apps	(Gls)
2011–2020	Zvezda Perm	154	(46)
2021-	Zenit	44	(10)

International career
2011–2012	Russia U19	9	(1)
2013–	Russia	30	(9)
Medal record
Women's football
Representing Russia
Summer Universiade
Bronze medal – third place	2017 Taipei	Women's
- * Club domestic league appearances and goals as of 16:40, 12 September 2022 (UTC)

Ekaterina Igorevna Pantyukhina (Russian: Екатерина Игоревна Пантюхина; born 9 April 1993) is a Russian football forward, currently playing for Zenit.

== Honours ==
Zvezda Perm

Winner

- Russian Women's Football Championship: 2014
- Russian Women's Cup: 2012, 2013

Runners-up

- Russian Women's Football Championship: 2013

== International career ==
Goals scored for the Russian WNT in official competitions
Competition	Stage	Date	Location	Opponent	Goals	Result	Overall
2015 FIFA World Cup	Qualifiers	2014–04–05	Khimki	Slovenia	1	4–1	7
2015 FIFA World Cup	Qualifiers	2014–04–09	Khimki	Croatia	1	1–0	7
2015 FIFA World Cup	Qualifiers	2014–05–07	Dublin	Republic of Ireland	2	3–1	7
2015 FIFA World Cup	Qualifiers	2014–08–21	Samara	Slovakia	1	3–1	7
2015 FIFA World Cup	Qualifiers	2014–09–17	Zagreb	Croatia	2	3–1	7
2017 UEFA Euro	Qualifiers	2016–06–02	Khimki	Turkey	1	2–0	2
2017 UEFA Euro	Qualifiers	2016–09–20	Khimki	Croatia	1	5–0	2
