= Kubanochka Krasnodar =

Kubanochka
- Full name: Football Club Kubanochka Krasnodar
- Founded: 1988 / 2007
- Dissolved: 2020
- Ground: Trud Stadium; Kuban Stadium; Andrey-Arena, Afipsky
- Capacity: 3,000; 35,200; 3,000
- League: Russian championship
- 2019: 3rd
Home colours

FK Kubanochka Krasnodar was a Russian women's football team, competed in the Russian Women's Football Championship.

== History ==
Founded in 1988 as Zhemchuzhina Krasnodar, it took its current shortly after the dissolution of the Soviet Union. Kubanochka chained two consecutive promotions to reach the top division in 1996. In its first season the team ranked 6th. In 2000 Kubanochka was 4th, their best result to date, but the team was disbanded following the end of the season.

The club was reestablished in 2007. The new Kubanochka was 5th in the Second Level in its first season. In 2009 the team was promoted after succeeding in its second try in the promotion play-offs. In its return to the national top division Kubanochka was last with 5 points, but kept its spot as the category was expanded to eight teams.

In 2014 they lost the Russian Cup final to VDV Ryazan.

On 2020 the club has been dissolved.
