= Nadezhda Smirnova =

Russian footballer (born 1996)

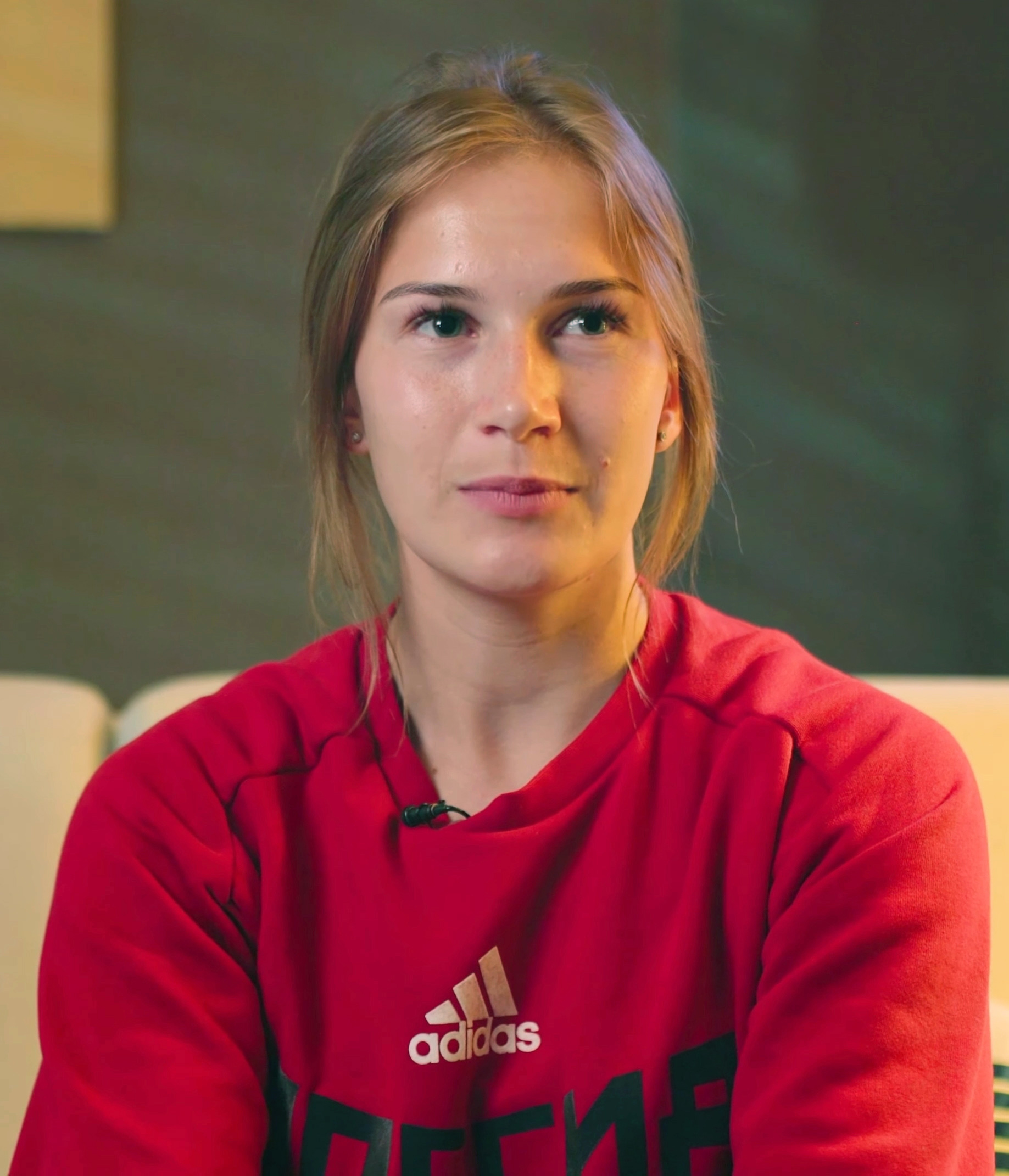
- Smirnova in 2021

Personal information
- Full name: Nadezhda Smirnova
- Date of birth: 22 February 1996 (age 30)
- Place of birth: Sergiyev Posad, Russia
- Position: Midfielder

Team information
- Current team: CSKA Moscow
- Number: 10

Senior career*
Years	Team	Apps	(Gls)
2014	Rossiyanka	3	(0)
2015	Zorky	13	(2)
2016	Rossiyanka	9	(0)
2016–	CSKA Moscow	56	(20)

International career^{‡}
2013-2015	Russia U19	8	(3)
2016–	Russia	31	(12)
- * Club domestic league appearances and goals as of 02:20, 25 November 2019 (UTC) ‡ National team caps and goals as of 20:00, 6 March 2020

Nadezhda Smirnova (born 22 February 1996) is a Russian footballer who plays for CSKA Moscow and the Russia national team.

She played for Russia at UEFA Women's Euro 2017.

== International goals ==
No.	Date	Venue	Opponent	Score	Result	Competition
1.	5 April 2018	Bosnia and Herzegovina FA Training Centre, Zenica, Bosnia & Herzegovina	Bosnia and Herzegovina	4–1	6–1	2019 FIFA Women's World Cup qualification
2.	5 April 2018	Bosnia and Herzegovina FA Training Centre, Zenica, Bosnia & Herzegovina	Bosnia and Herzegovina	6–1	6–1	2019 FIFA Women's World Cup qualification
3.	9 April 2018	Astana Arena, Nur-Sultan, Kazakhstan	Kazakhstan	2–0	3–0	2019 FIFA Women's World Cup qualification
4.	9 April 2018	Astana Arena, Nur-Sultan, Kazakhstan	Kazakhstan	3–0	3–0	2019 FIFA Women's World Cup qualification
5.	4 April 2019	Hankou Cultural Sports Centre, Wuhan, China	China	1–0	1–4	2019 Wuhan International Tournament
6.	7 April 2019	Hankou Cultural Sports Centre, Wuhan, China	Croatia	1–0	3–0	2019 Wuhan International Tournament
7.	6 March 2020	Brita-Arena, Wiesbaden, Germany	Kosovo	3–0	5–0	UEFA Women's Euro 2022 qualifying
8.	6 March 2020	Brita-Arena, Wiesbaden, Germany	Kosovo	5–0	5–0	UEFA Women's Euro 2022 qualifying
9.	14 June 2021	Estadio Cartagonova, Cartagena, Spain	Finland	1–0	1–0	Friendly
10.	21 September 2021	Sportivnyy Gorodok, Moscow, Russia	Montenegro	2–0	5–0	2023 FIFA Women's World Cup qualification
11.	21 September 2021	Sportivnyy Gorodok, Moscow, Russia	Montenegro	3–0	5–0	2023 FIFA Women's World Cup qualification
12.	21 September 2021	Sportivnyy Gorodok, Moscow, Russia	Montenegro	4–0	5–0	2023 FIFA Women's World Cup qualification
13.	27 February 2024	Belek Football Training Camp, Antalya, Turkey	Botswana	3–0	4–0	Friendly
14.	4 April 2024	Belek Football Training Camp, Antalya, Turkey	Ecuador	1–0	4–0	Friendly
15.	1 July 2025	Serbian FA Sports Center, Stara Pazova, Serbia	Serbia	1–0	3–0	Friendly
16.	28 February 2026	Al Hamriya Sports Club Stadium, Al Hamriyah, United Arab Emirates	Tanzania	2–0	4–1	2026 Pink Ladies Cup
17.	28 February 2026	Al Hamriya Sports Club Stadium, Al Hamriyah, United Arab Emirates	Tanzania	3–0	4–1	2026 Pink Ladies Cup
