= Sapsan Arena =

Football stadium in Moscow, Russia

Coordinates: 55.8065°N 37.7377°E

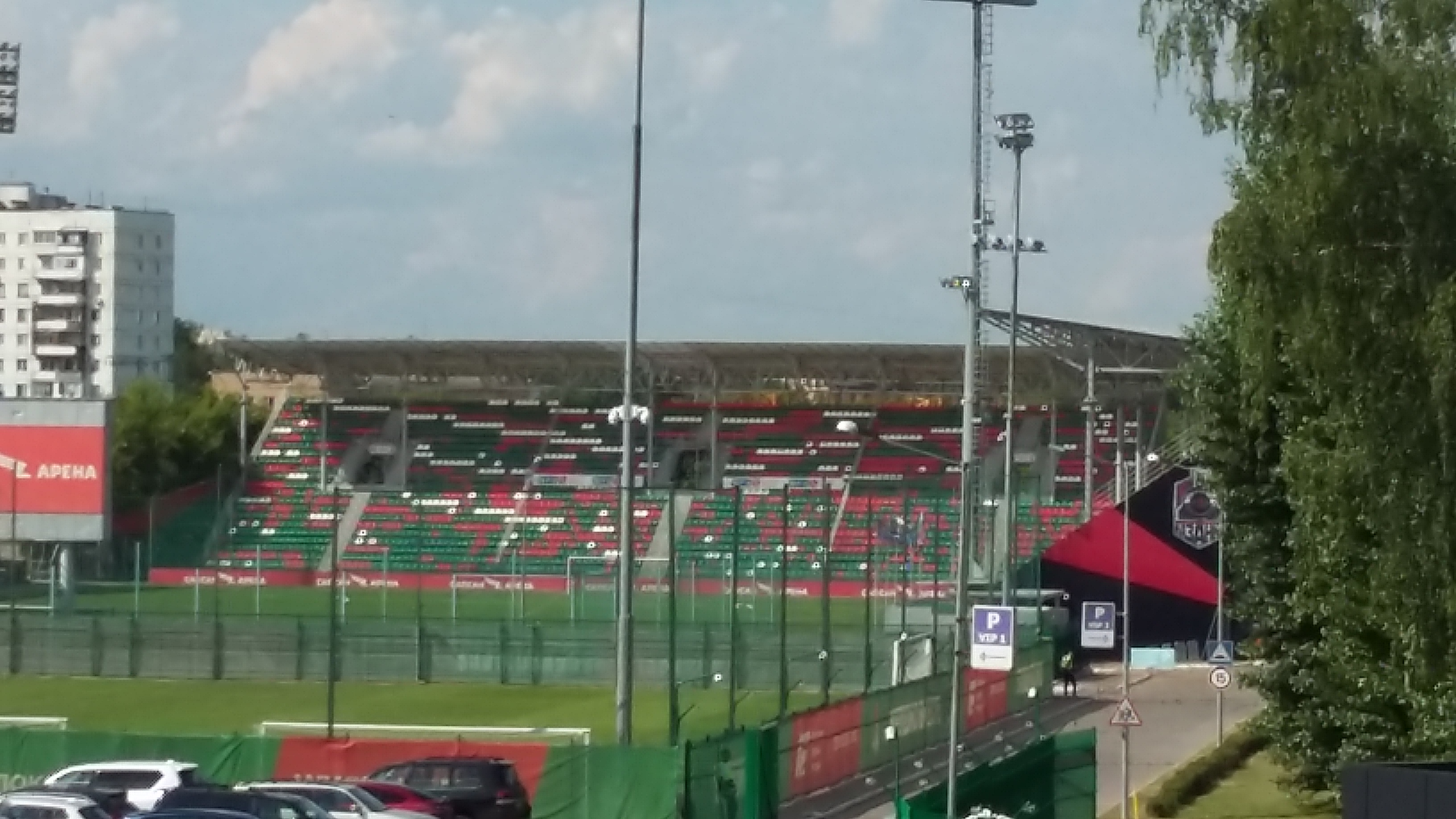
- Interactive map of Sapsan Arena
- Former names: Minor Sports Arena Lokomotiv
- Location: Moscow, Russia
- Owner: Russian Railways
- Operator: Lokomotiv Moscow
- Capacity: 6,000
- Surface: Artificial Turf
- Field size: 105m × 68m
- Public transit: Cherkizovskaya; Lokomotiv

Construction
- Opened: 2009
- Expanded: 2012

Tenants
- Kazanka Moscow; Lokomotiv Moscow (youths); WFC Lokomotiv; Moscow Patriots; Chertanovo Moscow (in winter)

Sapsan Arena (Russian: «Сапсан Арена») is a football stadium situated in Moscow, Russia. It hosts Kazanka Moscow, Lokomotiv Moscow's farm club, and Lokomotiv Moscow's youth team. It seats 6,000 people.

== History ==
The stadium was built in 2009 and its initial capacity stood at 5000, all seated. It is the home stadium of the youth squad of Lokomotiv. It was also used by Lokomotiv-2, prior to their disbandment. The stadium was further expanded in the winter of 2010, and as a result nowadays the stadium is capable to hold 6,000 people, all seated. In addition to the expansion, all the three stands were covered under a roof.

On 5 August 2017, Lokomotiv announced that the stadium has been renamed to Sapsan Arena

== Description ==
It is situated adjacent to the main Lokomotiv Moscow stadium, the RZD Arena. Its surface is artificial turf.
