= WFC Lokomotiv Moscow =

- Full name: Женский футбольный клуб "Локомоти́в" Москва́ (Women Football Club Lokomotiv Moscow)
- Founded: 14 February 2018; 7 years ago
- Ground: Sapsan Arena, Moscow
- Capacity: 10,000
- Chairman: Alexander Sidorovskiy
- Manager: Elena Fomina
- League: Russian Women's Football Championship
- 2025: 4th
- Website: http://www.fclm.ru/?club/club-info
Home colours	Away colours

WFC Lokomotiv Moscow (Russian: Женский футбольный клуб "Локомоти́в" Москва́, ZhFK Lokomotiv Moskva) is a Russian Women's association football club based in Moscow. Lokomotiv participates in the Russian Women's Football Championship, the top division of Russian women football, and is affiliated with Lokomotiv Moscow.

Winner of the “golden double” (winning both the league and cup titles in the same season) — in the 2021 season.

== History ==
WFC Lokomotiv was established on 14 February 2018 The current head coach of the Russia women's national football team, Elena Fomina, was appointed as the club's first manager.

The team finished the first season of the 2018 Championship in 6th place. Over the next five years, the team became the champion (2021), silver medalist (2019, 2020), and bronze medalist (2022, 2023), as well as three-time winner of the (2020, 2021, 2024) and Super Cup (2021, 2022) winners in Russia.

As of October 2025, the team is ranked 113th in the UEFA rankings.

== Current squad ==
As of 19 May 2025

Note: Flags indicate national team as defined under FIFA eligibility rules; some limited exceptions apply. Players may hold more than one non-FIFA nationality.

No.	Pos.	Nation	Player
1	GK	RUS	Tatyana Shcherbak
4	DF	RUS	Nasiba Gasanova
5	DF	RUS	Vladislava Butkevich
7	DF	RUS	Anna Belomyttseva
8	DF	BLR	Anna Kozyupa
10	MF	BRA	Layssa
11	FW	RUS	Liana Yukhaeva
13	DF	RUS	Alsu Abdullina
14	DF	RUS	Kristina Mashkova
16	MF	RUS	Yana Sheina
17	MF	SRB	Elena Chubrilo
20	FW	RUS	Valeria Bizenkova
22	FW	RUS	Glafira Zhukova
23	DF	RUS	Aleksandra Lazarevich

No.	Pos.	Nation	Player
25	FW	RUS	Ksenia Kaurova
28	GK	KGZ	Angelina Gayer
29	MF	RUS	Viktoria Kozlova
30	GK	RUS	Ksenia Agapkina
41	FW	RUS	Anna Solovyeva
63	DF	RUS	Vasilisa Lakeyeva
66	MF	RUS	Alisa Mishurina
67	MF	RUS	Azalia Zalmieva
75	MF	RUS	Polina Yuklyaeva
77	MF	RUS	Viktoria Shkoda
88	MF	RUS	Darya Golovina
89	FW	GAM	Ola Buwaro
99	MF	BLR	Anastasia Linnik

== Stadium ==
The club plays its home games at the Sapsan Arena, which is situated a few metres away from Lokomotiv's main stadium, the RZD Arena.

== Honours ==
- Russian Women's Football Championship (1): 2021
- Russian Women's Cup (3): 2020, 2021, 2024
- Russian Super Cup (2): 2021, 2022

== See also ==
- FC Lokomotiv Moscow
- FC Kazanka Moscow
- RC Lokomotiv Moscow
