= Ryazan-VDV =

Ryazan
- Full name: Football Club Ryazan-VDV
- Founded: 1996
- Ground: Spartak Stadium, Ryazan
- Capacity: 6,000
- Manager: Konstantin Klimashin
- League: Russian Championship
- 2025: 9th
- Website: http://r-vdv.ru/
Home colours	Away colours

Ryazan-VDV (Russian: Рязань-ВДВ) is a Russian women's football team from Ryazan.

== History ==
Founded in 1996, it won two league titles and one cup in the last years of the twentieth century. Ryazan-VDV was the first team to represent Russia in the UEFA Women's Cup.

Around 2013 a team of Russian and Ukrainian nationals was formed, winning a league title in 2013 and the Russian Cup in 2014. The club played in the 2014–15 UEFA Women's Champions League.

== Honours ==
=== Official ===
- Russian championship (4): 1999, 2000, 2013, 2018
- Russian Women's Cup (2): 1998, 2014

=== Invitational ===
- Albena Cup (1): 2003

Season	Division	Place	National Cup
1996	2	2nd	1st Round
1997	1	3rd	Runner-up
1998	1	3rd	Winner
1999	1	1st	Runner-up
2000	1	1st	Runner-up
2001	1	3rd	Runner-up
2002	1	3rd	Quarterfinals
2003	1	4th	Round of 16
2004	1	?	Round of 16
2005	1	4th	Semifinals
2006	1	4th	Semifinals
2007	1	6th	Semifinals
2008	1	4th	Round of 16
2009	1	5th	Quarterfinals
2010	1	5th	Quarterfinals
2011–12	1	6th	Quarterfinals
2012–13	1	3rd	
2013	1	1st	
2014	1	3rd	Winner
2015	1	4th	
2016	1	3rd	
2017	1	2nd	Runner-Up
2018	1	1st	Runner-Up
2019	1	5th	Runner-Up

== Current squad ==
As of 21 March 2021.

Note: Flags indicate national team as defined under FIFA eligibility rules; some limited exceptions apply. Players may hold more than one non-FIFA nationality.

No.	Pos.	Nation	Player
—	GK	RUS	Maria Zhamanakova
8	MF	RUS	Maria Oldenburger
10	MF	RUS	Ekaterina Zavadkina
16	MF	RUS	Elizavita Elagina
—	MF	SRB	Tijana Matić
—	DF	RUS	Ksenia Lazareva
—	MF	UKR	Alina Skydan
26	MF	RUS	Anna Sinyutina
32	MF	RUS	Natalia Perepechina
77	MF	RUS	Victoria Solina

No.	Pos.	Nation	Player
—	GK	RUS	Violetta Isaykina
—	FW	BLR	Viktoria Tikhon
—	MF	KAZ	Karina Zhumabaikyzy
—	DF	SRB	Nikoleta Nikolič
—	MF	ARM	Tatiana Dolmatova

== Former players ==
Players listed in bold have had caps for their respective countries

- (Russia) Anna Astapenko (2009–2010)
- (Russia) **Natalia Barbashina** (1999–2001)
- (Russia) **Elena Danilova** (2005)
- (Russia) **Marina Kolomiets** (2001)
- (Russia) **Anastasia Kostyukova** (2005–2006)
- (Russia) **Olga Letyushova**
- (Russia) **Elena Morozova**
- (Russia) **Olesya Mashina** (2009–2010)
- (Russia) **Olga Sergaeva** (1998–1999, 2002–2003)
- (Russia) **Elena Terekhova** (2005)
- (Russia) **Elvira Todua** (2005–2007)
- (Russia) **Tatiana Zaitseva**
- (Moldova) **Elena Turcan**
- (Ukraine) **Daryna Apanaschenko** (2005–2008)
- (Ukraine) **Veronika Shulga** (2000–2001, 2010)
- (Ukraine) **Natalia Zinchenko** (1997–2002, 2005–2006)

== UEFA competitions ==
Ryazan played the first season of the UEFA Women's Cup and reached the quarter-finals.

Season	Competition	Stage	Result	Opponent
2001–02	UEFA Women's Cup	Qualifying Stage	4–0	(Netherlands) Ter Leede
2001–02	UEFA Women's Cup	Qualifying Stage	11–0	(Greece) Kavala
2001–02	UEFA Women's Cup	Qualifying Stage	13–0	(Slovakia) SKF Žilina
2001–02	UEFA Women's Cup	Quarter-finals	1–4, 1–3	(Sweden) Umeå IK
2014–15	Champions League	Round of 32	1–3, 0–2	(Sweden) FC Rosengård
2018–19	Champions League	Round of 32	0–1, 0–2	(Sweden) FC Rosengård
2019–20	Champions League	Round of 32	0–9, 0–7	(France) Lyon
