= FC Chertanovo Moscow =

- Full name: Football Club Chertanovo Moscow
- Nickname: Cherti (The Devils)
- Founded: 1993
- Ground: Arena Chertanovo
- Capacity: 490
- Owner: Chertanovo Education Center
- Chairman: Ilya Savchenko
- Manager: Ilya Rodkin
- League: Russian Second League, Division B, Group 2
- 2026: 3rd
- Website: chertanovoclub.com
Home colours	Away colours

FC Chertanovo Moscow (Russian: «Чертаново» (Москва)) is a Russian professional football club based in Chertanovo, Moscow who play in the Russian Second League Division B, the fourth tier of Russian football. It is the senior team of the Chertanovo Football Academy.

== History ==
They played professionally from 1993 to 1997 before dropping into the amateur leagues and then returning to the professional leagues, the Russian Professional Football League (3rd tier) in the 2014–15 season. The club won the West zone of the PFL in the 2017–18 season and was promoted to the second-tier Russian Football National League for the first time in their history ahead of the 2018–19 season.

In 2019–20, during their second season in the second division, the campaign was cut short by the COVID-19 pandemic, with the final table showing them in third place, one spot and one point below the promotion zone with more than 10 matches left to play.

Before the 2020–21 season, Chertanovo's head coach Igor Osinkin and 8 leading players transferred to PFC Krylia Sovetov Samara. As a consequence, Chertanovo finished second from the bottom in the season and was relegated back to PFL. Meanwhile, Krylia Sovetov won the FNL season and were promoted back to Russian Premier League and also reached the final of the 2020–21 Russian Cup. The transfers to Krylia Sovetov continued in the consequent seasons.

Several players who moved from Chertanovo to Krylia Sovetov were later called up to the Russia national football team, including Aleksandr Soldatenkov, Anton Zinkovsky, Maksim Glushenkov, Danil Prutsev, Roman Yezhov, Sergei Pinyayev, Aleksandr Kovalenko and Yuri Gorshkov.

== Team name history ==
- 1993: FC SUO Moscow
- 1994–present: FC Chertanovo Moscow

== Current squad ==
As of 11 September 2026, according to the Second League website.

Note: Flags indicate national team as defined under FIFA eligibility rules; some limited exceptions apply. Players may hold more than one non-FIFA nationality.

No.	Pos.	Nation	Player
1	GK	RUS	Ilya Melnikov
2	DF	RUS	Ivan Polyakov
3	DF	RUS	Artyom Lagosha
4	DF	RUS	Dmitry Yermolayev
5	DF	RUS	Zakhar Yevdachev
6	DF	RUS	Georgy Zubakin
7	MF	RUS	Ramil Gaynullin (on loan from Pari Nizhny Novgorod)
9	FW	RUS	Matvey Melnikov
10	MF	RUS	Sergey Rebrov
13	DF	RUS	Vladimir Bartasevich
14	FW	RUS	Savely Shumilov
15	MF	RUS	Vadim Agafontsev
16	GK	RUS	Danila Manyak
17	MF	RUS	Semyon Semyonov
18	MF	RUS	Daniil Korunov
20	MF	RUS	Mikhail Surodin
21	DF	RUS	Dmitry Kondrashov
22	MF	RUS	Arseny Tarasov

No.	Pos.	Nation	Player
24	DF	RUS	Lev Polyakov
27	MF	RUS	German Mikadze
30	GK	RUS	Aleksey Osipov
33	MF	RUS	Valentin Atayan
41	DF	RUS	Ilya Pushkin
42	MF	RUS	Mikhail Grachyov
45	DF	RUS	Iv-Pulumde Nikiyema
49	MF	RUS	Lev Akimov
52	MF	RUS	Yegor Kavtrev (on loan from Pari Nizhny Novgorod)
63	MF	RUS	Arda Gadzhiyev
66	FW	RUS	Ilya Nekrasov
68	MF	RUS	Sergey Oleynik
69	MF	RUS	Timur Seitov
70	MF	RUS	Aleksandr Koledov
71	MF	RUS	Georgy Safronov (on loan from Pari Nizhny Novgorod)
77	MF	RUS	Danil Puzanov
88	MF	RUS	Nikita Andreyev
