= 2018 in Swedish football =

Football in Sweden
- Season: 2018

Men's football
- Allsvenskan: AIK
- Svenska Cupen: Djurgårdens IF

The 2018 season is the 121st season of competitive football in Sweden. Sweden participated in the 2018 FIFA World Cup after finishing 2nd in qualifying, and beating Italy in the play-offs. The team reached the quarter-finals, where they were knocked-out by England by the score of 0–2.

== Domestic results ==
=== Men's football ===
==== Allsvenskan ====
Pos	Team	Pld	W	D	L	GF	GA	GD	Pts	Qualification or relegation
1	AIK (C)	30	19	10	1	50	16	+34	67	Qualification for the Champions League first qualifying round
2	IFK Norrköping	30	19	8	3	51	27	+24	65	Qualification for the Europa League first qualifying round
3	Malmö FF	30	17	7	6	57	29	+28	58	Qualification for the Europa League first qualifying round
4	Hammarby IF	30	17	7	6	56	35	+21	58	
5	BK Häcken	30	16	5	9	58	27	+31	53	Qualification for the Europa League second qualifying round (Note: BK Häcken qualified for the Europa League second qualifying round by winning the 2018–19 Svenska Cupen.)
6	Östersunds FK	30	15	4	11	51	39	+12	49	
7	Djurgårdens IF	30	13	9	8	40	31	+9	48	
8	GIF Sundsvall	30	12	8	10	47	35	+12	44	
9	Örebro SK	30	9	8	13	34	40	−6	35	
10	Kalmar FF	30	9	7	14	27	35	−8	34	
11	IFK Göteborg	30	9	4	17	38	53	−15	31	
12	IF Elfsborg	30	7	9	14	29	41	−12	30	
13	IK Sirius	30	8	6	16	37	61	−24	30	
14	IF Brommapojkarna (R)	30	8	2	20	25	64	−39	26	Qualification for the relegation play-offs
15	Dalkurd FF (R)	30	6	6	18	30	57	−27	24	Relegation to the Superettan
16	Trelleborgs FF (R)	30	3	6	21	24	64	−40	15	Relegation to the Superettan

Source: svenskfotboll.se (in Swedish)
Rules for classification: 1) Points; 2) Goal difference; 3) Goals scored; 4) Head-to-head points; 5) Head-to-head goal difference; 6) Head-to-head away goals scored; 7) Play-off
(Note: Play-off is only played if need to decide champion, teams for relegation or UEFA competition and will be played on a neutral ground).
(C) Champions; (R) Relegated

===== Playoffs =====
22 November 2018
19:00 (UTC+1)

AFC Eskilstuna	0–1	IF Brommapojkarna
	Report	Lahne 12'

Tunavallen, Eskilstuna
Attendance: 3,465
Referee: Stefan Johannesson

25 November 2018
14:45 (UTC+1)

IF Brommapojkarna	1–2	AFC Eskilstuna
Öhman 39'	Report	Nnamani 65'; Ajeti 75'

Grimsta IP, Stockholm
Attendance: 1,925
Referee: Andreas Ekberg

2–2 on aggregate. AFC Eskilstuna won on away goals.

==== Superettan ====
Pos	Team	Pld	W	D	L	GF	GA	GD	Pts	Promotion, qualification or relegation
1	Helsingborgs IF (C, P)	30	18	9	3	59	30	+29	63	Promotion to Allsvenskan
2	Falkenbergs FF (P)	30	18	5	7	61	34	+27	59	Promotion to Allsvenskan
3	AFC Eskilstuna (O, P)	30	13	15	2	40	16	+24	54	Qualification to Promotion playoffs
4	Örgryte IS	30	15	7	8	56	37	+19	52	
5	Halmstads BK	30	15	6	9	49	38	+11	51	
6	IK Brage	30	12	9	9	46	45	+1	45	
7	Degerfors IF	30	11	9	10	45	46	−1	42	
8	Östers IF	30	11	8	11	48	43	+5	41	
9	IK Frej	30	10	7	13	46	56	−10	37	
10	GAIS	30	8	11	11	40	41	−1	35	
11	Jönköpings Södra IF	30	9	8	13	31	38	−7	35	
12	Norrby IF	30	9	7	14	31	50	−19	34	
13	IFK Värnamo (R)	30	9	5	16	31	48	−17	32	Qualification to Relegation playoffs
14	Varbergs BoIS (O)	30	7	8	15	43	54	−11	29	Qualification to Relegation playoffs
15	Gefle IF (R)	30	6	7	17	31	60	−29	25	Relegation to Division 1
16	Landskrona BoIS (R)	30	5	7	18	35	56	−21	22	Relegation to Division 1

Source: svenskfotboll.se (in Swedish)
Rules for classification: 1) Points; 2) Goal difference; 3) Number of goals scored; 4) Head-to-head points; 5) Head-to-head goal difference; 6) Head-to-head away goals scored
(C) Champions; (O) Play-off winners; (P) Promoted; (R) Relegated

===== Playoffs =====
14 November 2018
19:00 (UTC+1)

Syrianska FC	1–0	IFK Värnamo
Hellberg 48' (pen.)	Report

Södertälje Fotbollsarena, Södertälje
Attendance: 2,103
Referee: Adam Ladebäck
14 November 2018
16:45 (UTC+1)

Oskarshamns AIK	4–2	Varbergs BoIS
Skogh 4'; Kvist 44', 58'; Christensson 71'	Report	Krezić 66'; Modig 90+3'

Arena Oskarshamn, Oskarshamn
Attendance: 2,029
Referee: Fredrik Klitte

18 November 2018
14:30 (UTC+1)

IFK Värnamo	2–2	Syrianska FC
Achinioti-Jönsson 50'; Henningsson 82'	Report	Rajalakso 45+1'; Ranégie 90+1'

Finnvedsvallen, Värnamo
Attendance: 1,526
Referee: Victor Wolf

Syrianska FC won 3–2 on aggregate.

18 November 2018
14:30 (UTC+1)

Varbergs BoIS	2–0	Oskarshamns AIK
Emeh 20'; Ejupi 41'	Report

Påskbergsvallen, Varberg
Attendance: 1,364
Referee: Granit Maqedonci

4–4 on aggregate. Varbergs BoIS won on away goals.

== National teams ==
=== Sweden men's national football team ===
==== 2018 FIFA World Cup ====
===== Group stage =====
Pos	Team	Pld	W	D	L	GF	GA	GD	Pts	Qualification
1	Sweden	3	2	0	1	5	2	+3	6	Advance to knockout stage
2	Mexico	3	2	0	1	3	4	−1	6	Advance to knockout stage
3	South Korea	3	1	0	2	3	3	0	3	
4	Germany	3	1	0	2	2	4	−2	3	

Source: FIFA
Rules for classification: Group stage tiebreakers

Win Draw Loss

18 June 2018 Group F	Sweden	1–0	South Korea	Nizhny Novgorod, Russia
15:00 (UTC+3)	Granqvist 65' (pen.)	Report (FIFA); Report		Stadium: Nizhny Novgorod Stadium; Attendance: 42,300; Referee: Joel Aguilar (El Salvador)

23 June 2018 Group F	Germany	2–1	Sweden	Sochi, Russia
21:00 (UTC+3)	Reus 48'; Kroos 90+5'	Report (FIFA); Report	Toivonen 32'	Stadium: Fisht Olympic Stadium; Attendance: 44,287; Referee: Szymon Marciniak (Poland)

27 June 2018 Group F	Mexico	0–3	Sweden	Yekaterinburg, Russia
19:00 (UTC+5)		Report (FIFA); Report	Augustinsson 50'; Granqvist 62' (pen.); Álvarez 74' (o.g.)	Stadium: Central Stadium; Attendance: 33,061; Referee: Néstor Pitana (Argentina)

===== Knock-out stage =====
3 July 2018 Round of 16	Sweden	1–0	Switzerland	Saint Petersburg, Russia
17:00 (UTC+3)	Forsberg 66'	Report (FIFA); Report		Stadium: Krestovsky Stadium; Attendance: 64,042; Referee: Damir Skomina (Slovenia)

7 July 2018 Quarter-finals	Sweden	0–2	England	Samara, Russia
18:00 (UTC+4)		Report (FIFA); Report	Maguire 30'; Alli 59'	Stadium: Cosmos Arena; Attendance: 39,991; Referee: Björn Kuipers (Netherlands)

==== 2018–19 UEFA Nations League ====
===== Group B2 =====
Pos	Team	Pld	W	D	L	GF	GA	GD	Pts	Promotion (Note: Due to revamp of the format for the 2020–21 UEFA Nations League, no teams were eventually relegated.)
1	Sweden (P)	4	2	1	1	5	3	+2	7 (Note: Head-to-head points: Sweden 4, Russia 1.)	Promotion to League A
2	Russia	4	2	1	1	4	3	+1	7	
3	Turkey	4	1	0	3	4	7	−3	3	

Source: UEFA
Rules for classification: Tiebreakers
(P) Promoted
Notes:

Win Draw Loss

10 September 2018 Group B2	Sweden	2–3	Turkey	Solna, Sweden
19:00 (UTC+2)	Kiese Thelin 35'; Claesson 49'	Report (UEFA); Report	Çalhanoğlu 51'; Akbaba 88', 90+2'	Stadium: Friends Arena; Attendance: 21,832; Referee: Jesús Gil Manzano (Spain)

11 October 2018 Group B2	Russia	0–0	Sweden	Kaliningrad, Russia
21:45 (UTC+2)		Report (UEFA); Report		Stadium: Kaliningrad Stadium; Attendance: 31,698; Referee: Luca Banti (Italy)

17 November 2018 Group B2	Turkey	0–1	Sweden	Konya, Turkey
20:00 (UTC+1)		Report (UEFA); Report	Granqvist 71' (pen.)	Stadium: Konya Büyükşehir Stadium; Attendance: 37,425; Referee: István Kovács (Romania)

20 November 2018 Group B2	Sweden	2–0	Russia	Solna, Sweden
20:45 (UTC+1)	Lindelöf 41'; Berg 72'	Report (UEFA); Report		Stadium: Friends Arena; Attendance: 20,223; Referee: Benoît Bastien (France)

==== Friendlies ====
Win Draw Loss

7 January 2018	Sweden	1–1	Estonia	Abu Dhabi, United Arab Emirates
21:15 (UTC+4)	Holmberg 79'	Report	Anier 58'	Stadium: Zayed Sports City Stadium; Attendance: 200; Referee: Antti Munukka (Finland)

11 January 2018	Sweden	1–0	Denmark	Abu Dhabi, United Arab Emirates
20:45 (UTC+4)	G. Nilsson 90+3'	Report		Stadium: Zayed Sports City Stadium; Referee: Antti Munukka (Finland)

24 March 2018	Sweden	1–2	Chile	Solna, Sweden
18:00 (UTC+1)	Toivonen 23'	Report	Vidal 22'; Bolados 90'	Stadium: Friends Arena; Attendance: 48,134; Referee: Anthony Taylor (England)

27 March 2018	Romania	1–0	Sweden	Craiova, Romania
20:30 (UTC+3)	Rotariu 57'	Report		Stadium: Stadionul Ion Oblemenco; Attendance: 20,000; Referee: Roi Reinshreiber (Israel)

2 June 2018	Sweden	0–0	Denmark	Solna, Sweden
19:45 (UTC+2)		Report		Stadium: Friends Arena; Attendance: 41,558; Referee: Tobias Stieler (Germany)

9 June 2018	Sweden	0–0	Peru	Gothenburg, Sweden
20:15 (UTC+2)		Report		Stadium: Nya Ullevi; Attendance: 32,163; Referee: Svein Oddvar Moen (Norway)

6 September 2018	Austria	2–0	Sweden	Vienna, Austria
20:45 (UTC+2)	Helander 11' (o.g.); Alaba 64'	Report		Stadium: Generali Arena; Attendance: 11,100; Referee: Pawel Gil (Poland)

16 October 2018	Sweden	1–1	Slovakia	Solna, Sweden
20:45 (UTC+2)	Guidetti 52'	Report	Rusnák 84'	Stadium: Friends Arena; Attendance: 9,876; Referee: Jakob Kehlet (Denmark)

==== Total results summary ====
Overall								Home						Away					
Pld	W	D	L	GF	GA	GD	Pts	W	D	L	GF	GA	GD	W	D	L	GF	GA	GD
16	5	5	6	13	14	−1	20	3	4	3	8	9	−1	2	1	3	5	5	0

Last updated: 17 November 2018.
Source: Svenskfotboll (in Swedish)

=== Sweden national under-21 football team ===
==== 2019 UEFA Euro Under-21 Championship qualification ====
Pos	Team	Pld	W	D	L	GF	GA	GD	Pts	Qualification
1	Belgium	10	8	2	0	23	5	+18	26	Final tournament
2	Sweden	10	6	2	2	19	8	+11	20	
3	Turkey	10	5	2	3	14	10	+4	17	
4	Hungary	10	3	2	5	12	14	−2	11	
5	Cyprus	10	2	1	7	8	23	−15	7	
6	Malta	10	1	1	8	8	24	−16	4	

Source: UEFA
Rules for classification: Qualification tiebreakers

Win Draw Loss

23 March 2018 2019 U21ECQ	Turkey	0–3	Sweden	Alanya, Turkey
17:00 (UTC+3)		Report (UEFA); Report	Asoro 7', 83'; Ingelsson 40'	Stadium: Bahçeşehir Okulları Stadium; Attendance: 810; Referee: Dennis Higler (Netherlands)

27 March 2018 2019 U21ECQ	Cyprus	0–1	Sweden	Larnaca, Cyprus
15:00 (UTC+3)		Report (UEFA); Report	Brorsson 90+7'	Stadium: AEK Arena; Attendance: 400; Referee: Fabio Verissimo (Portugal)

7 June 2018 2019 U21ECQ	Malta	0–4	Sweden	Ta' Qali, Malta
17:30 (UTC+2)		Report (UEFA); Report	Andersson 4'; Strandberg 31', 60'; Larsson 79' (pen.)	Stadium: Centenary Stadium; Attendance: 525; Referee: Peter Kjærsgaard-Andersen (Denmark)

7 September 2018 2019 U21ECQ	Sweden	1–0	Hungary	Falkenberg, Sweden
18:30 (UTC+2)	Svanberg 26'	Report (UEFA); Report		Stadium: Falcon Alkoholfri Arena; Attendance: 2,601; Referee: Kevin Clancy (Scotland)

11 September 2018 2019 U21ECQ	Sweden	0–1	Turkey	Helsingborg, Sweden
18:30 (UTC+2)		Report (UEFA); Report	Kanatsızkuş	Stadium: Olympia; Attendance: 3,112; Referee: Sergey Lapochkin (Russia)

16 October 2018 2019 U21ECQ	Sweden	0–3	Belgium	Kalmar, Sweden
18:30 (UTC+2)		Report (UEFA); Report	Dimata 29', 40'; Lukebakio 65'	Stadium: Guldfågeln Arena; Attendance: 6,118; Referee: Frank Schneider (France)

==== Total results summary ====
Overall								Home						Away					
Pld	W	D	L	GF	GA	GD	Pts	W	D	L	GF	GA	GD	W	D	L	GF	GA	GD
6	4	0	2	9	4	+5	12	1	0	2	1	4	−3	3	0	0	8	0	+8

Last updated: 16 October 2018.
Source: Svenskfotboll (in Swedish)

=== Sweden men's national under-19 football team ===
==== 2018 UEFA European Under-19 Championship qualification ====
Pos	Team	Pld	W	D	L	GF	GA	GD	Pts	Qualification
1	Ukraine (Q)	3	2	1	0	4	2	+2	7	Final tournament
2	Romania (H)	3	2	0	1	7	3	+4	6	
3	Serbia	3	1	0	2	4	8	−4	3	
4	Sweden	3	0	1	2	3	5	−2	1	

Updated to match(es) played on 24 March 2018. Source: UEFA
Rules for classification: Qualification tiebreakers
(H) Hosts; (Q) Qualified for the phase indicated

Win Draw Loss

21 March 2018 2018 U19ECQ	Sweden	0–0	Ukraine	Ploiești, Romania
16:00 (UTC+2)		Report		Stadium: Stadionul Ilie Oană; Referee: Alan Mario Sant (Malta)

24 March 2018 2018 U19ECQ	Romania	2–1	Sweden	Mogoșoaia, Romania
20:00 (UTC+2)	Băluță 33'; Măţan 58'	Report	Browning 4'	Stadium: Stadionul Mogoșoaia; Referee: Alejandro Hernandez (Spain)

27 March 2018 2018 U19ECQ	Serbia	3–2	Sweden	Buftea, Romania
15:00 (UTC+3)	Petrović 17'; Stanojev 19'; Joveljić 80'	Report	Mumbongo 64'; Kulusevski 89'	Stadium: Stadionul CNAF; Referee: Alan Mario Sant (Malta)

==== 2019 UEFA European Under-19 Championship qualification ====
Pos	Team	Pld	W	D	L	GF	GA	GD	Pts	Qualification
1	Scotland	3	2	1	0	9	3	+6	7	Elite round
2	Wales (H)	3	2	0	1	5	3	+2	6	Elite round
3	Sweden	3	1	1	1	5	5	0	4	
4	San Marino	3	0	0	3	1	9	−8	0	

Source: UEFA
Rules for classification: Qualification tiebreakers
(H) Hosts

14 November 2018 2019 U19ECQ	Sweden	2–1	San Marino	Bangor, Wales
17:00 (UTC+1)	Mbunga-Kimpioka 54'; Moretti 60' (o.g.)	Report	Moretti 67'	Stadium: Nantporth; Referee: Alexandr Aliyev (Kazakhstan)

17 November 2018 2019 U19ECQ	Sweden	1–2	Wales	Rhyl, Wales
16:00 (UTC+1)	Mbunga-Kimpioka 31'	Report	Adams 13'; Norton 63'	Stadium: Belle Vue; Referee: Alexandr Aliyev (Kazakhstan)

20 November 2018 2019 U19ECQ	Scotland	2–2	Sweden	Rhyl, Wales
16:00 (UTC+1)	Gilmour 20' (pen.); Watt 83'	Report	Ousou 71'; Vagić 73'	Stadium: Belle Vue; Referee: Juri Frischer (Estonia)

==== Total results summary ====
Overall								Home						Away					
Pld	W	D	L	GF	GA	GD	Pts	W	D	L	GF	GA	GD	W	D	L	GF	GA	GD
6	1	2	3	8	10	−2	5	1	1	1	3	3	0	0	1	2	5	7	−2

Last updated: 1 January 2019.
Source: Svenskfotboll (in Swedish)

=== Sweden men's national under-17 football team ===
==== 2018 UEFA European Under-17 Championship qualification ====
Pos	Team	Pld	W	D	L	GF	GA	GD	Pts	Qualification
1	Sweden (Q)	3	1	2	0	1	0	+1	5	Final tournament
2	Belgium	3	1	1	1	3	3	0	4	Final tournament if among seven best runners-up
3	Cyprus	3	0	3	0	2	2	0	3	
4	Croatia (H)	3	0	2	1	2	3	−1	2	

Source: UEFA
Rules for classification: Qualification tiebreakers
(H) Hosts; (Q) Qualified for the phase indicated

Win Draw Loss

9 March 2018 2018 U17ECQ	Sweden	0–0	Croatia	Pula, Croatia
15:30 (UTC+1)		Report		Stadium: Stadion Aldo Drosina; Referee: Christopher Jaeger (Austria)

12 March 2018 2018 U17ECQ	Belgium	0–1	Sweden	Pula, Croatia
12:00 (UTC+1)		Report	Larsson 67'	Stadium: Stadion Aldo Drosina; Referee: Nejc Kajtazović (Slovenia)

15 March 2018 2018 U17ECQ	Cyprus	0–0	Sweden	Kostrena, Croatia
15:30 (UTC+1)		Report		Stadium: Stadion Žuknica; Referee: Eldorjan Hamiti (Albania)

==== 2018 UEFA European Under-17 Championship ====
===== Group stage =====
Pos	Team	Pld	W	D	L	GF	GA	GD	Pts	Qualification
1	Norway	3	2	1	0	4	1	+3	7	Knockout stage
2	Sweden	3	2	0	1	4	2	+2	6	Knockout stage
3	Portugal	3	1	1	1	4	1	+3	4	
4	Slovenia	3	0	0	3	0	8	−8	0	

Updated to match(es) played on 10 May 2018. Source: UEFA
Rules for classification: Qualification tiebreakers

Win Draw Loss

4 May 2018 Group A	Slovenia	0–2	Sweden	Burton upon Trent, England
19:00 (UTC+1)		Report (UEFA); Report	Hammar 7'; Nygren 23'	Stadium: St George's Park; Attendance: 338; Referee: Robert Harvey (Republic of Ireland)

7 May 2018 Group A	Norway	2–1	Sweden	Burton upon Trent, England
12:30 (UTC+1)	Rekdal 39', 69'	Report (UEFA); Report	Hammar 4'	Stadium: Pirelli Stadium; Attendance: 454; Referee: Horatiu Fesnic (Romania)

10 May 2018 Group A	Sweden	1–0	Portugal	Burton upon Trent, England
13:00 (UTC+1)	Wikström 16'	Report (UEFA); Report		Stadium: Pirelli Stadium; Attendance: 953; Referee: Juri Frischer (Estonia)

===== Knock-out stage =====
13 May 2018 Quarter-finals	Italy	1–0	Sweden	Rotherham, England
15:00 (UTC+1)	Vergani 4'	Report (UEFA); Report		Stadium: New York Stadium; Attendance: 1,061; Referee: Dennis Higler (Netherlands)

==== Total results summary ====
Overall								Home						Away					
Pld	W	D	L	GF	GA	GD	Pts	W	D	L	GF	GA	GD	W	D	L	GF	GA	GD
7	3	2	2	5	3	+2	11	1	1	0	1	0	+1	2	1	2	4	3	+1

Last updated: 28 May 2018.
Source: Svenskfotboll (in Swedish)

=== Sweden women's national football team ===
==== 2019 FIFA Women's World Cup qualification ====
Pos	Team	Pld	W	D	L	GF	GA	GD	Pts	Qualification
1	Sweden	8	7	0	1	22	2	+20	21	2019 FIFA Women's World Cup
2	Denmark	8	5	1	2	22	8	+14	16	Play-offs
3	Ukraine	8	4	1	3	9	10	−1	13	
4	Hungary	8	1	1	6	8	26	−18	4	
5	Croatia	8	0	3	5	5	20	−15	3	

Source: UEFA
Rules for classification: Qualification tiebreakers

Win Draw Loss

5 April 2018 2019 WCQ	Hungary	1–4	Sweden	Szombathely, Hungary
18:00 (UTC+2)	Vágó 63'	Report	Seger 17'; Jakobsson 25'; Blackstenius 87'; Larsson 90+3'	Stadium: Haladás Sportkomplexum; Attendance: 872; Referee: Viola Raudziņa (Latvia)

7 June 2018 2019 WCQ	Sweden	4–0	Croatia	Gothenburg, Sweden
18:45 (UTC+2)	Blackstenius 16', 67'; Rubensson 63'; Folkesson 90'	Report		Stadium: Gamla Ullevi; Attendance: 8,092; Referee: Marta Frías Acedo (Spain)

12 June 2018 2019 WCQ	Ukraine	1–0	Sweden	Lviv, Ukraine
19:00 (UTC+3)	Apanaschenko 41'	Report		Stadium: Arena Lviv; Attendance: 1,257; Referee: Petra Pavlíková (Slovakia)

30 August 2018 2019 WCQ	Sweden	3–0	Ukraine	Gothenburg, Sweden
18:45 (UTC+2)	Rubensson 34'; Eriksson 38'; Asllani 51'	Report		Stadium: Gamla Ullevi; Attendance: 6,175; Referee: Monika Mularczyk (Poland)

4 September 2018 2019 WCQ	Denmark	0–1	Sweden	Viborg, Denmark
17:00 (UTC+2)		Report	Jakobsson 46'	Stadium: Energi Viborg Arena; Attendance: 8,182; Referee: Anastasia Pustovoitova (Russia)

==== 2018 Algarve Cup ====
===== Group stage =====
Pos	Team	Pld	W	D	L	GF	GA	GD	Pts
1	Sweden	3	2	1	0	7	2	+5	7
2	Canada	3	2	0	1	5	3	+2	6
3	South Korea	3	1	1	1	4	5	−1	4
4	Russia	3	0	0	3	1	7	−6	0

Updated to match(es) played on 5 March 2018. Source: Svenska Fotbollförbundet (in Swedish)
Rules for classification: Goal difference

Win Draw Loss

28 February 2018	Canada	1–3	Sweden	Parchal, Portugal
19:00 (UTC±0)	Beckie 46'	Report	Larsson 43'; Rolfö 51'; Blackstenius 87'	Stadium: Estádio Municipal da Bela Vista; Attendance: 205; Referee: Lidya Tafesse Abebe (Ethiopia)

2 March 2018	Sweden	1–1	South Korea	Parchal, Portugal
19:00 (UTC±0)	Blackstenius 19'	Report	Mi-na 33'	Stadium: Estádio Municipal da Bela Vista; Referee: Salima Mukansanga (Rwanda)

5 March 2018	Sweden	3–0	Russia	Lagos, Portugal
15:00 (UTC±0)	Angeldal 31'; Rolfö 50', 61'	Report		Stadium: Estádio Municipal de Lagos; Referee: Marianela Araya Cruz (Costa Rica)

===== Final =====
7 March 2018	Netherlands	Cancelled	Sweden	Parchal, Portugal
18:30 (UTC±0)				Stadium: Estádio Municipal da Bela Vista; Referee: Anastasia Pustovoytova (Russia)

- The final game was called off due to heavy rain and adverse weather conditions, and both teams were awarded first place.

==== Friendlies ====
Win Draw Loss

21 January 2018	South Africa	0–3	Sweden	Cape Town, South Africa
13:00 (UTC+2)		Report	Mbane 10' (o.g.); Kullashi 47', 69'	Stadium: Green Point Stadium; Attendance: 6,677; Referee: Nteboheleng Setoko (South Africa)

4 October 2018	Sweden	2–1	Norway	Helsingborg, Sweden
18:45 (UTC+2)	Schough 13'; Bjørdal Leine 32' (o.g.)	Report	Herlovsen 85'	Stadium: Olympia; Attendance: 2,639; Referee: Katalin Kulcsár (Hungary)

9 October 2018	Italy	1–0	Sweden	Cremona, Italy
18:15 (UTC+2)	Sabatino 57'	Report		Stadium: Stadio Giovanni Zini; Attendance: 2,000; Referee: Tanja Subotič (Slovenia)

11 November 2018	England	0–2	Sweden	Rotherham, England
13:30 (UTC)		Report	Jakobsson 20'; Anvegård 33'	Stadium: New York Stadium; Attendance: 9,561; Referee: Petra Pavliková (Slovakia)

==== Total results summary ====
Overall								Home						Away					
Pld	W	D	L	GF	GA	GD	Pts	W	D	L	GF	GA	GD	W	D	L	GF	GA	GD
12	9	1	2	26	6	+20	28	4	1	0	13	2	+11	5	0	2	13	4	+9

Last updated: 13 November 2018.
Source: Svenskfotboll (in Swedish)
