= 2019 FIFA Women's World Cup qualification – UEFA Group 7 =

Football tournament qualification stage

UEFA Group 7 of the 2019 FIFA Women's World Cup qualification competition consisted of five teams: Spain, Austria, Finland, Serbia, and Israel (which advanced from the preliminary round). The composition of the seven groups in the qualifying group stage was decided by the draw held on 25 April 2017, with the teams seeded according to their coefficient ranking.

The group was played in home-and-away round-robin format between 19 September 2017 and 4 September 2018. The group winners qualified for the final tournament, while the runners-up advanced to the play-offs if they were one of the four best runners-up among all seven groups (not counting results against the fifth-placed team).

== Standings ==
Pos	Team	Pld	W	D	L	GF	GA	GD	Pts	Qualification	Spain	Austria	Finland	Serbia	Israel
1	Spain	8	8	0	0	25	2	+23	24	2019 FIFA Women's World Cup	—	4–0	5–1	3–0	2–0
2	Austria	8	5	1	2	19	7	+12	16		0–1	—	4–1	1–1	2–0
3	Finland	8	3	1	4	9	13	−4	10		0–2	0–2	—	1–0	4–0
4	Serbia	8	2	1	5	5	13	−8	7		1–2	0–4	0–2	—	2–0
5	Israel	8	0	1	7	0	23	−23	1		0–6	0–6	0–0	0–1	—

Source: UEFA
Rules for classification: Qualification tiebreakers

== Matches ==
Times are CET/CEST, (Note: CEST (UTC+2) for dates between 26 March and 28 October 2017 and between 25 March and 27 October 2018, and CET (UTC+1) for all other dates.) as listed by UEFA (local times, if different, are in parentheses).

19 September 2017
20:00

Serbia	0–4	Austria
	Report	Burger 15', 37', 90+2'; Billa 18'

Mladost Stadium, Kruševac
Attendance: 1,270
Referee: Sandra Bastos (Portugal)

19 October 2017
15:30

Serbia	2–0	Israel
Filipović 8'; Damjanović 13'	Report

Čukarički Stadium, Belgrade
Attendance: 200
Referee: Lucie Šulcová (Czech Republic)

22 October 2017
16:00 (17:00 EEST)

Finland	1–0	Serbia
Tenkov 79' (o.g.)	Report

Telia 5G -areena, Helsinki
Attendance: 1,679
Referee: Carina Vitulano (Italy)
23 October 2017
16:00 (17:00 IDT)

Israel	0–6	Spain
	Report	Paredes 37', 57'; Hermoso 43', 84'; Latorre 73'; Sampedro 90+1'

Ramat Gan Stadium, Ramat Gan
Attendance: 210
Referee: Zuzana Kováčová (Slovakia)

23 November 2017
20:30

Austria	2–0	Israel
Puntigam 12'; Burger 57'	Report

Bundesstadion Südstadt, Maria Enzersdorf
Attendance: 3,100
Referee: Amy Fearn (England)
24 November 2017
16:30

Serbia	1–2	Spain
Damjanović 78'	Report	Hermoso 13'; Guijarro 90+1'

Voždovac Stadium, Belgrade
Attendance: 200
Referee: Marte Sørø (Norway)

26 November 2017
13:00 (14:00 EET)

Finland	4–0	Israel
Collin 40'; Sällström 43', 55'; Alanen 52'	Report

Telia 5G -areena, Helsinki
Attendance: 1,215
Referee: Meliz Özçiğdem (Turkey)
28 November 2017
20:15

Spain	4–0	Austria
Putellas 3'; Guijarro 16'; Paredes 43'; Torrecilla 57'	Report

Son Moix, Palma
Attendance: 2,371
Referee: Kateryna Monzul (Ukraine)

22 January 2018
16:00 (17:00 IST)

Israel	0–0	Finland
	Report

Ramat Gan Stadium, Ramat Gan
Attendance: 200
Referee: Karoline Wacker (Germany)

5 April 2018
19:00

Austria	1–1	Serbia
Lazarević 32' (o.g.)	Report	Radojičić 5'

Bundesstadion Südstadt, Maria Enzersdorf
Attendance: 2,100
Referee: Sandra Bastos (Portugal)
6 April 2018
17:05 (18:05 EEST)

Finland	0–2	Spain
	Report	Paredes 11'; O. García 50'

Telia 5G -areena, Helsinki
Attendance: 3,331
Referee: Florence Guillemin (France)

10 April 2018
16:00 (17:00 IDT)

Israel	0–1	Serbia
	Report	Stanković 65'

Ramat Gan Stadium, Ramat Gan
Attendance: 150
Referee: Araksya Saribekyan (Armenia)
10 April 2018
20:30

Austria	0–1	Spain
	Report	Hermoso 59'

Bundesstadion Südstadt, Maria Enzersdorf
Attendance: 2,950
Referee: Anastasia Pustovoitova (Russia)

7 June 2018
20:30

Spain	2–0	Israel
Vilas 51'; Putellas 88' (pen.)	Report

La Condomina, Murcia
Attendance: 3,368
Referee: Iuliana Demetrescu (Romania)
8 June 2018
17:00 (18:00 EEST)

Finland	0–2	Austria
	Report	Koivisto 6' (o.g.); Schiechtl 72'

Telia 5G -areena, Helsinki
Attendance: 4,130
Referee: Ivana Martinčić (Croatia)

12 June 2018
18:00

Serbia	0–2	Finland
	Report	Hyyrynen 17'; Kostić 82' (o.g.)

Zemun Stadium, Zemun
Attendance: 307
Referee: Henrikke Nervik (Norway)
12 June 2018
18:30 (19:30 IDT)

Israel	0–6	Austria
	Report	Schiechtl 5'; Wenninger 19'; Billa 49'; Puntigam 56' (pen.); Aschauer 69'; Feiersinger 88'

Ramat Gan Stadium, Ramat Gan
Attendance: 175
Referee: Eszter Urbán (Hungary)

31 August 2018
19:00

Spain	5–1	Finland
Corredera 28', 45'; Hermoso 38'; Meriluoto 65' (o.g.); N. García 69'	Report	Sällström 33'

El Sardinero, Santander
Attendance: 7,593
Referee: Désirée Grundbacher (Switzerland)

4 September 2018
17:00

Austria	4–1	Finland
Billa 13', 68'; Zadrazil 34'; Pinther 49'	Report	Sällström 45'

Stadion Wiener Neustadt, Wiener Neustadt
Attendance: 1,800
Referee: Sandra Bastos (Portugal)
4 September 2018
20:30

Spain	3–0	Serbia
Hermoso 3' (pen.), 75'; Sampedro 35'	Report

Las Gaunas, Logroño
Attendance: 7,727
Referee: Vesna Budimir (Croatia)

== Goalscorers ==
There were 58 goals scored in 20 matches, for an average of 2.9 goals per match.

7 goals

- (Spain) Jennifer Hermoso

4 goals

- (Austria) Nicole Billa
- (Austria) Nina Burger
- (Finland) Linda Sällström
- (Spain) Irene Paredes

2 goals

- (Austria) Sarah Puntigam
- (Austria) Katharina Schiechtl
- (Serbia) Nevena Damjanović
- (Spain) Marta Corredera
- (Spain) Patricia Guijarro
- (Spain) Alexia Putellas
- (Spain) Amanda Sampedro

1 goal

- (Austria) Verena Aschauer
- (Austria) Laura Feiersinger
- (Austria) Viktoria Pinther
- (Austria) Carina Wenninger
- (Austria) Sarah Zadrazil
- (Finland) Emmi Alanen
- (Finland) Kaisa Collin
- (Finland) Tuija Hyyrynen
- (Serbia) Tijana Filipović
- (Serbia) Marija Radojičić
- (Serbia) Milica Stanković
- (Spain) Nahikari García
- (Spain) Olga García
- (Spain) Bárbara Latorre
- (Spain) Virginia Torrecilla
- (Spain) Mari Paz Vilas

1 own goal

- (Finland) Emma Koivisto (against Austria)
- (Finland) Minna Meriluoto (against Spain)
- (Serbia) Milica Kostić (against Finland)
- (Serbia) Aleksandra Lazarević (against Austria)
- (Serbia) Mirela Tenkov (against Finland)
