= 2019 FIFA Women's World Cup qualification – UEFA Group 4 =

Football tournament qualification stage

UEFA Group 4 of the 2019 FIFA Women's World Cup qualification competition consisted of five teams: Sweden, Denmark, Ukraine, Hungary, and Croatia. The composition of the seven groups in the qualifying group stage was decided by the draw held on 25 April 2017, with the teams seeded according to their coefficient ranking.

The group was played in home-and-away round-robin format between 15 September 2017 and 4 September 2018. The group winners qualified for the final tournament, while the runners-up advanced to the play-offs if they were one of the four best runners-up among all seven groups (not counting results against the fifth-placed team).

== Standings ==
Pos	Team	Pld	W	D	L	GF	GA	GD	Pts	Qualification	Sweden	Denmark	Ukraine	Hungary	Croatia
1	Sweden	8	7	0	1	22	2	+20	21	2019 FIFA Women's World Cup	—	3–0 (Note: The Sweden v Denmark match was scheduled for 20 October 2017, but was cancelled because of a disagreement between the Danish team and their federation. On 16 November it was announced that the result was awarded 3–0 to Sweden.)	3–0	5–0	4–0
2	Denmark	8	5	1	2	22	8	+14	16	Play-offs	0–1	—	1–0	5–1	1–1
3	Ukraine	8	4	1	3	9	10	−1	13		1–0	1–5	—	2–0	1–1
4	Hungary	8	1	1	6	8	26	−18	4		1–4	1–6	0–1	—	2–2
5	Croatia	8	0	3	5	5	20	−15	3		0–2	0–4	0–3	1–3	—

Source: UEFA
Rules for classification: Qualification tiebreakers

== Matches ==
Times are CET/CEST, (Note: CEST (UTC+2) for dates between 26 March and 28 October 2017 and between 25 March and 27 October 2018, and CET (UTC+1) for all other dates.) as listed by UEFA (local times, if different, are in parentheses).

15 September 2017
18:00 (19:00 EEST)

Ukraine	1–1	Croatia
Apanashchenko 75' (pen.)	Report	Rudelic 90+1'

Arena Lviv, Lviv
Attendance: 1,342
Referee: Florence Guillemin (France)

19 September 2017
18:00

Hungary	1–6	Denmark
Jakabfi 41' (pen.)	Report	Nadim 28' (pen.); Troelsgaard 44', 67', 74'; Harder 55'; Sørensen 88'

Ménfői úti Stadion, Győr
Attendance: 300
Referee: Ewa Augustyn (Poland)
19 September 2017
18:00

Croatia	0–2	Sweden
	Report	Hurtig 62'; Asllani 90+2'

Stadion Varteks, Varaždin
Attendance: 452
Referee: Eleni Lampadariou (Greece)

19 October 2017
15:30

Hungary	2–2	Croatia
Csiszár 75', 90+4'	Report	Žigić 79'; Dujmenović 90+1'

Ménfői úti Stadion, Győr
Attendance: 250
Referee: Shona Shukrula (Netherlands)
20 October 2017
18:15

Sweden	3–0 Awarded (Note: The Sweden v Denmark match was scheduled for 20 October 2017, 18:15 local time, at Gamla Ullevi, Gothenburg, but was cancelled by Denmark because of a pay dispute between the Danish team and their federation. UEFA opened disciplinary proceedings against Denmark for refusal to play and, on 16 November, it was announced that UEFA awarded the match to Sweden by a score of 3–0, and fined Denmark €20,000.)	Denmark
	Report

Gamla Ullevi, Gothenburg

24 October 2017
18:00

Croatia	0–4	Denmark
	Report	Harder 7', 27'; Christiansen 89'; Bruun 90+4'

Stadion ŠRC Zaprešić, Zaprešić
Attendance: 400
Referee: Lorraine Clark Scotland
24 October 2017
18:45

Sweden	5–0	Hungary
Hurtig 14'; Fischer 20'; Asllani 42', 50'; Seger 43'	Report

Borås Arena, Borås
Attendance: 5,563
Referee: Meliz Özçiğdem (Turkey)

24 November 2017
15:00

Hungary	0–1	Ukraine
	Report	Apanashchenko 90+4'

Balmazújvárosi Városi Sportpálya, Balmazújváros
Attendance: 500
Referee: Paula Brady (Ireland)

5 April 2018
17:00

Croatia	0–3	Ukraine
	Report	Bošnjak 25' (o.g.); Kozyrenko 41', 45+3'

Stadion Stanovi, Zadar
Attendance: 500
Referee: Marte Sørø (Norway)
5 April 2018
18:00

Hungary	1–4	Sweden
Vágó 63'	Report	Seger 17'; Jakobsson 25'; Blackstenius 87'; Larsson 90+3'

Haladás Sportkomplexum, Szombathely
Attendance: 872
Referee: Viola Raudziņa (Latvia)

9 April 2018
17:00

Croatia	1–3	Hungary
Žigić 90+4'	Report	Vágó 43', 84'; Jakabfi 72'

Stadion Stanovi, Zadar
Attendance: 500
Referee: Cheryl Foster (Wales)
9 April 2018
18:00

Denmark	1–0	Ukraine
Troelsgaard 78'	Report

Viborg Stadium, Viborg
Attendance: 5,471
Referee: Jana Adámková (Czech Republic)

7 June 2018
18:45

Sweden	4–0	Croatia
Blackstenius 16', 67'; Rubensson 63'; Folkesson 90'	Report

Gamla Ullevi, Gothenburg
Attendance: 8,092
Referee: Marta Frias Acedo (Spain)
8 June 2018
18:00 (19:00 EEST)

Ukraine	1–5	Denmark
Ovdiychuk 90+3'	Report	Nadim 6', 52' (pen.); Harder 33'; Troelsgaard 81', 90+4'

Arena Lviv, Lviv
Attendance: 1,800
Referee: Carina Vitulano (Italy)

12 June 2018
18:00

Denmark	5–1	Hungary
Nadim 44', 45+1'; Boye 47'; Nielsen 57'; Harder 90+4'	Report	Jakabfi 24'

Viborg Stadium, Viborg
Attendance: 7,028
Referee: Rebecca Welch (England)
12 June 2018
18:00 (19:00 EEST)

Ukraine	1–0	Sweden
Apanashchenko 41'	Report

Arena Lviv, Lviv
Attendance: 1,257
Referee: Petra Pavlíková (Slovakia)

30 August 2018
18:45

Sweden	3–0	Ukraine
Rubensson 34'; Eriksson 38'; Asllani 51'	Report

Gamla Ullevi, Gothenburg
Attendance: 6,171
Referee: Monika Mularczyk (Poland)
30 August 2018
19:00

Denmark	1–1	Croatia
Nadim 90+2'	Report	Lojna 60'

Viborg Stadium, Viborg
Attendance: 7,045
Referee: Volha Tsiareshka (Belarus)

4 September 2018
17:00

Denmark	0–1	Sweden
	Report	Jakobsson 46'

Viborg Stadium, Viborg
Attendance: 8,182
Referee: Anastasia Pustovoitova (Russia)
4 September 2018
17:00 (18:00 EEST)

Ukraine	2–0	Hungary
Kravets 26'; Apanashchenko 31'	Report

Ternopilsky Misky Stadion, Ternopil
Attendance: 6,400
Referee: Graziella Pirriatore (Italy)

== Goalscorers ==
There were 63 goals scored in 19 matches, for an average of 3.32 goals per match.

Only matches effectively played (excludes awarded results).

6 goals

- (Denmark) Nadia Nadim
- (Denmark) Sanne Troelsgaard Nielsen

5 goals

- (Denmark) Pernille Harder

4 goals

- (Sweden) Kosovare Asllani
- (Ukraine) Daryna Apanashchenko

3 goals

- (Hungary) Zsanett Jakabfi
- (Hungary) Fanny Vágó
- (Sweden) Stina Blackstenius

2 goals

- (Croatia) Sandra Žigić
- (Hungary) Henrietta Csiszár
- (Sweden) Lina Hurtig
- (Sweden) Sofia Jakobsson
- (Sweden) Elin Rubensson
- (Sweden) Caroline Seger
- (Ukraine) Tetyana Kozyrenko

1 goal

- (Croatia) Isabella Dujmenović
- (Croatia) Izabela Lojna
- (Croatia) Ivana Rudelic
- (Denmark) Simone Boye Sørensen
- (Denmark) Signe Bruun
- (Denmark) Nanna Christiansen
- (Denmark) Theresa Nielsen
- (Denmark) Nicoline Sørensen
- (Sweden) Magdalena Eriksson
- (Sweden) Nilla Fischer
- (Sweden) Hanna Folkesson
- (Sweden) Mimmi Larsson
- (Ukraine) Darya Kravets
- (Ukraine) Olha Ovdiychuk

1 own goal

- (Croatia) Matea Bošnjak (against Ukraine)
