= Eliana Stábile =

Argentine footballer

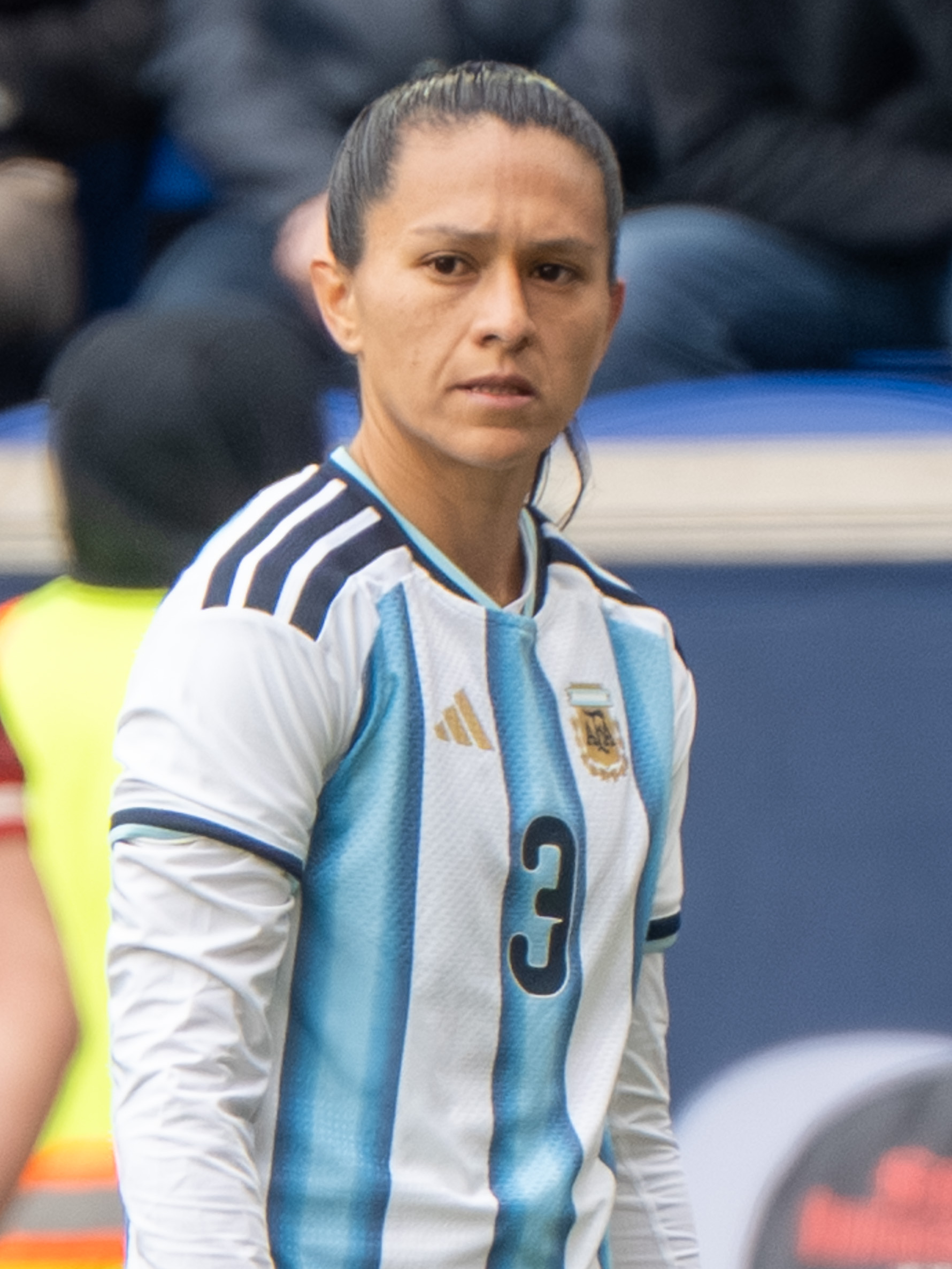
- Stábile with Argentina in 2026

Personal information
- Full name: Eliana Noemí Stábile
- Date of birth: 26 November 1993 (age 32)
- Place of birth: Merlo, Buenos Aires, Argentina
- Height: 1.67 m (5 ft 6 in)
- Position: Left-back

Team information
- Current team: Gimnasia y Esgrima (LP)
- Number: 6

Senior career*
Years	Team	Apps	(Gls)
2007–2013	River Plate		
2014–2018	Boca Juniors		
2018	Atlético Huila		
2019–2021	Boca Juniors		
2022–2023	Santos	18	(0)
2023–2025	Boca Juniors		
2026–	Gimnasia y Esgrima (LP)		

International career^{‡}
2017–	Argentina	84	(6)
Medal record
Women's football
Representing Argentina
Copa América Femenina
Third place	2018 Chile
Third place	2022 Colombia
Third place	2025 Ecuador
Pan American Games
Silver medal – second place	2019 Lima	Team
- * Club domestic league appearances and goals as of 15:34, 4 August 2023 (UTC) ‡ National team caps and goals as of 11:05, 18 April 2026 (UTC)

Eliana Noemí Stábile (born 26 November 1993) is an Argentine professional footballer who plays as a left-back for Gimnasia y Esgrima (LP) and the Argentina women's national team. She is related to Argentinian football legend Guillermo Stábile.

== Club career ==
Born in Buenos Aires, Stábile played for River Plate and Boca Juniors in her home country before moving to Colombian side Atlético Huila for the 2018 Copa Libertadores Femenina. Ahead of the 2019 season, she returned to Boca.

On 4 February 2022, Stábile joined Brazilian side Santos. On 21 July 2023, she and her compatriot Adriana Sachs were released by the club. On 12 August 2023, Boca announced the return of Stábile.

== International career ==
Stábile represented Argentina at the 2018 Copa América Femenina and helped the team to qualify for the 2019 FIFA Women's World Cup by scoring two goals against Panama during the CONCACAF–CONMEBOL play-off.

== Career statistics ==
=== International ===
As of match played 14 April 2026

Appearances and goals by national team and year
National team	Year	Apps	Goals
Argentina	2017	1	0
Argentina	2018	10	2
Argentina	2019	16	0
Argentina	2021	7	0
Argentina	2022	13	2
Argentina	2023	14	2
Argentina	2024	5	0
Argentina	2025	13	0
Argentina	2026	5	0
Total		84	6

=== International goals ===
Scores and results list Argentina's goal tally first

No.	Date	Venue	Opponent	Score	Result	Competition
1.	18 November 2018	Estadio Julio Humberto Grondona, Sarandí, Argentina	Panama	2–0	4–0	2019 FIFA Women's World Cup qualification (CONCACAF–CONMEBOL play-off)
2.	18 November 2018	Estadio Julio Humberto Grondona, Sarandí, Argentina	Panama	4–0	4–0	2019 FIFA Women's World Cup qualification (CONCACAF–CONMEBOL play-off)
3.	12 July 2022	Estadio Centenario, Armenia, Colombia	Peru	3–0	4–0	2022 Copa América
4.	15 July 2022	Estadio Centenario, Armenia, Colombia	Uruguay	5–0	5–0	2022 Copa América
5.	17 February 2023	North Harbour Stadium, Auckland, New Zealand	Chile	1–0	4–0	Friendly
6.	25 October 2023	Estadio Elías Figueroa Brander, Valparaíso, Chile	Bolivia	2–0	3–0	2023 Pan American Games

== Honours ==
River Plate

- Primera División A: 2009 Clausura, 2010 Clausura

Boca Juniors

- Supercopa Argentina: 2015
- Primera División A: 2020, 2021
- Súper Final: 2021
- Copa de la Liga: 2023
- Copa Federal: 2023

Atlético Huila

- Copa Libertadores Femenina: 2018
