= Sonja Čevnik =

Slovenian footballer

Personal information
- Date of birth: 12 December 1990 (age 35)
- Position: Goalkeeper

International career^{‡}
Years	Team	Apps	(Gls)
- Slovenia
- ‡ National team caps and goals as of 19:50, 30 August 2019 (UTC)

Sonja Čevnik (born 12 December 1990) is a Slovenian footballer who plays as a goalkeeper and has appeared for the Slovenia women's national team.

== Career ==
Čevnik has been capped for the Slovenia national team, appearing for the team during the 2019 FIFA Women's World Cup qualifying cycle.
