= Maria Galay =

Russian footballer (born 1992)

Personal information
- Full name: Maria Igorevna Galay
- Date of birth: 14 October 1992 (age 34)
- Place of birth: Omsk, Russia
- Height: 1.61 m (5 ft 3 1/2 in)
- Position: Defender

Team information
- Current team: Dynamo Moscow
- Number: 79

Senior career*
Years	Team	Apps	(Gls)
2012–2018	Zvezda Perm	62	(6)
2019–2020	FC Minsk	40	(3)
2021–2023	Lokomotiv Moscow	68	(3)
2024–	Dynamo Moscow	31	(2)

International career^{‡}
2018–	Russia	6	(1)
- * Club domestic league appearances and goals as of 20 May 2025 ‡ National team caps and goals as of 02:30, 25 November 2019 (UTC)

Maria Igorevna Galay (Russian: Мария Игоревна Галай; born 14 October 1992) is a Russian footballer who plays as a defender for Dynamo Moscow in the Russian Women's Football Championship and has appeared for the Russia women's national team.

== Career ==
Galay has been capped for the Russia national team, appearing for the team during the 2019 FIFA Women's World Cup qualifying cycle.

== International goals ==
No.	Date	Venue	Opponent	Score	Result	Competition
1.	5 April 2018	Bosnia and Herzegovina FA Training Centre, Zenica, Bosnia & Herzegovina	Bosnia and Herzegovina	2–1	6–1	2019 FIFA Women's World Cup qualifying
