= Matea Bošnjak =

Croatian footballer

Personal information
- Date of birth: 21 December 1997 (age 28)
- Place of birth: Laichingen, Germany
- Position: Defender

Team information
- Current team: Hajduk
- Number: 22

Youth career
- 2001–2013: TSV Laichingen
- 2013–2014: FV Asch-Sonderbuch 2000
- 2014–2015: Alberweiler
- 2015: Sindelfingen

Senior career*
Years	Team	Apps	(Gls)
2014–2015	Alberweiler	17	(15)
2015–2017	Sindelfingen	38	(7)
2017–2018	Bayer Leverkusen	15	(3)
2019–2026	Split	98	(51)
2026–	Hajduk	0	(0)

International career
2016–2022	Croatia	33	(2)
- * Club domestic league appearances and goals

Matea Bošnjak (born 21 December 1997) is a Croatian footballer who plays as a defender for ŽNK Hajduk and has appeared for the Croatia women's national team, despite being born in Germany.

== Career ==
Bošnjak has been capped for the Croatia national team, appearing for the team during the 2019 FIFA Women's World Cup qualifying cycle.
