= Isabella Dujmenović =

Croatian footballer (born 1995)

Personal information
- Date of birth: 16 July 1995 (age 31)
- Position: Defender

International career^{‡}
| Years | Team | Apps | (Gls) |
- Croatia
- ‡ National team caps and goals as of 19:28, 30 August 2019 (UTC)

Isabella Dujmenović, born on 16 July 1995, is a Croatian footballer who plays as a defender and has represented the Croatia women's national team.

== Career ==
Dujmenović has earned caps for the Croatia national team, participating in matches during the 2019 FIFA Women's World Cup qualifying cycle. Since the 2022/2023 season, she has been playing for FCM Traiskirchen.
