= 2019 FIFA Women's World Cup qualification – UEFA Group 1 =

Football tournament qualification stage

UEFA Group 1 of the 2019 FIFA Women's World Cup qualification competition consisted of five teams: England, Russia, Wales, Bosnia and Herzegovina, and Kazakhstan (which advanced from the preliminary round). The composition of the seven groups in the qualifying group stage was decided by the draw held on 25 April 2017, with the teams seeded according to their coefficient ranking.

The group was played in home-and-away round-robin format between 17 September 2017 and 4 September 2018. The group winners qualified for the final tournament, while the runners-up advanced to the play-offs if they were one of the four best runners-up among all seven groups (not counting results against the fifth-placed team).

== Standings ==
Pos	Team	Pld	W	D	L	GF	GA	GD	Pts	Qualification	England	Wales	Russia	Bosnia and Herzegovina	Kazakhstan
1	England	8	7	1	0	29	1	+28	22	2019 FIFA Women's World Cup	—	0–0	6–0	4–0	5–0
2	Wales	8	5	2	1	7	3	+4	17		0–3	—	3–0	1–0	1–0
3	Russia	8	4	1	3	16	13	+3	13		1–3	0–0	—	3–0	3–0
4	Bosnia and Herzegovina	8	1	0	7	3	19	−16	3 (Note: Head-to-head results: Kazakhstan 0–2 Bosnia and Herzegovina, Bosnia and Herzegovina 0–2 Kazakhstan (tied on head-to-head results, ranked on total goal difference).)		0–2	0–1	1–6	—	0–2
5	Kazakhstan	8	1	0	7	2	21	−19	3		0–6	0–1	0–3	0–2	—

Source: UEFA
Rules for classification: Qualification tiebreakers

== Matches ==
Times are CET/CEST, (Note: CEST (UTC+2) for dates between 26 March and 28 October 2017 and between 25 March and 27 October 2018, and CET (UTC+1) for all other dates.) as listed by UEFA (local times, if different, are in parentheses).

17 September 2017
14:00 (18:00 ALMT)

Kazakhstan	0–1	Wales
	Report	Fishlock 54'

Astana Arena, Astana
Attendance: 950
Referee: Ruzanna Petrosyan (Armenia)
19 September 2017
20:00 (19:00 BST)

England	6–0	Russia
Parris 11'; Taylor 14'; Nobbs 36'; Bronze 44'; Duggan 57', 84'	Report

Prenton Park, Birkenhead
Attendance: 7,047
Referee: Stéphanie Frappart (France)

21 October 2017
12:00 (16:00 ALMT)

Kazakhstan	0–2	Bosnia and Herzegovina
	Report	Kamerić 2'; Nikolić 63'

Astana Arena, Astana
Attendance: 100
Referee: Frida Nielsen (Denmark)
24 October 2017
18:00 (19:00 MSK)

Russia	0–0	Wales
	Report

Minor Sport Arena Petrovsky, Saint Petersburg
Attendance: 1,931
Referee: Vesna Budimir (Croatia)

24 November 2017
20:00 (19:00 GMT)

Wales	1–0	Kazakhstan
Ladd 83'	Report

Cardiff City Stadium, Cardiff
Attendance: 3,165
Referee: Simona Ghisletta (Switzerland)
24 November 2017
20:05 (19:05 GMT)

England	4–0	Bosnia and Herzegovina
Houghton 19', 54'; Parris 46'; Kirby 83' (pen.)	Report

Bescot Stadium, Walsall
Attendance: 10,026
Referee: Ewa Augustyn (Poland)

28 November 2017
13:30

Bosnia and Herzegovina	0–1	Wales
	Report	Green 58'

Bosnia and Herzegovina FA Training Centre, Zenica
Attendance: 500
Referee: Galiya Echeva (Bulgaria)
28 November 2017
20:05 (19:05 GMT)

England	5–0	Kazakhstan
Lawley 15'; Kirby 64' (pen.); Parris 69', 75'; Christiansen 76'	Report

Colchester Community Stadium, Colchester
Attendance: 9,643
Referee: Lois Otte (Belgium)

5 April 2018
16:00

Bosnia and Herzegovina	1–6	Russia
Todua 5' (o.g.)	Report	Danilova 26', 82'; Galay 39'; Morozova 53' (pen.); Smirnova 58', 90+2'

Bosnia and Herzegovina FA Training Centre, Zenica
Attendance: 250
Referee: Carina Vitulano (Italy)
6 April 2018
20:00 (19:00 BST)

England	0–0	Wales
	Report

St Mary's Stadium, Southampton
Attendance: 25,603
Referee: Pernilla Larsson (Sweden)

9 April 2018
12:00 (16:00 ALMT)

Kazakhstan	0–3	Russia
	Report	Danilova 59'; Smirnova 70', 90'

Astana Arena, Astana
Attendance: 150
Referee: Ivana Martinčić (Croatia)
10 April 2018
16:00

Bosnia and Herzegovina	0–2	England
	Report	Duggan 56'; Taylor 90+3' (pen.)

Bosnia and Herzegovina FA Training Centre, Zenica
Attendance: 340
Referee: Andromachi Tsiofliki (Greece)

7 June 2018
20:00 (19:00 BST)

Wales	1–0	Bosnia and Herzegovina
Green 62'	Report

Liberty Stadium, Swansea
Attendance: 2,645
Referee: Sofia Karagiorgi (Cyprus)
8 June 2018
18:00 (19:00 MSK)

Russia	1–3	England
Danilova 31'	Report	Parris 22'; Scott 27', 36'

Sapsan Arena, Moscow
Attendance: 1,859
Referee: Riem Hussein (Germany)

12 June 2018
17:30

Bosnia and Herzegovina	0–2	Kazakhstan
	Report	Spahić 33' (o.g.); Babshuk 74'

Bosnia and Herzegovina FA Training Centre, Zenica
Attendance: 322
Referee: Reelika Turi (Estonia)
12 June 2018
20:00 (19:00 BST)

Wales	3–0	Russia
Green 48', 62'; Harding 68'	Report

Newport Stadium, Newport
Attendance: 1,214
Referee: Lina Lehtovaara (Finland)

30 August 2018
17:00 (18:00 MSK)

Russia	3–0	Kazakhstan
Fedorova 4'; Smirnova 44', 56'	Report

Sapsan Arena, Moscow
Attendance: 317
Referee: Eleni Antoniou (Greece)
31 August 2018
20:45 (19:45 BST)

Wales	0–3	England
	Report	Duggan 57'; Scott 60'; Parris 69'

Rodney Parade, Newport
Attendance: 5,053
Referee: Katalin Kulcsár (Hungary)

4 September 2018
17:00 (18:00 MSK)

Russia	3–0	Bosnia and Herzegovina
Danilova 13', 18' (pen.); Kozhnikova 45'	Report

Sapsan Arena, Moscow
Attendance: 374
Referee: Tanja Subotič (Slovenia)
4 September 2018
17:00 (21:00 ALMT)

Kazakhstan	0–6	England
	Report	Mead 9' (pen.), 82'; Daly 35'; Christiansen 54'; Staniforth 66'; Bronze 87'

Pavlodar Central Stadium, Pavlodar
Attendance: 6,842
Referee: Hristiana Guteva (Bulgaria)

== Goalscorers ==
There were 57 goals scored in 20 matches, for an average of 2.85 goals per match.

6 goals

- (England) Nikita Parris
- (Russia) Elena Danilova
- (Russia) Nadezhda Smirnova

4 goals

- (England) Toni Duggan
- (Wales) Kayleigh Green

3 goals

- (England) Jill Scott

2 goals

- (England) Lucy Bronze
- (England) Izzy Christiansen
- (England) Steph Houghton
- (England) Fran Kirby
- (England) Beth Mead
- (England) Jodie Taylor

1 goal

- (Bosnia and Herzegovina) Alma Kamerić
- (Bosnia and Herzegovina) Milena Nikolić
- (England) Rachel Daly
- (England) Melissa Lawley
- (England) Jordan Nobbs
- (England) Lucy Staniforth
- (Kazakhstan) Yekaterina Babshuk
- (Russia) Marina Fedorova
- (Russia) Maria Galay
- (Russia) Anna Kozhnikova
- (Russia) Elena Morozova
- (Wales) Jess Fishlock
- (Wales) Natasha Harding
- (Wales) Hayley Ladd

1 own goal

- (Bosnia and Herzegovina) Amira Spahić (against Kazakhstan)
- (Russia) Elvira Todua (against Bosnia and Herzegovina)
