= Milica Stanković =

Serbian footballer (born 1991)

Personal information
- Date of birth: 4 March 1991 (age 35)
- Position: Forward

International career^{‡}
Years	Team	Apps	(Gls)
	Serbia	25	(1)
- ‡ National team caps and goals as of 7 April 2022

Milica Stanković (Serbian Cyrillic: Милица Станковић; born 4 March 1991) is a Serbian footballer who plays as a forward and has appeared for the Serbia women's national team.

== Career ==
Stanković has been capped for the Serbia national team, appearing for the team during the 2019 FIFA Women's World Cup qualifying cycle.

== International goals ==
Scores and results list Serbia's goal tally first.

No.	Date	Venue	Opponent	Score	Result	Competition	Ref.
1.	23 February 2021	Gold City Sports Complex, Kargıcak, Turkey	Russia	2–0	2–0	2021 Turkish Women's Cup	
