= Aleksandra Lazarević =

Serbian footballer (born 1995)

Personal information
- Date of birth: 29 November 1995 (age 30)
- Place of birth: Serbia, FR Yugoslavia
- Height: 1.71 m (5 ft 7 in)
- Position: Defender

Team information
- Current team: Zenit

Senior career*
Years	Team	Apps	(Gls)
2019–2021	Ryazan-VDV	54	(7)
2022-	Zenit	15	(0)

International career^{‡}
2015–	Serbia	9	(0)
- * Club domestic league appearances and goals as of 19:05, 13 August 2022 (UTC) ‡ National team caps and goals as of 18:24, 2 December 2023 (UTC)

Aleksandra Lazarević (Serbian Cyrillic: Александра Лазаревић; born 29 November 1995) is a Serbian footballer who plays as a defender for Zenit and has appeared for the Serbia women's national team.

== Career ==
Lazarević has been capped for the Serbia national team, appearing for the team during the 2019 FIFA Women's World Cup qualifying cycle.
