= 2019 FIFA Women's World Cup qualification =

Tournament details
- Dates: 3 April 2017 – 1 December 2018
- Teams: 144 (from 6 confederations)

Tournament statistics
- Matches played: 392
- Goals scored: 1,562 (3.98 per match)
- Top scorer: (Jamaica) Khadija Shaw (19 goals)

The 2019 FIFA Women's World Cup qualification process decided all 24 teams which played in the 2019 FIFA Women's World Cup, with the hosts France qualifying automatically. It was the eighth FIFA Women's World Cup, the quadrennial international women's football world championship tournament. The tournament was the third to be hosted in Europe, after the 1995 edition in Sweden and the 2011 edition in Germany.

== Qualified teams ==
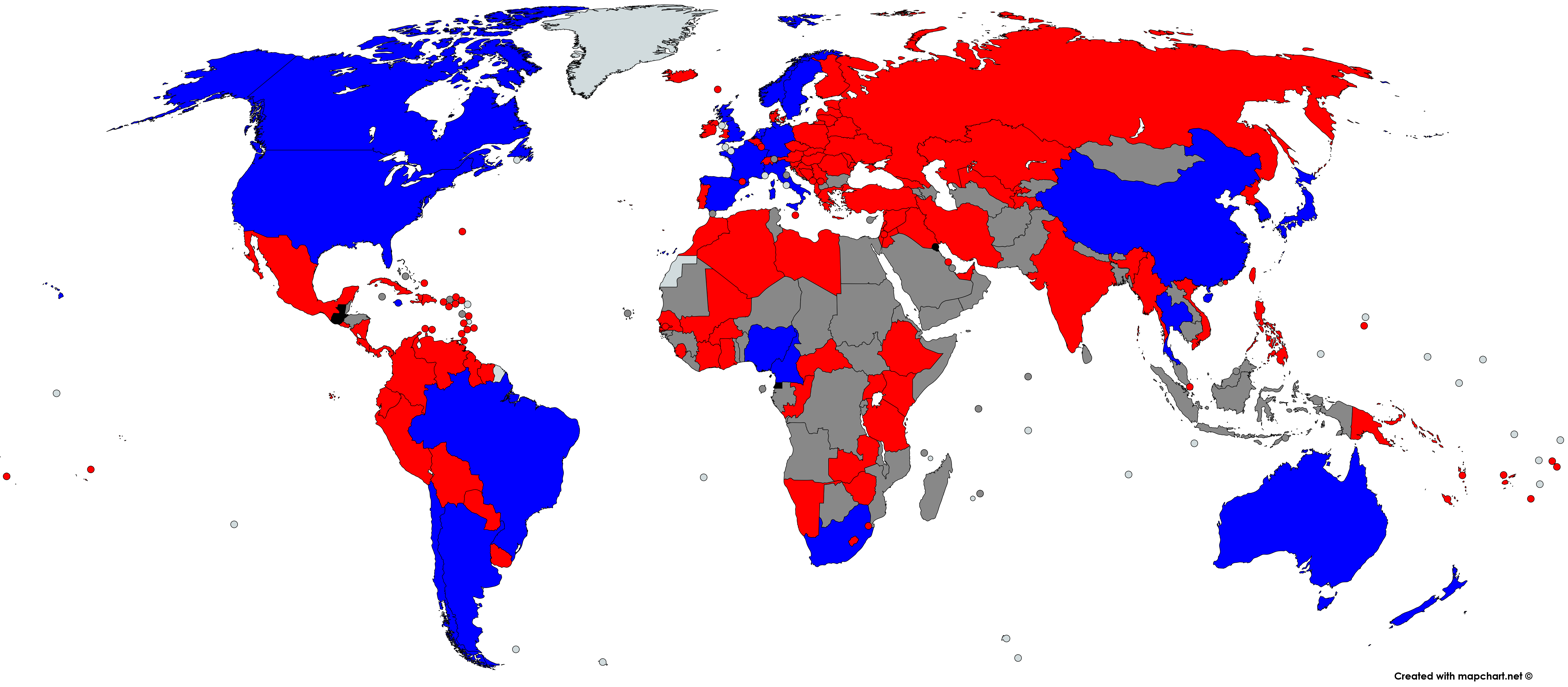
Teams qualified for World Cup Teams failed to qualify for World Cup Teams expelled from the tournament by FIFA Teams did not enter qualification

Team	Qualified as	Qualification date	Appearance in finals	Last appearance	Consecutive streak	Previous best performance
France	Hosts	19 March 2015	4th	2015	3	Fourth place (2011)
China	2018 AFC Women's Asian Cup 3rd place	9 April 2018	7th	2015	2	Runners-up (1999)
Thailand	2018 AFC Women's Asian Cup 4th place	12 April 2018	2nd	2015	2	Group stage (2015)
Australia	2018 AFC Women's Asian Cup runners-up	13 April 2018	7th	2015	7	Quarter-finals (2007, 2011, 2015)
Japan	2018 AFC Women's Asian Cup champions	13 April 2018	8th	2015	8	Champions (2011)
South Korea	2018 AFC Women's Asian Cup 5th place	16 April 2018	3rd	2015	2	Round of 16 (2015)
Brazil	2018 Copa América Femenina champions	19 April 2018	8th	2015	8	Runners-up (2007)
Chile	2018 Copa América Femenina runners-up	22 April 2018	1st	–	1	Debut
Spain	UEFA qualification Group 7 winners	8 June 2018	2nd	2015	2	Group stage (2015)
Italy	UEFA qualification Group 6 winners	8 June 2018	3rd	1999	1	Quarter-finals (1991)
England	UEFA qualification Group 1 winners	31 August 2018	5th	2015	4	Third place (2015)
Scotland	UEFA qualification Group 2 winners	4 September 2018	1st	–	1	Debut
Norway	UEFA qualification Group 3 winners	4 September 2018	8th	2015	8	Champions (1995)
Sweden	UEFA qualification Group 4 winners	4 September 2018	8th	2015	8	Runners-up (2003)
Germany	UEFA qualification Group 5 winners	4 September 2018	8th	2015	8	Champions (2003, 2007)
Canada	2018 CONCACAF Women's Championship runners-up	14 October 2018	7th	2015	7	Fourth place (2003)
United States	2018 CONCACAF Women's Championship champions	14 October 2018	8th	2015	8	Champions (1991, 1999, 2015)
Jamaica	2018 CONCACAF Women's Championship 3rd place	17 October 2018	1st	–	1	Debut
Netherlands	UEFA qualification play-off winners	13 November 2018	2nd	2015	2	Round of 16 (2015)
Argentina	CONCACAF–CONMEBOL play-off winners	13 November 2018	3rd	2007	1	Group stage (2003, 2007)
Nigeria	2018 Women's Africa Cup of Nations champions	27 November 2018	8th	2015	8	Quarter-finals (1999)
South Africa	2018 Women's Africa Cup of Nations runners-up	27 November 2018	1st	–	1	Debut
Cameroon	2018 Women's Africa Cup of Nations 3rd place	30 November 2018	2nd	2015	2	Round of 16 (2015)
New Zealand	2018 OFC Women's Nations Cup champions	1 December 2018	5th	2015	4	Group stage (1991, 2007, 2011, 2015)

== Qualification process ==
The slot allocation was approved by the FIFA Council on 13–14 October 2016. The slots for each confederation were unchanged from that of the previous tournament, except the slot for the hosts was moved from CONCACAF (Canada) to UEFA (France).

=== Summary of qualification ===
Qualifying matches started on 3 April 2017, and ended on 1 December 2018.

Apart from the host France, 207 of the 210 remaining FIFA member associations could qualify through their own confederation's qualifying process if they choose to enter. The exceptions were Guatemala and Kuwait, whose football associations were suspended by FIFA, and Equatorial Guinea, which were banned from the 2019 FIFA Women's World Cup. Guam, Lebanon, Sierra Leone, and Turks and Caicos Islands were initially drawn into qualifying stages but they withdrew from their qualifying tournaments.

More than 30 countries, mostly in Asia and Africa, did not enter qualification, including Saudi Arabia, Tunisia and Egypt, which qualified teams for the 2018 FIFA World Cup.

Confederation	Tournament	Available slots	Nations started	Nations eliminated	Nations qualified	Qualification start	Qualification end
AFC	2018 AFC Women's Asian Cup	5	24	19	5	3 April 2017	20 April 2018
CAF	2018 Women's Africa Cup of Nations	3	24^{[1]}	21	3	4 April 2018	1 December 2018
CONCACAF	2018 CONCACAF Women's Championship	3.5	28^{[2]}	25	3	5 May 2018	17 October 2018^{[3]}
CONMEBOL	2018 Copa América Femenina	2.5	10	7	3	4 April 2018	22 April 2018^{[3]}
OFC	2018 OFC Women's Nations Cup	1	11	10	1	24 August 2018	1 December 2018
UEFA	2019 FIFA Women's World Cup qualification (UEFA)	8+H	46+H	38	8+H	6 April 2017	13 November 2018
Total	2019 FIFA Women's World Cup qualification	23+H	143+H	120	23+H	3 April 2017	1 December 2018

^{1} 25 teams participate in the CAF qualification, however Equatorial Guinea cannot qualify for the World Cup regardless of their performance in the Africa Cup of Nations.
^{2} Although 30 teams participated in the CONCACAF qualification, Guadeloupe and Martinique are not FIFA members and thus were ineligible to qualify for the World Cup.
^{3} A team each from CONCACAF (Panama) and CONMEBOL (Argentina) competed in a play-off on 8 and 13 November 2018 for a place in the World Cup.

- H: Hosts

== Confederation qualification ==
=== AFC ===
As in the previous World Cup cycle, the AFC Women's Asian Cup served as the World Cup qualifying tournament for AFC members. The World Cup qualifying process was as follows:

- Qualifying stage: The qualifying for the 2018 AFC Women's Asian Cup was held from 3 to 12 April 2017. 24 teams entered the competition, with Japan, Australia, and China automatically qualified for the final tournament by their position as the top three teams of the 2014 AFC Women's Asian Cup and thus not participating in the qualifying competition. Jordan also automatically qualified for the final tournament as hosts, but decided to also participate in the qualifying competition. The 21 teams were drawn into one group of six teams and three groups of five teams. In each group, teams played each other once at a centralised venue, and the four group winners qualified for the final tournament. Since Jordan won their group, the runner-up of this group also qualified for the final tournament.
- Final tournament: Eight teams played in the 2018 AFC Women's Asian Cup, which was held from 6 to 20 April 2018 in Jordan. They were drawn into two groups of four teams. The top two teams of each group qualified for the 2019 FIFA Women's World Cup as well as advance to the knockout stage, while the third-placed teams of each group advanced to the fifth-placed play-off, where the winner of the play-off qualified for the World Cup.

==== Group stage ====
Group A

Pos	Team	Pld	Pts
1	China	3	9
2	Thailand	3	6
3	Philippines	3	3
4	Jordan (H)	3	0

Source: AFC
(H) Hosts
Group B

Pos	Team	Pld	Pts
1	Australia	3	5
2	Japan	3	5
3	South Korea	3	5
4	Vietnam	3	0

Source: AFC

==== Fifth place play-off ====
Team 1	Score	Team 2
Philippines	0–5	South Korea

=== CAF ===
As in the previous World Cup cycle, the Women's Africa Cup of Nations served as the World Cup qualifying tournament for CAF members. The World Cup qualifying process was as follows:

- Qualifying stage: The qualifying for the 2018 Women's Africa Cup of Nations was held from 4 April to 9 June 2018. 24 teams entered the qualifying competition, with four teams (Nigeria, Cameroon, Equatorial Guinea, South Africa) earning byes to the second round, and the remaining 20 teams entering the first round. Qualification ties were played on a home-and-away two-legged basis. The seven winners of the second round qualified for the final tournament to join the hosts Ghana who qualified automatically.
- Final tournament: Eight teams played in the 2018 Women's Africa Cup of Nations, which was held from 17 November to 1 December 2018 in Ghana. They were drawn into two groups of four teams. The top two teams of each group advanced to the knockout stage, where the winners of the semi-finals and the third place play-off qualified for the World Cup.

FIFA banned Equatorial Guinea from qualifying for the 2019 FIFA Women's World Cup, meaning they could not qualify for the World Cup regardless of their performance in the Women's Africa Cup of Nations.

==== Knockout stage ====
Semi-finals
27 November – Accra
Cameroon	0 (2)
Nigeria (p)	0 (4)
27 November – Cape Coast
South Africa	2
Mali	0

Final
1 December – Accra
Nigeria (p)	0 (4)
South Africa	0 (3)
Third place match
30 November – Cape Coast
Cameroon	4
Mali	2

=== CONCACAF ===
As in the previous World Cup cycle, the CONCACAF Women's Championship served as the World Cup qualifying tournament for CONCACAF members. The World Cup qualifying process was as follows:

- Qualifying stage: Regional qualification tournaments were held in the Central American Zone and the Caribbean Zone. Two teams from the Central American Zone and three teams from the Caribbean Zone qualified for the final tournament to join the three teams from the North American Zone, Canada, Mexico, and the United States, who qualified automatically.
- Final tournament: Eight teams played in the 2018 CONCACAF Women's Championship, which was held from 4 to 17 October 2018 in the United States. They were drawn into two groups of four teams. The top two teams of each group advanced to the knockout stage, where the winners of the semi-finals and the third place play-off qualified for the World Cup. The losers of the third-place play-off entered the CONCACAF–CONMEBOL play-off.

Guadeloupe and Martinique entered Caribbean qualifying for the 2018 CONCACAF Women's Championship. However, as they are not FIFA members, they were ineligible to qualify for the World Cup.

==== Knockout stage ====
Semi-finals
October 14 – Frisco, TX
Panama	0
Canada	7
October 14 – Frisco, TX
United States	6
Jamaica	0

Final
October 17 – Frisco, TX
Canada	0
United States	2
Third place play-off
October 17 – Frisco, TX
Panama	2 (2)
Jamaica (p)	2 (4)

=== CONMEBOL ===
As in the previous World Cup cycle, the Copa América Femenina served as the World Cup qualifying tournament for CONMEBOL members. The World Cup qualifying process was as follows:

- Final tournament: Ten teams played in the 2018 Copa América Femenina, which was held between 4 and 22 April 2018 in Chile. They were drawn into two groups of five teams. The top two teams of each group advanced to the round-robin final stage, where the top two teams qualified for the World Cup. The third-placed team entered the CONCACAF–CONMEBOL play-off.

==== Final stage ====
Pos	Team	Pld	Pts
1	Brazil	3	9
2	Chile	3	4
3	Argentina	3	3
4	Colombia	3	1

Source: CONMEBOL

=== OFC ===
As in the previous World Cup cycle, the OFC Women's Nations Cup served as the World Cup qualifying tournament for OFC members. The World Cup qualifying process was as follows:

- Qualifying stage: The four lowest-ranked teams based on previous regional performances of all women's national teams (American Samoa, Solomon Islands, Vanuatu and Fiji) entered the qualifying stage, which was held from 24 to 30 August 2018 in Fiji. The winner qualified for the final tournament, joining the other seven teams which automatically qualified.
- Final tournament: Eight teams played in the final tournament, which was held between 18 November to 1 December 2018 in New Caledonia. They were drawn into two groups of four teams. The top two teams of each group advanced to the knockout stage (semi-finals and final) to decide the winner of the OFC Women's Nations Cup which qualified for the World Cup.

==== Knockout stage ====
Semi-finals
28 November – Maré
Papua New Guinea	1
Fiji	5
28 November – Lifou
New Zealand	8
New Caledonia	0

Final
1 December – Nouméa
Fiji	0
New Zealand	8
Third place match
1 December – Nouméa
Papua New Guinea	7
New Caledonia	1

=== UEFA ===
As in the previous World Cup cycle, UEFA organised a tournament for its members designed only for World Cup qualifying. The World Cup qualifying process was as follows:

- Preliminary round: The 16 lowest-ranked teams of the 46 entrants according to their UEFA coefficient entered the preliminary round, which was held from 3 to 11 April 2017. They were drawn into four groups of four teams, where each group played in single round-robin format at one of the pre-selected hosts. The four group winners and the best runner-up (not counting results against the fourth-placed team) advanced to the qualifying group stage.
- Qualifying group stage: 35 teams, including the 30 highest-ranked teams which received byes and the five qualifiers from the preliminary round, played in the qualifying group stage, which was held on dates in the FIFA Women's International Match Calendar from 11 September 2017 to 4 September 2018. They were drawn into seven groups of five teams, where each group was played in home-and-away round-robin format. The seven group winners qualified for the 2019 FIFA Women's World Cup, while the four best runners-up (not counting results against the fifth-placed team) advanced to the play-offs.
- Play-offs: The four teams played two knockout rounds of home-and-away two-legged matches, which were held from 1 to 9 October and 5 to 13 November 2018, where the winner of the play-off final round qualified for the World Cup.

==== Qualifying group stage ====
Qualification to 2019 FIFA Women's World Cup
Advance to play-offs

Group 1
Group 2
Group 3

Pos	Team	Pld	Pts
1	England	8	22
2	Wales	8	17
3	Russia	8	13
4	Bosnia and Herzegovina	8	3
5	Kazakhstan	8	3

Source: UEFA

Pos	Team	Pld	Pts
1	Scotland	8	21
2	Switzerland	8	19
3	Poland	8	11
4	Albania	8	4
5	Belarus	8	3

Source: UEFA

Pos	Team	Pld	Pts
1	Norway	8	21
2	Netherlands	8	19
3	Republic of Ireland	8	13
4	Northern Ireland	8	3
5	Slovakia	8	3

Source: UEFA
Group 4
Group 5
Group 6

Pos	Team	Pld	Pts
1	Sweden	8	21
2	Denmark	8	16
3	Ukraine	8	13
4	Hungary	8	4
5	Croatia	8	3

Source: UEFA

Pos	Team	Pld	Pts
1	Germany	8	21
2	Iceland	8	17
3	Czech Republic	8	14
4	Slovenia	8	6
5	Faroe Islands	8	0

Source: UEFA

Pos	Team	Pld	Pts
1	Italy	8	21
2	Belgium	8	19
3	Portugal	8	11
4	Romania	8	5
5	Moldova	8	1

Source: UEFA
Group 7

Pos	Team	Pld	Pts
1	Spain	8	24
2	Austria	8	16
3	Finland	8	10
4	Serbia	8	7
5	Israel	8	1

Source: UEFA

Ranking of second-placed teams (only results against first, third and fourth-placed teams taken into account)

Pos	Grp	Team	Pld	W	D	L	GF	GA	GD	Pts	Qualification
1	3	Netherlands	6	4	1	1	16	2	+14	13	Play-offs
2	2	Switzerland	6	4	1	1	13	5	+8	13	Play-offs
3	6	Belgium	6	4	1	1	9	6	+3	13	Play-offs
4	4	Denmark	6	4	0	2	17	7	+10	12	Play-offs
5	5	Iceland	6	3	2	1	9	6	+3	11	
6	1	Wales	6	3	2	1	5	3	+2	11	
7	7	Austria	6	3	1	2	11	7	+4	10	

Source: UEFA
Rules for classification: 1) points; 2) goal difference; 3) goals scored; 4) away goals scored; 5) disciplinary points; 6) coefficient.

==== Play-offs ====
The play-off final winner qualifies for the 2019 FIFA Women's World Cup.

Play-off semi-finals
Netherlands	2	2	4
Denmark	0	1	1
Belgium	2	1	3
Switzerland (a)	2	1	3

Play-off final
Netherlands	3	1	4
Switzerland	0	1	1

== CONMEBOL–CONCACAF play-off ==
The inter-confederation play-off was contested between CONCACAF's fourth-placed team Panama and CONMEBOL's third-placed team Argentina. The winners qualified for the World Cup. The draw for the order of legs was held on 9 June 2018 in Zürich during a meeting between the secretaries general of CONCACAF and CONMEBOL. Argentina was drawn to host the first leg, while Panama (the identity of the team from CONCACAF was not known at time of draw) was drawn to host the second leg.

The matches took place on 8 and 13 November 2018, during the women's international match calendar period.

Team 1	Agg.	Team 2	1st leg	2nd leg
Argentina	5–1	Panama	4–0	1–1

== Top goalscorers ==
There were 1,562 goals scored in 392 matches, for an average of 3.98 goals per match.

19 goals

- (Jamaica) Khadija Shaw

14 goals

- (Jordan) Maysa Jbarah

10 goals

- (Belgium) Janice Cayman

9 goals

- (Colombia) Catalina Usme
- (Cuba) María Pérez
- (Fiji) Trina Davis
- (Jordan) Stephanie Al-Naber

8 goals

- (Ethiopia) Loza Abera
- (Myanmar) Win Theingi Tun
- (New Zealand) Sarah Gregorius
- (Papua New Guinea) Meagen Gunemba

7 goals

- (China) Li Ying
- (Cuba) Rachel Peláez
- (Denmark) Nadia Nadim
- (Fiji) Cema Nasau
- (Fiji) Luisa Tamanitoakula
- (Italy) Cristiana Girelli
- (Jordan) Shahnaz Jebreen
- (Netherlands) Vivianne Miedema
- (Norway) Lisa-Marie Karlseng Utland
- (Spain) Jennifer Hermoso
- (Trinidad and Tobago) Kayla Taylor
- (United States) Alex Morgan

6 goals

- (Brazil) Bia Zaneratto
- (Canada) Adriana Leon
- (Denmark) Sanne Troelsgaard Nielsen
- (England) Nikita Parris
- (Germany) Alexandra Popp
- (Germany) Lea Schüller
- (Iran) Zahra Ghanbari
- (Jamaica) Jody Brown
- (Netherlands) Sherida Spitse
- (New Zealand) Emma Rolston
- (New Zealand) Rosie White
- (Nigeria) Desire Oparanozie
- (Norway) Caroline Graham Hansen
- (Russia) Elena Danilova
- (Russia) Nadezhda Smirnova
- (Saint Kitts and Nevis) Phoenetia Browne
- (South Korea) Cho So-hyun
- (Switzerland) Lara Dickenmann
- (Trinidad and Tobago) Mariah Shade
- (Vietnam) Huỳnh Như
