= 2019 FIFA Women's World Cup qualification (CONMEBOL–CONCACAF play-off) =

- Event: 2019 FIFA Women's World Cup qualification
Argentina	Panama
(Argentina)	(Panama)
5	1
- on aggregate

First leg
Argentina	Panama
4	0
- Date: 8 November 2018
- Venue: Estadio Julio Humberto Grondona, Sarandí
- Referee: Jana Adámková (Czech Republic)

Second leg
Panama	Argentina
1	1
- Date: 13 November 2018
- Venue: Estadio Rommel Fernández, Panama City
- Referee: Kateryna Monzul (Ukraine)

In the 2019 FIFA Women's World Cup qualification process, one spot in the final tournament was allocated to the winner of a two-legged home-and-away play-off between the fourth-placed team from CONCACAF (Panama) and the third-placed team from CONMEBOL (Argentina).

== Qualified teams ==
Confederation	Placement	Team
CONMEBOL	2018 Copa América Femenina 3rd place	Argentina
CONCACAF	2018 CONCACAF Women's Championship 4th place	Panama

== Summary ==
The draw for the order of legs was held on 9 June 2018 in Zürich during a meeting between the secretaries general of CONCACAF and CONMEBOL. Argentina was drawn to host the first leg, while Panama (the identity of the team from CONCACAF was not known at time of draw) was drawn to host the second leg.

The matches took place on 8 and 13 November 2018, during the women's international match calendar period.

Team 1	Agg.	Team 2	1st leg	2nd leg
Argentina	5–1	Panama	4–0	1–1

== Matches ==
8 November 2018
19:00 UTC−3

Argentina	4–0	Panama
Larroquette 20'; Stábile 26', 90+7' (pen.); Rodríguez 90+4'	Report

Estadio Julio Humberto Grondona, Sarandí
Referee: Jana Adámková (Czech Republic)
13 November 2018
20:00 UTC−5

Panama	1–1	Argentina
Mills 37'	Report	Bonsegundo 65'

Estadio Rommel Fernández, Panama City
Referee: Kateryna Monzul (Ukraine)

Argentina won 5–1 on aggregate and qualified for the 2019 FIFA Women's World Cup.

== Goalscorers ==
There were 6 goals scored in 2 matches, for an average of 3 goals per match.

2 goals

- (Argentina) Eliana Stábile

1 goal

- (Argentina) Florencia Bonsegundo
- (Argentina) Mariana Larroquette
- (Argentina) Yamila Rodríguez
- (Panama) Natalia Mills
