= Mimmi Wahlström =

Swedish footballer (born 1994)

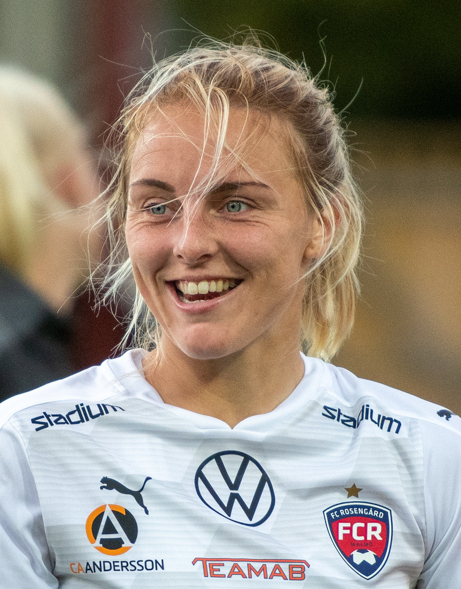
- Wahlström with FC Rosengård in 2020

Personal information
- Birth name: Ann Mimmi Ellenore Larsson
- Date of birth: 9 April 1994 (age 32)
- Place of birth: Torsby, Sweden
- Height: 1.68 m (5 ft 6 in)
- Position: Forward

Team information
- Current team: Djurgårdens IF
- Number: 14

Senior career*
Years	Team	Apps	(Gls)
2012–2015	Mallbackens IF	89	(46)
2016–2018	Eskilstuna United	60	(30)
2019	Linkopings	21	(9)
2020–2022	FC Rosengård	38	(19)
2023	Kansas City Current	20	(2)
2024	RB Leipzig	11	(3)
2024–	Djurgårdens IF	28	(9)

International career
2010–2011	Sweden U17	14	(2)
2012–2013	Sweden U19	18	(4)
2013–2016	Sweden U23	12	(4)
2016–2021	Sweden	30	(6)
Medal record
Women's soccer
Representing Sweden
FIFA Women's World Cup
Bronze medal – third place	2019 France	Team
- * Club domestic league appearances and goals as of 21:35, 7 October 2026 (UTC)

Ann Mimmi Ellenore Wahlström (née Larsson; born 9 April 1994) is a Swedish professional footballer who plays as a forward for Djurgårdens IF.

== Club career ==
In July 2024, Wahlström joined Djurgårdens IF from RB Leipzig on a contract lasting until the 2026 season.

== Personal life ==
In June 2024, she married Markus Wahlström.

== International goals ==
Goal	Date	Location	Opponent	Score	Result	Competition
1	2016-10-21	Gothenburg, Sweden	Iran	1–0	7–0	Friendly
2	2018-02-28	Parchal, Portugal	Canada	0–1	1–3	2018 Algarve Cup
3	2018-04-05	Szombathely, Hungary	Hungary	1–4	1–4	2019 World Cup qualification
4	2019-02-27	Faro/Loulé, Portugal	Switzerland	1–0	4–1	2019 Algarve Cup
5	2019-02-27	Faro/Loulé, Portugal	Switzerland	2–1	4–1	2019 Algarve Cup
6	2019-02-27	Faro/Loulé, Portugal	Switzerland	4–1	4–1	2019 Algarve Cup

== Honours ==
Sweden

- Algarve Cup: 2018
