= 2019 FIFA Women's World Cup qualification – UEFA play-offs =

The UEFA play-offs of the 2019 FIFA Women's World Cup qualification competition involve the four runners-up with the best records among all seven groups in the qualifying group stage.

== Ranking of second-placed teams ==
To determine the four best second-placed teams from the qualifying group stage which advance to the play-offs, only the results of the second-placed teams against the first, third and fourth-placed teams in their group are taken into account, while results against the fifth-placed team are not included. As a result, six matches played by each second-placed team will count for the purposes of determining the ranking.

Pos	Grp	Team	Pld	W	D	L	GF	GA	GD	Pts	Qualification
1	3	Netherlands	6	4	1	1	16	2	+14	13	Play-offs
2	2	Switzerland	6	4	1	1	13	5	+8	13	Play-offs
3	6	Belgium	6	4	1	1	9	6	+3	13	Play-offs
4	4	Denmark	6	4	0	2	17	7	+10	12	Play-offs
5	5	Iceland	6	3	2	1	9	6	+3	11	
6	1	Wales	6	3	2	1	5	3	+2	11	
7	7	Austria	6	3	1	2	11	7	+4	10	

Source: UEFA
Rules for classification: 1) points; 2) goal difference; 3) goals scored; 4) away goals scored; 5) disciplinary points; 6) coefficient.

== Draw ==
The draw for the play-offs was held on 7 September 2018, 14:00 CEST (UTC+2), at the UEFA headquarters in Nyon, Switzerland. The four teams were drawn into two knockout rounds (semi-finals and final) of home-and-away two-legged format.

For the semi-finals, two teams were seeded and two teams were unseeded, based on their latest coefficient ranking after the completion of the qualifying group stage, calculated based on the following:

- 2015 FIFA Women's World Cup final tournament and qualifying competition (20%)
- UEFA Women's Euro 2017 qualifying competition (40%)
- 2019 FIFA Women's World Cup qualifying competition (preliminary round and group stage) (40%)

Seeded
Team	Coeff	Rank
Netherlands	39,430	4
Switzerland	37,031	6

Unseeded
Team	Coeff	Rank
Denmark	34,185	11
Belgium	32,738	13

For each semi-final, a seeded team was drawn against an unseeded team, with the order of legs decided by draw. A draw was also held for the final between the two winners of the semi-finals to decide the order of legs.

== Bracket ==
The play-off final winner qualifies for the 2019 FIFA Women's World Cup.

Play-off semi-finals
Netherlands	2	2	4
Denmark	0	1	1
Belgium	2	1	3
Switzerland (a)	2	1	3

Play-off final
Netherlands	3	1	4
Switzerland	0	1	1

== Play-off semi-finals ==
=== Overview ===
All times are CEST (UTC+2), as listed by UEFA.

Team 1	Agg.	Team 2	1st leg	2nd leg
Netherlands	4–1	Denmark	2–0	2–1
Belgium	3–3 (a)	Switzerland	2–2	1–1

=== Matches ===
5 October 2018
20:00

Netherlands	2–0	Denmark
Beerensteyn 21'; Van de Sanden 42'	Report

Rat Verlegh Stadion, Breda
Attendance: 17,000
Referee: Kateryna Monzul (Ukraine)
9 October 2018
18:00

Denmark	1–2	Netherlands
Nadim 5' (pen.)	Report	Beerensteyn 7', 90+2'

Viborg Stadium, Viborg
Attendance: 5,374
Referee: Sara Persson (Sweden)

Netherlands won 4–1 on aggregate.

5 October 2018
20:30

Belgium	2–2	Switzerland
Cayman 5'; De Neve 60'	Report	Lehmann 55', 87'

Den Dreef, Leuven
Attendance: 7,300
Referee: Anastasia Pustovoitova (Russia)
9 October 2018
19:00

Switzerland	1–1	Belgium
Reuteler 23'	Report	De Caigny 77'

Tissot Arena, Biel/Bienne
Attendance: 2,650
Referee: Jana Adámková (Czech Republic)

3–3 on aggregate. Switzerland won on away goals.

== Play-off final ==
=== Overview ===
The winner Netherlands qualifies for the 2019 FIFA Women's World Cup. All times are CET (UTC+1), as listed by UEFA.

Team 1	Agg.	Team 2	1st leg	2nd leg
Netherlands	4–1	Switzerland	3–0	1–1

=== Matches ===
9 November 2018
20:00

Netherlands	3–0	Switzerland
Spitse 49'; Martens 71'; Miedema 80'	Report

Stadion Galgenwaard, Utrecht
Attendance: 23,750
Referee: Pernilla Larsson (Sweden)
13 November 2018
19:00

Switzerland	1–1	Netherlands
Sow 71'	Report	Miedema 52'

LIPO Park, Schaffhausen
Attendance: 5,148
Referee: Stéphanie Frappart (France)

Netherlands won 4–1 on aggregate.

== Goalscorers ==
There were 16 goals scored in 6 matches, for an average of 2.67 goals per match.

3 goals

- (Netherlands) Lineth Beerensteyn

2 goals

- (Netherlands) Vivianne Miedema
- (Switzerland) Alisha Lehmann

1 goal

- (Belgium) Janice Cayman
- (Belgium) Tine De Caigny
- (Belgium) Laura De Neve
- (Denmark) Nadia Nadim
- (Netherlands) Lieke Martens
- (Netherlands) Shanice van de Sanden
- (Netherlands) Sherida Spitse
- (Switzerland) Géraldine Reuteler
- (Switzerland) Coumba Sow
