= Hanna Folkesson =

Swedish footballer

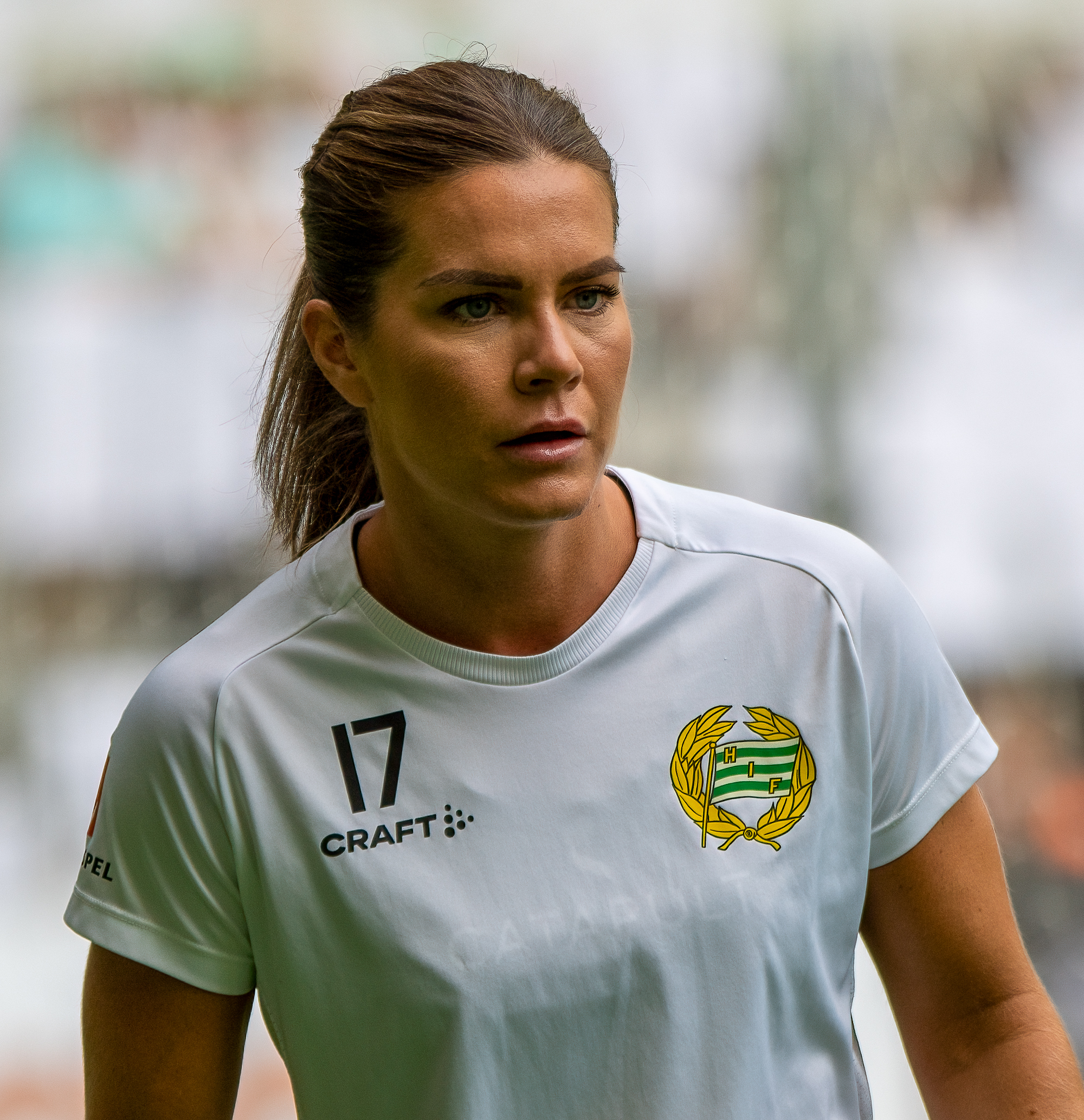
- Folkesson in 2022

Personal information
- Full name: Hanna Folkesson
- Date of birth: 15 June 1988 (age 38)
- Place of birth: Umeå, Sweden
- Height: 1.67 m (5 ft 6 in)
- Position: Midfielder

Youth career
- Umedalens IF

Senior career*
Years	Team	Apps	(Gls)
2006–2008	Umeå Södra FF	18	(1)
2009–2012	AIK	80	(6)
2013–2014	Umeå IK	35	(2)
2015	KIF Orebro	0	(0)
2016	Umeå IK	9	(0)
2017–2018	Rosengard	44	(2)
2019	Djurgårdens IF	21	(1)
2020–2023	Hammarby IF	51	(6)

International career^{‡}
2006	Sweden U19		
2013–2019	Sweden	48	(1)
- * Club domestic league appearances and goals as of 5 November 2022 ‡ National team caps and goals as of 5 December 2017

Hanna Folkesson (born 15 June 1988) is a Swedish footballer who played as a midfielder for Hammarby IF and the Sweden women's national team.

== Club career ==
Folkesson joined Umeå IK in 2013 from relegated AIK, where she had been captain.

== International career ==
Folkesson made her debut for the senior Sweden team in a 1–1 Algarve Cup draw with China on 6 March 2013.

She suffered a knee ligament injury in training for a pre tournament friendly with Norway and was ruled out of UEFA Women's Euro 2013.

=== International goal ===
Goal	Date	Location	Opponent	Score	Result	Competition
1	2018-06-07	Gothenburg, Sweden	Croatia	4–0	4–0	2019 World Cup qualification

== Honours ==
Sweden

- Algarve Cup: 2018
