= Nadia Nadim =

Afghan-Danish footballer (born 1988)

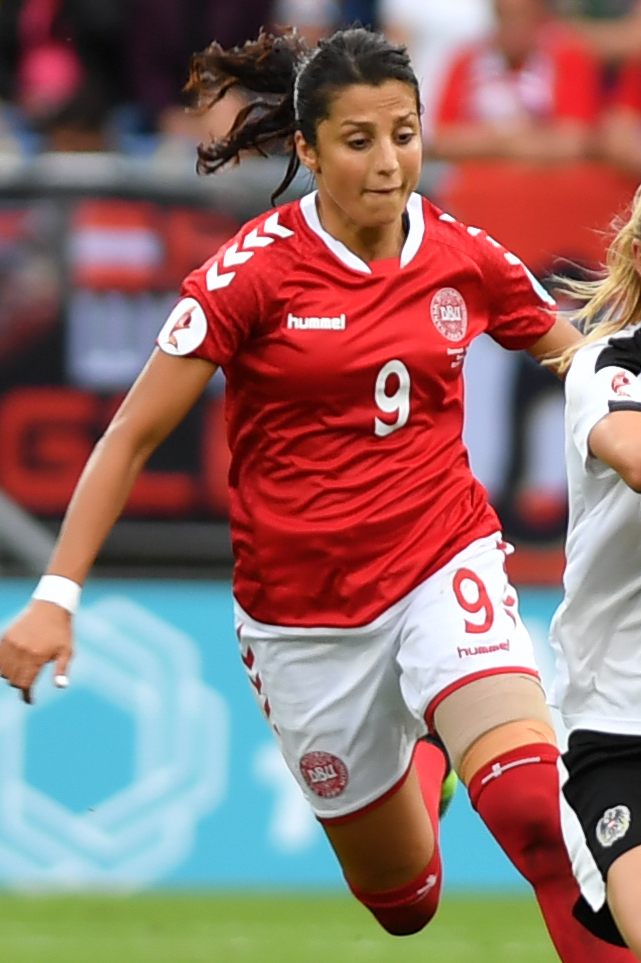
- Nadim with Denmark at Euro 2017

Personal information
- Date of birth: 2 January 1988 (age 38)
- Place of birth: Herat, Afghanistan
- Height: 1.75 m (5 ft 9 in)
- Position: Forward

Team information
- Current team: HB Køge

Youth career
- 2000–?: Gug Boldklub
- ?–2005: B52/Aalborg FC
- 2005–2006: Team Viborg

Senior career*
Years	Team	Apps	(Gls)
2006–2012	IK Skovbakken	91	(88)
2012–2014	Fortuna Hjørring	43	(31)
2014–2016	Sky Blue FC	24	(13)
2015–2016	→ Fortuna Hjørring (loan)	15	(12)
2016–2017	Portland Thorns FC	37	(19)
2018	Manchester City	15	(6)
2019–2021	Paris Saint-Germain	27	(18)
2021–2023	Racing Louisville	25	(10)
2024–2025	AC Milan	27	(4)
2025	→ Hammarby (loan)	7	(2)
2025–	HB Køge	9	(12)

International career^{‡}
2009–2025	Denmark	108	(38)
Medal record
Representing Denmark
Runner-up	UEFA Women's Championship	2017
- * Club domestic league appearances and goals as of 28 August 2028 ‡ National team caps and goals as of 8 July 2025

Nadia Nadim (Note: Pashto: نادیا ندیم Dari: نادیا ندیم) (born 2 January 1988) is a professional footballer who plays as a striker for the A-Liga club HB Køge. Born in Afghanistan, she has played for the Denmark national team.

Nadim is considered the most influential and greatest Afghan female footballer of all time, particularly because she has won league titles in two countries, the USA league title in 2017 with the Portland Thorns and the French league title in 2020–21 with Paris Saint-Germain. Nadim was named the Danish Footballer of the Year in 2016 and 2017.

== Early life and career ==
Nadia was born in Herat, Afghanistan and raised there during her early childhood in a wealthy family. When Nadim was 9 years old her father, an Afghan National Army (ANA) general, was executed by the Taliban. When she was 11, Nadim, her mother and her four sisters fled Afghanistan and arrived in Denmark as refugees. She recounted later that when she was in the refugee camp she received football training. Shortly after arriving in Denmark, when 12 years old, she continued playing football and joined the small local club GUG in Aalborg. Her senior career began at B52 Aalborg and Team Viborg.

== Club career ==
=== Early career ===
Nadim played for B52 Aalborg, Team Viborg from 2005 to 2006 and IK Skovbakken from 2006 to 2012, before moving to Fortuna Hjørring in 2012. She made her Champions League debut in September the same year, scoring both goals in a 2–1 win over Scottish Champions Glasgow City.

=== Sky Blue FC ===
Nadim joined NWSL club Sky Blue FC near the end of the 2014 NWSL season. Playing in six games, she scored seven goals and registered three assists. She was named player of the week on 19 August and player of the month for the NWSL on 14 August. On 16 February 2015, Sky Blue announced that Nadim had been signed to play for Sky Blue in the 2015 season as well.

=== Portland Thorns FC ===
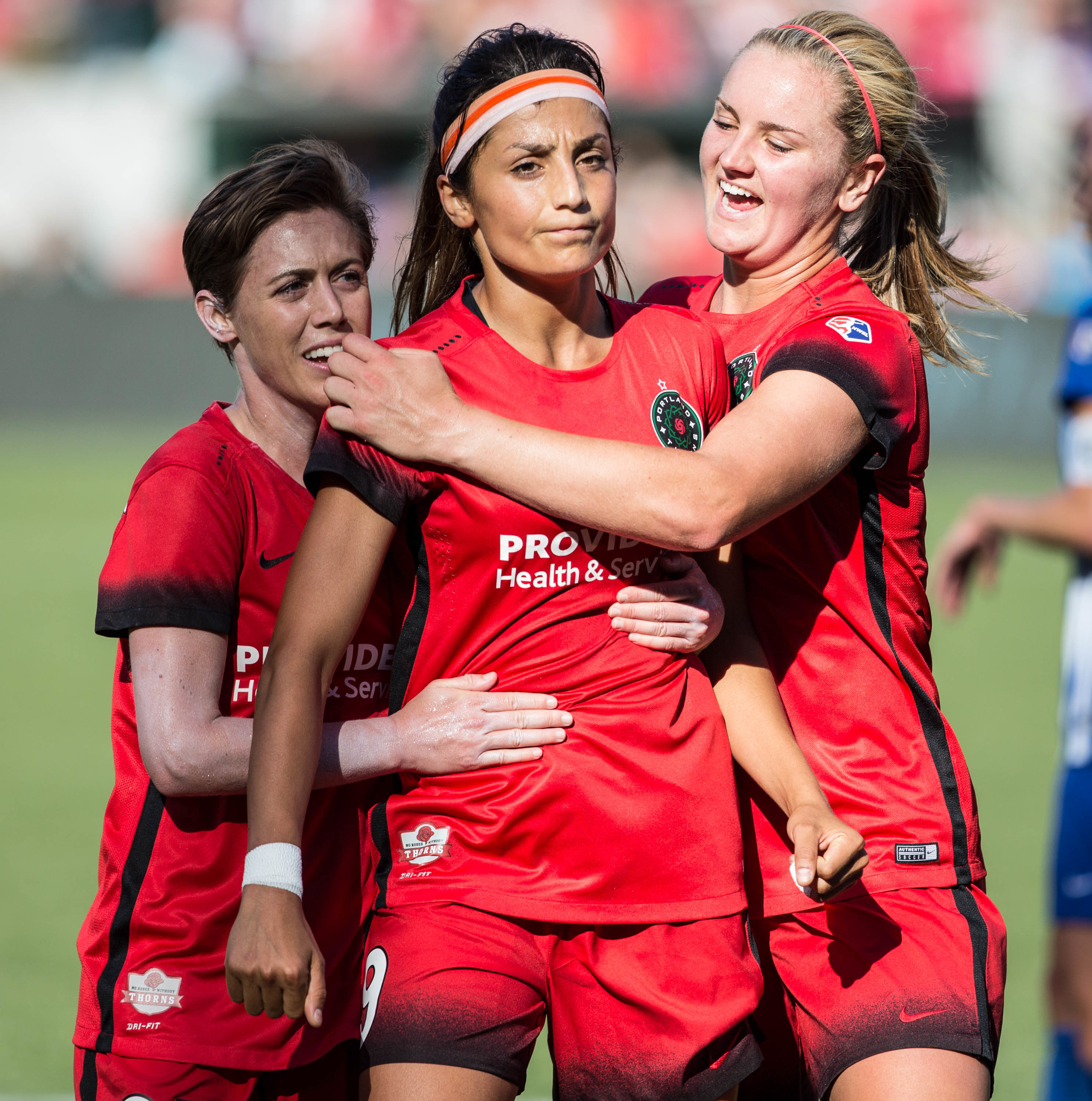
Nadim celebrates a goal for Portland Thorns in 2016 with Meghan Klingenberg and Lindsey Horan.

On 14 January 2016, Nadim was traded to Portland Thorns FC. Playing as a striker, she finished the 2016 season as the team's top scorer with nine goals in 20 games as the team won the 2016 NWSL Shield. In the 2017 season, she helped the team to a second-place finish in the league and victory in the NWSL Championship game.

=== Manchester City ===
On 28 September 2017, Nadim signed for FA Women's Super League side Manchester City for the 2018 season. She joined the club in January 2018, and made her debut with Manchester City on 7 January 2018 in a 5–2 win over Reading. After six minutes on the ground she scored her first goal for the team, and 26 minutes later she made an assist when Manchester City scored their second goal in the match. In her second match for the team she scored the winning goal in a 1–0 victory over Chelsea in the semi-final of the Continental Tyres Cup.

On 26 July 2018, while on the US tour with Manchester City, the BBC reported that Nadim had requested a transfer out of the club, stating that she had never felt at home there and wanted to leave. On 19 December 2018, Manchester City announced that Nadim would be departing the club and her contract would be terminated on 1 January 2019, allowing her to sign with another club.

=== Paris Saint-Germain ===
On 3 January 2019, Nadim signed for Paris Saint-Germain.

On 9 July 2019, Nadim extended her contract for Paris Saint-Germain after a successful first season. She was later rewarded with the captain's armband and named the team's vice captain for the 2019–20 season. She scored 13 goals and made 13 assists in 16 league and cup games.

=== Racing Louisville FC ===
On 9 June 2021, Nadim signed with Racing Louisville FC, returning to the NWSL four years after leaving Portland Thorns FC for Manchester City.

In September 2021, with the NWSL reeling from abuse scandals, she accused NJ/NY Gotham FC management of forging her signature on a contract extension so they could trade her rights to Portland in January 2016. She also accused league staffers of pressuring her to have a surgery for her season-ending ACL injury in the United States rather than abroad, threatening that "if something went wrong with the surgery outside of US they could consider taking actions against me."

Nadim's Racing Louisville contract expired in December 2023. She left Racing Louisville as the club's best ever goal scorer.

=== AC Milan ===
On 27 January 2024, Nadim signed with AC Milan for the rest of the 2023–24 season. On 26 March 2025, AC Milan announced that Nadim would be on loan with Hammarby IF for the remainder of the season. After she left for Hammerby she complained that her coach in Milan, Suzanne Bakker, made her feel like "training in the refugee camp was better", referencing her past (see above).

=== HB Køge ===
In August 2025, Nadim signed with HB Køge for the 2025-26 season on a one-year contract. In her first season she won the Danish Cup following their 4–1 victory against FC Nordsjælland. In the 2025–26 season she was the topscorer with 16 goals, when HB Køge won the Danish Championship. In August 2026 she extended her contract with HB Køge for another year.

== International career ==
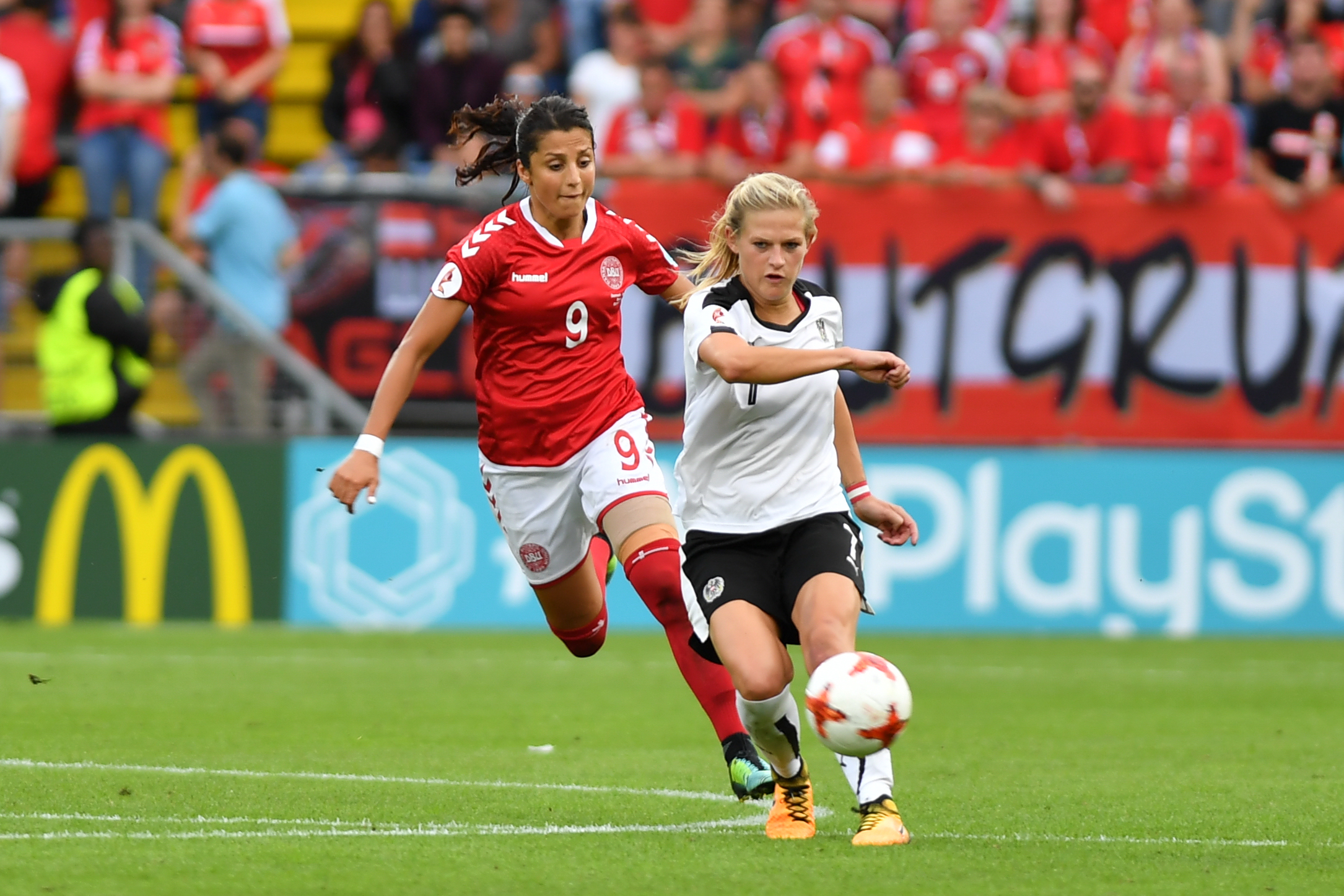
Nadim (left) playing for Denmark in 2017

Under Danish nationality law Nadim could not apply for citizenship until turning 18 years old in 2006. When citizenship was eventually granted in 2008, FIFA eligibility rules blocked Nadim from playing for Denmark, because she had not yet been resident for the requisite five years after turning 18. A subsequent challenge from the Danish Football Association (DBU) led to FIFA's legal department making an exception to the rules in Nadim's case.

Nadim immediately became a member of the Denmark national team, making her debut in the 2009 Algarve Cup in a 2–0 defeat by the United States. In doing so, she became the first naturalised Dane to represent a Denmark senior national football team. She participated in all three of Denmark's games at UEFA European Championship 2009 in Finland.

She was named in national coach Kenneth Heiner-Møller's Denmark squad for UEFA European Championship 2013. In Denmark's opening group match against hosts Sweden, Nadim featured as a substitute in an eventful 1–1 draw.

In the UEFA Women's Euro 2017 tournament, she was instrumental in Denmark's advancement, scoring the tying goal in Denmark's eventual 2–1 win over favorites Germany in the knockout stages, and scoring a goal from a penalty in the final, which Denmark ultimately lost to the hosts Netherlands 4–2.

On 27 October 2020, Denmark had to win away against Italy to qualify for the UEFA European Championship 2022, and Nadim was crowned player of the match after scoring two crucial goals in Denmark's 3–1 win over Italy in Florence. The two goals secured Denmark's spot in the upcoming Euros.

On 24 June 2022, she played her 100th match for Denmark in a friendly match against Brazil, an historic occasion for the national team as their first ever match in the Danish national stadium.

After 16 years with the national team, Nadim announced on 23 June 2025 that she would be retiring after the 2025 Euros. She was called up for the tournament after not having featured in a match for Denmark since December 2023.

== Style of play ==
Nadim is recognized for her energetic and determined style of play. She is successful from the penalty spot, having converted all but one of her penalties in the NWSL (and with the one miss being a save by the goalkeeper and immediately scored by Nadim on the rebound) and converting both of her attempts at Euro 2017.

== Controversies ==
In December 2021, Nadim received criticism in the media for describing Qatar as a nation that helps people in need. Her positive description of the state was in conflict with the general consensus in the Danish population and the opinion formulated by the Danish FA on the suppression of human rights and poor conditions for migrant workers in Qatar. Subsequently, Nadim denied having received money for her performance in Qatar, which turned out to be untrue when Danish newspaper B.T. found out that she had received payment for attending the education summit in the country.

As a consequence of her role as an ambassador for World Cup in Qatar, Danish Refugee Council removed Nadim from her role as a goodwill ambassador. Nadim stated on her Twitter that her collaboration with the Danish Refugee Council had been inactive since the beginning of 2019. However, B.T. demonstrated that this statement was inaccurate.

== Personal life ==
Nadim attended medical school at Aarhus University (remotely during the football season) with the aim of becoming a reconstructive surgeon when her playing days are over, with the aim of helping refugees. In 2020, she was assisting in surgery. She qualified as a doctor in January 2022.

Nadim is Muslim, and speaks eight languages.

Afghan singer Aryana Sayeed is her aunt.

In 2018, Forbes ranked her Number 20 in their "Most Powerful Women in International Sports" list.

In 2024, Corriere della Sera included her in its "Women of the year" list.

Her mother, Hamida Nadim, was killed in a motor vehicle accident on 23 November 2022, aged 57. When Nadia learned that her mother had died, she departed during her work as a pundit for British broadcaster ITV at the Denmark–Tunisia match in the Men's World Cup.

On August 9, 2024, Nadim married her long-term partner Idrees in Istanbul. Nadim's aunt Aryana Sayeed performed at the wedding. According to Nadim's sister, the couple had met when they both resided in Viby J near Aarhus.

== Endorsements ==
Nadia signed a representation contract with Nike in 2017, making her the first ever Danish female football player to be represented by Nike. Nike has used Nadia in many of their branches on top of doing work for the football department. She has also done commercials for Air Jordan as well as Nike's collaborations with Martine Rose. Besides her work with Nike, Nadia is also known for her work with Visa and Hugo Boss.

In 2016, Danish TV station DR released a four-episode long documentary about Nadia that followed her from Denmark to the United States, documenting her player development with the Portland Thorns.

In 2018, Danish publisher JP/Politiken published Nadia Nadim's autobiography called "Min Historie" which translates to "My Story". The book got nominated for Sports book of the year. The book was released in French on 26 May 2021, through the French publisher Hachette Book Group.

In 2023, Nadia entered a collaboration with H&M along with Zlatan Ibrahimovic, to be the face of H&M's sports section called H&M Move

== Career statistics ==
=== Goals ===
Key (expand for notes on "international goals" and sorting)
Location	Geographic location of the venue where the competition occurred Sorted by country name first, then by city name
Lineup	Start – played entire match on minute (off player) – substituted on at the minute indicated, and player was substituted off at the same time off minute (on player) – substituted off at the minute indicated, and player was substituted on at the same time (c) – captain Sorted by minutes played
#	NumberOfGoals.goalNumber scored by the player in the match (alternate notation to Goal in match)
Min	The minute in the match the goal was scored. For list that include caps, blank indicates played in the match but did not score a goal.
Assist/pass	The ball was passed by the player, which assisted in scoring the goal. This column depends on the availability and source of this information.
penalty or pk	Goal scored on penalty-kick which was awarded due to foul by opponent. (Goals scored in penalty-shoot-out, at the end of a tied match after extra-time, are not included.)
Score	The match score after the goal was scored. Sorted by goal difference, then by goal scored by the player's team
Result	The final score. Sorted by goal difference in the match, then by goal difference in penalty-shoot-out if it is taken, followed by goal scored by the player's team in the match, then by goal scored in the penalty-shoot-out. For matches with identical final scores, match ending in extra-time without penalty-shoot-out is a tougher match, therefore precede matches that ended in regulation
aet	The score at the end of extra-time; the match was tied at the end of 90' regulation
pso	Penalty-shoot-out score shown in parentheses; the match was tied at the end of extra-time
	Green background color – exhibition or closed door international friendly match
	Yellow background color – match at an invitational tournament
	Orange background color – Continental Games or regional tournament
NOTE on background colors: Continental Games or regional tournament are sometimes also qualifier for World Cup or Olympics; information depends on the source such as the player's federation. NOTE: some keys may not apply for a particular football player

	Date	Location	Opponent	Lineup	#	Min	Score	Result	Competition
1	2009-03-09	Silves	Iceland	off 81' (on Madsen)	1.1	36	1–0	2–0	Algarve Cup
2	2010-03-01 (Note: "Danmark – Finland 2 – 1". dbu.dk.)	Albufeira	Finland	on 65' (off Munk)	1.1	80	2–1	2–1	Algarve Cup
3	2012-09-15	Vejle	Czech Republic	off 87' (on Troelsgaard)	1.1	55	1–0	1–0	UEFA Championship qualifier
4	2012-06-20	St. Pölten	Austria	Start	1.1	92	1–3	1–3	UEFA Championship qualifier
5	2013-06-20	Viborg	Iceland	off 45' (on Jensen)	1.1	34	1–0	2–0	Friendly
6	2013-11-24	Valletta	Malta	Start	2.1	26	2–0	5–0	Friendly
7	2013-11-24	Valletta	Malta	Start	2.2	46	4–0	5–0	Friendly
8	2014-03-20	Albufeira	United States	Start	1.1	35	2–0	5–3	Algarve Cup
9	2014-09-13	Vejle	Malta	Start	2.1	28	4–0	8–0	World Cup qualifier
10	2014-09-13	Vejle	Malta	Start	2.2	67	7–0	8–0	World Cup qualifier
11	2015-10-22	Viborg	Moldova	Start	2.1	52	3–0	4–0	UEFA Championship qualifier
12	2015-10-22	Viborg	Moldova	Start	2.2	89	4–0	4–0	UEFA Championship qualifier
13	2016-03-02	Albufeira	Canada	Start	1.1	55	1–0	1–0	Algarve Cup
14	2016-03-04	Albufeira	Iceland	Start	1.1	53	1–2	1–4	Algarve Cup
15	2016-06-02	Viborg	Slovakia	on 46' (off Larsen)	2.1	49	2–0	4–0	UEFA Championship qualifier
16	2016-06-02	Viborg	Slovakia	on 46' (off Larsen)	2.2	60	3–0	4–0	UEFA Championship qualifier
17	2016-09-15	Chișinău	Moldova	Start	2.1	3	1–0	5–0	UEFA Championship qualifier
18	2016-09-15	Chișinău	Moldova	Start	2.2	68	4–0	5–0	UEFA Championship qualifier
19	2016-09-20	Viborg	Sweden	Start	1.1	47	2–0	2–0	UEFA Championship qualifier
20	2017-07-30	Rotterdam	Germany	Start	1.1	49	1–1	2–1	UEFA Championship
21	2017-08-06	Enschede	Netherlands	Start	1.1	6	1–0	2–4	UEFA Championship Final
22	2017-09-19	Győr	Hungary	off 83' (on Sørensen)	1.1	28	1–0	6–1	World Cup qualifier
23	2018-01-22	San Diego	United States	Start	1.1	14	1–0	1–5	Friendly
24	2018-06-08	Lviv	Ukraine	off 86' (on Smidt Nielsen)	2.1	6	1–0	5–1	World Cup qualifier
25	2018-06-08	Lviv	Ukraine	off 86' (on Smidt Nielsen)	2.2	52	3–0	5–1	World Cup qualifier
26	2018-06-12	Viborg	Hungary	Start	2.1	44	1–1	5–1	World Cup qualifier
27	2018-06-12	Viborg	Hungary	Start	2.2	45	2–1	5–1	World Cup qualifier
28	2018-08-30	Viborg	Croatia	Start	1.1	90+2	1–1	1–1	World Cup qualifier
29	2018-10-09	Viborg	Netherlands	Start	1.1	5	1–0	1–2	World Cup qualifier play-offs
30	2019-02-27	Algarve	Norway	off 87' (on Bruun)	1.1	18	1–0	1–2	Algarve Cup
31	2019-09-03	Ramat Gan	Israel	off 82' (on Madsen)	1.1	80	2–0	3–0	UEFA Championship qualifier
32	2019-11-12	Viborg	Georgia	off 62' (on Madsen)	3.1	4	1–0	14–0	UEFA Championship qualifier
–	2019-11-12	Viborg	Georgia	off 62' (on Madsen)	3.2	26 (Note: UEFA recorded the goal for Nadim, meanwhile the DBU recorded it as an own goal by Nino Sutidze.)	4–0	14–0	UEFA Championship qualifier
33	2019-11-12	Viborg	Georgia	off 62' (on Madsen)	3.3	36	8–0	14–0	UEFA Championship qualifier
34	2020-09-17	Zenica	Bosnia and Herzegovina	Start	1.1	37	1–0	4–0	UEFA Championship qualifier
35	2020-09-22	Ta' Qali	Malta	off 66' (on Bruun)	2.1	7	2–0	8–0	UEFA Championship qualifier
36	2020-09-22	Ta' Qali	Malta	off 66' (on Bruun)	2.2	42	3–0	8–0	UEFA Championship qualifier
37	2020-10-27	Empoli	Italy	off 72' (on Bruun)	2.1	17	2–0	3–1	UEFA Championship qualifier
38	2020-10-27	Empoli	Italy	off 72' (on Bruun)	2.2	47	3–0	3–1	UEFA Championship qualifier

== Honours ==
Portland Thorns FC

- NWSL Shield: 2016
- NWSL Championship: 2017

Manchester City

- FA WSL runners-up: 2017–18

Paris Saint-Germain

- Division 1 Féminine: 2020–21

Racing Louisville FC

- NWSL Challenge Cup runners-up: 2023
- All-time highest goal scorer

HB Køge

- A-Liga: 2025–26
- Danish Cup: 2025–26

Denmark

- UEFA Women's Euro runners-up: 2017

Individual

- Portland Thorns 2016 top goalscorer

=== Awards and recognition ===
In the 2010 Danish Cup she was named player of the tournament. In July 2019, Nadia Nadim was named UNESCO Champion for Girls and Women's Education. She received this recognition for her role in promoting sport and gender equality, her contribution to the Organization's educational action prioritizing young people and advocacy for girls and women's education at an international scale, among others.
