= 2019 FIFA Women's World Cup qualification (UEFA) =

Tournament details
- Dates: 6 April 2017 – 13 November 2018
- Teams: 46 (from 1 confederation)

Tournament statistics
- Matches played: 169
- Goals scored: 575 (3.4 per match)
- Top scorer(s): (Belgium) Janice Cayman (10 goals)

The European qualifying competition for the 2019 FIFA Women's World Cup was a women's football competition that determined the eight UEFA teams joining the automatically qualified hosts France in the final tournament.

Apart from France, 46 of the remaining 54 UEFA member national teams entered the qualifying competition, with Andorra making their World Cup qualification debut and Kosovo making their competitive debut.

== Format ==
The qualifying competition consisted of three rounds:

- Preliminary round: The 16 lowest-ranked teams were drawn into four groups of four teams. Each group was played in single round-robin format at the venues of one of the teams which were pre-selected as hosts. The four group winners and the best runners-up (not counting results against the fourth-placed team) advance to the qualifying group stage.
- Qualifying group stage: The 35 teams (30 highest-ranked teams and five preliminary round qualifiers) were drawn into seven groups of five teams. Each group was played in home-and-away round-robin format. The seven group winners qualify directly for the final tournament, while the four best runners-up (not counting results against the fifth-placed team) advance to the play-offs.
- Play-offs: The four teams play two knockout rounds of home-and-away two-legged matches to determine the last qualified team from UEFA.

=== Tiebreakers ===
In the preliminary round and qualifying group stage, teams were ranked according to points (3 points for a win, 1 point for a draw, 0 points for a loss), and if tied on points, the following tiebreaking criteria were applied, in the order given, to determine the rankings (Regulations Articles 13.01, 13.02, and 15.01):

1. Points in head-to-head matches among tied teams;
2. Goal difference in head-to-head matches among tied teams;
3. Goals scored in head-to-head matches among tied teams;
4. (Qualifying group stage only) Away goals scored in head-to-head matches among tied teams;
5. If more than two teams were tied, and after applying all head-to-head criteria above, a subset of teams was still tied, all head-to-head criteria above were reapplied exclusively to this subset of teams;
6. Goal difference in all group matches;
7. Goals scored in all group matches;
8. (Qualifying group stage only) Away goals scored in all group matches;
9. (Preliminary round only) Penalty shoot-out if only two teams have the same number of points, and they met in the last round of the group and were tied after applying all criteria above (not used if more than two teams have the same number of points, or if their rankings were not relevant for qualification for the next stage);
10. Disciplinary points (red card = 3 points, yellow card = 1 point, expulsion for two yellow cards in one match = 3 points);
11. UEFA coefficient for the preliminary round or qualifying group stage draw.

To determine the best runner-up from the preliminary round and the four best runners-up from the qualifying group stage, the results against the teams in last place (fourth place in preliminary round and fifth place in qualifying group stage) were discarded. The following criteria were applied (Regulations Articles 13.03 and 15.02):

1. Points;
2. Goal difference;
3. Goals scored;
4. (Qualifying group stage only) Away goals scored;
5. Disciplinary points;
6. UEFA coefficient for the preliminary round or qualifying group stage draw.

In the play-offs, the team that scored more goals on aggregate over the two legs qualified for the final tournament. If the aggregate score was level, the away goals rule was applied, i.e., the team that scored more goals away from home over the two legs advances. If away goals were also equal, extra time was played. The away goals rule was again applied after extra time, i.e., if there were goals scored during extra time and the aggregate score was still level, the visiting team advances by virtue of more away goals scored. If no goals were scored during extra time, the tie was decided by penalty shoot-out (Regulations Article 17.01).

== Schedule ==
The qualifying matches were played on dates that fell within the FIFA Women's International Match Calendar.

Stage	FIFA International Dates
Preliminary round	6–11 April 2017
Qualifying group stage	11–19 September 2017
Qualifying group stage	16–24 October 2017
Qualifying group stage	20–28 November 2017
Qualifying group stage	15–23 January 2018
Qualifying group stage	26 February – 6 March 2018
Qualifying group stage	2–10 April 2018
Qualifying group stage	4–12 June 2018
Qualifying group stage	27 August – 4 September 2018
Play-offs	1–9 October 2018
Play-offs	5–13 November 2018

== Entrants ==
The teams were ranked according to their coefficient ranking, calculated based on the following:

- UEFA Women's Euro 2013 final tournament and qualifying competition (20%)
- 2015 FIFA Women's World Cup final tournament and qualifying competition (40%)
- UEFA Women's Euro 2017 qualifying competition (40%)

The 30 highest-ranked teams entered the qualifying group stage, while the 16 lowest-ranked teams entered the preliminary round. The coefficient ranking was also used for seeding in the preliminary round and qualifying group stage draws.

Final tournament hosts
Team	Coeff	Rank
**France**	42,355	2

**Teams entering qualifying group stage**

Team	Coeff	Rank
**Germany**	42,957	1
**England**	39,880	3
**Norway**	39,161	4
**Sweden**	38,036	5
**Spain**	37,655	6
Switzerland	36,629	7
**Italy**	34,775	8
**Netherlands**	34,642	9
Iceland	34,141	10
**Scotland**	33,632	11
Denmark	32,915	12
Austria	31,882	13
Belgium	31,213	14
Russia	30,367	15
Finland	29,815	16

Team	Coeff	Rank
Ukraine	28,579	17
Wales	25,807	18
Romania	25,602	19
Poland	24,832	20
Czech Republic	23,874	21
Republic of Ireland	23,669	22
Portugal	22,860	23
Serbia	21,579	24
Hungary	20,362	25
Bosnia and Herzegovina	19,546	26
Belarus	19,434	27
Slovakia	18,104	28
Slovenia	17,224	29
Northern Ireland	17,051	30
Croatia	16,266	31

**Teams entering preliminary round**

Team	Coeff	Rank
Turkey	15,656	32
Israel	14,641	33
Greece	13,961	34
Kazakhstan	13,350	35
Estonia	11,151	36
Albania	9,121	37
Faroe Islands	8,020	38
Moldova	7,910	39
Malta	7,208	42
Montenegro	7,191	44
Georgia	6,316	45
Lithuania	4,818	46
Latvia	4,584	47
Luxembourg	4,109	48
Andorra	1,793	49
Kosovo	—	—

Notes

- Teams marked in **bold** qualified for the World Cup.

Did not enter
Team	Coeff	Rank
Bulgaria	7,817	40
North Macedonia	7,768	41
Armenia	7,194	43
Azerbaijan	—	—
Cyprus	—	—
Gibraltar	—	—
Liechtenstein	—	—
San Marino	—	—

== Preliminary round ==
=== Draw ===
The draw for the preliminary round was held on 19 January 2017, 13:30 CET (UTC+1), at the UEFA headquarters in Nyon, Switzerland.

The 16 teams were allocated into four seeding positions according to their coefficient ranking. They were drawn into four groups of four containing one team from each of the four seeding positions. First, the four teams which were pre-selected as hosts were drawn from their own designated pot and allocated to their respective group as per their seeding positions. Next, the remaining 12 teams were drawn from their respective pot which were allocated according to their seeding positions.

Seeding position 1
Team	Coeff	Rank
Turkey	15,656	32
**Israel**	14,641	33
Greece	13,961	34
**Kazakhstan**	13,350	35

Seeding position 2
Team	Coeff	Rank
Estonia	11,151	36
**Albania (H)**	9,121	37
**Faroe Islands (H)**	8,020	38
**Moldova**	7,910	39

Seeding position 3
Team	Coeff	Rank
Malta	7,208	42
Montenegro	7,191	44
Georgia **(H)**	6,316	45
Lithuania **(H)**	4,818	46

Seeding position 4
Team	Coeff	Rank
Latvia	4,584	47
Luxembourg	4,109	48
Andorra	1,793	49
Kosovo	—	—

Notes

- Teams which were pre-selected as preliminary round hosts were denoted by **(H)**.
- Teams marked in **bold** advanced from preliminary round to qualifying group stage.

=== Groups ===
The four group winners and the best runner-up (not counting results against the fourth-placed team) advance to the qualifying group stage to join the 30 direct entrants.

==== Group 1 ====
Pos	Team	Pld	W	D	L	GF	GA	GD	Pts	Qualification	Kazakhstan	Latvia	Georgia	Estonia
1	Kazakhstan	3	2	1	0	4	2	+2	**7**	Qualifying group stage	—	2–2	1–0	—
2	Latvia	3	1	2	0	7	3	+4	**5**		—	—	1–1	—
3	Georgia (H)	3	1	1	1	3	3	0	**4**		—	—	—	2–1
4	Estonia	3	0	0	3	1	7	−6	**0**		0–1	0–4	—	—

Source: UEFA
(H) Hosts

==== Group 2 ====
Pos	Team	Pld	W	D	L	GF	GA	GD	Pts	Qualification	Albania	Greece	Malta	Kosovo
1	Albania (H)	3	2	1	0	5	3	+2	**7**	Qualifying group stage	—	2–1	—	3–2
2	Greece	3	2	0	1	8	2	+6	**6**		—	—	1–0	6–0
3	Malta	3	1	1	1	3	2	+1	**4**		0–0	—	—	—
4	Kosovo	3	0	0	3	3	12	−9	**0**		—	—	1–3	—

Source: UEFA
(H) Hosts

==== Group 3 ====
Pos	Team	Pld	W	D	L	GF	GA	GD	Pts	Qualification	Israel	Moldova	Lithuania	Andorra
1	Israel	3	2	1	0	9	0	+9	**7**	Qualifying group stage	—	—	2–0	7–0
2	Moldova	3	2	1	0	6	0	+6	**7**	Qualifying group stage	0–0	—	—	4–0
3	Lithuania (H)	3	1	0	2	2	4	−2	**3**		—	0–2	—	—
4	Andorra	3	0	0	3	0	13	−13	**0**		—	—	0–2	—

Source: UEFA
(H) Hosts

==== Group 4 ====
Pos	Team	Pld	W	D	L	GF	GA	GD	Pts	Qualification	Faroe Islands	Turkey	Montenegro	Luxembourg
1	Faroe Islands (H)	3	3	0	0	9	3	+6	**9**	Qualifying group stage	—	2–1	—	5–1
2	Turkey	3	2	0	1	13	3	+10	**6**		—	—	3–0	9–1
3	Montenegro	3	1	0	2	8	6	+2	**3**		1–2	—	—	—
4	Luxembourg	3	0	0	3	3	21	−18	**0**		—	—	1–7	—

Source: UEFA
(H) Hosts

=== Ranking of second-placed teams ===
To determine the best second-placed teams from the preliminary round which advance to the qualifying group stage, only the results of the second-placed teams against the first and third-placed teams in their group were taken into account, while results against the fourth-placed team were not included. As a result, two matches played by each second-placed team were counted for the purposes of determining the ranking.

Pos	Grp	Team	Pld	W	D	L	GF	GA	GD	Pts	Qualification
1	**3**	Moldova	2	1	1	0	2	0	+2	**4**	Qualifying group stage
2	**4**	Turkey	2	1	0	1	4	2	+2	**3**	
3	**2**	Greece	2	1	0	1	2	2	0	**3**	
4	**1**	Latvia	2	0	2	0	3	3	0	**2**	

Source: UEFA
Rules for classification: 1) points; 2) goal difference; 3) goals scored; 4) disciplinary points; 5) coefficient.

== Qualifying group stage ==
=== Draw ===
The draw for the qualifying group stage was held on 25 April 2017, 13:30 CEST (UTC+2), at the UEFA headquarters in Nyon, Switzerland.

The 35 teams were allocated into five seeding pots according to their coefficient ranking, with the five preliminary round qualifiers placed in Pot E. They were drawn into seven groups of five containing one team from each of the five seeding pots. For political reasons, Russia and Ukraine would not be drawn in the same group.

Pot A
Team	Coeff	Rank
**Germany**	42,957	1
**England**	39,880	3
**Norway**	39,161	4
**Sweden**	38,036	5
**Spain**	37,655	6
Switzerland	36,629	7
**Italy**	34,775	8

Pot B
Team	Coeff	Rank
Netherlands	34,642	9
Iceland	34,141	10
**Scotland**	33,632	11
Denmark	32,915	12
Austria	31,882	13
Belgium	31,213	14
Russia	30,367	15

Pot C
Team	Coeff	Rank
Finland	29,815	16
Ukraine	28,579	17
Wales	25,807	18
Romania	25,602	19
Poland	24,832	20
Czech Republic	23,874	21
Republic of Ireland	23,669	22

Pot D
Team	Coeff	Rank
Portugal	22,860	23
Serbia	21,579	24
Hungary	20,362	25
Bosnia and Herzegovina	19,546	26
Belarus	19,434	27
Slovakia	18,104	28
Slovenia	17,224	29

Pot E
Team	Coeff	Rank
Northern Ireland	17,051	30
Croatia	16,266	31
Israel **(P)**	14,641	33
Kazakhstan **(P)**	13,350	35
Albania **(P)**	9,121	37
Faroe Islands **(P)**	8,020	38
Moldova **(P)**	7,910	39

Notes

- Teams marked in **bold** qualified for the final tournament as group winners.
- Teams marked in italics advanced to the play-offs as four best runners-up.
- Teams which advanced from preliminary round to qualifying group stage were denoted by **(P)**.

=== Groups ===
The seven group winners qualify directly for the 2019 FIFA Women's World Cup.
The four best group runners-up (not counting results against fifth-placed team) advance to the play-offs.

==== Group 1 ====
Pos	Team	Pld	W	D	L	GF	GA	GD	Pts	Qualification	England	Wales	Russia	Bosnia and Herzegovina	Kazakhstan
1	England	8	7	1	0	29	1	+28	**22**	2019 FIFA Women's World Cup	—	0–0	6–0	4–0	5–0
2	Wales	8	5	2	1	7	3	+4	**17**		0–3	—	3–0	1–0	1–0
3	Russia	8	4	1	3	16	13	+3	**13**		1–3	0–0	—	3–0	3–0
4	Bosnia and Herzegovina	8	1	0	7	3	19	−16	**3 (Note: Head-to-head results: Kazakhstan 0–2 Bosnia and Herzegovina, Bosnia and Herzegovina 0–2 Kazakhstan (tied on head-to-head results, ranked on total goal difference).)**		0–2	0–1	1–6	—	0–2
5	Kazakhstan	8	1	0	7	2	21	−19	**3**		0–6	0–1	0–3	0–2	—

Source: UEFA

==== Group 2 ====
Pos	Team	Pld	W	D	L	GF	GA	GD	Pts	Qualification	Scotland	Switzerland	Poland	Albania	Belarus
1	Scotland	8	7	0	1	19	7	+12	**21**	2019 FIFA Women's World Cup	—	2–1	3–0	5–0	2–1
2	Switzerland	8	6	1	1	21	5	+16	**19**	Play-offs	1–0	—	2–1	5–1	3–0
3	Poland	8	3	2	3	16	12	+4	**11**		2–3	0–0	—	1–1	4–1
4	Albania	8	1	1	6	6	22	−16	**4**		1–2	1–4	1–4	—	1–0
5	Belarus	8	1	0	7	5	21	−16	**3**		1–2	0–5	1–4	1–0	—

Source: UEFA

==== Group 3 ====
Pos	Team	Pld	W	D	L	GF	GA	GD	Pts	Qualification	Norway	Netherlands	Ireland		Slovakia
1	Norway	8	7	0	1	22	4	+18	**21**	2019 FIFA Women's World Cup	—	2–1	1–0	4–1	6–1
2	Netherlands	8	6	1	1	22	2	+20	**19**	Play-offs	1–0	—	0–0	7–0	1–0
3	Republic of Ireland	8	4	1	3	10	6	+4	**13**		0–2	0–2	—	4–0	2–1
4	Northern Ireland	8	1	0	7	4	27	−23	**3 (Note: Head-to-head results: Slovakia 1–3 Northern Ireland, Northern Ireland 0–1 Slovakia.)**		0–3	0–5	0–2	—	0–1
5	Slovakia	8	1	0	7	4	23	−19	**3**		0–4	0–5	0–2	1–3	—

Source: UEFA

==== Group 4 ====
Pos	Team	Pld	W	D	L	GF	GA	GD	Pts	Qualification	Sweden	Denmark	Ukraine	Hungary	Croatia
1	Sweden	8	7	0	1	22	2	+20	**21**	2019 FIFA Women's World Cup	—	3–0 (Note: The Sweden v Denmark match was scheduled for 20 October 2017, but was cancelled because of a disagreement between the Danish team and their federation. On 16 November it was announced that the result was awarded 3–0 to Sweden.)	3–0	5–0	4–0
2	Denmark	8	5	1	2	22	8	+14	**16**	Play-offs	0–1	—	1–0	5–1	1–1
3	Ukraine	8	4	1	3	9	10	−1	**13**		1–0	1–5	—	2–0	1–1
4	Hungary	8	1	1	6	8	26	−18	**4**		1–4	1–6	0–1	—	2–2
5	Croatia	8	0	3	5	5	20	−15	**3**		0–2	0–4	0–3	1–3	—

Source: UEFA

==== Group 5 ====
Pos	Team	Pld	W	D	L	GF	GA	GD	Pts	Qualification	Germany	Iceland	Czech Republic	Slovenia	Faroe Islands
1	Germany	8	7	0	1	38	3	+35	**21**	2019 FIFA Women's World Cup	—	2–3	4–0	6–0	11–0
2	Iceland	8	5	2	1	22	6	+16	**17**		0–2	—	1–1	2–0	8–0
3	Czech Republic	8	4	2	2	20	8	+12	**14**		0–1	1–1	—	2–0	4–1
4	Slovenia	8	2	0	6	9	20	−11	**6**		0–4	0–2	0–4	—	5–0
5	Faroe Islands	8	0	0	8	1	53	−52	**0**		0–8	0–5	0–8	0–4	—

Source: UEFA

==== Group 6 ====
Pos	Team	Pld	W	D	L	GF	GA	GD	Pts	Qualification	Italy	Belgium	Portugal	Romania	Moldova
1	Italy	8	7	0	1	19	4	+15	**21**	2019 FIFA Women's World Cup	—	2–1	3–0	3–0	5–0
2	Belgium	8	6	1	1	28	6	+22	**19**	Play-offs	2–1	—	1–1	3–2	12–0
3	Portugal	8	3	2	3	22	8	+14	**11**		0–1	0–1	—	5–1	8–0
4	Romania	8	1	2	5	7	15	−8	**5**		0–1	0–1	1–1	—	3–1
5	Moldova	8	0	1	7	2	45	−43	**1**		1–3	0–7	0–7	0–0	—

Source: UEFA

==== Group 7 ====
Pos	Team	Pld	W	D	L	GF	GA	GD	Pts	Qualification	Spain	Austria	Finland	Serbia	Israel
1	Spain	8	8	0	0	25	2	+23	**24**	2019 FIFA Women's World Cup	—	4–0	5–1	3–0	2–0
2	Austria	8	5	1	2	19	7	+12	**16**		0–1	—	4–1	1–1	2–0
3	Finland	8	3	1	4	9	13	−4	**10**		0–2	0–2	—	1–0	4–0
4	Serbia	8	2	1	5	5	13	−8	**7**		1–2	0–4	0–2	—	2–0
5	Israel	8	0	1	7	0	23	−23	**1**		0–6	0–6	0–0	0–1	—

Source: UEFA

=== Ranking of second-placed teams ===
To determine the four best second-placed teams from the qualifying group stage which advanced to the play-offs, only the results of the second-placed teams against the first, third and fourth-placed teams in their group were taken into account, while results against the fifth-placed team were not included. As a result, six matches played by each second-placed team were counted for the purposes of determining the ranking.

Pos	Grp	Team	Pld	W	D	L	GF	GA	GD	Pts	Qualification
1	3	Netherlands	6	4	1	1	16	2	+14	13	Play-offs
2	2	Switzerland	6	4	1	1	13	5	+8	13	Play-offs
3	6	Belgium	6	4	1	1	9	6	+3	13	Play-offs
4	4	Denmark	6	4	0	2	17	7	+10	12	Play-offs
5	5	Iceland	6	3	2	1	9	6	+3	11	
6	1	Wales	6	3	2	1	5	3	+2	11	
7	7	Austria	6	3	1	2	11	7	+4	10	

Source: UEFA
Rules for classification: 1) points; 2) goal difference; 3) goals scored; 4) away goals scored; 5) disciplinary points; 6) coefficient.

== Play-offs ==
=== Draw ===
The draw for the play-offs was held on 7 September 2018, 14:00 CEST (UTC+2), at the UEFA headquarters in Nyon, Switzerland. The four teams were drawn into two knockout rounds (semi-finals and final) of home-and-away two-legged format.

For the semi-finals, two teams were seeded and two teams were unseeded, based on their latest coefficient ranking after the completion of the qualifying group stage, calculated based on the following:

- 2015 FIFA Women's World Cup final tournament and qualifying competition (20%)
- UEFA Women's Euro 2017 qualifying competition (40%)
- 2019 FIFA Women's World Cup qualifying competition (preliminary round and group stage) (40%)

Seeded
Team	Coeff	Rank
Netherlands	39,430	4
Switzerland	37,031	6

Unseeded
Team	Coeff	Rank
Denmark	34,185	11
Belgium	32,738	13

For each semi-final, a seeded team was drawn against an unseeded team, with the order of legs decided by draw. A draw was also held for the final between the two winners of the semi-finals to decide the order of legs.

=== Matches ===
==== Play-off semi-finals ====
Team 1	Agg.	Team 2	1st leg	2nd leg
Netherlands	4–1	Denmark	2–0	2–1
Belgium	3–3 (a)	Switzerland	2–2	1–1

==== Play-off final ====
The winner Netherlands qualifies for the 2019 FIFA Women's World Cup.

Team 1	Agg.	Team 2	1st leg	2nd leg
Netherlands	4–1	Switzerland	3–0	1–1

== Qualified teams ==
The following nine teams from UEFA qualified for the final tournament, including France which qualified as hosts.

Team	Qualified as	Qualified on	Previous appearances in FIFA Women's World Cup^{1}
France	Hosts	19 March 2015	3 (2003, 2011, 2015)
England	Group 1 winners	31 August 2018	4 (1995, 2007, 2011, 2015)
Scotland	Group 2 winners	4 September 2018	0 (debut)
Norway	Group 3 winners	4 September 2018	7 (1991, **1995**, 1999, 2003, 2007, 2011, 2015)
Sweden	Group 4 winners	4 September 2018	7 (1991, 1995, 1999, 2003, 2007, 2011, 2015)
Germany	Group 5 winners	4 September 2018	7 (1991, 1995, 1999, **2003**, **2007**, 2011, 2015)
Italy	Group 6 winners	8 June 2018	2 (1991, 1999)
Spain	Group 7 winners	8 June 2018	1 (2015)
Netherlands	Play-off winners	13 November 2018	1 (2015)

^{1} Bold indicates champions for that year. Italic indicates hosts for that year.

== Top goalscorers ==
There were 575 goals scored in 169 matches, for an average of 3.4 goals per match.

10 goals

- (Belgium) Janice Cayman

7 goals

- (Denmark) Nadia Nadim
- (Italy) Cristiana Girelli
- (Netherlands) Vivianne Miedema
- (Norway) Lisa-Marie Karlseng Utland
- (Spain) Jennifer Hermoso

6 goals

- (Denmark) Sanne Troelsgaard Nielsen
- (England) Nikita Parris
- (Germany) Alexandra Popp
- (Germany) Lea Schüller
- (Netherlands) Sherida Spitse
- (Norway) Caroline Graham Hansen
- (Russia) Elena Danilova
- (Russia) Nadezhda Smirnova
- (Switzerland) Lara Dickenmann

Source: UEFA.com

For full lists of goalscorers, see sections in each group:

- Preliminary round
- Group 1
- Group 2
- Group 3
- Group 4
- Group 5
- Group 6
- Group 7
- Play-offs
