= Isah =

Isah is both a given name and a surname. Notable people with the name include:

== Given name ==
- Isah Umoru Akor (born 1991), Nigerian footballer
- Isah Aliyu (born 1999), Nigerian footballer
- Isah Eliakwu (born 1985), Nigerian footballer
- Isah Mohammad (born 1987), Nigerian taekwondo practitioner
- Isah Salihu (born 1991), Nigerian sprinter

== Surname ==
- Ahmed Isah, Nigerian activist and radio personality
- Jibrin Isah (born 1960), Nigerian politician and banker
- Musa Isah (born 2000), Nigerian-born Bahraini athlete
- Mustapha Isah (born 2004), Nigerian footballer
