= FIFA Marta Award =

International football award

The FIFA Marta Award [ˈmaʁtɐ] is an award established in 2024 by the Fédération Internationale de Football Association (FIFA) to be awarded to the women's association football player judged to have scored the most aesthetically significant, or "most beautiful", goal of the calendar year. The Marta Award is announced yearly and is considered by voting.

The award is named in honour of Marta, the forward and captain of the Brazil women's national team for over two decades from 2002 until 2024.

The time-frame for the first award was August 2023 to August 2024. The annual award was presented for the first time during The Best FIFA Football Awards 2024 Gala on 17 December 2024; Marta herself won the inaugural award.

== Winners and nominees ==
Scores and results list the player's club goal tally first.

=== 2024 ===
FIFA announced the list of 11 nominees on 28 November 2024.

Rank	Player	Team	Opponent	Score	Competition	Points
1st	(Brazil) Marta	Brazil	Jamaica	4–0	International friendly	22
2nd	(Nigeria) Asisat Oshoala	(Spain) Barcelona	(Portugal) Benfica	5–0	2023–24 UEFA Women's Champions League	20
3rd	(France) Sakina Karchaoui	France	Sweden	1–0	UEFA Women's Euro 2025 qualifying	16
4th	(Italy) Giuseppina Moraca	(Italy) Lazio	(Italy) Bologna	2–0	2023–24 Serie B	15
5th	(Mexico) Mayra Pelayo-Bernal	Mexico	United States	2–0	2024 CONCACAF W Gold Cup	12
6th	(Germany) Paulina Krumbiegel	(Germany) TSG Hoffenheim	(Germany) MSV Duisburg	2–0	2023–24 Frauen-Bundesliga	12
7th	(France) Delphine Cascarino	(France) Lyon	(Portugal) Benfica	2–1	2023–24 UEFA Women's Champions League	10
8th	(England) Beth Mead	(England) Arsenal	(England) West Ham United	2–0	2023–24 Women's Super League	9
9th	(Germany) Marina Hegering	(Germany) VfL Wolfsburg	(Germany) SGS Essen	2–1	2023–24 Frauen-Bundesliga	9
10th	(United States) Trinity Rodman	United States	Japan	1–0	2024 Summer Olympics	9
11th	(Serbia) Nina Matejić	Serbia	England	1–0	2024 UEFA Women's Under-19 Championship	6

=== 2025 ===
FIFA announced the list of 11 nominees on 13 November 2025.

Rank	Player	Team	Opponent	Score	Competition	Points
1st	(Mexico) Lizbeth Ovalle	(Mexico) UANL	(Mexico) Guadalajara	1–0	Liga MX Femenil Clausura 2025	24
2nd	(Brazil) Marta	(United States) Orlando Pride	(United States) Kansas City Current	3–1	2024 National Women's Soccer League	20
3rd	(Spain) Mariona Caldentey	(England) Arsenal	(France) Lyon	2–0	2024–25 UEFA Women's Champions League	17
Unranked	(United States) Jordyn Bugg	(United States) Seattle Reign FC	(United States) North Carolina Courage	1–0	2025 National Women's Soccer League	N/A
Unranked	(England) Ashley Cheatley	(England) Brentford	(England) Ascot United	1–0	2024–25 Women's FA Cup	N/A
Unranked	(Australia) Kyra Cooney-Cross	Australia	Germany	1–1	International friendly	N/A
Unranked	(North Korea) Jon Ryong-jong	North Korea	Argentina	2–0	2024 FIFA U-20 Women's World Cup	N/A
Unranked	(Netherlands) Vivianne Miedema	Netherlands	Wales	1–0	UEFA Women's Euro 2025	N/A
Unranked	(Argentina) Kishi Núñez	Argentina	Costa Rica	1–0	2024 FIFA U-20 Women's World Cup	N/A
Unranked	(United States) Ally Sentnor	United States	Colombia	2–0	2025 SheBelieves Cup	N/A
Unranked	(Jamaica) Khadija Shaw	(England) Manchester City	(Sweden) Hammarby	2–1	2024–25 UEFA Women's Champions League	N/A

== Female FIFA Puskás Award nominees (2009–2023) ==
Before 2024, the award for the best goal was combined with that for men's football in the FIFA Puskás Award, with Heather O'Reilly becoming the first female nominee in 2011. No woman won the award, with Stephanie Zambra (née Roche) achieving the best placement by a women's player by ranking second in 2014 behind James Rodriguez. Daniuska Rodríguez and Deyna Castellanos ranked third in 2016 and 2017 respectively. Caroline Weir is the only women's player to receive multiple nominations for the Puskás Award, and one of only eight players to have been so at the time of the Marta Award's inception.

Female FIFA Puskás Award nominees

Year	Rank	Player	Team	Opponent	Score	Competition	Ref.
2011	Unranked	(United States) Heather O'Reilly	United States	Colombia	1–0	2011 FIFA Women's World Cup	
2012	Unranked	(Mexico) Olivia Jiménez	Mexico	Switzerland	2–0	2012 FIFA U-20 Women's World Cup	
2013	Unranked	(France) Louisa Cadamuro	(France) Lyon	(France) Saint-Étienne	5–0	2012–13 Division 1 Féminine	
2013	Unranked	(Australia) Lisa De Vanna	(United States) Sky Blue	(United States) Boston Breakers	5–1	2013 National Women's Soccer League	
2014	2nd	(Republic of Ireland) Stephanie Roche	(Republic of Ireland) Peamount United	(Republic of Ireland) Wexford Youths	2–0	2013–14 Women's National League	
2015	Unranked	(United States) Carli Lloyd	United States	Japan	4–0	2015 FIFA Women's World Cup	
2016	3rd	(Venezuela) Daniuska Rodríguez	Venezuela	Colombia	1–0	2016 South American U-17 Women's Championship	
2017	3rd	(Venezuela) Deyna Castellanos	Venezuela	Cameroon	2–1	2016 FIFA U-17 Women's World Cup	
2019	Unranked	(United States) Amy Rodriguez	(United States) Utah Royals FC	(United States) Sky Blue FC	1–0	2019 National Women's Soccer League	
2019	Unranked	(Northern Ireland) Billie Simpson	(Northern Ireland) Cliftonville Ladies	(Northern Ireland) Sion Swifts Ladies	1–2	2018 Women's Premiership	
2019	Unranked	(Cameroon) Ajara Nchout	Cameroon	New Zealand	2–1	2019 FIFA Women's World Cup	
2020	Unranked	(Costa Rica) Shirley Cruz	Costa Rica	Panama	3–1	2020 CONCACAF Women's Olympic Qualifying Championship	
2020	Unranked	(Wales) Sophie Ingle	(England) Chelsea	(England) Arsenal	3–0	2019–20 FA WSL	
2020	Unranked	(Scotland) Caroline Weir	(England) Manchester City	(England) Manchester United	1–0	2019–20 FA WSL	
2021	Unranked	(Ghana) Sandra Owusu-Ansah	(Ghana) Supreme Ladies	(Ghana) Kumasi Sports Academy Ladies	1–1	2020–21 Ghana Women's Premier League	
2021	Unranked	(Mexico) Daniela Sánchez	(Mexico) Querétaro	(Mexico) Atlético San Luis	3–2	Liga MX Femenil Guardianes 2021	
2021	Unranked	(Scotland) Caroline Weir	(England) Manchester City	(England) Manchester United	3–0	2020–21 FA WSL	
2022	Unranked	(France) Amandine Henry	(France) Lyon	(Spain) Barcelona	1–0	2021–22 UEFA Women's Champions League	
2022	Unranked	(Spain) Salma Paralluelo	(Spain) Villarreal	(Spain) Barcelona	1–0	2021–22 Liga F	
2022	Unranked	(England) Alessia Russo	England	Sweden	3–0	UEFA Women's Euro 2022	
2023	Unranked	(Colombia) Linda Caicedo	Colombia	Germany	1–0	2023 FIFA Women's World Cup	
2023	Unranked	(Brazil) Bia Zaneratto	Brazil	Panama	3–0	2023 FIFA Women's World Cup	
2023	Unranked	(Australia) Sam Kerr	Australia	England	1–1	2023 FIFA Women's World Cup	

== See also ==
- FIFA Puskás Award
- The Best FIFA Football Awards
