= Sikiru Olatunbosun =

Nigerian footballer (born 1996)

Personal information
- Full name: Sikiru Okanlawon Olatunbosun
- Date of birth: 3 January 1996 (age 30)
- Place of birth: Lagos, Nigeria
- Height: 1.70 m (5 ft 7 in)
- Position: Winger

Team information
- Current team: Arsimi
- Number: 17

Senior career*
| Years | Team | Apps | (Gls) |
| 2013–2018 | MFM F.C. | 82 | (20) |
| 2018–2019 | Plateau United | 11 | (1) |
| 2019–2020 | Menemenspor | 31 | (3) |
| 2021 | Ankaraspor | 16 | (1) |
| 2021–2022 | Smouha | 4 | (0) |
| 2022 | Rivers United | 12 | (1) |
| 2022–2023 | Tuzlaspor | 6 | (0) |
| 2023–2024 | Voska Sport | 15 | (2) |
| 2024–2025 | Iliria Fushë-Krujë | | |
| 2025 | Albanët | | |
| 2025– | Arsimi | 30 | (1) |

International career^{‡}
| 2017– | Nigeria | 3 | (0) |
- * Club domestic league appearances and goals as of 18 June 2026 ‡ National team caps and goals as of 30 June 2020

Sikiru Olatunbosun (born 3 January 1996) is a Nigerian footballer who plays as a winger for Arsimi in the Macedonian First Football League.

== Career ==
=== 2016 season ===
On 15 June 2016, Olatunbosun scored a brace against Nasarawa United at the Agege Stadium which earned him praise. In August 2016 Olatunbosun scored another brace as MFM beat Akwa United 3–0. Olatunbosun latter claimed that he knew he was going to score a brace against Akwa United because the match was on his birthday and he felt he had been empowered by God. Olatunbosun finished the season with 7 goals.

=== 2017 season ===
In the first match of the 2017 season Olatunbosun scored his team's first goal of the season against Niger Tornadoes at the Agege stadium in an eventual 3–0 win. Afterwards Olatunbosun stated that he would be targeting the season's top scorer award.

Goal against Enugu Rangers

On 24 February 2017 in a match against defending champions Enugu Rangers Olatunbosun took down a back-heel flick from teammate Stephen Odey and then improvised with a flick of his own over with his right foot over Rangers defender Emmanuel Etim and although off balance managed to hit an unstoppable left-footed volley into the top corner. The match ended with MFM prevailing 2–1 but Olatunbosun's goal gained widespread attention over the internet and was nominated for the CNN goal of the week award. Only one Nigerian (Kelechi Iheanacho) had ever won the award before for a goal in an international match against Tanzania and no Nigerian Premier League player had ever even been nominated for the award. On 4 March, it was announced that Olatunbosun's goal had indeed won the CNN award gathering more than 80 percent of the vote. Afterwards, Olatunbosun's strike was also widely totted as worthy of the Puskas Award and mentions of it were published in Spanish, Brazilian, French, Italian, and British newspapers. Olatunbosun said afterwards that the goal was because of the grace of God, adding that he hoped that MFM F.C. would qualify for Africa's continental championship at the end of the season.

=== Plateau United ===
In December 2018, Olatunbosun joined Plateau United.

=== Menemenspor ===
On 21 August 2019, Olatunbosun joined Turkish club Menemenspor on a two-year contract.

== International career ==
Olatunbosun was called up as part of a Nigeria XI for the 2014 Expo Unity World Cup, where he scored two goals in the final, a 7-0 thrashing of a Colombia XI. He first represented the full Nigeria national football team in June 2017, coming on as a sub in a friendly against Togo.

== Personal life ==
Olatunbosun was born in Lagos. In his youth Olatunbosun was also a talented baseball player and was part of the local team at Finbas College. He played in baseball tournaments in Burkina Faso and other African countries as well as the national tournament in Abuja before permanently switching to football.
