= The Best FIFA Football Awards 2024 =

International football awards

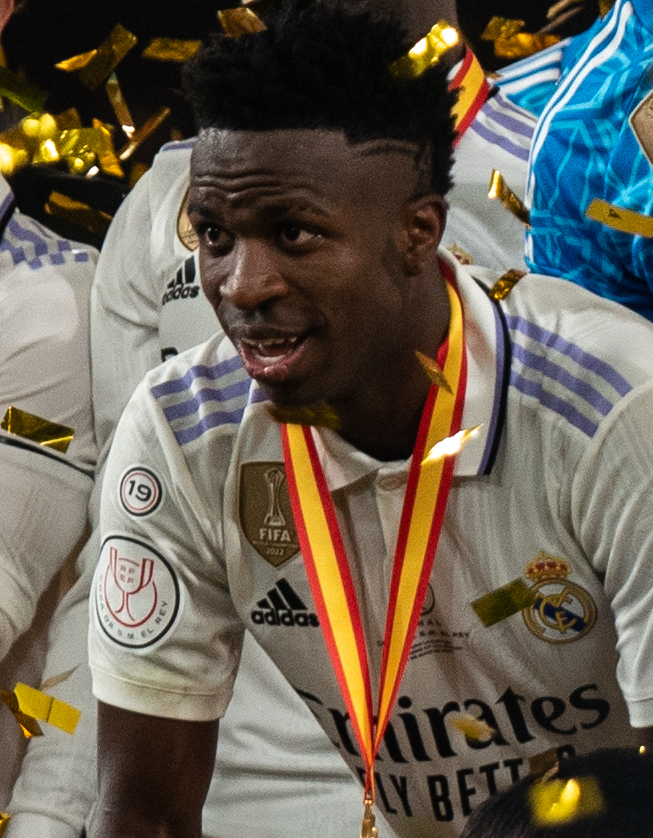
- Vinícius Júnior, The Best FIFA Men's Player 2024
- Date: 17 December 2024
- Presented by: FIFA

Highlights
- The Best FIFA Player: Men's: (Brazil) Vinícius Júnior; Women's: (Spain) Aitana Bonmatí
- The Best FIFA Coach: Men's: (Italy) Carlo Ancelotti; Women's: (England) Emma Hayes
- The Best FIFA Goalkeeper: Men's: (Argentina) Emiliano Martínez; Women's: (United States) Alyssa Naeher
- FIFA Puskás Award: (Argentina) Alejandro Garnacho
- FIFA Marta Award: (Brazil) Marta
- Website: fifa.com

The Best FIFA Football Awards 2024 were held on 17 December 2024. The nominees for all categories were announced on 28 November 2024.

== Changes ==
The FIFA Puskás Award was converted from a mixed award to a men's award with the introduction of the FIFA Marta Award, a women's award for most outstanding goal named after the Brazilian attacker Marta, who also won the inaugural award.

Both Men's and Women's World Best 11 changed format and allocation following the 2024 divestment of the FIFPRO World 11, which had been partnered with FIFA to operate these awards since 2009. Previously, a World Best squad was named by FIFA-FIFPro, with votes selecting the Best 11 from the squad list: the new FIFA Best 11 squads have nomination longlists for each area of the pitch, with votes separating each of the best goalkeeper, defenders, midfielders, and forwards. In total, there were 77 nominees. In terms of allocation, rather than assigning three players for each outfield area and the next most-voted additional outfield player to the Best 11, the new allocation assigns three defenders and midfielders, and two forwards, with the two next most-voted outfield players (though each having to be different positions for a maximum four defenders/midfielders and three forwards) included. Additionally, fan votes form part of the selection for the Best 11 squads, weighted equally with an expert panel.

== Winners and nominees ==
=== The Best FIFA Men's Player ===
Eleven players were initially shortlisted on 28 November 2024. The three finalists were revealed on December 17, 2024.

The selection criteria for the men's players and coaches was: respective achievements during the period from 21 August 2023 to 10 August 2024.

Vinícius Júnior won the award with 48 scoring points.

Rank	Player	Club(s) played for	National team	Points
The finalists
1	Vinícius Júnior	(Spain) Real Madrid	Brazil	48
2	Rodri	(England) Manchester City	Spain	43
3	Jude Bellingham	(Spain) Real Madrid	England	37
Other candidates
4	Dani Carvajal	(Spain) Real Madrid	Spain	31
5	Lamine Yamal	(Spain) Barcelona	Spain	30
6	Lionel Messi	(United States) Inter Miami	Argentina	25
7	Toni Kroos	(Spain) Real Madrid (retired)	Germany	18
8	Erling Haaland	(England) Manchester City	Norway	18
9	Kylian Mbappé	(France) Paris Saint-Germain; (Spain) Real Madrid	France	14
10	Florian Wirtz	(Germany) Bayer Leverkusen	Germany	8
11	Federico Valverde	(Spain) Real Madrid	Uruguay	4

=== The Best FIFA Men's Goalkeeper ===
Seven players were initially shortlisted on 27 November 2024.

The selection criteria for the men's players and coaches was: respective achievements during the period from 21 August 2023 to 10 August 2024.

Emiliano Martínez won the award with 26 scoring points.

Rank	Player	Club(s) played for	National team	Points
The finalists
1	Emiliano Martínez	(England) Aston Villa	Argentina	26
2	Ederson	(England) Manchester City	Brazil	16
3	Unai Simón	(Spain) Athletic Bilbao	Spain	13
Other candidates
4	Andriy Lunin	(Spain) Real Madrid	Ukraine	11
5	David Raya	(England) Arsenal	Spain	5
6	Gianluigi Donnarumma	(France) Paris Saint-Germain	Italy	1
7	Mike Maignan	(Italy) AC Milan	France	0

=== The Best FIFA Men's Coach ===
Five coaches were initially shortlisted on 28 November 2024.

The selection criteria for the men's players and coaches was: respective achievements during the period from 21 August 2023 to 10 August 2024.

Carlo Ancelotti won the award with 26 scoring points.

Rank	Coach	Team(s) managed	Points
The finalists
1	(Italy) Carlo Ancelotti	(Spain) Real Madrid	26
2	(Spain) Xabi Alonso	(Germany) Bayer Leverkusen	22
3	(Spain) Pep Guardiola	(England) Manchester City	10
Other candidates
4	(Spain) Luis de la Fuente	Spain	9
5	(Argentina) Lionel Scaloni	Argentina	5

=== FIFA Puskás Award ===
The eleven players initially shortlisted for the award were announced on 28 November 2024. All goals up for consideration were scored from 21 August 2023 to 10 August 2024.

Alejandro Garnacho won the award with 26 scoring points.

Rank	Player	Match	Competition	Date	Points
1	(Argentina) Alejandro Garnacho	Everton – Manchester United	2023–24 Premier League	26 November 2023	26
2	(Algeria) Yassine Benzia	Algeria – South Africa	2024 FIFA Series	26 March 2024	22
3	(Uganda) Denis Omedi	KCCA – Kitara	2024 Super 8	6 August 2024	16
4	(Ghana) Mohammed Kudus	West Ham United – SC Freiburg	2023–24 UEFA Europa League	14 March 2024	13
5	(Argentina) Walter Bou	Lanús – Tigre	2024 Argentine Primera División	4 August 2024	13
6	(Italy) Federico Dimarco	Inter Milan – Frosinone	2023–24 Serie A	12 November 2023	12
7	(England) Jaden Philogene	Rotherham United – Hull City	2023–24 EFL Championship	13 February 2024	12
8	(Australia) Terry Antonis	Melbourne City – Western Sydney Wanderers	2023–24 A-League	12 March 2024	8
9	(Honduras) Michaell Chirinos	Costa Rica – Honduras	2024 Copa América qualifying play-offs	23 March 2024	7
10	(Qatar) Hassan Al-Haydos	Qatar – China	2023 AFC Asian Cup	21 January 2024	7
11	(Nigeria) Paul Onuachu	Trabzonspor – Konyaspor	2023–24 Süper Lig	10 November 2023	4

=== The Best FIFA Women's Player ===
Sixteen players were initially shortlisted on 28 November 2024.

The selection criteria for the women's players and coaches was: respective achievements during the period from 21 August 2023 to 10 August 2024.

Aitana Bonmatí won the award with 52 scoring points.

Rank	Player	Club(s) played for	National team	Points
The finalists
1	Aitana Bonmatí	(Spain) Barcelona	Spain	52
2	Barbra Banda	(China) Shanghai Shengli; (United States) Orlando Pride	Zambia	39
3	Caroline Graham Hansen	(Spain) Barcelona	Norway	37
Other candidates
4	Lindsey Horan	(France) Lyon	United States	26
5	Lucy Bronze	(Spain) Barcelona; (England) Chelsea	England	23
6	Salma Paralluelo	(Spain) Barcelona	Spain	22
7	Tabitha Chawinga	(France) Paris Saint-Germain; (France) Lyon	Malawi	20
8	Khadija Shaw	(England) Manchester City	Jamaica	19
9	Ona Batlle	(Spain) Barcelona	Spain	19
10	Naomi Girma	(United States) San Diego Wave	United States	9
11	Mariona Caldentey	(Spain) Barcelona; (England) Arsenal	Spain	6
12	Sophia Smith	(United States) Portland Thorns	United States	4
13	Keira Walsh	(Spain) Barcelona	England	1
14	Trinity Rodman	(United States) Washington Spirit	United States	0
15	Mallory Swanson	(United States) Chicago Red Stars	United States	0
16	Lauren Hemp	(England) Manchester City	England	0

=== The Best FIFA Women's Goalkeeper ===
Five players were initially shortlisted on 28 November 2024.

The selection criteria for the women's players and coaches was: respective achievements during the period from 21 August 2023 to 10 August 2024.

Alyssa Naeher won the award with 26 scoring points.

Rank	Player	Club(s) played for	National team	Points
The finalists
1	Alyssa Naeher	(United States) Chicago Red Stars	United States	26
2	Cata Coll	(Spain) Barcelona	Spain	22
3	Mary Earps	(England) Manchester United; (France) Paris Saint-Germain	England	11
Other candidates
4	Ann-Katrin Berger	(England) Chelsea; (United States) Gotham FC	Germany	9
5	Ayaka Yamashita	(Japan) INAC Kobe Leonessa; (England) Manchester City	Japan	4

=== The Best FIFA Women's Coach ===
Eight coaches were initially shortlisted on 28 November 2024.

The selection criteria for the women's players and coaches was: respective achievements during the period from 21 August 2023 to 10 August 2024.

Emma Hayes won the award with 23 scoring points.

Rank	Coach	Team(s) managed	Points
The finalists
1	(England) Emma Hayes	(England) Chelsea; United States	23
2	(Spain) Jonatan Giráldez	(Spain) Barcelona; (United States) Washington Spirit	20
3	(Brazil) Arthur Elias	(Brazil) Corinthians; Brazil	13
Other candidates
4	(France) Sonia Bompastor	(France) Lyon; (England) Chelsea	12
5	(Japan) Futoshi Ikeda	Japan	2
6	(Sweden) Elena Sadiku	(Scotland) Celtic	2
7	(England) Gareth Taylor	(England) Manchester City	0
8	(France) Sandrine Soubeyrand	(France) Paris FC	0

=== FIFA Marta Award ===
The eleven players initially shortlisted for the award were announced on 28 November 2024. All goals up for consideration were scored from 21 August 2023 to 10 August 2024.

Marta won the award with 22 scoring points.

Rank	Player	Match	Competition	Date	Points
1	(Brazil) Marta	Brazil – Jamaica	International friendly	1 June 2024	22
2	(Nigeria) Asisat Oshoala	Barcelona – Benfica	2023–24 UEFA Women's Champions League	14 November 2023	20
3	(France) Sakina Karchaoui	France – Sweden	UEFA Women's Euro 2025 qualifying	12 July 2024	16
4	(Italy) Giuseppina Moraca	Lazio – Bologna	2023–24 Serie B	15 October 2023	15
5	(Mexico) Mayra Pelayo-Bernal	United States – Mexico	2024 CONCACAF W Gold Cup	27 February 2024	12
6	(Germany) Paulina Krumbiegel	MSV Duisburg – TSG Hoffenheim	2023–24 Frauen-Bundesliga	2 February 2024	12
7	(France) Delphine Cascarino	Lyon – Benfica	2023–24 UEFA Women's Champions League	27 March 2024	10
8	(England) Beth Mead	Arsenal – West Ham United	2023–24 Women's Super League	26 November 2023	9
9	(Germany) Marina Hegering	SGS Essen – VfL Wolfsburg	2023–24 Frauen-Bundesliga	29 January 2024	9
10	(United States) Trinity Rodman	United States – Japan	2024 Summer Olympics	3 August 2024	9
11	(Serbia) Nina Matejić	Serbia U-19 – England U-19	2024 UEFA Women's Under-19 Championship	17 July 2024	6

=== FIFA Fan Award ===
The award celebrates the best fan moments or gestures of August 2023 to August 2024, regardless of championship, gender or nationality. The shortlist was compiled by a panel of FIFA experts. The award was chosen by a public vote on FIFA's website, with Brazilian Guilherme Gandra Moura winning.

Others in order of nomination.

Rank	Fan(s)	Reason	Votes	% of total votes
Nominees
1	(Brazil) Guilherme Gandra Moura	A young fan of player Gabriel Pec who got to meet his idol after waking from an induced coma due to epidermolysis bullosa.		
	(Mexico) José Armando	A teenage Cruz Azul fan who died of leukemia before being able to meet his favourite players.		
	(Scotland) Craig Ferguson	A Scotland fan who walked over 1,000 miles from Glasgow to Munich before UEFA Euro 2024 in order to raise money for charity, successfully raising almost £80,000.		

=== FIFA Fair Play Award ===
The Fair Play Award was decided by an expert panel. It was won by Brazilian footballer Thiago Maia.

Winner	Reason
(Brazil) Thiago Maia	For his selflessness during the 2024 Rio Grande do Sul floods after a video showed him helping an elderly woman evacuate.

=== FIFA Men's World 11 ===
77 players were initially nominated on 28 November 2024.

Each position was based on players' performances during the period from 21 August 2023 to 10 August 2024. Every registered FIFA.com user was allowed to participate in a public vote until 10 December 2024, the day after the 2024 FIFPRO World 11 was announced.

The players chosen were Emiliano Martínez as goalkeeper, Dani Carvajal, Antonio Rüdiger, Rúben Dias and William Saliba as defenders, Jude Bellingham, Rodri and Toni Kroos as midfielders, and Lamine Yamal, Erling Haaland, and Vinícius Júnior as forwards.

2024 FIFA Men's World 11

Player	Club(s)
Goalkeeper
(Argentina) Emiliano Martínez	(England) Aston Villa
Defenders
(Spain) Dani Carvajal	(Spain) Real Madrid
(Germany) Antonio Rüdiger	(Spain) Real Madrid
(Portugal) Rúben Dias	(England) Manchester City
(France) William Saliba	(England) Arsenal
Midfielders
(England) Jude Bellingham	(Spain) Real Madrid
(Spain) Rodri	(England) Manchester City
(Germany) Toni Kroos	(Spain) Real Madrid (retired)
Forwards
(Spain) Lamine Yamal	(Spain) Barcelona
(Norway) Erling Haaland	(England) Manchester City
(Brazil) Vinícius Júnior	(Spain) Real Madrid

Other nominees

Player	Club(s)
Goalkeepers
(Morocco) Yassine Bounou	(Saudi Arabia) Al Hilal
(Italy) Gianluigi Donnarumma	(France) Paris Saint-Germain
(Brazil) Ederson	(England) Manchester City
(Ukraine) Andriy Lunin	(Spain) Real Madrid
(France) Mike Maignan	(Italy) AC Milan
(Georgia (country)) Giorgi Mamardashvili	(Spain) Valencia
(Spain) David Raya	(England) Arsenal
(Spain) Unai Simón	(Spain) Athletic Bilbao
(Switzerland) Yann Sommer	(Italy) Inter Milan
(South Africa) Ronwen Williams	(South Africa) Mamelodi Sundowns
Defenders
(Switzerland) Manuel Akanji	(England) Manchester City
(Italy) Alessandro Bastoni	(Italy) Inter Milan
(Brazil) Bremer	(Italy) Juventus
(New Zealand) Liberato Cacace	(Italy) Empoli
(Brazil) Dante	(France) Nice
(Canada) Alphonso Davies	(Germany) Bayern Munich
(Italy) Federico Dimarco	(Italy) Inter Milan
(Netherlands) Jeremie Frimpong	(Germany) Bayer Leverkusen
(Brazil) Gabriel Magalhães	(England) Arsenal
(Spain) Álex Grimaldo	(Germany) Bayer Leverkusen
(Morocco) Achraf Hakimi	(France) Paris Saint-Germain
(Germany) Mats Hummels	(Germany) Borussia Dortmund; (Italy) Roma
(Canada) Alistair Johnston	(Scotland) Celtic
(Spain) Aymeric Laporte	(Saudi Arabia) Al Nassr
(Brazil) Nino	(Brazil) Fluminense; (Russia) Zenit Saint Petersburg
(Argentina) Nicolás Otamendi	(Portugal) Benfica
(Germany) Jonathan Tah	(Germany) Bayer Leverkusen
(Nigeria) William Troost-Ekong	(Greece) PAOK; (Saudi Arabia) Al Kholood
Midfielders
(Argentina) Luciano Acosta	(United States) FC Cincinnati
(Argentina) Thiago Almada	(United States) Atlanta United; (Brazil) Botafogo
(Spain) Álex Baena	(Spain) Villarreal
(Turkey) Hakan Çalhanoğlu	(Italy) Inter Milan
(France) Eduardo Camavinga	(Spain) Real Madrid
(England) Phil Foden	(England) Manchester City
(Brazil) Ganso	(Brazil) Fluminense
(Japan) Takefusa Kubo	(Spain) Real Sociedad
(Spain) Fermín López	(Spain) Barcelona
(Norway) Martin Ødegaard	(England) Arsenal
(Spain) Dani Olmo	(Germany) RB Leipzig; (Spain) Barcelona
(England) Cole Palmer	(England) Chelsea
(United States) Christian Pulisic	(Italy) AC Milan
(England) Declan Rice	(England) Arsenal
(Colombia) James Rodríguez	(Brazil) São Paulo; (Spain) Rayo Vallecano
(Spain) Fabián Ruiz	(France) Paris Saint-Germain
(Uruguay) Federico Valverde	(Spain) Real Madrid
(Germany) Florian Wirtz	(Germany) Bayer Leverkusen
(Switzerland) Granit Xhaka	(Germany) Bayer Leverkusen
Forwards
(Qatar) Akram Afif	(Qatar) Al Sadd
(Gabon) Pierre-Emerick Aubameyang	(France) Marseille; (Saudi Arabia) Al Qadsiah
(Argentina) Germán Cano	(Brazil) Fluminense
(Ukraine) Artem Dovbyk	(Spain) Girona; (Italy) Roma
(Sweden) Viktor Gyökeres	(Portugal) Sporting CP
(England) Harry Kane	(Germany) Bayern Munich
(Nigeria) Ademola Lookman	(Italy) Atalanta
(Argentina) Lautaro Martínez	(Italy) Inter Milan
(France) Kylian Mbappé	(France) Paris Saint-Germain; (Spain) Real Madrid
(Argentina) Lionel Messi	(United States) Inter Miami
(Germany) Jamal Musiala	(Germany) Bayern Munich
(Morocco) Soufiane Rahimi	(United Arab Emirates) Al Ain
(Brazil) Rodrygo	(Spain) Real Madrid
(Portugal) Cristiano Ronaldo	(Saudi Arabia) Al Nassr
(Venezuela) Salomón Rondón	(Argentina) River Plate; (Mexico) Pachuca
(England) Bukayo Saka	(England) Arsenal
(Uruguay) Luis Suárez	(Brazil) Grêmio; (United States) Inter Miami
(England) Ollie Watkins	(England) Aston Villa
(Spain) Nico Williams	(Spain) Athletic Bilbao

=== FIFA Women's World 11 ===
The players chosen were Alyssa Naeher as goalkeeper, Lucy Bronze, Naomi Girma, Irene Paredes and Ona Batlle as defenders, Gabi Portilho, Patri Guijarro, Lindsey Horan and Aitana Bonmatí as midfielders, and Caroline Graham Hansen and Salma Paralluelo as forwards.

2024 FIFA Women's World 11

Player	Club(s)
Goalkeepers
(United States) Alyssa Naeher	(United States) Chicago Red Stars
Defenders
(England) Lucy Bronze	(Spain) Barcelona; (England) Chelsea
(United States) Naomi Girma	(United States) San Diego Wave
(Spain) Irene Paredes	(Spain) Barcelona
(Spain) Ona Batlle	(Spain) Barcelona
Midfielders
(Brazil) Gabi Portilho	(Brazil) Corinthians
(Spain) Patri Guijarro	(Spain) Barcelona
(United States) Lindsey Horan	(France) Lyon
(Spain) Aitana Bonmatí	(Spain) Barcelona
Forwards
(Norway) Caroline Graham Hansen	(Spain) Barcelona
(Spain) Salma Paralluelo	(Spain) Barcelona

Other nominees

Player	Club(s)
Goalkeepers
(Germany) Ann-Katrin Berger	(England) Chelsea; (United States) Gotham FC
(Spain) Cata Coll	(Spain) Barcelona
(England) Mary Earps	(England) Manchester United; (France) Paris Saint-Germain
(Chile) Christiane Endler	(France) Lyon
(England) Hannah Hampton	(England) Chelsea
(Brazil) Lorena	(Brazil) Grêmio
(Sweden) Zećira Mušović	(England) Chelsea
(Spain) Sandra Paños	(Spain) Barcelona; (Mexico) América
(Canada) Kailen Sheridan	(United States) San Diego Wave
(Japan) Ayaka Yamashita	(Japan) INAC Kobe Leonessa; (England) Manchester City
Defenders
(France) Selma Bacha	(France) Lyon
(Sweden) Nathalie Björn	(England) Everton; (England) Chelsea
(New Zealand) CJ Bott	(England) Leicester City
(England) Millie Bright	(England) Chelsea
(Canada) Kadeisha Buchanan	(England) Chelsea
(Australia) Ellie Carpenter	(France) Lyon
(England) Jess Carter	(England) Chelsea; (United States) Gotham FC
(Australia) Steph Catley	(England) Arsenal
(England) Niamh Charles	(England) Chelsea
(Norway) Ingrid Syrstad Engen	(Spain) Barcelona
(United States) Emily Fox	(United States) North Carolina Courage; (England) Arsenal
(Canada) Vanessa Gilles	(France) Lyon
(Germany) Giulia Gwinn	(Germany) Bayern Munich
(Canada) Ashley Lawrence	(England) Chelsea
(Brazil) Tarciane	(Brazil) Corinthians; (United States) Houston Dash
(Republic of Ireland) Katie McCabe	(England) Arsenal
(Brazil) Rafaelle Souza	(United States) Orlando Pride
(Iceland) Glódís Perla Viggósdóttir	(Germany) Bayern Munich
Midfielders
(Spain) Teresa Abelleira	(Spain) Real Madrid
(Spain) Laia Aleixandri	(England) Manchester City
(Germany) Jule Brand	(Germany) VfL Wolfsburg
(United States) Sam Coffey	(United States) Portland Thorns
(Scotland) Erin Cuthbert	(England) Chelsea
(France) Kenza Dali	(England) Aston Villa
(Netherlands) Damaris Egurrola	(France) Lyon
(Canada) Jessie Fleming	(England) Chelsea; (United States) Portland Thorns
(France) Grace Geyoro	(France) Paris Saint-Germain
(Italy) Manuela Giugliano	(Italy) Roma
(Japan) Yui Hasegawa	(England) Manchester City
(Japan) Saki Kumagai	(Italy) Roma
(Germany) Sjoeke Nüsken	(England) Chelsea
(Canada) Quinn	(United States) Seattle Reign
(Norway) Guro Reiten	(England) Chelsea
(France) Sandie Toletti	(Spain) Real Madrid
(England) Keira Walsh	(Spain) Barcelona
(Netherlands) Daniëlle van de Donk	(France) Lyon
Forwards
(Brazil) Adriana	(United States) Orlando Pride
(Zambia) Barbra Banda	(China) Shanghai Shengli; (United States) Orlando Pride
(Germany) Klara Bühl	(Germany) Bayern Munich
(Spain) Mariona Caldentey	(Spain) Barcelona; (England) Arsenal
(Malawi) Tabitha Chawinga	(France) Paris Saint-Germain; (France) Lyon
(Malawi) Temwa Chawinga	(China) Wuhan Jianghan University; (United States) Kansas City Current
(France) Kadidiatou Diani	(France) Lyon
(Haiti) Melchie Dumornay	(France) Lyon
(England) Lauren Hemp	(England) Manchester City
(England) Lauren James	(England) Chelsea
(France) Marie-Antoinette Katoto	(France) Paris Saint-Germain
(Zambia) Racheal Kundananji	(Spain) Madrid CFF; (United States) Bay FC
(Brazil) Kerolin	(United States) North Carolina Courage
(Poland) Ewa Pajor	(Germany) VfL Wolfsburg; (Spain) Barcelona
(Colombia) Mayra Ramírez	(Spain) Levante; (England) Chelsea
(United States) Trinity Rodman	(United States) Washington Spirit
(Germany) Lea Schüller	(Germany) Bayern Munich
(Jamaica) Khadija Shaw	(England) Manchester City
(United States) Sophia Smith	(United States) Portland Thorns
(United States) Mallory Swanson	(United States) Chicago Red Stars
