= 2019 FIFA Women's World Cup qualification – UEFA Group 3 =

Football tournament qualification stage

UEFA Group 3 of the 2019 FIFA Women's World Cup qualification competition consisted of five teams: Norway, the Netherlands, the Republic of Ireland, Slovakia, and Northern Ireland. The composition of the seven groups in the qualifying group stage was decided by the draw held on 25 April 2017, with the teams seeded according to their coefficient ranking.

The group was played in home-and-away round-robin format between 15 September 2017 and 4 September 2018. The group winners qualified for the final tournament, while the runners-up advanced to the play-offs if they were one of the four best runners-up among all seven groups (not counting results against the fifth-placed team).

== Standings ==
Pos	Team	Pld	W	D	L	GF	GA	GD	Pts	Qualification	Norway	Netherlands	Ireland		Slovakia
1	Norway	8	7	0	1	22	4	+18	21	2019 FIFA Women's World Cup	—	2–1	1–0	4–1	6–1
2	Netherlands	8	6	1	1	22	2	+20	19	Play-offs	1–0	—	0–0	7–0	1–0
3	Republic of Ireland	8	4	1	3	10	6	+4	13		0–2	0–2	—	4–0	2–1
4	Northern Ireland	8	1	0	7	4	27	−23	3 (Note: Head-to-head results: Slovakia 1–3 Northern Ireland, Northern Ireland 0–1 Slovakia.)		0–3	0–5	0–2	—	0–1
5	Slovakia	8	1	0	7	4	23	−19	3		0–4	0–5	0–2	1–3	—

Source: UEFA
Rules for classification: Qualification tiebreakers

== Matches ==
Times are CET/CEST, (Note: CEST (UTC+2) for dates between 26 March and 28 October 2017 and between 25 March and 27 October 2018, and CET (UTC+1) for all other dates.) as listed by UEFA (local times, if different, are in parentheses).

15 September 2017
17:55

Norway	4–1	Northern Ireland
Reiten 15', 90+2'; Graham Hansen 45+2' (pen.); Utland 52'	Report	Milligan 89'

Fredrikstad Stadion, Fredrikstad
Attendance: 630
Referee: Olga Zadinová (Czech Republic)

19 September 2017
17:55

Norway	6–1	Slovakia
Utland 3'; Thorsnes 9'; Reiten 21'; Graham Hansen 27', 42' (pen.); Mjelde 37' (pen.)	Report	Fabová 55'

Sarpsborg Stadion, Sarpsborg
Attendance: 912
Referee: Sofia Karagiorgi (Cyprus)
19 September 2017
20:30 (19:30 BST)

Northern Ireland	0–2	Republic of Ireland
	Report	Furness 45+1' (o.g.); Campbell 69'

Mourneview Park, Lurgan
Attendance: 877
Referee: Vesna Budimir (Croatia)

24 October 2017
17:30

Slovakia	0–2	Republic of Ireland
	Report	O'Sullivan 11'; Vojteková 33' (o.g.)

NTC Senec, Senec
Attendance: 435
Referee: Triinu Laos (Estonia)
24 October 2017
19:00

Netherlands	1–0	Norway
Miedema 90+3'	Report

Euroborg, Groningen
Attendance: 20,980
Referee: Jana Adámková (Czech Republic)

24 November 2017
19:00

Slovakia	0–5	Netherlands
	Report	van der Gragt 8', 90+1'; Spitse 42'; Miedema 45+1', 46'

NTC Senec, Senec
Attendance: 342
Referee: Volha Tsiareshka (Belarus)

28 November 2017
17:30

Slovakia	1–3	Northern Ireland
Vojteková 20'	Report	Nelson 34'; Furness 52'; Milligan 61'

Štadión pod Dubňom, Žilina
Attendance: 448
Referee: Tinna Høj Christensen (Denmark)
28 November 2017
20:00

Netherlands	0–0	Republic of Ireland
	Report

Stadion de Goffert, Nijmegen
Attendance: 11,400
Referee: Anastasia Pustovoitova (Russia)

6 April 2018
18:00 (17:00 IST)

Republic of Ireland	2–1	Slovakia
Kiernan 69'; Barrett 87'	Report	Hourihan 73' (o.g.)

Tallaght Stadium, Dublin
Attendance: 3,521
Referee: Simona Ghisletta (Switzerland)
6 April 2018
20:00

Netherlands	7–0	Northern Ireland
Martens 9', 17'; Miedema 27'; Spitse 42' (pen.), 76'; van de Sanden 63'; Simpson 90+3' (o.g.)	Report

Philips Stadion, Eindhoven
Attendance: 30,238
Referee: Monika Mularczyk (Poland)

10 April 2018
20:00 (19:00 IST)

Republic of Ireland	0–2	Netherlands
	Report	Beerensteyn 11'; Spitse 23' (pen.)

Tallaght Stadium, Dublin
Attendance: 4,047
Referee: Stéphanie Frappart (France)
10 April 2018
20:30 (19:30 BST)

Northern Ireland	0–3	Norway
	Report	Graham Hansen 61', 87'; Herlovsen 90+3'

Shamrock Park, Portadown
Attendance: 504
Referee: Lina Lehtovaara (Finland)

8 June 2018
18:30 (17:30 IST)

Republic of Ireland	0–2	Norway
	Report	Utland 21', 61'

Tallaght Stadium, Dublin
Attendance: 3,172
Referee: Kateryna Monzul (Ukraine)
8 June 2018
20:30 (19:30 BST)

Northern Ireland	0–5	Netherlands
	Report	Beerensteyn 37'; van de Donk 61'; van de Sanden 65'; Spitse 75' (pen.); Groenen 89'

Shamrock Park, Portadown
Attendance: 954
Referee: Tess Olofsson (Sweden)

12 June 2018
18:00

Norway	1–0	Republic of Ireland
Graham Hansen 25' (pen.)	Report

Viking Stadion, Stavanger
Attendance: 3,609
Referee: Esther Staubli (Switzerland)
12 June 2018
20:00

Netherlands	1–0	Slovakia
Martens 90+2'	Report

Abe Lenstra Stadion, Heerenveen
Attendance: 23,221
Referee: María Dolores Martinez Madrona (Spain)

31 August 2018
18:30 (17:30 IST)

Republic of Ireland	4–0	Northern Ireland
Kiernan 4', 27'; McCabe 12', 58' (pen.)	Report

Tallaght Stadium, Dublin
Attendance: 1,603
Referee: Angelika Söder (Germany)
31 August 2018
20:00

Slovakia	0–4	Norway
	Report	Utland 11', 26', 87'; Reiten 22'

NTC Senec, Senec
Attendance: 373
Referee: Valentina Finzi (Italy)

4 September 2018
17:00

Norway	2–1	Netherlands
Syrstad Engen 5'; Herlovsen 6'	Report	Miedema 31'

Intility Arena, Oslo
Attendance: 5,134
Referee: Riem Hussein (Germany)
4 September 2018
20:30 (19:30 BST)

Northern Ireland	0–1	Slovakia
	Report	Škorvánková 36'

Shamrock Park, Portadown
Attendance: 133
Referee: Alina Peşu (Romania)

== Goalscorers ==
There were 62 goals scored in 20 matches, for an average of 3.1 goals per match.

7 goals

- (Norway) Lisa-Marie Karlseng Utland

6 goals

- (Norway) Caroline Graham Hansen

5 goals

- (Netherlands) Vivianne Miedema
- (Netherlands) Sherida Spitse

4 goals

- (Norway) Guro Reiten

3 goals

- (Republic of Ireland) Leanne Kiernan
- (Netherlands) Lieke Martens

2 goals

- (Republic of Ireland) Katie McCabe
- (Netherlands) Lineth Beerensteyn
- (Netherlands) Stefanie van der Gragt
- (Netherlands) Shanice van de Sanden
- (Norway) Isabell Herlovsen
- (Northern Ireland) Caragh Milligan

1 goal

- (Netherlands) Daniëlle van de Donk
- (Netherlands) Jackie Groenen
- (Northern Ireland) Rachel Furness
- (Northern Ireland) Julie Nelson
- (Norway) Ingrid Syrstad Engen
- (Norway) Maren Mjelde
- (Norway) Elise Thorsnes
- (Republic of Ireland) Amber Barrett
- (Republic of Ireland) Megan Campbell
- (Republic of Ireland) Denise O'Sullivan
- (Slovakia) Klaudia Fabová
- (Slovakia) Dominika Škorvánková
- (Slovakia) Jana Vojteková

1 own goal

- (Northern Ireland) Rachel Furness (against Republic of Ireland)
- (Northern Ireland) Billie Simpson (against The Netherlands)
- (Republic of Ireland) Marie Hourihan (against Slovakia)
- (Slovakia) Jana Vojteková (against Republic of Ireland)
