= Caroline Graham Hansen =

Norwegian footballer (born 1995)

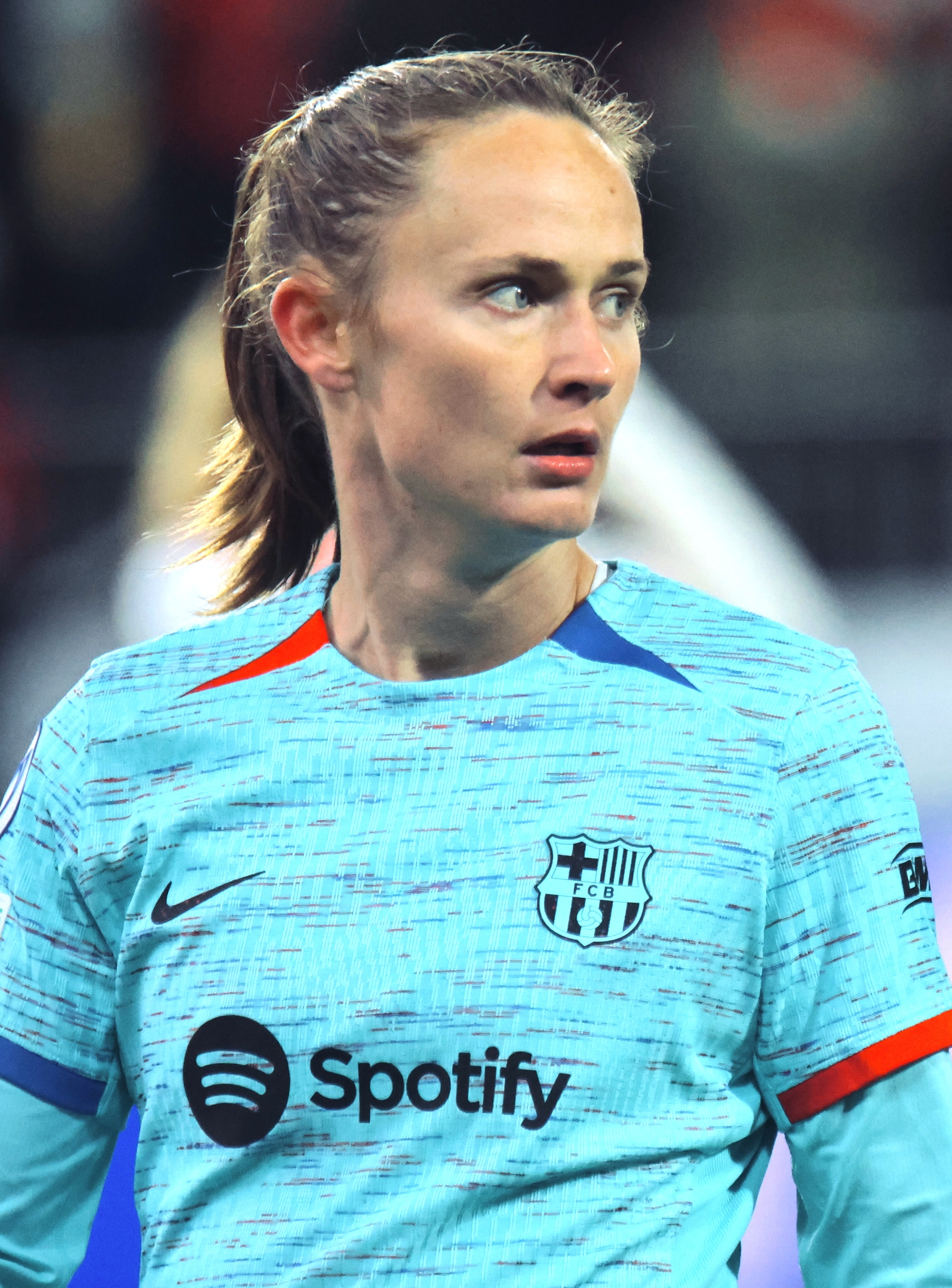
- Graham Hansen with Barcelona in 2024

Personal information
- Full name: Caroline Graham Hansen
- Date of birth: 18 February 1995 (age 31)
- Place of birth: Oslo, Norway
- Height: 1.74 m (5 ft 9 in)
- Position: Winger

Team information
- Current team: Barcelona
- Number: 10

Youth career
- Lyn

Senior career*
Years	Team	Apps	(Gls)
2010–2013	Stabæk	71	(32)
2013	Tyresö	7	(3)
2014	Stabæk	9	(2)
2014–2019	VfL Wolfsburg	88	(29)
2019–	Barcelona	151	(81)

International career^{‡}
2009–2010	Norway U15	3	(0)
2009–2010	Norway U16	11	(5)
2010–2011	Norway U17	5	(1)
2011–2012	Norway U19	14	(5)
2012	Norway U20	7	(3)
2011–	Norway	127	(54)
Medal record
Women's football
Representing Norway
UEFA Women's Championship
Silver medal – second place	Sweden 2013	Team
- * Club domestic league appearances and goals as of 16:24, 21 November 2026 (UTC) ‡ National team caps and goals as of 9 June 2026

Caroline Graham Hansen (Norwegian: [kɑrʊliːnə ɡrɑːm hɑnsn̩]; born 18 February 1995) is a Norwegian professional footballer who plays as a winger for Spanish Liga F club FC Barcelona and the Norway national team.

Hansen started out her professional career playing in the Norwegian Toppserien with Stabæk. She then spent the second part of the 2013 Damallsvenskan season in Sweden, playing for Tyresö FF. Hansen represented Norway at youth international level, and made her debut for the senior team in 2011. In 2013, 18-year-old Hansen played a major role in the Norwegian team that won silver at UEFA Euro 2013.

Hansen made the move to the Frauen Bundesliga in 2014 to play for VFL Wolfsburg, where she began to develop multiple serious, long-term injuries between the years of 2015 and 2018. Despite this, she reached two UEFA Champions League Finals with the club in 2016 and 2018, and won 8 major trophies- 3 league titles and 5 DFB-Pokal titles. In the midst of her club success with Wolfsburg, she struggled with her national team. In 2015, she missed that year's World Cup due to injury, and in 2017, she was part of the Norway squad that had their worst-ever finish in a Euro tournament with 0 goals and 0 points.

2019 was a breakout year for Hansen, when she signed for 2019 UEFA Champions League finalists FC Barcelona, and was one of the most noteworthy players of the 2019 FIFA World Cup with Norway. She was nominated for multiple year-end awards for the first time, including The Best and the FIFA FIFPro World XI. Her successes continued with FC Barcelona as she was integral to the 2019–20 side that won their first league title since 2015. Hansen then went on to win the UEFA Champions League with the club for the first time in 2021, as well as the continental treble.

Hansen is widely regarded as one of the best wingers in the world for her performances for both club and country.

== Early and personal life ==
Hansen was born and brought up in Oslo, Norway, in the neighborhood of Tåsen. She is the eldest child of Petter Norman Hansen and Bettina Graham Hansen; her younger brother, Fredrik, plays football for Gamle Oslo FK. Caroline Graham Hansen is often called Caro, and plays with the name Graham on her jersey. The family name Graham is British, from Caroline's great-grandfather who moved from Britain (per Graham Hansen, either Northern England or Scotland) to Norway to work as a train driver.

Growing up, Hansen's father travelled with her to attend different football games; she was a fan of Manchester United and FC Barcelona. Her childhood idol was former Barcelona forward Rivaldo. In 2016, she hosted a girls' training camp with Norwegian former United forward Ole Gunnar Solskjær. Outside of football, Graham Hansen was a competitive chess player between the ages of six and eight.

Their parents sent Caroline and Fredrik to a private sports school, the Norges Toppidrettsgymnas Bærum in Bærum. The siblings were raised by their father to be incredibly competitive between each other and to "like to make a fool out of the other"; they were never left without adult supervision, as they were prone to break out into fights. Graham Hansen has said that her coaches' response to her competitive nature helped her channel this into a desire to perform better and win. Though Graham Hansen became a professional footballer as a teenager, she got her high school diploma so that she would be able to study in the future; while playing for VfL Wolfsburg she studied medicine for a year.

Hansen has discussed her struggles with her mental health after dealing with multiple injury problems during her time at Wolfsburg. In 2019, she spoke about how she sought help from a sports psychologist. She writes poetry and enjoys attending Andrea Bocelli concerts.

== Club career ==
=== Lyn (youth) ===
Hansen played for Lyn as a part of mixed-gender teams of both boys and girls up until the age of 14, because her coach said she was a bad influence to the boys on the team. This decision started debate within the club, and as a result, Hansen moved up to play as a starter with Lyn's G94 team, made up of boys a year older than her. Hansen says this is where she learned to play smarter and make better choices with the ball, because the boys were physically advantaged by that point. Hansen played for Lyn up to age 15, and was a part of the team that won the under-16 girls' class in the Norway Cup.

=== Stabæk (2010–2013) ===
Hansen made the move to her first professional club Stabæk in August 2010, and made her Toppserien debut the same week, as a 73rd-minute substitute in the match against FK Donn. Hansen recorded an assist as Stabæk won 3–0. Graham Hansen was allowed to train with the club's boys' teams, something unprecedented; already renowned, the boys reportedly responded to her presence by saying "the women's football Messi is coming to train with us." One of the players, Endre Lübeck, recalled that they treated Graham Hansen like part of their own team. Stabæk won the league title later that year with a 3–0 home win over Trondheims-Ørn. She was a part of Stabæk's 2011 Norwegian Women's Cup winning team, who beat Røa on penalties after extra time. Hansen assisted Katrine Pedersen's equalizer during the extra time, but was the only Stabæk player to miss in the shoot out.

=== Tyresö (2013) ===
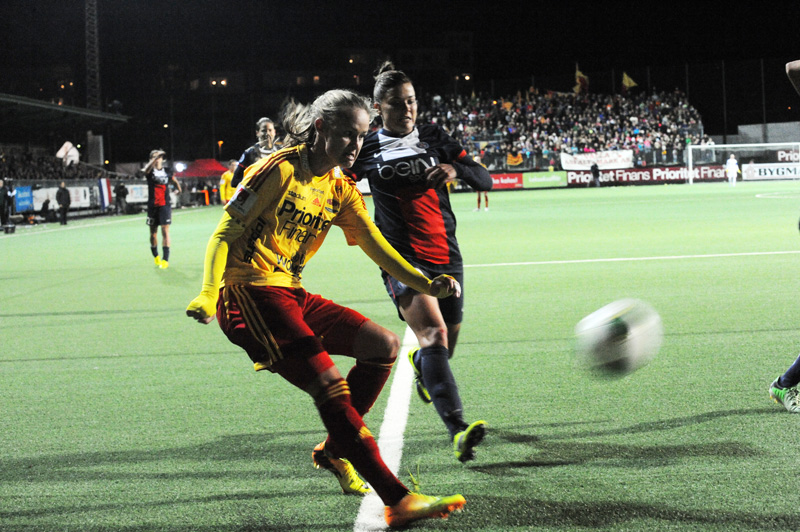
Hansen playing for Tyresö in 2013

In August 2013, Hansen signed for Swedish Damallsvenskan champions Tyresö FF. In the second half of the season she started five of her seven league appearances and scored three goals. She also featured in Tyresö's Round of 32 tie against Paris Saint-Germain and Round of 16 tie against Fortuna Hjørring in the 2013–14 UEFA Champions League.

=== Return to Stabæk (2014) ===
Hansen returned to Stabæk in January 2014 to complete her high school education, as she did not get the grades necessary to do so in Sweden. She was also concerned by the instability of the club, which would end up folding the following summer after reaching the 2014 UEFA Champions League Final. She continued to be monitored by several leading European clubs and intended to move away again after finishing school in June 2014. Understanding that female footballers do not earn enough money to retire on, Hansen was planning for her career after football. Upon returning to Stabæk she arranged to play Toppserien matches for the women's team while training with the senior and youth male teams.

=== Wolfsburg (2014–2019) ===
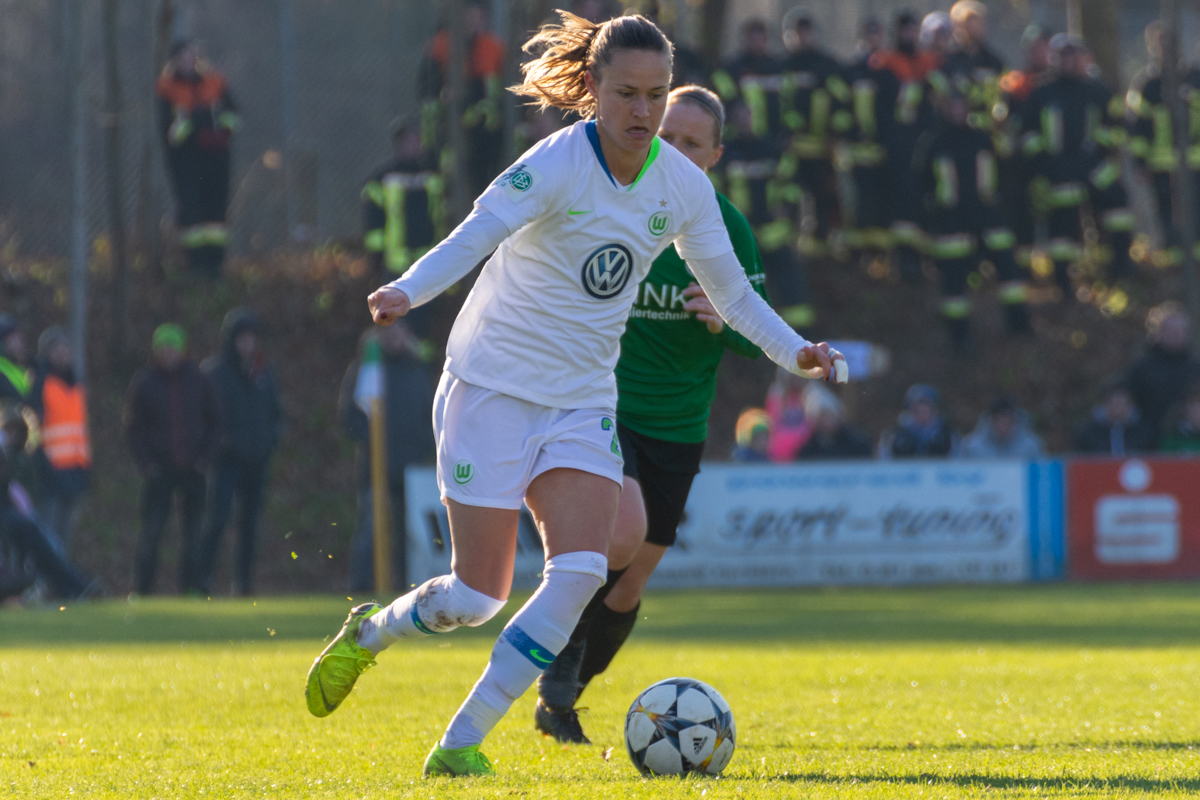
Hansen playing for VfL Wolfsburg in 2018.

On 8 May 2014, German club VfL Wolfsburg announced they had signed a two-year contract with Hansen. Norwegian media stated her annual salary as around £100,000. Near the end of her first season at Wolfsburg, Hansen was diagnosed with jumper's knee. This injury ended up destroying most of the tendon in her knee, leading to years worth of injury troubles. The injury kept her out of the remainder of Wolfsburg's 2014–15 Champions League competition and the 2015 Algarve Cup with Norway, as well as that year's World Cup with her country. Hansen sustained another injury, a kneecap fracture, near the end of the 2015–16 season. The following month, Wolfsburg reached the 2016 UEFA Champions League Final, where Hansen sat out with the injury as her club was defeated 4–3 on penalties to Lyon after a 1–1 draw in regular time.

In November 2016, Hansen suffered a fracture in her leg in a league match against 1. FFC Frankfurt that removed her from play for two months. After recovering from her leg fracture, Hansen returned to play in the 2016–17 UEFA Champions League where Wolfsburg faced Lyon in the quarterfinal. In the second leg, Hansen scored a penalty in the 82nd minute, but it ended up being nothing more than a consolation goal as the eventual champions won 2–1 on aggregate. Later that season, she won the domestic double with Wolfsburg for the first time, earning her first league title with the club as well as defeating SC Sand 2–1 in the 2017 DFB-Pokal final.

In February 2018, Hansen extended her contract at Wolfsburg for one more year to 2019. She won the league for the second time with Wolfsburg that season. A few days after her Wolfsburg's league win was made official, Hansen faced the first penalty shootout of her career in the 2018 DFB-Pokal final. She scored the decisive penalty against Bayern Munich, securing her second domestic double with the club. In the final, however, she picked up an injury but played the full 120 minutes of the match. Less than a week later, she started the 2018 UEFA Champions League Final, but went down in pain after a quarter of an hour. Hansen was taken off injured at halftime and replaced by Tessa Wullaert, and the final went to extra time where Wolfsburg lost to Lyon after Lyon scored 4 goals within twenty minutes.

In Hansen's final season at Wolfsburg, she decided to not renew her contract, which expired that year. That season, she won the DFB-Pokal with Wolfsburg for the fifth time, where she started and played all 90 minutes in the final against SC Freiburg, which ended 1–0 for Wolfsburg thanks to a goal from Ewa Pajor. Wolfsburg also won the league again that year, her third such title with the club.

In her final season in Wolfsburg, she had scored 14 goals and registered 29 assists in 33 matches. By the end of her time in Germany, she had scored 51 goals in 133 appearances and won 8 major trophies.

=== Barcelona (2019–) ===
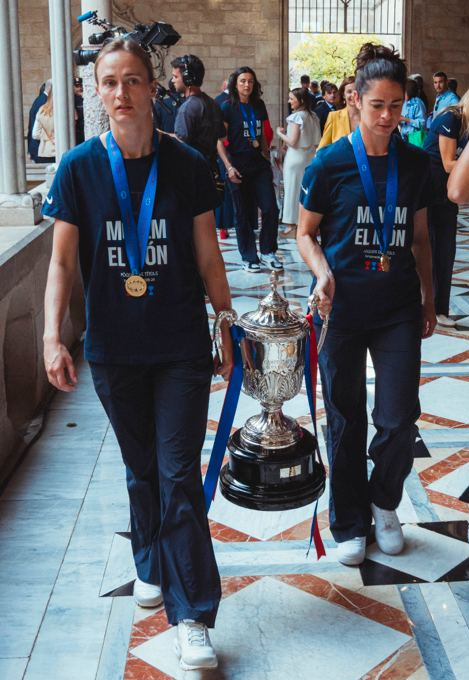
Graham Hansen (left) with Marta Torrejón and Barcelona's 2024 Copa de la Reina trophy, wearing 2023–24 UEFA Women's Champions League winner's medals

==== 2019–20 season ====
On 20 May 2019, it was announced Hansen had signed with FC Barcelona on a two-year contract, becoming the first Norwegian (both in women's and men's football) to sign for the blaugrana club. She mentioned being attracted to Barcelona because of their possession style of football. Her first title with the club came on 24 August 2020, winning the Copa Catalunya. Hansen made her league debut with the club on the first matchday of the season, where Barcelona defeated CD TACÓN (now Real Madrid Femenino). Hansen scored the 6th goal in a rout of Los Blancos that ended 9–1 in Barcelona's favour.

On 10 February 2020, Barcelona beat Real Sociedad by 10–1 to archive the Supercopa de España title, with Hansen scoring Barcelona's fifth goal. In March 2020, Hansen joined a group of athletes in donating 10% of her Barcelona salary to people affected by the COVID-19 pandemic. On 6 May 2020, the Royal Spanish Football Federation announced the premature end of the league, naming Barcelona as league champions. She finished the 2019–20 league season as the Primera Division's top assister.

Although the domestic league was concluded, the 2019–20 UEFA Champions League competition still remained suspended until its resumption in August 2020, where it was played in the Basque Country in single-leg knockout stages. Hansen started the match against Barcelona's domestic rivals Atlético Madrid in the quarterfinals, where she played all 90 minutes. Barcelona were kept scoreless until they were rescued by a goal in the 80th minute from Kheira Hamraoui, who scored from a ball rebounded off a cross from Hansen. In the semifinal, she faced her former team VfL Wolfsburg, where Barcelona fell 1–0 to the Germans.

==== 2020–21 season ====
In 2021, Hansen started the first competitive match ever played by a women's team at the Camp Nou. In that match, she assisted Alexia Putellas from a corner, the first ever goal scored by a woman at the stadium. About a week later, she renewed her contract with Barcelona until 2023.

In the 2020–21 UEFA Champions League Round of 32, Hansen scored two goals against Dutch side PSV, as Barcelona finished the tie with an aggregate score of 8–2 in their favour. Barcelona advanced to the Round of 16 against Fortuna Hjørring and then to the quarterfinals, where they faced Manchester City. Hansen started the first leg of the quarterfinal, but limped off the pitch in the 62nd minute with a knee injury. She returned for the second leg, where she assisted Asisat Oshoala in Barcelona's only goal of the match, which ended City 2–1 Barcelona.

Barcelona moved on to face Paris Saint-Germain in their semifinal tie. In the second leg of the semifinals, Hansen assisted Lieke Martens' second goal from a cross across the box. That second goal brought the aggregate score of the tie to 3–2, and sent Barcelona to their second ever UEFA Women's Champions League Final. On 16 May 2021, Hansen started the final against Chelsea and scored Barcelona's fourth goal of the match, a tap-in from a Martens assist in the 36th minute. Hansen's goal made it 4–0 against Chelsea, the largest margin of victory in any single-legged UWCL final. Hansen was substituted in the 62nd minute of the final by Mariona Caldenty and lifted her first European title of her career after two losses in two other Champions League finals. She revealed in a post-match interview that due to her years of injuries and repeated losses in Champions League finals that she used to feel that "football was no longer fun" and intended to retire prematurely back in 2018. Hansen was named to the 2020–21 UWCL Squad of the Season alongside seven other Barcelona players, and ended that year's UWCL campaign with 3 goals and 5 assists in 9 matches. She was later listed as one of nominees to the UEFA Women's Champions League Forward of the Season award.

Hansen finished her league season as Spain's assist leader with 18. In November 2021, Hansen was named Player of the Season for the 2020–21 Primera División.

==== 2021–22 season ====
In November 2021, she was temporarily taken off the active roster after experiencing a overly high heart rate and chest discomfort during a match. The club announced that she would be undergoing cardiac diagnostic tests as a result. The club later announced that would be returning to play after successfully undergoing treatment for a heart condition. Hansen returned to the pitch in Barcelona's UEFA Champion's League second group stage match against Arsenal, where she assisted Jenni Hermoso's second goal in a 4–0 win.

==== 2022–23 season ====
In January 2023, Hansen extended her contract with Barcelona until June 2026. She scored a hat trick in the 2023–24 Supercopa final.

==== 2023–24 season ====
In the 2023-2024 season, Hansen became Barcelona's top goalscorer in the league, also having nearly as many assists.

== International career ==
In 2011, 16-year-old Hansen was a part of the Norwegian under-19 team who finished as runners-up in the 2011 UEFA U-19 Championship, after losing the final against Germany. Hansen was also included in the Norwegian squad for the 2012 FIFA U-20 World Cup in Japan, where the team reached the quarter-final.

She made her senior debut for Norway against Belgium in November 2011. In June 2012 Hansen scored her first senior international goal in an 11–0 rout of Bulgaria, a match in which she also assisted more than half of Norway's goals.

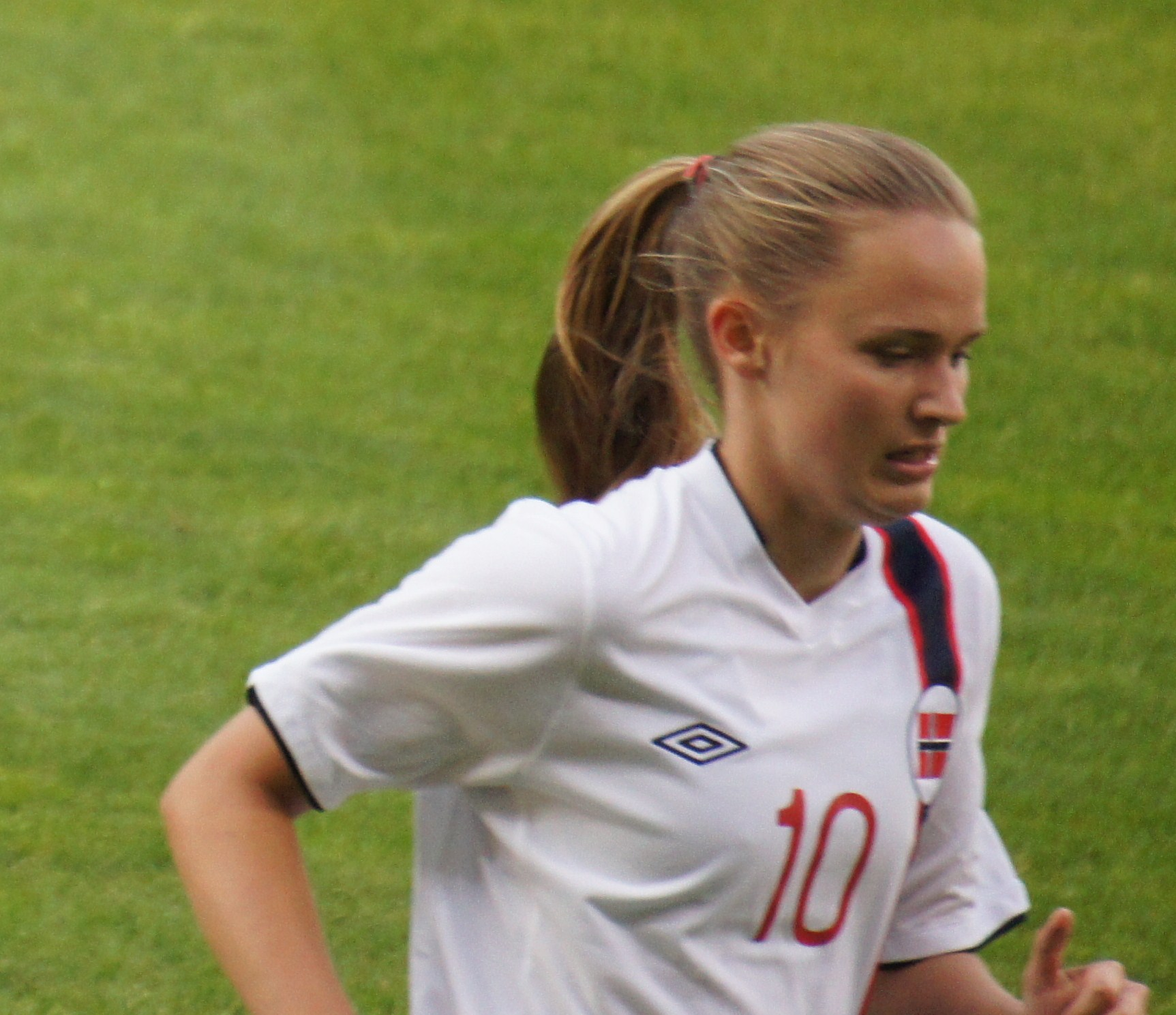
Hansen with Norway in 2013.

Hansen was named to Norway's squad for UEFA Euro 2013 by veteran coach Even Pellerud. Winger Hansen and fellow teenage forward Ada Hegerberg at striker were important players in the Norwegian team which reached the competition's final; within the young Norway side, the pair and 20-year-old Kristine Minde were considered veterans. In the final at Friends Arena, Hansen won a 61st-minute penalty after drawing a foul from Saskia Bartusiak, but Germany's goalkeeper Nadine Angerer made her second penalty save of the match. Anja Mittag's goal gave the Germans their sixth successive title.

Hansen's 2015 knee injury kept her out of that year's Algarve Cup, putting her in doubt for participation in the 2015 World Cup. It was made official on 19 May 2015, that she would be ruled out of the World Cup after failing to recover from the injury in time for the competition. Hansen made her national team comeback in January of the following year, scoring one of Norway's six goals against Romania.

Hansen was named to the national team squad ahead of the UEFA Euro 2017. Norway were drawn into a very difficult group made up of eventual tournament winners the Netherlands, eventual tournament runners-up Denmark, and Belgium. Their first match came against the Netherlands, where Norway were defeated 1–0. Following that loss, Norway then fell 2–0 to Belgium, where Hansen said after the match that she should've been awarded a penalty for being taken down in the box by Belgium's keeper. Norway moved on to the final match of the group stage, where they played Denmark. Prior to the match, Denmark's assistant coach criticized Hansen and Ada Hegerberg, saying that she "expected more of the two," and that her team's game plan was to shut down the pair of forwards. Denmark went up 1–0 just five minutes into the match, but just before halftime, Hegerberg drew a penalty that was taken and missed by Hansen. The match ended in another loss for Norway. At the end of it all, Norway scored zero goals, recording 3 losses, earning 0 points, and going out in the group stage of the tournament the first time since 1997. Their finish prompted the controversial national team retirement of Hegerberg, one of Hansen's longtime national team teammates, a decision that "surprised" Hansen. After the tournament, Hansen criticized the NFF for the lack of funding allocated to the women's team.

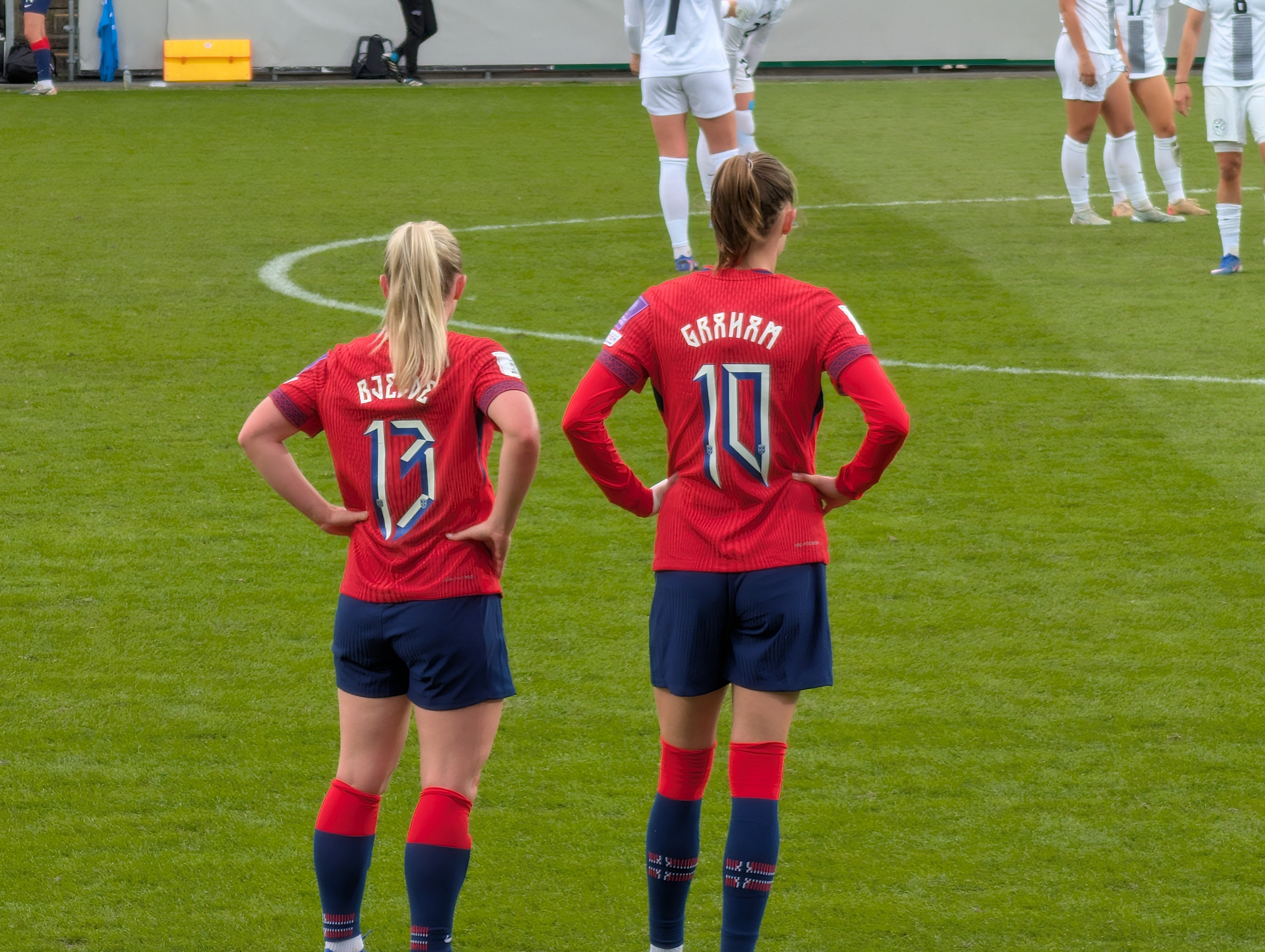
Thea Bjelde and Caroline Graham Hansen at Åråsen Stadion in 2026.

Norway's struggles continued into the group stages of qualification for the 2019 FIFA World Cup where they were defeated by the Netherlands from an extra-time header from Vivianne Miedema, where Hansen left the pitch in tears. The defeat put them at risk for not finishing first in their qualifying group, which could have potentially sent them to qualification playoffs. However, 7 straight wins including a much-needed win against the Dutch sent them to the top of the table, automatically qualifying them for the 2019 World Cup. Hansen scored 6 goals in 8 of Norway's qualifying matches. She also took up a captaincy role for the national team around this time, joining teammates Maren Mjelde and Ingrid Moe Wold.

In 2019, it was announced that she would represent Norway in the 2019 FIFA World Cup. This would later turn out to be a breakout tournament for Hansen, as she became the standout forward in Norway's first major international competition since the retirement of Ada Hegerberg in 2017. In the first match of the group stage, Norway faced Nigeria, where Hansen recorded an assist to Guro Reiten in Norway's first goal of the tournament. Norway won that match 3–0. In the final group stage match, Norway faced South Korea, where Hansen scored the penalty that sent Norway 1–0 up. The match ended 2–1 in Norway's favour, and they made it through to the Round of 16 with a second-place finish in Group A. She ended the match on crutches after taking a bad knock on her left ankle that resulted in a penalty kick for Norway. She played 65 minutes before she was taken out of the game and earned a Player of the Match award for her performance.

Despite her injury sustained against South Korea, Hansen played Australia in the Round of 16, where Norway won unexpectedly after going to a penalty shootout. She scored the first of Norway's 4 penalties and the shootout finished Norway 4–1 Australia. Hansen earned her second Player of the Match award of the tournament for her performance against the Aussies. Norway then advanced to the quarter-finals, where they were knocked out of the tournament by England. Despite exiting the tournament in the quarterfinals, she completed the most dribbles out of any other player.

On 19 June 2023, she was included in the 23-player Norwegian squad for the FIFA World Cup 2023.

On 16 June 2025, Hansen was called up to the Norway squad for the UEFA Euro 2025.

== Style of play ==
Hansen is a technically skilled winger, most known for her dribbling ability, one-on-one challenges, and passing quality.

In 2011, Hansen received the Statoil's Talent Award for the month of October. The award's jury, consisting of former Norway men's national team manager Nils Johan Semb and Norway women's youth national team manager Jarl Torske, revered 16-year-old Hansen for her skills on the ball. They highlighted her speed, her finishing, and her ability to challenge players one-on-one. Hansen's former manager at Wolfsburg, Stephan Lerch, describes her as "dominating a high-tempo game" and being very strong technically. Norway national team manager Martin Sjögren describes her similarly, saying her technical skills and speed are "exceptional."

Hansen has been described as an "atypical Norwegian," known for her dribbling skills and technical finesse unlike other Norwegians who tend to play more physically.

== Career statistics ==
=== Club ===
As of 26 January 2025

Appearances and goals by club, season and competition
Club	Season	League			Cup		Other		UWCL		Total	
Club	Season	Division	Apps	Goals	Apps	Goals	Apps	Goals	Apps	Goals	Apps	Goals
Stabæk	2010	Toppserien	7	1	0	0	–		0	0	7	1
Stabæk	2011	Toppserien	19	8	2 (Note: Appearances in Norwegian Women's Cup)	0	–		2	0	23	8
Stabæk	2012	Toppserien	21	7	5	4	–		3	0	29	11
Stabæk	2013	Toppserien	15	10	2	2	–		0	0	17	12
Stabæk	Total		62	26	9	6	–		5	0	76	32
Tyresö FF	2013	Damallsvenskan	7	3	1 (Note: Appearances in Svenska Cupen)	0	–		4	0	12	3
Stabæk	2014	Toppserien	9	2	1	1	–		0	0	10	3
Wolfsburg	2014–15	Frauen-Bundesliga	17	7	4 (Note: Appearances in DFB-Pokal)	2	–		6	2	27	11
Wolfsburg	2015–16	Frauen-Bundesliga	13	6	2	2	–		4	3	19	11
Wolfsburg	2016–17	Frauen-Bundesliga	16	6	3	1	–		4	1	23	8
Wolfsburg	2017–18	Frauen-Bundesliga	20	2	3	3	–		8	2	31	7
Wolfsburg	2018–19	Frauen-Bundesliga	22	8	4	4	–		6	2	27	12
Wolfsburg	Total		88	29	16	12	–		28	10	132	51
Barcelona	2019–20	Primera División	14	7	4 (Note: Appearances in Copa de la Reina)	2	2 (Note: Appearances in Supercopa de España)	1	6	0	26	10
Barcelona	2020–21	Primera División	23	8	1	0	1	0	9	3	34	11
Barcelona	2021–22	Primera División	23	6	1	0	2	3	9	2	35	11
Barcelona	2022–23	Primera División	13	11	0	0	0	0	6	2	19	13
Barcelona	2023–24	Primera División	25	21	3	3	2	3	10	5	40	32
Barcelona	2024–25	Primera División	23	11	4	0	2	2	9	3	38	16
Barcelona	Total		121	64	13	5	9	9	49	15	192	93
Career total			287	124	40	24	9	9	86	25	422	182

=== International ===
No.	Date	Venue	Opponent	Score	Result	Competition
1.	16 June 2012	Sarpsborg Stadion, Sarpsborg, Norway	Bulgaria	8–0	11–0	UEFA Women's Euro 2013 qualifying
2.	6 March 2013	Stadium Bela Vista, Parchal, Portugal	Japan	1–0	2–0	2013 Algarve Cup
3.	4 July 2013	Melløs Stadion, Moss, Norway	Russia	1–0	2–3	Friendly
4.	4 July 2013	Melløs Stadion, Moss, Norway	Russia	2–1	2–3	Friendly
5.	25 September 2013	Ullevaal Stadion, Oslo, Norway	Belgium	1–0	4–1	2015 FIFA Women's World Cup qualification
6.	26 October 2013	Sarpsborg Stadion, Sarpsborg, Norway	Albania	4–0	7–0	2015 FIFA Women's World Cup qualification
7.	26 October 2013	Sarpsborg Stadion, Sarpsborg, Norway	Albania	6–0	7–0	2015 FIFA Women's World Cup qualification
8.	26 October 2013	Sarpsborg Stadion, Sarpsborg, Norway	Albania	7–0	7–0	2015 FIFA Women's World Cup qualification
9.	30 October 2013	Kras Stadion, Volendam, Netherlands	Netherlands	1–0	2–1	2015 FIFA Women's World Cup qualification
10.	14 June 2014	Brann Stadion, Bergen, Norway	Greece	2–0	6–0	2015 FIFA Women's World Cup qualification
11.	11 September 2014	Niko Dovana Stadium, Durrës, Albania	Albania	3–0	11–0	2015 FIFA Women's World Cup qualification
12.	11 September 2014	Niko Dovana Stadium, Durrës, Albania	Albania	10–0	11–0	2015 FIFA Women's World Cup qualification
13.	22 January 2016	La Manga Club Football Stadium, La Manga, Spain	Romania	2–0	6–0	Friendly
14.	9 March 2016	Stadion Woudestein, Rotterdam, Netherlands	Switzerland	1–0	1–2	2016 UEFA Women's Olympic Qualifying Tournament
15.	15 September 2016	Aker Stadion, Molde, Norway	Kazakhstan	6–0	10–0	UEFA Women's Euro 2017 qualifying
16.	15 September 2017	Fredrikstad Stadion, Fredrikstad, Norway	Northern Ireland	2–0	4–1	2019 FIFA Women's World Cup qualification
17.	19 September 2017	Sarpsborg Stadion, Sarpsborg, Norway	Slovakia	4–0	6–1	2019 FIFA Women's World Cup qualification
18.	19 September 2017	Sarpsborg Stadion, Sarpsborg, Norway	Slovakia	6–0	6–1	2019 FIFA Women's World Cup qualification
19.	28 November 2017	Estadio Municipal de Marbella, Marbella, Spain	Canada	2–0	2–3	Friendly
20.	10 April 2018	Shamrock Park, Portadown, Northern Ireland	Northern Ireland	1–0	3–0	2019 FIFA Women's World Cup qualification
21.	10 April 2018	Shamrock Park, Portadown, Northern Ireland	Northern Ireland	2–0	3–0	2019 FIFA Women's World Cup qualification
22.	12 June 2018	Viking Stadion, Stavanger, Norway	Republic of Ireland	1–0	1–0	2019 FIFA Women's World Cup qualification
23.	17 January 2019	La Manga Club Football Stadium, La Manga, Spain	Scotland	1–0	3–1	Friendly
24.	17 January 2019	La Manga Club Football Stadium, La Manga, Spain	Scotland	3–1	3–1	Friendly
25.	6 March 2019	Bela Vista Municipal Stadium, Parchal, Portugal	Poland	2–0	3–0	2019 Algarve Cup
26.	17 June 2019	Stade Auguste-Delaune, Reims, France	South Korea	1–0	2–1	2019 FIFA Women's World Cup
27.	30 August 2019	Seaview, Belfast, Northern Ireland	Northern Ireland	2–0	6–0	UEFA Women's Euro 2022 qualifying
28.	30 August 2019	Seaview, Belfast, Northern Ireland	Northern Ireland	3–0	6–0	UEFA Women's Euro 2022 qualifying
29.	30 August 2019	Seaview, Belfast, Northern Ireland	Northern Ireland	4–0	6–0	UEFA Women's Euro 2022 qualifying
30.	3 September 2019	Brann Stadion, Bergen, Norway	England	2–1	2–1	Friendly
31.	4 October 2019	Borisov Arena, Barysaw, Belarus	Belarus	5–1	7–1	UEFA Women's Euro 2022 qualifying
32.	4 October 2019	Borisov Arena, Barysaw, Belarus	Belarus	7–1	7–1	UEFA Women's Euro 2022 qualifying
33.	8 October 2019	Tórsvøllur, Tórshavn, Faroe Islands	Faroe Islands	2–0	13–0	UEFA Women's Euro 2022 qualifying
34.	8 October 2019	Tórsvøllur, Tórshavn, Faroe Islands	Faroe Islands	4–0	13–0	UEFA Women's Euro 2022 qualifying
35.	8 October 2019	Tórsvøllur, Tórshavn, Faroe Islands	Faroe Islands	5–0	13–0	UEFA Women's Euro 2022 qualifying
36.	8 November 2019	Viking Stadion, Stavanger, Norway	Northern Ireland	5–0	6–0	UEFA Women's Euro 2022 qualifying
37.	8 November 2019	Viking Stadion, Stavanger, Norway	Northern Ireland	6–0	6–0	UEFA Women's Euro 2022 qualifying
38.	10 March 2020	Estádio Algarve, Faro, Portugal	New Zealand	2–1	2–1	2020 Algarve Cup
39.	16 September 2021	Ullevaal Stadion, Oslo, Norway	Armenia	2–0	10–0	2023 FIFA Women's World Cup qualification
40.	16 September 2021	Ullevaal Stadion, Oslo, Norway	Armenia	6–0	10–0	2023 FIFA Women's World Cup qualification
41.	16 September 2021	Ullevaal Stadion, Oslo, Norway	Armenia	10–0	10–0	2023 FIFA Women's World Cup qualification
42.	26 October 2021	Ullevaal Stadion, Oslo, Norway	Belgium	2–0	4–0	2023 FIFA Women's World Cup qualification
43.	12 April 2022	Ullevaal Stadion, Oslo, Norway	Poland	2–0	2–1	2023 FIFA Women's World Cup qualification
44.	7 July 2022	St Mary's Stadium, Southampton, England	Northern Ireland	3–0	4–1	UEFA Women's Euro 2022
45.	30 July 2023	Eden Park, Auckland, New Zealand	Philippines	3–0	6–0	2023 FIFA Women's World Cup
46.	23 February 2024	Opus Arena, Osijek, Croatia	Croatia	2–0	3–0	2023–24 UEFA Women's Nations League play-off matches
47.	16 July 2024	Brann Stadion, Bergen, Norway	Netherlands	1–0	1–1	UEFA Women's Euro 2025 qualifying
48.	29 November 2024	Inver Park, Larne, Northern Ireland	Northern Ireland	1–0	4–0	UEFA Women's Euro 2025 qualifying play-offs
49.	29 November 2024	Inver Park, Larne, Northern Ireland	Northern Ireland	3–0	4–0	UEFA Women's Euro 2025 qualifying play-offs
50.	3 December 2024	Ullevaal Stadion, Oslo, Norway	Northern Ireland	1–0	3–0	UEFA Women's Euro 2025 qualifying play-offs
51.	25 February 2025	Viking Stadion, Stavanger, Norway	Switzerland	2–1	2–1	2025 UEFA Women's Nations League
52.	6 July 2025	Stade de Tourbillon, Sion, Switzerland	Finland	2–1	2–1	UEFA Women's Euro 2025
53.	14 April 2026	Åråsen Stadion, Lillestrøm, Norway	Slovenia	3–0	5–0	2027 FIFA Women's World Cup qualification
54.	9 June 2026	Ullevaal Stadion, Oslo, Norway	Austria	2–0	2–1	2027 FIFA Women's World Cup qualification

== Honours ==
Stabæk

- Toppserien: 2010, 2013
- Norwegian Women's Cup: 2011, 2012, 2013

VfL Wolfsburg

- Frauen-Bundesliga: 2016–17, 2017–18, 2018–19
- DFB-Pokal: 2014–15, 2015–16, 2016–17, 2017–18, 2018–19

FC Barcelona

- Primera División: 2019–20, 2020–21, 2021–22, 2022–23, 2023–24, 2024–25, 2025–26
- Copa de la Reina: 2019–20, 2020–21, 2021–22, 2023–24, 2024–25, 2025–26
- Copa Catalunya: 2019
- Supercopa de España: 2019–20, 2021–22, 2023–24, 2024–25, 2025–26
- UEFA Women's Champions League: 2020–21, 2022–23, 2023–24, 2025–26

Individual

- Statoil Talent Award of the Year: 2012
- Gullballen – Best Norwegian Female Player of the Year: 2019, 2020, 2021, 2023, 2024
- Primera División MVP of the Season: 2020–21
- Primera División Top scorer: 2023–24
- Primera División Team of the Year: 2023–24, 2024–25
- The Best FIFA Football Awards Nominee: 2019, 2020
- UEFA Women's Champions League Squad of the Season: 2019–20, 2020–21, 2023–24
- IFFHS Women's World Team: 2021, 2024
- IFFHS Women's UEFA Team: 2021, 2024
- The Best FIFA Women's 11: 2024

Awards and recognition

In 2012, Hansen was awarded the Statoil Talent Award of the Year award, where the NFF and TV2 recognize Norway's single most talented male and female footballers of that year. She was awarded 50,000 kroner for her win, which she chose to donate to Stabæk.

In 2019, Hansen earned a nomination at that year's The Best FIFA awards, most notably for her performances with Norway at the 2019 FIFA Women's World Cup. She finished in 12th place alongside Sam Kerr with zero overall points. The following year, she was nominated for the award again, finishing 8th place with 15 points, the same amount as Barcelona teammate Jenni Hermoso.

In 2019, after her seasons for both club and country, she was named #13 in that year's GOAL50, an annual list of the 25 best male and female footballers awarded by online football publication GOAL. In 2020, Hansen rose seven places to #6 for GOAL50. She was also a nominee for the 2020 UEFA Team of the Year.

In 2018, Hansen made it to The Guardian's first list of The 100 Best Female Footballers In The World, coming in at #20. Hansen moved up 5 places to #15 in 2019, and the following year, she moved up 7 places as the 8th-best female footballer in the world.

Hansen has been nominated as a FIFA FIFPro Women's World11 finalist twice, once in 2019 and again in 2020.

In 2024 Hansen for the first time was nominated in the Ballon d'Or Féminin. She was ranked number two, only beaten by club mate and 2023-winner Aitana Bonmatí.

== See also ==
- List of women's footballers with 100 or more international caps
