= 2014 Expo Unity World Cup =

2014 Unity World Cup
Tournament details
- Host country: India
- Dates: 5–14 December 2014
- Teams: 8 (from 4 confederations)
- Venue(s): 5 (in 5 host cities)

Final positions
- Champions: Nigeria (1st title)
- Runners-up: Colombia

Tournament statistics
- Matches played: 15
- Goals scored: 47 (3.13 per match)
- Top scorer(s): (Nigeria) Adegboyega Adekunle Joseph (8 goals)

The Expo 2014 Unity World Cup was the 1st edition of the Unity World Cup, a biennial international men's amateur football championship, organised by the John Paul II Foundation for Sport. The tournament was played between 5 December and 14 December 2014 in Goa, India.

== Teams competing ==
Group A

- Brazil
- India
- Ghana
- Portugal

Group B

- Egypt
- Nigeria
- Colombia
- Uzbekistan

== Venues ==
The tournament was played at numerous venues across India, including Goa (which hosted the semi-finals and the final), Mumbai, Pune, Hyderabad and Bangalore.

== Group stage ==
All times are local, UTC+5:30.

=== Group A ===
Pos	Team	Pld	W	D	L	GF	GA	GD	Pts
1	Portugal	3	2	1	0	4	1	+3	7
2	India (H)	3	1	2	0	5	2	+3	5
3	Brazil	3	1	1	1	6	6	0	4
4	Ghana	3	0	0	3	2	9	−7	0

Source: Kolkata Football
(H) Hosts
5 December 2014

Brazil	2–2	India
Lucas ?', ?'		Vaz ?'; Devasigamani ?'

8 December 2014

Portugal	2–1	Ghana
Daniel Costa 17'; Cruze 25'	Report (Kolkata Football)	Tagoe ?'

8 December 2014

India	3–0	Ghana
Gonsalves 45' (pen.); Rodricks 62', 90'+2'	Report (Kolkata Football)

8 December 2014

Portugal	2–0	Brazil
Carino 16'; Cruze 45'	Report (Kolkata Football)

9 December 2014

Brazil	4–2	Ghana
Marcelo 7', 58'; Valmir 23'; Lucas 62'		Obed ?'; Eric ?'

9 December 2014

India	0–0	Portugal

=== Group B ===
Pos	Team	Pld	W	D	L	GF	GA	GD	Pts
1	Nigeria	3	3	0	0	12	0	+12	9
2	Colombia	3	2	0	1	3	4	−1	6
3	Egypt	3	1	0	2	3	4	−1	3
4	Uzbekistan	3	0	0	3	2	12	−10	0

Source: Kolkata Football
6 December 2014

Colombia	2–1	Uzbekistan
Temur 3'; Castanef 40'		Monkal 70'

7 December 2014

Uzbekistan	1–3	Egypt
Rinat 35'		Daniel 4', 20', 50'

7 December 2014

Colombia	0–3	Nigeria
		Isah Akor 32'; Sikiru 43'; Joseph 50'+2'

8 December 2014

Nigeria	2–0	Egypt
Isah Akor 7'; Joseph 25'

9 December 2014

Uzbekistan	0–7	Nigeria
		Akuneto 11', 61'; Chuks 19', 40'; Joseph 23', 27'; Chukwuma 52'

9 December 2014

Egypt	0–1	Colombia

== Knockout stage ==
If tied after regulation, extra time and, if necessary, penalty shoot-out would be used to decide the winner. All times are local, UTC+5:30.

=== Bracket ===
Semi-finals
11 December — Goa
India	0
Nigeria	1
12 December — Goa
Colombia	1
Portugal	0

Final
14 December — Goa
Colombia	0
Nigeria	7

=== Semi-finals ===
11 December 2014

India	0–1	Nigeria
		Joseph ?'

12 December 2014

Colombia	1–0	Portugal
Celis 34'

=== Final ===
14 December 2014

Colombia	0–7	Nigeria
		Joseph 10', 27', 29'; Sikiru 4', 25'; Ajibola ?'; Chuks ?'
