= Unity World Cup =

- Founded: 2014 (inaugural season)
- Region: Africa (CAF)
- Teams: 8
- Current champions: Brazil (1st title)
- Most championships: Nigeria; Brazil (1 title each)
- 2014 Expo Unity World Cup

The Unity World Cup is an international football competition contested by Christian national men's teams. Its name, unity, shows its will to unite the different Christians during a sports event. It is organized with the help of the John Paul II Foundation for sports.

Its inaugural tournament took place in Goa, Hyderabad and Bangalore (India) in 2014 and involved eight national teams. The second edition took place in Bogotá (Colombia) in 2016, with ten teams involved. The next competition will be played in Egypt in 2018.

== First edition: Goa 2014 ==
Eight nations participated.

=== Teams ===
Group A

- Brazil
- India
- Ghana
- Portugal

Group B

- Egypt
- Nigeria
- Colombia
- Uzbekistan

The Nigerian team won the tournament.

== Second edition: Bogotá 2016 ==
=== Teams ===
Group A

- Egypt
- Brazil
- Uzbekistan
- Ecuador
- Argentina

Group B

- Bolivia
- Colombia
- South Korea
- Germany
- Chile

Brazil won the tournament.
