= Brekete Family =

Human Rights Reality Radio and Television Program

- Founded: Started in 2009 by Ordinary Ahmed Isah in Nigeria
- Type: Non-profit; NGO
- Headquarters: Abuja
- Location: Nigeria
- Services: providing justice to oppressed, investigation, human rights promotion & protection, broadcasting.
- Fields: Human rights, investigative journalism, broadcasting, anti-corruption
- Founder: Ordinary Ahmed Isah
- Website: breketefamily.com

Brekete Family is a non-profit reality radio and television program focused on human rights. It airs on radio and cable television, and streams online through social media platforms and Human Rights Radio 101.1 in Abuja, Nigeria. The program is focused on protecting the rights of the downtrodden, helping to provide justice for the voiceless, and stimulating Nigerians to care for the oppressed.

== History and background ==
Brekete Family was founded by Ahmed Isah. The program first aired on Kiss FM Abuja in 2009, and then later on Crowther Love FM. Following its initial success, the program's headquarters, Human Rights Radio Abuja, was established. Brekete Family is known by Nigerians for seeking justice for the helpless. Beneficiaries of the broadcast have praised Brekete Family for empowering people in various ways, which include securing financial assistance. The program has blossomed into several other areas such as the Brekete Academy, where certified instructors offer courses in professional development in various fields.

The program is listened to by millions of ordinary Nigerians, government officials, politicians, law enforcement, and even foreigners. It is a place where people obtain public redress, facilitate arbitration, and has been used to raise funds for scholarship program for the poor, sick, or hungry.

The program is conducted in Pidgin English and features real-life issues and events concerning human rights. It has gained a wide acceptance and mass appeal, especially due to its nature of operation, similar to a community network. Hence, they reach out to the underprivileged, and intervene on behalf of the victims of daily human rights abuse.

In 2017, Brekete Family commissioned Human Rights Radio 101.1FM Abuja, the only human rights radio station in its entirety. The radio station, equipped with the 21st-century radio facilities, has attracted many government officials, international bodies, and even the poor masses.

On 29 October 2018, the vice president of Nigeria, Professor Yemi Osibanjo was on the live show of Brekete Family, making it the first reality radio show in Nigeria to feature her vice president.

== Vision ==
Located in Abuja, the Brekete Family Reality Radio and TV Talk Magazine is a non-profit organization that produces a live, daily program. Using investigation, dialogue, mediation, and advocacy, it helps Nigerians, especially low income population, to demand accountability and compensation for abuses. This organization supports Brekete's weekly program on electricity and education, which allow citizens to report corruption and seek redress. The project is expected to contribute to a reduction in corruption, especially retail corruption, and increase citizen participation in the new administration’s anti-corruption program. The Brekete Family vision portrays a free and better humanity for everyone, especially the oppressed and less privileged in the society.

== Mission ==
The mission of Brekete Family is to advocate for the rights of the oppressed and ordinary citizens in Nigeria. The motto of the program is "voice for the voiceless."

== Engagement ==
Brekete Family Radio is aired in Abuja, Nigeria and reaches five states in Nigeria. In 2014, it has an estimated daily listenership and viewership of 20 million people across the globe. Brekete Family was awarded a total of $865,000 between 2016 and 2019, including 2 grants in MacArthur Foundation's On Nigeria grant. It was awarded $300,000 in 2016 and $565,000 in 2019

2019 • 2 YEARS • ON NIGERIA

== Mediation ==
Brekete Family has resolved many complicated societal matters. This include broken marriages, families, warring societal groups and conflict between individual Nigerian citizens/organizations, federal, state, and local governments and their agencies.

== Controversies ==
1. Brekete Family show anchor, Ahmed Isah was under fire in 2021 for slapping a woman who allegedly set a child on fire during the Brekete Family show, which he later apologised for.
2. Dr. Fabian Benjamin, the Assistant Director of Joint Admissions and Matriculation Board(JAMB) sued Brekete Family show anchor, Ahmed Isah for Defamation and demanded 6 billion Naira from him.

== Investigation ==
Brekete Family is known for its deep investigation in cases of interest, such as serious crimes, human rights abuse, or corporate wrongdoing, in order to discover the truth and provide justice for the victims.

== Partnership ==
- Open Society Initiative for West Africa (OSIWA)
- Abdul PR Foundation
- MacArthur Foundation

== Funding ==
Berekete family raises funds from philanthropic donors and other non-profit organizations. The organization has raised over $565,000 in funding as of 2023.funding. Brekete family does not ask for support, however, should listeners or Brekete family members be moved to donate to a family or person featured on the program then this is allowed and all monies raised are dutifully handed over on air to the beneficiary.
