= Isah Umoru Akor =

Nigerian footballer (born 1991)

Personal information
- Date of birth: 1 November 1991 (age 35)
- Place of birth: Nigeria
- Height: 1.83 m (6 ft 0 in)
- Position: Striker

Team information
- Current team: MFM F.C.

Senior career*
Years	Team	Apps	(Gls)
–2012	Prime		
2012–2014	Heartland		
2014–2016	U.D. Leiria	7	(0)
2016–	MFM F.C.		
- * Club domestic league appearances and goals as of 7 January 2017

Isah Umoru Akor is a Nigerian professional footballer, who plays as a striker for Nigerian side MFM F.C.

== Club career ==
Akor started his career in his homeland of Nigeria with Prime F.C., where he scored seven goals in six games during the 2012 Federation Cup. In 2012, he signed for Heartland in the Nigeria Premier League. where he continued his prolific goal-scoring form. He moved to Portuguese side U.D. Leiria in 2014, after unsuccessful trials at Norwegian side Stabæk and Polish club Wisła Kraków. He made his debut for Os Lis in a 2-1 loss to Sertanense. He made 7 appearances in his time there, all in the Campeonato de Portugal.

In 2016, Akor returned to Nigeria with MFM F.C., where he vowed he would not celebrate if he scored against former side Heartland.

== International career ==
Although never called up to the full Nigerian national football team, Akor was called up for the preliminary Nigeria national beach soccer team, but did not compete at the 2013 African Beach Soccer Championship for personal reasons. He also represented a Nigeria XI that competed at the 2014 Expo Unity World Cup in Goa.
