= Ahmed Isah =

Nigerian activist and radio personality

- Born: Idanre, Ondo State, Nigeria
- Other names: Ordinary President; Ordinary Ahmed
- Occupation: Human rights activist
- Years active: 2009 — present
- Known for: Anchor of Brekete Family

Ahmed Isah is a Nigerian activist and radio personality who is known chiefly as the anchor of Brekete Family, a radio programme that runs on Human Rights Radio.

== Biography ==
Isah was born in Idanre in Ondo State. He founded Brekete Family which first aired on Kiss FM. On 17 May 2021, BBC's investigative journalist Peter Nkanga made a documentary about an assault made by Isah against a woman who abused a child. Following the report, Isah apologised citing that he has anger issues. Few days later following the report, Isah was detained by the Nigerian Police in Abuja, and his broadcasting license was revoked by the National Broadcasting Commission. Mohammed Eibo Namiji writing for Blueprint said that the backlash was a conspiracy theory against Isah. He was later released from detention.

In January 2022, Fabian Benjamin, a JAMB official sued Isah for defamation with ₦6 billion damage.
