= FIFA Puskás Award =

International football award

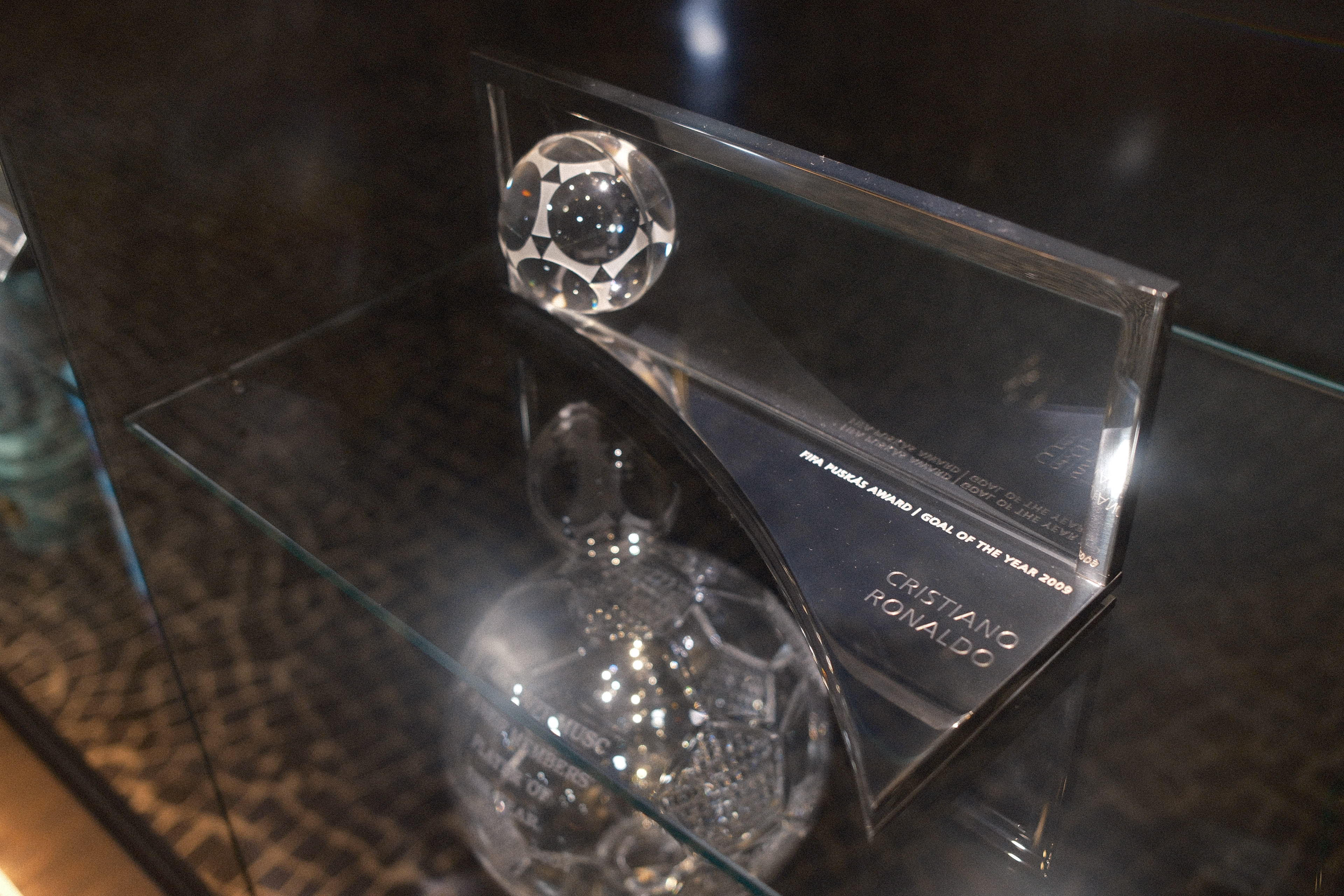
FIFA Puskás Award

The FIFA Puskás Award [ˈpuʃkaːʃ] is an award established on 20 October 2009 by the Fédération Internationale de Football Association (FIFA), at the behest of then-president Sepp Blatter, to be awarded to the player judged to have scored the most aesthetically significant, or "most beautiful", goal of the calendar year. The Puskás Award is announced yearly and is considered by voting. From 2024, only male players are eligible to win, with the FIFA Marta Award established for female players instead.

The award is in honour of Ferenc Puskás, the striker of Real Madrid during the late 1950s to the late 1960s, and central member of the highly successful Hungarian side of the same era. Puskás is widely considered by many to be the most powerful and prolific forward Europe produced in first-division football and was honoured by IFFHS in 1997 as the best top-tier goalscorer of the 20th century. Puskás scored 806 goals in 793 games and his 86 national team goals in 90 outings was a world record at the time.

The annual award was presented for the first time during the 2009 FIFA World Player of the Year Gala on 21 December in Switzerland, with Portuguese player Cristiano Ronaldo as the first prize winner. There have been 17 award winners since 2009. As of July 2026, no player has won the award twice.

== Award criteria and procedure ==
=== Criteria ===
The criteria for the award are:

- The goal should be "aesthetically beautiful".
- The goal should be scored without the result of luck or a mistake.
- The goal should be in support of fair play.
- The goal should be judged without distinction of championship or nationality.

=== Procedure ===
FIFA nominates eleven goals each year for voting. Voting is done by two groups: registered users on FIFA's website, and a panel of experts appointed by FIFA. Each individual in both groups selects their top three goals, assigning five points to the first, three points to the second, and one point to the third. Following the first vote, the totals from fans and Legends are used to rank the eleven goals individually inside their respective categories. Based on these rankings, each group assigns “scoring points” to the goals, with the first-ranked goal receiving thirteen points, the second getting eleven, the third nine, and so on down to one point for the eleventh. For each goal, the scoring points from the fan group and the FIFA Legends group are added together, and the goal with the highest combined score is awarded the Puskás Award.

== Winners and nominees ==
Scores and results list the player's club goal tally first.

=== 2009 ===
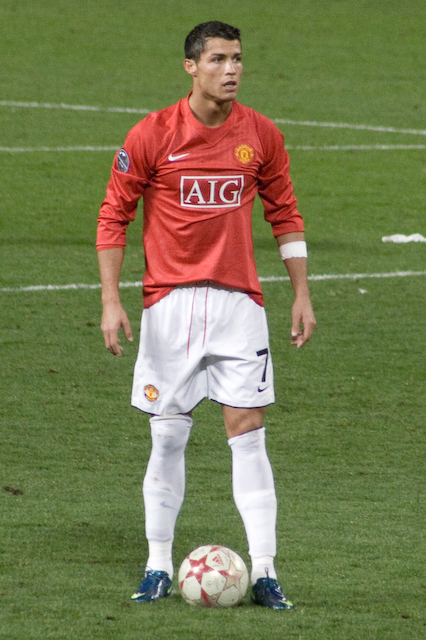
Cristiano Ronaldo was the first recipient of the award for his long-range goal for Manchester United against Porto from 40 yards out. Former Dutch international Ruud Gullit called it a "strike", while Sir Alex Ferguson — Manchester United manager at the time — said, "I would have to go a long way back in the memory bank to find another one like that!"

Rank	Player	Team	Opponent	Score	Competition	Vote percentage
1st	(Portugal) Cristiano Ronaldo	(England) Manchester United	(Portugal) Porto	1–0	2008–09 UEFA Champions League	17.68%
2nd	(Spain) Andrés Iniesta	(Spain) Barcelona	(England) Chelsea	1–1	2008–09 UEFA Champions League	15.64%
3rd	(Brazil) Grafite	(Germany) VfL Wolfsburg	(Germany) Bayern Munich	5–1	2008–09 Bundesliga	13.39%
4th	(Israel) Eliran Atar	(Israel) Bnei Yehuda	(Israel) Maccabi Netanya	1–1	2008–09 Israeli Premier League	13.36%
5th	(Spain) Fernando Torres	(England) Liverpool	(England) Blackburn Rovers	4–0	2008–09 Premier League	9.44%
6th	(Brazil) Nilmar	(Brazil) Internacional	(Brazil) Corinthians	1–0	2009 Campeonato Brasileiro Série A	8.71%
7th	(Ghana) Michael Essien	(England) Chelsea	(Spain) Barcelona	1–0	2008–09 UEFA Champions League	7.89%
8th	(Mexico) Luis Ángel Landín	(Mexico) Cruz Azul	(Mexico) Morelia	1–1	Liga MX Clausura 2009	7.30%
9th	(Togo) Emmanuel Adebayor	(England) Arsenal	(Spain) Villarreal	1–1	2008–09 UEFA Champions League	4.04%
10th	(South Africa) Katlego Mphela	South Africa	Spain	2–2	2009 FIFA Confederations Cup	2.59%

=== 2010 ===
Rank	Player	Team	Opponent	Score	Competition	Vote percentage
1st	(Turkey) Hamit Altıntop	Turkey	Kazakhstan	2–0	UEFA Euro 2012 qualification	40.55%
2nd	(Sweden) Linus Hallenius	(Sweden) Hammarby IF	(Sweden) Syrianska FC	2–0	2010 Superettan	13.23%
3rd	(Netherlands) Giovanni van Bronckhorst	Netherlands	Uruguay	1–0	2010 FIFA World Cup	10.61%
Unranked	(Northern Ireland) Matty Burrows	(Northern Ireland) Glentoran	(Northern Ireland) Portadown	1–0	2010–11 IFA Premiership	N/A
Unranked	(Argentina) Lionel Messi	(Spain) Barcelona	(Spain) Valencia	3–0	2009–10 La Liga	N/A
Unranked	(France) Samir Nasri	(England) Arsenal	(Portugal) Porto	3–0	2009–10 UEFA Champions League	N/A
Unranked	(Brazil) Neymar	(Brazil) Santos	(Brazil) Santo André	2–1	2010 Campeonato Paulista	N/A
Unranked	(Netherlands) Arjen Robben	(Germany) Bayern Munich	(Germany) Schalke 04	1–0	2009–10 DFB-Pokal	N/A
Unranked	(South Africa) Siphiwe Tshabalala	South Africa	Mexico	1–0	2010 FIFA World Cup	N/A
Unranked	(Japan) Kumi Yokoyama	Japan	North Korea	2–1	2010 FIFA U-17 Women's World Cup	N/A

=== 2011 ===
Rank	Player	Team	Opponent	Score	Competition
1st	(Brazil) Neymar	(Brazil) Santos	(Brazil) Flamengo	3–0	2011 Campeonato Brasileiro Série A
2nd	(Argentina) Lionel Messi	(Spain) Barcelona	(England) Arsenal	3–1	2010–11 UEFA Champions League
3rd	(England) Wayne Rooney	(England) Manchester United	(England) Manchester City	2–1	2010–11 Premier League
Unranked	(Belgium) Benjamin De Ceulaer	(Belgium) Lokeren	(Belgium) Club Brugge	1–2	2011–12 Belgian Pro League
Unranked	(Mexico) Giovani dos Santos	Mexico	United States	4–2	2011 CONCACAF Gold Cup
Unranked	(Mexico) Julio Gómez	Mexico	Germany	3–2	2011 FIFA U-17 World Cup
Unranked	(Sweden) Zlatan Ibrahimović	(Italy) Milan	(Italy) Lecce	1–0	2010–11 Serie A
Unranked	(Argentina) Lisandro López	(Argentina) Arsenal de Sarandí	(Argentina) Olimpo	2–2	Argentine Primera División Apertura 2011
Unranked	(United States) Heather O'Reilly	United States	Colombia	1–0	2011 FIFA Women's World Cup
Unranked	(Serbia) Dejan Stanković	(Italy) Inter Milan	(Germany) Schalke 04	1–0	2010–11 UEFA Champions League

=== 2012 ===
Rank	Player	Team	Opponent	Score	Competition	Vote percentage
1st	(Slovakia) Miroslav Stoch	(Turkey) Fenerbahçe	(Turkey) Gençlerbirliği	6–1	2011–12 Süper Lig	78%
2nd	(Colombia) Radamel Falcao	(Spain) Atlético Madrid	(Colombia) América de Cali	1–0	Club friendly	15%
3rd	(Brazil) Neymar	(Brazil) Santos	(Brazil) Internacional	2–0	2012 Copa Libertadores	7%
Unranked	(Ghana) Emmanuel Badu	Ghana	Guinea	1–0	2012 Africa Cup of Nations	N/A
Unranked	(France) Hatem Ben Arfa	(England) Newcastle United	(England) Blackburn Rovers	1–1	2011–12 FA Cup	N/A
Unranked	(France) Eric Hassli	(Canada) Vancouver Whitecaps	(Canada) Toronto FC	1–1	2012 Canadian Championship	N/A
Unranked	(Mexico) Olivia Jiménez	Mexico	Switzerland	2–0	2012 FIFA U-20 Women's World Cup	N/A
Unranked	(Bolivia) Gastón Mealla	(Bolivia) Nacional Potosí	(Bolivia) The Strongest	2–2	2011–12 Liga de Fútbol Profesional Boliviano	N/A
Unranked	(Argentina) Lionel Messi	Argentina	Brazil	4–3	International friendly	N/A
Unranked	(Senegal) Moussa Sow	(Turkey) Fenerbahçe	(Turkey) Galatasaray	1–0	2011–12 Süper Lig	N/A

=== 2013 ===
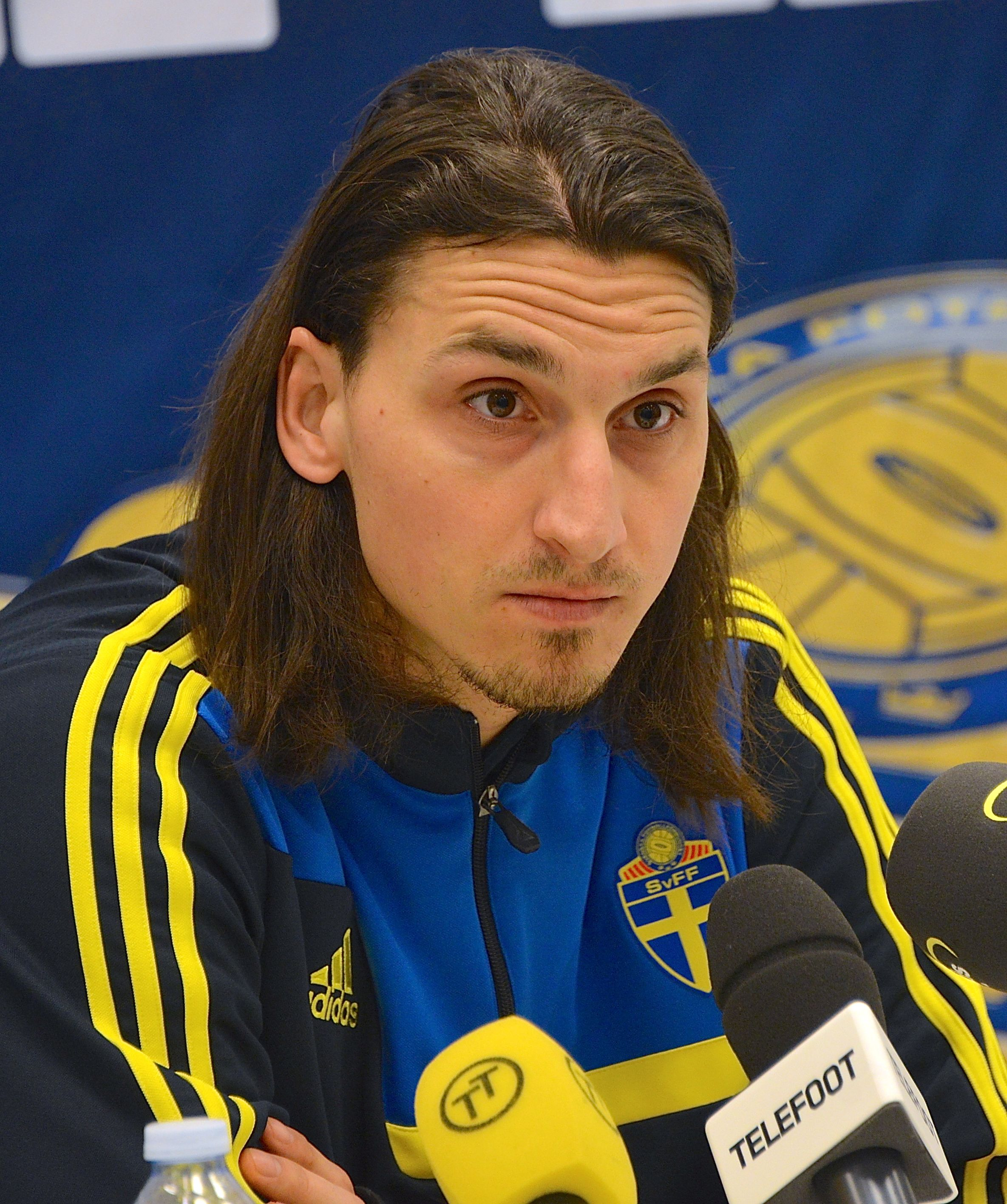
Zlatan Ibrahimović's 35-yard overhead kick with his back to goal won him praise from players and pundits, with the BBC describing it as a goal that "combined unfathomable imagination and expert technique".

The following list includes the nominees for the 2013 award. Voting was possible through the FIFA.com website until 9 December 2013, after a second voting round was held between the top three goals from the first round. The award to the winning goal from the second round was presented on 13 January 2014.

Rank	Player	Team	Opponent	Score	Competition	Vote percentage
1st	(Sweden) Zlatan Ibrahimović	Sweden	England	4–2	International friendly	48.7%
2nd	(Serbia) Nemanja Matić	(Portugal) Benfica	(Portugal) Porto	1–1	2012–13 Primeira Liga	30.8%
3rd	(Brazil) Neymar	Brazil	Japan	1–0	2013 FIFA Confederations Cup	20.5%
Unranked	(Denmark) Peter Ankersen	(Denmark) Esbjerg	(Denmark) Aarhus	5–1	2013–14 Danish Superliga	N/A
Unranked	(France) Louisa Cadamuro	(France) Lyon	(France) Saint-Étienne	5–0	2012–13 Division 1 Féminine	N/A
Unranked	(Australia) Lisa De Vanna	(United States) Sky Blue	(United States) Boston Breakers	5–1	2013 National Women's Soccer League	N/A
Unranked	(Italy) Antonio Di Natale	(Italy) Udinese	(Italy) Chievo	3–1	2012–13 Serie A	N/A
Unranked	(Greece) Panagiotis Kone	(Italy) Bologna	(Italy) Napoli	2–3	2012–13 Serie A	N/A
Unranked	(Argentina) Daniel Ludueña	(Mexico) Pachuca	(Mexico) UANL	2–1	Liga MX Apertura 2013	N/A
Unranked	(Uruguay) Juan Manuel Olivera	(Brazil) Náutico	(Brazil) Sport Recife	2–0	2013 Copa Sudamericana	N/A

=== 2014 ===
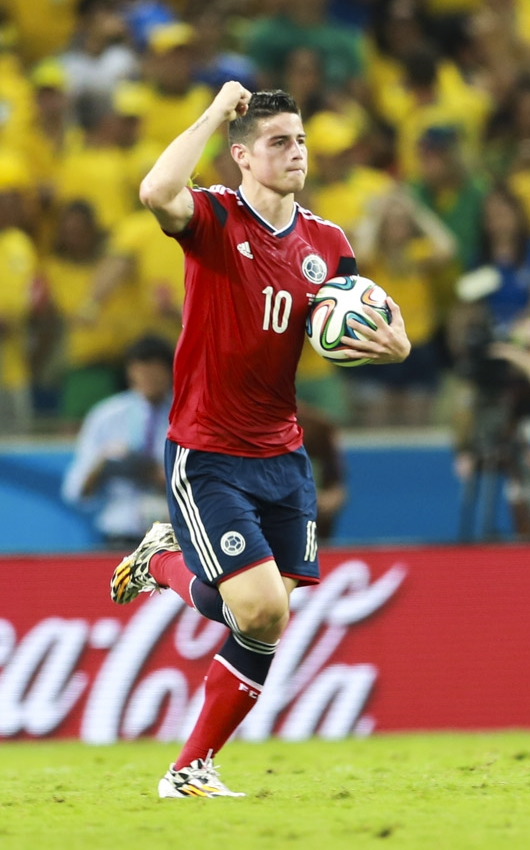
James Rodríguez's volley was described as "one of the greatest goals the World Cup has ever seen" by Uruguayan manager Óscar Tabárez, who also called Rodríguez "the best player in the World Cup".

FIFA announced the list of 10 nominees on 12 November 2014.

Rank	Player	Team	Opponent	Score	Competition	Vote percentage
1st	(Colombia) James Rodríguez	Colombia	Uruguay	1–0	2014 FIFA World Cup	42%
2nd	(Republic of Ireland) Stephanie Roche	(Republic of Ireland) Peamount United	(Republic of Ireland) Wexford Youths	2–0	2013–14 Women's National League	33%
3rd	(Netherlands) Robin van Persie	Netherlands	Spain	1–1	2014 FIFA World Cup	11%
Unranked	(Australia) Tim Cahill	Australia	Netherlands	1–1	2014 FIFA World Cup	N/A
Unranked	(Spain) Diego Costa	(Spain) Atlético Madrid	(Spain) Getafe	5–0	2013–14 La Liga	N/A
Unranked	(Mexico) Marco Fabián	(Mexico) Cruz Azul	(Mexico) Puebla	1–0	Liga MX Clausura 2014	N/A
Unranked	(Sweden) Zlatan Ibrahimović	(France) Paris Saint-Germain	(France) Bastia	1–0	2013–14 Ligue 1	N/A
Unranked	(Switzerland) Pajtim Kasami	(England) Fulham	(England) Crystal Palace	1–1	2013–14 Premier League	N/A
Unranked	(Brazil) Camilo Sanvezzo	(Canada) Vancouver Whitecaps	(United States) Portland Timbers	2–2	2013 Major League Soccer	N/A
Unranked	(Japan) Hisato Satō	(Japan) Sanfrecce Hiroshima	(Japan) Kawasaki Frontale	2–1	2014 J.League Division 1	N/A

=== 2015 ===
FIFA announced the list of 10 nominees on 12 November 2015.

Rank	Player	Team	Opponent	Score	Competition	Vote percentage
1st	(Brazil) Wendell Lira	(Brazil) Goianésia	(Brazil) Atlético Goianiense	1–0	2015 Campeonato Goiano	46.7%
2nd	(Argentina) Lionel Messi	(Spain) Barcelona	(Spain) Athletic Bilbao	1–0	2014–15 Copa del Rey	33.3%
3rd	(Italy) Alessandro Florenzi	(Italy) Roma	(Spain) Barcelona	1–1	2015–16 UEFA Champions League	7.1%
Unranked	(England) David Ball	(England) Fleetwood Town	(England) Preston North End	2–2	2014–15 League One	N/A
Unranked	(Uruguay) Chory Castro	(Spain) Real Sociedad	(Spain) Deportivo La Coruña	2–1	2014–15 La Liga	N/A
Unranked	(United States) Carli Lloyd	United States	Japan	4–0	2015 FIFA Women's World Cup	N/A
Unranked	(France) Philippe Mexès	(Italy) Milan	(Italy) Inter Milan	1–0	2015 International Champions Cup	N/A
Unranked	(Cameroon) Marcel Ndjeng	(Germany) SC Paderborn	(England) Bolton Wanderers	3–1	Club friendly	N/A
Unranked	(Costa Rica) Esteban Ramírez	(Costa Rica) Herediano	(Costa Rica) Saprissa	3–2	Liga FPD Invierno 2014	N/A
Unranked	(Argentina) Carlos Tevez	(Italy) Juventus	(Italy) Parma	4–0	2014–15 Serie A	N/A

=== 2016 ===
FIFA announced the list of 10 nominees on 21 November 2016.

Rank	Player	Team	Opponent	Score	Competition	Vote percentage
1st	(Malaysia) Mohd Faiz Subri	(Malaysia) Penang	(Malaysia) Pahang	4–1	2016 Malaysia Super League	59.46%
2nd	(Brazil) Marlone	(Brazil) Corinthians	(Chile) Cobresal	3–0	2016 Copa Libertadores	22.86%
3rd	(Venezuela) Daniuska Rodríguez	Venezuela	Colombia	1–0	2016 South American U-17 Women's Championship	10.01%
Unranked	(Spain) Mario Gaspar	Spain	England	1–0	International friendly	N/A
Unranked	(South Africa) Hlompho Kekana	South Africa	Cameroon	2–1	2017 Africa Cup of Nations qualification	N/A
Unranked	(Argentina) Lionel Messi	Argentina	United States	2–0	Copa América Centenario	N/A
Unranked	(Brazil) Neymar	(Spain) Barcelona	(Spain) Villarreal	3–0	2015–16 La Liga	N/A
Unranked	(Wales) Hal Robson-Kanu	Wales	Belgium	2–1	UEFA Euro 2016	N/A
Unranked	(Spain) Saúl	(Spain) Atlético Madrid	(Germany) Bayern Munich	1–0	2015–16 UEFA Champions League	N/A
Unranked	(Finland) Simon Skrabb	(Sweden) Åtvidabergs FF	(Sweden) Gefle IF	1–0	2015 Allsvenskan	N/A

=== 2017 ===
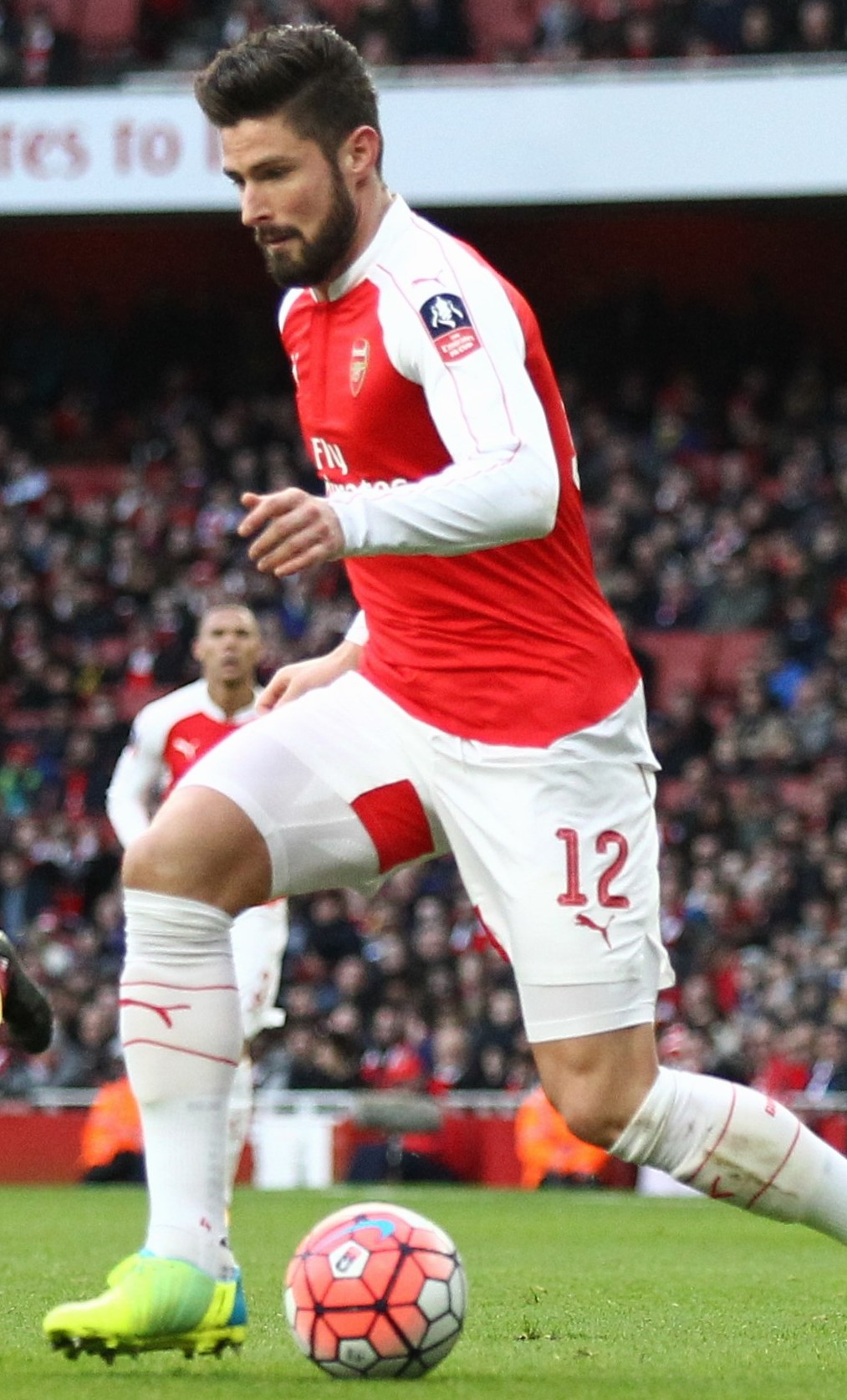
Olivier Giroud's backheeled "scorpion kick" volley was described by then-Arsenal manager Arsène Wenger as one of the five best in his Arsenal reign.

FIFA announced the list of 10 nominees on 22 September 2017.

Rank	Player	Team	Opponent	Score	Competition	Vote percentage
1st	(France) Olivier Giroud	(England) Arsenal	(England) Crystal Palace	1–0	2016–17 Premier League	36.17%
2nd	(South Africa) Oscarine Masuluke	(South Africa) Baroka	(South Africa) Orlando Pirates	1–1	2016–17 South African Premier Division	27.48%
3rd	(Venezuela) Deyna Castellanos	Venezuela	Cameroon	2–1	2016 FIFA U-17 Women's World Cup	20.47%
Unranked	(Ghana) Kevin-Prince Boateng	(Spain) Las Palmas	(Spain) Villarreal	1–0	2016–17 La Liga	N/A
Unranked	(Argentina) Alejandro Camargo	(Chile) Universidad de Concepción	(Chile) O'Higgins	3–1	Chilean Primera División Apertura 2016	N/A
Unranked	(France) Moussa Dembélé	(Scotland) Celtic	(Scotland) St Johnstone	5–2	2016–17 Scottish Premiership	N/A
Unranked	(Colombia) Avilés Hurtado	(Mexico) Tijuana	(Mexico) Atlas	1–1	Liga MX Clausura 2017	N/A
Unranked	(Croatia) Mario Mandžukić	(Italy) Juventus	(Spain) Real Madrid	1–1	2016–17 UEFA Champions League	N/A
Unranked	(Serbia) Nemanja Matić	(England) Chelsea	(England) Tottenham Hotspur	4–2	2016–17 FA Cup	N/A
Unranked	(Spain) Jordi Mboula	(Spain) Barcelona	(Germany) Borussia Dortmund	4–1	2016–17 UEFA Youth League	N/A

=== 2018 ===
FIFA announced the list of 10 nominees on 3 September 2018.

Rank	Player	Team	Opponent	Score	Competition	Vote percentage
1st	(Egypt) Mohamed Salah	(England) Liverpool	(England) Everton	1–0	2017–18 Premier League	38%
2nd	(Portugal) Cristiano Ronaldo	(Spain) Real Madrid	(Italy) Juventus	2–0	2017–18 UEFA Champions League	22%
3rd	(Uruguay) Giorgian de Arrascaeta	(Brazil) Cruzeiro	(Brazil) América Mineiro	1–0	2018 Campeonato Mineiro	17%
Unranked	(Wales) Gareth Bale	(Spain) Real Madrid	(England) Liverpool	2–1	2017–18 UEFA Champions League	23%
Unranked	(Russia) Denis Cheryshev	Russia	Croatia	1–0	2018 FIFA World Cup	23%
Unranked	(Greece) Lazaros Christodoulopoulos	(Greece) AEK Athens	(Greece) Olympiacos	2–2	2017–18 Super League Greece	23%
Unranked	(Australia) Riley McGree	(Australia) Newcastle Jets	(Australia) Melbourne City	1–1	2017–18 A-League	23%
Unranked	(Argentina) Lionel Messi	Argentina	Nigeria	1–0	2018 FIFA World Cup	23%
Unranked	(France) Benjamin Pavard	France	Argentina	2–2	2018 FIFA World Cup	23%
Unranked	(Portugal) Ricardo Quaresma	Portugal	Iran	1–0	2018 FIFA World Cup	23%

=== 2019 ===
FIFA announced the list of 10 nominees on 19 August 2019.

Rank	Player	Team	Opponent	Score	Competition
1st	(Hungary) Dániel Zsóri	(Hungary) Debrecen	(Hungary) Ferencváros	2–1	2018–19 Nemzeti Bajnokság I
2nd	(Argentina) Lionel Messi	(Spain) Barcelona	(Spain) Real Betis	4–1	2018–19 La Liga
3rd	(Colombia) Juan Fernando Quintero	(Argentina) River Plate	(Argentina) Racing	1–0	2018–19 Superliga Argentina
Unranked	(Brazil) Matheus Cunha	(Germany) RB Leipzig	(Germany) Bayer Leverkusen	4–2	2018–19 Bundesliga
Unranked	(Sweden) Zlatan Ibrahimović	(United States) LA Galaxy	(Canada) Toronto FC	1–3	2018 Major League Soccer
Unranked	(Cameroon) Ajara Nchout	Cameroon	New Zealand	2–1	2019 FIFA Women's World Cup
Unranked	(Italy) Fabio Quagliarella	(Italy) Sampdoria	(Italy) Napoli	3–0	2018–19 Serie A
Unranked	(United States) Amy Rodriguez	(United States) Utah Royals FC	(United States) Sky Blue FC	1–0	2019 National Women's Soccer League
Unranked	(Northern Ireland) Billie Simpson	(Northern Ireland) Cliftonville Ladies	(Northern Ireland) Sion Swifts Ladies	1–2	2018 Women's Premiership
Unranked	(England) Andros Townsend	(England) Crystal Palace	(England) Manchester City	2–1	2018–19 Premier League

=== 2020 ===
FIFA announced the list of 11 nominees on 25 November 2020.

Rank	Player	Team	Opponent	Score	Competition	Points
1st	(South Korea) Son Heung-min	(England) Tottenham Hotspur	(England) Burnley	3–0	2019–20 Premier League	24
2nd	(Uruguay) Giorgian de Arrascaeta	(Brazil) Flamengo	(Brazil) Ceará	3–0	2019 Campeonato Brasileiro Série A	22
3rd	(Uruguay) Luis Suárez	(Spain) Barcelona	(Spain) Mallorca	4–1	2019–20 La Liga	20
Unranked	(Costa Rica) Shirley Cruz	Costa Rica	Panama	3–1	2020 CONCACAF Women's Olympic Qualifying Championship	N/A
Unranked	(England) Jordan Flores	(Republic of Ireland) Dundalk	(Republic of Ireland) Shamrock Rovers	2–3	2020 League of Ireland Premier Division	N/A
Unranked	(France) André-Pierre Gignac	(Mexico) UANL	(Mexico) UNAM	3–0	Liga MX Clausura 2020	N/A
Unranked	(Wales) Sophie Ingle	(England) Chelsea	(England) Arsenal	3–0	2019–20 FA WSL	N/A
Unranked	(Austria) Zlatko Junuzović	(Austria) Red Bull Salzburg	(Austria) Rapid Wien	6–1	2019–20 Austrian Bundesliga	N/A
Unranked	(South Africa) Hlompho Kekana	(South Africa) Mamelodi Sundowns	(South Africa) Cape Town City	1–0	2019–20 South African Premier Division	N/A
Unranked	(Ecuador) Leonel Quiñónez	(Ecuador) Macará	(Ecuador) Universidad Católica	1–0	2019 LigaPro Serie A	N/A
Unranked	(Scotland) Caroline Weir	(England) Manchester City	(England) Manchester United	1–0	2019–20 FA WSL	N/A

=== 2021 ===
FIFA announced the list of 11 nominees on 17 January 2022.

Rank	Player	Team	Opponent	Score	Competition	Points
1st	(Argentina) Erik Lamela	(England) Tottenham Hotspur	(England) Arsenal	1–0	2020–21 Premier League	22
2nd	(Iran) Mehdi Taremi	(Portugal) Porto	(England) Chelsea	1–0	2020–21 UEFA Champions League	21
3rd	(Czech Republic) Patrik Schick	Czech Republic	Scotland	2–0	UEFA Euro 2020	21
Unranked	(Colombia) Luis Díaz	Colombia	Brazil	1–0	2021 Copa América	N/A
Unranked	(France) Gauthier Hein	(France) Auxerre	(France) Niort	3–0	2020–21 Ligue 2	N/A
Unranked	(Austria) Valentino Lazaro	(Germany) Borussia Mönchengladbach	(Germany) Bayer Leverkusen	3–4	2020–21 Bundesliga	N/A
Unranked	(Algeria) Riyad Mahrez	Algeria	Zimbabwe	2–0	2021 Africa Cup of Nations qualification	N/A
Unranked	(Ghana) Sandra Owusu-Ansah	(Ghana) Supreme Ladies	(Ghana) Kumasi Sports Academy Ladies	1–1	2020–21 Ghana Women's Premier League	N/A
Unranked	(Greece) Vangelis Pavlidis	(Netherlands) Willem II	(Netherlands) Fortuna Sittard	1–0	2020–21 Eredivisie	N/A
Unranked	(Mexico) Daniela Sánchez	(Mexico) Querétaro	(Mexico) Atlético San Luis	3–2	Liga MX Femenil Guardianes 2021	N/A
Unranked	(Scotland) Caroline Weir	(England) Manchester City	(England) Manchester United	3–0	2020–21 FA WSL	N/A

=== 2022 ===
FIFA announced the list of 11 nominees on 12 January 2023.

Rank	Player	Team	Opponent	Score	Competition	Points
1st	(Poland) Marcin Oleksy	(Poland) Warta Poznań	(Poland) Stal Rzeszów	1–0	2022 PZU Amp Futbol Ekstraklasa	21
2nd	(France) Dimitri Payet	(France) Marseille	(Greece) PAOK	2–0	2021–22 UEFA Europa Conference League	20
3rd	(Brazil) Richarlison	Brazil	Serbia	2–0	2022 FIFA World Cup	17
Unranked	(Italy) Mario Balotelli	(Turkey) Adana Demirspor	(Turkey) Göztepe	7–0	2021–22 Süper Lig	N/A
Unranked	(Argentina) Francisco González Metilli	(Argentina) Central Córdoba	(Argentina) Rosario Central	1–0	2022 AFA Liga Profesional de Fútbol	N/A
Unranked	(France) Amandine Henry	(France) Lyon	(Spain) Barcelona	1–0	2021–22 UEFA Women's Champions League	N/A
Unranked	(France) Théo Hernandez	(Italy) Milan	(Italy) Atalanta	2–0	2021–22 Serie A	N/A
Unranked	(Australia) Alou Kuol	Australia	Iraq	1–0	2022 AFC U-23 Asian Cup	N/A
Unranked	(France) Kylian Mbappé	France	Argentina	2–2	2022 FIFA World Cup	N/A
Unranked	(Spain) Salma Paralluelo	(Spain) Villarreal	(Spain) Barcelona	1–0	2021–22 Liga F	N/A
Unranked	(England) Alessia Russo	England	Sweden	3–0	UEFA Women's Euro 2022	N/A

=== 2023 ===
FIFA announced the list of 11 nominees on 22 September 2023.

Rank	Player	Team	Opponent	Score	Competition	Points
1st	(Brazil) Guilherme Madruga	(Brazil) Botafogo-SP	(Brazil) Novorizontino	1–0	2023 Campeonato Brasileiro Série B	22
2nd	(Portugal) Nuno Santos	(Portugal) Sporting CP	(Portugal) Boavista	1–0	2022–23 Primeira Liga	18
3rd	(Paraguay) Julio Enciso	(England) Brighton & Hove Albion	(England) Manchester City	1–1	2022–23 Premier League	17
Unranked	(Argentina) Álvaro Barreal	(United States) FC Cincinnati	(United States) Pittsburgh Riverhounds	2–0	2023 U.S. Open Cup	N/A
Unranked	(Colombia) Linda Caicedo	Colombia	Germany	1–0	2023 FIFA Women's World Cup	N/A
Unranked	(South Korea) Kang Seong-jin	South Korea	Jordan	2–0	2023 AFC U-20 Asian Cup	N/A
Unranked	(Australia) Sam Kerr	Australia	England	1–1	2023 FIFA Women's World Cup	N/A
Unranked	(Uruguay) Brian Lozano	(Mexico) Atlas	(Mexico) América	2–2	Liga MX Clausura 2023	N/A
Unranked	(Spain) Iván Morante	(Spain) Ibiza	(Spain) Burgos	1–0	2022–23 Segunda División	N/A
Unranked	(Kazakhstan) Askhat Tagybergen	Kazakhstan	Denmark	2–2	UEFA Euro 2024 qualification	N/A
Unranked	(Brazil) Bia Zaneratto	Brazil	Panama	3–0	2023 FIFA Women's World Cup	N/A

=== 2024 ===
FIFA announced the list of 11 nominees on 28 November 2024.

Beginning this year, FIFA also established the FIFA Marta Award as a separate category for female players, named after the Brazil women's forward and captain for over two decades from 2002 until 2024.

Rank	Player	Team	Opponent	Score	Competition	Points
1st	(Argentina) Alejandro Garnacho	(England) Manchester United	(England) Everton	1–0	2023–24 Premier League	26
2nd	(Algeria) Yassine Benzia	Algeria	South Africa	3–3	2024 FIFA Series	22
3rd	(Uganda) Denis Omedi	(Uganda) Kitara	(Uganda) KCCA	3–3	2024 Super 8	16
4th	(Ghana) Mohammed Kudus	(England) West Ham United	(Germany) SC Freiburg	4–0	2023–24 UEFA Europa League	13
5th	(Argentina) Walter Bou	(Argentina) Lanús	(Argentina) Tigre	3–2	2024 AFA Liga Profesional de Fútbol	13
6th	(Italy) Federico Dimarco	(Italy) Inter Milan	(Italy) Frosinone	1–0	2023–24 Serie A	12
7th	(England) Jaden Philogene	(England) Hull City	(England) Rotherham United	1–1	2023–24 EFL Championship	12
8th	(Australia) Terry Antonis	(Australia) Melbourne City	(Australia) Western Sydney Wanderers	1–0	2023–24 A-League	8
9th	(Honduras) Michaell Chirinos	Honduras	Costa Rica	1–0	2024 Copa América qualifying play-offs	7
10th	(Qatar) Hassan Al-Haydos	Qatar	China	1–0	2023 AFC Asian Cup	7
11th	(Nigeria) Paul Onuachu	(Turkey) Trabzonspor	(Turkey) Konyaspor	2–1	2023–24 Süper Lig	4

=== 2025 ===
FIFA announced the list of 11 nominees on 13 November 2025.

Rank	Player	Team	Opponent	Score	Competition	Points
1st	(Argentina) Santiago Montiel	(Argentina) Independiente	(Argentina) Independiente Rivadavia	1–0	2025 AFA Liga Profesional de Fútbol	22
2nd	(England) Declan Rice	(England) Arsenal	(Spain) Real Madrid	2–0	2024–25 UEFA Champions League	17
3rd	(Spain) Lamine Yamal	(Spain) Barcelona	(Spain) Espanyol	1–0	2024–25 La Liga	17
Unranked	(Brazil) Alerrandro	(Brazil) Vitória	(Brazil) Cruzeiro	2–0	2024 Campeonato Brasileiro Série A	N/A
Unranked	(Italy) Alessandro Deiola	(Italy) Cagliari	(Italy) Venezia	3–0	2024–25 Serie A	N/A
Unranked	(Argentina) Pedro de la Vega	(United States) Seattle Sounders FC	(Mexico) Cruz Azul	7–0	2025 Leagues Cup	N/A
Unranked	(Egypt) Amr Nasser	(Egypt) Pharco	(Egypt) Al Ahly	2–0	2024–25 Egyptian League Cup	N/A
Unranked	(Mexico) Carlos Orrantia	(Mexico) Atlas	(Mexico) Querétaro	1–0	Liga MX Clausura 2025	N/A
Unranked	(Brazil) Lucas Ribeiro	(South Africa) Mamelodi Sundowns	(Germany) Borussia Dortmund	1–0	2025 FIFA Club World Cup	N/A
Unranked	(Indonesia) Rizky Ridho	(Indonesia) Persija Jakarta	(Indonesia) Arema	1–0	2024–25 Liga 1	N/A
Unranked	(Portugal) Kévin Rodrigues	(Turkey) Kasımpaşa	(Turkey) Çaykur Rizespor	1–0	2024–25 Süper Lig	N/A

== Statistics ==
=== Awards won by nationality ===
Country	Wins	Years
Brazil	3	2011, 2015, 2023
Argentina	3	2021, 2024, 2025
Portugal	1	2009
Turkey	1	2010
Slovakia	1	2012
Sweden	1	2013
Colombia	1	2014
Malaysia	1	2016
France	1	2017
Egypt	1	2018
Hungary	1	2019
South Korea	1	2020
Poland	1	2022

=== Most nominations received ===
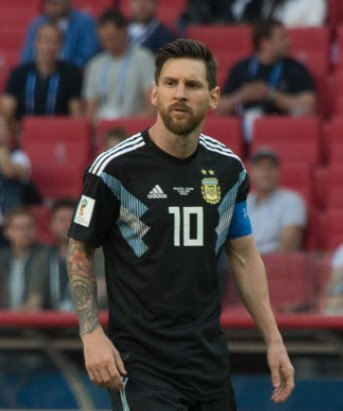
Lionel Messi has been nominated a record seven times, more than any other in the award's history, but has never won the award.

Player	Nominations	Years
(Argentina) Lionel Messi	7	2010, 2011, 2012, 2015, 2016, 2018, 2019
(Brazil) Neymar	5	2010, 2011, 2012, 2013, 2016
(Sweden) Zlatan Ibrahimović	4	2011, 2013, 2014, 2019
(Serbia) Nemanja Matić	2	2013, 2017
(Portugal) Cristiano Ronaldo	2	2009, 2018
(Uruguay) Giorgian de Arrascaeta	2	2018, 2020
(South Africa) Hlompho Kekana	2	2016, 2020
(Scotland) Caroline Weir	2	2020, 2021

== See also ==
- FIFA Ballon d'Or
- FIFA Marta Award
- The Best FIFA Football Awards
