= Billie Simpson =

Northern Ireland footballer

Personal information
- Date of birth: 7 July 1992 (age 34)
- Place of birth: Northern Ireland
- Position: Midfielder

Team information
- Current team: Forfar Farmington

Senior career*
Years	Team	Apps	(Gls)
	Cliftonville	0	(0)
2020-	Forfar Farmington	0	(0)

International career^{‡}
- Northern Ireland
- * Club domestic league appearances and goals as of 13:50, 18 January 2020 (UTC) ‡ National team caps and goals as of 19:45, 30 August 2019 (UTC)

Billie Simpson (born 7 July 1992) is a Northern Irish footballer who plays as a midfielder and has appeared for the Northern Ireland women's national team.

== Career ==
Simpson played for the Cliftonville Ladies. One of her goals was nominated for the 2019 FIFA Puskás Award.

Simpson has been capped for the Northern Ireland national team, appearing for the team during the 2019 FIFA Women's World Cup qualifying cycle.

== Personal life ==
In March 2024, Simpson was charged over a Twelfth of July brawl which saw an elderly man knocked unconscious.
