= 2022 Pinatar Cup squads =

List of players competing at the 2nd edition of the Pinatar Cup

This article lists the squads for the 2022 Pinatar Cup, the second edition of the Pinatar Cup. The cup consisted of a series of friendly games, and will be held in Spain from 16 to 22 February 2022. The eight national teams involved in the tournament registered a squad of 23 players.

The age listed for each player is on 16 February 2022, the first day of the tournament. The numbers of caps and goals listed for each player do not include any matches played after the start of tournament. The club listed is the club for which the player last played a competitive match prior to the tournament. The nationality for each club reflects the national association (not the league) to which the club is affiliated. A flag is included for coaches that are of a different nationality than their own national team.

== Squads ==
=== Belgium ===
Coach: Ives Serneels

The 28-player squad was announced on 8 February 2022.

No.	Pos.	Player	Date of birth (age)	Caps	Goals	Club
1	GK	Nicky Evrard	26 May 1995 (aged 26)	44	0	(Belgium) Gent
2	DF	Davina Philtjens	26 February 1989 (aged 32)	100	10	(Italy) Sassuolo
3	FW	Jassina Blom	3 September 1994 (aged 27)	14	6	(Spain) Tenerife
4	DF	Amber Tysiak	26 January 2000 (aged 22)	10	3	(Belgium) Oud-Heverlee Leuven
5	FW	Sarah Wijnants	13 October 1999 (aged 22)	18	1	(Belgium) Anderlecht
6	FW	Tine De Caigny	9 June 1997 (aged 24)	67	33	(Germany) 1899 Hoffenheim
7	DF	Silke Vanwynsberghe	25 April 1997 (aged 24)	6	0	(Belgium) Gent
8	MF	Lenie Onzia	30 May 1989 (aged 32)	56	4	(Belgium) Oud-Heverlee Leuven
9	MF	Zenia Mertens	27 February 2001 (aged 20)	3	0	(Belgium) Oud-Heverlee Leuven
10	FW	Lisa Petry	12 February 2001 (aged 21)	1	0	(Belgium) Genk
11	FW	Janice Cayman	12 October 1988 (aged 33)	119	46	(France) Lyon
12	GK	Diede Lemey	7 October 1996 (aged 25)	5	0	(Italy) Sassuolo
13	FW	Hannah Eurlings	1 January 2003 (aged 19)	10	3	(Belgium) Oud-Heverlee Leuven
14	FW	Yana Daniëls	8 May 1992 (aged 29)	44	7	(England) Liverpool
15	FW	Jill Janssens	3 October 2003 (aged 18)	2	0	(Belgium) Oud-Heverlee Leuven
16	MF	Marie Minnaert	5 May 1999 (aged 22)	19	2	(Belgium) Club YLA
17	DF	Isabelle Iliano	2 March 1997 (aged 24)	7	0	(Belgium) Club YLA
18	DF	Laura De Neve	9 October 1994 (aged 27)	47	2	(Belgium) Anderlecht
19	DF	Sari Kees	17 February 2001 (aged 20)	0	0	(Belgium) Oud-Heverlee Leuven
19	MF	Charlotte Tison	21 April 1998 (aged 23)	11	0	(Belgium) Anderlecht
20	MF	Julie Biesmans	4 May 1994 (aged 27)	85	3	(Netherlands) PSV
21	GK	Lisa Lichtfus	29 December 1999 (aged 22)	0	0	(France) Dijon
22	DF	Laura Deloose	18 June 1993 (aged 28)	60	4	(Belgium) Anderlecht
23	FW	Jarne Teulings	11 January 2002 (aged 20)	6	2	(Netherlands) Twente
23	DF	Shari Van Belle	22 December 1999 (aged 22)	11	0	(Belgium) Gent
	GK	Femke Bastiaen	11 April 2001 (aged 20)	0	0	(Netherlands) PSV
	MF	Justine Vanhaevermaet	29 April 1992 (aged 29)	31	4	(England) Reading
	FW	Tessa Wullaert	19 March 1993 (aged 28)	104	59	(Belgium) Anderlecht

=== Hungary ===
Coach: Margrét Kratz

The 23-player squad was announced on 2 February 2022. On 14 February 2022, Luca Papp and Sára Pusztai withdrew from the squad and were replaced by Beatrix Fördős and Adrienn Oláh.

No.	Pos.	Player	Date of birth (age)	Caps	Goals	Club
1	GK	Evelin Erős	8 April 1999 (aged 22)			(Hungary) MTK Hungária
2	DF	Beatrix Fördős	7 January 2002 (aged 20)			(Italy) Lazio
3	MF	Henrietta Csiszár	15 May 1994 (aged 27)			(Italy) Inter Milan
4	DF	Diána Németh	31 August 2004 (aged 17)			(Hungary) Ferencváros
5	DF	Anna Csiki	14 November 1999 (aged 22)			(Sweden) Häcken
6	MF	Evelin Fenyvesi	7 November 1996 (aged 25)			(Hungary) Ferencváros
7	MF	Eszter Kovács	15 March 2001 (aged 20)			(Hungary) Puskás Akadémia
8	DF	Viktória Szabó	26 May 1997 (aged 24)			(Hungary) Ferencváros
9	DF	Csilla Savanya	17 April 2004 (aged 17)			(Hungary) Győr
10	FW	Fanny Vágó	23 July 1991 (aged 30)			(Hungary) Ferencváros
11	FW	Adrienn Oláh	19 May 1999 (aged 22)			(Hungary) MTK Hungária
12	GK	Barbara Bíró	11 May 1995 (aged 26)			(Hungary) Haladás-Viktória
13	FW	Emőke Pápai	24 June 2003 (aged 18)			(Switzerland) Grasshopper
14	MF	Loretta Németh	9 December 1995 (aged 26)			(Hungary) Győr
15	FW	Fanni Vachter	14 May 2001 (aged 20)			(Hungary) MTK Hungária
16	MF	Diána Csányi	20 March 1998 (aged 23)			(Hungary) Ferencváros
17	MF	Petra Kocsán	4 June 1998 (aged 23)			(Germany) 1899 Hoffenheim
18	DF	Laura Kovács	15 June 2000 (aged 21)			(Hungary) Győr
19	MF	Dóra Zeller	6 January 1995 (aged 27)			(Germany) Bayer Leverkusen
20	DF	Lilla Turányi	20 December 1998 (aged 23)			(Germany) Bayer Leverkusen
21	FW	Bernadett Zágor	31 January 1990 (aged 32)			(Austria) SKN St. Pölten
22	GK	Fruzsina Schildkraut	30 March 1998 (aged 23)			(Hungary) Diósgyőr
23	DF	Hanna Németh	17 September 1998 (aged 23)			(Hungary) Ferencváros

=== Ireland ===
Coach: (Netherlands) Vera Pauw

The 27-player squad was announced on 11 February 2022. A few days later, Niamh Farrelly withdrew from the squad due to injury and was replaced by Chloe Mustaki.

No.	Pos.	Player	Date of birth (age)	Caps	Goals	Club
1	GK	Courtney Brosnan	10 November 1995 (aged 26)	9	0	(England) Everton
2	DF	Savannah McCarthy	26 March 1997 (aged 24)	8	0	(Republic of Ireland) Galway
4	DF	Louise Quinn	17 June 1990 (aged 31)	0	0	(England) Birmingham City
5	DF	Niamh Fahey	13 October 1987 (aged 34)	99	0	(England) Liverpool
6	MF	Megan Connolly	7 March 1997 (aged 24)	33	3	(England) Brighton & Hove Albion
7	DF	Diane Caldwell	11 September 1988 (aged 33)	84	3	(England) Manchester United
8	MF	Ruesha Littlejohn	3 July 1990 (aged 31)	62	6	(England) Aston Villa
9	FW	Amber Barrett	16 January 1996 (aged 26)	26	4	(Germany) 1. FC Köln
10	MF	Denise O'Sullivan	4 February 1994 (aged 28)	89	16	(United States) North Carolina Courage
11	MF	Katie McCabe	21 September 1995 (aged 26)	57	13	(England) Arsenal
12	FW	Kyra Carusa	14 November 1995 (aged 26)	4	1	(Denmark) HB Køge
13	DF	Áine O'Gorman	13 May 1989 (aged 32)	111	13	(Republic of Ireland) Peamount United
14	FW	Heather Payne	26 January 2000 (aged 22)	22	1	(United States) Florida State Seminoles
15	FW	Lucy Quinn	29 September 1993 (aged 28)	5	1	(England) Birmingham City
16	GK	Grace Moloney	1 March 1993 (aged 28)	5	0	(England) Reading
17	MF	Jamie Finn	21 April 1998 (aged 23)	9	0	(England) Birmingham City
19	MF	Ciara Grant	11 June 1993 (aged 28)	13	0	(Scotland) Rangers
20	DF	Claire Walsh	28 October 1994 (aged 27)	3	0	(Scotland) Glasgow City
21	MF	Isibeal Atkinson	17 July 2001 (aged 20)	3	0	(Scotland) Celtic
22	FW	Leanne Kiernan	27 April 1999 (aged 22)	22	4	(England) Liverpool
23	GK	Megan Walsh	12 November 1994 (aged 27)	0	0	(England) Brighton & Hove Albion
24	MF	Jessica Ziu	6 June 2002 (aged 19)	5	0	(Republic of Ireland) Shelbourne
25	MF	Ellen Molloy	5 June 2004 (aged 17)	4	0	(Republic of Ireland) Wexford Youths
26	GK	Eve Badana	9 July 1993 (aged 28)	3	0	(Republic of Ireland) DLR Waves
27	FW	Abbie Larkin	5 June 2005 (aged 16)	0	0	(Republic of Ireland) Shelbourne
30	DF	Chloe Mustaki	29 July 1995 (aged 26)	0	0	(Republic of Ireland) Shelbourne
	DF	Megan Campbell	28 June 1993 (aged 28)	42	2	(England) Liverpool

=== Poland ===
Coach: Nina Patalon

The 26-player squad was announced on 11 February 2022. Following the announcement, Sylwia Matysik and Paulina Filipczak withdrew due to knee injuries and were replaced by Wiktorię Zieniewicz and Weronikę Wójcik.

No.	Pos.	Player	Date of birth (age)	Caps	Goals	Club
1	GK	Katarzyna Kiedrzynek	19 March 1991 (aged 30)			(Germany) VfL Wolfsburg
2	FW	Martyna Wiankowska	24 December 1996 (aged 25)			(Poland) Czarni Sosnowiec
3	MF	Gabriela Grzywińska	18 February 1996 (aged 25)			(Russia) Zenit Saint Petersburg
4	DF	Paulina Dudek	16 June 1997 (aged 24)			(France) Paris Saint-Germain
5	DF	Małgorzata Grec	11 September 1999 (aged 22)			(Austria) SKN St. Pölten
6	DF	Wiktoria Zieniewicz	9 May 2002 (aged 19)			(Poland) UKS SMS Łódź
7	DF	Małgorzata Mesjasz	12 June 1997 (aged 24)			(Germany) Turbine Potsdam
8	MF	Kinga Kozak	15 October 2002 (aged 19)			(Poland) Czarni Sosnowiec
9	FW	Karolina Gec	9 July 2004 (aged 17)			(Poland) AZS UJ Kraków
10	FW	Weronika Zawistowska	17 December 1999 (aged 22)			(Germany) 1. FC Köln
11	FW	Ewelina Kamczyk	22 February 1996 (aged 25)			(France) Fleury
12	GK	Karolina Klabis	19 July 1991 (aged 30)			(Poland) AZS UJ Kraków
13	MF	Gabriela Grzybowska	21 November 2002 (aged 19)			(Poland) UKS SMS Łódź
14	DF	Anna Zapała	3 March 1996 (aged 25)			(Poland) AZS UJ Kraków
15	DF	Katarzyna Konat	17 January 1996 (aged 26)			(Poland) UKS SMS Łódź
16	MF	Dominika Grabowska	26 December 1998 (aged 23)			(France) Fleury
17	DF	Zofia Buszewska	5 April 2002 (aged 19)			(Poland) Czarni Sosnowiec
18	MF	Nikol Kaletka	6 February 1995 (aged 27)			(Poland) Czarni Sosnowiec
19	FW	Natalia Padilla	6 November 2002 (aged 19)			(Switzerland) Servette
20	FW	Nikola Karczewska	16 October 1999 (aged 22)			(France) Fleury
21	MF	Joanna Wróblewska	27 December 1995 (aged 26)			(Poland) Śląsk Wrocław
22	GK	Kinga Szemik	25 June 1997 (aged 24)			(France) Nantes
23	MF	Adriana Achcińska	22 April 2002 (aged 19)			(Germany) 1. FC Köln
24	FW	Weronika Wójcik	10 February 2001 (aged 21)			(Poland) AZS UJ Kraków
25	MF	Klaudia Lefeld	29 May 1998 (aged 23)			(Poland) Górnik Łęczna
26	GK	Anna Szymańska	5 December 1988 (aged 33)			(Poland) Czarni Sosnowiec

=== Russia ===
Coach: Yuri Krasnozhan

The 23-player squad was announced on 14 February 2022.

No.	Pos.	Player	Date of birth (age)	Caps	Goals	Club
1	GK	Tatyana Shcherbak	22 October 1997 (aged 24)			(Russia) Lokomotiv Moscow
2	DF	Maria Alekseeva	23 October 1998 (aged 23)			(Russia) CSKA Moscow
3	DF	Yulia Bessolova	22 August 1992 (aged 29)			(Russia) Chertanovo Moscow
4	MF	Ekaterina Tyryshkina	31 January 1996 (aged 26)			(France) Dijon
5	DF	Ekaterina Kasina	30 May 1993 (aged 28)			(Russia) Yenisei
6	MF	Anna Peshkova	19 December 2002 (aged 19)			(Russia) Rostov
7	FW	Elizaveta Lazareva	3 September 2002 (aged 19)			(Russia) Zenit Saint Petersburg
8	DF	Alsu Abdullina	17 September 1998 (aged 23)			(England) Chelsea
9	FW	Natalia Machina	28 March 1997 (aged 24)			(Russia) Lokomotiv Moscow
10	FW	Tatiana Morina	9 July 1993 (aged 28)			(Russia) Lokomotiv Moscow
11	DF	Elina Samoilova	26 February 1995 (aged 26)			(Russia) Lokomotiv Moscow
12	MF	Victoria Kozlova	21 December 1995 (aged 26)			(Russia) Lokomotiv Moscow
13	DF	Vera Simanovskaya	13 November 1997 (aged 24)			(Russia) Zenit Saint Petersburg
14	DF	Christina Mashkova	30 June 1992 (aged 29)			(Russia) Lokomotiv Moscow
15	DF	Anna Belomyttseva	24 November 1996 (aged 25)			(Russia) Lokomotiv Moscow
16	MF	Yana Sheina	23 June 2000 (aged 21)			(Russia) Lokomotiv Moscow
17	MF	Marina Fedorova	10 May 1997 (aged 24)			(Russia) Lokomotiv Moscow
18	MF	Ekaterina Pantyukhina	9 April 1993 (aged 28)			(Russia) Zenit Saint Petersburg
19	MF	Tatiana Petrova	23 December 2001 (aged 20)			(Russia) CSKA Moscow
20	FW	Nelli Korovkina	1 November 1989 (aged 32)			(Russia) Lokomotiv Moscow
21	GK	Yulia Grichenko	10 March 1990 (aged 31)			(Russia) Zenit Saint Petersburg
22	DF	Alexandra Lobanova	29 July 2000 (aged 21)			(Sweden) Brommapojkarna
23	MF	Lina Yakupova	5 September 1990 (aged 31)			(Russia) Zenit Saint Petersburg

=== Scotland ===
Coach: (Spain) Pedro Martínez Losa

The 26-player squad was announced on 8 February 2022. The following week, Erin Cuthbert and Chloe Logan withdrew due to injury and were replaced by Leah Eddie and Rachael Johnstone.

No.	Pos.	Player	Date of birth (age)	Caps	Goals	Club
1	GK	Lee Alexander	23 September 1991 (aged 30)			(Scotland) Glasgow City
2	DF	Kirsty Smith	6 January 1994 (aged 28)			(England) Manchester United
3	DF	Nicola Docherty	23 August 1992 (aged 29)			(Scotland) Rangers
4	DF	Rachel Corsie	17 August 1989 (aged 32)			(England) Aston Villa
5	DF	Jen Beattie	13 May 1991 (aged 30)			(England) Arsenal
6	MF	Lisa Robertson	16 May 1992 (aged 29)			(England) Birmingham City
7	MF	Christy Grimshaw	8 November 1995 (aged 26)			(Italy) AC Milan
8	MF	Samantha Kerr	17 April 1999 (aged 22)			(Scotland) Rangers
9	MF	Caroline Weir	20 June 1995 (aged 26)			(England) Manchester City
10	MF	Lucy Graham	10 October 1996 (aged 25)			(England) Everton
11	FW	Abi Harrison	7 December 1997 (aged 24)			(England) Bristol City
12	GK	Jenna Fife	1 December 1995 (aged 26)			(Scotland) Rangers
13	FW	Jane Ross	18 September 1989 (aged 32)			(Scotland) Rangers
14	MF	Chloe Arthur	21 January 1995 (aged 27)			(England) Aston Villa
15	DF	Sophie Howard	17 September 1993 (aged 28)			(England) Leicester City
16	MF	Christie Murray	3 May 1990 (aged 31)			(England) Birmingham City
17	FW	Kirsty Hanson	17 April 1998 (aged 23)			(England) Manchester United
18	FW	Claire Emslie	8 March 1994 (aged 27)			(England) Everton
19	FW	Lana Clelland	26 January 1993 (aged 29)			(Italy) Sassuolo
20	DF	Jenna Clark	29 September 2001 (aged 20)			(Scotland) Glasgow City
21	GK	Eartha Cumings	11 June 1999 (aged 22)			(England) Charlton Athletic
22	DF	Leah Eddie	23 January 2001 (aged 21)	1	0	(Scotland) Hibernian
23	FW	Lizzie Arnot	1 March 1996 (aged 25)			(Scotland) Rangers
24	FW	Martha Thomas	31 May 1996 (aged 25)			(England) Manchester United
25	DF	Kelly Clark	10 June 1994 (aged 27)	0	0	(Scotland) Celtic
26	GK	Rachael Johnstone	2 March 2004 (aged 17)	0	0	(Scotland) Celtic

=== Slovakia ===
Coach: Peter Kopún

The 24-player squad was announced on 8 February 2022. The following week Klaudia Fabová and Tereza Mrocková withdrew from the squad and were replaced by Stela Semanová and Laura Bieliková.

No.	Pos.	Player	Date of birth (age)	Caps	Goals	Club
1	GK	Lucia El-Dahaibiová	22 January 1989 (aged 33)	38	0	(Slovakia) Petržalka
2	DF	Viktória Čeriová	28 March 1998 (aged 23)	2	0	(Slovakia) Slovan Bratislava
3	MF	Stela Semanová	30 April 2001 (aged 20)	2	0	(Slovakia) Slovan Bratislava
4	DF	Andrea Horváthová	5 October 1995 (aged 26)	43	0	(Poland) Czarni Sosnowiec
5	DF	Nikol Mazúchová	7 December 2002 (aged 19)	0	0	(Czech Republic) Lokomotíva Brno
6	MF	Kristína Panáková	4 December 2001 (aged 20)	9	1	(Slovakia) Spartak Myjava
7	DF	Patrícia Fischerová	26 August 1993 (aged 28)	84	3	(Poland) Czarni Sosnowiec
8	FW	Karolína Bayerová	26 August 2004 (aged 17)	0	0	(Czech Republic) Slovácko
9	FW	Laura Žemberyová	20 August 2001 (aged 20)	12	0	(United States) UAB Blazers
10	MF	Lucia Ondrušová	10 May 1988 (aged 33)	105	12	(Czech Republic) Sparta Prague
11	FW	Patrícia Hmírová	30 November 1993 (aged 28)	94	18	(Cyprus) Apollon Ladies
12	GK	Mária Korenčiová	27 April 1989 (aged 32)	102	0	(Spain) Levante
12	GK	Martina Geletová	19 November 2003 (aged 18)	0	0	(Slovakia) Slovan Bratislava
13	DF	Kristína Košíková	20 December 1993 (aged 28)	38	0	(Czech Republic) Slovan Liberec
14	MF	Diana Lemešová	4 October 2000 (aged 21)	7	0	(Austria) Wacker Innsbruck
15	MF	Laura Bieliková	22 January 2000 (aged 22)	1	0	(Czech Republic) Slovácko
16	DF	Diana Bartovičová	20 May 1993 (aged 28)	99	8	(Czech Republic) Slavia Prague
17	MF	Mária Mikolajová	13 June 1999 (aged 22)	56	9	(Austria) SKN St. Pölten
18	MF	Dominika Škorvánková	21 August 1991 (aged 30)	108	15	(France) Montpellier
19	MF	Ľudmila Maťavková	11 April 1998 (aged 23)	18	3	(Belgium) Club YLA
20	DF	Jana Vojteková	12 August 1991 (aged 30)	104	13	(Germany) SC Freiburg
21	FW	Martina Šurnovská	10 February 1999 (aged 23)	47	4	(Czech Republic) Slavia Prague
22	MF	Victoria Kaláberová	7 July 2001 (aged 20)	0	0	(Cyprus) Aris Limassol
23	GK	Dominika Rezeková	1 February 2000 (aged 22)	2	0	(Slovakia) Slovan Bratislava

=== Wales ===
Coach: (England) Gemma Grainger

The 26-player squad was announced on 9 February 2022.

No.	Pos.	Player	Date of birth (age)	Caps	Goals	Club
1	GK	Laura O'Sullivan	23 August 1991 (aged 30)			(Wales) Cardiff City Ladies
2	DF	Lily Woodham	3 September 2000 (aged 21)			(England) Reading
3	DF	Gemma Evans	1 August 1996 (aged 25)			(England) Reading
4	DF	Sophie Ingle	2 September 1991 (aged 30)			(England) Chelsea
5	DF	Rhiannon Roberts	30 August 1990 (aged 31)			(England) Liverpool
6	MF	Josie Green	25 April 1993 (aged 28)			(England) Tottenham Hotspur
7	FW	Helen Ward	26 April 1986 (aged 35)			(England) Watford
8	MF	Angharad James	1 June 1994 (aged 27)			(United States) Orlando Pride
9	FW	Kayleigh Green	22 March 1988 (aged 33)			(England) Brighton & Hove Albion
10	MF	Jess Fishlock	14 January 1987 (aged 35)			(United States) OL Reign
11	FW	Natasha Harding	2 March 1989 (aged 32)			(England) Reading
12	GK	Olivia Clark	30 August 2001 (aged 20)			(England) Coventry United
13	FW	Rachel Rowe	13 September 1992 (aged 29)			(England) Reading
14	DF	Hayley Ladd	6 October 1993 (aged 28)			(England) Manchester United
15	FW	Elise Hughes	15 April 2001 (aged 20)			(England) Charlton Athletic
16	MF	Charlie Estcourt	27 May 1998 (aged 23)			(England) Coventry United
17	DF	Esther Morgan	28 August 2002 (aged 19)			(England) Leicester City
18	MF	Ceri Holland	12 December 1997 (aged 24)			(England) Liverpool
19	MF	Megan Wynne	21 January 1993 (aged 29)			(England) Charlton Athletic
20	MF	Carrie Jones	4 September 2003 (aged 18)			(England) Manchester United
21	GK	Poppy Soper	4 May 2002 (aged 19)			(England) Plymouth Argyle
22	MF	Anna Filbey	11 October 1999 (aged 22)			(England) Charlton Athletic
23	DF	Ffion Morgan	11 May 2000 (aged 21)			(England) Bristol City
24	FW	Georgia Walters	6 April 1993 (aged 28)			(England) Sheffield United
25	MF	Chloe Williams	22 December 2000 (aged 21)			(England) Blackburn Rovers
26	MF	Morgan Rogers	16 July 2002 (aged 19)			(England) Watford

== Player representation ==
=== By club ===
Clubs with four or more players represented are listed.

Players	Club
10	(Russia) Lokomotiv Moscow
7	(Poland) Czarni Sosnowiec
6	(Belgium) Oud-Heverlee Leuven, (England) Liverpool, (England) Manchester United, (England) Reading, (Hungary) Ferencváros, (Russia) Zenit Saint Petersburg, (Scotland) Rangers
5	(Belgium) Anderlecht, (England) Birmingham City
4	(England) Charlton Athletic, (Poland) AZS UJ Kraków, (Slovakia) Slovan Bratislava

=== By club nationality ===
Players	Clubs
53	England
21	Russia
18	Belgium
16	Poland
15	Hungary
13	Scotland
10	Germany
9	France
7	Czech Republic, (Republic of Ireland) Ireland
6	Italy, Slovakia
5	United States
4	Austria
3	Netherlands
2	Cyprus, Spain, Sweden, Switzerland
1	Denmark, Wales

=== By club federation ===
Players	Federation
198	UEFA
5	CONCACAF

=== By representatives of domestic league ===
National squad	Players
Russia	20
Belgium	17
Hungary	15
Poland	14
Scotland	10
Republic of Ireland	7
Slovakia	6
Wales	1
