= 2023 Russian Women's Football Championship =

Russian Women's Football Championship
- Season: 2023
- Dates: 10 March – 25 November
- Champions: Zenit Saint Petersburg (2nd title)
- Matches: 162
- Goals: 456 (2.81 per match)
- Top goalscorer: Ana Dias (18 goals)

The 2023 Russian Women's Football Championship (Чемпионат России по футболу среди женских команд – Cуперлига-2023) was the 32nd season of the Russian women's football top-level league. Zenit Saint Petersburg were the defending champion.

== Teams ==
Location of teams

Team	Location	Stadium	Capacity
Chertanovo	Moscow	Arena Chertanovo	490
CSKA	Khimki	Novye Khimki Stadium	3,066
Dynamo	Khimki	VTB UTB Novogorsk-Dynamo	790
Krasnodar	Krasnodar	Krasnodar Academy Stadium	7,458
Krylia Sovetov	Samara	Metallurg Stadium	33,000
Lokomotiv	Moscow	Sapsan Arena	10,000
Rostov	Rostov-on-Don	Olimp-2	15,840
Rubin	Kazan	Trudovye Rezervy Stadium	5,000
Ryazan-VDV	Orekhovo-Zuyevo	Znamya Truda Stadium	2,500
Yenisey	Krasnoyarsk	Football-Arena Yenisey	3,000
Zenit	Saint Petersburg	Smena Stadium Field 1	1,200
Zenit	Saint Petersburg	Smena Stadium Field 5	500
Zvezda-2005	Perm	Zvezda Stadium	17,000

== Results ==
=== Regular season ===
Pos	Team	Pld	W	D	L	GF	GA	GD	Pts	Qualification	CSK	ZEN	LOK	DYN	ZVE	RYA	ROS	KRA	CHE	YEN	RUB	KRY
1	CSKA Moscow	22	21	0	1	72	11	+61	63	Play-off I		0–2	2–1	2–1	3–1	2–1	7–0	1–0	2–1	4–0	5–0	6–0
2	Zenit Saint Petersburg	22	18	3	1	53	8	+45	57	Play-off I	1–2		1–0	2–0	2–0	2–0	1–1	2–1	0–0	1–0	3–0	5–0
3	Lokomotiv Moscow	22	16	2	4	52	11	+41	50	Play-off I	0–2	0–2		2–0	3–0	3–0	1–0	1–1	5–2	2–0	3–0	3–0
4	Dynamo Moscow	22	13	2	7	34	26	+8	41	Play-off I	0–3	0–5	1–4		1–0	5–0	0–0	2–0	0–2	1–0	4–1	3–0
5	Zvezda-2005 Perm	22	11	5	6	29	19	+10	38	Play-off I	0–1	1–1	0–3	2–2		2–1	4–1	1–0	2–1	3–0	2–0	4–0
6	Ryazan-VDV	22	9	2	11	19	31	−12	29	Play-off I	0–4	0–1	0–1	0–2	0–1		2–0	1–0	1–1	2–1	1–0	2–1
7	Rostov	22	6	5	11	27	40	−13	23	Play-off II	2–3	2–3	0–5	0–2	0–0	1–1		1–4	0–0	3–0	1–0	4–0
8	Krasnodar	22	5	6	11	23	26	−3	21	Play-off II	1–2	1–3	0–1	0–2	0–0	2–1	1–2		2–1	4–0	1–1	1–1
9	Chertanovo Moscow	22	5	6	11	16	30	−14	21	Play-off II	0–5	0–3	0–1	2–3	0–0	0–1	1–2	1–0		1–0	2–1	1–0
10	Yenisey Krasnoyarsk	22	5	2	15	14	35	−21	17	Play-off II	0–1	0–2	0–0	0–1	0–2	0–1	3–1	0–2	2–0		2–1	2–1
11	Rubin Kazan	22	2	4	16	13	50	−37	10	Play-off II	0–8	0–3	0–6	1–2	0–1	1–2	2–0	2–2	0–0	1–1		0–1
12	Krylia Sovetov Samara	22	1	3	18	6	71	−65	6	Play-off II	0–7	0–8	0–7	0–2	0–3	1–2	0–6	0–0	0–0	1–3	0–2	

Source: RFU
Rules for classification: 1) Points; 2) Head-to-head points; 3) Head-to-head wins; 4) Head-to-head goal difference; 5) Head-to-head goals; 6) Number of wins; 7) Goal difference; 8) Goals scored; 9) Fair play points; 10) Drawing of lots

=== Play-off I ===
The points obtained during the regular season were halved (and rounded up) before the start of the playoff.

Pos	Team	Pld	W	D	L	GF	GA	GD	Pts	ZEN	CSK	LOK	ZVE	DYN	RYA
1	Zenit Saint Petersburg	27	22	4	1	65	10	+55	41			3–1	0–0	3–0	
2	CSKA Moscow	27	23	1	3	85	16	+69	38	1–2		1–2		3–1	
3	Lokomotiv Moscow	27	20	2	5	66	16	+50	37				5–0	2–0	4–1
4	Zvezda-2005 Perm	27	13	7	7	35	26	+9	27		0–0				3–1
5	Dynamo Moscow	27	14	2	11	43	38	+5	23				1–3		7–1
6	Ryazan-VDV	27	9	2	16	22	57	−35	14	0–4	0–8				

Source: RFU
Rules for classification: 1) Points; 2) Head-to-head points; 3) Head-to-head wins; 4) Head-to-head goal difference; 5) Head-to-head goals; 6) Number of wins; 7) Goal difference; 8) Goals scored; 9) Fair play points; 10) Drawing of lots

=== Play-off II ===
The points obtained during the regular season were halved (and rounded up) before the start of the playoff.

Pos	Team	Pld	W	D	L	GF	GA	GD	Pts	ROS	CHE	KRA	YEN	RUB	KRY
7	Rostov	27	9	6	12	33	44	−11	21		1–2	1–0	0–0		
8	Chertanovo Moscow	27	8	7	12	29	33	−4	20				0–0	1–2	8–0
9	Krasnodar	27	8	6	13	34	30	+4	19		0–2		4–0	3–1	
10	Yenisey Krasnoyarsk	27	7	4	16	20	39	−19	16					3–0	3–0
11	Rubin Kazan	27	3	5	19	17	59	−42	9	1–2					0–0
12	Krylia Sovetov Samara	27	1	4	22	7	88	−81	4	1–2		0–4			

Source: RFU
Rules for classification: 1) Points; 2) Head-to-head points; 3) Head-to-head wins; 4) Head-to-head goal difference; 5) Head-to-head goals; 6) Number of wins; 7) Goal difference; 8) Goals scored; 9) Fair play points; 10) Drawing of lots

== Top scorers ==
Rank	Player	Team	Total
1	(Portugal) Ana Dias	Zenit Saint Petersburg	18
2	(Cameroon) Gabrielle Onguéné	CSKA Moscow	15
2	(Russia) Yana Sheina	Lokomotiv Moscow	15
4	(Russia) Daniela Basaeva	Krasnodar	12
5	(Serbia) Nevena Damjanović	CSKA Moscow	11
5	(Brazil) Layssa dos Santos	Lokomotiv Moscow	11
5	(Russia) Nadezhda Smirnova	CSKA Moscow	11
5	(United States) Kaylan Williams	Dynamo Moscow	11
9	(Poland) Gabriela Grzywińska	Zenit Saint Petersburg	9
9	(Nigeria) Chinonyerem Macleans	Lokomotiv Moscow	9
9	(Nigeria) Francisca Ordega	CSKA Moscow	9
9	(Russia) Medeya Zharkova	Krasnodar	9
