= Natalia Mashina =

Russian association football player

Personal information
- Full name: Natalia Viktorovna Mashina
- Date of birth: 28 March 1997 (age 29)
- Place of birth: Moscow, Russia
- Height: 1.78 m (5 ft 10 in)
- Position: Forward

Team information
- Current team: Fatih Karagümrük
- Number: 9

Senior career*
Years	Team	Apps	(Gls)
2014	Izmailovo	3	(0)
2014–2015	Rossiyanka	12	(0)
2016–2020	CSKA Moscow	55	(7)
2020–2021	Zenit Saint Petersburg	22	(5)
2022	Lokomotiv Moscow	18	(9)
2023–	Fatih Karagümrük	3	(5)

International career
2013–2014	Russia U-17	7	(0)
2016	Russia U-19	6	(4)
2017–	Russia9	16	(3)
- * Club domestic league appearances and goals as of 5 February 2023

Natalia Viktorovna Mashina (Russian: Наталья Викторовна Машина born 28 March 1997) is a Russian footballer. She plays as forward for Fatih Karagümrük in the Turkish Women's Football Super League, as well as the Russia women's national football team.

== Personal life ==
Natalia Mashina was born in Moscow, Russia on 28 March 1997. She studied at the Russian State Social University in Moscow.

== Club career ==
Mashina began to play football in the Youth Sports School of "Savyolovsky No. 75". She played in her country for CSP Izmailovo (2014), WFC Rossiyanka (2014–2015), ZFK CSKA Moscow (2016–2020), ZFK Zenit Saint Petersburg (2020–2021) and WFC Lokomotiv Moscow (2022).

She is 1.78 m (5 ft 10 in) tall at 60 kg (130 lb), and plays in the forward position.

Mid January 2023, she moved to Turkey, and signed with the Istanbul-based Super League club Fatih Karagümrük .

== International career ==
Mashina played for the Russia U-17 team between 2014. She was a member of the Russia U-19 team in 2016. She was then admitted to the Russia women's team in the years 2017 and 2021–2022. She enjoyed the national team's bronze medal won at the 2017 Summer Universiade in Taipei, Taiwan. The same year, she played at the Algarve Cup. She was a member of the national team, which became runners-up at the 2022 Pinatar Cup.

== International goals ==
No.	Date	Venue	Opponent	Score	Result	Competition
1.	1 March 2017	Lagos Municipal Stadium, Lagos, Portugal	Portugal	1–0	1–0	2018 Algarve Cup
2.	22 September 2020	Slokas Stadium, Jūrmala, Latvia	Estonia	2–0	3–0	UEFA Women's Euro 2022 qualifying
3.	27 October 2020	Sapsan Arena, Moscow, Russia	Turkey	4–0	4–2	UEFA Women's Euro 2022 qualifying
4.	14 July 2023	Central Stadium, Kazan, Russia	Iran	4–0	4–0	Friendly
5.	26 October 2024	Emirhan Sports Complex, Antalya, Turkey	Haiti	1–0	2–1	2024 Pink Ladies Cup
6.	26 February 2025	Al Hamriya Sports Club Stadium, Al Hamriyah, UAE	Jordan	1–0	3–0	2025 Pink Ladies Cup
7.	3 June 2026	Wuhan Five Rings Sports Center, Wuhan, China	China	1–0	2–1	Friendly
8.	11 October 2026	Kishore Bharati Krirangan, Kolkata, India	India	6–0	8–0	Friendly
9.	11 October 2026	Kishore Bharati Krirangan, Kolkata, India	India	7–0	8–0	Friendly
