= Pink Ladies Cup =

International women's football tournament

- Organiser(s): McSport
- Founded: 2024
- Teams: 6
- Broadcaster: Fanzone.tv

The Pink Ladies Cup is an annual international women's football tournament. Established in 2024, it gathers national teams from various confederations to compete in a round-robin format. Each team play two or three of the participating teams.

== Tournament format ==
The Pink Ladies Cup follows a round-robin format, where each team plays against all others. Points are awarded as follows:

- Win – 3 points
- Draw – 1 point
- Loss – 0 points

If two or more teams have the same number of points, goal difference and goals scored serve as tiebreakers. The team with the most points at the end is declared the champion.

== Venues ==
Edition	Venue	Capacity	Location	Host cities of the Pink Ladies Cup
2024	Emir Hotels Sports Complex	2,000	Antalya, Turkey	Host cities of the Pink Ladies Cup
2025	Al Hamriya Sports Club Stadium	5,000	Al Hamriyah, United Arab Emirates	Host cities of the Pink Ladies Cup
2026	Al Hamriya Sports Club Stadium	5,000	Al Hamriyah, United Arab Emirates	Host cities of the Pink Ladies Cup

== Results ==
=== 2024 Pink Ladies Cup ===
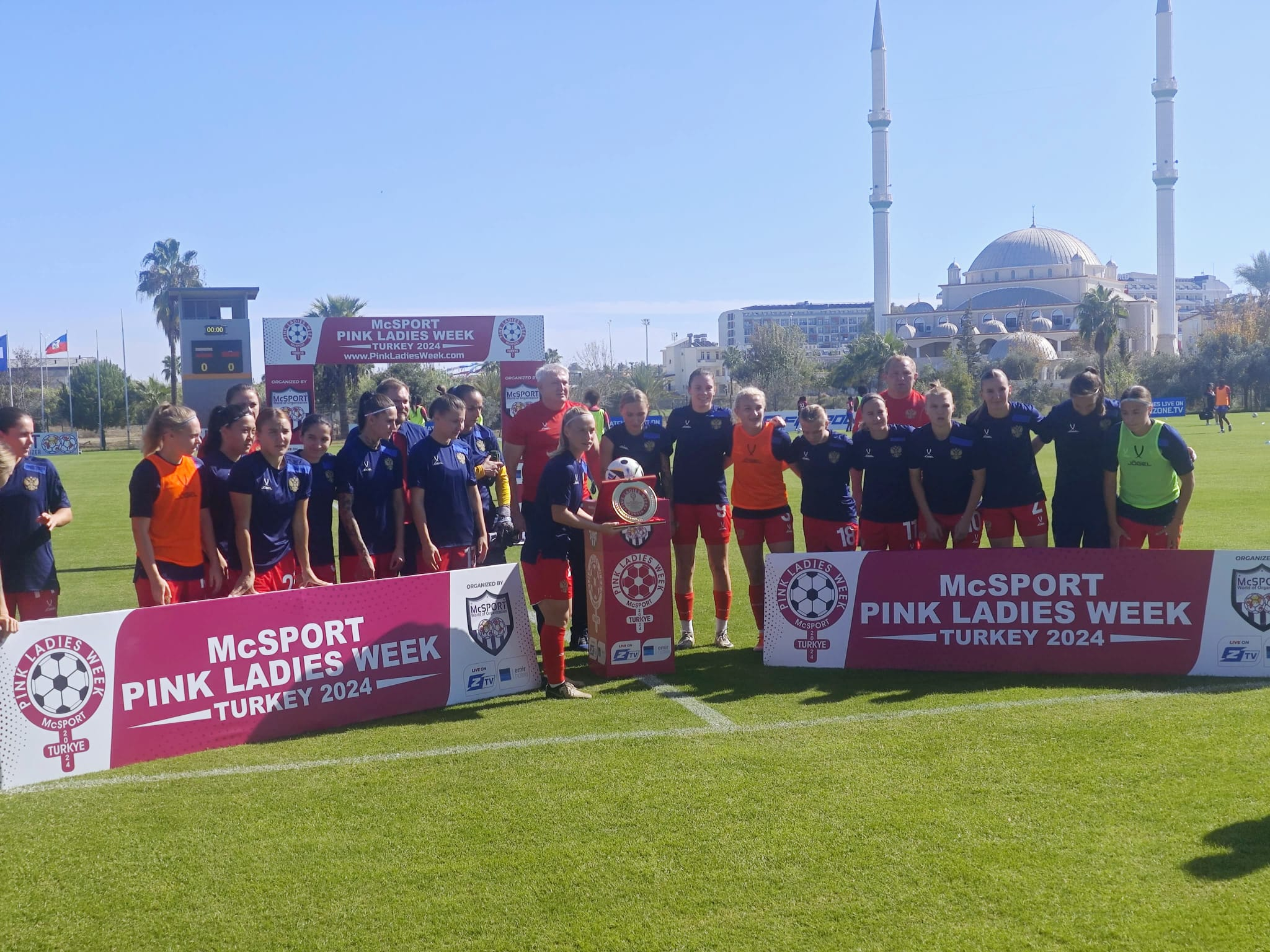
Russia at the 2024 Pink Ladies Cup

Pos	Team	Pld	W	D	L	GF	GA	GD	Pts
1	Russia (C)	2	2	0	0	6	1	+5	6
2	Haiti	3	2	0	1	8	6	+2	6
3	Chinese Taipei	3	2	0	1	6	4	+2	6
4	Philippines	2	1	0	1	4	4	0	3
5	Kenya	3	1	0	2	4	6	−2	3
6	Jordan	3	0	0	3	3	10	−7	0

Source: PLC
(C) Champions

==== Matches ====
23 October 2024
16:00

Chinese Taipei	1–0	Kenya
Li Yi-wen 19'	Report

Emir Hotels Sports Complex 2, Antalya
23 October 2024
19:00

Haiti	4–2	Jordan
Ibrahim 20'; A. Pierre-Louis 44'; B. Louis 47'; D. Pierre-Louis 55'	Report	Akroush 31'; Al Fararjeh 83'

Emir Hotels Sports Complex 1, Antalya

26 October 2024
11:00

Haiti	3–2	Chinese Taipei
Dumornay 83'; Mondésir 86'; B. Louis 90+2'	Report	Li Yi-wen 13'; Huang Ke-sin 54'

Emir Hotels Sports Complex 2, Antalya
26 October 2024
16:00

Philippines	3–0	Jordan
Bolden 2', 68' (pen.); Guillou 77' (pen.)	Report

Emir Hotels Sports Complex 1, Antalya
26 October 2024
19:00

Russia	4–0	Kenya
Shesterneva 6'; Kuropatkina 10'; Bizenkova 57'; Komissarova 80'	Report

Emir Hotels Sports Complex 1, Antalya

29 October 2024
10:00

Chinese Taipei	3–1	Jordan
Wu Kai-ching 36'; Su Yu-hsuan 60'; Li Yi-wen 68'	Report	Al-Bitar 39'

Emir Hotels Sports Complex 2, Antalya
29 October 2024
13:00

Russia	2–1	Haiti
Mashina 33'; Petrova 51'	Report	Dumornay 46'

Emir Hotels Sports Complex 1, Antalya

30 October 2024
16:00

Philippines	1–4	Kenya
Bolden 67' (pen.)	Report	Mutukiza 8'; Long 37' (o.g.); Alukwe 68'; Adhiambo 82'

Emir Hotels Sports Complex 1, Antalya

=== 2025 Pink Ladies Cup ===
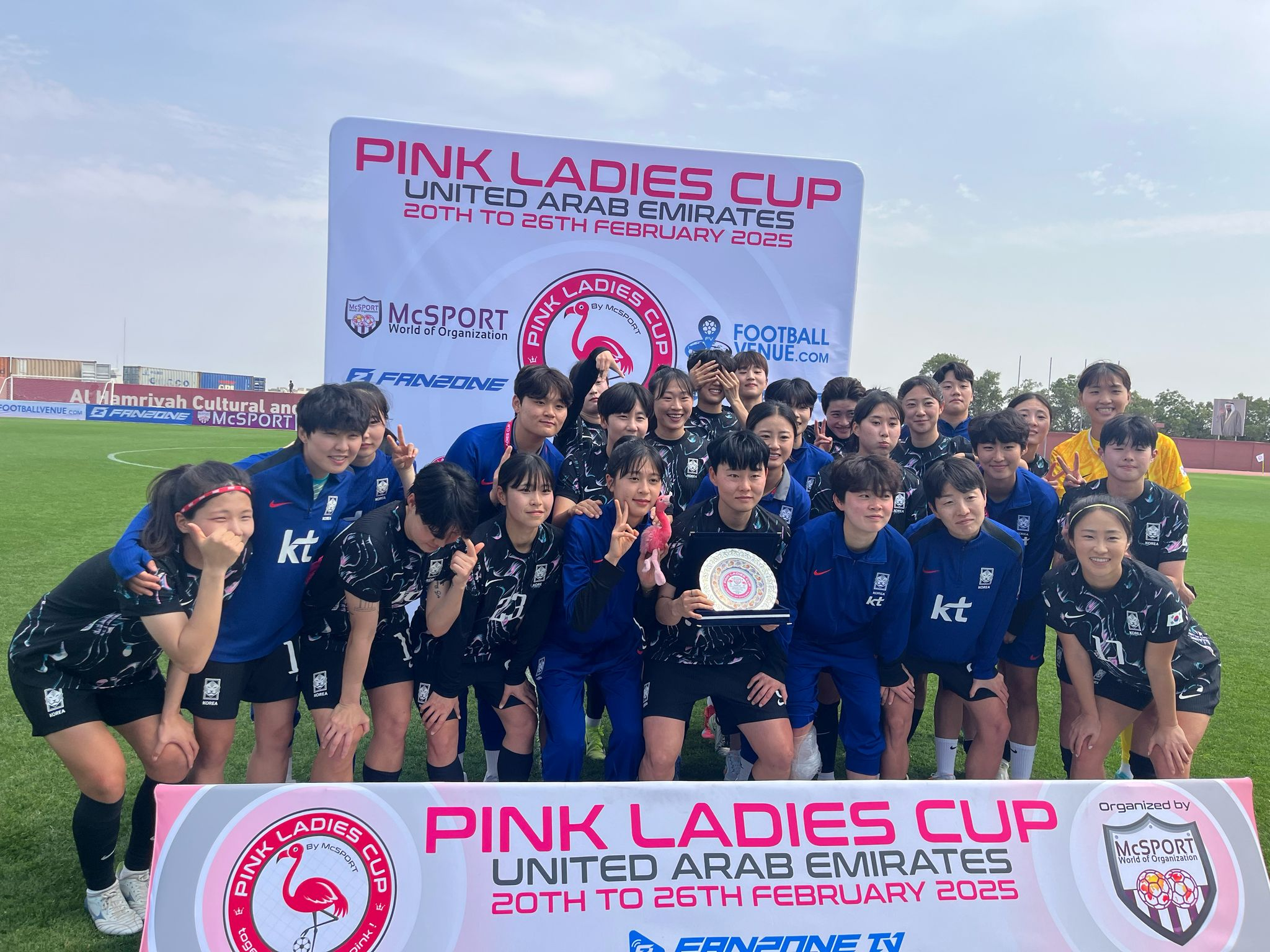
South Korea were awarded the 2025 championship trophy after placing first with points and having a superior goal difference.

Pos	Team	Pld	W	D	L	GF	GA	GD	Pts
1	South Korea (C)	3	3	0	0	10	0	+10	9
2	Russia	3	3	0	0	8	1	+7	9
3	Uzbekistan	3	1	1	1	1	3	−2	4
4	India	3	1	0	2	2	5	−3	3
5	Thailand	3	0	1	2	1	7	−6	1
6	Jordan	3	0	0	3	0	6	−6	0

Source: fanzone.tv
Rules for classification: 1) points; 2) goal difference
(C) Champions

==== Matches ====
20 February 2025
11:00

South Korea	3–0	Uzbekistan
Choo Hyo-joo 38', 44'; Choe Yu-ri 89'	Report

Al Hamriya Sports Club Stadium, Al Hamriyah
20 February 2025
15:00

Jordan	0–2	India
	Report	Priyangka Devi 23'; Kalyan 54'

Al Hamriya Sports Club Stadium, Al Hamriyah
20 February 2025
19:00

Russia	3–1	Thailand
Morozova 15'; Ishmukhametova 48'; Smirnova 67'	Report	Jiraporn M. 35'

Al Hamriya Sports Club Stadium, Al Hamriyah
Referee: Mohamed Al-Harmoodi (United Arab Emirates)

23 February 2025
11:00

Jordan	0–1	Uzbekistan
		Mamatkulova 86'

Al Hamriya Sports Club Stadium, Al Hamriyah
23 February 2025
15:00

Thailand	0–4	South Korea
	Report	Jeong Da-bin 24'; Choe Yu-ri 33'; Ji So-yun 45+2'; Moon Eun-ju 77'

Al Hamriya Sports Club Stadium, Al Hamriyah
23 February 2025
19:00

Russia	2–0	India
Zhukova 25'; Smirnova 90+2'	Report

Al Hamriya Sports Club Stadium, Al Hamriyah
Referee: Khudum Bhit Khulud (United Arab Emirates)

26 February 2025
11:00

India	0–3	South Korea
	Report	Choi Yoo-jung 8'; Choi Da-kyeong 28'; Moon Eun-ju 81'

Al Hamriya Sports Club Stadium, Al Hamriyah
26 February 2025
15:00

Uzbekistan	0–0	Thailand

Al Hamriya Sports Club Stadium, Al Hamriyah
26 February 2025
19:00

Russia	3–0	Jordan
Mashina 3'; Ishmukhametova 15'; Morozova 57'	Report

Al Hamriya Sports Club Stadium, Al Hamriyah
Referee: Omar Hassan (United Arab Emirates)

=== 2026 Pink Ladies Cup ===
Pos	Team	Pld	W	D	L	GF	GA	GD	Pts
1	Ghana	2	2	0	0	8	0	+8	6
2	Russia	2	1	0	1	4	5	−1	3
3	Tanzania	1	0	0	1	1	4	−3	0
4	Hong Kong	1	0	0	1	0	4	−4	0

Source: PLC
Rules for classification: 1) points; 2) goal difference

==== Matches ====
28 February 2026
16:00

Ghana	4–0	Hong Kong
Princess 28'; Boaduwaa 40'; Boye-Hlorkah 47'; Zakaria 87'	Report

Al Hamriya Sports Club Stadium, Al Hamriyah
Attendance: 1,000
Referee: Rawdha Almansoori (United Arab Emirates)
28 February 2026
21:00

Russia	4–1	Tanzania
Yukyaeva 1'; Smirnova 43' (pen.), 65'; Lushnikova 82'	Report	Gerald 85'

Al Hamriya Sports Club Stadium, Al Hamriyah
Attendance: 2,500
Referee: Yahya Al Mulla (United Arab Emirates)

3 March 2026
16:00

Ghana	4–0	Russia
Nyamekye 8'; Boaduwaa 18', 33'; Zakaria 88'	Report

Al Hamriya Sports Club Stadium, Al Hamriyah
3 March 2026
21:00

Hong Kong	Cancelled	Tanzania

Al Hamriya Sports Club Stadium, Al Hamriyah

6 March 2026
16:00

Hong Kong	Cancelled	Russia

Al Hamriya Sports Club Stadium, Al Hamriyah
6 March 2026
21:00

Ghana	Cancelled	Tanzania

Al Hamriya Sports Club Stadium, Al Hamriyah

== Participating teams ==
National team	2024	2025	2026
Russia	Yes	Yes	Yes
South Korea		Yes	
Philippines	Yes		
Chinese Taipei	Yes		
Haiti	Yes		
Jordan	Yes	Yes	
Kenya	Yes		
Uzbekistan		Yes	
India		Yes	
Thailand		Yes	
Ghana			Yes
Tanzania			Yes
Hong Kong			Yes

== Pink Ladies U20 Youth Cup ==
India women's national under-20 football team 2nd out of 4 teams.
