= Ajegipina Zakaria =

Ghanaian footballer (born 2005)

Personal information
- Full name: Patience Ajegipina Zakaria
- Date of birth: 24 August 2005 (age 21)
- Position: Forward

Team information
- Current team: Al-Taraji
- Number: 30

Senior career*
Years	Team	Apps	(Gls)
2025–2026	Ampem Darkoa Ladies	17	(14)
2026–	Al-Taraji	7	(4)

International career
2026–	Ghana		(3)
- * Club domestic league appearances and goals as of 31 October 2026

Ajegipina Zakaria (born 24 August 2005) is a Ghanaian professional footballer who plays as a forward for Saudi Women's Premier League club Al Taraji and the Ghana national team.

== Early life ==
Zakaria began playing football at a young age, initially joining boys in her community due to the limited acceptance of girls' football. She credited playing alongside boys with toughening her up and shaping her development as a player.

== Club career ==
Zakaria established herself as a key forward for Ampem Darkoa Ladies during the 2024–25 and 2025–26 seasons, finishing as the league's top scorer in the latter campaign and helping the club win its fifth Women's Premier League title.

In September 2026, Al Taraji announced Zakaria's signing ahead of the 2026–27 Saudi Women's Premier League season. On 11 September 2026, she made her debut for the club as a substitute against Al-Ahli, scoring Al Taraji's only goal in a 5–1 defeat. By the sixth round, Zakaria had scored four of Al Taraji's five league goals.

== International career ==
In February 2026, Zakaria received her first call-up to the senior national team for the 2026 Pink Ladies Cup. She made her international debut on 26 February against Hong Kong, scoring her first senior international goal in that match.

=== International goals ===
No.	Date	Venue	Opponent	Score	Result	Competition
1.	28 February 2026	Al Hamriya Sports Club Stadium, Sharjah, UAE	Hong Kong	4–0	4–0	2026 Pink Ladies Cup
2.	3 March 2026	Al Hamriya Sports Club Stadium, Sharjah, UAE	Russia	4–0	4–0	2026 Pink Ladies Cup
3.	13 October 2026	Accra Sports Stadium, Accra, Ghana	Mauritius	3–0	7–0	2028 CAF Women's Olympic qualifying tournament
