= Nadezhda Koltakova =

Russian footballer (born 1992)

Personal information
- Full name: Nadezhda Koltakova
- Date of birth: 4 June 1992 (age 34)
- Place of birth: Kurbatovo, Voronezh Oblast, Russia
- Height: 1.71 m (5 ft 7 in)
- Position: Defender

Team information
- Current team: Dynamo Moscow
- Number: 22

Senior career*
Years	Team	Apps	(Gls)
2009–2010	FK Zvezda Zvenigorod	26	(4)
2011–2014	FK Rossiyanka	35	(0)
2015	Zorky	6	(0)
2017	Donchanka Azov	14	(0)
2018–2020	Ryazan-VDV	47	(6)
2021–2024	Rostov	83	(11)
2025–	Dynamo Moscow	4	(0)

International career^{‡}
2011	Russia U19	7	(1)
2018–	Russia	5	(0)
- * Club domestic league appearances and goals as of 20 May 2025 ‡ National team caps and goals as of 12:30, 4 June 2019

Nadezhda Koltakova is a Russian football defender, currently playing for Dynamo Moscow in the Russian Championship.

She started her career in Zvezda Zvenigorod. When Zvezda was disbanded after the 2010 season she signed for national champion WFC Rossiyanka, with which she won her first championship in 2012 and she made her UEFA Champions League debut in the 2012-13 season.

A former under-19 international, she scored Russia's first goal in the 2011 U-19 European Championship against Italy.
