= Doris Boaduwaa =

Ghanaian footballer

- Boaduwaa with Ghana in 2024

Personal information
- Date of birth: 24 December 2002 (age 23)
- Place of birth: Atebubu, Ghana
- Position: Forward

Team information
- Current team: Hapoel Jerusalem

Youth career
- Atebubu Royals

Senior career*
Years	Team	Apps	(Gls)
2016–2018	Nana Afia Kobi Ampem SC		
2018–2023	Hasaacas		
2023–2025	ŽFK Spartak Subotica		
2025–	Hapoel Jerusalem		

International career
2021–2022	Ghana U20	9	(3)
2023–	Ghana		
Medal record
Representing Ghana
Women's Africa Cup of Nations
Third place	2024 Morocco
- * Club domestic league appearances and goals

Doris Boaduwaa is a Ghanaian professional footballer who plays for Israeli Women's Premier League club Hapoel Jerusalem and the Ghana women's national team. In 2022, she was nominated for Interclub Player of the Year (Women), Player of the Year (Women) and Young Player of the Year (Women) at the 2022 CAF Awards.

== Club career ==
Boaduwaa first played for a local team at the age of seven, joining boys team Atebubu Royals alongside her Ghana teammate Grace Asantewaa, as there were no female teams in the city at the time.

Boaduwaa's senior career began with Nana Afia Kobi Ampem SC in 2016. She later joined Hasaacas Ladies in 2018, where she later went on to win the Ghana Women's Premier League title.

On 7 August 2023, Boaduwaa joined ŽFK Spartak Subotica. She moved to Hapoel Jerusalem in 2024 and went on to help the club win their first ever league title in her second season.

== International career ==
=== Youth level ===
Boaduwaa played in all six of Ghana's qualification matches for the 2022 FIFA U-20 Women's World Cup, scoring two goals and getting an assist in the process. Boaduwaa scored Ghana's only goal in the final tournament in a 4–1 defeat against the Netherlands.

=== Senior level ===
No.	Date	Venue	Opponent	Score	Result	Competition
1.	20 September 2023	Kigali Pelé Stadium, Kigali, Rwanda	Rwanda	1–0	7–0	2024 Women's Africa Cup of Nations qualification
2.	27 October 2023	Stade de l'Amitié, Cotonou, Benin	Benin	1–0	3–0	2024 CAF Women's Olympic qualifying tournament
3.	1 December 2023	Accra Sports Stadium, Accra, Ghana	Namibia	1–0	3–1	2024 Women's Africa Cup of Nations qualification
4.	1 December 2023	Accra Sports Stadium, Accra, Ghana	Namibia	3–0	3–1	2024 Women's Africa Cup of Nations qualification
5.	28 February 2024	Levy Mwanawasa Stadium, Ndola, Zambia	Zambia	2–1	3–3	2024 CAF Women's Olympic qualifying tournament
6.	21 June 2024	Ziaida Sports Complex, Benslimane, Morocco	Malawi	1–1	3–1	Friendly
7.	21 June 2024	Ziaida Sports Complex, Benslimane, Morocco	Malawi	2–1	3–1	Friendly
8.	21 June 2024	Ziaida Sports Complex, Benslimane, Morocco	Malawi	3–1	3–1	Friendly
9.	14 July 2025	Berkane Municipal Stadium, Berkane, Morocco	Tanzania	1–0	4–1	2024 Women's Africa Cup of Nations
10.	23 October 2025	Suez Canal Stadium, Ismailia, Egypt	Egypt	1–0	3–0	2026 Women's Africa Cup of Nations qualification
11.	28 October 2025	Accra Sports Stadium, Accra, Ghana	Egypt	1–0	4–0	2026 Women's Africa Cup of Nations qualification
12.	28 October 2025	Accra Sports Stadium, Accra, Ghana	Egypt	2–0	4–0	2026 Women's Africa Cup of Nations qualification
13.	28 October 2025	Accra Sports Stadium, Accra, Ghana	Egypt	4–0	4–0	2026 Women's Africa Cup of Nations qualification
14.	28 February 2026	Al Hamriya Sports Club Stadium, Al Hamriyah, United Arab Emirates	Hong Kong	2–0	4–0	2026 Pink Ladies Cup
15.	3 March 2026	Al Hamriya Sports Club Stadium, Al Hamriyah, United Arab Emirates	Russia	2–0	4–0	2026 Pink Ladies Cup
16.	3 March 2026	Al Hamriya Sports Club Stadium, Al Hamriyah, United Arab Emirates	Russia	3–0	4–0	2026 Pink Ladies Cup
17.	24 July 2026	Casablanca, Morocco	Malawi	1–0	4–0	Friendly
18.	24 July 2026	Casablanca, Morocco	Malawi	2–0	4–0	Friendly
19.	24 July 2026	Casablanca, Morocco	Malawi	3–0	4–0	Friendly
20.	29 July 2026	Moulay Rachid Stadium, Casablanca, Morocco	Cape Verde	1–0	2–0	2026 Women's Africa Cup of Nations

== Honours ==
Hasaacas Ladies

- Ghana Women's Premier League (GWPL): 2020–21
- Ghana Women's Special Competition: 2019
- Ghana Women's FA Cup: 2021
- WAFU Zone B Tournament: 2021
- CAF Women's Champions League runner-up: 2021
- Ghana Football Awards Female Footballer Of The Year: 2024–25
- 2026 Pink Ladies Cup: Top Scorer

Hapoel Jerusalem

- Israeli Women's Premier League: 2025–26
