= Kaylan =

Kaylan may refer to:

- Former name of Disco Montego
- Howard Kaylan, American retired musician and songwriter
- Kaylan Bigun, American tennis player
- Kaylan Marckese, American soccer player
- Kaylan Williams, American soccer player
