= Hong Kong women's national football team =

Women's national association football team representing Hong Kong

Hong Kong
- Association: Football Association of Hong Kong, China (HKFA)
- Confederation: AFC (Asia)
- Sub-confederation: EAFF (East Asia)
- Head coach: José Ricardo Rambo
- Most caps: Chan Wing Sze (95)
- Top scorer: Cheung Wai Ki (22)
- FIFA code: HKG
First colours	Second colours

FIFA ranking
- Current: 80 ▲1 (20 October 2026)
- Highest: 58 (June – September 2009)
- Lowest: 83 (August 2025)

First international
- Hong Kong 0–2 New Zealand (Hong Kong; 25 August 1975)

Biggest win
- Northern Mariana Islands 0–11 Hong Kong (Yona, Guam; 19 July 2012)

Biggest defeat
- North Korea 19–0 Hong Kong (Pyongyang, North Korea; 12 August 2007)

Asian Cup
- Appearances: 14 (first in 1975)
- Best result: Third place (1980)

The Hong Kong women's national football team (Chinese: 中國香港女子足球代表隊; recognized as Hong Kong, China by FIFA) represents Hong Kong in international women's football and is controlled by the Football Association of Hong Kong, China, the governing body for football in Hong Kong.

== History ==
The history of women's football in Hong Kong can traced in 1965 when Veronica Chan founded the Hong Kong Ladies Football Association.

Hong Kong's domestic-based players has long been amateurs with part-time jobs. Chan was credited for Hong Kong's role in hosting the AFC Women's Asian Cup in 1975, 1981, 1986, and 1989.

== Results and fixtures ==
The following is a list of match results in the last 12 months, as well as any future matches that have been scheduled.

Legend

Win Draw Loss Void or postponed Fixture

=== 2025 ===
29 November Friendly	Liechtenstein	1–4	Hong Kong	Eschen, Liechtenstein
14:00	Hürlimann 90+3'	Report	Leung H.K. 45', 54', 83' (pen.); Wong T.K. 90+1'	Stadium: Sportpark Eschen-Mauren; Attendance: 170; Referee: Déborah Anex (Switzerland)

=== 2026 ===
26 February 2026 Pink Ladies Cup	Ghana	4–0	Hong Kong	Al Hamriyah, UAE
16:00 UTC+4	Princess 28'; Boaduwaa 40'; Boye-Hlorkah 47'; Zakaria 87'	Report		Stadium: Al Hamriya Sports Club Stadium; Attendance: 1,000; Referee: Rawdha Almansoori (United Arab Emirates)

3 March 2026 Pink Ladies Cup	Hong Kong	Cancelled	Tanzania	Al Hamriyah, UAE
21:00 UTC+4				Stadium: Al Hamriya Sports Club Stadium

6 March 2026 Pink Ladies Cup	Hong Kong	Cancelled	Russia	Al Hamriyah, UAE
16:00 UTC+4				Stadium: Al Hamriya Sports Club Stadium

3 June Closed Door Friendly	Hong Kong	3–2	Fiji	Tseung Kwan O, Hong Kong
--:-- UTC+8	Chan Yee Hing 10'; Li Hau Yi 50'; Leung Kwong Kit 60'	Report	Leba 70'; Tabunase 80'	Stadium: Jockey Club HKFA Football Training Centre; Attendance: 0

6 June Friendly	Hong Kong	3–1	Fiji	Kowloon, Hong Kong
18:00 UTC+8	Cheung Wai Ki 34'; Leung H.K. 39'; Wei Lan 75'	Report	Naweni 23'	Stadium: Kai Tak Youth Sports Ground; Attendance: 1,261

14 September 2026 Asian Games GS	China	5–1	Hong Kong	Gifu, Japan
19:00 UTC+9	Chen Qiaozhu 14'; Si Yu 38'; Wang Yanwen 48'; Wang Shuang 80', 89'	Report	Cheung Wai Ki 31'	Stadium: Gifu Nagaragawa Stadium; Attendance: 179; Referee: Khin Nyein Chan (Myanmar)

17 September 2026 Asian Games GS	Hong Kong	0–2	Philippines	Gifu, Japan
19:00 UTC+9		Report	Leach 12' Ramirez 63'	Stadium: Gifu Nagaragawa Stadium

21 September 2026 Asian Games GS	Uzbekistan	2–1	Hong Kong	Kariya, Japan
16:00 UTC+9	Khabibullaeva 34'; Shoyimova 90+2'	Report	Wei Lan 65'	Stadium: Wave Stadium Kariya; Attendance: 561; Referee: Park Se-jin (South Korea)

1 December Friendly	Myanmar	v	Hong Kong	Yangon, Myanmar
				Stadium: Thuwunna Stadium

4 December Friendly	Myanmar	v	Hong Kong	Yangon, Myanmar
				Stadium: Thuwunna Stadium

=== All-time results ===
The following table shows the Hong Kong national all-time international record since 2003, correct as of 14 September 2026.

Against	Played	Won	Drawn	Lost	GF	GA	GD
Total	111	33	10	68	134	368	–234

== Coaching staff ==
Position	Name
Head coach	(Brazil) José Ricardo Rambo
Assistant coach	(England) Maria Williams (Hong Kong) Wong Shuk-Fan
Executive manager	(Hong Kong) Fung Cheuk-Chiu
Goalkeeping coach	(Hong Kong) Tsz Him-Wong
Women's lead physical development coach	(Taiwan) Yi-Ting Lin
Head of Performance Analysis	(Republic of Ireland) Christopher Jenkins
Team Doctor	(Hong Kong) Wan Hay-Man
Equipment Team	(Hong Kong) Cheung Tim-Ho
Equipment Team	(Hong Kong) Samuel Chow
Physiotherapist	(Hong Kong) Lo Ho Cheung
Physiotherapist	(Hong Kong) Kwong Hoi-Hang
Physiotherapist	(Hong Kong) Leung Hok-Hin

== Players ==
=== Current squad ===
The following players were called up for the international friendly match against Liechtenstein on 29 November 2025.

No.	Pos.	Player	Date of birth (age)	Caps	Goals	Club
	GK	Leung Wai Nga	24 August 1988 (age 38)			(Football Association of Hong Kong, China) Kitchee
	GK	Ng Cheuk Wai	19 March 1997 (age 29)			(Japan Football Association) FC Zebra Ladies Iwate
	DF	Chung Pui Ki	2 February 1998 (age 28)			(Football Association of Hong Kong, China) Kitchee
	DF	Chu So Kwan	3 March 2004 (age 22)			(Football Association of Hong Kong, China) Kitchee
	DF	Chan Tsz Shan	19 January 2005 (age 21)			(Football Association of Hong Kong, China) Chelsea SS HK
	DF	Ma Chak Shun	2 March 1996 (age 30)			(Football Association of Hong Kong, China) Chelsea SS HK
	DF	Wei Lan	21 May 2006 (age 20)			(Football Association of Hong Kong, China) Grace Citizen
	DF	Sin Chung Yee	28 November 1995 (age 30)			(Philippine Football Federation) Manila Digger
	DF	Lau Nga Ching Katrina	25 May 2005 (age 21)			(Football Association of Hong Kong, China) Grace Citizen
	MF	Ko Pak Ling Lucia	25 October 2007 (age 19)			(The Football Association) Brooke House Football Academy
	MF	Fu Chiu Man	1 October 1999 (age 27)			(Football Association of Hong Kong, China) Kitchee
	MF	Fung Sharon	16 July 1999 (age 27)			(Football Association of Hong Kong, China) WSE
	MF	Chan Wing Lam	25 May 1999 (age 27)			(Football Association of Hong Kong, China) Chelsea SS HK
	MF	Kwan Wing Yu	6 August 2003 (age 23)			(Football Association of Hong Kong, China) Grace Citizen
	MF	Mo Yan Hei	18 January 2007 (age 19)			(Football Association of Hong Kong, China) Grace Citizen
	MF	Wong So Han	26 November 1991 (age 34)			(Football Association of Hong Kong, China) Shatin SA
	MF	Tsang Lai Mae Halasan	28 June 1999 (age 27)			(Football Association of Hong Kong, China) Chelsea SS HK
	MF	Wong Hiu Ting	13 January 1999 (age 27)			(Football Association of Hong Kong, China) Chelsea SS HK
	FW	Wai Yueng Ting	15 October 1992 (age 34)			(Chinese Taipei Football Association) Kaohsiung Attackers
	FW	Chu Po Yan	1 August 2005 (age 21)			(Chinese Football Association) Foshan Hao Bo
	FW	Leung Hong Kiu Anke	29 September 2006 (age 20)			(Football Association of Hong Kong, China) Chelsea SS HK
	FW	Wong Tsz Kiu	1 March 2008 (age 18)			(Football Association of Hong Kong, China) Grace Citizen
	FW	Chan Wing Ching	28 November 2006 (age 19)			(Football Association of Hong Kong, China) Grace Citizen
	FW	Li Hau Yi	22 November 2006 (age 19)			(Football Association of Hong Kong, China) Grace Citizen

=== Recent call-ups ===
The following players have been called up to the squad in the past 12 months.

Pos.	Player	Date of birth (age)	Caps	Goals	Club	Latest call-up

== Competitive record ==
=== FIFA Women's World Cup ===
FIFA Women's World Cup record
Year	Result	Position	GP	W	D*	L	GF	GA	GD
(China) 1991	Did not qualify								
(Sweden) 1995	Did not enter								
(United States) 1999	Did not qualify								
(United States) 2003	Did not qualify								
(China) 2007	Did not qualify								
(Germany) 2011	Did not qualify								
(Canada) 2015	Did not qualify								
(France) 2019	Did not qualify								
(Australia) (New Zealand) 2023	Did not qualify								
(Brazil) 2027	Did not qualify								
(Costa Rica) (Jamaica) (Mexico) (United States) 2031	To be determined								
(United Kingdom) 2035	To be determined								
Total	0/12	–	–	–	–	–	–	–	–

*Draws include knockout matches decided on penalty kicks.

=== Olympic Games ===
Summer Olympics record
Year	Result	GP	W	D*	L	GF	GA	GD
(United States) 1996	Did not enter							
(Australia) 2000	Did not qualify							
(Greece) 2004	Did not qualify							
(China) 2008	Did not qualify							
(United Kingdom) 2012	Did not qualify							
(Brazil) 2016	Did not qualify							
(Japan) 2020	Did not qualify							
(France) 2024	Did not qualify							
(United States) 2028	Did not qualify							
Total	0/8	–	–	–	–	–	–	–

*Draws include knockout matches decided on penalty kicks.

=== AFC Women's Asian Cup ===
AFC Women's Asian Cup record
Year	Result	GP	W	D*	L	GF	GA	GD
(Hong Kong) 1975	Group stage	2	0	0	2	0	4	−4
(Taiwan) 1977	Group stage	2	0	0	2	0	6	−6
(India) 1980	Third place	6	2	0	4	5	8	–3
(Hong Kong) 1981	Fourth place	3	2	1	2	3	3	0
(Thailand) 1983	Group stage	5	0	0	5	0	14	−14
(Hong Kong) 1986	Group stage	3	1	0	2	1	3	−2
(Hong Kong) 1989	Fourth place	5	1	1	3	3	19	–16
(Japan) 1991	Group stage	4	1	1	2	3	9	−6
(Malaysia) 1993	Group stage	4	1	0	2	5	6	−1
(Malaysia) 1995	Group stage	3	1	1	1	2	12	−10
(China) 1997	Group stage	3	0	0	3	0	32	−32
(Philippines) 1999	Group stage	4	0	0	4	0	36	−36
(Chinese Taipei) 2001	Group stage	3	1	0	2	2	15	−13
(Thailand) 2003	Group stage	4	1	0	3	2	24	−22
(Australia) 2006	Did not qualify							
(Vietnam) 2008	Did not qualify							
(China) 2010	Did not qualify							
(Vietnam) 2014	Did not qualify							
(Jordan) 2018	Did not qualify							
(India) 2022	Did not qualify							
(Australia) 2026	Did not qualify							
Total	14/20	57	11	4	42	26	191	–165

*Draws include knockout matches decided on penalty kicks.

=== Asian Games ===
Asian Games record
Host	Result	M	W	D	L	GF	GA	GD
(China) 1990	Sixth place	5	0	0	5	0	32	−32
(Japan) 1994	Did not enter							
(Thailand) 1998	Did not enter							
(South Korea) 2002	Did not enter							
(Qatar) 2006	Did not enter							
(China) 2010	Did not enter							
(South Korea) 2014	Quarter-finals	3	0	0	3	0	19	−19
(Indonesia) 2018	Quarter-finals	4	1	0	3	6	21	−15
(China) 2022	Group-stage	3	0	0	3	1	9	−8
(Japan) 2026	Group-stage	3	0	0	3	2	9	−7
(Qatar) 2030	-	-	-	-	-	-	-	
(Saudi Arabia) 2034	-	-	-	-	-	-	-	
Total	5/10	18	1	0	17	9	90	–81

*Draws include knockout matches decided on penalty kicks.

=== EAFF E-1 Football Championship ===
EAFF E-1 Football Championship record
Host	Result	M	W	D	L	GF	GA	GD
(South Korea) 2005	Did not enter							
(China) 2008	Did not qualify							
(Japan) 2010	Did not qualify							
(South Korea) 2013	Did not qualify							
(China) 2015	Did not qualify							
(Japan) 2017	Did not qualify							
(South Korea) 2019	Did not qualify							
(Japan) 2022	Did not enter							
(South Korea) 2025	Did not qualify							
(China) 2028	Did not enter							
Total	0/10	0	0	0	0	0	0	0

=== Women Guangdong–Hong Kong Cup ===
The Women Guangdong–Hong Kong Cup was established in 2015.

=== Turkish Women's Cup ===
(Turkey) Turkish Women's Cup record
Year	Result	GP	W	D	L	GF	GA	GD
2020	5th place	3	0	0	3	1	14	−13
2023	5th place	2	0	0	2	0	9	−9
2024	4th place	3	0	0	3	0	4	−4
Total	3/5	8	0	0	8	1	27	–26

== See also ==
- Sport in Hong Kong
  - Football in Hong Kong
    - Women's football in Hong Kong
- Hong Kong men's national football team
