= Olga Poryadina =

Russian footballer and coach

Olga Poryadina Ольга Порядина
Personal information
- Full name: Olga Sergeevna Poryadina
- Date of birth: 10 December 1980 (age 45)
- Place of birth: Voronezh, Russian SFSR, Soviet Union
- Height: 1.70 m (5 ft 7 in)
- Position: Defender

Senior career*
Years	Team	Apps	(Gls)
1995–1998	Energiya Voronezh		
1999–2001	Kubanochka		
2002–2005	Lada Togliatti		
2006–2010	WFC Rossiyanka		(10)
2011	Mordovochka		(2)

International career
2003–2011	Russia	16	(1)

Managerial career
- 2020–: зенит
- * Club domestic league appearances and goals

Olga Sergeevna Poryadina (Russian: Ольга Сергеевна Порядина; born 10 December 1980) is a Russian football coach and former defender. She has been head coach of ZFK Zenit Saint Petersburg in the Russian Women's Football Championship since June 2020.

During her playing career, Poryadina played for Energiya Voronezh, Kubanochka Krasnodar, Lada Togliatti, Rossiyanka Krasnoarmeysk, and Mordovochka Saransk, winning five championships with Energiya, Lada and Rossiyanka.

She was a member of the Russian national team, and took part in the 2009 European Championship.

== Coaching career ==
In 2020 she became the first head coach of the newly formed women's team of FC Zenit Saint Petersburg.
