= 2022 Russian Women's Football Championship =

Russian Women's Football Super League
- Season: 2022
- Dates: 13 March – 29 October
- Champions: Zenit Saint Petersburg (1st title)
- Matches: 107
- Goals: 292 (2.73 per match)
- Top goalscorer: Nelli Korovkina (17 goals)

The 2022 Russian Women's Football Super League (Чемпионат России по футболу среди женских команд – Cуперлига-2022) was the 31st season of the Russian women's football top-level league. Lokomotiv Moscow were the defending champion.

== Teams ==
Location of teams

Team	Location	Stadium	Capacity
Chertanovo	Moscow	Arena Chertanovo	490
CSKA	Khimki	Novye Khimki Stadium	3,066
Krasnodar	Krasnodar	Krasnodar Academy Stadium	7,458
Krasnodar	Krasnodar	Krasnodar Academy Stadium Small Arena	1,100
Lokomotiv	Moscow	RZD Arena	27,320
Lokomotiv	Moscow	Sapsan Arena	10,000
Rostov	Rostov-on-Don	Olimp-2	15,840
Rostov	Rostov-on-Don	Lokomotiv Stadium	3,000
Rubin	Kazan	Rubin Stadium	10,000
Ryazan-VDV	Ryazan	Spartak Stadium	6,000
Yenisey	Krasnoyarsk	Football-Arena Yenisey	3,000
Zenit	Saint Petersburg	Smena Stadium Field 1	1,200
Zenit	Saint Petersburg	Smena Stadium Field 5	500
Zvezda-2005	Perm	Zvezda Stadium	17,000
Zvezda-2005	Perm	Indoor arena Perm Velikaya	3,000

== Results ==
=== Regular season ===
Pos	Team	Pld	W	D	L	GF	GA	GD	Pts	Qualification	ZEN	LOK	CSK	ROS	KRA	RUB	CHE	ZVE	YEN	RYA
1	Zenit Saint Petersburg	18	14	4	0	41	4	+37	46	Play-off I		2–0	2–0	3–0	4–0	1–1	3–0	4–0	0–0	2–1
2	Lokomotiv Moscow	18	13	4	1	43	10	+33	43	Play-off I	1–1		0–0	5–2	3–0	3–0	3–0	1–0	5–1	9–0
3	CSKA Moscow	18	13	1	4	34	12	+22	40	Play-off I	0–1	1–2		1–0	4–1	4–0	2–0	2–0	2–0	3–0
4	Rostov	18	7	4	7	18	19	−1	25	Play-off I	0–2	0–1	1–2		3–1	0–0	2–0	1–0	2–1	2–0
5	Krasnodar	18	6	2	10	18	35	−17	20	Play-off II	0–2	1–3	0–4	1–0		3–1	0–2	3–1	1–0	1–1
6	Rubin Kazan	18	4	6	8	12	28	−16	18	Play-off II	0–7	1–1	0–1	0–0	2–0		3–0	2–1	0–0	1–1
7	Chertanovo Moscow	18	5	3	10	15	32	−17	18	Play-off II	0–2	1–3	2–4	0–2	2–1	1–0		0–4	1–1	1–1
8	Zvezda-2005 Perm	18	4	5	9	21	27	−6	17	Play-off II	1–1	0–0	1–2	1–1	2–2	3–0	0–3		0–0	4–2
9	Yenisey Krasnoyarsk	18	4	4	10	16	23	−7	16	Play-off II	0–2	0–1	2–1	0–1	1–2	2–0	1–2	1–2		4–0
10	Ryazan-VDV	18	1	5	12	10	38	−28	8	Play-off II	0–2	0–2	0–1	1–1	0–1	0–1	0–0	2–1	1–2	

Source: RFU
Rules for classification: 1) Points; 2) Head-to-head points; 3) Head-to-head wins; 4) Head-to-head goal difference; 5) Head-to-head goals; 6) Number of wins; 7) Goal difference; 8) Goals scored; 9) Drawing of lots

=== Play-off I ===
The points obtained during the regular season were halved (and rounded up) before the start of the playoff.

Pos	Team	Pld	W	D	L	GF	GA	GD	Pts	ZEN	CSK	LOK	ROS
1	Zenit Saint Petersburg (C)	24	17	6	1	48	7	+41	34		1–1	0–1	3–0
2	CSKA Moscow	24	16	3	5	46	17	+29	31	1–2		3–1	3–0
3	Lokomotiv Moscow	24	15	5	4	49	17	+32	28	0–1	1–1		3–1
4	Rostov	24	8	5	11	20	31	−11	16	0–0	0–3	1–0	

Source: RFU
Rules for classification: 1) Points; 2) Regular season points 3) Head-to-head points; 4) Head-to-head wins; 5) Head-to-head goal difference; 6) Head-to-head goals; 7) Number of wins; 8) Goal difference; 9) Goals scored; 10) Drawing of lots
(C) Champions

=== Play-off II ===
The points obtained during the regular season were halved (and rounded up) before the start of the playoff.

Pos	Team	Pld	W	D	L	GF	GA	GD	Pts	CHE	ZVE	YEN	KRA	RUB	RYA
5	Chertanovo Moscow	23	9	3	11	25	36	−11	21		0–1	4–1			3–1
6	Zvezda-2005 Perm	23	6	7	10	25	30	−5	16			0–0			1–0
7	Yenisey Krasnoyarsk	23	6	6	11	27	29	−2	16				4–0		6–2
8	Krasnodar	23	7	4	12	21	42	−21	15	0–1	2–1			1–1	
9	Rubin Kazan	23	5	9	9	17	33	−16	15	1–2	1–1	0–0			
10	Ryazan-VDV	23	1	6	16	14	50	−36	5				0–0	1–2	

Source: RFU
Rules for classification: 1) Points; 2) Regular season points 3) Head-to-head points; 4) Head-to-head wins; 5) Head-to-head goal difference; 6) Head-to-head goals; 7) Number of wins; 8) Goal difference; 9) Goals scored; 10) Drawing of lots

== Top scorers ==
Rank	Player	Team	Total
1	(Russia) Nelli Korovkina	Lokomotiv Moscow	17
2	(Portugal) Ana Dias	Zenit Saint Petersburg	12
3	(Haiti) Shwendesky Joseph	Rubin Kazan / Zenit Saint Petersburg	9
3	(Russia) Olesya Kurochkina	Zvezda-2005 Perm	9
5	(Russia) Lina Yakupova	Zenit Saint Petersburg	8
5	(Russia) Liana Yukhaeva	Rostov	8
7	(Russia) Daniela Basaeva	Krasnodar	7
7	(Cameroon) Tatiana Ewodo	Yenisey Krasnoyarsk	7
7	(Nigeria) Francisca Ordega	CSKA Moscow	7
7	(Russia) Tatyana Petrova	CSKA Moscow	7
