= Yulia Zapotichnaya =

Russian footballer

Personal information
- Full name: Yulia Zapotichnaya
- Date of birth: 12 July 1989 (age 37)
- Place of birth: Rostov on Don, Soviet Union
- Height: 1.64 m (5 ft 5 in)
- Position: Defender

Team information
- Current team: Zenit
- Number: 6

Senior career*
Years	Team	Apps	(Gls)
2006	Chertanovo		
2007–2008	SKA Rostov		
2009	Lada Togliatti	5	(0)
2010–2012	Energiya Voronezh	41	(1)
2012–2017	Donchanka Azov		
2018	Lokomotiv Moscow	12	(0)
2020–	Zenit	3	(0)

International career
2011	Russia	2	(0)
- * Club domestic league appearances and goals

Yulia Zapotichnaya (Russian: Юлия Запотичная) is a Russian football defender. Currently playing for Zenit in the Top Division. She previously played for FC Chertanovo, SKA Rostov, Lada Togliatti and Energiya Voronezh in the Russian women's football championship.

She was a member of the Russian national team.
