= Women Guangdong–Hong Kong Cup =

- Organiser(s): Hong Kong Football Association
- Founded: December 2015; 10 years ago
- Region: International
- Teams: 2
- Most championships: Guangdong (7 wins)
- 7th Women Guangdong–Hong Kong Cup

The Women Guangdong–Hong Kong Cup (simplified Chinese: 女子省港杯; traditional Chinese: 女子省港盃) is a football competition between two women teams representing Hong Kong and Guangdong Province of China respectively. It was established in 2015.

== History ==
On 31 December 2015, the first Women Guangdong–Hong Kong Cup concluded with the Guangdong team winning 2–0.

== Format ==
The competition is a single match. If the scores are level at the end of 90 minutes, the match goes straight to a penalty shoot-out to determine a winner.

== Past winners ==
Edition	Date	Home team	Score	Away team	Venue	Attendance
1	31 December 2015	Hong Kong	0–2	Guangdong	(Hong Kong) Kowloon Bay Park	
2	2 January 2017	Guangdong	3–0	Hong Kong	(China) Guangdong Provincial People's Stadium	
3	4 January 2018	Hong Kong	1–2	Guangdong	Hong Kong Stadium	
4	6 January 2019	Guangdong	6–2	Hong Kong	(China) Guangdong Provincial People's Stadium	
5	1 February 2024	Hong Kong	2–3	Guangdong	(Hong Kong) Mong Kok Stadium	1,039
6	14 January 2025	Guangdong	4–0	Hong Kong	(China) Tianhe Sports Center	
7	28 December 2025	Hong Kong	0–1	Guangdong	(Hong Kong) Kowloon Bay Park	924

== Winners table ==
Rank	Team	Winners
1st	Guangdong	7
2nd	Hong Kong	0
