= Yulia Bessolova =

Russian footballer (born 1992)

Personal information
- Full name: Yulia Bessolova
- Date of birth: 23 August 1992 (age 34)
- Place of birth: Izhevsk, Russia
- Height: 1.67 m (5 ft 6 in)
- Position: Defender

Team information
- Current team: Dynamo Moscow
- Number: 77

Senior career*
Years	Team	Apps	(Gls)
2008–2010	Energy Voronezh	12	(0)
2011–2014	Izmailovo	50	(3)
2015–2023	Chertanovo Moscow	154	(13)
2024–	Dynamo Moscow	32	(6)

International career^{‡}
2011	Russia U-19	10	(0)
2013–	Russia	5	(0)
- * Club domestic league appearances and goals as of 20 May 2025 ‡ National team caps and goals as of 18 July 2013

Yulia Bessolova (born 23 August 1992) is a Russian footballer. She plays as a defender for Dynamo Moscow. She was described by the Russia national team's former technical director Vera Pauw as a great talent.

== Club career ==
She has played for Izmailovo Moscow since 2011.

== International career ==
She was called up to be part of the national team for the UEFA Women's Euro 2013. On 18 July 2013, she made her debut in a 1–1 draw against Spain.

== Personal life ==
Bessolova was born in Izhevsk.

== Honours ==
Izmailovo Moscow

Runner-up

- Russian Women's Cup: 2013
