= Kristina Komissarova =

Russian footballer (born 2001)

Personal information
- Full name: Kristina Olegovna Komissarova
- Date of birth: 24 February 2001 (age 25)
- Place of birth: Tolyatti, Russia
- Height: 1.64 m (5 ft 5 in)
- Position: Midfielder

Team information
- Current team: Dynamo Moscow
- Number: 9

Senior career*
Years	Team	Apps	(Gls)
2017–2021	Chertanovo Moscow	61	(12)
2022–	Dynamo Moscow	63	(23)

International career^{‡}
2017–	Russia	6	(0)
- * Club domestic league appearances and goals as of 20 May 2025 ‡ National team caps and goals as of 19:24, 30 August 2019 (UTC)

Kristina Olegovna Komissarova (Russian: Кристина Олеговна Комиссарова; born 24 February 2001) is a Russian footballer who plays as a midfielder for Dynamo Moscow and has appeared for the Russia women's national team.

== Career ==
Komissarova has been capped for the Russia national team, appearing for the team during the 2019 FIFA Women's World Cup qualifying cycle.

== International goals ==
No.	Date	Venue	Opponent	Score	Result	Competition
1.	26 October 2024	Emirhan Sports Complex, Antalya, Turkey	Kenya	4–0	4–0	2024 Pink Ladies Cup
