= Anna Sas =

Belarusian footballer

Personal information
- Date of birth: 6 October 2003 (age 23)
- Place of birth: Minsk, Belarus
- Height: 1.72 m (5 ft 8 in)
- Position: Midfielder

Team information
- Current team: Dynamo Moscow
- Number: 71

Senior career*
Years	Team	Apps	(Gls)
2020–2021	FC Minsk	45	(26)
2022	Carl Zeiss Jena	7	(0)
2022–2023	Czarni Sosnowiec		
2023	Fatih Karagümrük		
2024	Dinamo Minsk	27	(8)
2025–	Dynamo Moscow	8	(0)

International career^{‡}
2018–2019	Belarus U17	12	(0)
2020–	Belarus	2	(0)
- * Club domestic league appearances and goals as of 20 May 2025 ‡ National team caps and goals as of 22 September 2020

Anna Sas (born 6 October 2003) is a Belarusian footballer who plays as a midfielder for Russian Women's Football Championship club Dynamo Moscow and the Belarus women's national team.
