= Gabriela Grzywińska =

Polish footballer (born 1996)

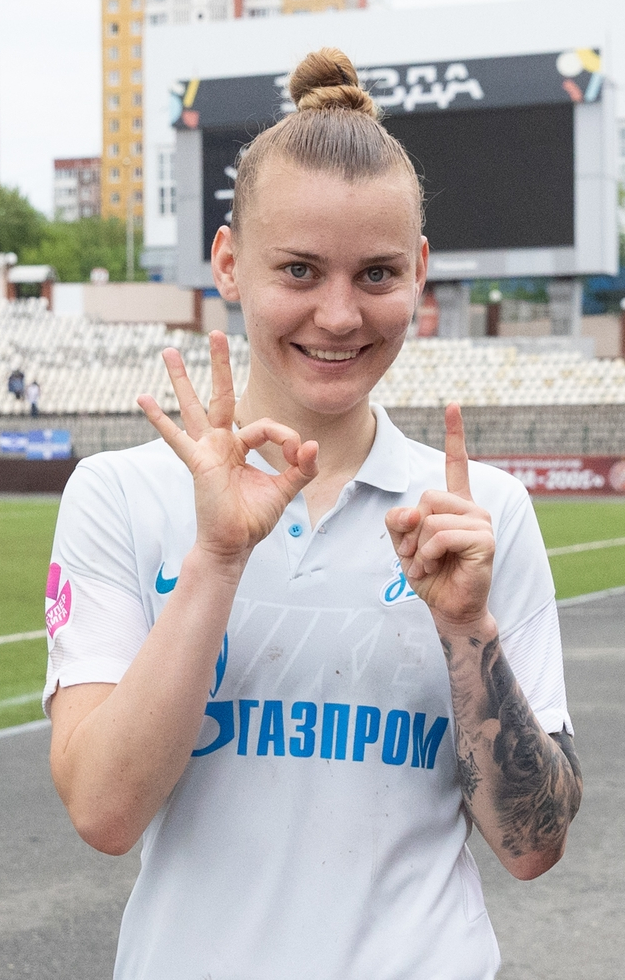
- Grzywińska with Zenit in 2021

Personal information
- Date of birth: 18 February 1996 (age 30)
- Place of birth: Kraków, Poland
- Height: 1.70 m (5 ft 7 in)
- Position: Midfielder

Team information
- Current team: Spartak Moscow
- Number: 51

Senior career*
Years	Team	Apps	(Gls)
–2012	Wanda Kraków		
2013–2014	Unia Racibórz		(0)
2014–2016	Medyk Konin		(0)
2016–2019	Górnik Łęczna	68	(24)
2019–2021	Medyk Konin	21	(4)
2021–2025	Zenit Saint Petersburg	116	(39)
2026–	Spartak Moscow	9	(5)

International career
2013	Poland U17		
2013–2022	Poland	55	(2)
Medal record
Representing Poland
Women's football
UEFA Women's Under-17 Championship
Winner	2013 Switzerland
- * Club domestic league appearances and goals as of 08:58, 3 June 2026 (UTC)

Gabriela Grzywińska (born 18 February 1996) is a Polish professional footballer who plays as a midfielder for Russian club Spartak Moscow. She is a former member of the Poland national team.

== Career ==
At the beginning of 2013, after four years of playing for Wanda Kraków, the player joined Unia Racibórz, with whom she won the Polish Championship title in the 2012–13 season. In June 2013, during the UEFA Women's Under-17 Championship, the footballer secured gold medals with the Polish U-17 national team.

In January 2014, due to financial difficulties faced by Unia Racibórz, she transferred to Medyk Konin along with Ewelina Kamczyk. With Medyk Konin, she won the Polish championship and Polish Cup in both 2014 and 2015. In 2013, she debuted in the Poland national team. After the conclusion of the 2015–16 season, she transferred to Górnik Łęczna. On 13 August 2016, she scored her first goal in the Ekstraliga, with Górnik Łęczna defeating UKS SMS Łódź 4–1; it was her 59th match in the top division.

In the 2017–18 season, she helped Górnik Łęczna secure its first-ever Polish championship title (three rounds before the end of the season, when Górnik defeated AZS PWSZ Wałbrzych 2–1 in the 24th round) and the Polish Cup, with Górnik defeating Czarni Sosnowiec 3–1 in the final.

In 2021, she joined Russian club Zenit Saint Petersburg. Due to Russia's invasion of Ukraine in 2022 and her continued participation with this club, she stopped being called up to the Polish national team.

In December 2025, she signed a three-year deal with Spartak Moscow.

== Career statistics ==
=== International ===
Appearances and goals by national team and year
National team	Year	Apps	Goals
Poland	2013	1	0
Poland	2014	2	0
Poland	2015	6	0
Poland	2016	2	0
Poland	2017	9	0
Poland	2018	7	2
Poland	2019	8	0
Poland	2020	6	0
Poland	2021	8	0
Poland	2022	6	0
Total		55	2

Scores and results list Poland's goal tally first, score column indicates score after each Grzywińska goal.

List of international goals scored by Gabriela Grzywińska
No.	Date	Venue	Opponent	Score	Result	Competition
1	9 October 2018	Municipal Stadium, Ostróda, Poland	Republic of Ireland	2–0	4–0	Friendly
2	13 November 2018	Municipal Stadium, Kluczbork, Poland	Bosnia and Herzegovina	4–0	4–0	Friendly

== Honours ==
Medyk Konin

- Ekstraliga: 2014–15, 2015–16
- Polish Cup: 2014–15 2015–16

Górnik Łęczna

- Ekstraliga: 2017–18, 2018–19, 2019–20
- Polish Cup: 2017–18, 2019–20

Zenit

- Russian Women's Football Championship: 2022, 2023, 2024
- Russian Supercup: 2023

Poland U17

- UEFA Women's Under-17 Championship: 2013

Individual

- Russian Women's Football Championship top scorer: 2024
