= ZFK Dynamo Moscow =

Dynamo Moscow
- Full name: Женский Футбольный клуб Динамо Москва (Women's Football Club Dynamo Moscow)
- Nicknames: Belo-golubye (White-blues); Dinamiki (Loudspeakers)
- Founded: 2 December 2021; 3 years ago
- Ground: VTB Arena, Moscow
- Capacity: 26,319
- Owner: VTB Bank (through "Dynamo Management Company")
- Manager: Aleksandr Katasonov
- League: Russian Championship
- 2025: 7th
- Website: http://fcdm.ru/
Home colours	Away colours

ZFK Dynamo Moscow (Russian: ЖФК Динамо Москва) is the women's team of Russian football club FC Dynamo Moscow. The club participates in the Russian Women's Football Championship, the top division of Russian women football.

== History ==
The original Dynamo's women team has been founded on 2 December 2021, by support of VTB as women's department of FC Dynamo, to take part in the Russian championship starting from 2022 season.

== Current squad ==
As of 20 May 2025

Note: Flags indicate national team as defined under FIFA eligibility rules; some limited exceptions apply. Players may hold more than one non-FIFA nationality.

No.	Pos.	Nation	Player
1	GK	RUS	Arina Taranchenko
3	DF	RUS	Nadezhda Koltakova
6	FW	USA	Kaylan Williams
7	MF	RUS	Irina Dricheva
8	MF	RUS	Elina Samoylova
9	FW	RUS	Kristina Komissarova
10	FW	RUS	Elena Shesternyova
11	DF	RUS	Milena Nikitina
13	DF	RUS	Kamilla Abashilova
15	DF	RUS	Maria Digurova
16	GK	RUS	Anastasiya Schervyanina
19	FW	BLR	Anastasiya Kobalyova
20	FW	UGA	Fauzia Najjemba
21	MF	TUR	Berivan İçen

No.	Pos.	Nation	Player
22	MF	SRB	Isidora Vučković
24	DF	SRB	Željka Belovan
27	GK	RUS	Diana Ponomaryova
30	MF	RUS	Ekaterina Sergeeva
38	MF	RUS	Daniella Petrova
44	MF	BLR	Anastasiya Shlapakova
71	MF	BLR	Anna Sas
77	MF	RUS	Yulia Bessolova
79	DF	RUS	Maria Galay
81	MF	RUS	Tatyana Danilochkina
86	DF	RUS	Darya Guskova
91	FW	RUS	Daniela Basaeva
99	DF	MNE	Helena Božić

== League and cup history ==
Season	Div.	Pos.	Pl.	W	D	L	GS	GA	P	Cup	Europe
2022	Women's Football League										

== See also ==
- Dynamo Moscow
- Dynamo Moscow (women's basketball)
