= Kurbatovo, Voronezh Oblast =

Kurbatovo Курбатово
- Settlement
- Location within Voronezh Oblast Location within Russia
- Coordinates: 51°38′N 38°34′E
- Country: Russia
- Region: Voronezh Oblast
- District: Nizhnedevitsky District
- Time zone: UTC+3:00

Kurbatovo (Russian: Курбатово) is a rural locality (a settlement) and the administrative center of Kurbatovskoye Rural Settlement, Nizhnedevitsky District, Voronezh Oblast, Russia. The population was 2,207 as of 2010. There are 17 streets.

== Geography ==
Kurbatovo is located 31 km northeast of Nizhnedevitsk (the district's administrative centre) by road. Verkhneye Turovo is the nearest rural locality.
