= Shwendesky Joseph =

Haitian footballer (born 1997)

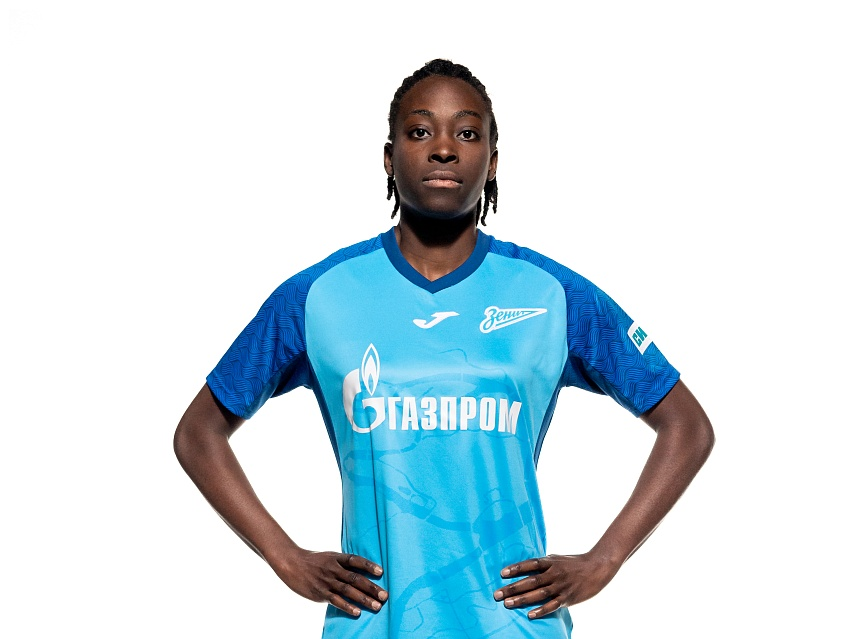

Personal information
- Full name: Shwendesky Macelus Joseph
- Date of birth: November 18, 1997 (age 28)
- Place of birth: Haiti
- Height: 1.78 m (5 ft 10 in)
- Position: Forward

Team information
- Current team: Zenit

Senior career*
Years	Team	Apps	(Gls)
2022	Rubin Kazan	15	(7)
2022–	Zenit	28	(7)

International career
2023–	Haiti	1	(0)
- * Club domestic league appearances and goals as of 23 January 2024 (UTC)

Shwendesky Marcelus Joseph (born 18 November 1997) is a Haitian footballer who plays as a striker for Zenit.

== Early life ==
Joseph was born in 1997 in Delmas and grew up in Pernier, playing football from an early age.

== College career ==
Joseph obtained a degree in civil engineering while attending university in Russia.

== Club career ==
Besides Haiti, Joseph has played in Russia. She is nicknamed "Kiki".

== International career ==
After missing the two intercontinental play-off matches with Haiti against Senegal and Chile, to prepare for the senior 2023 FIFA Women's World Cup, national coach Nicolas Delépine called up Schwendesky for friendly matches.

== Style of play ==
Joseph is known for her speed and composure in front of goal. She mainly operates as a striker.

== Personal life ==
Joseph has two sisters., one of which practices obstetrics and gynecology in South Carolina.
