= Yulia Grichenko =

Russian footballer (born 1990)

Personal information
- Full name: Yulia Grichenko
- Date of birth: 10 March 1990 (age 36)
- Place of birth: Bataysk, Russian SFSR, Soviet Union
- Height: 1.75 m (5 ft 9 in)
- Position: Goalkeeper

Team information
- Current team: Zenit
- Number: 1

Senior career*
Years	Team	Apps	(Gls)
2010–2015	Kubanochka Krasnodar	73	(0)
2016	Rossiyanka	12	(0)
2018–2019	Lokomotiv Moscow	13	(0)
2020–	Zenit	26	(0)

International career^{‡}
2013–	Russia	14	(0)
Medal record
Women's football
Representing Russia
Summer Universiade
Bronze medal – third place	2017 Taipei	Women's
- * Club domestic league appearances and goals as of 28 February 2020 (UTC) ‡ National team caps and goals as of 6 October 2016 (UTC)

Yulia Sergeyevna Grichenko (Russian: Юлия Сергеевна Гриченко; born 10 March 1990) is a Russian footballer. She plays as a goalkeeper for Zenit in the Russian Championship and the Russia national team.

== Club career ==
She played five seasons for Kubanochka Krasnodar from 2010 until 2015. She moved to Rossiyanka ahead of the 2016 season.

Since February 2020 she plays as a goalkeeper for ZFK Zenit Saint Petersburg.

== International career ==
She was called up to be part of the national team for the UEFA Women's Euro 2013.

== Personal life ==
Grichenko was born in Bataysk.
