= Lina Yakupova =

Russian footballer

Personal information
- Full name: Lina Arbievna Yakupova
- Date of birth: 6 September 1990 (age 36)
- Place of birth: Gulkevichi, Russia,
- Position: Forward

Team information
- Current team: Zenit

Senior career*
Years	Team	Apps	(Gls)
2011–2012	Zorkiy	14	(1)
2012–2013	Kubanochka Krasnodar	17	(3)
2018–2020	Lokomotiv Moscow	48	(11)
2021–	Zenit	41	(10)

International career^{‡}
2019–	Russia	7	(0)
- * Club domestic league appearances and goals as of 20:30, 13 August 2022 (UTC) ‡ National team caps and goals as of 21:35, 31 October 2019 (UTC)

Lina Arbievna Yakupova (Russian: Лина Арбиевна Якупова; born 6 September 1990) is a Russian footballer who plays as a forward for Zenit and has appeared for the Russia women's national team.

== Career ==
Yakupova has been capped for the Russia national team, appearing for the team during the 2019 FIFA Women's World Cup qualifying cycle.

== International goals ==
No.	Date	Venue	Opponent	Score	Result	Competition
1.	30 November 2023	National Women Training Center, Asunción, Paraguay	Paraguay	1–0	3–0	Friendly
