= Yana Sheina =

Russian footballer (born 2000)

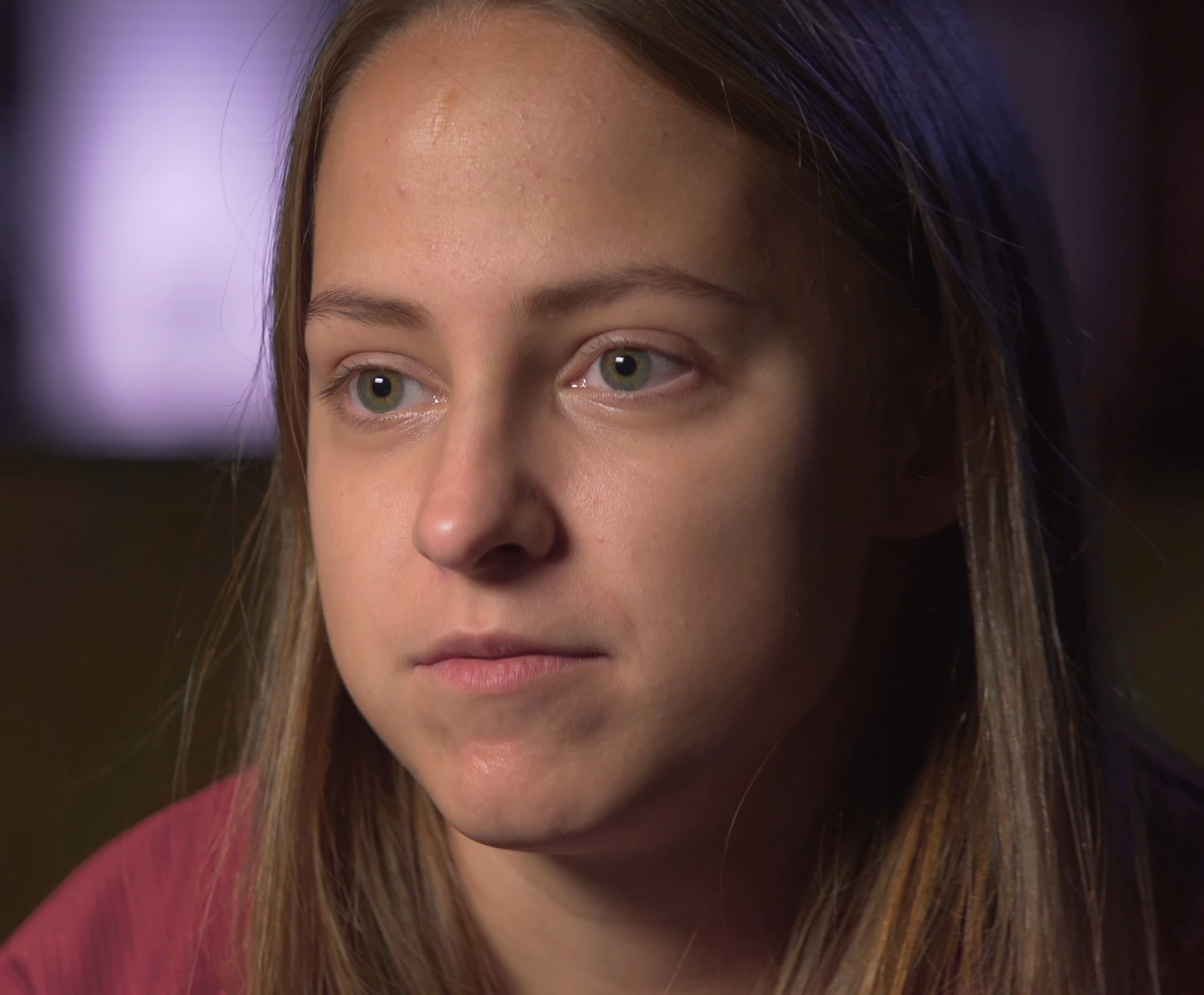
- Sheina in 2021

Personal information
- Full name: Yana Sheina
- Date of birth: 23 June 2000 (age 26)
- Place of birth: Russia,
- Height: 5 ft 2 in (1.58 m)
- Position: Midfielder

Team information
- Current team: Lokomotiv Moscow
- Number: 16

Youth career
- Lokomotiv Moscow

Senior career*
Years	Team	Apps	(Gls)
2018–	Lokomotiv Moscow	132	(37)

International career^{‡}
2017-2018	Russia U17	6	(0)
2018-2019	Russia U19	9	(0)
2019-	Russia	3	(0)
- * Club domestic league appearances and goals as of 20 May 2025 ‡ National team caps and goals as of 30 January 2020 (UTC)

Yana Sheina (born 23 June 2000) is a Russian footballer who plays as a midfielder for Lokomotiv Moscow and has appeared for the Russia women's national team.

== Career ==
Sheina has been capped for the Russia national team, appearing for the team during the UEFA Women's Euro 2021 qualifying cycle.

== International goals ==
No.	Date	Venue	Opponent	Score	Result	Competition
1.	20 February 2021	Gold City Sports Complex, Kargıcak, Turkey	India	4–0	8–0	2021 Turkish Women's Cup
2.	30 November 2023	National Women Training Center, Asunción, Paraguay	Paraguay	2–0	3–0	Friendly
3.	8 October 2023	Kishore Bharati Krirangan, Kolkata, India	India	1–0	4–0	Friendly
