= Kaylan Williams =

American soccer player (born 1998)

Personal information
- Full name: Kaylan Rose Bradford Williams
- Date of birth: July 27, 1998 (age 28)
- Place of birth: Fort Wayne, Indiana, United States
- Height: 1.78 m (5 ft 10 in)
- Position: Striker

Team information
- Current team: Dynamo Moscow
- Number: 6

College career
Years	Team	Apps	(Gls)
2016–2019	New Hampshire Wildcats		

Senior career*
Years	Team	Apps	(Gls)
2020–2021	FC Ramat HaSharon		
2021–2022	WFC Lokomotiv Moscow	29	(2)
2023–	Dynamo Moscow	57	(23)
- * Club domestic league appearances and goals as of May 20, 2025

Kaylan Rose Bradford Williams (born July 27, 1998) is an American soccer player who plays as a striker for Dynamo Moscow.

== Early life ==
Williams grew up in Marion, Indiana, United States.

== Career ==
Williams played for Russian side WVC Dynamo Moscow, where she was regarded as one of the club's most important players.

== Style of play ==
Williams mainly operates as a striker and was described as "at Dinamo, she has been playing primarily as a number nine in attack, after playing as a right-sided center back in pre-season".

== Personal life ==
Williams has aspired to become a surgeon.
