= Ana Dias (footballer) =

Portuguese footballer (born 1997)

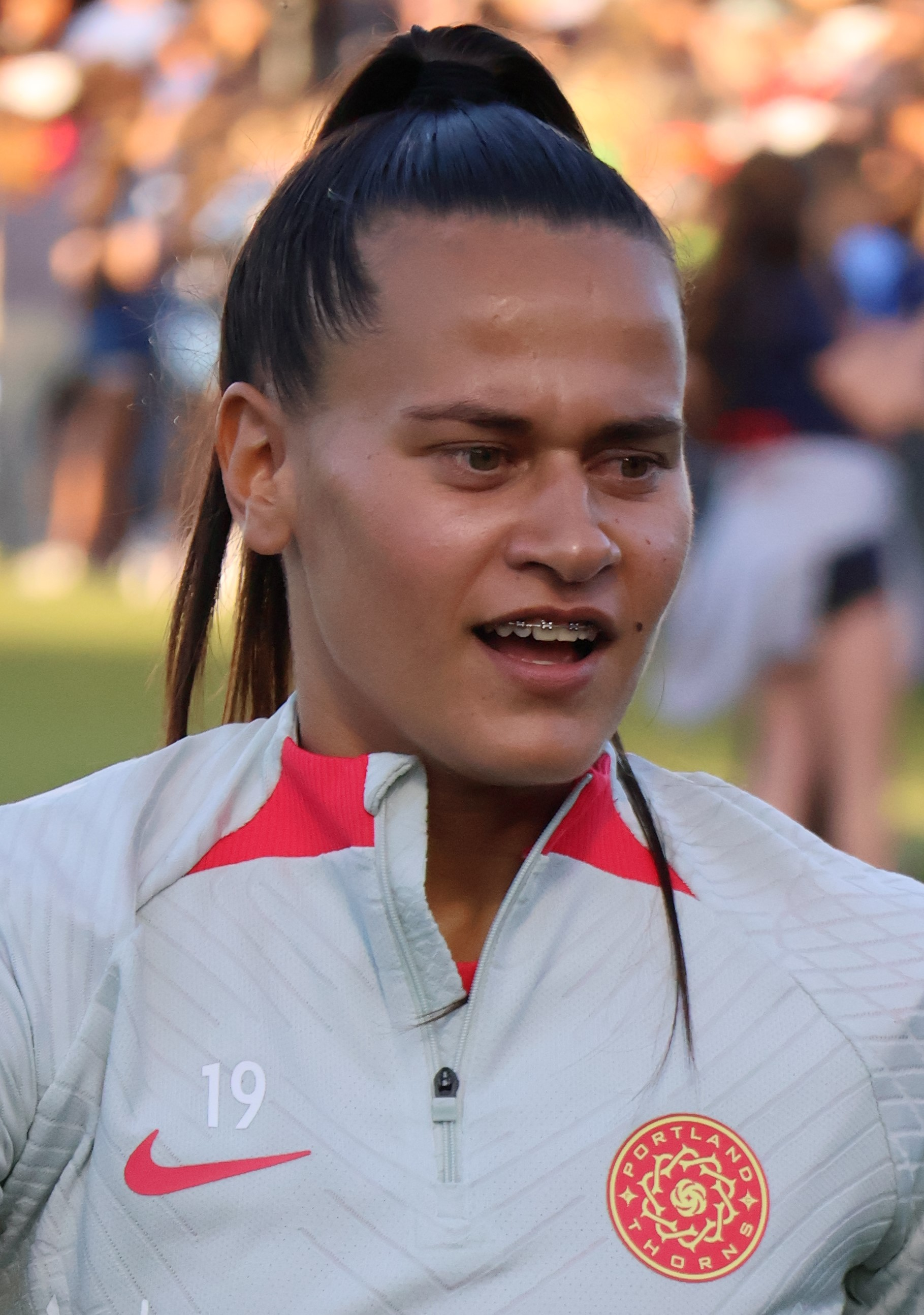
- Dias with the Portland Thorns FC in 2024

Personal information
- Full name: Ana Inês Costa Mendes Dias
- Date of birth: 2 October 1997 (age 29)
- Place of birth: Aveiro, Portugal
- Height: 1.71 m (5 ft 7 in)
- Position: Forward

Team information
- Current team: ABB Fomget
- Number: 18

Senior career*
Years	Team	Apps	(Gls)
2021–2023	Zenit Saint Petersburg	70	(36)
2024	Portland Thorns FC	10	(1)
2024–2025	UANL	35	(7)
2025–	ABB Fomget	4	(4)

International career^{‡}
2016	Portugal U-19	1	(0)
2022–	Portugal	15	(0)
- * Club domestic league appearances and goals as of 20 June 2025 ‡ National team caps and goals as of 20 June 2025

Ana Inês Costa Mendes Dias (born 2 October 1997) is a Portuguese professional footballer who plays as a forward for Liga MX Femenil club Tigres UANL and the Portugal national team. She previously played for Russian club Zenit Saint Petersburg and NWSL side Portland Thorns FC.

== Early life ==
Dias was born in 1997 in Aveiro, Portugal, and joined the youth academy of Portuguese side Vaguense as a youth player.

== College career ==
Dias has received a degree in higher education.

== Club career ==
Dias started her senior career with Portuguese side Cadima, before singing for A-dos-Francos. During the 2019/20 season, Dias made seventeen appearances and scored forty goals.

=== Zenit Saint Petersburg, 2021–2023 ===
In 2021, she signed for Russian side Zenit. She adapted quickly. She scored three goals during her first three appearances for the club.

During the 2022 season, she scored nine goals and recorded three assists during her first thirteen appearances that season. By the end of the 2022 season, she was the top scorer of Zenit and the second-highest top scorer in the league with twelve goals. That season, she also helped the club win their first league title and reach the final of the 2022 Russian Women's Cup.

=== Portland Thorns, 2024 ===
On 20 March 2024, Portland Thorns FC acquired Dias and signed her to a one-year contract with a mutual option for 2025. Dias scored her first goal for the Thorns on 17 May 2024, contributing to a 2–0 victory over the Houston Dash.

=== Tigres UANL, 2024–2025 ===
Dias was transferred to Liga MX Femenil club Tigres UANL for an undisclosed transfer fee on 26 August 2024.

== International career ==
In 2023, Dias was called up to the Portugal women's national team. She made one previous appearance for the team.

== Style of play ==
Dias is known for her mobility, speed, technical ability, and aerial ability.
