= ZFK Zenit Saint Petersburg =

Zenit
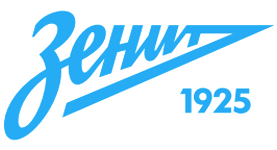
- Full name: Женский Футбольный Клуб Зенит СПб
- Founded: 21 January 2020; 6 years ago
- Ground: Smena Stadium
- Capacity: 3000
- Owner: Gazprom
- President: Alexander Medvedev
- Head coach: Olga Poryadina
- League: Russian Championship
- Website: w.fc-zenit.ru
Home colours	Away colours

ZFK Zenit Saint Petersburg (Russian: ЖФК Зенит СПб) is the women's team of Russian football club FC Zenit Saint Petersburg. The club participates in the Russian Women's Football Championship, the top division of Russian women football.

== History ==
The original Zenit's women team has been founded on 21 January 2020, by support of Gazprom as women's department of FC Zenit, to take part in the Russian championship starting from 2020 season.

== League and cup history ==
Season	Division	Super	League	Pl.	W	D	L	GS	GA	P	Cup	Europe	Top scorer (league)	Head coach
2020	Supreme Division Women	-	5	14	4	3	7	14	14	15	QF	—	(Russia) Nika Belova (3)	(Russia) Poryadina
2021	Supreme Division Women	-	Bronze medal	27	15	5	7	23	40	50	Silver medal	—	?	(Russia) Poryadina
2022	Supreme Division Women	-	Gold medal	24	17	6	1	48	7	34	Silver medal	—	?	(Russia) Poryadina
2023	Supreme Division Women	Gold medal	Gold medal	27	22	4	1	65	10	41	Silver medal	N/E	(Portugal) Ana Dias (18)	(Russia) Poryadina
2024	Supreme Division Women	Silver medal	UNDEFEATED	24	22	0	2	65	8	68	QF	N/E		(Russia) Poryadina
2025	Supreme Division Women	Gold medal	Bronze medal	24	16	4	4	49	13	52	~	N/E		

~ Upgraded to Gold (from Silver) after disqualification of the other finalist.

== Players ==
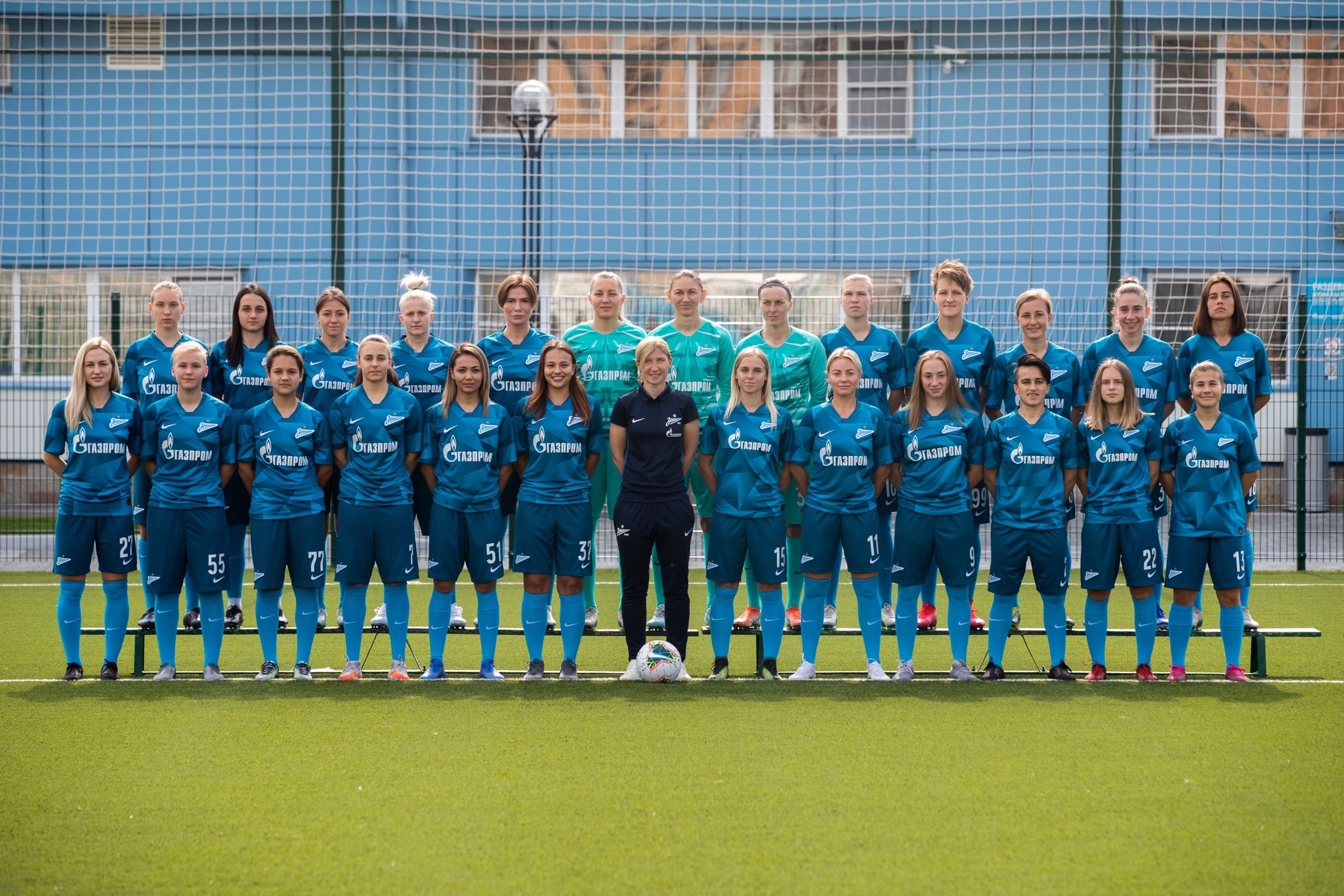

=== Current squad ===
As of 12 September 2022.

Note: Flags indicate national team as defined under FIFA eligibility rules; some limited exceptions apply. Players may hold more than one non-FIFA nationality.

No.	Pos.	Nation	Player
1	GK	RUS	Yulia Grichenko
—	DF	RUS	Lyudmila Shadrina
—	DF	RUS	Vera Simanovskaya
—	FW	RUS	Elena Shesterneva
—	MF	RUS	Zarina Sharifova
—	MF	RUS	Nika Belova
—	DF	RUS	Veronika Kuropatkina
—	MF	RUS	Ekaterina Sochneva
—	MF	RUS	Elizavita Lazareva
—	FW	RUS	Lina Yakupova
—	MF	RUS	Anastasia Pozdeeva
—	DF	SRB	Aleksandra Lazarević
—	DF	RUS	Lyubov Kipyatkova

No.	Pos.	Nation	Player
—	FW	RUS	Ksenia Oleksyuk
—	FW	RUS	Slaviana Astankova
—	DF	RUS	Ksenia Tsybutovich
—	FW	POR	Ana Dias
—	MF	POL	Gabriela Grzywińska
—	FW	RUS	Ekaterina Pantyukhina
—	FW	MNE	Armisa Kuč
—	GK	BLR	Natalia Voskobovich
—	MF	RUS	Daria Eremenkova
—	MF	RUS	Natalia Trofimova
—	FW	RUS	Elena Kostareva (on loan from Krasnodar)
—	FW	HAI	Kiki

== Notable players ==
Russia

- (Russia) Yulia Grichenko
- (Russia) Ekaterina Morozova
- (Russia) Yulia Zapotichnaya
- (Russia) Ekaterina Sochneva

== Club officials ==
=== Management ===
Position	Name
Head coach	(Russia) Olga Poryadina

=== Presidents ===
Name	Period
(Russia) Alexander Medvedev	2020–

=== Head coaches ===
Name	Period
(Russia) Olga Poryadina	January 21, 2020 – present

== Kit suppliers ==
Period	Kit manufacturers
2020–	Nike

== See also ==
- WFC Rossiyanka
- ZFK CSKA Moscow
