= Russia women's national football team =

Women's national association football team representing Russia

Russia
- Association: Football Union of Russia
- Confederation: UEFA (Europe)
- Head coach: Yuri Krasnozhan
- Most caps: Svetlana Petko (144)
- Top scorer: Natalia Barbashina (46)
- Home stadium: Rossiyanka
- FIFA code: RUS
First colours	Second colours

FIFA ranking
- Current: 27 (20 October 2026)
- Highest: 11 (July – August 2003; August 2004)
- Lowest: 28 (June – December 2025)

First international
- Soviet Union 4–1 Bulgaria (Kazanlak, Bulgaria; 26 March 1990); Hungary 0–0 Russia (Budapest, Hungary; 17 May 1992)

Biggest win
- Russia 8–0 Kazakhstan (Krasnoarmeysk, Russia; 25 August 2010); Russia 8–0 Macedonia (Podolsk, Russia; 31 March 2012); India 0–8 Russia (Kolkata, India; 11 October 2026)

Biggest defeat
- Germany 9–0 Russia (Cottbus, Germany; 21 September 2013)

World Cup
- Appearances: 2 (first in 1999)
- Best result: Quarterfinal (1999, 2003)

European Championship
- Appearances: 5 (first in 1997)
- Best result: Group stage (1997, 2001, 2009, 2013, 2017)
Medal record
Women's football
Representing Russia
Summer Universiade
Bronze medal – third place	2017 Taipei	Women's
Bronze medal – third place	2019 Naples	Women's

The Russia women's national football team represents Russia in international women's football. The team is controlled by the Russian Football Union and affiliated with UEFA. Yuri Krasnozhan replaced Elena Fomina as coach of the team in December 2020.

Russia qualified for two World Cups, 1999, 2003 and five European Championships, 1997, 2001, 2009, 2013 and 2017.

As the men's team, the Russian women's national team is the direct successor of the CIS and USSR women's national teams.

On 28 February 2022, due to the Russian invasion of Ukraine and in accordance with a recommendation by the International Olympic Committee (IOC), FIFA and UEFA suspended the participation of Russia, including in the UEFA Women's Euro 2022. The Russian Football Union unsuccessfully appealed the FIFA and UEFA bans to the Court of Arbitration for Sport, which upheld the bans.

== History ==
=== 20th Century ===
The USSR women's national team (who became the Commonwealth of Independent States during the campaign) reached the 1993 UEFA European Women's Championship quarter-finals at their only attempt and Russia were to match that two years later, with both teams losing to Germany over two legs. In 1997, they qualified directly for the final tournament but once there were defeated by Sweden, France – who they had beaten in the preliminaries – and Spain. However, they were among six European sides to qualify for the 1999 FIFA Women's World Cup, thanks to two 2–1 play-off wins against Finland, and victories over Japan and Canada earned them a quarter-final, where they lost to eventual runners-up China.

=== After the turn of the 21st century ===
They cruised unbeaten into the 2001 continental finals but managed only a point against England in the group stage. Russia's qualifying run then continued in the 2003 Women's World Cup and they again reached the quarter-finals before a 7–1 loss to Germany. That preceded something of a decline in fortunes as Finland avenged their 1999 reverse by beating Russia in the play-offs for the UEFA Women's Euro 2005, before Russia had the misfortune to draw Germany in 2007 World Cup qualifying.

=== Present ===
A young member of the 2003 squad, Elena Danilova, inspired victory in the 2005 UEFA European Women's Under-19 Championship, their first post-Soviet national team title at any level. Although the striker suffered injury problems, many of her colleagues graduated to the senior squad, with Russia eventually reaching the 2009 finals with an away-goals play-off success against Scotland. At the final tournament, Russia were drawn against Sweden, Italy and England in Group C. The team was unable to get past the group stage and finished last as they lost all the three matches, scoring 2 and conceding 8.

In the 2011 FIFA Women's World Cup Qualifiers, Russia were drawn in Group 6 with Switzerland, Republic of Ireland, Israel and Kazakhstan, where Russia was eliminated in the group stage as they ended the stage behind Switzerland.

On 13 April 2021, Russia defeated Portugal 1–0 to qualify for UEFA Women's Euro 2022. However, on 28 February 2022, due to the 2022 Russian invasion of Ukraine and in accordance with a recommendation by the International Olympic Committee (IOC), FIFA and UEFA suspended the participation of Russia, including in the UEFA Women's Euro 2022. The Russian Football Union unsuccessfully appealed the FIFA and UEFA bans to the Court of Arbitration for Sport, which upheld the bans.

As of 2022 the Russian national football team has kept playing friendlies and invitational tournaments, such as in Ghana and India.

== Team image ==
=== Kits and crest ===
Russia's home kit consists of marron-red shirt, red shorts, and red-white socks. Their away kit consists of white jersey and light blue shorts and light-blue-white socks.

=== Home stadium ===
The Russia women's national football team plays their home matches on the Rossiyanka Stadium.

== Results and fixtures ==
The following is a list of match results in the last 12 months, as well as any future matches that have been scheduled.

Legend

Win Draw Loss Void or postponed Fixture

=== 2025 ===
27 November Friendly	North Korea	5–2	Russia	Pyongyang, North Korea
15:00 UTC+9	Ri Myong-gum 19'; Myong Yu-jong 30', 60' (pen.); Han Jin-hong 73'; Kim Song-gyong 87'	Report	Zharkova 8'; Kozhnikova 50'	Stadium: Kim Il Sung Stadium

30 November Friendly	North Korea	1–1	Russia	Pyongyang, North Korea
15:00 UTC+9	Ri Hak 90'	Report	Butkevich 34'	Stadium: Kim Il Sung Stadium

=== 2026 ===
28 February 2026 Pink Ladies Cup	Russia	4–1	Tanzania	Al Hamriyah, United Arab Emirates
21:00 UTC+4	Yuklyaeva 1'; Smirnova 43' (pen.), 65'; Lushnikova 82'	Report	Gerald 85'	Stadium: Al Hamriya Sports Club Stadium; Attendance: 2,500; Referee: Yahya Al Mulla (United Arab Emirates)

3 March 2026 Pink Ladies Cup	Russia	0–4	Ghana	Al Hamriyah, United Arab Emirates
16:00 UTC+4		Report	Nyamekye 8'; Bonsu (yellow card) 14'; Boaduwaa 18', 33'; Björkegren (yellow card) 32'; Zakaria (yellow card) 68' (goal) 88'	Stadium: Al Hamriya Sports Club Stadium

6 March 2026 Pink Ladies Cup	Hong Kong	Cancelled	Russia	Al Hamriyah, United Arab Emirates
16:00 UTC+4				Stadium: Al Hamriya Sports Club Stadium

3 June Friendly	China	1–2	Russia	Wuhan, China
19:35 UTC+8				Stadium: Wuhan Five Rings Sports Center

7 June Friendly	China	0–1	Russia	Wuhan, China
19:00 UTC+8				Stadium: Wuhan Tazihu Football Training Center

8 October Friendly	India	0–4	Russia	Kolkata, India
18:00 UTC+5:30		AIFF; RFU	Sheina 41'; Petukhova 60', 65'; Svistunova 81'	Stadium: Kishore Bharati Krirangan; Referee: Virendha Rai (Bhutan)

11 October Friendly	India	0–8	Russia	Kolkata, India
--:-- UTC+5:30		AIFF RFU	Ishmukhametova 21', 43' (pen.); Achoian 25', 45+1'; Kishmakhova 29'; Mashina 50', 51'; Semenova 74'	Stadium: Kishore Bharati Krirangan; Referee: Virendha Rai (Bhutan)

- Russia Results and Fixtures – SoccerWay.com
- Russia Results and Fixtures –globalsportsarchive
- worldfootball.net

== All Record ==
Last Update: 5 April 2024

https://www.worldfootball.net/teams/russland-frauen-team/21/

279 Game 131 W 38 D 108 L 471 GF 399 GA +72 GD

== Coaching staff ==
=== Current coaching staff ===
Position	Name	Ref.
Head coach	(Russia) Yuri Krasnozhan	

=== Manager history ===
1989–1994	(Soviet Union) (Russia) Oleg Lapshin
1994–2008	(Russia) Yuri Bystritsky
2008–2011	(Russia) Igor Shalimov
2011	(Netherlands) Vera Pauw
2011–2012	(France) Farid Benstiti
2012	(Russia) Vladimir Antonov
2012–2015	(Russia) Sergei Lavrentyev
2015–2020	(Russia) Elena Fomina
2020–present	(Russia) Yuri Krasnozhan

== Players ==
=== Current squad ===
The following players were called up for the friendly matches against China on 3 and 7 June 2026.

Caps and goals correct as of 7 June 2026, after the match against China.

No.	Pos.	Player	Date of birth (age)	Caps	Goals	Club
1	GK	Violetta Isaykina	23 April 2004 (age 22)	2	0	(Russian Football Union) Chertanovo Moscow
12	GK	Natalia Silina	2 August 1999 (age 27)	7	0	(Russian Football Union) Krasnodar
21	GK	Varvara Dudorova	9 May 2005 (age 21)	4	0	(Russian Football Union) Chertanovo Moscow
2	DF	Veronika Kuropatkina	3 September 1999 (age 27)	25	4	(Russian Football Union) Zenit
3	DF	Anna Kozhnikova	10 July 1987 (age 39)	112	13	(Russian Football Union) Spartak Moscow
4	DF	Elizaveta Semenova	18 June 2004 (age 22)	16	0	(Russian Football Union) CSKA Moscow
5	DF	Vladislava Butkevich	12 September 2006 (age 20)	8	1	(Russian Football Union) Lokomotiv Moscow
7	DF	Alsu Abdullina	11 April 2001 (age 25)	57	5	(Russian Football Union) Lokomotiv Moscow
13	DF	Yuliana Kamorina	10 July 2007 (age 19)	1	0	(Russian Football Union) Chertanovo Moscow
15	DF	Natalia Morozova	14 October 1995 (age 31)	20	2	(Russian Football Union) Spartak Moscow
22	DF	Ksenia Oleksyuk	22 March 2003 (age 23)	13	0	(Russian Football Union) Chertanovo Moscow
8	MF	Azaliya Zalmiyeva	11 August 2006 (age 20)	13	2	(Russian Football Union) Lokomotiv Moscow
10	MF	Nadezhda Smirnova	22 February 1996 (age 30)	72	18	(Russian Football Union) CSKA Moscow
11	MF	Marine Achoian	28 September 2002 (age 24)	4	0	(Russian Football Union) CSKA Moscow
14	MF	Tatiana Petrova	23 December 2001 (age 24)	19	2	(Russian Football Union) CSKA Moscow
16	MF	Yana Sheina	23 June 2000 (age 26)	31	1	(Russian Football Union) Lokomotiv Moscow
17	MF	Marina Fedorova	10 May 1997 (age 29)	67	13	(Russian Football Union) Spartak Moscow
18	MF	Polina Yuklyaeva	7 November 2003 (age 23)	16	4	(Russian Football Union) Lokomotiv Moscow
19	MF	Darina Ishmukhametova	3 November 2005 (age 21)	17	4	(Russian Football Union) Zenit
24	MF	Zarina Sharifova	9 January 2004 (age 22)	8	0	(Russian Football Union) Chertanovo Moscow
9	FW	Natalya Mashina	28 March 1997 (age 29)	46	7	(Russian Football Union) Spartak Moscow
20	FW	Kira Petukhova	24 May 2006 (age 20)	12	0	(Russian Football Union) Chertanovo Moscow

=== Recent call ups ===
The following players have also been called up to the squad within the past 12 months.

Pos.	Player	Date of birth (age)	Caps	Goals	Club	Latest call-up
GK	Yulia Grichenko	10 March 1990 (age 36)	36	0	(Russia) Zenit	v. Ghana, 3 March 2026
GK	Diana Ponomaryova	20 August 2006 (age 20)	8	0	(Russia) Dynamo Moscow	v. Ghana, 3 March 2026
GK	Vera Sanzharovskaya	4 December 2005 (age 20)	0	0	(Russia) Krasnodar	v. North Macedonia, 27 October 2025
GK	Arina Taranchenko	20 August 2006 (age 20)	0	0	(Russia) Dynamo Moscow	v. North Macedonia, 27 October 2025
DF	Valentina Smirnova	25 October 2002 (age 24)	20	2	(Russia) Krasnodar	v. Ghana, 3 March 2026
DF	Yulia Pleshkova	15 January 2002 (age 24)	14	0	(Russia) CSKA Moscow	v. Ghana, 3 March 2026
DF	Yana Sholgina	10 April 2003 (age 23)	4	0	(Russia) Rubin	v. Ghana, 3 March 2026
DF	Maria Durnova	13 December 2004 (age 21)	3	1	(Russia) Krylia Sovetov	v. Ghana, 3 March 2026
DF	Valeria Lushnikova	12 February 2006 (age 20)	2	1	(Russia) Lokomotiv Moscow	v. Ghana, 3 March 2026
DF	Vasilisa Lakeeva	30 January 2006 (age 20)	1	0	(Russia) Lokomotiv Moscow	v. Ghana, 3 March 2026
MF	Medea Zharkova	12 July 2003 (age 23)	25	4	(Russia) Zenit	v. Ghana, 3 March 2026
MF	Ksenia Dolgova	14 November 2004 (age 22)	13	1	(Russia) Lokomotiv Moscow	v. Ghana, 3 March 2026
MF	Alina Shkalova	21 March 2005 (age 21)	10	0	(Russia) Chertanovo Moscow	v. Ghana, 3 March 2026
MF	Natalia Trofimova	17 May 2000 (age 26)	6	0	(Russia) Zenit	v. Ghana, 3 March 2026
MF	Ksenia Dzhinikashvili	4 August 1997 (age 29)	5	0	(Russia) Zenit	v. Ghana, 3 March 2026
MF	Diana Kishmakhova	16 October 2003 (age 23)	4	0	(Russia) CSKA Moscow	v. Ghana, 3 March 2026
MF	Kristina Komissarova	24 February 2001 (age 25)	25	1	(Russia) Dynamo Moscow	v. North Korea, 30 November 2025
MF	Yana Svistunova	25 January 2006 (age 20)	7	1	(Russia) Spartak Moscow	v. North Macedonia, 27 October 2025
MF	Anna Solovyova	9 September 2004 (age 22)	0	0	(Russia) Zvezda-2005	v. North Macedonia, 27 October 2025
FW	Tatiana Morina	14 February 2000 (age 26)	7	0	(Russia) Ryazan-VDV	v. Ghana, 3 March 2026
FW	Glafira Zhukova	10 August 2003 (age 23)	5	1	(Russia) Lokomotiv Moscow	v. North Macedonia, 27 October 2025
Notes: ^{INJ} = Withdrew due to injury; ^{RET} = Retired from the national team

=== Previous squads ===
FIFA Women's World Cup

- 1999 FIFA Women's World Cup
- 2003 FIFA Women's World Cup

== Records ==
- Active players in **bold**, statistics correct **as of 2020**.

=== Most capped players ===
#	Player	Year(s)	Caps
**1**	Svetlana Petko	1992–2004	144

=== Top goalscorers ===
#	Player	Year(s)	Goals	Caps
**1**	Natalia Barbashina	1995–2009	46	?

== Competitive record ==
=== FIFA Women's World Cup ===
FIFA Women's World Cup record									Qualification record								
Year	Result	Pld	W	D*	L	GF	GA	GD	Pld	W	D*	L	GF	GA	GD	P/R	Rnk
(China) 1991	Did not enter								UEFA Women's Euro 1991								
(Sweden) 1995	Did not qualify								UEFA Women's Euro 1995								
(United States) 1999	Quarter-finals	4	2	0	2	10	5	+5	8	6	0	2	19	11	+8	–	
(United States) 2003	Quarter-finals	4	2	0	2	6	9	−3	6	3	2	1	10	6	+4	–	
(China) 2007	Did not qualify								8	6	0	2	24	9	+15	–	
(Germany) 2011	Did not qualify								8	6	1	1	30	6	+24	–	
(Canada) 2015	Did not qualify								10	7	1	2	19	18	+1	–	
(France) 2019	Did not qualify								8	4	1	3	16	13	+3	–	
(Australia) (New Zealand) 2023	Disqualified								Disqualified during qualification								
(Brazil) 2027	Banned								Banned								
(Costa Rica) (Jamaica) (Mexico) (United States) 2031	To be determined								To be determined								
(United Kingdom) 2035	To be determined								To be determined								
Total	2/10	8	4	0	4	16	14	+2	48	32	5	11	118	63	+55	–	

*Draws include knockout matches decided on penalty kicks.

FIFA Women's World Cup Match history
Year	Round	Date	Opponent	Result	Stadium
(United States) 1999	Group stage	20 June	Norway	**L** 1–2	Foxboro Stadium, Foxborough
(United States) 1999	Group stage	23 June	Japan	**W** 5–0	Civic Stadium, Portland
(United States) 1999	Group stage	26 June	Canada	**W** 4–1	Giants Stadium, East Rutherford
(United States) 1999	Quarter-finals	30 June	China	**L** 0–2	Spartan Stadium, San Jose
(United States) 2003	Group stage	21 September	Australia	**W** 2–1	The Home Depot Center, Carson
(United States) 2003	Group stage	25 September	Ghana	**W** 3–0	The Home Depot Center, Carson
(United States) 2003	Group stage	28 September	China	**L** 0–1	PGE Park, Portland
(United States) 2003	Quarter-finals	2 October	Germany	**L** 1–7	PGE Park, Portland

=== UEFA Women's Championship ===
UEFA Women's Championship record								Qualifying record							
Year	Result	Pld	W	D*	L	GF	GA	Pld	W	D*	L	GF	GA	P/R	Rnk
1984	Did not exist							Did not exist							
(Norway) 1987	Did not exist							Did not exist							
(West Germany) 1989	Did not exist							Did not exist							
(Denmark) 1991	Did not enter							Did not enter							
(Italy) 1993	Did not qualify							6	3	2	1	7	9	–	
(Germany) 1995	Did not qualify							8	4	2	2	9	9	–	
(Norway) (Sweden) 1997	Group stage	3	0	0	3	2	6	6	3	2	1	10	3	–	
(Germany) 2001	Group stage	3	0	1	2	1	7	6	6	0	0	19	4	–	
(England) 2005	Did not qualify							10	5	2	3	23	12	–	
(Finland) 2009	Group stage	3	0	0	3	2	8	10	7	1	2	29	11	–	
(Sweden) 2013	Group stage	3	0	2	1	3	5	12	8	2	2	34	7	–	
(Netherlands) 2017	Group stage	3	1	0	2	2	5	8	4	2	2	14	9	–	
(England) 2022	Disqualified after qualification							12	9	1	2	24	6	–	
(Switzerland) 2025	Banned							Banned							
Total	5/14	15	1	3	11	10	31	78	49	14	15	169	70	–	

*Draws include knockout matches decided on penalty kicks.

=== Algarve Cup ===
Year	Result	Matches	Wins	Draws	Losses	GF	GA
(Portugal) 1994—1995	Did not enter						
(Portugal) 1996	5th	4	1	1	2	3	6
(Portugal) 1997—2013	Did not enter						
(Portugal) 2014	9th	4	2	0	2	7	6
(Portugal) 2015	Did not enter						
(Portugal) 2016	6th	4	1	1	2	1	8
(Portugal) 2017	8th	4	1	0	3	3	12
(Portugal) 2018	12th	4	0	0	4	2	9
(Portugal) 2019—2022	Did not enter						
Total	5/25	20	5	2	13	16	41

- Albena Cup: won in 1999, 2001, 2004

== See also ==
- Russia women's national football team results
- Russia women's international footballers
- Russia women's national under-19 football team
- Russia women's national under-17 football team
- Russia women's national under-15 football team
- Russia women's national futsal team
- Russia national football team
