= Al Hamriya Sports Club Stadium =

Football stadium in Al Hamriyah, United Arab Emirates

- Interactive map of Al Hamriya Sports Club Stadium
- Location: Al Hamriyah, United Arab Emirates
- Coordinates: 25.48096°N 55.51471°E
- Owner: Al Hamriyah SC
- Operator: Al Hamriyah SC
- Capacity: 5,000
- Surface: Grass

The Al Hamriya Sports Club Stadium is an association football stadium in Al Hamriyah, United Arab Emirates, with a capacity of 5,000. It's primarily used by Al Hamriyah SC.

== International association football ==
The stadium has hosted several national team friendly matches in men's and women's football.

Date	Competition	Home	Score	Away
22/12/2014	Friendly	Iraq	1-1	Kuwait
23/02/2020	Friendly	Uzbekistan	0-1	Belarus
11/11/2021	Friendly	Kyrgyzstan	2-1	Singapore
15/11/2022	Friendly	Venezuela	2-2	Panama
17/10/2023	Friendly	Zambia	3-0	Uganda
20/02/2025	Friendly (Women's teams)	South Korea	3-0	Uzbekistan
20/02/2025	Friendly (Women's teams)	Jordan	0-2	India
20/02/2025	Friendly (Women's teams)	Russia	3-1	Thailand
23/02/2025	Friendly (Women's teams)	Uzbekistan	1-0	Jordan
23/02/2025	Friendly (Women's teams)	South Korea	4-0	Thailand
23/02/2025	Friendly (Women's teams)	Russia	2-0	India
26/02/2025	Friendly (Women's teams)	India	0-3	South Korea
26/02/2025	Friendly (Women's teams)	Uzbekistan	0-0	Thailand
26/02/2025	Friendly (Women's teams)	Russia	3-0	Jordan
