= Al Hamriyah =

- Location within United Arab Emirates
- Coordinates: 25°28′51″N 55°29′54″E
- Country: United Arab Emirates
- Emirate: Sharjah
- Elevation: 0 m (0 ft)

Population (2022-12-31)Estimate
  - Total: 19,000

Al Hamriyah is one of nine municipalities

Al Hamriyah is a coastal settlement of Sharjah on the northern perimeter of the United Arab Emirates. It is one of nine municipalities of the emirate, and is wedged between the emirates of Ajman (south) and Umm Al Qawain (north). It is notable for its lagoon popular with pleasure boaters and jet skiers as well as local fishermen who moor here, as well as store and repaire both rope and wire mesh fishing nets.

The village is not to be confused with the Hamriyah Port and Free Zone, which lie immediately to the south of it.

It has traditionally been home to families belonging to the Darawishah section of the Al Bu Shamis Na'im, linked through this relationship to the area of Sharjah bounding immediately to the south of Ajman, Al Heera. These would be associated with the modern Emirati family name Alshamsi.

== History ==
Going un-noted in early 19th-century British coastal surveys, Al Hamriyah struggled for independence in the late 19th century as a result of alleged negligence by the rulers of Sharjah, which held suzerainty over Al Hamriyah, in protecting the pearling families of the town from absconding debtors - a duty of the ruler who imposed a wali over Al Hamriyah.

In 1855, a blood-feud broke out in Sharjah between members of the Huwalah and Shwaihiyin tribes in Sharjah and Sultan bin Saqr Al Qasimi moved the Shwaihiyin, a body of recent immigrants to Sharjah who numbered some 500 fighting men, to Hamriyah, a town on the northern border between Ajman and Sharjah. This provoked the first of what would be many rebellions by Hamriyah against Al Qasimi rule, which Sultan put down by besieging Hamriyah in May 1855 with a force of his own men as well as some 3,000 from Ajman and five artillery pieces. Hamriyah was defended by some 800 men and Abdullah bin Sultan was killed in the fighting.

With only ten men lost by the defenders of Hamriyah (and some 60 dead among the besiegers), the British were brought in by Sultan to mediate. It had been Sultan's hope that the captain of the British ship Clive, Kemball, would enforce his writ over Hamriyah, but Kemball refused to attack Hamriyah on Sultan's behalf and instead negotiated a peace between which saw the Shwaihiyin removed from the town. In 1860, the headman of Hamriyah, Abdulrahman bin Saif Alshamsi, led a force in support of Sharjah against the rebellious communities of Khan and Abu Hail.

In 1873, the headman of Hamriyah, Saif bin Abdulrahman Alshamsi, led a confederation of smaller Sheikhs against Sharjah. By 1875 he had played a role as mediator between the Ruler and the other Sheikhs (likely of Heera, Khan and Abu Hail) and proclaimed the independence of Hamriyah once again.

Hamriya was once again to prove a thorn in the side of Sharjah's ruler when Saqr bin Khalid Al Qasimi came to power through a coup at the end of March 1883, and he used the chance to assert his rule over the town when Mohammed bin Abdulrahman, the brother of Hamriyah’s headman, Saif bin Abdulrahman, seemed as if he might recognise Saqr as ruler. In April 1884, Saqr asked Saif bin Abdulrahman to come and meet him in Sharjah. Once Saif had left Hamriyah, Saqr sent Mohammed to rule Hamriyah in Saif ’s place and as wali in Saqr’s name. The plan failed when Saif bin Abdulrahman returned to Hamriyah and simply threw his brother out.

=== 20th Century ===
Although it was never formally recognised by the British as a Trucial emirate (it came close in 1903, the British only failing to recognise Hamriyah's headman Saif bin Abdulrahman as a Trucial Sheikh out of deference to Sharjah's ruler, Saqr bin Ahmad Al Qasimi), Hamriyah was granted its independence by the Ruler of Sharjah, Sheikh Khalid bin Ahmad Al Qasimi, on 9 August 1923. Khalid bin Ahmad's letter of that date granting independence to Sheikh Abdulrahman bin Saif of Hamriyah renounced all claims by Sharjah to taxes or revenues from Hamriyah.

Sheikh Khalid bin Ahmad Al Qasimi of Sharjah was deposed the next year and his successor, Sheikh Sultan bin Saqr Al Qasimi, did not honour his undertaking to Hamriyah. The British, however, were minded to recognise Hamriyah as an emirate and were only stopped from so doing by the death of Sheikh Abdulrahman bin Saif Alshamsi by the hand of his nephew, Saif bin Abdullah Alshamsi, in April 1931. A period of coup and counter-coup followed (eventually ending in the accession of Sheikh Abdulrahman bin Saif's son, Humaid bin Abdulrahman) and although independence for Hamriyah was discussed again in 1937 when oil concessions were being negotiated throughout the Trucial States, it came to nothing and Hamriyah remained part of Sharjah.
