= Vladimir Bartasevich =

Russian football defender

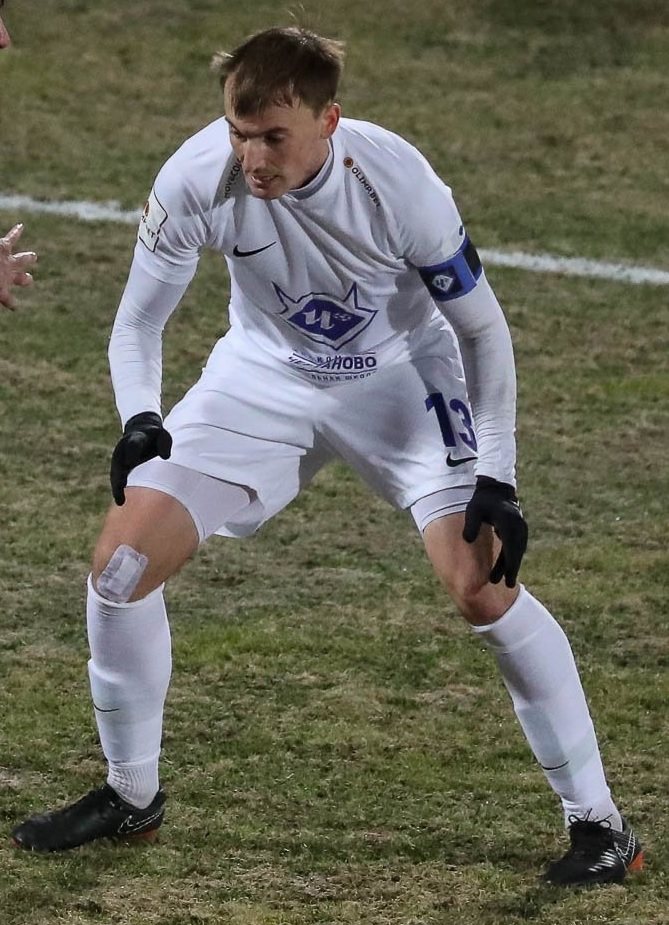
- Bartasevich with Chertanovo in 2021

Personal information
- Full name: Vladimir Yuryevich Bartasevich
- Date of birth: 28 July 1993 (age 33)
- Place of birth: Novy Buyan, Russia
- Height: 1.80 m (5 ft 11 in)
- Position: Defender

Team information
- Current team: FC Chertanovo Moscow
- Number: 13

Youth career
- Chertanovo Education Center

Senior career*
Years	Team	Apps	(Gls)
2010–2012	FC Chertanovo Moscow (amateur)		
2012–2014	FC Oktan Perm	48	(0)
2014–	FC Chertanovo Moscow	309	(7)
- * Club domestic league appearances and goals as of 1 November 2026

Vladimir Yuryevich Bartasevich (Russian: Владимир Юрьевич Бартасевич; born 28 July 1993) is a Russian football defender who plays for FC Chertanovo Moscow in Russian Second League.

== Club career ==
He made his debut in the Russian Second Division for FC Oktan Perm on 21 July 2012 in a game against FC Tyumen. His first FNL game against FC Rotor Volgograd on 17 July 2018 was also the debut of Chertanovo in Russian First Division.
