= 2007–08 Ligat Nashim =

Ligat Nashim
- Season: 2007–08
- Matches: 132
- Goals: 664 (5.03 per match)
- Top goalscorer: Shirley Ohana (55)

The 2007–08 Ligat Nashim was the tenth season of women's league football under the Israeli Football Association.

As all 5 members of the previous season's second division folded, the league was contested as a single division.

The league was won by Maccabi Holon, its fifth consecutive title. By winning, Maccabi Holon qualified to 2008–09 UEFA Women's Cup.

== League table ==
Pos	Team	Pld	W	D	L	GF	GA	GD	Pts	Qualification
1	Maccabi Holon	22	21	0	1	139	6	+133	63	Qualified to UEFA Women's Cup
2	ASA Tel Aviv University	22	20	1	1	107	8	+99	61	
3	Maccabi Kishronot Hadera	22	16	2	4	67	30	+37	50	
4	Hapoel Be'er Sheva	22	12	2	8	70	48	+22	38	
5	F.C. Ramat HaSharon	22	8	5	9	54	35	+19	29	
6	Maccabi Tzur Shalom Bialik	22	9	2	11	35	49	−14	29	
7	Hapoel Ironi Petah Tikva	22	8	4	10	36	38	−2	28	
8	Maccabi Be'er Sheva	22	8	3	11	50	57	−7	27	
9	Bnot Caesarea Tiv'on	22	6	4	12	38	58	−20	22	
10	Bnot Sakhnin	22	6	4	12	33	75	−42	22	
11	Hapoel Rishon LeZion	22	3	3	16	28	84	−56	12	
12	Hapoel Marmorek	22	0	0	22	7	176	−169	0	

== Top scorers ==
Rank	Scorer	Club	Goals
1	Shirley Ohana	Maccabi Holon	55
2	Adva Twil	ASA Tel Aviv University	25
2	Adi Yahas	Hapoel Be'er Sheva	25
4	Meital Dayan	ASA Tel Aviv University	22
4	Karin Peretz	Hapoel Be'er Sheva	22
6	Dovrat Bendel	ASA Tel Aviv University	21
7	Or Erez	Maccabi Holon	20
8	Daniel Sofer	Maccabi Kishronot Hadera	19
9	Rim Mussa	Maccabi Kishronot Hadera	16
9	Sheli Israel	ASA Tel Aviv University	16
