= 2015–16 in Israeli football =

68th season of competitive football in Israel

Football in Israel
- Season: 2015–16

Men's football
- Israeli Premier League: Hapoel Be'er Sheva
- Liga Leumit: F.C. Ashdod
- State Cup: Maccabi Haifa
- Toto Cup Al: Maccabi Petah Tikva
- Super Cup: Ironi Kiryat Shmona

The 2015–16 season was the 68th season of competitive football in Israel, and the 90th season under the Israeli Football Association, established in 1928, during the British Mandate.

The season saw Hapoel Be'er Sheva winning league, its first championship title since 1976 and Maccabi Haifa winning its first Israel State Cup in 18 years. In women's football, F.C. Ramat HaSharon won its first ever league title, the first since 2002 which was not won by either Maccabi Holon or ASA Tel Aviv University. F.C. Kiryat Gat won the Israeli Women's Cup, its first ever major title.

== IFA Competitions ==
=== League Competitions ===
==== Men's senior competitions ====
Competition		Winner/Promotion	Relegated	Top Scorer
Israeli Premier League		Hapoel Be'er Sheva	Hapoel Acre; Maccabi Netanya	Eran Zahavi (35)
Liga Leumit		F.C. Ashdod; Hapoel Ashkelon	Maccabi Yavne; Maccabi Kiryat Gat	Jordan Faucher (21)
Liga Alef	North	Ironi Nesher	Maccabi Sektzia Ma'alot-Tarshiha; Ihud Bnei Majd al-Krum	Assi Goma (17)
Liga Alef	South	Maccabi Sha'arayim	Maccabi Amishav Petah Tikva; Bnei Eilat; Hapoel Morasha Ramat HaSharon	Elad Cohen (14); Nir Sharon
Liga Bet	North A	Tzeirei Kafr Kanna	Ahi Bir al-Maksur; Hapoel Bnei Maghar	Radi Mohana (18)
Liga Bet	North B	Hapoel Robi Shapira Haifa	Ihud Bnei Baqa; F.C. Pardes Hanna-Karkur	Mizr Zoabi (22)
Liga Bet	South A	F.C. Bnei Jaffa Ortodoxim; F.C. Tira	Hapoel Tzafririm Holon; Ironi Beit Dagan	Shai Rotman (17)
Liga Bet	South B	F.C. Dimona	Hapoel Merhavim; Hapoel Rahat	David Peles (22)
Liga Gimel	Upper Galilee	F.C. Julis		As'ad Amasha (29)
Liga Gimel	Lower Galilee	Maccabi Tzeirei Shefa-'Amr		Mohammad Bushnak (26)
Liga Gimel	Jezreel	Hapoel Bnei Ar'ara 'Ara		Amir Rohana (23); Qasim Loabna
Liga Gimel	Samaria	Hapoel Tirat HaCarmel		Sagi Pichadze (26)
Liga Gimel	Sharon	Hapoel Ihud Bnei Jatt		Islam Khatib (28)
Liga Gimel	Tel Aviv	Shimshon Tel Aviv		Almog Samet Cohen (36)
Liga Gimel	Center	Nordia Jerusalem		Elad Avramson (31)
Liga Gimel	South	Maccabi Ashdod		Ariel Trabelsi (32)

==== Women's senior competitions ====
Competition	Winner	Relegated	Top Scorer
Ligat Nashim Rishona	F.C. Ramat HaSharon	Maccabi Be'er Sheva	Tiffany Cameron (35)
Ligat Nashim Shniya	Bnot Netanya		Hadar Shem Tov (16); Shaked Elimelech

==== Youth competitions ====
Competition	Winner	Runners-up	Top Scorer
Noar Premier (U-19)	Maccabi Haifa	Maccabi Tel Aviv	Mohammad Awad
Ne'arim A (U-18)	Maccabi Tel Aviv	Hapoel Tel Aviv	Ron Ben Basat
Ne'arim B (U-17)	Maccabi Haifa	Maccabi Tel Aviv	Shadi Masarwa
Ne'arot (women's U-19)	Hapoel Petah Tikva	Bnot Sakhnin	Do'aa Said Ahmad

=== Cup Competitions ===
Competition		Winner	Runner-up
State Cup		Maccabi Haifa	Maccabi Tel Aviv
Super Cup		Ironi Kiryat Shmona	Maccabi Tel Aviv
Toto Cup	Al	Maccabi Petah Tikva	Ironi Kiryat Shmona
Toto Cup	Leumit	Hapoel Ashkeon	F.C. Ashdod
Israeli Women's Cup		F.C. Kiryat Gat	ASA Tel Aviv University
Israel Youth State Cup		Hapoel Petah Tikva	Hapoel Tel Aviv

== International Club Competitions ==
=== Champions League ===
==== Second qualifying round ====
Team 1	Agg.	Team 2	1st leg	2nd leg
Hibernians (Malta)	3–6	(Israel) Maccabi Tel Aviv	2–1	1–5

==== Third qualifying round ====
Team 1	Agg.	Team 2	1st leg	2nd leg
Maccabi Tel Aviv (Israel)	3–2	(Czech Republic) Viktoria Plzeň	1–2	2–0

==== Play-off round ====
Team 1	Agg.	Team 2	1st leg	2nd leg
Basel (Switzerland)	3–3 (a)	(Israel) Maccabi Tel Aviv	2–2	1–1

==== Group stage (Group G) ====
Pos	Team	Pld	W	D	L	GF	GA	GD	Pts	Qualification	CHE	DKV	POR	MTA
1	(England) Chelsea	6	4	1	1	13	3	+10	13	Advance to knockout phase	—	2–1	2–0	4–0
2	(Ukraine) Dynamo Kyiv	6	3	2	1	8	4	+4	11	Advance to knockout phase	0–0	—	2–2	1–0
3	(Portugal) Porto	6	3	1	2	9	8	+1	10	Transfer to Europa League	2–1	0–2	—	2–0
4	(Israel) Maccabi Tel Aviv	6	0	0	6	1	16	−15	0		0–4	0–2	1–3	—

Source: UEFA

=== Europa League ===
==== First qualifying round ====
Team 1	Agg.	Team 2	1st leg	2nd leg
Ordabasy (Kazakhstan)	1–2	(Israel) Beitar Jerusalem	0–0	1–2

==== Second qualifying round ====
Team 1	Agg.	Team 2	1st leg	2nd leg
Hapoel Be'er Sheva (Israel)	2–3	(Switzerland) Thun	1–1	1–2
Charleroi (Belgium)	9–2	(Israel) Beitar Jerusalem	5–1	4–1

==== Third qualifying round ====
Team 1	Agg.	Team 2	1st leg	2nd leg
Slovan Liberec (Czech Republic)	5–1	(Israel) Ironi Kiryat Shmona	2–1	3–0

=== Women's Champions League ===
==== Qualifying round (Group 4) ====
Pos	Team	Pld	W	D	L	GF	GA	GD	Pts	Qualification
1	(Netherlands) Twente (H)	3	3	0	0	19	0	+19	9	Advanced to knockout phase
2	(Hungary) Ferencváros	3	2	0	1	13	3	+10	6	
3	(Israel) ASA Tel Aviv	3	1	0	2	6	10	−4	3	
4	(Luxembourg) Jeunesse Junglinster	3	0	0	3	1	26	−25	0	

Source: UEFA
(H) Hosts

=== 2015–16 UEFA Youth League ===
==== Champions League Path group stage ====
Pos	Team	Pld	W	D	L	GF	GA	GD	Pts	Qualification	CHE	DKV	POR	MTA
1	(England) Chelsea	6	4	2	0	15	4	+11	14	Advance to round of 16	—	3–1	0–0	3–0
2	(Ukraine) Dynamo Kyiv	6	3	1	2	7	7	0	10	Advance to play-offs	0–2	—	2–1	2–0
3	(Portugal) Porto	6	2	2	2	8	7	+1	8		3–3	0–1	—	2–0
4	(Israel) Maccabi Tel Aviv	6	0	1	5	2	14	−12	1		0–4	1–1	1–2	—

Source: UEFA

== National Teams ==
=== National team ===
==== Euro 2016 Qualifying (Group B) ====
Pos	Team	Pld	W	D	L	GF	GA	GD	Pts	Qualification
1	Belgium	10	7	2	1	24	5	+19	23	Qualify for final tournament
2	Wales	10	6	3	1	11	4	+7	21	Qualify for final tournament
3	Bosnia and Herzegovina	10	5	2	3	17	12	+5	17	Advance to play-offs
4	Israel	10	4	1	5	16	14	+2	13	
5	Cyprus	10	4	0	6	16	17	−1	12	
6	Andorra	10	0	0	10	4	36	−32	0	

Source: UEFA
Rules for classification: Qualification tiebreakers

==== 2015–16 matches ====
Date	Competition	Opponent	Venue	Result	Scorers
3 September 2015	Euro 2016 Qual.	Andorra	Sammy Ofer Stadium, Haifa	4–0	Eran Zahavi, Nir Bitton, Tomer Hemed, Mu'nas Dabbur
9 September 2015	Euro 2016 Qual.	Wales	Cardiff City Stadium, Cardiff	0–0	
10 October 2015	Euro 2016 Qual.	Cyprus	Teddy Stadium, Jerusalem	1–2	Nir Bitton
13 October 2015	Euro 2016 Qual.	Belgium	King Baudouin Stadium, Brussels	1–3	Tomer Hemed
23 March 2016	Friendly	Croatia	Stadion Gradski vrt, Osijek	0–2	
31 May 2016	Friendly	Serbia	Stadion Karađorđe, Novi Sad	1–3	Eran Zahavi

=== Women's National Team ===
==== 2017 Women's Euro qualification (group 8) ====
Pos	Team	Pld	W	D	L	GF	GA	GD	Pts	Qualification
1	Norway	8	7	1	0	29	2	+27	22	Final tournament
2	Austria	8	5	2	1	18	4	+14	17	Final tournament
3	Wales	8	3	2	3	13	11	+2	11	
4	Kazakhstan	8	1	1	6	2	30	−28	4	
5	Israel	8	0	2	6	2	17	−15	2	

Source: UEFA
Rules for classification: Qualification tiebreakers

==== Aphrodite Cup, Cyprus ====
Pos	Team	Pld	W	D	L	GF	GA	GD	Pts
1	Israel	4	3	1	0	6	1	+5	10
2	Cyprus	4	3	0	1	5	2	+3	9
3	Malta	4	1	1	2	6	7	−1	4
4	Estonia	4	1	0	3	6	5	+1	3
5	Lithuania	4	1	0	3	4	10	−6	3

Updated to match(es) played on 16 March 2016. Source: IFA

==== 2015–16 matches ====
Date	Competition	Opponent	Venue	Result	Scorers
22 October 2015	2017 Women's Euro qual.	Kazakhstan	Municipal Stadium, Lod	0–0	
25 October 2015	2017 Women's Euro qual.	Austria	Municipal Stadium, Lod	0–1	
1 December 2015	2017 Women's Euro qual.	Wales	Ramat Gan Stadium, Ramat Gan	2–2	Lee Falkon, Shelly Israel
21 January 2016	Friendly	Ukraine	Ramat Gan Stadium, Ramat Gan	0–0	
23 January 2016	Friendly	Ukraine	National Team Complex, Shefayim	1–3	Daniel Sofer
10 March 2016	Aphrodite Cup	Malta	Parekklisias Stadium, Parekklisia	1–1	Danielle Schulmann
13 March 2016	Aphrodite Cup	Lithuania	Parekklisias Stadium, Parekklisia	2–0	Danielle Schulmann, Arava Shahaf
15 March 2016	Aphrodite Cup	Estonia	Koinotiko Stadio, Parekklisia	2–0	Lee Falkon, Danielle Schulmann
16 March 2016	Aphrodite Cup	Cyprus	Koinotiko Stadio, Parekklisia	1–0	Shay Sade
6 April 2016	2017 Women's Euro qual.	Norway	Ramat Gan Stadium, Ramat Gan	0–1	
2 June 2016	2017 Women's Euro qual.	Kazakhstan	Futbol Ortaligi BIIK Main Field, Shymkent	0–1	
6 June 2016	2017 Women's Euro qual.	Austria	Waldviertler Volksbank Arena, Horn	0–4	

=== U-21 National team ===
==== 2017 European U-21 qualifying round (Group 4) ====
Pos	Team	Pld	W	D	L	GF	GA	GD	Pts	Qualification	Portugal	Israel	Greece	Albania	Hungary	Liechtenstein
1	Portugal	10	8	2	0	34	5	+29	26	Final tournament	—	0–0	1–0	4–0	2–0	4–0
2	Israel	10	6	3	1	21	4	+17	21		0–3	—	4–0	4–0	3–0	4–0
3	Greece	10	4	1	5	13	14	−1	13		0–4	0–1	—	2–1	3–1	5–0
4	Albania	10	3	3	4	11	20	−9	12		1–6	1–1	0–0	—	2–1	2–0
5	Hungary	10	3	3	4	19	16	+3	12		3–3	0–0	2–1	2–2	—	4–0
6	Liechtenstein	10	0	0	10	1	40	−39	0		1–7	0–4	0–2	0–2	0–6	—

Source: UEFA
Rules for classification: Qualification tiebreakers

==== 2015–16 matches ====
Date	Competition	Opponent	Venue	Result	Scorers
3 September 2015	2017 U-21 Euro qual.	Albania	Qemal Stafa Stadium, Tirana	1–1	Dor Hugi
8 October 2015	Friendly	Poland	Arena Lublin, Lublin	1–3	Ataa Jaber
12 November 2015	2017 U-21 Euro qual.	Hungary	HaMoshava Stadium, Petah Tikva	3–0	Dean David, Shoval Gozlan, Michael Ohana
17 November 2015	2017 U-21 Euro qual.	Portugal	HaMoshava Stadium, Petah Tikva	0–3	
24 March 2016	2017 U-21 Euro qual.	Hungary	Ménfői út, Győr	0–0	
28 March 2016	2017 U-21 Euro qual.	Greece	Peristeri Stadium, Peristeri	1–0	Shoval Gozlan
31 May 2016	Lobanovskyi Tournament	Ukraine	Obolon Arena, Kyiv	1–1 (5–4 p)	Shoval Gozlan
2 June 2016	Lobanovskyi Tournament	Serbia	Bannikov Stadium, Kyiv	3–2	Dor Hugi, Michael Ohana, Maxim Plakuschenko

=== U-19 National team ===
==== 2016 UEFA European Under-19 Championship qualification ====
===== Qualifying round =====
Pos	Team	Pld	W	D	L	GF	GA	GD	Pts	Qualification
1	Israel	3	2	1	0	7	2	+5	7	Elite round
2	Denmark	3	1	2	0	4	1	+3	5	Elite round
3	Iceland	3	1	1	1	3	5	−2	4	
4	Malta (H)	3	0	0	3	1	7	−6	0	

Source: UEFA
Rules for classification: Qualification tiebreakers
(H) Hosts

===== Elite round =====
Pos	Team	Pld	W	D	L	GF	GA	GD	Pts	Qualification
1	Italy (H)	3	2	1	0	8	2	+6	7	Final tournament
2	Turkey	3	2	1	0	7	3	+4	7	
3	Israel	3	1	0	2	2	5	−3	3	
4	Switzerland	3	0	0	3	1	8	−7	0	

Source: UEFA
Rules for classification: Qualification tiebreakers
(H) Hosts

==== 2015–16 matches ====
Date	Competition	Opponent	Venue	Result	Scorers
3 August 2015	Friendly	Armenia	National Team Complex, Shefayim	4–0	Raz Itzhak (2), Idan Nahmias, Ibrahim Sfuri
5 August 2015	Friendly	Armenia	National Team Complex, Shefayim	3–3	Raz Itzhak (2), Noam Gamon
3 September 2015	Tournament Cele	Montenegro	Gradski Stadion, Subotica	0–1	
4 September 2015	Tournament Cele	Ukraine	Gradski Stadion, Bačka Topola	0–2	
6 September 2015	Tournament Cele	United States	Gradski Stadion, Bačka Topola	0–2	
12 October 2015	Friendly	Cyprus	National Team Complex, Shefayim	3–1	Raz Itzhak (2), Anas Mahamid
14 October 2015	Friendly	Cyprus	National Team Complex, Shefayim	0–0	
10 November 2015	2016 U-19 Euro qual. round	Malta	Victor Tedesco Stadium, Ħamrun	3–1	Anas Mahamid (2), Ibrahim Sfuri
12 November 2015	2016 U-19 Euro qual. round	Iceland	Victor Tedesco Stadium, Ħamrun	4–1	Anas Mahamid (3), Eylon Yerushalmi
15 November 2015	2016 U-19 Euro qual. round	Denmark	Victor Tedesco Stadium, Ħamrun	0–0	
15 February 2016	Friendly	Romania	Afula Illit Stadium, Afula	1–0	Eden Hershkovitz
14 October 2015	Friendly	Romania	National Team Complex, Shefayim	1–1	Ibrahim Sfuri
25 March 2016	2016 U-19 Euro elite round	Italy	Stadio Euganeo, Padua	0–4	
27 March 2016	2016 U-19 elite round	Turkey	Stadio Romeo Menti, Vicenza	0–1	
30 March 2016	2016 U-19 Euro elite round	Switzerland	Stadio Euganeo, Padua	2–0	Dor Galili, Own goal

=== U-18 National team ===
==== Winter U-18 Tournament, Israel ====
Pos	Team	Pld	W	D	L	GF	GA	GD	Pts
1	Germany	3	2	0	1	8	4	+4	6
2	Ukraine	3	2	0	1	3	2	+1	6
3	Israel	3	1	0	2	3	4	−1	3
4	Serbia	3	1	0	2	3	7	−4	3

Updated to match(es) played on 16 March 2016. Source: IFA

==== 2015–16 matches ====
Date	Competition	Opponent	Venue	Result	Scorers
14 December 2015	Winter tournament	Serbia	Ramat Gan Stadium, Ramat Gan	0–1	
15 December 2015	Winter tournament	Germany	Ramat Gan Stadium, Ramat Gan	3–2	Fadi Najjar, Anas Mahamid, Gal Aviv
17 December 2015	Winter tournament	Ukraine	Ramat Gan Stadium, Ramat Gan	0–1	
11 April 2016	Friendly	Armenia	Yerevan Football Academy Stadium, Yerevan	2–0	Gal Katabi, Mohammad Abu Fani
13 April 2016	Friendly	Armenia	Yerevan Football Academy Stadium, Yerevan	1–1	Anas Mahamid

=== U-19 Women's National team ===
==== 2016 UEFA Women's Under-19 Championship qualification ====
===== Qualifying round (group 8) =====
Pos	Team	Pld	W	D	L	GF	GA	GD	Pts	Qualification
1	Norway	3	2	1	0	15	2	+13	7	Elite round
2	Portugal (H)	3	2	1	0	8	3	+5	7	Elite round
3	Israel	3	0	1	2	3	11	−8	1	
4	Estonia	3	0	1	2	2	12	−10	1	

Source: UEFA
Rules for classification: Qualification tiebreakers
(H) Hosts

==== 2015–16 matches ====
Date	Competition	Opponent	Venue	Result	Scorers
15 September 2015	2016 U-19 Women's Euro qual. round	Portugal	Estádio Municipal Serra da Esgalhada, Fornos de Algodres	1–2	Opal Sofer
17 September 2015	2016 U-19 Women's Euro qual. round	Norway	Estádio Municipal da Guarda, Guarda	0–7	
20 September 2015	2016 U-19 Women's Euro qual. round	Estonia	Estádio Municipal Serra da Esgalhada, Fornos de Algodres	2–2	Maia Cabrera, Eden Avital

- In addition to these matches, the national team competed in the Women's League, finishing 6th, with 11 victories, 2 draws and 9 losses, scoring 78 goals and conceding 28 goals.

=== U-17 National team ===
==== 2016 UEFA European Under-17 Championship qualification ====
===== Qualifying round (group 11) =====
Pos	Team	Pld	W	D	L	GF	GA	GD	Pts	Qualification
1	France	3	3	0	0	5	0	+5	9	Elite round
2	Israel (H)	3	2	0	1	5	5	0	6	Elite round
3	Northern Ireland	3	0	1	2	2	4	−2	1	
4	Norway	3	0	1	2	2	5	−3	1	

Source: UEFA
Rules for classification: Qualification tiebreakers
(H) Hosts

===== Elite round (group 8) =====
Pos	Team	Pld	W	D	L	GF	GA	GD	Pts	Qualification
1	Belgium (H)	3	1	2	0	1	0	+1	5 (Note: Tie broken by penalty shoot-out, as they were playing each other in the last round of matches.)	Final tournament
2	Spain	3	1	2	0	1	0	+1	5	Final tournament
3	Slovenia	3	0	3	0	1	1	0	3	
4	Israel	3	0	1	2	1	3	−2	1	

Source: UEFA
Rules for classification: Qualification tiebreakers
(H) Hosts

==== 2015–16 matches ====
Date	Competition	Opponent	Venue	Result	Scorers
17 August 2015	Friendly	Moldova	National Team Complex, Shefayim	2–0	Raz Shlomo, Eylon Almog
19 August 2015	Friendly	Moldova	National Team Complex, Shefayim	4–0	Eylon Almog, Dan Gross, Haim Yagil Ohana, Avi Butbul
9 September 2015	Four Nations, Germany	Netherlands	Bremen	2–1	Eylon Almog, Avi Butbul
11 September 2015	Four Nations, Germany	Germany	BSA Obervieland, Bremen	0–6	
13 September 2015	Four Nations, Germany	Italy	Bremen	0–1	
20 October 2015	2016 U-17 Euro qual. round	Norway	HaMoshava Stadium, Petah Tikva	3–1	Eylon Almog (2), Muhamad Sarsur
22 October 2015	2016 U-17 Euro qual. round	France	HaMoshava Stadium, Petah Tikva	0–3	
25 October 2015	2016 U-17 Euro qual. round	Northern Ireland	HaMoshava Stadium, Petah Tikva	2–1	Eylon Almog, Ofek Nadir
17 January 2016	Development Cup 2016	Lithuania	Minsk	2–2	Yarin Sharabi, Muhamad Sarsur
19 January 2016	Development Cup 2016	Armenia	Minsk	1–0	Manor Solomon
20 January 2016	Development Cup 2016	Russia	Minsk	2–0	Eylon Almong, Yarin Sharabi
22 January 2016	Development Cup 2016	Belarus	Minsk	2–3	Yarin Sharabi, Avi Butbul
23 January 2016	Development Cup 2016	Ukraine	Minsk	0–3	
11 March 2016	2016 U-17 Euro elite round	Spain	Belgian Football Center, Tubize	0–1	
13 March 2016	2016 U-17 Euro elite round	Belgium	Begijnhofstadion, Overijse	0–1	
16 March 2016	2016 U-17 Euro elite round	Slovenia	Belgian Football Center, Tubize	1–0	Neil Goldberg

=== U-17 Women's National team ===
==== 2015 European U-17 qualifying round (Group 7) ====
Pos	Team	Pld	W	D	L	GF	GA	GD	Pts	Qualification
1	Denmark	3	3	0	0	9	0	+9	9	Elite round
2	Hungary (H)	3	2	0	1	5	2	+3	6	Elite round
3	Wales	3	1	0	2	5	5	0	3	
4	Israel	3	0	0	3	0	12	−12	0	

Source: UEFA
Rules for classification: Qualification tiebreakers
(H) Hosts

==== 2015–16 results ====
Date	Competition	Opponent	Venue	Result	Scorers
10 October 2015	2016 U-17 Women's Euro qual. round	Denmark	Király Sportlétesítmény, Szombathely	0–5	
12 October 2015	2016 U-17 Women's Euro qual. round	Hungary	Sportcentrum Bük, Bük	0–3	
15 October 2015	2016 U-17 Women's Euro qual. round	Wales	Sportcentrum Bük, Bük	0–4	

=== U-16 National team ===
==== 2015–16 matches ====
Date	Competition	Opponent	Venue	Result	Scorers
26 October 2015	Valentin Ivanov Tournament	Moldova	Sputnik-Sport Center, Sochi	1–0	Gil Rahimi
28 October 2015	Valentin Ivanov Tournament	Belarus	Sputnik-Sport Center, Sochi	3–2	Sahar Sa'adon Brami (2), Tomer Hazan
30 October 2015	Valentin Ivanov Tournament	Russia	Central Stadium, Sochi	1–0	Sahar Sa'adon Brami
8 February 2016	Friendly	Russia	National Team Complex, Shefayim	0–0	
9 February 2016	Friendly	Russia	National Team Complex, Shefayim	1–1	Yoni Sisay
9 March 2016	Development Tournament	Serbia	National Training Center, Stara Pazova	1–1 (3–5 p)	Gil Rahimi
11 March 2016	Development Tournament	Moldova	National Training Center, Stara Pazova	2–0	Sahar Sa'adon Brami, Guy Dahan
13 March 2016	Development Tournament	Serbia	National Training Center, Stara Pazova	1–1 (6–4 p)	Sahar Sa'adon Brami
11 May 2016	Bannikov Tournament	Serbia	V. Melnyk Stadium, Obukhiv	2–0	Eden Kartsev, Guy Dahan
12 May 2016	Bannikov Tournament	Ukraine	Bannikov Stadium, Kyiv	1–2	Eden Kartsev
14 May 2016	Bannikov Tournament	Bulgaria	Bannikov Stadium, Kyiv	3–0	Yoni Sisay, Ilay Hen, Sahar Sa'adon Brami
15 September 2016	Bannikov Tournament	Georgia	Bannikov Stadium, Kyiv	2–4	Sahar Sa'adon Brami, Ilay Hen

=== U-16 Women's National team ===
==== 2015–16 results ====
Date	Competition	Opponent	Venue	Result	Scorers
15 March 2016	Development Tournament	Serbia	National Training Center, Stara Pazova	1–4	Shira Elinav
17 March 2016	Development Tournament	Moldova	National Training Center, Stara Pazova	4–0	Lior Edri (2), Shira Elinav (2)
19 March 2016	Development Tournament	Montenegro	National Training Center, Stara Pazova	6–0	Shira Elinav (3), Nelly Haj, Meital Sharabi, Lior Edri
