= 2018–19 Ligat Nashim =

21st season of women's league football under the Israeli Football Association

Israeli Women's Premier League
- Season: 2018–19

The 2018–19 Ligat Nashim was the 21st season of women's league football under the Israeli Football Association.

The defending champions were F.C. Kiryat Gat, having won back to back championships in 2016–17 and 2017–18.

== Premier League ==
Location of the teams in the 2018-19 Ligat Nashim
Yellow: Premier League; Blue: Liga Leumit; Red: One team in either league;

Pos	Team	Pld	W	D	L	GF	GA	GD	Pts	Qualification or relegation (Note: Teams play each other two times (16 rounds) before the league is split into two groups (the top five and the bottom four).)
1	ASA Tel Aviv University	24	17	6	1	64	16	+48	57	Qualification for the Champions League
2	F.C. Kiryat Gat	24	16	6	2	64	19	+45	54	
3	Maccabi Kishronot Hadera	24	10	7	7	35	29	+6	37	
4	Maccabi Holon	24	10	3	11	41	35	+6	33	
5	F.C. Ramat HaSharon	24	8	4	12	36	57	−21	28	
6	Hapoel Ra'anana	22	6	6	10	20	30	−10	24	
7	Bnot Netanya	22	7	1	14	27	59	−32	22	
8	Hapoel Be'er Sheva	22	6	4	12	29	39	−10	22	Relegation play-offs
9	Youth Academy	22	5	1	16	25	57	−32	16	Relegation to Liga Leumit

Updated to match(es) played on 29 May 2018. Source: Israel Football Association
Rules for classification: 1) Points; 2) Matches won; 3) Head-to head 4) deciding match.

== Leumit League ==
Pos	Team	Pld	W	D	L	GF	GA	GD	Pts	Qualification or relegation (Note: Teams play each other two times (16 rounds) before the league is split into two groups (the top five and the bottom four).)
1	Maccabi Emek Hefer	23	21	1	1	196	7	+189	64	Promotion to Women's Premier League
2	Hapoel Petah Tikva	23	19	1	3	150	12	+138	58	
3	Beitar Ironi Ma'ale Adumim	24	17	0	7	147	40	+107	51	
4	Beitar Kfar Kanna	23	7	3	13	48	107	−59	24	
5	Bnot Eilat	23	7	1	15	56	121	−65	22	
6	Hapoel Pardesiya	19	8	3	8	36	65	−29	27	
7	Maccabi Tzur Shalom Bialik	19	6	3	10	34	83	−49	21	
8	Hapoel Marmorek	19	2	2	15	15	111	−96	8	
9	Maccabi Be'er Sheva	19	1	2	16	11	147	−136	5	
10	Hapoel Bnot Lod	0	0	0	0	0	0	0	0	Excluded from the league

Updated to match(es) played on 24 January 2019. Source:
Rules for classification: 1) Points; 2) Matches won; 3) Play-off.
