= 2008–09 Ligat Nashim =

Ligat Nashim
- Season: 2008–09
- Matches: 132
- Goals: 881 (6.67 per match)

The 2008–09 Ligat Nashim was the 11th season of women's league football under the Israeli Football Association.

The league was won by Maccabi Holon, its sixth consecutive title. By winning, Maccabi Holon qualified to 2009–10 UEFA Women's Champions League.

== League table ==
Pos	Team	Pld	W	D	L	GF	GA	GD	Pts	Qualification
1	Maccabi Holon	22	22	0	0	151	6	+145	66	Qualified to UEFA Women's Champions League
2	ASA Tel Aviv University	22	20	0	2	149	13	+136	60	
3	Maccabi Kishronot Hadera	22	18	0	4	120	21	+99	54	
4	F.C. Ramat HaSharon	22	13	1	8	83	39	+44	40	
5	Hapoel Ironi Petah Tikva	22	12	1	9	88	54	+34	37	
6	Bnot Sakhnin	22	12	1	9	74	54	+20	37	
7	Hapoel Be'er Sheva	22	8	3	11	66	61	+5	27	
8	Maccabi Be'er Sheva	22	6	5	11	48	65	−17	23	
9	Maccabi Tzur Shalom Bialik	22	7	1	14	42	55	−13	22	
10	Hapoel Rishon LeZion	22	4	1	17	24	117	−93	13	
11	Bnot Caesarea Tiv'on	22	2	3	17	34	99	−65	9	
12	Hapoel Marmorek	22	0	0	22	2	297	−295	0	

== Top scorers ==
Rank	Scorer	Club	Goals
1	Shirley Ohana	Maccabi Holon	56
2	Silvi Jan	ASA Tel Aviv University	33
3	Hanin Nassar	Bnot Sakhnin	31
4	Netanela Hajaj	Hapoel Ironi Petah Tikva	28
5	Rim Mussa	Maccabi Kishronot Hadera	25
6	Nura Abu Shanab	Bnot Sakhnin	23
7	Adva Twil	F.C. Ramat HaSharon	21
7	Daniel Sofer	Maccabi Kishronot Hadera	21
7	Karin Rahamim	Hapoel Be'er Sheva	21
10	Sarit Shenar	ASA Tel Aviv University	19
