= 2014–15 Ligat Nashim =

Ligat Nashim Rishona
- Season: 2014–15
- Matches: 96
- Goals: 495 (5.16 per match)
- Top goalscorer: Sarit Shenar (31)

The 2014–15 Ligat Nashim was the 17th season of women's league football under the Israeli Football Association. League matches began on 25 November 2014 and ended on 26 May 2015.

On 21 May 2015, in the penultimate match of the season, ASA Tel Aviv University secured the title, which is its 6th consecutive title and 7th overall. By winning, ASA Tel Aviv qualified to 2015–16 UEFA Women's Champions League.

For this season, the Israel women's national under-19 football team participated in the league, in order to gain experience and cohesion in preparation for the 2015 UEFA Women's Under-19 Championship.

In the second division, Maccabi Be'er Sheva won the league and was promoted to the top division.

== Ligat Nashim Rishona ==
=== Regular season ===
Teams play 16 matches in the regular season.

Pos	Team	Pld	W	D	L	GF	GA	GD	Pts	Qualification
1	ASA Tel Aviv University	16	11	4	1	76	16	+60	37	Championship Group
2	Maccabi Kishronot Hadera	16	11	3	2	60	16	+44	36	Championship Group
3	F.C. Kiryat Gat	16	11	1	4	63	21	+42	34	Championship Group
4	Youth Academy	16	8	2	6	61	17	+44	26	Championship Group
5	F.C. Ramat HaSharon	16	4	7	5	35	19	+16	19	Championship Group
6	Hapoel Ironi Petah Tikva	16	5	3	8	32	34	−2	18	Relegation Group
7	Maccabi Holon	16	5	2	9	35	41	−6	17	Relegation Group
8	Bnot Sakhnin	16	5	2	9	30	49	−19	17	Relegation Group
9	Maccabi Tzur Shalom Bialik	16	0	0	16	3	182	−179	0	Relegation Group

Source: IFA (in Hebrew)
Rules for classification: 1st points; 2nd matches won; 3rd decision match

==== Regular season results ====
Home \ Away	ASA	BNS	KGT	RHS	HPT	MKH	HLN	MTZ	YTH
ASA Tel Aviv		10–3	4–1	0–0	3–1	1–1	3–0 (Note: Awarded as a 3–0 as Hapoel Petah Tikva and Maccabi Holon fielded only 6 players against their respective opponents.)	14–0	3–1
Bnot Sakhnin	1–4		2–1	1–0	3–1	1–2	3–3	5–0	1–3
F.C. Kiryat Gat	2–3	8–0		3–1	3–2	4–3	3–2	14–0	1–0
F.C. Ramat HaSharon	1–1	1–1	1–2		2–2	2–1	1–2	13–0	0–3
Hapoel Petah Tikva	0–4	3–0	1–2	1–1		0–3	2–1	7–1	2–1
Maccabi Kishronot Hadera	2–0	3–1	0–0	0–0	4–1		3–2	13–0	3–1
Maccabi Holon	2–5	3–0	1–0	1–2	3–3	2–6		7–0	0–7
Maccabi Tzur Shalom Bialik	0–20	1–7	0–17	1–10	0–6	0–13	0–6		0–12
Youth Academy	1–1	6–1	1–2	0–0	3–0	1–3	3–0	18–0	

Updated to match(es) played on 24 March 2015. Source: Israel Football Association
Legend: Blue = home team win; Yellow = draw; Red = away team win.

=== Championship group ===
Teams play eight more games, for a total of 24.

Pos	Team	Pld	W	D	L	GF	GA	GD	Pts	Qualification
1	ASA Tel Aviv University (C)	24	16	5	3	95	30	+65	53	Qualification to Champions League
2	F.C. Kiryat Gat	24	15	4	5	80	33	+47	49	
3	Maccabi Kishronot Hadera	24	15	3	6	71	27	+44	48	
4	F.C. Ramat HaSharon	24	7	9	8	48	31	+17	30	
5	Youth Academy	24	8	4	12	69	36	+33	28	

Source: IFA (in Hebrew)
Rules for classification: 1st points; 2nd matches won; 3rd decision match
(C) Champions

==== Championship group results ====
Home \ Away	ASA	KGT	RHS	MKH	YTH
ASA Tel Aviv		2–3	2–1	2–1	4–2
F.C. Kiryat Gat	2–2		3–4	1–0	3–0
F.C. Ramat HaSharon	3–1	1–1		2–3	1–1
Maccabi Kishronot Hadera	2–3	0–1	1–0		2–1
Youth Academy	0–3	3–3	0–1	1–2	

Updated to match(es) played on 26 May 2015. Source: Israel Football Association
Legend: Blue = home team win; Yellow = draw; Red = away team win.

=== Relegation group ===
Pos	Team	Pld	W	D	L	GF	GA	GD	Pts	Relegation
1	Bnot Sakhnin	19	8	2	9	48	53	−5	26	
2	Maccabi Holon	19	7	2	10	45	45	0	23	
3	Hapoel Ironi Petah Tikva	19	6	3	10	42	38	+4	21	
4	Maccabi Tzur Shalom Bialik (R)	19	0	0	19	3	208	−205	0	Relegation to Ligat Nashim Shniya

Source: IFA (in Hebrew)
Rules for classification: 1st points; 2nd matches won; 3rd decision match
(R) Relegated

==== Relegation group results ====
Home \ Away	BNS	HPT	HLN	MTZ
Bnot Sakhnin		3–1		
Hapoel Petah Tikva			0–1	9–0
Maccabi Holon	3–4			6–0
Maccabi Tzur Shalom Bialik	0–11			

Updated to match(es) played on 30 March 2015. Source: Israel Football Association
Legend: Blue = home team win; Yellow = draw; Red = away team win.

=== Top scorers ===
Rank	Scorer	Club	Goals
1	(Israel) Sarit Shenar	ASA Tel Aviv University	31
2	(Israel) Dovrat Bendel	Hap. Petah Tikva/F.C. Kiryat Gat	30
3	(Israel) Hanin Nasser	Bnot Sakhnin	21
4	(Israel) Shirley Ohana	Maccabi Kishronot Hadera	20
5	(Israel) Arava Shahaf	F.C. Ramat HaSharon	18
6	(Nigeria) Akudo Iwuagwu	F.C. Kiryat Gat	17
7	(Nigeria) Chioma Nwabueze	Maccabi Holon	16
8	(Israel) Mor Efraim	F.C. Kiryat Gat	14
9	(Israel) Eden Avital	Youth Academy	13
10	(Israel) Adva Twil	Maccabi Kishronot Hadera	12
10	(Israel) Nura Abu Shanab	Hapoel Petah Tikva	12
10	(Israel) Shai Perl	Youth Academy	12

== Ligat Nashim Shniya ==
Ligat Nashim Shniya
- Matches: 39
- Goals: 232 (5.95 per match)
- Top goalscorer: Karin Peretz (14)

=== Format changes ===
As 5 teams registered to the second division, the participating clubs played a 4 round-robin schedules for a planned total of 16 matches for each club.

=== League table ===
Pos	Team	Pld	W	D	L	GF	GA	GD	Pts	Promotion or relegation
1	Maccabi Be'er Sheva (C)	16	14	1	1	68	10	+58	43	Promotion to Ligat Nashim Rishona
2	Bnot Netanya	16	13	1	2	79	12	+67	40	
3	Maccabi Kfar Saba	16	7	1	8	48	51	−3	22	
4	Hapoel Be'er Sheva	16	2	1	13	18	76	−58	7	
5	Bnot Eilat	16	2	0	14	19	83	−64	6	

Source: IFA (in Hebrew)
Rules for classification: 1st points; 2nd matches won; 3rd decision match
(C) Champions

=== Results ===
Matches 1-10

Home \ Away	BEL	BNT	HBS	MBS	MKS
Bnot Eilat		0–7	8–0	0–3	1–10
Bnot Netanya	7–0		9–2	1–2	6–2
Hapoel Be'er Sheva	3–1	0–6		1–5	0–3
Maccabi Be'er Sheva	5–1	1–2	1–0		5–1
Maccabi Kfar Saba	4–1	1–4	2–1	2–3	

Updated to match(es) played on 18 April 2015. Source: Israel Football Association
Legend: Blue = home team win; Yellow = draw; Red = away team win.

Matches 11-20

Home \ Away	BEL	BNT	HBS	MBS	MKS
Bnot Eilat		0–4	5–2	0–3 (Note: Awarded as a 3–0 to Maccabi Be'er Sheva, as Bnot Eilat failed to appear to the match.)	0–7
Bnot Netanya	10–0		8–0	0–0	7–1
Hapoel Be'er Sheva	6–1	0–5		0–10	2–2
Maccabi Be'er Sheva	3–0	2–1	8–0		7–1
Maccabi Kfar Saba	9–1	1–2	2–1	0–10	

Updated to match(es) played on 15 May 2015. Source: Israel Football Association
Legend: Blue = home team win; Yellow = draw; Red = away team win.

=== Top scorers ===
Rank	Scorer	Club	Goals
1	Karin Peretz	Maccabi Be'er Sheva	14
2	Nofar Funis	Bnot Netanya	13
3	Reli Flus	Maccabi Be'er Sheva	12
3	Shaked Elimelech	Maccabi Kfar Saba	12
5	Tali Stolovitzky	Bnot Eilat	11
