= Itaf Qaissi =

Israeli footballer (born 2001)

Personal information
- Date of birth: 5 October 2001 (age 25)
- Place of birth: Jerusalem, Israel
- Positions: Defender; midfielder

Team information
- Current team: Rio Ave
- Number: 4

Youth career
- Hapoel Jerusalem
- IFA Girls' Academy

Senior career*
Years	Team	Apps	(Gls)
2017–2019	IFA Girls' Academy	35	(0)
2019–2020	Kiryat Gat	13	(0)
2020–2021	Hapoel Be'er Sheva	64	(0)
2021–2026	Kiryat Gat	53	(1)
2026–	Rio Ave	5	(0)

International career^{‡}
2018	Israel U17	1	(0)
2020	Israel U19	3	(0)
2023–	Israel	20	(0)
- * Club domestic league appearances and goals as of 8 November 2026 ‡ National team caps and goals as of 8 November 2026

Itaf Qaissi (Arabic: عيطاف القيسي, pronounced [ʕajˈṭaːf alˈqajsij]; Hebrew: עיטאף אלקיסי; born 1 October 2001), also known as Itaf Alkisi, is an Israeli professional footballer who plays as a centre-back or defensive midfielder for Campeonato Nacional Feminino (Liga BPI) club Rio Ave and the Israel national team. She previously played for Ligat Nashim club Kiryat Gat and represented Israel at under-17 and under-19 level.

== Early life ==
Qaissi was born on 5 October 2001 in Jerusalem, Jerusalem District, Israel. She is Arab.

== Club career ==
=== IFA Girls' Academy (2017–2019) ===
Qaissi began her career at Ligat Nashim club IFA Girls' Academy during the 2017–18 season. She made 17 appearances across the course of the season.

Qaissi remained at the club for the 2018–19 season. She finished the season having made 18 appearances for the club. She left the club at the end of the season, having made 35 appearances for the club.

=== Kiryat Gat (2019–2020) ===
Ahead of the 2019–20 season, Qaissi remained in Ligat Nashim and signed for Kiryat Gat. However, she only spent one season at the club, making 14 appearances (13 in the league and one in the Israeli Women's Cup).

=== Hapoel Be'er Sheva (2020–2023) ===
Qaissi signed for a third Ligat Nashim club ahead of the 2020–21 season, joining Hapoel Be'er Sheva. Over the course of the season, she made 13 appearances (nine in the league, two in the cup and two in the Athena Cup, the then-newly-created league cup) and scored three goals (one in the cup and two in the league cup).

Qaissi remained at the club for the 2021–22 season. That season, she played 29 games (24 in the league, two in the cup and three in the league cup) and scored five goals (two in the cup and three in the league cup).

Qaissi played her third season at the club in the 2022–23 season. That season, she played 31 games (27 in the league, one in the cup and three in the league cup) and scored four goals (one in the cup and three in the league cup).

Qaissi's final season at the club was the 2023–24 season, a season that was partly interrupted by the 7 October attacks by Palestinian militant group Hamas on Israel in 2023. She left the club midseason, having made four appearances (all of which were in the league) that season. Over the course of her time at Hapoel, she made a total of 77 appearances (64 in the league, five in the cup and eight in the league cup) and scored 12 goals (four in the cup and eight in the league cup).

=== Kiryat Gat (2024–2026) ===
Qaissi returned to Kiryat Gat during the 2023–24 season. She was part of the squad that won a domestic double, winning a fourth consecutive and sixth overall league title as well as a third cup. She made a total of five appearances that season (three in the league and two in the UEFA Women's Champions League (UWCL) first qualifying round).

Qaissi spent a second season in her second stint at the club for the 2024–25 season. She was part of the squad that won a second consecutive domestic double that season, winning a fifth consecutive and seventh overall league title (a league record) as well as a second consecutive cup and a fifth overall. That season she made a total of 32 appearances (24 in the league, three in the cup, three in the league cup and two in the Champions League first round) and scored six goals (three each in the cup and the league cup).

Qaissi's third season at the club during her second stint was the 2025–26 season. The club finished runners-up that season, with Hapoel Katamon Jerusalem (HKJ) winning their first ever title. However, the club still won a trophy, as they won the league cup earlier in the season. Across the course of the season, she made 35 appearances (26 in the league, three in the cup, five in the league cup and one in the Champions League first round) and scored two goals (one each in the league and the cup). She departed the club at the end of the season, making a total of 72 appearances (53 in the league, six in the cup, eight in the league cup and five in the Champions League first round) and scoring eight goals (one in the league, four in the cup and three in the league cup).

=== Rio Ave (2026–) ===
Ahead of the 2026–27 season, Qaissi moved to Portugal and signed for Campeonato Nacional Feminino (Liga BPI) club Rio Ave, joining Kiryat Gat and Israel national team teammate Noa Selimhodžić. She made her début in the second match of the season on 18 September 2026, playing the entirety of a 2–0 defeat to Benfica at home at the Estádio do Rio Ave FC in Vila do Conde, Porto District.

== International career ==
=== Israel U17 ===
Qaissi received her first and only call-up by manager Iris Antman for the Israel under-17 national team for the 2018 UEFA Women's Under-17 Championship qualification elite round from 8 to 14 March 2018, with Israel being placed as a host nation into Group 3. She made her first and only appearance on 11 March 2018, coming on as a substitute in a 1–0 defeat to Denmark at Shefayim National Team Complex in Shefayim. Israel finished at the bottom of the group and were eliminated, missing out on the tournament proper in Lithuania.

=== Israel U19 ===
Qaissi was selected for Antman for the Israel under-19 national team for the first and only time for the 2020 UEFA Women's Under-19 Championship qualification matches, for which Israel was placed in Group 6, hosted in Austria. She played the entirety of all three matches: a 2–0 defeat to hosts Austria at WF-Stadion in Bad Wimsbach-Neydharting on 1 October 2019, a 1–0 defeat to Switzerland at the same stadium on 4 October 2019, and a 5–1 victory over Latvia at DANA Arena in Windischgarsten on 7 October 2019. As the fourth-best third-placed team, Israel advanced to the elite round, being drawn into Group 2 in Belfast, Northern Ireland before the round and tournament proper (scheduled to be held in Georgia) were cancelled by the Union of European Football Associations (UEFA) due to the COVID-19 pandemic in Europe.

=== Israel ===
Qaissi received her first call-up for the Israel senior national team for two friendly matches against Hungary on 7 and 11 April 2023, both held at Alcufer Stadion in Győr, Hungary. She made her début in the first match, a 3–1 defeat. That year, she made four appearances for the national team, with the remaining three being in the UEFA Women's Nations League (UWNL). Israel were in League C of the Nations League, finishing top of Group C4 after going unbeaten and thus earning promotion to League B.

In 2024, Qaissi once again played four matches for Israel. All four of these were in UEFA Women's Euro 2025 qualifying, with Israel being relegated from League B back to League C after finishing last in Group B2 and not winning a single game, thus missing the tournament proper in Switzerland.

In 2025, she once again played four games. All four of these were in the Nations League, with Israel again earning promotion from League C to League B after winning Group C5 unbeaten.

In 2026, she established herself as a more regular player in the squad following her club move from Kiryat Gat to Rio Ave. She played a total of eight games that year, playing all eight of Israel's 2027 FIFA Women's World Cup qualification matches. Israel were in League B, finishing third in Group B4 and thus earning a spot in the playoffs whilst still being relegated back to League C as one of the two worst third-placed teams (with Israel being ranked the worst of the four). After a 9–3 aggregate loss to Switzerland in the playoffs, Israel were eliminated from qualifying for the final tournament in Brazil.

== Career statistics ==
As of 8 November 2026

=== Club ===
Appearances and goals by club, season and competition
Club	Season	League			National cup (Note: Includes the Israeli Women's Cup and the Taça de Portugal Feminina)		League cup (Note: Includes the Athena Cup and the Taça da Liga Feminina)		Europe		Total	
Club	Season	Division	Apps	Goals	Apps	Goals	Apps	Goals	Apps	Goals	Apps	Goals
IFA Girls' Academy	2017–18	Ligat Nashim	17	0	0	0	–		–		17	0
IFA Girls' Academy	2018–19	Ligat Nashim	18	0	0	0	–		–		18	0
IFA Girls' Academy	Total		35	0	0	0	0	0	0	0	35	0
Kiryat Gat	2019–20	Ligat Nashim	13	0	1	0	–		–		14	0
Hapoel Be'er Sheva	2020–21	Ligat Nashim	9	0	2	1	2	2	–		13	3
Hapoel Be'er Sheva	2021–22	Ligat Nashim	24	0	2	2	3	3	–		29	5
Hapoel Be'er Sheva	2022–23	Ligat Nashim	27	0	1	1	3	3	–		31	4
Hapoel Be'er Sheva	2023–24	Ligat Nashim	4	0	0	0	0	0	–		4	0
Hapoel Be'er Sheva	Total		64	0	5	4	8	8	0	0	77	12
Kiryat Gat	2023–24	Ligat Nashim	3	0	0	0	0	0	2 (Note: Appearances in the UEFA Women's Champions League (UWCL))	0	5	0
Kiryat Gat	2024–25	Ligat Nashim	24	0	3	3	3	3	2	0	32	6
Kiryat Gat	2025–26	Ligat Nashim	26	1	3	1	5	0	1	0	35	2
Kiryat Gat	Total		53	1	6	4	8	3	5	0	72	8
Rio Ave	2026–27	Campeonato Nacional Feminino	5	0	1	0	2	0	–		7	0
Career total			170	1	13	8	18	11	5	0	205	0

=== International ===
Appearances and goals by national team and year
National team	Year	Apps	Goals
Israel U17	2018	1	0
Israel U19	2020	3	0
Israel	2023	4	0
Israel	2024	4	0
Israel	2025	4	0
Israel	2026	8	0
Israel	Total	20	0
Career total		24	0

== Honours ==
Kiryat Gat

- Ligat Nashim: 2023–24 season, 2024–25
- Israeli Women's Cup: 2023–24, 2024–25
- Athena Cup: 2025–26
