= Eden Avital =

Israeli footballer (born 1997)

Eden Avital עדן אביטל
Personal information
- Date of birth: 25 March 1997 (age 29)
- Place of birth: Tel Aviv, Israel
- Position: Attacking midfielder

Team information
- Current team: Hapoel Tel Aviv
- Number: 10

Youth career
- 2007–2010: Bnei Yehuda Tel Aviv
- 2010–2013: ASA Tel Aviv
- 2013–2014: Girls Football Academy

Senior career*
Years	Team	Apps	(Gls)
2014–2015	Girls Football Academy	24	(13)
2015–2018	ASA Tel Aviv	70	(52)
2018–2019	Kiryat Gat	24	(11)
2019–2020	Albi	8	(2)
2021	Kiryat Gat	11	(3)
2021–2023	Soyaux	27	(3)
2023–2025	Hapoel Petah Tikva	34	(13)
2025–	Hapoel Tel Aviv	1	(0)

International career^{‡}
2012–2013	Israel U17	11	(1)
2015	Israel U19	15	(7)
2014–	Israel	50	(7)
- * Club domestic league appearances and goals as of 25 February 2025 ‡ National team caps and goals as of 3 June 2025

Eden Avital (Hebrew: עדן אביטל; born 25 March 1997) is an Israeli footballer who plays as an attacking midfielder for the Israeli football club Hapoel Tel Aviv and for the Israeli national team. She has previously played in Israel for the Girls Football Academy, ASA Tel Aviv, Kiryat Gat, and Hapoel Petah Tikva as well as in France for Albi and Soyaux.

== Club career ==
=== ASA Tel Aviv ===
Avital grew up in ASA Tel Aviv, and was noticed when she scored 27 league goals for the club in the 2015–16 Ligat Nashim season.

=== Kiryat Gat ===
In the summer before the 2018–19 Ligat Nashim season, Avital joined Ligat Nashim defending champion Kiryat Gat. The club took part in the 2018–19 UEFA Women's Champions League qualifying round, finishing 3rd in the group. Avital took part in all three matches: a 1–0 loss to Spartak Subotica, a 3–0 loss to Basel, and a 4–4 draw with Breznica in which she scored the second goal. The club ended the domestic season as runners-up to the title, finishing 3 points behind Avital's previous club ASA Tel Aviv, with which they drew 1–1 three rounds before the end of the season.

=== Albi ===
In October 2019, Avital joined French Division 2 Féminine club Albi. She made her professional debut for the club against AS Domératoise in the first round of the 2019–20 Coupe de France Féminine and scored a penalty for the third goal of the 5–0 victory. The next week, she made her first league appearance, playing 70 minutes in a 5–0 loss to Issy. She scored her first league goals for the club a couple of months later, scoring a brace in a 2–1 victory over Toulouse. During her season with the club, Avital scored two goals in eight league games and one goal in the two games she played in the Coupe de France.

=== Return to Kiryat Gat ===
In January 2021, Avital returned to join Kiryat Gat in Israel's Ligat Nashim due to the stoppage of the European championships due to the COVID-19 pandemic. They won the double that season, placing first in the 2020–21 Ligat Nashim and winning the 2020–21 Israeli Women's Cup. During the season, Avital scored 6 goals for the club: 3 in the league and 3 in the cup.

=== Soyaux ===
In July 2021, after her successful season with Kiryat Gat and following offers from clubs in Germany, Netherlands, Sweden, and Iceland, Avital returned to France and joined Soyaux from the Division 1 Féminine. In October 2021, she debuted for the club in the fifth round of the 2021–22 Division 1 Féminine, coming on as a substitute in the 59th minute of a 2–1 loss against Dijon. The next month, she made her first start, playing the first half of a league match against Guingamp which ended in a 2–2 draw. On 26 February 2022, Avital scored her first goal for the club, scoring a consolation goal in a 5–1 loss to Issy. During her two years with Soyaux, she scored 3 goals in 27 league appearances.

=== Hapoel Petah Tikva ===
In August 2023, after two years with Soyaux, Avital returned to Israel, joining Hapoel Petah Tikva. She scored her first goal for the club in a 3–2 victory over Ramat HaSharon.

=== Hapoel Tel Aviv ===
In February 2025, Avital joined her hometown club Hapoel Tel Aviv, signing a two-and-a-half year contract. Her first match for the club was a cup game against her former club Hapoel Petah Tikva, in which she missed a penalty in a 2–0 loss.

== Style of play ==
Avital is a quick attacking midfielder, who likes playing on the wing.

== International career ==
Avital made her debut for the Israeli senior national team in 2014, a month before her seventeenth birthday, against Switzerland. She appeared for the team during the 2019 FIFA Women's World Cup qualifying cycle.

== International goals ==
No.	Date	Venue	Opponent	Score	Result	Competition
1.	23 June 2022	Stadion Lokomotiv, Plovdiv, Bulgaria	Bulgaria	2–0	2–0	2023 FIFA Women's World Cup qualification
2.	1 September 2022	Ness Ziona Stadium, Ness Ziona, Israel	Bulgaria	1–0	2–0	2023 FIFA Women's World Cup qualification
3.	23 November 2023	Globall Football Park, Telki, Hungary	Kazakhstan	2–0	2–0	2023–24 UEFA Women's Nations League C
4.	2 December 2023	Republican Stadium, Yerevan, Armenia	Armenia	4–0	6–1	2023–24 UEFA Women's Nations League C
5.	9 April 2024	Ménfői úti Stadion, Győr, Hungary	Serbia	2–3	2–4	UEFA Women's Euro 2025 qualifying
6.	21 February 2025	Stadion Aleksandar Shalamanov, Sofia, Bulgaria	Bulgaria	3–1	3–1	2025 UEFA Women's Nations League C
7.	8 April 2025	Budaörsi Városi Stadium, Budaörs, Hungary	Bulgaria	1–2	3–3	2025 UEFA Women's Nations League C

== Honors ==
- Ligat Nashim Champion: 2011–12, 2012–13, 2020–21
- Israeli Women's Cup Winner: 2011–12, 2016–17, 2020–21
