= Hanit Schwartz =

Israeli footballer

Hanit Schwartz חנית שוורץ
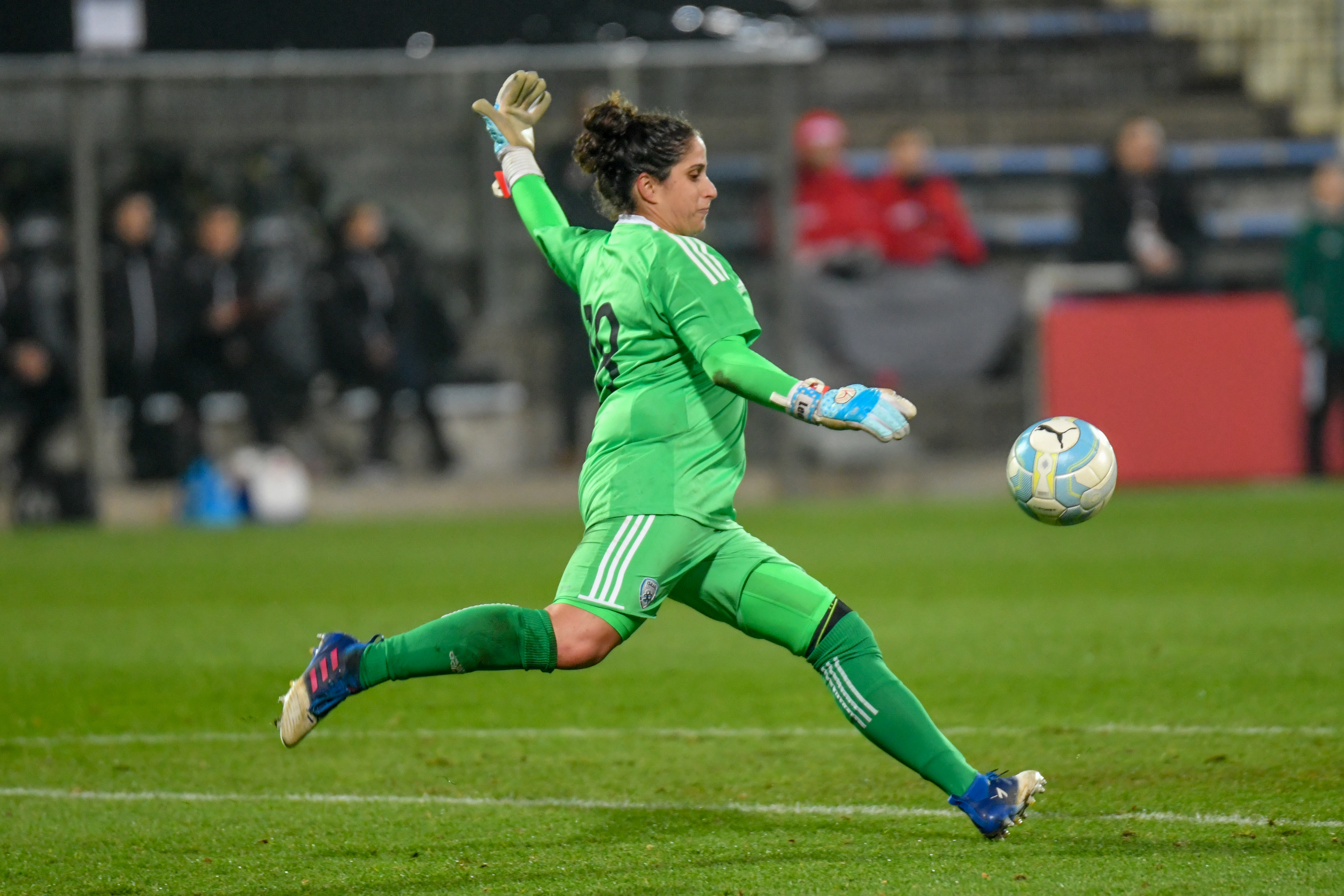

Personal information
- Full name: Hanit Schwartz
- Date of birth: 23 October 1987 (age 39)
- Place of birth: Be'er Sheva, Israel
- Position: Goalkeeper

Team information
- Current team: F.C. Ramat HaSharon
- Number: 22

College career
Years	Team	Apps	(Gls)
2008–2011	Martin Methodist RedHawks		

Senior career*
Years	Team	Apps	(Gls)
2000–2008	Hapoel Be'er Sheva		
2011–2012	Maccabi Holon	8	(0)
2012–2013	Maccabi Be'er Sheva	15	(0)
2013–	F.C. Ramat HaSharon	34	(0)

International career^{‡}
2003–2005	Israel U19	12	(0)
2005–	Israel	28	(0)
- * Club domestic league appearances and goals as of 3 March 2015 ‡ National team caps and goals as of 6 December 2021

Hanit Schwartz (or Schwarz, Hebrew: חנית שוורץ; born 23 October 1987) is an Israeli football goalkeeper, currently playing for F.C. Ramat HaSharon. She is a member of the Israeli national team, since making her debut in 2005, against Estonia

== Club career ==
Schwartz had played in the Israeli First League since 2000, first appearing for Hapoel Be'er Sheva, where she had played until 2008. Between 2008 and 2011, Schwartz attended Martin Methodist College, making 77 appearances for the Redhawks' women's soccer team, allowing only 36 goals. After graduating, Schwartz returned to Israel and appeared for Maccabi Holon, Maccabi Be'er Sheva and F.C. Ramat HaSharon

== International career ==
Schwartz made her debut for the Israel women's national football team in 2005 against Estonia and so far played 28 matches for the national team. Schwartz had also played for the U-19 national team, making 12 appearances between 2003 and 2005
