= 2019–20 Ligat Nashim =

22nd season of women's league football under the Israeli Football Association

Israeli Women's Premier League
- Season: 2019–20
- Champions: Ramat HaSharon
- Champions League: Ramat HaSharon

The 2019–20 Ligat Nashim was the 22nd season of women's league football under the Israeli Football Association.

The defending champions were ASA Tel Aviv University.

== Teams and locations ==
Location of the teams in the 2018-19 Ligat Nashim
Yellow: Premier League; Blue: Liga Leumit;

== Ligat al ==
Team	Location	Stadium	Capacity
ASA Tel Aviv University	Tel Aviv	Tel Aviv University Football Stadium	1,000
Kiryat Gat	Kiryat Gat	Rogozin Synthetic grass pitch, Kiryat Gat	1,000
Maccabi Kishronot Hadera	Hadera	Hapoel Hadera Stadium	5,000
Maccabi Holon	Holon	Holon Municipal Stadium	3,000
F.C. Ramat HaSharon	Ramat HaSharon	Grundman Stadium	4,300
Hapoel Ra'anana	Ra'anana	Karnei Oren Memorial Field	2,500
Bnot Netanya	Netanya	Shapira Training Ground	1,000
Maccabi Emek Hefer	Emek Hefer		

=== League table ===
Pos	Team	Pld	W	D	L	GF	GA	GD	Pts	Qualification or relegation (Note: Teams play each other two times (14 rounds) before the league is split into two groups (the top four and the bottom four).)
1	F.C. Ramat HaSharon	14	11	2	1	41	8	+33	35	Qualification for the Champions League
2	F.C. Kiryat Gat	14	10	0	4	34	19	+15	30	
3	ASA Tel Aviv University	14	9	2	3	38	12	+26	29	
4	Maccabi Emek Hefer	14	8	0	6	29	21	+8	24	
5	Maccabi Kishronot Hadera	14	8	0	6	33	30	+3	24	
6	Maccabi Holon	14	3	2	9	20	31	−11	11	
7	Bnot Netanya	14	3	0	11	24	45	−21	9	
8	Hapoel Ra'anana	14	1	0	13	10	63	−53	3	Relegation play-offs

Updated to match(es) played on 24 April 2021. Source: Soccerway
Rules for classification: 1) Points; 2) Matches won; 3) Head-to head 4) deciding match.

== Liga leumit ==
Team	Location	Stadium	Capacity
Hapoel Be'er Sheva	Be'er Sheva	Vasermil Stadium	13,000
Hapoel Petah Tikva	Petah Tikva	HaMoshava Stadium	11,500
Beitar Ironi Ma'ale Adumim	Ma'ale Adumim	Municipal Stadium	
Beitar Kfar Kanna	Kfar Kanna		
Bnot Eilat	Eilat	Eilat Rabin Stadium	1,000
Hapoel Pardesiya	Pardesiya		
Maccabi Tzur Shalom Bialik	Kiriyat Bialik	Hapoel Stadium, Kiryat Bialik	2,000
Hapoel Marmorek	Rehovot	Itztoni Stadium	1,500
Maccabi Be'er Sheva	Be'er Sheva	Maccabi Sports Field	3,000
Hapoel Bnot Arava	Sakhnin		

=== Standings ===
Pos	Team	Pld	W	D	L	GF	GA	GD	Pts	Qualification or relegation (Note: Teams play each other two times (18 rounds) before the league is split into two groups (the top five and the bottom five).)
1	Hapoel Be'er Sheva	12	11	1	0	177	5	+172	34	Promotion to Women's Premier League
2	Hapoel Petah Tikva	10	7	1	2	56	6	+50	22	
3	Hapoel Bnot Arava	10	7	1	2	40	11	+29	22	
4	Maccabi Tzur Shalom Bialik	11	6	2	3	27	31	−4	20	
5	Beitar Ironi Ma'ale Adumim	9	6	0	3	24	13	+11	18	
6	Beitar Kfar Kanna	11	4	2	5	18	57	−39	14	
7	Hapoel Pardesiya	11	3	2	6	14	38	−24	11	
8	Bnot Eilat	10	2	1	7	11	55	−44	7	
9	Hapoel Marmorek	11	1	2	8	11	53	−42	5	
10	Maccabi Be'er Sheva	10	0	0	10	2	51	−49	0	

Updated to match(es) played on 24 January 2019. Source:
Rules for classification: 1) Points; 2) Matches won; 3) Play-off.
