= 2009–10 Israeli Women's Cup =

Tournament details
- Country: Israel
- Teams: 10

Final positions
- Champions: Maccabi Holon (8th title)
- Runners-up: Maccabi Be’er Sheva

Tournament statistics
- Matches played: 9
- Goals scored: 36 (4 per match)
- Top goal scorer: Shirley Ohana (6)

The 2009–10 Israeli Women's Cup (Hebrew: גביע המדינה נשים, Gvia HaMedina Nashim) was the 12th season of Israel's women's nationwide football cup competition.

The competition was won, for the 8th consecutive time, by Maccabi Holon who had beaten Maccabi Be'er Sheva 5–0 in the final.

== Results ==
=== First round ===
| 8 February 2010 | Maccabi Holon | 5–1 | Hapoel Petah Tikva | Holon |
| 20:00 | Erez 4'; Ohana 13', 52'; Shino 67'; Fahima 70' | Report | Nigerker 75' | Stadium: Holon New Stadium; Referee: Aviv Chagashi |

| 8 February 2010 | Maccabi Kishronot Hadera | 8–0 | Bnot Caesarea Tiv’on | Netanya |
| 20:30 | Twil 7', 24', 39', 78'; Awisat 25'; David 67'; Arie 76'; Burgerker 85' | Report | | Stadium: Tubruk Stadium; Referee: Idan Goresh |

=== Quarter-finals ===
| 7 March 2010 | Bnot Sakhnin | 3–1 | Maccabi Tzur Shalom Bialik | Sakhnin |
| 18:30 | Nasser 22', 47', 53' | Report | Feiger 29' | Stadium: Doha Stadium; Referee: Moshe Peretz |

| 7 March 2010 | Maccabi Holon | 0–0 (a.e.t.) (4–3 p) | ASA Tel Aviv University | Holon |
| 19:00 | | Report | | Stadium: Holon New Stadium; Referee: Menashe Mashiach |
| | Penalties |
| | V. Cohen (penalty scored); Dayan (penalty scored); Erez (penalty scored); Shino (penalty missed); Fahima (penalty scored) | | (penalty missed) Israel; (penalty scored) Shenar; (penalty scored) Lavi; (penalty missed) Jan; (penalty scored) Fridman |

| 7 March 2010 | Maccabi Be'er Sheva | 3–0 | Hapoel Be'er Sheva | Be'er Sheva |
| 19:00 | Glick 23'; Arotsker 43'; Eni 74' | Report | | Stadium: Neve Noy Stadium; Referee: Moshe Buhbut |

| 7 March 2010 | Hapoel Rishon LeZion | 0–3 | Maccabi Kishronot Hadera | Rishon LeZion |
| 20:00 | | Report | Burgerker 4', 38'; Twil 18' | Stadium: Superland West; Referee: Shlomo Alaluf |

=== Semi-finals ===
| 26 April 2010 | Bnot Sakhnin | 1–2 | Maccabi Be'er Sheva | Ness Ziona |
| 16:00 | Abu Shanab 21' | Report | Eni 11'; Shahaf 66' | Stadium: Ness Ziona Stadium; Referee: Lilach Asulin |

| 26 April 2010 | Maccabi Holon | 5–0 | Maccabi Kishronot Hadera | Ness Ziona |
| 18:15 | Ohana 43', 73'; Tzukrel 45'; V. Cohen 71' | Report | | Stadium: Ness Ziona Stadium; Referee: Rachel Cohen |

=== Final ===
24 May 2010
17:00

| Maccabi Holon | 5–0 | Maccabi Be'er Sheva |
|---|---|---|
| Ohana 24', 40'; V. Cohen 29'; Dayan 49'; Fahima 90' | Report |

Winter Stadium, Ramat Gan
Referee: Rachel Cohen
