= 2013–14 Ligat Nashim =

Ligat Nashim Rishona
- Season: 2013–14
- Matches: 79
- Goals: 372 (4.71 per match)
- Top goalscorer: Sarit Shenar (28)

The 2013–14 Ligat Nashim was the 16th season of women's league football under the Israeli Football Association.

The league was won by ASA Tel Aviv University, its fifth consecutive title and sixth overall. By winning, ASA Tel Aviv qualified to 2014–15 UEFA Women's Champions League.

Maccabi Be'er Sheva finished bottom of the first division and was relegated to the second division, and was replaced by second division winner, Maccabi Tzur Shalom Bialik. The second-bottom club in the first division, Bnot Sakhnin met Bnot Netanya for a spot in Ligat Nashim Rishona, Bnot Sakhnin winning 7–0 to remain in the first division.

== Ligat Nashim Rishona ==
=== Regular season ===
Pos	Team	Pld	W	D	L	GF	GA	GD	Pts	Qualification
1	ASA Tel Aviv University	14	13	1	0	62	8	+54	40	Championship Group
2	Maccabi Kishronot Hadera	14	12	1	1	49	12	+37	37	Championship Group
3	Maccabi Holon	14	9	1	4	50	22	+28	28	Championship Group
4	F.C. Ramat HaSharon	14	6	2	6	34	19	+15	20	Championship Group
5	Hapoel Ironi Petah Tikva	14	5	2	7	36	30	+6	17	Relegation Group
6	F.C. Kiryat Gat	14	4	2	8	26	29	−3	14	Relegation Group
7	Bnot Sakhnin	14	1	1	12	16	59	−43	4	Relegation Group
8	Maccabi Be'er Sheva	14	1	0	13	9	103	−94	3	Relegation Group

=== Championship group ===
Pos	Team	Pld	W	D	L	GF	GA	GD	Pts	Qualification
1	ASA Tel Aviv University	19	17	2	0	74	13	+61	53 (Note: The match between ASA Tel Aviv University and Maccabi Holon, played on 12 May 2014, was abandoned at the 72nd minute, as Holon was left with 6 available players on the pitch. A result wasn’t set for this match.)	Qualified to UEFA Women's Champions League
2	Maccabi Kishronot Hadera	20	13	1	6	56	27	+29	40	
3	Maccabi Holon	19	12	2	5	64	29	+35	38	
4	F.C. Ramat HaSharon	20	8	2	10	42	33	+9	26	

=== Relegation group ===
Pos	Team	Pld	W	D	L	GF	GA	GD	Pts	Qualification or relegation
1	F.C. Kiryat Gat	20	9	2	9	40	37	+3	29	
2	Hapoel Ironi Petah Tikva	20	7	2	11	49	49	0	23	
3	Bnot Sakhnin	20	4	1	15	29	67	−38	13	Relegation/promotion play-offs
4	Maccabi Be'er Sheva	20	3	0	17	18	117	−99	9	Relegated to Ligat Nashim Shniya

==== Promotion/relegation play-off ====
5 May 2013	Bnot Sakhnin	7–0	Bnot Netanya	Beit HaNivharot
19:00	Abu Yunes 15'; H. Zubidat 22'; R. Zubidat 28'; Ibrahim 44', 53', 84'; Mayar Jandawi 66'	Report		Referee: Dror Cohen

=== Top scorers ===
Rank	Scorer	Club	Goals
1	(Israel) Sarit Shenar	ASA Tel Aviv University	28
2	(Israel) Nura Abu Shanab	Hapoel Petah Tikva	18
3	(Israel) Saja Ibrahim	Bnot Sakhnin	15
3	(Nigeria) Akudo Iwuagwu	F.C. Kiryat Gat	15
5	(Israel) Arava Shahaf	F.C. Ramat HaSharon	14
6	(Israel) (Netherlands) Levia Van Ouwerkerk	Maccabi Kishronot Hadera	13
6	(Israel) Shirley Ohana	Maccabi Holon	13
8	(Israel) Dovrat Bendel	Hapoel Petah Tikva	12
9	(Israel) Adva Twil	Maccabi Kishronot Hadera	11
9	(Nigeria) Chioma Nwabueze	Maccabi Holon	11

== Ligat Nashim Shniya ==
Ligat Nashim Shniya
- Matches: 45
- Goals: 280 (6.22 per match)
- Top goalscorer: Tali Stolovitzky (31)

=== Format changes ===
As 7 teams registered to the second division, the participating clubs played a conventional double round-robin schedule for a total of 14 rounds, followed by one round-robin schedule, for a planned total of 18 matches for each club. As Bnot Caesarea Tiv’on withdrew from the competition mid-season, the schedule was shortened to 15 matches for each club.

=== League table ===
Pos	Team	Pld	W	D	L	GF	GA	GD	Pts	Promotion or qualification
1	Maccabi Tzur Shalom Bialik	15	13	0	2	74	8	+66	39	Promoted to Ligat Nashim Rishona
2	Bnot Netanya	15	10	2	3	75	14	+61	32	Promotion/relegation play-offs
3	Bnot Eilat	15	8	1	6	40	32	+8	25	
4	Maccabi Kfar Saba	15	7	2	6	60	26	+34	23	
5	Hapoel Be’er Sheva	15	4	1	10	25	63	−38	13	
6	F.C. Kafr Yasif	15	0	0	15	6	137	−131	0	

Bnot Caesarea Tiv'on withdrew from the league after 8 matches, and its results were annulled.

=== Top scorers ===
Rank	Scorer	Club	Goals
1	Tali Stolovitzky	Bnot Eilat	31
2	Amira Arkiva	Hapoel Be’er Sheva	19
2	May Raz	Bnot Netanya	19
2	Yarin Asayag	Maccabi Tzur Shalom Bialik	19
5	Orel Feiger	Maccabi Tzur Shalom Bialik	16
5	Ronza Jeries	Maccabi Tzur Shalom Bialik	16
