= 2011–12 Ligat Nashim =

Ligat Nashim Rishona
- Season: 2011–12
- Matches: 80
- Goals: 410 (5.13 per match)
- Top goalscorer: Silvi Jan (34)

The 2011–12 Ligat Nashim was the 14th season of women's league football under the Israeli Football Association.

The league was won by ASA Tel Aviv University, its third consecutive title and fourth overall. By winning, ASA Tel Aviv qualified to 2012–13 UEFA Women's Champions League.

Maccabi Tzur Shalom Bialik finished bottom of the first division and was relegated to the second division, and was replaced by second division winner, F.C. Ramat HaSharon

== Ligat Nashim Rishona ==
=== Regular season ===
Pos	Team	Pld	W	D	L	GF	GA	GD	Pts	Qualification
1	ASA Tel Aviv University	14	11	3	0	88	2	+86	36	Championship Group
2	Maccabi Holon	17	12	2	3	71	11	+60	38	Championship Group
3	Maccabi Kishronot Hadera	14	8	3	3	36	13	+23	27	Championship Group
4	Maccabi Be'er Sheva	14	4	4	6	27	37	−10	16	Championship Group
5	Bnot Sakhnin	14	4	3	7	23	38	−15	15	Relegation Group
6	Hapoel Ironi Petah Tikva	14	4	2	8	19	49	−30	14	Relegation Group
7	Hapoel Be'er Sheva	14	2	1	11	13	64	−51	7	Relegation Group
8	Maccabi Tzur Shalom Bialik	14	2	0	12	9	72	−63	6	Relegation Group

=== Championship group ===
Pos	Team	Pld	W	D	L	GF	GA	GD	Pts	Qualification
1	ASA Tel Aviv University	20	17	3	0	118	4	+114	54	Qualified to UEFA Women's Champions League
2	Maccabi Holon	20	16	2	2	94	21	+73	50	
3	Maccabi Kishronot Hadera	20	8	4	8	43	34	+9	28	
4	Maccabi Be'er Sheva	20	5	5	10	32	69	−37	20	

=== Relegation group ===
Pos	Team	Pld	W	D	L	GF	GA	GD	Pts	Relegation
1	Bnot Sakhnin	20	7	5	8	54	43	+11	26	
2	Hapoel Ironi Petah Tikva	20	6	5	9	29	71	−42	23	
3	Hapoel Be'er Sheva	20	3	5	12	24	77	−53	14	
4	Maccabi Tzur Shalom Bialik	20	3	1	16	16	91	−75	10	Relegated to Ligat Nashim Shniya

=== Top scorers ===
Rank	Scorer	Club	Goals
1	Silvi Jan	ASA Tel Aviv University	34
2	Shirley Ohana	Maccabi Holon	32
3	Sarit Shenar	ASA Tel Aviv University	22
4	Amana Abu Zaynab	Bnot Sakhnin	20
5	Nura Abu Shanab	Maccabi Kishronot Hadera	15
5	Marian Awad	Bnot Sakhnin	15
7	Meital Dayan	Maccabi Holon	12
7	Sheli Israel	ASA Tel Aviv University	12
9	Amira Arkiva	Hapoel Be'er Sheva	11
10	Tal Shino	Maccabi Holon	10
10	Dovrat Bendel	Hapoel Petah Tikva	10

== Ligat Nashim Shniya ==
Ligat Nashim Shniya
- Matches: 40
- Goals: 343 (8.58 per match)
- Top goalscorer: Michal Asaf (30)

=== League table ===
Pos	Team	Pld	W	D	L	GF	GA	GD	Pts	Promotion
1	F.C. Ramat HaSharon	16	15	1	0	134	14	+120	46	Promoted to Ligat Nashim Rishona
2	Maccabi Kfar Saba	16	11	1	4	110	33	+77	34	
3	F.C. Kiryat Gat	16	7	1	8	51	39	+12	22	
4	Bnot Caesarea Tiv'on	16	5	1	10	43	60	−17	16	
5	F.C. Kafr Yasif	16	0	0	16	5	197	−192	0	

=== Top scorers ===
Rank	Scorer	Club	Goals
1	Michal Asaf	Maccabi Kfar Saba	30
2	Maayan Kauffman	F.C. Ramat HaSharon	26
3	Walaa Hussein	F.C. Ramat HaSharon	18
4	Kristina Koruton	F.C. Ramat HaSharon	16
5	Liron Arbeitman	F.C. Ramat HaSharon	15
5	Noy Tzuberi	F.C. Ramat HaSharon	15
