= 2012–13 Ligat Nashim =

Ligat Nashim Rishona
- Season: 2012–13
- Matches: 80
- Goals: 390 (4.88 per match)
- Top goalscorer: Sarit Shenar (35)

The 2012–13 Ligat Nashim was the 15th season of women's league football under the Israeli Football Association.

The league was won by ASA Tel Aviv University, its fourth consecutive title and fifth overall. By winning, ASA Tel Aviv qualified to 2013–14 UEFA Women's Champions League.

Hapoel Be'er Sheva finished bottom of the first division and was relegated to the second division, and was replaced by second division winner, F.C. Kiryat Gat. The second-bottom club in the first division, Bnot Sakhnin met Maccabi Tzur Shalom Bialik for a spot in Ligat Nashim Rishona, Bnot Sakhnin winning 11–0 to remain in the first division.

== Ligat Nashim Rishona ==
=== Format changes ===
A promotion/relegation play-off was introduced, setting the second-bottom club in the first division's relegation group against the second-top club in the second division's promotion group.

=== Regular season ===
Pos	Team	Pld	W	D	L	GF	GA	GD	Pts	Qualification
1	ASA Tel Aviv University	14	14	0	0	66	3	+63	42	Championship Group
2	Maccabi Holon	14	9	1	4	43	18	+25	28	Championship Group
3	Maccabi Kishronot Hadera	14	7	3	4	32	25	+7	24	Championship Group
4	F.C. Ramat HaSharon	14	7	3	4	44	40	+4	24	Championship Group
5	Hapoel Ironi Petah Tikva	14	7	2	5	31	26	+5	23	Relegation Group
6	Maccabi Be'er Sheva	14	3	3	8	19	48	−29	12	Relegation Group
7	Bnot Sakhnin	14	2	1	11	17	38	−21	7	Relegation Group
8	Hapoel Be'er Sheva	14	0	1	13	18	72	−54	1	Relegation Group

=== Championship group ===
Pos	Team	Pld	W	D	L	GF	GA	GD	Pts	Qualification
1	ASA Tel Aviv University	20	19	0	1	91	9	+82	57	Qualified to UEFA Women's Champions League
2	Maccabi Holon	20	13	1	6	60	27	+33	40	
3	Maccabi Kishronot Hadera	20	9	4	7	39	36	+3	31	
4	F.C. Ramat HaSharon	20	7	4	9	49	68	−19	25	

=== Relegation group ===
Pos	Team	Pld	W	D	L	GF	GA	GD	Pts	Qualification or relegation
1	Hapoel Ironi Petah Tikva	20	13	2	5	57	36	+21	41	
2	Maccabi Be'er Sheva	20	5	4	11	27	65	−38	19	
3	Bnot Sakhnin	20	5	2	13	41	51	−10	17	Promotion play-offs
4	Hapoel Be'er Sheva	20	0	1	19	26	98	−72	1	Relegated to Ligat Nashim Shniya

==== Promotion/relegation play-off ====
5 May 2013	Bnot Sakhnin	11–0	Maccabi Tzur Shalom Bialik	Ilut Stadium
19:00	Nassar 5'; Salame 9', 22', 34'; Zubidat 12', 19', 49'; Sahikhian 24', 35'; Ibrahim 80', 85'	Report		Referee: Zvika Levi

=== Top scorers ===
Rank	Scorer	Club	Goals
1	(Israel) Sarit Shenar	ASA Tel Aviv University	35
2	(Israel) Dovrat Bendel	Hapoel Petah Tikva	30
3	(Nigeria) Chioma Nwabueze	F.C. Ramat HaSharon	18
4	(Israel) Shirley Ohana	Maccabi Holon	16
5	(Israel) Sivan Fahima	Maccabi Holon	14
5	(Israel) Arava Shahaf	Maccabi Be'er Sheva	14
7	(Israel) Lee Falkon	ASA Tel Aviv University	13
7	(Israel) Walaa Hussein	F.C. Ramat HaSharon	13
9	(Israel) Hanin Nasser	Maccabi Kishronot Hadera	12
10	Sheli Israel	ASA Tel Aviv University	11

== Ligat Nashim Shniya ==
Ligat Nashim Shniya
- Matches: 68
- Goals: 433 (6.37 per match)
- Top goalscorer: Michal Asaf; Dana Nisanboim (26)

=== Format changes ===
As 8 teams registered to the second division, the participating clubs first played a conventional double round-robin schedule for a total of 14 rounds, after which the 4 top clubs played a promotion play-off, while the bottom 4 clubs played a separate play-off, with clubs in each group playing a round-robin schedule of another 3 matches between them. Points earned in the regular season were kept by the clubs. The top club at the Promotion Group would win promotion to Ligat Nashim Rishona, and the second-placed club would compete in a promotion/relegation play-off against the third placed club in the first division's relegation group.

=== League table ===
Pos	Team	Pld	W	D	L	GF	GA	GD	Pts	Qualification
1	F.C. Kiryat Gat	14	14	0	0	100	3	+97	42	Championship Group
2	Maccabi Tzur Shalom Bialik	14	9	2	3	41	12	+29	29	Championship Group
3	Maccabi Kfar Saba	14	9	1	4	84	32	+52	28	Championship Group
4	Bnot Eilat	14	7	1	6	46	31	+15	22	Championship Group
5	Bnot Tiv'on	14	6	1	7	35	46	−11	19	Bottom Group
6	Bnot Caesarea	14	5	2	7	40	37	+3	17	Bottom Group
7	Beitar Ironi Ma'ale Adumim	14	2	0	12	10	109	−99	6	Bottom Group
8	F.C. Kafr Yasif	14	0	1	13	13	99	−86	1	Bottom Group

=== Championship group ===
Pos	Team	Pld	W	D	L	GF	GA	GD	Pts	Promotion or qualification
1	F.C. Kiryat Gat	17	16	1	0	113	7	+106	49	Promoted to Ligat Nashim Rishona
2	Maccabi Tzur Shalom Bialik	17	11	2	4	49	18	+31	35	Promotion play-offs
3	Maccabi Kfar Saba	17	9	3	5	88	39	+49	30	
4	Bnot Eilat	17	7	2	8	46	39	+7	23	

=== Bottom group ===
Pos	Team	Pld	W	D	L	GF	GA	GD	Pts
1	Bnot Caesarea	17	8	2	7	58	38	+20	26
2	Bnot Tiv'on	17	7	1	9	45	59	−14	22
3	F.C. Kafr Yasif	17	2	1	14	22	103	−81	7
4	Beitar Ironi Ma'ale Adumim	17	2	0	15	12	130	−118	6

=== Top scorers ===
Rank	Scorer	Club	Goals
1	Michal Asaf	Maccabi Kfar Saba	26
1	Dana Nisanboim	Bnot Caesarea	26
3	Tali Stolovitzky	Bnot Eilat	22
4	Yarin Asayag	Maccabi Tzur Shalom Bialik	20
5	Olga Truman	F.C. Kiryat Gat	18
