= 2009–10 Ligat Nashim =

Ligat Nashim
- Season: 2009–10
- Matches: 132
- Goals: 789 (5.98 per match)
- Top goalscorer: Shirley Ohana; Silvi Jan (47)

The 2009–10 Ligat Nashim was the 12th season of women's league football under the Israeli Football Association.

Two teams, ASA Tel Aviv University and Maccabi Kishronot Hadera topped the table with an equal number of points, and a play-off match was used to determine the champion, won 6–0 by ASA Tel Aviv University.

By winning, ASA Tel Aviv University qualified to 2010–11 UEFA Women's Champions League.

As the IFA decided to establish a second division for Ligat Nashim, the bottom four clubs were relegated at the end of the season.

== League table ==
Pos	Team	Pld	W	D	L	GF	GA	GD	Pts	Qualification or relegation
1	ASA Tel Aviv University	22	20	1	1	166	3	+163	61	Qualified to UEFA Women's Champions League
2	Maccabi Kishronot Hadera	22	20	1	1	130	11	+119	61	
3	Maccabi Holon	22	17	2	3	132	13	+119	53	
4	Bnot Sakhnin	22	13	2	7	92	33	+59	41	
5	Hapoel Ironi Petah Tikva	22	12	2	8	55	42	+13	38	
6	Maccabi Be'er Sheva	22	11	3	8	45	47	−2	36	
7	Hapoel Rishon LeZion	22	9	3	10	45	62	−17	30	
8	Maccabi Tzur Shalom Bialik	22	8	1	13	37	52	−15	25	
9	Hapoel Be'er Sheva	22	6	3	13	42	40	+2	21	Relegated to Ligat Nashim Shniya
10	Bnot Caesarea Tiv'on	22	2	3	17	21	99	−78	9	Relegated to Ligat Nashim Shniya
11	F.C. Ramat HaSharon	22	2	1	19	16	125	−109	5 (Note: 2 points deducted.)	Relegated to Ligat Nashim Shniya
12	Hapoel Marmorek	22	1	0	21	8	262	−254	3	Relegated to Ligat Nashim Shniya

== Top scorers ==
Rank	Scorer	Club	Goals
1	Shirley Ohana	Maccabi Holon	47
1	Silvi Jan	ASA Tel Aviv University	47
3	Adva Twil	Maccabi Kishronot Hadera	46
4	Nura Abu Shanab	Bnot Sakhnin	35
5	Levia Van Ouwerkerk	Maccabi Kishronot Hadera	25
6	Sarit Shenar	ASA Tel Aviv University	20
6	Shelly Israel	ASA Tel Aviv University	20
8	Hanin Nassar	Bnot Sakhnin	19
9	Lee Falkon	ASA Tel Aviv University	17
10	Liron Tayer	Hapoel Ironi Petah Tikva	16
