= 2003–04 Ligat Nashim =

Ligat Nashim
- Season: 2003–04
- Matches: 60
- Goals: 580 (9.67 per match)

The 2003–04 Ligat Nashim was to be the sixth season of women's league football under the Israeli Football Association. However, the league was interrupted after the clubs went on strike in protest over discrimination in budget allocation and financial difficulties. and although the league resumed after a month of strike, eventually the league was abandoned.

The season is also noticeable due to the inclusion of Ironi Ariel, who lost all of its matches without scoring a goal. The team worst defeat came of the hands of Maccabi Holon, 0–48 (initially given as a 0–50 loss), with striker Silvi Jan scoring 15 goals. The club also registered a 0–32 loss to ASA Tel Aviv University, with Meital Dayan scoring 17 goals.

== League table ==
The league was abandoned after playing the 11th round, which was due to be the last before the play-offs, involving the top 6 teams. At the time of abandonment, 6 regular season matches were still due to be completed.

Pos	Team	Pld	W	D	L	GF	GA	GD	Pts
1	Maccabi Holon	11	10	1	0	153	1	+152	31
2	ASA Tel Aviv University	10	9	1	0	103	2	+101	28
3	Hapoel Petah Tikva	11	8	0	3	80	16	+64	24
4	Hapoel Be'er Sheva	9	6	0	3	36	16	+20	18
5	Ironi Jerusalem	10	6	0	4	31	26	+5	18
6	Hapoel Marmorek	10	5	1	4	58	34	+24	16
7	Ironi Holon	11	4	1	6	34	47	−13	13
8	Beitar Be'er Sheva	9	3	1	5	26	34	−8	10
9	Ironi Bat Yam	10	3	1	6	33	47	−14	10
10	Bnot Sakhnin	9	2	0	7	12	45	−33	6
11	Ironi Tel Aviv	9	1	0	8	14	93	−79	3
12	Ironi Ariel	11	0	0	11	0	219	−219	0
