= Karin Peretz =

Israeli footballer

Karin Peretz קארין פרץ
Personal information
- Full name: Karin Peretz
- Date of birth: 7 October 1990 (age 36)
- Place of birth: Be'er Sheva, Israel
- Position: Forward

Team information
- Current team: Maccabi Be'er Sheva
- Number: 7

Senior career*
Years	Team	Apps	(Gls)
2006–	Maccabi Be'er Sheva	165	(74)

International career^{‡}
2007–2008	Israel U-19	5	(0)
- * Club domestic league appearances and goals ‡ National team caps and goals as of 15 December 2015

Karin Peretz (Hebrew: קארין פרץ; born 7 October 1990) is a former Israeli football forward. She played in the Israeli First League for Maccabi Be'er Sheva.

== Club career ==
Born in Be'er Sheva, Peretz played during her entire career with Maccabi Be'er Sheva, reaching the Israeli Women's Cup final in 2010 and winning the League's second division with the club in 2014–15, as well as finishing as top scorer in the second division at the same season. During summer 2015, Peretz had to have surgery in her knee, missing the beginning of the 2015–16 season.

== International career ==
Peretz played for the U-19 national team in 2007 and 2008, appearing in 5 matches.
