= Jaylin Bosak =

American soccer player

Personal information
- Full name: Jaylin Bosak
- Date of birth: January 7, 1998 (age 28)
- Height: 5 ft 8 in (1.73 m)
- Position: Defender

Team information
- Current team: Retired in 2023

Youth career
- 2012-16: Millard West High School

College career
Years	Team	Apps	(Gls)
2016–2019	Creighton University	69	(8)

Senior career*
Years	Team	Apps	(Gls)
2019–2021	Sporting Nebraska FC		
2021	Kuopion Palloseura		
2021–2022	Ramat HaSharon		
2022	Maccabi Kishronot Hadera		
2022	FF Yzeure Allier Auvergne		
2022-2023	Åland United		
- * Club domestic league appearances and goals

Jaylin Bosak (born January 7, 1998) is an American professional soccer player that retired in March 2023.

== Career ==
Bosak started her career as a soccer player at a young age in the clubs of her city.

Bosak attended Millard West High School in Omaha, Nebraska.

She was scouted by the Creighton University trained by the former American international Ross Paule.

She began her career under the orders of the American coach in 2016.

=== Young career ===
- 2016–2019: Creighton University Women's Team, Omaha (US)

=== Professional career ===
- 2019–2021: Sporting Nebraska FC, Omaha (United States)
- 2021 : Kuopion Palloseura, Kuopio (Finland)
- 2021–2022: F.C. Ramat HaSharon, Ramat HaSharon (Israel)
- 2022: Maccabi Kishronot Hadera F.C., Hadera (Israel)
- 2022: FF Yzeure Allier Auvergne, Yzeure (France)
- 2022-2023: Åland United, Lemland (Finland)

== Honors ==
- Best defender: 2018–2019
- Best defender: 2021–2022
- On the top 11 of Finland 2021
- Top 11 of the season
- Best defender of Winter Break 2022
