= Bnot Eilat F.C. =

Bnot Eilat
- Full name: Bnot Eilat Football Club בנות אילת
- Founded: 2010
- Ground: Rabin School Stadium, Eilat
- Manager: Ronen Shahrur
- League: Ligat Nashim Shniya
- 2014–15: 5th

Bnot Eilat (Hebrew: בנות אילת) is an Israeli women's football club from Eilat competing in the Israeli Second League and the Israeli Women's Cup.

== History ==
The club was established in 2010 by footballer Ann Levy and entered the league's second division in 2012. The club qualified to the promotion group of the league, but finished fourth. The next season the club missed on promotion once again, as it finished third in the league.

In the cup, the club is yet to win a game. In its first season the club competed in the Second Division League Cup, and was beaten 0–1 by F.C. Kafr Yasif. The club entered the main competition the next season, and was beaten 0–17 by top division’s Maccabi Kishronot Hadera, the club's worst defeat ever. In the 2014–15 competition the club met Maccabi Be'er Sheva in the first round, and was beaten 0–6.

== 2014-15 squad ==
Note: Flags indicate national team as defined under FIFA eligibility rules; some limited exceptions apply. Players may hold more than one non-FIFA nationality.

No.	Pos.	Nation	Player
1		ISR	Tali Lupo
2		ISR	Hen Swisa
3		ISR	Eti Bitton
4		ISR	Tamara Sosnitsky
6		ISR	Hagar Shtar
7		ISR	Almog Menashko
8		ISR	Tali Stolovitski
9		ISR	Ann Levy

No.	Pos.	Nation	Player
10		ISR	Ruth Landesman
12		ISR	Iren Dahan
14		ISR	Odelia Mezamber
15		ISR	Adi Mizrachi
16		ISR	Reut Elbaz
18		ISR	Yuval Edri
20		ISR	Nof Malka
81		ISR	Ravit Daud
