= Maia Cabrera =

Dominican footballer (born 1999)

Maia Cabrera מאיה קבררה
Personal information
- Full name: Maia Nedara Cabrera Mamann מאיה נדרה קבררה
- Date of birth: 17 July 1999 (age 27)
- Place of birth: Rego Park, Queens, New York, United States
- Height: 1.70 m (5 ft 7 in)
- Position: Midfielder

Team information
- Current team: Maccabi Kishronot Hadera

College career
Years	Team	Apps	(Gls)
2017–2021	St. John's Red Storm	81	(6)

Senior career*
Years	Team	Apps	(Gls)
2018	Long Island Fury		
2021–202?	SUSA FC		
2024–	Maccabi Kishronot Hadera	61	(26)

International career^{‡}
2015–2018	Israel U19	10	(2)
2021–2022	Dominican Republic	2	(0)
2025–	Israel	11	(0)
- * Club domestic league appearances and goals as of 11 October 2026 ‡ National team caps and goals as of 15 October 2026

Maia Nedara Cabrera Mamann (Hebrew: מאיה קבררה; born 17 July 1999) is a footballer who plays as a midfielder for Ligat Nashim club Maccabi Kishronot Hadera. Born in the United States, she capped for Israel and the Dominican Republic at international under-19 and senior levels, respectively. In 2025, she made her debut for the Israel national side making her one of the few footballers who have played for more than one country

== Early life ==
Cabrera was raised in Rego Park, New York to a Dominican father and an Israeli mother. She is Jewish.

== High school and college career ==
Cabrera attended Solomon Schechter School of Queens for elementary and middle school and went on to Forest Hills High School in Forest Hills, New York and the St. John's University in New York City, New York.

== Club career ==
Cabrera has played for Long Island Fury and SUSA FC in the Women's Premier Soccer League.

== International career ==
=== Israel U19 ===
Cabrera represented Israel at the 2015 UEFA Women's Under-19 Championship and three UEFA Women's Under-19 Championship qualifications (2016, 2017 and 2018).

=== Dominican Republic ===
She made her senior debut for the Dominican Republic on 7 July 2021 as a 58th-minute substitution in a 0–1 friendly loss to Nicaragua. Cabrera appeared at the 2022 CONCACAF W Championship qualification, playing against Bermuda on 9 April 2022. Since it was an official match and she was 22 years old at the time, she became cap-tied to the Dominican Republic.

=== Israel ===
Cabrera made her debut for Israel in February 2025 against Bulgaria.

=== Controversy ===
Cabrera has played official matches for Israel U19, the Dominican Republic and Israel, in that order. Since footballers can only apply for one FIFA change of association in their entire career, this means that Cabrera was an ineligible player for the Dominican Republic or Israel at senior level, depending on if she had received or not clearance by FIFA to represent the Dominican Republic.
