= Beitar Ironi Ma'ale Adumim F.C. (women) =

Beitar Ironi Ma'ale Adumim
- Full name: Beitar Ironi Ma'ale Adumim Women's Football Club בית"ר עירוני מעלה אדומים נשים
- Founded: 2012
- Dissolved: 2013
- Ground: Municipal Stadium
- League: Ligat Nashim Shniya
- 2012–13: 8th

Beitar Ironi Ma'ale Adumim (Hebrew: בית"ר עירוני מעלה אדומים) was an Israeli women's football club from Ma'ale Adumim who competed in the Israeli Second Division and the Ligat Nashim Shniya Cup. The club existed for one season only before folding.

== History ==
The club was established in 2012 and joined Ligat Nashim, entering in the second division. The club won just two matches during the season, both against fellow bottom table strugglers, F.C. Kafr Yasif and lost the rest of the matches, to finish bottom of the table. The club competed in the Second Division Cup, as in this season, the Israeli Women's Cup was contested by the top division's teams only. The club played Bnot Tiv'on in the cup's quarter-finals, and lost on penalties.
