= F.C. Kafr Yasif (women) =

- Full name: Sport Club Kafr Yasif מועדון ספורט כפר יאסיף
- Founded: 2011
- Dissolved: 2014
- Ground: Kafr Yasif
- Capacity: 2000
- Manager: Munir Mohammad
- League: Ligat Nashim Shniya
- 2013–14 Ligat Nashim Shniya: 6th

F.C. Kafr Yasif (Arabic: كفر ياسيف, Hebrew: מועדון ספורט כפר יאסיף) was an Arab-Israeli women's football club from Kafr Yasif, who competed in the Israeli Second Division, the Israeli Women's Cup and the second division league cup. The club existed for three seasons only before folding.

== History ==
The club was established in 2011 and joined Ligat Nashim, entering in the second division. The club lost all of its matches in its first season, both in the league and in the cups. The next season the club won two league matches (one, against Bnot Caesarea Tiv'on, a walkover) and won a match in the second division league cup, advancing to the cup's semi-finals, where its lost 0–12 to F.C. Kiryat Gat. In its next season the club once again lost all of its matches, and folded at the end of the season.
