= Arava Shahaf =

Israeli footballer

Arava Shahaf ערבה שחף
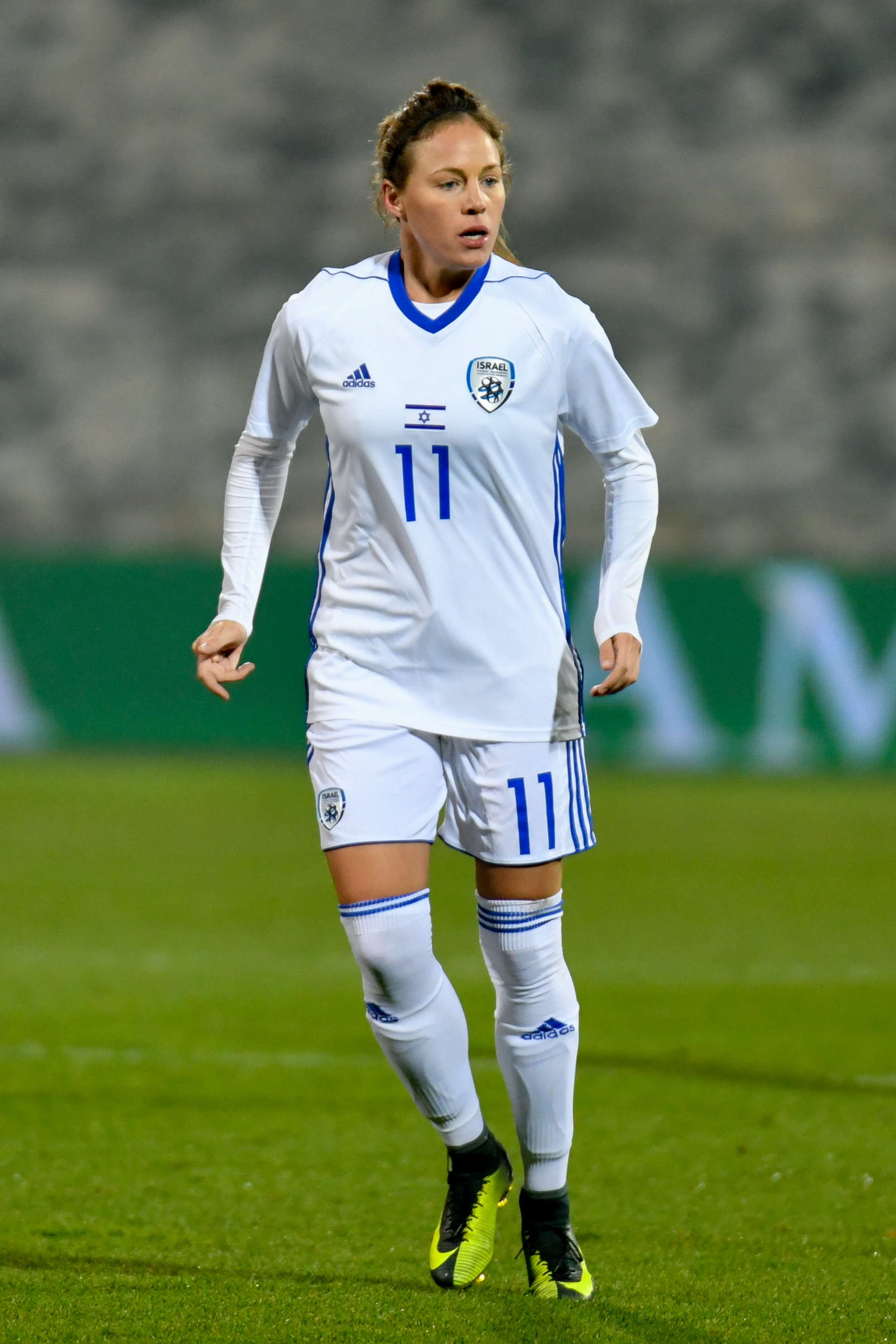

Personal information
- Full name: Arava Shahaf
- Date of birth: 28 April 1990 (age 36)
- Place of birth: Be'er Sheva, Israel
- Position: Forward

Team information
- Current team: F.C. Ramat HaSharon
- Number: 17

Senior career*
Years	Team	Apps	(Gls)
2006–2013	Maccabi Be'er Sheva	120	(63)
2013–	→ F.C. Ramat HaSharon (loan)	43	(32)
2014	→ ASA Tel Aviv University (loan)	0	(0)

International career^{‡}
2007	Israel U-19	1	(0)
2013–2018	Israel	30	(3)
- * Club domestic league appearances and goals ‡ National team caps and goals as of 6 December 2021

Arava Shahaf (or Schahaf, Hebrew: ערבה שחף; born 28 April 1990) is an Israeli football forward, currently playing in the Israeli First League for F.C. Ramat HaSharon (on loan). Shahaf has been a member of the Israeli national team since 2013, when she made her debut against Malta.

== Club career ==
Born in Be'er Sheva, Shahaf joined Maccabi Be'er Sheva at the age of 15, making her debut on 12 December 2006 against ASA Tel Aviv University. She played with the club until the beginning of the 2013–14 season, when she was loaned to F.C. Ramat HaSharon, to which she was loaned ever since. On 17 November 2015, in a match against her old club, Shahaf scored her 100th league goal. Shahaf was also loaned for a brief period to ASA Tel Aviv University and played with the club in the 2014–15 Champions League qualifying round, getting sent off against Atlético Ouriense.

== International career ==
Shahf made her international debut with the Israel women's national football team at the age of 23, in a match against Malta, and as of December 2015, played 10 matches for the national team. Shahaf also played a single match for the U-19 national team in 2007, in a 1–5 loss to Italy.
