= Adva Twil =

Israeli footballer

Adva Twil אדווה טוויל
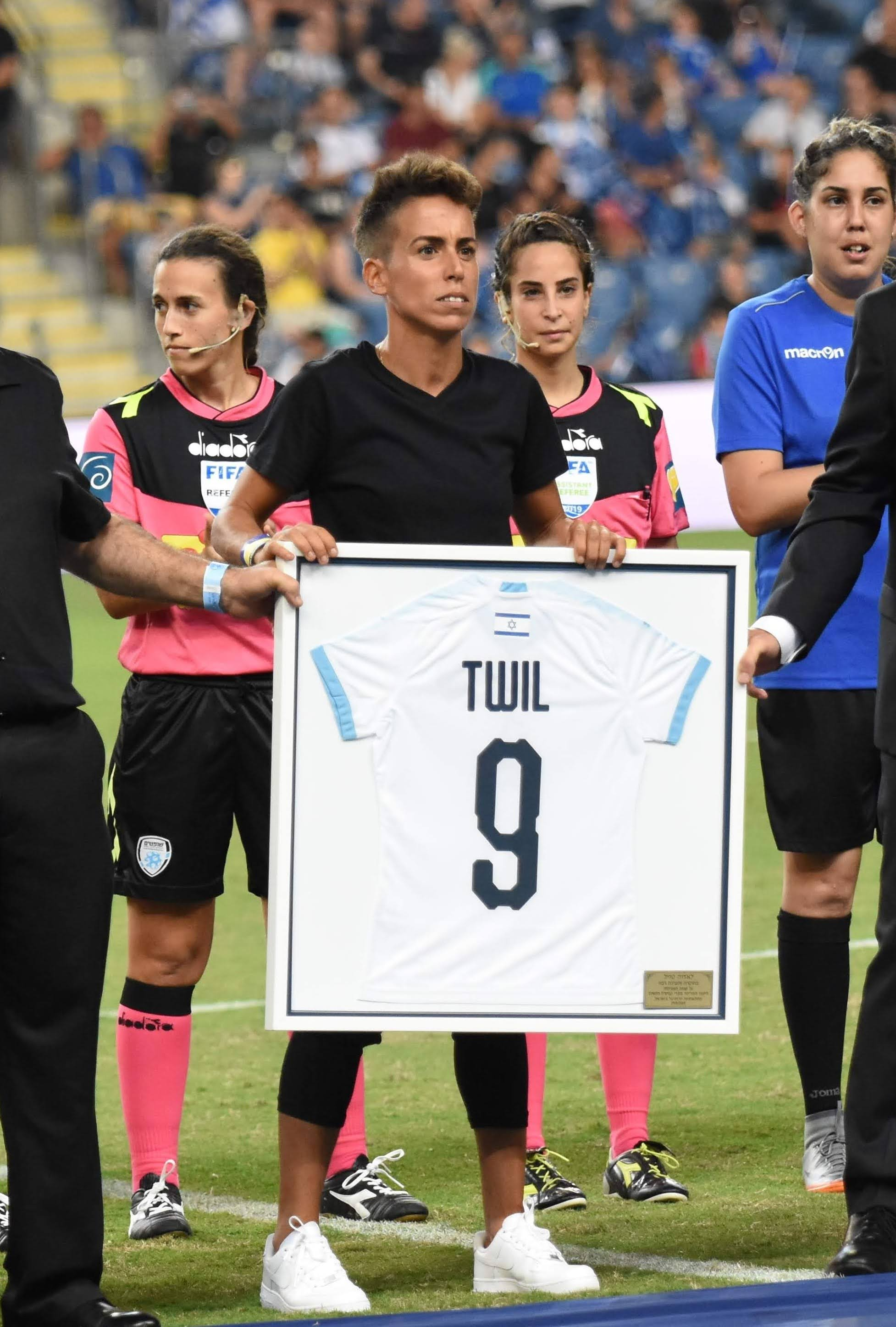

Personal information
- Date of birth: 26 June 1985 (age 41)
- Place of birth: Yeruham, Israel
- Position: Forward

Team information
- Current team: F.C. Ramat HaSharon
- Number: 20

Senior career*
Years	Team	Apps	(Gls)
2000–2002	Beitar Be'er Sheva		
2002–2003	Hapoel Be'er Sheva		
2003–2004	Maccabi Holon		
2004–2005	Ironi Jerusalem		
2005–2006	F.C. Ramat HaSharon		
2006–2007	Maccabi Holon		
2006–2007	→ F.C. Ramat HaSharon (loan)		
2007–2009	F.C. Ramat HaSharon	24	(37)
2008	→ ASA Tel Aviv University (loan)	9	(9)
2009–	Maccabi Kishronot Hadera	80	(87)
2011–2013	→ Maccabi Holon (loan)	36	(7)
2015–	→ F.C. Ramat HaSharon (loan)		

International career^{‡}
2003	Israel U-19	3	(0)
2008–2018	Israel	48	(0)
- * Club domestic league appearances and goals as of 7 December 2021 ‡ National team caps and goals as of 8 September 2016

Adva Twil (or Tvil/Tuil, Hebrew: אדווה טוויל; born 26 June 1985) is an Israeli football forward.

== Club career ==
Twil had played in the Israeli First League since she was 15, starting in Beitar Be'er Sheva, before moving to play for Maccabi Holon, F.C. Ramat HaSharon and Maccabi Kishronot Hadera, where she had played since 2009. In 2015, Twil was loaned to F.C. Ramat HaSharon. During her club career, Twil won 2 national cups and played in the UEFA Women's Champions League with Maccabi Holon in 2003.

== International career ==
Twil played for the national team since 2008, appearing in 30 matches. Previously, in 2003, Twil played for the U-19 national team, appearing in 3 matches.

== Honours ==
- Cup (2):
  - With Maccabi Holon: 2012–13
  - With Maccabi Kishronot Hadera: 2014–15
