= Sarit Shenar =

Israeli footballer

Sarit Shenar שרית שנער
Personal information
- Full name: Sarit Shenar
- Date of birth: 9 June 1983 (age 43)
- Place of birth: Israel
- Position: Midfielder

Team information
- Current team: ASA Tel Aviv University
- Number: 7

College career
Years	Team	Apps	(Gls)
2003–2006	West Texas A&M Buffaloes		(72)

Senior career*
Years	Team	Apps	(Gls)
1998	Hapoel Ashkelon		
1999–2003	ASA Tel Aviv University		
2003–2006	Maccabi Holon	8	(2)
2007–2008	Hamburger SV	17	(0)
2008–2009	SønderjyskE		(4)
2009–	ASA Tel Aviv	108	(141)

International career^{‡}
2001	Israel U19	6	(6)
2000–2012	Israel	39	(14)
- * Club domestic league appearances and goals ‡ National team caps and goals as of 3 January 2015

Sarit Shenar (Hebrew: שרית שנער; born 9 June 1983) is an Israeli football midfielder, currently playing in the Israeli First League for ASA Tel Aviv University. She had also played for in the U.S., Germany and Denmark. She had played in the Champions League with Maccabi Holon and ASA Tel Aviv, and she has been a member of the Israeli national team since 2000, when she made her debut against Belarus.

== Club career ==
Shenar started playing with a boys’ team in Kiryat Gat, but was barred from playing upon reaching 12. At the age of 15 she had joined the newly formed Hapoel Ashkelon, and moved shortly afterwards to ASA Tel Aviv University. In 2003, after completing her military service, Shenar began attending West Texas A&M University, where she played for the Lady Buffs for the next four years, scoring 72 goals. During the same period Shenar also played for Maccabi Holon in the UEFA Women's Champions League

Shenar played with the Lady Buffs until 2007, after which she applied for positions with a host of European clubs, finally signing with Hamburger SV, with whom she played for a year. The following season Shenar signed with SønderjyskE, where she played until January 2009, netting four goals, before she decided to return to Israel due to her mother’s illness. Shenar transferred to ASA Tel Aviv University, with which she played ever since, winning 5 Israeli championships and 3 cups, as well as twice being the league’s top scorer.

== Management career ==
In 2013, Shenar founded, together with Shelly Israel a women’s football team, Bnot Netanya, and Shenar served as head coach for the team for the 2013–14 season,

== International career ==
Shenar made her international debut in the Israel women's national football team at the age of 14, in a match against Belarus. In total, Shenar played 39 matches for the national team and is the most capped in the team. Shenar scored 14 matches for the national team and is the team’s second best scorer, after Silvi Jan.

Shenar also played for the U-19 national team, making 6 appearances in 2001, during the 2002 UEFA Women's Under-19 Championship qualifying campaign. Shenar scored 6 goals in the campaign, and is the U-19 team top scorer.

== International goals ==
No.	Date	Venue	Opponent	Score	Result	Competition
1.	6 September 2001	Tallinn, Estonia	Estonia	2–0	5–2	2003 FIFA Women's World Cup qualification
2.	4 June 2002	Kyiv, Ukraine	Estonia	3–0	3–0	2003 FIFA Women's World Cup qualification
3.	10 March 2003	Pärnu, Estonia	Estonia	4–1	4–1	UEFA Women's Euro 2005 qualifying
4.	21 August 2005	Pärnu, Estonia	Estonia	5–2	5–2	2007 FIFA Women's World Cup qualification
5.	18 November 2006	Sarajevo, Bosnia and Herzegovina	Latvia	3–0	3–0	UEFA Women's Euro 2009 qualifying
6.	20 November 2006	Sarajevo, Bosnia and Herzegovina	Armenia	1–0	1–0	UEFA Women's Euro 2009 qualifying
7.	23 November 2006	Sarajevo, Bosnia and Herzegovina	Bosnia and Herzegovina	2–0	5–2	UEFA Women's Euro 2009 qualifying
8.	23 November 2006	Sarajevo, Bosnia and Herzegovina	Bosnia and Herzegovina	3–1	5–2	UEFA Women's Euro 2009 qualifying
9.	23 November 2006	Sarajevo, Bosnia and Herzegovina	Bosnia and Herzegovina	4–2	5–2	UEFA Women's Euro 2009 qualifying
10.	23 November 2006	Sarajevo, Bosnia and Herzegovina	Bosnia and Herzegovina	5–2	5–2	UEFA Women's Euro 2009 qualifying

== Honours ==
- Championships (5):
  - 2009–10, 2010–11, 2011–12, 2012–13, 2013–14
- Cup (3):
  - 2010–11, 2011–12, 2013–14

=== Individual ===
- Top Goalscorer (Israeli Women's League)(2):
  - 2012–13 (35 goals)
  - 2013–14 (28 goals)
