= Bnot Caesarea Tiv'on F.C. =

Bnot Caesarea Tiv'on
- Full name: Bnot Caesarea Tiv'on Football Club קיסריה טבעון
- Founded: 2002 (as Ironi Holon); 2005 (as Bnot Tiv'on); 2006 (as Bnot Caesarea Tiv'on)
- Ground: Kiryat Tiv'on Stadium
- League: Ligat Nashim
- 2012–13 Ligat Nashim Shniya: 5th (as Bnot Caesarea); 6th (as Bnot Tiv'on)

Bnot Caesarea Tiv'on (Hebrew: בנות קיסריה טבעון) was an Israeli women's football club from Kiryat Tiv'on and Caesarea, who competed in the Israeli Second League and the Israeli Women's Cup.

== History ==
The club was originally established in 2002 as Ironi Holon (Hebrew: עירוני חולון) and played its home matches in Holon, before relocating to Kiryat Tiv'on at the beginning of the 2004–05 season and playing under the name Bnot Tiv'on (Hebrew: בנות טבעון). Before the following season, the club was renamed Bnot Caesarea Tiv'on, while continuing to play in Kiryat Tiv'on. The same season the club finished fourth in the Northern division of the league and qualified to the championship group, eventually finishing 6th, its best league position. In the following seasons the club struggled in the bottom of the league, and at the end of the 2009–10 season was relegated to the newly formed second division. However, the club failed to show to its first matches, and was thrown out of the league.

In 2012 the club was split into two teams, Bnot Tiv'on, under management from Kiryat Tiv'on, and Bnot Caesarea (Hebrew: בנות קיסריה), under the former management, joined by footballer Shelly Israel. The two teams played in the second division, and finished 6th and 5th, respectively. At the end of the season, following a dispute between Shelly Israel and Bnot Caesarea co-owner, Ran Ben Basat, Israel quit the club, and the two club merged again to re-form Bnot Caesarea Tiv'on. The club played 8 matches in the second division and folded.

In the Israeli Women's Cup the club never won a match, except for a walkover win over Bnot Beit She'an, and never reached more than the quarter-finals. The club also played in the second division cup and reached the final in both 2012 and 2013 (as Bnot Tiv'on), and twice lost in the final.

== Seasons ==
| Season | Club Name | League | | | | | | | | | Cup | 2nd Div. Cup | Coach |
| Season | Club Name | Division | P | W | D | L | F | A | Pts | Pos | Cup | 2nd Div. Cup | Coach |
|---|---|---|---|---|---|---|---|---|---|---|---|---|---|
| 2002–03 | Ironi Holon | Ligat Nashim; North | 13 | 3 | 0 | 10 | 17 | 54 | 9 | 5th | quarter-finals | – | n/a |
| 2003–04 | Ironi Holon | Ligat Nashim | 11 | 4 | 1 | 6 | 34 | 47 | 13 | 7th | quarter-finals | – | n/a |
| 2004–05 | Bnot Tiv'on | Ligat Nashim; North | 8 | 4 | 0 | 4 | 44 | 18 | 12 | 5th | 1st round | – | n/a |
| 2004–05 | Bnot Tiv'on | Bottom group | 10 | 8 | 0 | 2 | 72 | 11 | 24 | 3rd | 1st round | – | n/a |
| 2005–06 | Bnot Caesarea Tiv'on | Ligat Nashim; North | 8 | 4 | 1 | 3 | 22 | 26 | 13 | 4th | n/a | – | n/a |
| 2005–06 | Bnot Caesarea Tiv'on | Champ. group | 14 | 4 | 0 | 10 | 33 | 58 | 12 | 6th | n/a | – | n/a |
| 2006–07 | Bnot Caesarea Tiv'on | 1st Div. | 22 | 5 | 4 | 13 | 21 | 83 | 19 | 9th | quarter-finals | – | n/a |
| 2007–08 | Bnot Caesarea Tiv'on | Ligat Nashim | 22 | 6 | 4 | 12 | 38 | 58 | 22 | 9th | 1st round | – | n/a |
| 2008–09 | Bnot Caesarea Tiv'on | Ligat Nashim | 22 | 2 | 3 | 17 | 34 | 99 | 9 | 11th | quarter-finals | – | Rami Rahamim |
| 2009–10 | Bnot Caesarea Tiv'on | Ligat Nashim | 22 | 2 | 3 | 17 | 21 | 99 | 9 | 10th | 1st round | – | Avishai Rosenfeld |
| 2010–11 | Bnot Caesarea Tiv'on | 2nd Div. | – | – | – | – | – | – | – | – | – | – | Avishai Rosenfeld |
| 2011–12 | Bnot Caesarea Tiv'on | 2nd Div. | 16 | 5 | 1 | 10 | 43 | 60 | 16 | 4th | – | final | Shahar Cohen |
| 2012–13 | Bnot Tiv'on | 2nd Div. | 17 | 7 | 1 | 9 | 45 | 59 | 22 | 6th | – | final | Eyal Ben Baruch |
| 2012–13 | Bnot Caesarea | 2nd Div. | 17 | 8 | 2 | 7 | 58 | 38 | 26 | 5th | – | quarter-finals | Ran Ben Basat |
| 2013–14 | Bnot Caesarea Tiv'on | 2nd Div. | 8 | 2 | 1 | 5 | 16 | 24 | 7 | – | quarter-finals | – | Ran Ben Basat |
