= Maccabi Tzur Shalom Bialik F.C. =

Maccabi Tzur Shalom Bialik
- Full name: Maccabi Tzur Shalom Bialik Football Club מכבי צור שלום ביאליק
- Founded: 2005
- Ground: Hapoel Stadium, Kiryat Bialik
- Capacity: 2000
- Manager: David Ganon
- League: Ligat Nashim Rishona
- 2014–15: 9th

Maccabi Tzur Shalom Bialik (Hebrew: מכבי צור שלום ביאליק) is an Israeli women's football club from Kiryat Bialik competing in the Israeli First League and the Israeli Women's Cup.

== History ==
The club was established in 2005 and played most of its seasons in the league's first division, achieving its best placing, 5th, in 2008–09, before dropping to the second division at the end of the 2011–12 season. In its first season in the second division, the club finished as runners-up and faced Bnot Sakhnin in a promotion/relegation play-off, but lost 0–11 and remained in the second division. The following season, the club won the second division and was promoted to the first division. However, the club didn't fare well in the top division, losing all its matches and scoring just three goals, and relegated back to the second division.

The club also competes in the Israeli Women's Cup, but never reached more than the quarter-finals. The club reached the semi-final of the Second Division League Cup in 2012–13, but lost to Bnot Caesarea Tiv'on.

== Titles ==
- Israeli 2nd Division (1)
  - 2013–14

== 2014-15 squad ==
Note: Flags indicate national team as defined under FIFA eligibility rules; some limited exceptions apply. Players may hold more than one non-FIFA nationality.

No.	Pos.	Nation	Player
2		ISR	Talya Noam
3		ISR	Mor Sasoni
5		ISR	Tegan Gaddie
6		ISR	Sarit Baranes
7		ISR	Ronza Jeries
8		ISR	Orel Feiger
10		ISR	Yarin Asayag
11		ISR	Hila Ronen
12		ISR	Revital Levin
14		ISR	Dana Frank
15		ISR	Marganit Hinga

No.	Pos.	Nation	Player
17		ISR	Samara Adada
18		ISR	Yarden Kricheli
19		ISR	Sandra Bagirov
20		ISR	Maya Jeries
21		ISR	Yusar Faisal
22		ISR	Moran Lugasi
23		ISR	Loren Kaufmann
24		ISR	Meira Yusov
26		ISR	Nofar Zaguri
—		ISR	Moran Amar
