= Bnot Sakhnin F.C. =

- Full name: Bnot Sakhnin Football Club בנות סכנין
- Founded: 1999
- Ground: Doha Stadium, Sakhnin
- Capacity: 8,500
- Chairman: Ataf Amar
- Manager: Zahi Alian
- League: Ligat Nashim
- 2014–15: 6th

Bnot Sakhnin (Hebrew: בנות סכנין, Arabic: بنات سخنين) is an Arab-Israeli women's football club from Sakhnin competing in the Israeli First League and the Israeli Women's Cup.

== History ==
The club was established in 1999 as a youth club, and in 2002 joined the senior league., reaching their best placing, 4th, in 2009–10. The club twice, in 2013 and 2014 finished second bottom of the first division and had to play a promotion/relegation play-off match against the second division's runners-up, twice winning and retaining its first division status.

In the cup, the club's best achievement is reaching the semi-finals in 2010, losing 1–2 to Maccabi Be’er Sheva, and in 2012, losing 0–5 to ASA Tel Aviv University.

== Youth teams ==
The club operates a u-19 and u-16 teams, which had won several titles, the u-19 team won the state championship and the u-19 state cup in 2013–14, as well as regional league titles in 2009 and 2011, while the u-16 team won the state championship and the u-16 state cup in 2011–12 and 2012–13.
