= F.C. Kiryat Gat (women) =

- Full name: Kiryat Gat Sport Club מועדון ספורט קריית גת
- Founded: 2010
- Ground: Rogozin Synthetic grass pitch, Kiryat Gat
- Chairman: Moshe Sabag
- Manager: Eyal Sade
- League: Women's Premier League
- 2024–25: Champions

F.C. Kiryat Gat (Hebrew: מועדון ספורט קריית גת) is an Israeli women's football club from Kiryat Gat competing in the Israeli First League and the Israeli Women's Cup.

== History ==
The club is a second attempt in operating a women's football team in Kiryat Gat, after a previous team, named Bnot Kiryat Gat, existed between 2005 and 2007, closing down after its players were bought by Maccabi Be'er Sheva.

The current club was established in 2010, relying mostly on local players, and was registered to Ligat Nashim second division, where it played for three seasons, before being promoted at the end of the 2012–13 Season. The club also won the Second Division League Cup in the same season, beating Bnot Caesarea Tivon 4–0 in the final. In 2014–15 the club was one of three in a threeway race to the championship, eventually finishing as runners-up to league champions ASA Tel Aviv University.

== Honours ==
Israeli Premier League (7)

- 2016–17, 2017–18, 2020–21, 2021–22, 2022–2023, 2023–24, 2024–25

Israeli 2nd Division (1)

- 2012–13

Second Division League Cup (1)

- 2012–13
