= Maccabi Be'er Sheva F.C. (women) =

Maccabi Be'er Sheva
- Full name: Maccabi Be'er Sheva Lee Football Club מועדון כדורגל מכבי באר שבע לי
- Founded: 2004
- Ground: Neve Noy Stadium, Be'er Sheva
- Chairman: Esther Yona
- Manager: Moshe Nir
- League: Ligat Nashim Shniya
- 2014–15: 1st

Maccabi Be'er Sheva (Hebrew: מכבי באר שבע - לי) is an Israeli women's football club from Be'er Sheva competing in the Israeli women's league and the Israeli Women's Cup.

== History ==
The club was established in 2004 and first competed in Ligat Nashim in 2004–05, which then consisted of one tier only. The club came close to relegation from the first division at the end of the 2006–07 season, in which the club finished second from bottom. However, during the season break, three of the five second division clubs folded, and, in order to ensure its first division status, the club bought out Bnot Kiryat Gat, and remained in the first division, which once again became the only tier of the league.

The club kept its first division status until the end of 2013–14 season, twice reaching 4th, its best placing, during this period (in 2010–11 and 2011–12. In 2014 the club finished bottom of the first division and dropped to the second division. However, the club bounced back as it won the second division the following season and was promoted back to the top division.

In the Israeli Women's Cup, the club reached the cup final in 2010, overcoming local rivals Hapoel Be'er Sheva and Bnot Sakhnin, before losing in the final itself 0–5 to Maccabi Holon The club reached the cup semi-finals twice more, in 2006–07 and 2010–11, in both times losing to Maccabi Holon.

== Titles ==
- Ligat Nashim Shniya (1):
  - 2014–15

Runners-up:

- Israeli Women's Cup (1)
  - 2010
