= Maccabi Kishronot Hadera F.C. =

Maccabi Kishronot Hadera
- Full name: Maccabi Kishronot Hadera Football Club מכבי כשרונות חדרה
- Founded: 2004
- Ground: Hapoel Stadium, Hadera
- Chairman: Ya'akov Glam
- Manager: Gabriel Burstein
- League: Ligat Nashim
- 2024–25: 3rd
Home colours	Away colours

Maccabi Kishronot Hadera (Hebrew: מכבי כשרונות חדרה) is an Israeli women's football club from Hadera competing in the Israeli First Division and the Israeli Women's Cup.

== History ==
The club was established in 2004, and played ever since in the Israeli first division, never finishing below 3rd in the league, twice finishing as runners-up. In 2009–10 the club finished as runners-up and level on points with league leaders, ASA Tel Aviv University and competed in a play-off match for the championship, losing 0–6.

In the cup, the club appeared in two finals, in 2011–12 and 2013–14, losing both finals to ASA Tel Aviv University. In 2014–15 the two teams met again in the final, with the club winning 1–0 to earn its first trophy.

In 2010–11, the club operated a B team, who played in the 2nd division. The B team finished as runners-up in the league, losing to Maccabi Tzur Shalom Bialik in a promotion/relegation play-off match 0–2, and lost to Hapoel Be'er Sheva 1–7 in the 2nd Division League Cup final.

== Titles ==
=== Maccabi Kishronot Hadera ===
Winners:

- Israeli Cup (1)
  - 2014–15,

Runners-up:

- Israeli 1st Division (2)
  - 2009–10, 2013–14
- Israeli Cup (2)
  - 2011–12, 2013–14

=== Maccabi Kishronot Hadera B ===
Runners-up:

- Israeli 2nd Division (1)
  - 2010–11
- Ligat Nashim Shniya Cup (1)
  - 2010–11 (as Maccabi Kishronot Hadera B)

== Players ==
As of 7 November 2024

=== Current squad ===
Note: Flags indicate national team as defined under FIFA eligibility rules; some limited exceptions apply. Players may hold more than one non-FIFA nationality.

No.	Pos.	Nation	Player
1	GK	ISR	Marom Keren
3	MF	GHA	Rebecca Atinga
4	DF	ISR	Emmanuel Avrahami (captain)
6	MF	DOM	Maia Cabrera
7	MF	USA	Ruvimbo Mucherera
8	DF	ISR	Shani David

No.	Pos.	Nation	Player
10	MF	BRA	Erikinha
16	MF	ISR	Zohar Gat
18	FW	ISR	Hodaya Biton
19	DF	ISR	Hen Elhadad
20	FW	BRA	Laysla Santos Cruz
22	DF	USA	Gianna Merigliano

=== Reserve team and Youth Academy ===
Note: Flags indicate national team as defined under FIFA eligibility rules; some limited exceptions apply. Players may hold more than one non-FIFA nationality.

No.	Pos.	Nation	Player
9	MF	ISR	Shay Elmaleh
12	FW	ISR	Sofia Vodolazov
13		ISR	Diana Kostiuchenko
14	MF	ISR	Noga Bernshtein

No.	Pos.	Nation	Player
16	MF	ISR	Marom Abo
21		ISR	Ori Tal
23		ISR	Sofia Orishenko
31		ISR	Danielle Cibaxs
