= Israel women's national under-19 football team =

National association football team

Israel Women's U-19
- Association: Israel Football Association
- Confederation: UEFA (Europe)
- Head coach: Shlomi Dora
- Most caps: Lee Falkon (17)
- Top scorer: Sarit Shenar (6)
- FIFA code: ISR
| First colours | Second colours |

UEFA Women's Under-19 Championship
- Appearances: 1 (first in 2015)

FIFA U-20 Women's World Cup
- Appearances: 0

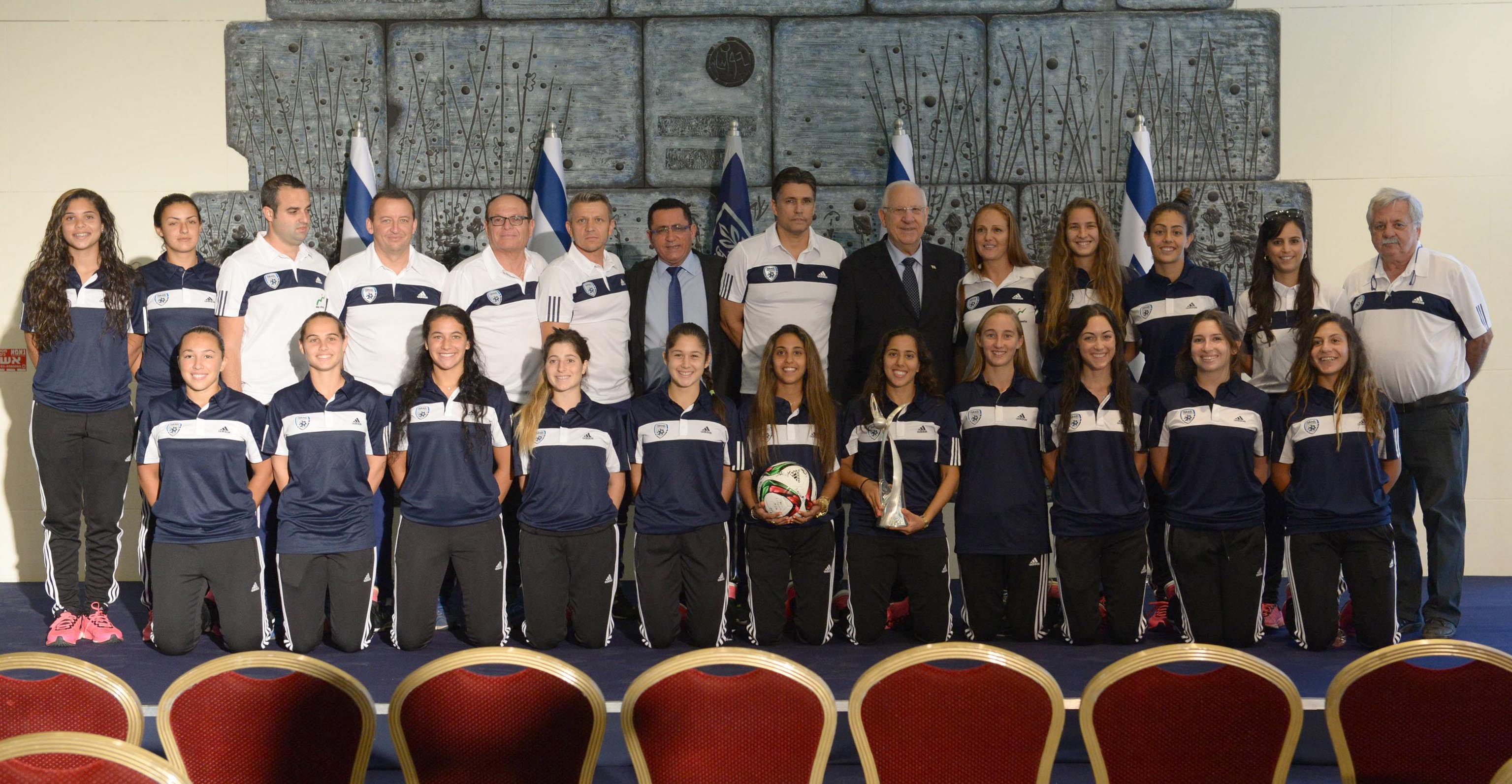
The Israel women's national under-19 football team in 2015. In the background is an Israeli basalt relief.

Israel women's national under-19 football team is the football team representing Israel in competitions for under-19 year old players and is controlled by the Israel Football Association. The team hosted the 2015 UEFA Women's Under-19 Championship, making its first appearance in a major tournament.

== Competitive record ==
=== UEFA Women's Under-19 Championship ===
| Year | Result | MP | W | D | L | GF | GA |
|---|---|---|---|---|---|---|---|
| 1998 | did not qualify | | | | | | |
| (Sweden) 1999 | did not qualify | | | | | | |
| (France) 2000 | did not qualify | | | | | | |
| (Norway) 2001 | did not qualify | | | | | | |
| (Sweden) 2002 | did not qualify | | | | | | |
| (Germany) 2003 | did not qualify | | | | | | |
| (Finland) 2004 | did not qualify | | | | | | |
| (Hungary) 2005 | did not qualify | | | | | | |
| (Switzerland) 2006 | did not qualify | | | | | | |
| (Iceland) 2007 | did not qualify | | | | | | |
| (France) 2008 | did not qualify | | | | | | |
| (Belarus) 2009 | did not qualify | | | | | | |
| (North Macedonia) 2010 | did not qualify | | | | | | |
| (Italy) 2011 | did not qualify | | | | | | |
| (Turkey) 2012 | did not qualify | | | | | | |
| (Wales) 2013 | did not qualify | | | | | | |
| (Norway) 2014 | did not qualify | | | | | | |
| (Israel) 2015 | Group stage | 3 | 0 | 0 | 3 | 1 | 9 |
| (Slovakia) 2016 | did not qualify | | | | | | |
| (Northern Ireland) 2017 | did not qualify | | | | | | |
| (Switzerland) 2018 | did not qualify | | | | | | |
| (Bulgaria) 2019 | did not qualify | | | | | | |
| (Georgia (country)) ~~2020~~ | Cancelled | | | | | | |
| (Belarus) ~~2021~~ | Cancelled | | | | | | |
| (Czech Republic) 2022 | did not qualify | | | | | | |
| (Belgium) 2023 | did not qualify | | | | | | |
| (Lithuania) 2024 | did not qualify | | | | | | |
| (Poland) 2025 | did not qualify | | | | | | |
| (Bosnia and Herzegovina) 2026 | did not qualify | | | | | | |
| (Hungary) 2027 | TBD | | | | | | |
| Total | 1/26 | 3 | 0 | 0 | 3 | 1 | 9 |
