= F.C. Ramat HaSharon =

- Full name: Football Club Ramat HaSharon מועדון כדורגל רמת השרון
- Founded: 2005
- Ground: Grundman Stadium, Ramat HaSharon
- Capacity: 4,300
- Manager: Sharon Paz
- League: Ligat Nashim
- 2024–25: 4th

F.C. Ramat HaSharon (Hebrew: מועדון כדורגל רמת השרון) is an Israeli women's football club from Ramat HaSharon competing in the Israeli First League and the Israeli Women's Cup.

== History ==
The club was established in 2005 joined the league, playing its first season in the northern group, eventually finishing first in the group and qualifying to the championship group, where, by the end of the season the club finished as runners-up. In the following seasons the club finished in the 4th and 5th position, before relegating to the second division at the end of the 2009–10 season.

The club played two seasons in the second division, finishing top of the league in its second season and promoting back to the top division. During this season the club won the second division league cup, completing a minor double.

In the cup, the club's best achievement is reaching the final in 2013, losing 1–7 to Maccabi Holon. The club reached the semi-finals following season, falling 0–1 to Maccabi Kishronot Hadera.

== Squad ==
- Jaylin Bosak

== Titles ==
- Ligat Nashim (2)
  - 2015–16, 2019–2020,
- Liga Leumit (1)
  - 2011–12
- Second Division League Cup (1)
  - 2011–12
