= Hapoel Be'er Sheva F.C. (women) =

Hapoel Be'er Sheva WFC
- Full name: Hapoel Be'er Sheva Football WFC Club הפועל באר שבע נשים
- Founded: 2000
- Ground: Turner Stadium
- Capacity: 16,126
- Chairman: Michael Reuven
- Manager: Andrea Bercholc
- League: Israeli 2nd Division
- 2024–25: 8th, Ligat Al (relegated)

Hapoel Be'er Sheva (Hebrew: הפועל באר שבע) is an Israeli women's football club from Be'er Sheva competing in the Ligat Nashim and the Israeli Women's Cup.

== History ==
The club was established in 2000 and entered the league, where the club had played until relegating at the end of the 2009–10 season. The club bounced straight back to the first division, winning the second division in its first attempt, but relegated back to the second division two seasons later, managing to win a single point the entire season. The club had played in the second division until 2017-18 season. The club played in the first league 2018-19 season. At the end of that season the club was relegated back to the second division for 2019-20 season and bounced back to the first division for season 2020-21.

In the cup, the club had reached the semi-finals seven times, most recently in 2017–18. The club also competed in the Second Division League Cup and won the cup in 2011, beating Maccabi Kishronot Hadera B 7–1 in the final. In the season of 2022/2023 the club was demoted to the second division.

== Titles ==
- Israeli Second Division
  - 2010–11
- Second Division League Cup
  - 2010–11
- Israeli Second Division
  - 2017–18
- Israeli Second Division
  - 2019–20

== Current squad ==
Note: Flags indicate national team as defined under FIFA eligibility rules; some limited exceptions apply. Players may hold more than one non-FIFA nationality.

No.	Pos.	Nation	Player
1	GK	ZAM	Hazel Nali
3		ISR	Moran Rotenberg
5		ISR	Dana Berezovski
6		ISR	Or Erez
8		ISR	Shaked Elimelech
9		ISR	Chen Elhadad
10		ISR	Esthi Elmakayes
11		ISR	Arava Shahaf
12	DF	BRA	Letícia Albuquerque

No.	Pos.	Nation	Player
13		ISR	Noam Hadar
14		ISR	Mili Lugasi
15		ISR	Karina Tsvetkov
16		ISR	Noa Zari
20		ISR	Shahar Gordon
24		ISR	Chen Levi
32		ISR	Yehudit Nosgorotsky
77	DF	BRA	Kathleen Cruz
