= ASA Tel Aviv University =

ASA Tel Aviv WFC
- Full name: ASA Tel Aviv WFC אגודת ספורט אוניברסיטת תל אביב
- Founded: 1998
- Ground: Tel Aviv University Football Ground, Tel Aviv
- Chairman: Omer Greenman
- Manager: Oren Krispin
- League: Ligat Al Nashim
- 2024–25: 6th
Home colours	Away colours

ASA Tel Aviv WFC is a women's football club from Tel Aviv. The club is affiliated with Tel Aviv University and is part of the ASA Tel Aviv Sports Club. The club has won eight Ligat Nashim titles and five Israeli Women's Cup finals, and has participated in the UEFA Women's Champions League.

== History ==
The club was amongst the first to be established in Israel, when the IFA set up the women's league, and is the only club to play in the 1st league since its beginning.

In its 24 seasons in the Israeli women's football league, the club has won eight championships and finished seven times as runners-up. By winning the league, the club qualified to the UEFA Women's Champions League, first appearing in 2010–11. In eight attempts, the club has qualified once from the qualifying round, in 2011–12, eventually losing to Torres Calcio Femminile in the Round of 32.

In the Israeli Women's Cup, the club has appeared in eleven finals, losing in its first seven, including in six straight finals between 2004 and 2009. The club finally won its first cup in 2011 and added two more wins in 2012 and 2014.

== Titles ==
- 8 Israeli women's championships: 1999–2000, 2009–10, 2010–11, 2011–12, 2012–13, 2013–14, 2014–15, 2018-19
- 5 Israeli Women's Cup winners: 2010–11, 2011–12, 2013–14, 2016-17, 2018-19

== Current squad ==
- As of December 2021:

Note: Flags indicate national team as defined under FIFA eligibility rules; some limited exceptions apply. Players may hold more than one non-FIFA nationality.

No.	Pos.	Nation	Player
1	GK	(United States) USA	Kelly Lamorte
8	DF	(Israel) ISR	Shani David
3	DF	(Israel) ISR	Michal Sally Been
20	DF	(Israel) ISR	Noam Achtel
16	MF	(Israel) ISR	Moran Moscovici
9	FW	(Israel) ISR	Maria Almasri
18	DF	(Israel) ISR	Sapir Elbaz
6	MF	(Israel) ISR	Avishag Ais
10	MF	(United States) USA	Shea Moyer
14	FW	(Ghana) GHA	Elizabeth Owusuaa

No.	Pos.	Nation	Player
12	MF	(Israel) ISR	Talma Tal
19	MF	(Israel) ISR	Maya Ephrati
2	DF	(Israel) ISR	Shai-lee Glaun
21	MF	(Israel) ISR	Talia Mor
5	MF	(Israel) ISR	Zohar Cohen
15	MF	(Israel) ISR	Maya Gabrieli
23	MF	(United States) USA	Kiley Norkus
22	GK	(Israel) ISR	Eliana Blecher
7	MF	(Israel) ISR	Noa Mishiakov

=== Former internationals ===
- Israel: Lia Barkai, Amit Cohen, Vered Cohen, Yifat Cohen, Mor Efraim, Shira Elinav, Lee Falkon, Moran Fridman, Sarah Lynn Friedman, Shelly Israel, Shahar Nakav, Shay Sade, Mairav Shamir
- Canada: Nkem Ezurike
- Denmark: Nina Frausing-Pedersen
- United States women's national soccer team: Bella Bixby
- Switzerland women's national football team: Rachel Rinast

== European record ==
Competition	Round	Country	Club	Result
2010–11 UEFA Women's Champions League	Qualifying round	(Sweden)	Umeå IK	0–3
2010–11 UEFA Women's Champions League	Qualifying round	(Bosnia and Herzegovina)	SFK 2000	3–1
2010–11 UEFA Women's Champions League	Qualifying round	(Cyprus)	Apollon Limassol	0–3
2011–12 UEFA Women's Champions League	Qualifying round	(Portugal)	S.U. 1º de Dezembro	1–1
2011–12 UEFA Women's Champions League	Qualifying round	(Hungary)	MTK Budapest FC	1–0
2011–12 UEFA Women's Champions League	Qualifying round	(Latvia)	FK Liepājas Metalurgs	4–1
2011–12 UEFA Women's Champions League	Round of 32	(Italy)	Torres Calcio Femminile	0–2 (h), 2–3 (a)
2012–13 UEFA Women's Champions League	Qualifying round	(Wales)	Cardiff Met. Ladies F.C.	5–0
2012–13 UEFA Women's Champions League	Qualifying round	(Republic of Ireland)	Peamount United	0–5
2012–13 UEFA Women's Champions League	Qualifying round	(Bosnia and Herzegovina)	SFK 2000	1–1
2013–14 UEFA Women's Champions League	Qualifying round	(Moldova)	Goliador Chişinău	6-0
2013–14 UEFA Women's Champions League	Qualifying round	(Slovakia)	Nové Zámky	0-0
2013–14 UEFA Women's Champions League	Qualifying round	(Cyprus)	Apollon Limassol	0-3
2014–15 UEFA Women's Champions League	Qualifying round	(Wales)	Cardiff Met.	2–0
2014–15 UEFA Women's Champions League	Qualifying round	(Portugal)	Atlético Ouriense	1–2
2014–15 UEFA Women's Champions League	Qualifying round	(Belgium)	Standard Liège	0–1
2015–16 UEFA Women's Champions League	Qualifying round	(Luxembourg)	Jeunesse Junglinster	5–1
2015–16 UEFA Women's Champions League	Qualifying round	(Hungary)	Ferencváros	1–2
2015–16 UEFA Women's Champions League	Qualifying round	(Netherlands)	FC Twente	0–7
2019-20 Uefa Women's Champions League	Qualifying round	(Iceland)	Breiðablik women's football	1-4
2019-20 Uefa Women's Champions League	Qualifying round	(Bosnia and Herzegovina)	SFK 2000	0-1
2019-20 Uefa Women's Champions League	Qualifying round	(North Macedonia)	ŽFK Dragon 2014	7-0
