= Ligat Nashim =

Israeli women's football league

- Founded: 1998
- Country: Israel
- Confederation: UEFA
- Number of clubs: 8
- Level on pyramid: 1
- Domestic cup: Israeli Women's Cup
- International cup: UEFA Champions League
- Current champions: Hapoel Katamon Jerusalem (1st title) (2025–26)
- Most championships: ASA Tel Aviv University (8 titles)
- Top scorer: Silvi Jan (826 goals)
- Website: Official
- Current: 2026–27

Ligat Nashim (Hebrew: ליגת נשים, lit. 'Women's League') is the Israeli women's football league. It has been run by the Israel Football Association since 1998.

== Format ==
The league is divided into two divisions, with the top division, titled Women's Premier League (previously Ligat Nashim Rishona, lit. "First Women's League"), comprising 9 teams, and the second division, titled Women's Leumit League (previously Ligat Nashim Shniya, lit. "Second Women's League"), comprising a variable number of teams, depending on registration. In 2015, a third division was created, named Mama-Foot League (meaning: a football league for mothers) at first, and changed to Women's Artzit League in 2016. The third division is contested in smaller pitches, over two-halves of 15 minutes each and with unlimited substitutions and the winner does not promote to the second division.

Between 2007–08 and 2010–11 the league was made of one division of 12 teams in a round-robin tournament with the top club winning the championship, with a deciding play-off match to decide the winner if the two teams were tied, as was the case in 2009–10. In 2010–11 the IFA re-introduced a second division that previously existed in 2006–07.

Since 2011, the participating clubs first play a conventional round-robin schedule, followed by a championship playoff contested by the four top teams, where they meet each other twice. Upon its conclusion, the first place team wins the Israeli championship and qualifies to participate in the UEFA Women's Champions League. The bottom teams play each other once to avoid relegation, with the bottom club dropping to the second division. The second division is played as a double round-robin schedule, each team playing its opponents four times, with the top club promoting to the top division.

== Champions ==
A women's football league was organized in late 1998 and started playing during October 1998. In 2003–04 the league was abandoned in mid-season and was never completed.

Season	First Division	Second Division	Third Division
1998–99	Maccabi Haifa	–	–
1999–2000	ASA Tel Aviv University	–	–
2000–01	Hapoel Tel Aviv	–	–
2001–02	Maccabi Haifa	–	–
2002–03	Maccabi Holon	–	–
2003–04	League abandoned	–	–
2004–05	Maccabi Holon	–	–
2005–06	Maccabi Holon	–	–
2006–07	Maccabi Holon	Ironi Bat Yam	–
2007–08	Maccabi Holon	–	–
2008–09	Maccabi Holon	–	–
2009–10	ASA Tel Aviv University	–	–
2010–11	ASA Tel Aviv University	Hapoel Be'er Sheva	–
2011–12	ASA Tel Aviv University	F.C. Ramat HaSharon	–
2012–13	ASA Tel Aviv University	F.C. Kiryat Gat	–
2013–14	ASA Tel Aviv University	Maccabi Tzur Shalom Bialik	–
2014–15	ASA Tel Aviv University	Maccabi Be'er Sheva	Bnot Meitav Tel Aviv
2015–16	F.C. Ramat HaSharon	Bnot Netanya F.C.	Bnot Meitav Tel Aviv
2016–17	F.C. Kiryat Gat	Hapoel Ra'anana	Bnot Ironi Modi'in
2017–18	F.C. Kiryat Gat	Hapoel Be'er Sheva	Maccabi Bnot Or Avika
2018–19	ASA Tel Aviv University	Maccabi Bnot Emek Hefer	Hapoel Bnot Arabe
2019–20	F.C. Ramat HaSharon	Hapoel Be'er Sheva	ASA Tel Aviv University B
2020–21	F.C. Kiryat Gat	Hapoel Marmorek	Hapoel Tel Aviv
2021–22	F.C. Kiryat Gat	Hapoel Ironi Petah Tikva	Hapoel Kiryat Yam
2022–23	F.C. Kiryat Gat	Hapoel Ra'anana	Or Yehuda
2023–24	F.C. Kiryat Gat	Hapoel Tel Aviv	Maccabi Atlit
2024–25	F.C. Kiryat Gat	Hapoel Ra'anana	Hapoel Ironi Bnot Karmiel
2025–26	Hapoel Katamon Jerusalem		

=== Total championships ===
Club	Titles
ASA Tel Aviv	8
Maccabi Holon	7
Kiryat Gat	6
Maccabi Haifa	2
Ramat HaSharon	2
Hapoel Katamon Jerusalem	1
Hapoel Tel Aviv	1
