= List of Israel women's international footballers =

The Israel women's national football team represents Israel in international association football. It is fielded by Israel Football Association, the governing body of football in Israel, and competes as a member of the Union of European Football Associations, having previously been a part of the Asian Football Confederation. This is a list of Israel women's international footballers who have played for the national team in an "A" international match.

The first official international football match took place on 2 November 1997 against Romania.

Karin Sendel is Israel's most capped player with 69 appearances for the national team.

== Players ==
Caps and goals are current as of 13 October 2026 after the match against Switzerland. Players in bold have been called up to the squad in the last 12 months.

| Player | Caps | Goals | Debut | | | Last or Most Recent Match | | |
| Player | Caps | Goals | Date | Opponent | Location | Date | Opponent | Location |
|---|---|---|---|---|---|---|---|---|
| Iris Antman | 20 | 0 | 2 November 1997 | Romania | Bat Yam, Israel | 25 August 2010 | Republic of Ireland | Bray, Republic of Ireland |
| Yifat Avidan | 5 | 0 | 2 November 1997 | Romania | Bat Yam, Israel | 1 April 1998 | Slovakia | Bat Yam, Israel |
| Diana Awisat | 9 | 0 | 2 November 1997 | Romania | Bat Yam, Israel | 5 July 2000 | Belarus | Minsk, Belarus |
| Kim Belo | 7 | 0 | 2 November 1997 | Romania | Bat Yam, Israel | 17 May 1998 | Hungary | Kecskemét, Hungary |
| Liat Biran | 9 | 1 | 2 November 1997 | Romania | Bat Yam, Israel | 5 July 2000 | Belarus | Minsk, Belarus |
| Iris Fisher | 8 | 0 | 2 November 1997 | Romania | Bat Yam, Israel | 5 July 2000 | Belarus | Minsk, Belarus |
| Netanela Hajaj | 14 | 1 | 2 November 1997 | Romania | Bat Yam, Israel | 6 June 2002 | Croatia | Kyiv, Ukraine |
| Silvi Jan | 23 | 29 | 2 November 1997 | Romania | Bat Yam, Israel | 10 May 2007 | Poland | Ramat Gan, Israel |
| Tali Kabel | 4 | 0 | 2 November 1997 | Romania | Bat Yam, Israel | 25 February 1998 | Poland | Ramat Gan, Israel |
| Haya Levi | 3 | 0 | 2 November 1997 | Romania | Bat Yam, Israel | 11 February 1998 | Turkey | Netanya, Israel |
| Ilanit Mesika | 2 | 0 | 2 November 1997 | Romania | Bat Yam, Israel | 11 February 1998 | Turkey | Netanya, Israel |
| Efrat Salomon | 4 | 0 | 2 November 1997 | Romania | Bat Yam, Israel | 17 May 1998 | Hungary | Kecskemét, Hungary |
| Sonya Simhoni | 1 | 0 | 2 November 1997 | Romania | Bat Yam, Israel | 2 November 1997 | Romania | Bat Yam, Israel |
| Ettie Cohen | 4 | 0 | 9 February 1998 | Turkey | Netanya, Israel | 1 April 1998 | Slovakia | Bat Yam, Israel |
| Meital Dayan | 29 | 4 | 9 February 1998 | Turkey | Netanya, Israel | 25 June 2008 | Austria | Beit She'an, Israel |
| Keren Bachar | 4 | 1 | 11 February 1998 | Turkey | Netanya, Israel | 13 May 1998 | Slovakia | Prešov, Slovakia |
| Naomi Belhassen | 21 | 0 | 11 February 1998 | Turkey | Netanya, Israel | 29 May 2008 | Russia | Krasnoarmeysk, Russia |
| Parahia Bibi | 7 | 0 | 11 February 1998 | Turkey | Netanya, Israel | 17 May 1998 | Hungary | Kecskemét, Hungary |
| Hillit Gonen | 6 | 0 | 11 February 1998 | Turkey | Netanya, Israel | 13 May 1998 | Slovakia | Prešov, Slovakia |
| Orly Neba'a | 6 | 2 | 11 February 1998 | Turkey | Netanya, Israel | 17 May 1998 | Hungary | Kecskemét, Hungary |
| Iris Steiner | 1 | 0 | 24 February 1998 | Poland | Ramat Gan, Israel | 24 February 1998 | Poland | Ramat Gan, Israel |
| Sharon Tubul | 4 | 0 | 25 February 1998 | Poland | Ramat Gan, Israel | 17 May 1998 | Hungary | Kecskemét, Hungary |
| Na'ama Shiran | 2 | 0 | 8 April 1998 | Bosnia and Herzegovina | Bat Yam, Israel | 17 May 1998 | Hungary | Kecskemét, Hungary |
| Hannah Halali | 1 | 0 | 13 May 1998 | Slovakia | Prešov, Slovakia | 13 May 1998 | Slovakia | Prešov, Slovakia |
| Anna Abramovitch | 1 | 0 | 5 July 2000 | Belarus | Minsk, Belarus | 5 July 2000 | Belarus | Minsk, Belarus |
| Inna Didich | 13 | 5 | 5 July 2000 | Belarus | Minsk, Belarus | 7 May 2006 | Estonia | Herzliya, Israel |
| Tamara Kochen | 6 | 0 | 5 July 2000 | Belarus | Minsk, Belarus | 6 June 2002 | Croatia | Kyiv, Ukraine |
| Moran Lavi | 35 | 2 | 5 July 2000 | Belarus | Minsk, Belarus | 21 August 2014 | Serbia | Pećinci, Serbia |
| Becky Linor | 2 | 0 | 5 July 2000 | Belarus | Minsk, Belarus | 23 September 2001 | Croatia | Velika Gorica, Croatia |
| Anat Maimoni | 26 | 0 | 5 July 2000 | Belarus | Minsk, Belarus | 25 June 2008 | Austria | Beit She'an, Israel |
| Maya Ozeri | 7 | 1 | 5 July 2000 | Belarus | Minsk, Belarus | 6 June 2002 | Croatia | Kyiv, Ukraine |
| Sarit Shenar | 39 | 14 | 5 July 2000 | Belarus | Minsk, Belarus | 19 September 2012 | Republic of Ireland | Ramat Gan, Israel |
| Diana Abu Mokh | 8 | 0 | 2 September 2001 | Estonia | Tallinn, Estonia | 6 June 2002 | Croatia | Kyiv, Ukraine |
| Revital Amoyal | 5 | 0 | 2 September 2001 | Estonia | Tallinn, Estonia | 6 June 2002 | Croatia | Kyiv, Ukraine |
| Sivan Fahima | 27 | 2 | 2 September 2001 | Estonia | Tallinn, Estonia | 17 November 2009 | Russia | Ramat Gan, Israel |
| Oshrat Kreker | 3 | 0 | 2 September 2001 | Estonia | Tallinn, Estonia | 28 October 2001 | Romania | Ramat Gan, Israel |
| Iris Nafossi | 4 | 0 | 2 September 2001 | Estonia | Tallinn, Estonia | 18 November 2001 | Poland | Kfar Saba, Israel |
| Shikma Oded | 5 | 0 | 2 September 2001 | Estonia | Tallinn, Estonia | 5 May 2002 | Poland | Włocławek, Poland |
| Ayala Truelove | 2 | 0 | 28 October 2001 | Romania | Ramat Gan, Israel | 18 November 2001 | Poland | Kfar Saba, Israel |
| Salu Amsis | 4 | 0 | 5 May 2002 | Poland | Włocławek, Poland | 6 June 2002 | Croatia | Kyiv, Ukraine |
| Shirley Ohana | 25 | 7 | 5 May 2002 | Poland | Włocławek, Poland | 24 February 2010 | Belarus | Netanya, Israel |
| Hannah Rice Heather | 2 | 0 | 5 May 2002 | Poland | Włocławek, Poland | 6 June 2002 | Croatia | Kyiv, Ukraine |
| Maya Barqui | 48 | 0 | 26 May 2002 | Romania | Câmpina, Romania | 19 September 2016 | Norway | Ulsteinvik, Norway |
| Dovrat Van Ouwerkerk | 7 | 0 | 26 May 2002 | Romania | Câmpina, Romania | 25 June 2008 | Austria | Beit She'an, Israel |
| Rachel Shelina Israel | 39 | 5 | 21 August 2005 | Estonia | Pärnu, Estonia | 16 March 2016 | Cyprus | Cyprus |
| Dana Kerem | 4 | 1 | 21 August 2005 | Estonia | Pärnu, Estonia | 19 June 2014 | Denmark | Ramat Gan, Israel |
| Michal Ravitz | 48 | 0 | 21 August 2005 | Estonia | Pärnu, Estonia | 19 September 2016 | Norway | Ulsteinvik, Norway |
| Hanit Schwartz | 28 | 0 | 21 August 2005 | Estonia | Pärnu, Estonia | 12 November 2019 | Bosnia and Herzegovina | Haifa, Israel |
| Tal Shino | 20 | 3 | 21 August 2005 | Estonia | Pärnu, Estonia | 19 September 2012 | Republic of Ireland | Ramat Gan, Israel |
| Daniel Sofer | 42 | 5 | 21 August 2005 | Estonia | Pärnu, Estonia | 7 November 2019 | Malta | Ta' Qali, Malta |
| Vered Cohen | 11 | 2 | 10 November 2005 | Moldova | Rishon LeZion, Israel | 3 September 2019 | Denmark | Ramat Gan, Israel |
| Karin Sendel | 69 | 1 | 10 November 2005 | Moldova | Rishon LeZion, Israel | 2 December 2023 | Armenia | Yerevan, Armenia |
| Tal Sofer | 12 | 0 | 10 November 2005 | Moldova | Rishon LeZion, Israel | 17 August 2009 | Belarus | Belarus |
| Rebecca Glick | 5 | 0 | 30 March 2006 | Wales | Cardiff, Wales | 17 August 2009 | Belarus | Belarus |
| Adi Stein | 11 | 0 | 30 March 2006 | Wales | Cardiff, Wales | 26 October 2011 | France | Troyes, France |
| Adi Yurman | 5 | 0 | 30 March 2006 | Wales | Cardiff, Wales | 26 August 2007 | Austria | Gleisdorf, Austria |
| Or Erez | 34 | 2 | 7 May 2006 | Estonia | Herzliya, Israel | 7 May 2014 | Malta | Ta' Qali, Malta |
| Nicole Hajuel | 3 | 0 | 30 May 2007 | Russia | Ramat Gan, Israel | 26 August 2007 | Austria | Gleisdorf, Austria |
| Oshrat Eni | 11 | 0 | 26 August 2007 | Austria | Gleisdorf, Austria | 19 September 2012 | Republic of Ireland | Ramat Gan, Israel |
| Shir Levo | 7 | 0 | 26 August 2007 | Austria | Gleisdorf, Austria | 15 March 2016 | Estonia | Cyprus |
| Sahar Nissim | 4 | 0 | 17 February 2008 | Belarus | Netanya, Israel | 29 May 2008 | Russia | Krasnoarmeysk, Russia |
| Hila Havia | 1 | 0 | 20 February 2008 | Belarus | Netanya, Israel | 20 February 2008 | Belarus | Netanya, Israel |
| Na'ama Cohen | 11 | 0 | 20 February 2008 | Belarus | Netanya, Israel | 17 September 2014 | Denmark | Vejle, Denmark |
| Matar Rahamim | 1 | 0 | 20 February 2008 | Belarus | Netanya, Israel | 20 February 2008 | Belarus | Netanya, Israel |
| Shiri Ron | 1 | 0 | 20 February 2008 | Belarus | Netanya, Israel | 20 February 2008 | Belarus | Netanya, Israel |
| Adva Twil | 48 | 0 | 20 February 2008 | Belarus | Netanya, Israel | 12 June 2018 | Austria | Ramat Gan, Israel |
| Yifat Cohen | 19 | 2 | 15 August 2009 | Belarus | Belarus | 24 November 2013 | Serbia | Petah Tikva, Israel |
| Reut David | 5 | 1 | 15 August 2009 | Belarus | Belarus | 21 March 2010 | Republic of Ireland | Ness Ziona, Israel |
| Lee Falkon | 46 | 7 | 15 August 2009 | Belarus | Belarus | 1 December 2020 | Malta | Ramat Gan, Israel |
| Tali Hanan | 7 | 0 | 15 August 2009 | Belarus | Belarus | 27 March 2010 | Switzerland | Wohlen, Switzerland |
| Shay Sade | 49 | 1 | 15 August 2009 | Belarus | Belarus | 12 November 2019 | Bosnia and Herzegovina | Haifa, Israel |
| Ortal Shmailov | 11 | 0 | 15 August 2009 | Belarus | Belarus | 20 November 2011 | Wales | Ness Ziona, Israel |
| **Shani David** | 55 | 0 | 17 August 2009 | Belarus | Belarus | 13 October 2026 | Switzerland | Sion, Switzerland |
| Moran Fridman | 31 | 2 | 24 October 2009 | Kazakhstan | Ness Ziona, Israel | 15 September 2016 | Wales | Newport, Wales |
| Meirav Shamir | 36 | 0 | 24 October 2009 | Kazakhstan | Ness Ziona, Israel | 19 September 2016 | Norway | Ulsteinvik, Norway |
| Hanin Nasser | 1 | 0 | 22 February 2010 | Belarus | Netanya, Israel | 22 February 2010 | Belarus | Netanya, Israel |
| Aya Cohen | 1 | 0 | 24 February 2010 | Belarus | Netanya, Israel | 24 February 2010 | Belarus | Netanya, Israel |
| Diana Redman | 30 | 0 | 19 June 2010 | Kazakhstan | Astana, Kazakhstan | 12 June 2018 | Austria | Ramat Gan, Israel |
| Nora Shanab | 13 | 0 | 14 September 2011 | France | Ness Ziona, Israel | 24 February 2021 | Italy | Florence, Italy |
| Sara Fridman | 4 | 0 | 27 October 2013 | Malta | Ramat Gan, Israel | 7 May 2014 | Malta | Ta' Qali, Malta |
| Arava Shahaf | 30 | 3 | 27 October 2013 | Malta | Ramat Gan, Israel | 12 June 2018 | Austria | Ramat Gan, Israel |
| **Eden Avital** | 51 | 7 | 12 February 2014 | Switzerland | Petah Tikva, Israel | 14 April 2026 | Luxembourg | Budaörs, Hungary |
| Shai Pearl | 18 | 0 | 12 February 2014 | Switzerland | Petah Tikva, Israel | 6 September 2022 | Serbia | Ness Ziona, Israel |
| Roni Shimrich | 19 | 0 | 12 February 2014 | Switzerland | Petah Tikva, Israel | 1 December 2020 | Malta | Ramat Gan, Israel |
| Tal Esayev | 4 | 0 | 19 June 2014 | Denmark | Ramat Gan, Israel | 17 September 2014 | Denmark | Vejle, Denmark |
| Mor Efraim | 8 | 1 | 22 October 2015 | Kazakhstan | Lod, Israel | 12 November 2019 | Bosnia and Herzegovina | Haifa, Israel |
| **Shahar Nakav** | 51 | 0 | 22 October 2015 | Kazakhstan | Lod, Israel | 13 October 2026 | Switzerland | Sion, Switzerland |
| Victoria Graiver | 1 | 0 | 21 January 2016 | Ukraine | Ramat Gan, Israel | 21 January 2016 | Ukraine | Ramat Gan, Israel |
| Alina Metkalov | 15 | 0 | 21 January 2016 | Ukraine | Ramat Gan, Israel | 12 June 2018 | Austria | Ramat Gan, Israel |
| Danielle Paz | 2 | 0 | 21 January 2016 | Ukraine | Ramat Gan, Israel | 8 April 2017 | Andorra | Vilnius, Lithuania |
| Danielle Schulmann | 12 | 3 | 10 March 2016 | Malta | Cyprus | 7 April 2022 | Serbia | Stara Pazova, Serbia |
| Noam Achtel | 18 | 0 | 6 April 2017 | Lithuania | Vilnius, Lithuania | 4 June 2024 | Scotland | Budaörs, Hungary |
| **Marian Awad** | 42 | 5 | 6 April 2017 | Lithuania | Vilnius, Lithuania | 13 October 2026 | Switzerland | Sion, Switzerland |
| Linoy Rogers | 3 | 1 | 6 April 2017 | Lithuania | Vilnius, Lithuania | 11 April 2017 | Moldova | Vilnius, Lithuania |
| Ranin Salameh | 1 | 0 | 8 April 2017 | Andorra | Vilnius, Lithuania | 8 April 2017 | Andorra | Vilnius, Lithuania |
| Keren Goor | 12 | 1 | 23 October 2017 | Spain | Ramat Gan, Israel | 23 June 2022 | Bulgaria | Plovdiv, Bulgaria |
| Lia Barkai | 9 | 0 | 23 November 2017 | Austria | Maria Enzersdorf, Austria | 10 March 2020 | Georgia | Rishon LeZion, Israel |
| Shayna Levy | 2 | 0 | 23 November 2017 | Austria | Maria Enzersdorf, Austria | 26 November 2017 | Finland | Helsinki, Finland |
| Karin Rahamim | 4 | 0 | 10 April 2018 | Serbia | Ramat Gan, Israel | 24 February 2021 | Italy | Florence, Italy |
| **Sharon Beck** | 24 | 10 | 7 June 2018 | Spain | Murcia, Spain | 9 April 2024 | Serbia | Győr, Hungary |
| Levie Van Ouwerkerk | 1 | 0 | 7 June 2018 | Spain | Murcia, Spain | 7 June 2018 | Spain | Murcia, Spain |
| Amit Cohen | 10 | 0 | 29 August 2019 | Italy | Ramat Gan, Israel | 7 April 2022 | Serbia | Stara Pazova, Serbia |
| **Shira Elinav** | 25 | 4 | 29 August 2019 | Italy | Ramat Gan, Israel | 7 March 2026 | Belgium | Budaörs, Hungary |
| **Rachel Steinschneider** | 39 | 3 | 12 November 2019 | Bosnia and Herzegovina | Haifa, Israel | 9 June 2026 | Scotland | Budapest, Hungary |
| Michal Been | 3 | 0 | 10 March 2020 | Georgia | Rishon LeZion, Israel | 1 December 2020 | Malta | Ramat Gan, Israel |
| Koral Hazan | 22 | 2 | 21 October 2020 | Denmark | Viborg, Denmark | 31 May 2024 | Scotland | Glasgow, Scotland |
| **Vital Kats** | 20 | 8 | 21 October 2020 | Denmark | Viborg, Denmark | 13 October 2026 | Switzerland | Sion, Switzerland |
| Irena Kuznetsov | 22 | 2 | 21 October 2020 | Denmark | Viborg, Denmark | 25 February 2025 | Estonia | Győr, Hungary |
| Reut Michaeli | 4 | 0 | 21 October 2020 | Denmark | Viborg, Denmark | 24 February 2021 | Italy | Florence, Italy |
| **Noa Selimhodzic** | 40 | 9 | 21 October 2020 | Denmark | Viborg, Denmark | 9 October 2026 | Switzerland | Mezőkövesd, Hungary |
| Meytal Sharabi | 22 | 2 | 21 October 2020 | Denmark | Viborg, Denmark | 21 February 2025 | Bulgaria | Sofia, Bulgaria |
| Opal Sofer | 16 | 1 | 21 October 2020 | Denmark | Viborg, Denmark | 31 May 2024 | Scotland | Glasgow, Scotland |
| Marom Keren | 2 | 0 | 27 October 2020 | Georgia | Tbilisi, Georgia | 30 May 2025 | Estonia | Tallinn, Estonia |
| Hodaya Biton | 3 | 0 | 24 February 2021 | Italy | Florence, Italy | 5 December 2023 | Estonia | Telki, Hungary |
| Yarden Malka Ozel | 3 | 0 | 24 February 2021 | Italy | Florence, Italy | 21 February 2022 | Greece | Patras, Greece |
| **Reut Revaha** | 5 | 0 | 24 February 2021 | Italy | Florence, Italy | 3 March 2026 | Belgium | Budaörs, Hungary |
| **Fortuna Rubin** | 26 | 0 | 24 February 2021 | Italy | Florence, Italy | 9 October 2026 | Switzerland | Mezőkövesd, Hungary |
| Rakefet Zaiden | 1 | 0 | 24 February 2021 | Italy | Florence, Italy | 24 February 2021 | Italy | Florence, Italy |
| Libby Zelikowitz | 3 | 0 | 24 February 2021 | Italy | Florence, Italy | 6 September 2022 | Serbia | Ness Ziona, Israel |
| **Amit Beilin** | 10 | 0 | 19 September 2021 | Portugal | Rishon LeZion, Israel | 13 October 2026 | Switzerland | Sion, Switzerland |
| **Talia Sommer** | 32 | 9 | 19 September 2021 | Portugal | Rishon LeZion, Israel | 13 October 2026 | Switzerland | Sion, Switzerland |
| Maya Chitman | 11 | 0 | 21 October 2021 | Germany | Petah Tikva, Israel | 9 April 2024 | Serbia | Győr, Hungary |
| Lior Edri | 2 | 0 | 21 October 2021 | Germany | Petah Tikva, Israel | 26 October 2021 | Germany | Essen, Germany |
| Hunter Ashlyn More | 3 | 0 | 23 June 2022 | Bulgaria | Plovdiv, Bulgaria | 11 April 2023 | Hungary | Győr, Hungary |
| **Maria Almasri** | 19 | 1 | 1 September 2022 | Bulgaria | Ness Ziona, Israel | 13 October 2026 | Switzerland | Sion, Switzerland |
| Keren Or Edri | 2 | 0 | 1 September 2022 | Bulgaria | Ness Ziona, Israel | 21 February 2025 | Bulgaria | Sofia, Bulgaria |
| **Itaf Alkisi** | 20 | 0 | 7 April 2023 | Hungary | Győr, Hungary | 13 October 2026 | Switzerland | Sion, Switzerland |
| **Hili Shalom** | 9 | 0 | 7 April 2023 | Hungary | Győr, Hungary | 13 October 2026 | Switzerland | Sion, Switzerland |
| Yahli Cohen | 3 | 0 | 11 April 2023 | Hungary | Győr, Hungary | 5 December 2023 | Estonia | Telki, Hungary |
| **Elianna Beard** | 11 | 1 | 26 September 2023 | Estonia | Tartu, Estonia | 9 October 2026 | Switzerland | Mezőkövesd, Hungary |
| Batoul Khalil | 4 | 0 | 26 September 2023 | Estonia | Tartu, Estonia | 8 April 2025 | Bulgaria | Budaörs, Hungary |
| **Asia Dercksen** | 6 | 0 | 26 September 2023 | Estonia | Tartu, Estonia | 9 June 2026 | Scotland | Budapest, Hungary |
| Hadas Morin | 4 | 0 | 23 November 2023 | Kazakhstan | Telki, Hungary | 8 April 2025 | Bulgaria | Budaörs, Hungary |
| Adi Goulden | 7 | 0 | 23 November 2023 | Kazakhstan | Telki, Hungary | 8 April 2025 | Bulgaria | Budaörs, Hungary |
| **Michaela Worko** | 12 | 0 | 23 November 2023 | Kazakhstan | Telki, Hungary | 18 April 2026 | Luxembourg | Budaörs, Hungary |
| **Tal Faingezicht** | 7 | 0 | 2 December 2023 | Armenia | Yerevan, Armenia | 9 June 2026 | Scotland | Budapest, Hungary |
| Lama Ghanammy | 1 | 0 | 2 December 2023 | Armenia | Yerevan, Armenia | 2 December 2023 | Armenia | Yerevan, Armenia |
| Maya Ganor | 1 | 0 | 16 July 2024 | Slovakia | Budaörs, Hungary | 16 July 2024 | Slovakia | Budaörs, Hungary |
| **Maia Cabrera** | 11 | 0 | 21 February 2025 | Bulgaria | Sofia, Bulgaria | 13 October 2026 | Switzerland | Sion, Switzerland |
| **Maayan Ben Israel** | 6 | 3 | 25 February 2025 | Estonia | Győr, Hungary | 18 April 2026 | Luxembourg | Budaörs, Hungary |
| Tomer Zecharia | 2 | 0 | 25 February 2025 | Estonia | Győr, Hungary | 8 April 2025 | Bulgaria | Budaörs, Hungary |
| **Smadar Cohen** | 9 | 1 | 30 May 2025 | Estonia | Tallinn, Estonia | 13 October 2026 | Switzerland | Sion, Switzerland |
| **Mia Shvill** | 4 | 0 | 3 March 2026 | Belgium | Budaörs, Hungary | 13 October 2026 | Switzerland | Sion, Switzerland |
| **Elis Blokhin** | 5 | 0 | 3 March 2026 | Belgium | Budaörs, Hungary | 9 June 2026 | Scotland | Budapest, Hungary |
| **Talma Tal** | 2 | 0 | 3 March 2026 | Belgium | Budaörs, Hungary | 5 June 2026 | Scotland | Budapest, Hungary |
| **Zohar Cohen** | 5 | 0 | 7 March 2026 | Belgium | Budaörs, Hungary | 13 October 2026 | Switzerland | Sion, Switzerland |
| **Tamar Lipsicas Geva** | 2 | 0 | 7 March 2026 | Belgium | Budaörs, Hungary | 13 October 2026 | Switzerland | Sion, Switzerland |
| **Maia Sirota** | 2 | 0 | 9 June 2026 | Scotland | Budapest, Hungary | 9 October 2026 | Switzerland | Mezőkövesd, Hungary |
| **Or Divan** | 2 | 0 | 9 October 2026 | Switzerland | Mezőkövesd, Hungary | 13 October 2026 | Switzerland | Sion, Switzerland |
| **Zohar Gat** | 1 | 0 | 13 October 2026 | Switzerland | Sion, Switzerland | 13 October 2026 | Switzerland | Sion, Switzerland |
