= 2016–17 Israeli Women's Cup =

Tournament details
- Country: Israel

Final positions
- Champions: ASA Tel Aviv University
- Runners-up: Maccabi Kishronot Hadera

Tournament statistics
- Matches played: 11
- Goals scored: 72 (6.55 per match)
- Top goal scorer: Daniel Ugarte (7)

The 2016–17 Israeli Women's Cup (Hebrew: גביע המדינה נשים , Gvia HaMedina Nashim) was the 19th season of Israel's women's nationwide football cup competition. The competition began on 29 November 2016 with 4 first round matches.

ASA Tel Aviv University won the cup, beating Maccabi Kishronot Hadera 2–1 in the final.

== Results ==
=== First round ===
29 November 2016	Hapoel Kfar Saba	0–10	Maccabi Kishronot Hadera	Kfar Saba
20:45		Report	2', 24', 38' Duncan; 4' (pen.), 19' Isayev; 16', 59' Nasser; 22' Twil; 76' T. Sofer; 87' D. Sofer	Stadium: Levita Stadium Synthetic Pitch; Referee: Dror Cohen

29 November 2016	Maccabi Be'er Sheva	0–7	Bnot Sakhnin	Be'er Sheva
20:30		Report	36', 56' Khatib; 62' Rashed; 64', 75' Abu Yunes; 65' Khalaila; 79' Abu Taya	Stadium: Reisser Stadium Syntetic Pitch; Referee: Dor Bashan

29 November 2016	Hapoe Petah Tikva	17–0	Maccabi Tzur Shalom Bialik	Petah Tikva
20:00	Havatzelet 8'; Graiver 14'; Ugarte 21', 23', 26', 40', 65', 84'; Abu Shanab 34', 47', 80', 88'; Havia 42', 51'; Sharabi 45'; O. Sapir 58' (pen.); Lechter 86'	Report		Stadium: HaMoshava Stadium Synthetic Pitch; Referee: Elad Cohen

29 November 2016	F.C. Kiryat Gat	4–2	Maccabi Holon	Kiryat Gat
19:30	Laiu 16', 65'; Ephraim 44'; Bendel 86'	Report	3' Iwuagwu; 50' Moara	Stadium: Synthetic Pitch; Referee: Meitar Shemesh

3 December 2016	Hapoel Ra'anana	0–9	F.C. Ramat HaSharon	Ramat HaSharon
21:00		Report	7', 41' Shimrich; 25' Luzon; 28' Shahaf; 35' (pen.) Machlev; 58' David; 60', 63' Dakwar; 70' Murnan	Stadium: Synthetic Pitch; Referee: Nufar Sakruka

=== Quarter-finals ===
19 February 2017	F.C. Ramat HaSharon	3–4	Maccabi Kishronot Hadera	Ramat HaSharon
19:30	Perl 25'; Sendel 45'; Shimrich 61'	Report	Duncan 1'; Nasser 36'; Young 47'; D. Sofer (61)	Stadium: Synthetic Pitch; Referee: Yigal Fried

19 February 2017	Hapoel Be'er Sheva	0–4	Bnot Sakhnin	Be'er Sheva
20:00		Report	4' Rashed; 56' Shenawi; 68' Ibrahim; 78' Ghaname	Stadium: Vasermil Stadium; Referee: Dor Bashan

19 February 2017	Hapoel Petah Tikva	1–2	F.C. Kiryat Gat	Petah Tikva
20:00	Ugarte 79'	Report	42' (pen.) Fahima; 87' Rachamim	Stadium: HaMoshava Stadium Synthetic Pitch; Referee: Dor Nizri

19 February 2017	Bnot Netanya	1–2	ASA Tel Aviv University	Netanya
20:40	Israel 53'	Report	23', 79' Eni	Stadium: Shapira Stadium; Referee: Rephael Geva

=== Semi-finals ===
4 May 2017	Maccabi Kishronot Hadera	w/o (Note: Bnot Sakhnin failed to appear to the match as most of their players had an exam set for this date.)	Bnot Sakhnin	Ramat Gan
18:00				Stadium: Ramat Gan Stadium

26 April 2017	F.C. Kiryat Gat	0–3	ASA Tel Aviv University	Ramat Gan
20:30		Report	18' Lavi; 26' Ohana; 37' Avital	Stadium: Ramat Gan Stadium; Referee: Meitar Shemesh

=== Final ===
18 May 2017
19:40

ASA Tel Aviv University	2–1	Maccabi Kishronot Hadera
Lavi 5', 30' (pen.)	Report	85' Twil

Municipal Stadium, Lod
Referee: Rachel Shakuri-Cohen
