= Karin Sendel =

Israeli footballer

Karin Sendel קארין סנדל
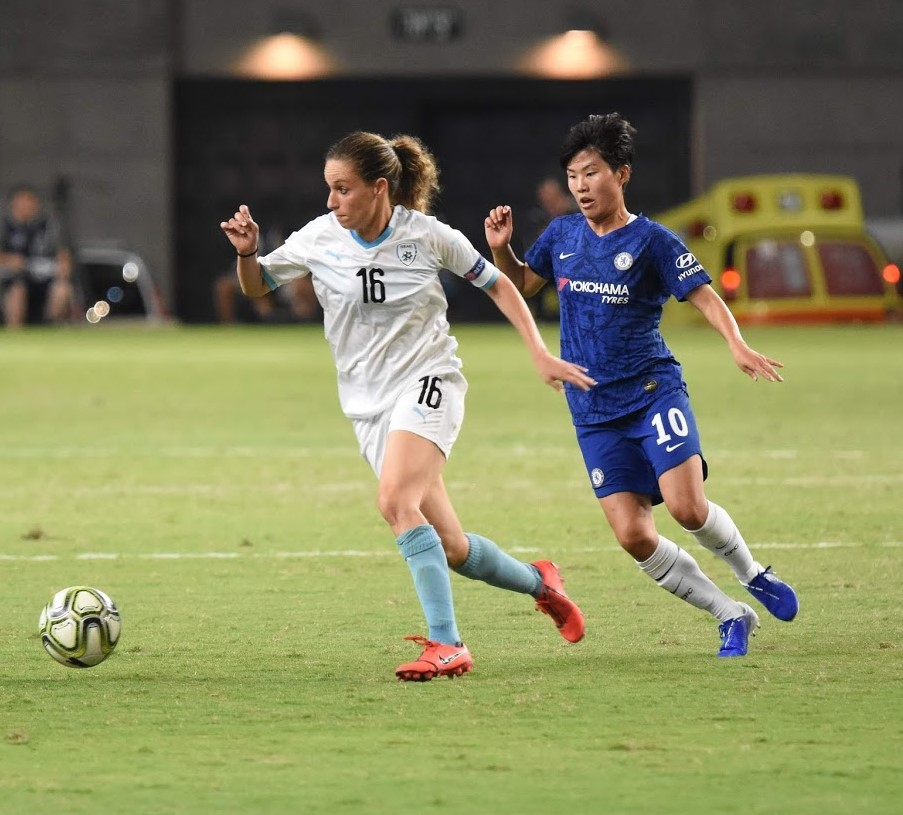
- Sendel (left) playing for Israel in 2019

Personal information
- Full name: Karin Sendel
- Date of birth: 26 October 1988 (age 38)
- Place of birth: Rishon LeZion, Israel
- Height: 1.70 m (5 ft 7 in)
- Position: Midfielder

Team information
- Current team: Hapoel Tel Aviv

College career
Years	Team	Apps	(Gls)
2009–2010	Ohio State Buckeyes	31	(1)
2011–2012	UNC Greensboro Spartans	38	(3)

Senior career*
Years	Team	Apps	(Gls)
? – 2008	Maccabi Holon		
2008	Stjarnan	16	(0)
2008–2013	Maccabi Holon	29	(6)
2013	Fylkir	7	(1)
2013–2014	Maccabi Holon	12	(3)
2014–2023	Ramat HaSharon	176	(9)
2023–	Hapoel Tel Aviv	21	(1)

International career^{‡}
2004–2006	Israel U19	12	(1)
2005–	Israel	69	(1)
- * Club domestic league appearances and goals ‡ National team caps and goals as of 2 December 2023

Karin Sendel (Hebrew: קארין סנדל; born 26 October 1988) is an Israeli women's footballer who plays as a midfielder for Ligat Nashim club FC Ramat HaSharon. She has previously played for Maccabi Holon, as well as having spells in the NCAA, with both the Ohio State Buckeyes and the UNC Greensboro Spartans, and in Iceland. She is the captain of the Israel national team, where she made her debut at the 2007 World Cup Qualifiers.

== Early life ==
Sendel was born in Rishon LeZion and raised in Kiryat Tivon to an Ashkenazi Jewish family. Her sister is Israeli actress, singer, and television host Shiran Sendel.

== Club career ==
Sendel started playing football with a local team in Kiryat Tiv'on, later moving to play for Maccabi Holon, with which she played intermittently until 2014 and won 6 championships and 8 cups, as well as appearing in Uefa Women's Cup for a total of 11 matches. In 2008 Sendel signed to play for Stjarnan in Iceland, making a total of 16 appearances for the club, before returning to play for Maccabi Holon in Israel.

In 2009 Sendel moved to the U.S. and attended Ohio State University, playing for the Ohio State Buckeyes. Two years later Sendel started attending the University of North Carolina and played for the UNC Greensboro Spartans. During this period Sendel was still registered with Maccabi Holon and played a handful of matches with the club each season.

In 2013 Sendel once again transferred to Iceland, this time playing for Fylkir's women's team in the Icelandic second division, aiding the team achieving promotion to the top division, after which Sendel return to Maccabi Holon. At the beginning of the 2014–15 season Sendel transferred from Maccabi Holon to F.C. Ramat HaSharon.

In September 2023, Sendel joined Hapoel Tel Aviv.

== International career ==
Sendel made her debut for the Israel women's national football team in 2005 against Moldova and so far played 69 matches for the national team. Sendel also played for the U-19 national team, making 12 appearances between 2004 and 2006, scoring one goal

== Personal life ==
Sendel is bisexual. She was in a relationship with the actor Israel Oglebo, the winner of the ninth season of Big Brother in Israel. In July 2023, Sandal married her female partner basketball player Hadar Refael, but the two had separated in less than a year.

Her older sister is actress and presenter Shiran Sendel, and actress Shira Levy is her cousin.

== Honours ==
- Championships (6):
  - 2002–03, 2004–05, 2005–06, 2006–07, 2007–08, 2008–09
- Cup (8):
  - 2002–03, 2003–04, 2004–05, 2005–06, 2006–07, 2007–08, 2008–09, 2012–13
- Icelandic Second Division (1):
  - 2013
