= Dovrat van Ouwerkerk =

Israeli footballer

Dovrat van Ouwerkerk דברת ואן אווורקרק
Personal information
- Full name: Dovrat van Ouwerkerk
- Date of birth: 1 May 1986 (age 40)
- Place of birth: Israel
- Position: Striker

Team information
- Current team: F.C. Kiryat Gat
- Number: 77

Senior career*
Years	Team	Apps	(Gls)
1999–2002	Maccabi Tel Aviv		(229)
2002–2007	Maccabi Holon		(186)
2007–2008	Hapoel Petah Tikva	9	(34)
2008–2011	Real Sociedad	31	(62)
2011–2013	Hapoel Petah Tikva	35	(53)
2013	Maccabi Kishronot Hadera	16	(43)
2014	Maccabi Be'er Sheva	21	(28)
2014–2015	Hapoel Petah Tikva	23	(32)
2015–	F.C. Kiryat Gat	33	(67)

International career
2002	Israel U19	3	(2)
2002–2008	Israel	7	(0)
- * Club domestic league appearances and goals

Dovrat Van Ouwerkerk (née Bendel) (Hebrew: דברת ואן אווורקרק) is an Israeli football striker currently playing in the Israeli First League for F.C. Kiryat Gat. She played the European Cup with Maccabi Holon and she has been a member of the Israeli national team; she made her debut in the 2003 World Cup qualifying against Romania.

== Club career ==
Bendel started her career at the age of 14, joining Maccabi Tel Aviv. In 2002, after Maccabi Tel Aviv had folded, Bendel joined Maccabi Holon, where she stayed until 2007. Bendel scored the first goal for Maccabi Holon in the championship match in 2003, helping the team to beat Maccabi Haifa 2–1. On 14 September 2003, while playing for Israel against Kazakhstan, Bendel injured her right knee and was out for the remainder of the season. Bendel returned the next season, but injured her right knee again on 26 September 2004, in an Israel U-19 practice before the 2005 UEFA Women's Under-19 Championship qualifying tournament and once again missed the rest of the season, as well as the following season.

In summer 2007, Bendel transferred from Maccabi Holon to Hapoel Petah Tikva, where she played two matches before being loaned to ASA Tel Aviv University. On 25 June 2008, Bendel injured her right knee again in a match against Austria, and briefly quit football.

From the years 2008–2011, Bendel played in the Spanish league, with Real Sociedad. She finished three years with the most goals and was called up to the Spanish national team as well.

Bendel returned to Israeli football in 2011 and re-joined Hapoel Petah Tikva, where she played for the next two seasons. In 2013–14, Bendel was loaned to Maccabi Kishronot Hadera and later to Maccabi Be'er Sheva, and returned to Hapoel Petah Tikva at the end of the season. In January 2015, Bendel was loaned to F.C. Kiryat Gat.

== International career ==
Bendel made her debut in Israel women's national football team in 2002 against Romania but was limited to seven matches for the national team due to her injuries. Bendel also played for the U-19 national team, making three appearances and scoring two goals, all during 2003 UEFA Women's Under-19 Championship qualifying tournament.

== Personal life ==
In 2013, Dovrat Bendel started a relationship with Levie van Ouwerkerk when she joined her team Maccabi Hadera. In 2018, they decided to formalize their relationship, and in 2019, Levie and Dovrat signed a partnership contract with the New Family Organization. As part of the partnership contract, Dovrat changed her name to Dovrat van Ouwerkerk, which is Levie's original surname.

== Honours ==
- Championships (4):
  - With Maccabi Holon: 2002–03, 2005–06, 2006–07
  - With Kiryat Gat S.C: 2016–17,
- Cup (4):
  - With Maccabi Holon: 2002–03, 2005–06, 2006–07
  - With Kiryat Gat S.C: 2015–16
