= Or Erez =

Israeli footballer

Or Erez אור ארז
Personal information
- Full name: Or Erez
- Date of birth: 7 September 1982 (age 44)
- Place of birth: Petah Tikva, Israel
- Position: Midfielder

Team information
- Current team: Hapoel Ironi Petah Tikva
- Number: 10

Senior career*
Years	Team	Apps	(Gls)
1999–2001	Hapoel Petah Tikva		
2001–2018	Maccabi Holon		
2018–	Hapoel Ironi Petah Tikva	12	(18)

International career^{‡}
2001–2002	Israel U19	10	(0)
2006–2014	Israel	34	(2)
- * Club domestic league appearances and goals as of 26 February 2019 ‡ National team caps and goals as of 7 May 2014

Or Erez (Hebrew: אור ארז; born 7 September 1982) is an Israeli footballer who plays as a midfielder for Liga Neumit club Hapoel Ironi Petah Tikva. She previously played for Maccabi Holon, with which she has also played in the European Cup. She is a member of the Israeli national team, where she made her debut in the 2007 World Cup qualifying. She has scored two goals for Israel, including a winner over Kazakhstan in the 2011 World Cup qualifying.

== Club career ==
Erez started her career in Hapoel Petah Tikva before transferring to Maccabi Holon, where she played ever since. With Maccabi Holon Erez won 6 championships and 9 cups, including scoring the winning goal in the 2003 cup final.

== International career ==
Erez made her international debut for Israel women's national football team in 2006 against Estonia and so far played a total of 31 matches for the national team, scoring two goals. Erez also played for the U-19 national team, making ten appearances and scoring two goals.

== Honours ==
- Championships (6):
  - With Maccabi Holon: 2002–03, 2004–05, 2005–06, 2006–07, 2007–08, 2008–09
- Cup (9):
  - With Maccabi Holon: 2002–03, 2003–04, 2004–05, 2005–06, 2006–07, 2007–08, 2008–09, 2009–10, 2012–13
