= Shirley Ohana =

Israeli footballer

Shirley Ohana שירלי אוחנה
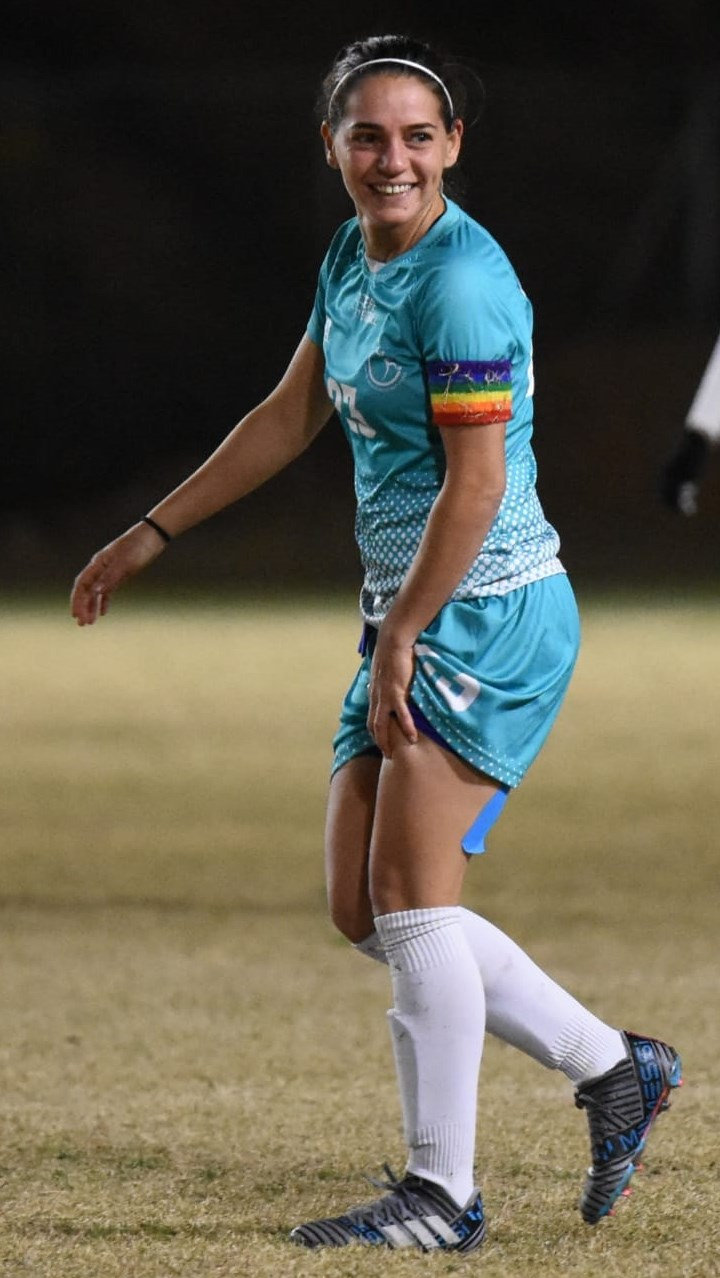

Personal information
- Full name: Shirley Ohana
- Date of birth: 29 December 1983 (age 42)
- Place of birth: Israel
- Position: Forward

Team information
- Current team: ASA Tel Aviv University
- Number: 25

Senior career*
Years	Team	Apps	(Gls)
1999–2002	Maccabi Haifa		
2002–2014	Maccabi Holon		
2014–15	Maccabi Kishronot Hadera	23	(20)
2015–	ASA Tel Aviv University	22	(14)

International career^{‡}
2001	Israel u-19	6	(2)
2002–2010	Israel	25	(7)
- * Club domestic league appearances and goals as of 19 June 2016 ‡ National team caps and goals as of 19 June 2016

Shirley Ohana (or Shirli, Hebrew: שירלי אוחנה; born 29 December 1983) is an Israeli footballer currently playing for ASA Tel Aviv University as a forward, having previously played for Maccabi Haifa, Maccabi Holon and Maccabi Kishronot Hadera. She was a member of the Israel national team, since making her debut in 2002, against Poland. Ohana played with both Maccabi Haifa and Maccabi Holon at UEFA Women's Cup.

== Honours ==
- Championships (8):
  - With Maccabi Haifa: 1998–99, 2001–02
  - With Maccabi Holon: 2002–03, 2004–05, 2005–06, 2006–07, 2007–08, 2008–09
- Cup (12):
  - With Maccabi Haifa: 1998–99, 1999–2000, 2001–02
  - With Maccabi Holon: 2002–03, 2003–04, 2004–05, 2005–06, 2006–07, 2007–08, 2008–09, 2012–13
  - with Maccabi Kishronot Hadera: 2014–15

== Personal life ==
Ohana has a female partner and a child. She works in the Israeli Postal Company.
