= Sivan Fahima =

Israeli football player

Sivan Fahima סיון פחימה
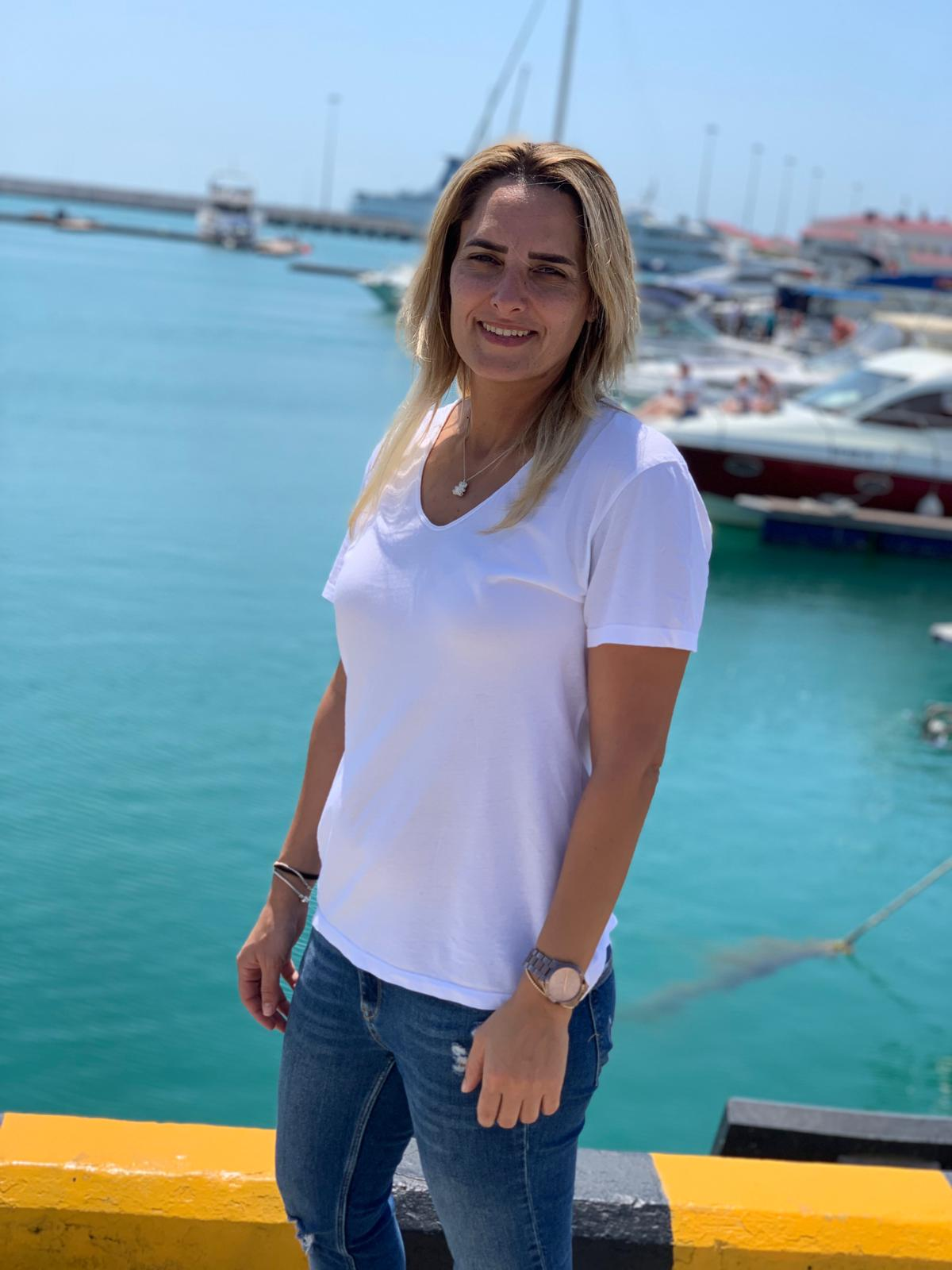
- Fahima in 2019

Personal information
- Full name: Sivan Fahima
- Date of birth: 7 September 1983 (age 43)
- Place of birth: Ashkelon, Israel
- Position: Defender

Team information
- Current team: F.C. Kiryat Gat
- Number: 19

Senior career*
Years	Team	Apps	(Gls)
1999–2003	Maccabi Haifa		
2003–2014	Maccabi Holon		
2014–	F.C. Kiryat Gat	24	(10)

International career
2001	Israel U19	6	(2)
2001–2009	Israel	27	(2)
- * Club domestic league appearances and goals

Sivan Fahima (or Pahima, Hebrew: סיון פחימה; born 7 September 1983) is an Israeli football player. She plays as a defender for the Israeli national team. She had also played in for Maccabi Holon in the 2003–04 UEFA Women's Cup.

== Club career ==
Fahima started her career in Maccabi Haifa until the team folded in 2003 and Fahima transferred to Maccabi Holon, where she played until 2014, when she moved to F.C. Kiryat Gat.

Throughout her career, Fahima won 6 championships and 11 cups, scoring a total of six goals in cup finals, including a hat-trick in 2009 cup final. Fahima was joint top scorer in the 2012–13 cup, scoring 4 goals throughout the competition.

== International career ==
Fahima made her international debut for Israel women's national football team in 2001 against Estonia and played a total of 19 matches for the national team, scoring two goals. Fahima's last match was on 26 August 2007, also against Estonia. Fahima also played for the U-19 national team, making six appearances and scoring two goals, all during 2002 UEFA Women's Under-19 Championship qualifying tournament.

== Honours ==
- Championships (6):
  - With Maccabi Haifa: 2001–02
  - With Maccabi Holon: 2004–05, 2005–06, 2006–07, 2007–08, 2008–09
- Cup (11):
  - With Maccabi Haifa: 1998–99, 1999–2000, 2001–02
  - With Maccabi Holon: 2003–04, 2004–05, 2005–06, 2006–07, 2007–08, 2008–09, 2009–10, 2012–13
