= 2007–08 Israeli Women's Cup =

Tournament details
- Country: Israel
- Teams: 15

Final positions
- Champions: Maccabi Holon (6th title)
- Runners-up: ASA Tel Aviv University

Tournament statistics
- Matches played: 12
- Goals scored: 59 (4.92 per match)
- Top goal scorer: Meital Dayan (10)

The 2007–08 Israeli Women's Cup (Hebrew: גביע המדינה נשים, romanized: Gvia HaMedina Nashim) was the tenth season of Israel's women's nationwide football cup competition.

The competition was won, for the 6th consecutive time, by Maccabi Holon who had beaten ASA Tel Aviv University 4–3 on penalties after 1–1 in the final.

== Results ==
=== First round ===
10 January 2008	Maccabi Be'er Sheva	w/o	Hapoel Marmorek

10 January 2008	Maccabi Kishronot Hadera	4–1	Hapoel Petah Tikva	Hadera
19:00	Ma'uda 34'; Mussa 64'; Zidane 70'; Arie 86'	Report	Nigerker 76'	Stadium: Hapoel Stadium; Referee: Erez Papir

10 January 2008	Maccabi Tzur Shalom Bialik	1–5	Bnot Sakhnin	Yokneam
20:00	Hajaj 38'	Report	Hussein 6' (pen.), 7', 55'; Zubidat 60'; Abu Shanab 80'	Referee: Tom Adi

10 January 2008	ASA Tel Aviv University	7–0	Bnot Caesarea Tiv'on	Tel Aviv
19:30	Dayan 13' (pen.), 56', 59', 78'; Bendel 22'; Yorman 33'; Lavi 34'	Report		Stadium: Tel Aviv University; Referee: Eli Shalian

=== Quarter-finals ===
3 April 2008	F.C. Ramat HaSharon	0–5	ASA Tel Aviv University	Ramat HaSharon
19:00		Report	Dayan 16', 28', 31'; Twil 56' (pen.); Fridman 75'	Stadium: Grundman Stadium; Referee: Mario Saluki

4 April 2008	Maccabi Be'er Sheva	2–3	Maccabi Kishronot Hadera	Be'er Sheva
13:45	Peretz 53', 69'	Report	Mussa 3'; Sofer 19'; Awisat 85' (pen.)	Stadium: Neve Noy; Referee: Tomer Cohen

4 April 2008	Bnot Sakhnin	0–10	Maccabi Holon	Sakhnin
14:30		Report	V. Cohen 10', 17'; Ohana 15', 42', 86'; Erez 16', 38', 44'; Shino 39'; Eni 83'	Stadium: Doha Stadium; Referee: Tomer Refaeli

4 April 2008	Hapoel Be'er Sheva	6–0	Hapoel Rishon LeZion	Be'er Sheva
15:00	Yachas 35', 82'; Masuri 54', 68', 85'; Gavriel 63' (o.g.)	Report		Stadium: Vasermil Stadium; Referee: Gal Leibovich

=== Semi-finals ===
15 April 2008	Maccabi Kishronot Hadera	1–7	Maccabi Holon	Ness Ziona
17:00	Mussa 66'	Report	Ohana 21', 34'; Erez 32'; V. Cohen 44', 78'; Eni 65' (pen.); Tzuberi 88'	Stadium: Ness Ziona Stadium; Referee: Rachel Cohen

15 April 2008	ASA Tel Aviv University	5–0	Hapoel Be'er Sheva	Ness Ziona
19:00	Dayan 22' (pen.), 51', 69'; Twil 47', 62'	Report		Stadium: Ness Ziona Stadium; Referee: Lilach Asulin

=== Final ===
14 April 2008
16:30

Maccabi Holon	1–1 (a.e.t.)	ASA Tel Aviv University
Erez 15'	Report	Bendel 65'
Penalties
Eni (penalty scored); V. Cohen (penalty scored); Sendel (penalty missed); Erez (penalty scored); Fahima (penalty scored)	4–3	(penalty missed) Sharabi; (penalty missed) Yahav; (penalty scored) Fridman; (penalty scored) Stein; (penalty scored) Lavie

Ness Ziona Stadium, Ness Ziona
Referee: Rachel Cohen
