= 2008–09 Israeli Women's Cup =

Tournament details
- Country: Israel
- Teams: 10

Final positions
- Champions: Maccabi Holon (7th title)
- Runners-up: ASA Tel Aviv University

Tournament statistics
- Matches played: 9
- Goals scored: 49 (5.44 per match)
- Top goal scorer: Shirley Ohana (7)

The 2008–09 Israeli Women's Cup (Hebrew: גביע המדינה נשים, Gvia HaMedina Nashim) was the 11th season of Israel's women's nationwide football cup competition.

The competition was won, for the 7th consecutive time, by Maccabi Holon who had beaten ASA Tel Aviv University 4–2 in the final.

== Results ==
=== First round ===
23 December 2008	Maccabi Be'er Sheva	3–0	Hapoel Rishon LeZion	Be'er Sheva
19:30	Ron 57'; Shaked 72'; Shahaf 85'	Report		Stadium: Neve Noy; Referee: Rachel Cohen

23 December 2008	ASA Tel Aviv University	3–1	Hapoel Petah Tikva	Tel Aviv
20:00	Israel 48'; Kerem 65'; Fridman 72'	Report	Tayar 44'	Stadium: Tel Aviv University; Referee: Avraham Constantini

=== Quarter-finals ===
1 February 2009	Bnot Sakhnin	1–5	ASA Tel Aviv University	Ilut
19:00	Abu Shanab 59'	Report	Fridman 5', 40'; Israel 21'; Maimoni 54'; Jan 88'	Stadium: Ilut Stadium; Referee: Halim Zatme

1 February 2009	Maccabi Holon	12–0	Bnot Caesarea Tiv'on	Holon
19:30	Ohana 9', 42', 47', 48', 52'; N. Cohen 28'; V. Cohen 36'; Glick 56'; Shino 84', 87', 89'; Eni 86'	Report		Stadium: Holon New Stadium; Referee: Lior Asulin

2 February 2009	Hapoel Be'er Sheva	3–2	Maccabi Be'er Sheva	Be'er Sheva
20:00	Efraim 39', 65'; Masuri 80'	Report	Peretz 57', 83'	Stadium: Vasermil Stadium; Referee: Moshe Buhbut

3 February 2009	F.C. Ramat HaSharon	1–2	Maccabi Kishronot Hadera	Ramat HaSharon
19:00	Twil 63'	Report	Mussa 25', 87'	Stadium: Grundman Stadium; Referee: Liran Liani

=== Semi-finals ===
16 April 2009	ASA Tel Aviv University	5–0	Hapoel Be'er Sheva	Ramat Gan
17:00	Belhassen 31'; Lavi 45', 61'; Israel 47' (pen.); Jan 58'	Report		Stadium: Ramat Gan Stadium; Referee: Liran Liani

16 April 2009	Maccabi Holon	5–0	Maccabi Kishronot Hadera	Ramat Gan
19:15	Ohana 14', 49'; Erez 45'; V. Cohen 51'; Shino 68'	Report		Stadium: Ramat Gan Stadium; Referee: Menashe Mashiach

=== Final ===
11 May 2009
19:30

Maccabi Holon	4–2 (a.e.t.)	ASA Tel Aviv University
Fahima 14', 28', 119'; Erez 92'	Report	Jan 25'; Lavi 90'

Ness Ziona Stadium, Ness Ziona
Referee: Lilach Asulin
