= 2018–19 Israeli Women's Cup =

Tournament details
- Country: Israel

The 2018–19 Israeli Women's Cup (Hebrew: גביע המדינה נשים, Gvia HaMedina Nashim) was the 21st season of Israel's women's nationwide football cup competition. The competition began on 25 October with one first round match.

== First round ==
Home team	Score	Away team
25 October 2018
Beitar Bnot Kfar Kanna (2)	3–0	Maccabi Be'er Sheva (2)
Hapoel Petah Tikva (2)	4–1	Beitar Ironi Ma'ale Adumim (2)
28 October 2018
Hapoel Pardesiya (2)	2–4	Maccabi Bnot Emek Hefer (2)
8 November 2018
Maccabi Tzur Shalom Bialik (2)	4–1	Hapoel Marmorek (2)

== Second round ==
Home team	Score	Away team
3 December 2018
Maccabi Bnot Emek Hefer (2)	0–3	Hapoel Ra'anana (1)
4 December 2018
Maccabi Holon (1)	1–4	Ramat HaSharon (1)
Hapoel Petah Tikva (2)	3–0	Hapoel Bnot Lod (2)
16 December 2018
Beitar Bnot Kfar Kanna (1)	0–14	Kiryat Gat (1)
29 December 2018
Maccabi Kishronot Hadera (1)	13–0	Maccabi Tzur Shalom Bialik (2)

== Quarter-finals ==
Home team	Score	Away team
10 February 2019
Ramat HaSharon (1)	2–1(aet)	Hapoel Ra'anana (1)
11 February 2019
Maccabi Kishronot Hadera (1)	2–0	Hapoel Petah Tikva (1)
Hapoel Be'er Sheva (1)	1–5	ASA Tel Aviv University (1)
Bnot Netanya (1)	0–7	Kiryat Gat (1)

== Semi-finals ==
Home team	Score	Away team
14 May 2019
Kiryat Gat (1)	0–0(a.e.t.) (6–7 p)	Maccabi Kishronot Hadera (1)
ASA Tel Aviv University (1)	2–1	Ramat HaSharon (1)

== Final ==
Home team	Score	Away team
23 May 2019
ASA Tel Aviv University (1)	3–1	Maccabi Kishronot Hadera (1)
