= 2001–02 Israeli Women's Cup =

Tournament details
- Country: Israel
- Teams: 13

Final positions
- Champions: Maccabi Haifa (3rd title)
- Runners-up: Hapoel Tel Aviv

The 2001–02 Israeli Women's Cup (Hebrew: גביע המדינה נשים, Gvia HaMedina Nashim) was the fourth season of Israel's women's nationwide football cup competition.

The competition was won by Maccabi Haifa who had beaten Hapoel Tel Aviv 5–0 in the final.

== Results ==
=== First round ===
Home team	Score	Away team
Beitar Jerusalem	0–6	Maccabi Haifa
Hapoel Be'er Sheva	w/o	Maccabi Ahi Nazareth
Hakoah Ramat Gan	3–2	Maccabi Holon
Hapoel Marmorek	0–7	Maccabi Tel Aviv
Beitar Be'er Sheva	0–2	Hapoel Petah Tikva

=== Quarter-finals ===
Home team	Score	Away team
Maccabi Tel Aviv		Hapoel Ashkelon
Hakoah Ramat Gan	1–5	Maccabi Haifa
Hapoel Be'er Sheva		Hapoel Petah Tikva
ASA Tel Aviv University		Hapoel Tel Aviv

=== Semi-finals ===
Home team	Score	Away team
Maccabi Tel Aviv		Hapoel Tel Aviv
Hapoel Be'er Sheva	0–4	Maccabi Haifa

=== Final ===
21 May 2002

Hapoel Tel Aviv	0–5	Maccabi Haifa
	1 2	Dayan; Hajaj; Ohana

Ramat Gan Stadium
