= 1998–99 Ligat Nashim =

Football season

Ligat Nashim
- Season: 1998–99
- Top goalscorer: Silvi Jan

The 1998–99 Ligat Nashim was the inaugural season of women's league football under the Israeli Football Association. The league was won by Maccabi Haifa, followed by Hapoel Tel Aviv, ASA Tel Aviv University and Maccabi Tel Aviv.

== League clubs ==
The league was played by 12 clubs:

- ASA Tel Aviv University
- Beitar Jerusalem
- Bnot Ramla
- Hapoel Ashkelon
- Hapoel Jerusalem
- Hapoel Marmorek
- Hapoel Petah Tikva
- Hapoel Tel Aviv
- Maccabi Ahi Nazareth
- Maccabi Haifa
- Maccabi Netanya
- Maccabi Tel Aviv
