= Iris Antman =

Israeli football manager and player

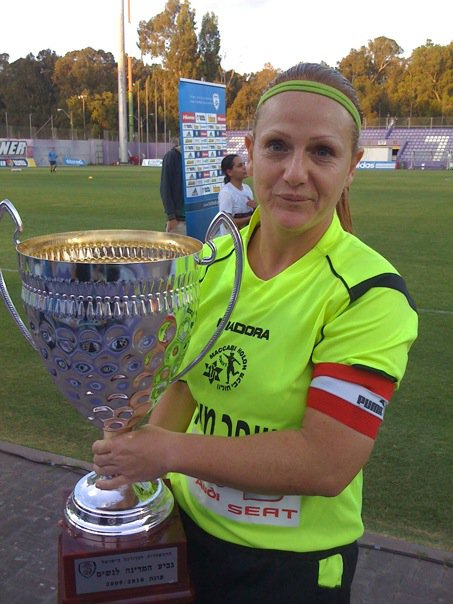
- Antman with Maccabi Holon

Personal information
- Birth name: Iris Avraham (Hebrew: איריס אברהם)
- Date of birth: 28 November 1975 (age 50)
- Position: Goalkeeper

Senior career*
Years	Team	Apps	(Gls)
2002–2004	Maccabi Haifa		(0)
2004–2005	Maccabi Holon		(0)
2005–2006	Maccabi Tzur Shalom Bialik		(0)
2006–2013	Maccabi Holon	30+	(8)
2015–2016	Girls Football Academy	13	(0)

International career^{‡}
1997–2010	Israel	48	(0)

Managerial career
- 2012–2020: Israel Women U16
- 2016–2018: Israel Women U17
- 2018–2019: Israel Women U19
- 2021–: Maccabi Kishronot Hadera U14
- 2022–2023: Hapoel Nof HaGalil men's (assistant)
- 2022–2023: Maccabi Kishronot Hadera U19
- 2023–2024: Maccabi Kishronot Hadera U17
- 2023–2024: Georgia women's national football team
- * Club domestic league appearances and goals ‡ National team caps and goals as of 25 August 2010

Iris Antman (Hebrew: איריס אנטמן, née Avraham, born 28 November 1975) is an Israeli football manager and former player. She played as a goalkeeper for Maccabi Haifa, Maccabi Holon, Maccabi Tzur Shalom Bialik, and the Israel women's national team.

== Club career ==
Antman started playing football at the age of 16, starting her playing career with Maccabi Haifa in the late 1990s, playing as a winger. An injury to the regular goalkeeper, led her to play in that position, where she stayed. During her career she won 9 league titles and 8 cups. Despite playing as a goalkeeper, she scored a few goals, including a brace as an outfield player in a league game against Hapoel Marmorek in March 2010 and with a penalty kick in the first round of the 2010–11 Israeli Women's Cup. The last game she played before announcing her retirement was with Maccabi Holon in the 2010–11 Israeli Women's Cup Final, which they lost 3–2 to ASA Tel Aviv University.

During her time at Maccabi Holon, Antman was lovingly nicknamed "Grandma", due to most of the players being much younger than her. During her career, Antman averaged up to 6 goals conceded per season.

In April 2011, Antman announced her retirement from active playing. Despite this announcement, Antman stayed with the club, and two years later played in the 2012–13 Israeli Women's Cup Final, in which Maccabi Holon beat Ramat HaSharon 7–1, being substituted on in the 82nd minute. Before the game the Israel Football Association hosted a special ceremony in honour of Antamn's retirement.

== International career ==
Antman played for the Israeli senior national team, from 1997 to 2010. She played 40 games and has served as the team captain.

== Managerial career ==
Following her retirement announcement, the Israel Football Association appointed Antman as a goalkeeping coaching for the Israeli youth national teams, both boys and girls.

In 2012 the Wingate Academy of Excellence opened for the first time and Iris was part of the coaching staff. From 2015 to 2019 she served as the coach of the girls 'under-16 team with which she won 6 development tournaments and at the same time also coached the under-17 girls' team of Israel, which for the first time qualified for the elite stage of the 2018 European Championship qualifiers for the top 16 in Europe. In 2019 she was appointed coach of the girls team up to the age of 19 and led her to promotion to the elite stage in the 2020 European Championship qualifiers for the top 16 in Europe.

Antman is the first woman to receive a pro coaching certificate in Israel and the first woman to coach a team in the Israel Football Association.

In 2019 Antman was accepted into the UEFA project mentor program of outstanding coaches and was accompanied for two years by the manager of the Switzerland women's national team, Nils Nielsen.

Antman is currently the professional director of Maccabi Kishronot Hadera.

== Sports commentator ==
Antman interprets football games on Haifa Radio, broadcast on 107.5 FM.

== Personal life ==
Antman lives in Misgav in the Galilee, and used to drive two hours to training in Holon. She is the sister-in-law of fellow Israeli former football goalkeeper and her trainer Giora Antman.
