= 1999–2000 Israeli Women's Cup =

Tournament details
- Country: Israel
- Teams: 11

Final positions
- Champions: Maccabi Haifa (2nd Title)
- Runners-up: ASA Tel Aviv University

Tournament statistics
- Matches played: 10
- Goals scored: 34 (3.4 per match)
- Top goal scorer: Silvi Jan (4)

The 1999–2000 Israeli Women's Cup (Hebrew: גביע המדינה נשים, Gvia HaMedina Nashim) was the second season of Israel's women's nationwide football cup competition.

The competition was won by Maccabi Haifa who had beaten ASA Tel Aviv University 1–0 in the final.

== Results ==
=== First round ===
28 September 1999	Maccabi Tel Aviv	1–2	Bnot Ramla	Tel Aviv
	Mesika		Ladani; Bazanos	Stadium: Kiryat Shalom; Referee: Lilach Asulin

28 September 1999	Hapoel Marmorek	3–2	Maccabi Netnaya	Rehovot
	Elimelech; Giter; Liat Amitai		Sa'ada; Mutin	Stadium: Itztoni Stadium; Referee: Eli Hachmon

2 October 1999	Hapoel Ashkelon	1–2	Maccabi Ahi Nazareth	Ashkelon
	Dayan		Halaila; Oved	Referee: Rami Ben Itzhak

=== Quarter-finals ===
8 February 2000	ASA Tel Aviv University	2–0	Hapoel Marmorek	Tel Aviv
	Kochen; Shenar			Stadium: Tel Aviv University; Referee: Lilach Asulin

8 February 2000	Maccabi Ahi Nazareth	0–5	Hapoel Tel Aviv
			Jan; Avidan

8 February 2000	Bnot Ramla	0–2	Maccabi Haifa
			Biran; Hajaj

8 February 2000	Beitar Jerusalem	1–3	Hapoel Petah Tikva
	Shuman		Erez; Conforti

=== Semi-finals ===
28 March 2000	ASA Tel Aviv University	1–0	Hapoel Tel Aviv	Bat Yam
	Shenar			Stadium: Municipal Stadium; Referee: Shai Amsili

28 March 2000	Maccabi Haifa	8–0	Hapoel Petah Tikva	Bat Yam
	Dayan; Tubul; Hajaj; Neba'a; Biran; Fahima; Kimchi			Stadium: Municipal Stadium; Referee: David Abuksis

=== Final ===
17 May 2000

ASA Tel Aviv University	0–1	Maccabi Haifa
		Hajaj

Ramat Gan Stadium
Attendance: 15000
Referee: Amichai Mozes
