= 2006–07 Israeli Women's Cup =

Tournament details
- Country: Israel
- Teams: 15

Final positions
- Champions: Maccabi Holon; 5th title
- Runners-up: ASA Tel Aviv University

Tournament statistics
- Matches played: 7
- Goals scored: 45 (6.43 per match)
- Top goal scorer: Silvi Jan (8)

The 2006–07 Israeli Women's Cup (Hebrew: גביע המדינה נשים, Gvia HaMedina Nashim) was the ninth season of Israel's women's nationwide football cup competition.

The competition was won, for the 5th consecutive time, by Maccabi Holon who had beaten ASA Tel Aviv University 2–0 in the final.

== Results ==
=== First round ===
Out of 7 planned matches, 6 weren't played, as clubs forfeited their matches.

9 January 2007	F.C. Ramat HaSharon	11–1	Beitar Jerusalem	Ramat HaSharon
19:00	Tovadian 16'; Otmezgine 18', 44'; Twil 28', 38'; Arbeitman 30', 54'; Cohen 50'; Sade 71'; Mizrahi 77'; Rabinas 78'	Report	Ben Ezra 85'	Stadium: Grundman Stadium; Referee: Liran Liani

9 January 2007	Hapoel Be'er Sheva	w/o	Hakoah Ramat Gan

9 January 2007	Ironi Bat Yam	w/o	Maccabi Be'er Sheva

9 January 2007	Maccabi Kishronot Hadera	w/o	Bnot Hadar Yosef

9 January 2007	Maccabi Holon	w/o	Hapoel Petah Tikva

9 January 2007	ASA Tel Aviv University	w/o	Bnot Sakhnin

9 January 2007	Bnot Caesarea Tiv'on	w/o	Bnot Beit She'an

=== Quarter-finals ===
23 January 2007	Maccabi Be'er Sheva	w/o	Bnot Caesarea Tiv'on

23 January 2007	Hapoel Rishon LeZion	0–8	Maccabi Holon	Rishon LeZion
19:30		Report	Fahima 14', 45'; N. Cohen 35'; Ohana 41'; Jan 42', 61', 72'; V. Cohen 57'	Stadium: Superland West; Referee: Lital Domer

23 January 2007	Maccabi Kishronot Hadera	2–0	F.C. Ramat HaSharon	Hadera
19:30	Mussa 58', 65'			Stadium: Hapoel Stadium; Referee: Idan Leiba

24 January 2007	Hapoel Be'er Sheva	2–4	ASA Tel Aviv University	Be'er Sheva
20:00	Efraim 18'; Rahamim 65'	Report	Dayan 8'; Fridman 14'; Israel 75'; Adar 80'	Stadium: Vasermil Stadium; Referee: Ro'i Reinschreiber

=== Semi-finals ===
10 April 2007	Maccabi Be'er Sheva	0–13	Maccabi Holon	Ness Ziona
17:00		Report	Shino 11', 55'; Ohana 15', 19', 45'; Jan 32', 69', 70', 87'; N. Cohen 67', 85'; Swisa 80'; Eni 89'	Stadium: Ness Ziona Stadium; Referee: Lital Domer

10 April 2007	ASA Tel Aviv University	1–1 (a.e.t.) (5–4 p)	Maccabi Kishronot Hadera	Ness Ziona
19:00	Dayan 65'	Report	Gurfinkel 66'	Stadium: Ness Ziona Stadium; Referee: Lilach Asulin

=== Final ===
19 April 2007
17:00

Maccabi Holon	2–0	ASA Tel Aviv University
Jan 62'; Shino 63'	Report

Winter Stadium, Ramat Gan
Referee: Lilach Asulin
