= Ranin Salameh =

Israeli footballer (born 1996)

Ranin Salameh رانين سلامة
Personal information
- Date of birth: 16 August 1996 (age 30)
- Place of birth: Jerusalem
- Position: Defender

Team information
- Current team: Hapoel Marmorek
- Number: 2

Youth career
- 2011–2014: Maccabi Holon

Senior career*
Years	Team	Apps	(Gls)
2013–2020	Maccabi Holon	127	(12)
2020–2021	Hapoel Petah Tikva	13	(0)
2021–	Hapoel Marmorek	4	(0)

International career^{‡}
2017	Israel	1	(0)
- * Club domestic league appearances and goals as of 6 December 2021 ‡ National team caps and goals as of 6 December 2021

Ranin Salameh (Arabic: رانين سلامة; Hebrew: רנין סלאמה; born 16 August 1996) is an Israeli footballer who plays as a defender and has appeared for the Israel women's national team.

== Club career ==
=== Hapoel Marmorek ===
Salameh joined Hapoel Marmorek ahead of the 2021–22 Ligat Nashim.

== International career ==
Salameh has been capped for the Israel national team, appearing for the team during the 2019 FIFA Women's World Cup qualifying cycle. She made one appearance in the preliminary round, coming on as a substitute in the 65th minute of a 7–0 victory over Andorra, after Israel were already leading by 7.

== Personal life ==
Salameh is ethnically Arab.
