= Na'ama Cohen =

Israeli footballer

Na'ama Cohen נעמה כהן
Personal information
- Date of birth: 7 October 1988 (age 38)
- Position: Defender

Team information
- Current team: F.C. Kiryat Gat
- Number: 5

Senior career*
Years	Team	Apps	(Gls)
2006–2007	Ironi Bat Yam		
2007–2014	Maccabi Holon		
2014–	F.C. Kiryat Gat	23	(3)

International career^{‡}
2005–2006	Israel U19	5	(1)
2008–2014	Israel	11	(0)
- * Club domestic league appearances and goals as of 1 August 2015 ‡ National team caps and goals as of 1 August 2015

Na'ama Cohen (or Naama/Neama, Hebrew: נעמה כהן; born 7 October 1988) is an Israeli football defender, currently playing for F.C. Kiryat Gat. She is a member of the Israeli national team, having played her debut for the national team against Belarus.

== Honours ==
- Ligat Nashim (2):
  - (with Maccabi Holon) 2007–08, 2008–09
- Ligat Nashim Shniya (1):
  - (with Ironi Bat Yam) 2006–07
- Cup (4):
  - (with Maccabi Holon) 2007–08, 2008–09, 2009–10, 2012–13
