= 2012–13 Israeli Women's Cup =

Tournament details
- Country: Israel
- Teams: 8

Final positions
- Champions: Maccabi Holon (9th title)
- Runners-up: F.C. Ramat HaSharon

Tournament statistics
- Matches played: 7
- Goals scored: 38 (5.43 per match)
- Top goal scorer(s): Sivan Fahima; Shirley Ohana; Vered Cohen; Sarit Shenar (4)

The 2012–13 Israeli Women's Cup (Hebrew: גביע המדינה נשים, Gvia HaMedina Nashim) was the 15th season of Israel's women's nationwide football cup competition.

The competition was won by Maccabi Holon who had beaten F.C. Ramat HaSharon 2–0 in the final.

The Second Division League Cup was won by F.C. Kiryat Gat, who had beaten Bnot Tiv’on 4–0 in the final.

== Results ==
=== Quarter-finals ===
20 January 2013	Bnot Sakhnin	0–2	F.C. Ramat HaSharon	Sakhnin
19:00		Report	Hussein 41'; Shimrich 90'	Stadium: Doha Stadium; Referee: Omer Barbairo

20 January 2013	Maccabi Holon	8–1	Maccabi Be'er Sheva	Holon
19:00	Fahima 11', 52', 66'; Dayan 11'; Ohana 15', 23'; Machlev 85'; Vered Cohen 87'	Report	Bernardis 29'	Stadium: Holon New Stadium; Referee: Valeri Karpinski

20 January 2013	Maccabi Kishronot Hadera	2–1	Hapoel Petah Tikva	Hadera
20:00	Sofer 18'; David 90'	Report	Mor 55'	Stadium: Hapoel Stadium; Referee: Tal Kaplan

20 January 2013	Hapoel Be’er Sheva	1–11	ASA Tel Aviv University	Be'er Sheva
20:15	Rogers 77'	Report	Fridman 1'; Bercholc 9' (o.g.); Shenar 27', 31', 34', 59'; Lavi 55'; Israel 58'; Avital 71', 85'; Refaeli 90'	Stadium: Reisser Stadium; Referee: Uzi Abramov

=== Semi-finals ===
26 February 2013	F.C. Ramat HaSharon	1–1 (a.e.t.) (6–7 p)	Maccabi Kishronot Hadera	Petah Tikva
17:30	David 49' (o.g.)	Report	Nasser 11'	Stadium: HaMoshava Stadium; Referee: Ro'i Reinschreiber

26 February 2013	Maccabi Holon	1–1 (a.e.t.) (3–2 p)	ASA Tel Aviv University	Petah Tikva
20:35	Fahima 97'	Report	Israel 113' (pen.)	Stadium: HaMoshava Stadium; Referee: Orel Greenfeld
	Penalties
	Fahima (penalty scored); Sendel (penalty scored); Abu Shanab (penalty scored); Erez (penalty missed)		(penalty scored) Lavi; (penalty scored) Sade; (penalty missed) Israel; (penalty missed) Kerem; (penalty missed) Belhassen

=== Final ===
1 May 2013
19:40

Maccabi Holon	7–1	F.C. Ramat HaSharon
Sendel 17'; Ohana 21', 65'; V. Cohen 31', 54', 68'; Altori 90'	Report	Hussein 62'

HaMoshava Stadium, Petah Tikva
Referee: Meitar Shemesh

== Gvia Ligat Nashim Shniya ==
2012–13 Ligat Nashim Shniya Cup
Tournament details
- Country: Israel
- Teams: 8

Final positions
- Champions: F.C. Kiryat Gat
- Runners-up: Bnot Tiv’on

Tournament statistics
- Matches played: 7
- Goals scored: 32 (4.57 per match)
- Top goal scorer: Olga Truman (6)

=== Format ===
As the second division had 8 clubs for this season, the competition was played as a strait knock-out competition.

=== Quarter-finals ===
19 January 2013	Bnot Tiv'on	0–0 (a.e.t.) (4–3 p)	Beitar Ironi Ma'ale Adumim	Ramat HaSharon
20:45		Report		Stadium: Ramat HaSharon Synthetic Pitch; Referee: Zvia Malka
	Penalties
	Kerklies (penalty scored); R. Jeries (penalty missed); Michaeli (penalty scored); M. Jeries (penalty scored); Simon (penalty scored)		(penalty scored) Amar; (penalty scored) Sharifi; (penalty missed) Aranias; (penalty missed) Lani; (penalty scored) Halika

20 January 2013	F.C. Kafr Yasif	1–0	Bnot Eilat	Sakhnin
15:30	Khatib 11'	Report		Stadium: Doha Stadium training ground Referee: Efraim Yoavov

20 January 2013	Maccabi Tzur Shalom Bialik	4–2	Bnot Caesarea	Kiryat Bialik
19:30	Kricheli 21'; Adada 25'; Isakov 29'; Asayag 75'	Report	Karby 10'; Nisanboim 68'	Stadium: Tzur Shalom Stadium; Referee: Danny Kelz

20 January 2013	Maccabi Kfar Saba	2–4	F.C. Kiryat Gat	Kfar Saba
20:40	Asaf 17'; Vaturi 42'	Report	Truman 30'; Liraz Cohen 39'; Asulin 44', 90'	Stadium: Levita Stadium training ground Referee: Ifatch Avraham

=== Semi-finals ===
19 February 2013	F.C. Kiryat Gat	12–0	F.C. Kafr Yasif	Ramat Gan
18:30	Nigerker 1', 28' (pen.), 50'; Truman 7', 39', 50', 61'; Lugasi 10'; Asulin 21'; Liraz Cohen 64'; Liat Cohen 66'; Gavriel 78'	Report		Stadium: Ramat Gan Stadium Training Ground; Referee: Elad Cohen

19 February 2013	Maccabi Tzur Shalom Bialik	1–2	Bnot Tiv'on	Ramat Gan
20:30	Isakov 87'	Report	Hod 11' (o.g.); Almoznino 17'	Stadium: Ramat Gan Stadium Training Ground; Referee: Valeri Karpinski

=== Final ===
30 April 2013
19:00

F.C. Kiryat Gat	4–0	Bnot Tiv’on
Truman 5'; Gavriel 24'; Lugai 53'; Nigerker 68'	Report

Ramat Gan Stadium Training Ground, Ramat Gan
Referee: Nir Kochav
