= 2002–03 Ligat Nashim =

Ligat Nashim
- Season: 2002–03
- Matches: 79
- Goals: 428 (5.42 per match)

The 2002–03 Ligat Nashim was the fifth season of women's league football under the Israeli Football Association.

League play was interrupted as the clubs went on strike in protest over discrimination in budget allocation and financial difficulties. The matter was discussed in the Knesset's Committee on the Status of Women, resulting in an agreement which allowed the completion of the 2002–03 Israeli Women's Cup and the league.

The league was won by Maccabi Holon, who had beaten Maccabi Haifa 2–1 in a play-off match.

== Format changes ==
For this season the league was split into two regional divisions with 6 teams in each division, playing a double round-robin schedule, after which the two top teams are to meet in a play-off series. Eventually, the two top teams met for a single match to decide the championship.

== League table ==
=== North division ===
| Pos | Team | Pld | W | D | L | GF | GA | GD | Pts |
|---|---|---|---|---|---|---|---|---|---|
| 1 | Maccabi Haifa | 11 | 11 | 0 | 0 | 88 | 4 | +84 | 33 |
| 2 | ASA Tel Aviv University | 13 | 9 | 1 | 3 | 77 | 15 | +62 | 28 |
| 3 | Hapoel Petah Tikva | 14 | 8 | 1 | 5 | 41 | 39 | +2 | 25 |
| 4 | Maccabi Ahi Nazareth | 13 | 4 | 0 | 9 | 10 | 51 | −41 | 12 |
| 5 | Ironi Holon | 13 | 3 | 0 | 10 | 17 | 54 | −37 | 9 |
| 6 | Bnot Sakhnin | 14 | 3 | 0 | 11 | 10 | 80 | −70 | 9 |

=== South division ===
| Pos | Team | Pld | W | D | L | GF | GA | GD | Pts |
|---|---|---|---|---|---|---|---|---|---|
| 1 | Maccabi Holon | 13 | 13 | 0 | 0 | 89 | 2 | +87 | 39 |
| 2 | Hapoel Be'er Sheva | 14 | 9 | 1 | 4 | 47 | 17 | +30 | 28 |
| 3 | Beitar Jerusalem | 13 | 7 | 1 | 5 | 15 | 30 | −15 | 22 |
| 4 | Hapoel Marmorek | 13 | 5 | 0 | 8 | 15 | 40 | −25 | 15 |
| 5 | Beitar Be'er Sheva | 12 | 1 | 2 | 9 | 10 | 29 | −19 | 5 |
| 6 | Bnot Ramla | 13 | 1 | 2 | 10 | 6 | 64 | −58 | 5 |

== Play-off match ==
Maccabi Haifa and Maccabi Holon met in a single play-off match to determine the winner, Maccabi Holon winning 2–1.

| 23 May 2003 | Maccabi Holon | 2–1 | Maccabi Haifa |
| | Bendel; Jan | | Stein |
