= 2001–02 Ligat Nashim =

Ligat Nashim
- Season: 2001–02
- Matches: 182
- Goals: 1,023 (5.62 per match)

The 2001–02 Ligat Nashim was the fourth season of women's league football under the Israeli Football Association.

The league was won by Maccabi Haifa.

== League table ==
Pos	Team	Pld	W	D	L	GF	GA	GD	Pts	Qualification
1	Maccabi Haifa	26	24	1	1	171	7	+164	73	Qualification to Champions League
2	ASA Tel Aviv University	26	23	1	2	155	13	+142	70	
3	Hapoel Tel Aviv	26	23	0	3	201	15	+186	69	
4	Maccabi Tel Aviv	26	20	0	6	106	29	+77	60	
5	Hapoel Be'er Sheva	26	14	3	9	65	62	+3	45	
6	Maccabi Holon	26	14	2	10	45	38	+7	44	
7	Hakoah Ramat Gan	26	13	2	11	38	66	−28	41	
8	Maccabi Ahi Nazareth	26	12	2	12	55	70	−15	38	
9	Hapoel Marmorek	26	6	3	17	42	100	−58	21	
10	Hapoel Petah Tikva	26	5	3	18	40	105	−65	18	
11	Beitar Be'er Sheva	26	5	3	18	23	125	−102	18	
12	Bnot Ramla	26	5	0	21	29	148	−119	15	
13	Beitar Jerusalem	26	4	1	21	24	126	−102	13	
14	Hapoel Ashkelon	26	2	3	21	29	119	−90	9	
