= Adi Stein =

Israeli footballer and coach

Adi Stein עדי שטיין
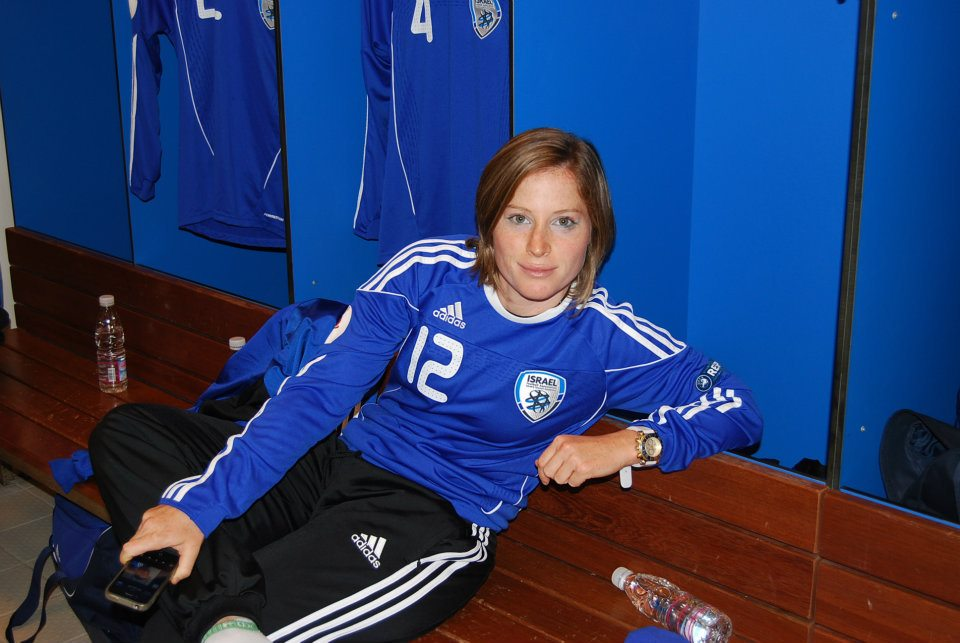

Personal information
- Full name: Adi Stein
- Date of birth: 8 October 1986 (age 40)
- Place of birth: Israel
- Position: Midfielder

Team information
- Current team: ASA Tel Aviv
- Number: 55

College career
Years	Team	Apps	(Gls)
2006–2009	West Texas A&M Lady Buffs		

Senior career*
Years	Team	Apps	(Gls)
2001–2003	Maccabi Haifa		
2003–2012	ASA Tel Aviv		

International career^{‡}
2001–2005	Israel U19	12	(1)
2006–2011	Israel	11	(0)
- * Club domestic league appearances and goals as of 7 January 2015 ‡ National team caps and goals as of 7 January 2015

Adi Stein (Hebrew: עדי שטיין) is a retired Israeli football midfielder and a football coach. Stein had played in the Israeli First League for ASA Tel Aviv, as well as in the NCAA with the West Texas A&M Buffaloes. She had played in the Champions League with Maccabi Haifa and ASA Tel Aviv. and was a member of the Israeli national team; she made her debut in the 2007 World Cup qualifying against Wales.

== Club career ==
Stein started playing with the boys' team of F.C. Neve Yosef, before moving to play with Maccabi Haifa's women team at the age of 15. Stein played for Maccabi Haifa until the club had folded, winning the league and cup.

After Maccabi Haifa had folded, Stein moved to ASA Tel Aviv University, where she had played until 2012. Between 2006 and 2009, Stein attended West Texas A&M University, and played for the university's soccer team, while still playing for ASA Tel Aviv a few matches in each season. In December 2009 Stein returned to Israel and played in ASA Tel Aviv for the next four seasons, winning the Israeli championship in each season, as well as two cups. At the end of the 2012–13 season Stein retired from active football and moved to a coaching career, coaching girls' teams in Petah Tikva and Herzliya

== International career ==
Stein made her international debut for Israel women's national football team in 2006 against Wales and played a total of 11 matches for the national team. Stein had also played for the U-19 national team, making a total of 12 appearances and scoring one goals, between 2001 and 2005.

== Honours ==
- Championships (5):
  - 2001–02 (with Maccabi Haifa), 2010–11, 2011–12, 2012–13, 2012–13 (with ASA Tel Aviv University).
- Cup (3):
  - 2001–02 (with Maccabi Haifa), 2010–11, 2011–12 (with ASA Tel Aviv University).
