= Silvi Jan =

Israeli footballer

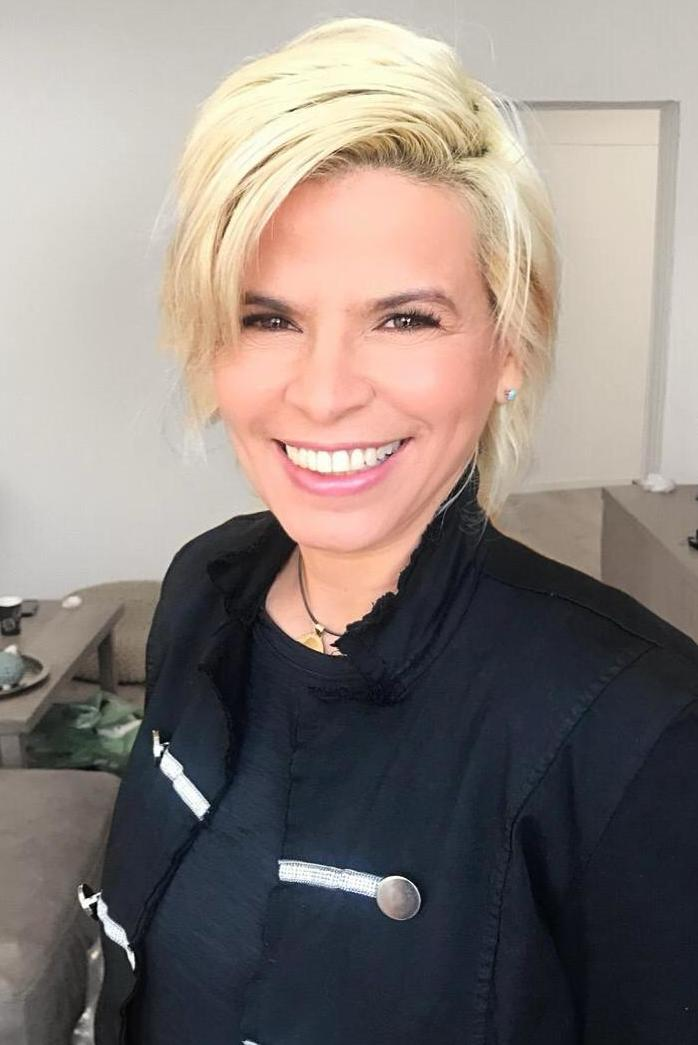
- Jan in 2020

Personal information
- Date of birth: 27 October 1973 (age 53)
- Place of birth: Netanya, Israel
- Position: Striker

Senior career*
Years	Team	Apps	(Gls)
1995–1999	Kolbotn I.L.	44	(37)
1999–2002	Hapoel Tel Aviv	67	(323)
2002–2007	Maccabi Holon	83	(353)
2009–2012	ASA Tel Aviv	60	(150)

International career
1997–2007	Israel	23	(29)
- * Club domestic league appearances and goals

Silvi Jan (Hebrew: סילבי ז'אן; born 27 October 1973) is an Israeli former footballer who played as a striker. With 29 goals, she is the all-time Israel national team top goalscorer.

== Club career ==
Jan played school football in Netanya, and was part of the boys' football team of Shorashim school. As there was no women's league, Jan tried to find an active team in Europe, eventually signing with Kolbotn I.L. in Norway. In 1999, with the establishment of the Israeli Women's League, Jan returned to Israel and signed with Hapoel Tel Aviv.

Jan played at Hapoel Tel Aviv for four seasons, until the team folded, winning the league and cup in 2000–01. After Hapoel Tel Aviv folded, Jan signed with Maccabi Holon, where she played until her retirement in 2007. With Maccabi Holon Jan won the league 4 times and the cup 5 times.

In January 2009, Jan returned to league action and joined ASA Tel Aviv University. On 21 February 2012, in a league match against her former club, Maccabi Holon, Jan scored her 1000th goal in all club and national team competitions. Jan played at ASA Tel Aviv until her retirement in May 2012. With ASA Tel Aviv Jan Jan won three championships and two cups. Jan scored a total of 1,010 goals in all competitions.

== International career ==
Silvi Jan has been a striker for the Israel national team for many years, appearing in 23 matches and scoring 29 goals. Jan made her debut against Romania on 2 November 1997, and scored her debut goal against Bosnia and Herzegovina on 8 April 2008, one of four she scored on the day.

Her last international goal was also scored against Bosnia and Herzegovina, in a match played on 23 November 2006, in which Israel won 5–2. Jan made her last international appearance against Poland on 10 May 2007.

== Career statistics ==
Club	Season	Division	League		Cup		Total	
Club	Season	Division	Apps	Goals	Apps	Goals	Apps	Goals
Kolbotn	1996	Toppserien	17	12			17	12
Kolbotn	1997	Toppserien	12	9			12	9
Kolbotn	1998	Toppserien	15	16			15	16
Kolbotn	Total		44	37			44	37
Hapoel Tel Aviv	1998-99	Ligat Nashim	12	68	3	5	15	73
Hapoel Tel Aviv	1999-00	Ligat Nashim	16	65	2	4	18	69
Hapoel Tel Aviv	2000-01	Ligat Nashim	13	101	3	7	16	108
Hapoel Tel Aviv	2001-02	Ligat Nashim	26	89	3	4	29	93
Hapoel Tel Aviv	Total		67	323	11	20	78	343
Maccabi Holon	2002-03	Ligat Nashim	10	49	3	3	13	52
Maccabi Holon	2003-04	Ligat Nashim	11	56	3	7	14	63
Maccabi Holon	2004-05	Ligat Nashim	21	94	3	5	24	99
Maccabi Holon	2005-06	Ligat Nashim	22	91	4	9	26	100
Maccabi Holon	2006-07	Ligat Nashim	19	63	3	8	22	71
Maccabi Holon	Total		83	353	16	33	99	386
ASA Tel Aviv University	2008-09	Ligat Nashim	17	33	3	3	20	36
ASA Tel Aviv University	2009-10	Ligat Nashim	20	47	1	0	21	47
ASA Tel Aviv University	2010-11	Ligat Nashim	12	36	4	7	16	43
ASA Tel Aviv University	2011-12	Ligat Nashim	11	34	3	3	14	37
ASA Tel Aviv University	Total		60	150	11	13	71	163
Career total			254	863	38	66	292	929

== International goals ==
Scores and results list Israel's goal tally first.

No.	Date	Venue	Opponent	Score	Result	Competition
1.	8 April 1998	Bat Yam, Israel	Bosnia and Herzegovina	1–0	5–0	1999 FIFA Women's World Cup qualification
2.	8 April 1998	Bat Yam, Israel	Bosnia and Herzegovina	3–0	5–0	1999 FIFA Women's World Cup qualification
3.	8 April 1998	Bat Yam, Israel	Bosnia and Herzegovina	4–0	5–0	1999 FIFA Women's World Cup qualification
4.	8 April 1998	Bat Yam, Israel	Bosnia and Herzegovina	5–0	5–0	1999 FIFA Women's World Cup qualification
5.	19 October 1999	Herzliya, Israel	Estonia	1–1	2–1	UEFA Women's Euro 2001 qualifying
6.	2 September 2001	Tallinn, Estonia	Estonia	1–0	5–2	2003 FIFA Women's World Cup qualification
7.	2 September 2001	Tallinn, Estonia	Estonia	3–0	5–2	2003 FIFA Women's World Cup qualification
8.	2 September 2001	Tallinn, Estonia	Estonia	4–0	5–2	2003 FIFA Women's World Cup qualification
9.	2 September 2001	Tallinn, Estonia	Estonia	5–0	5–2	2003 FIFA Women's World Cup qualification
10.	28 October 2001	Ramat Gan, Israel	Romania	1–0	1–0	2003 FIFA Women's World Cup qualification
11.	4 June 2002	Kyiv, Ukraine	Estonia	2–0	3–0	2003 FIFA Women's World Cup qualification
12.	7 February 2003	Unknown	Greece	1–0	1–0	Friendly
13.	12 March 2003	Unknown	Cyprus		6-1	Friendly
14.	12 March 2003	Unknown	Cyprus		6-1	Friendly
15.	12 March 2003	Unknown	Cyprus		6-1	Friendly
16.	10 August 2003	Pärnu, Estonia	Estonia	3–1	4–1	UEFA Women's Euro 2005 qualifying
17.	10 August 2003	Pärnu, Estonia	Estonia		4–1	UEFA Women's Euro 2005 qualifying
18.	9 May 2004	Tel Aviv, Israel	Estonia	4–0	12–1	UEFA Women's Euro 2005 qualifying
19.	9 May 2004	Tel Aviv, Israel	Estonia	6–0	12–1	UEFA Women's Euro 2005 qualifying
20.	9 May 2004	Tel Aviv, Israel	Estonia	9–0	12–1	UEFA Women's Euro 2005 qualifying
21.	9 May 2004	Tel Aviv, Israel	Estonia	10–1	12–1	UEFA Women's Euro 2005 qualifying
22.	9 May 2004	Tel Aviv, Israel	Estonia	12–1	12–1	UEFA Women's Euro 2005 qualifying
23.	30 May 2004	Herzliya, Israel	Kazakhstan	2–1	3–1	UEFA Women's Euro 2005 qualifying
24.	21 August 2005	Pärnu, Estonia	Estonia	1–0	5–2	2007 FIFA Women's World Cup qualification
25.	21 August 2005	Pärnu, Estonia	Estonia	2–1	5–2	2007 FIFA Women's World Cup qualification
26.	21 August 2005	Pärnu, Estonia	Estonia	3–2	5–2	2007 FIFA Women's World Cup qualification
27.	7 May 2006	Herzliya, Israel	Estonia	1–0	1–0	2007 FIFA Women's World Cup qualification
28.	11 May 2006	Chișinău, Moldova	Moldova	1–0	1–0	2007 FIFA Women's World Cup qualification
29.	18 November 2006	Sarajevo, Bosnia and Herzegovina	Latvia	1–0	3–0	UEFA Women's Euro 2009 qualifying
30.	23 November 2006	Sarajevo, Bosnia and Herzegovina	Bosnia and Herzegovina	1–0	5-2	UEFA Women's Euro 2009 qualifying

== Personal life ==
Jan came out as a lesbian in December 2017. She got engaged to her partner in November the following year.

In September 2018. Jan was diagnosed with rheumatoid arthritis.

== Honours ==
Hapoel Tel Aviv

- Ligat Nashim: 2000–01
- Israeli Women's Cup: 2000–01

Haccabi Holon

- Ligat Nashim: 2002–03, 2004–05, 2005–06, 2006–07
- Israeli Women's Cup: 2002–03, 2003–04, 2004–05, 2005–06, 2006–07

ASA Tel Aviv University

- Ligat Nashim: 2009–10, 2010–11, 2011–12
- Israeli Women's Cup: 2010–11, 2011–12

Individual

- Ligat Nashim top goalscorer: 1999–2000, 2006–07, 2009–10, 2010–11, 2011–12
- Israeli Women's Cup top goalscorer: 1999–2000, 2000–01, 2006–07, 2011–12
