= Meital Dayan =

Israeli football defender (born 1979)

Meital Dayan מיטל דיין
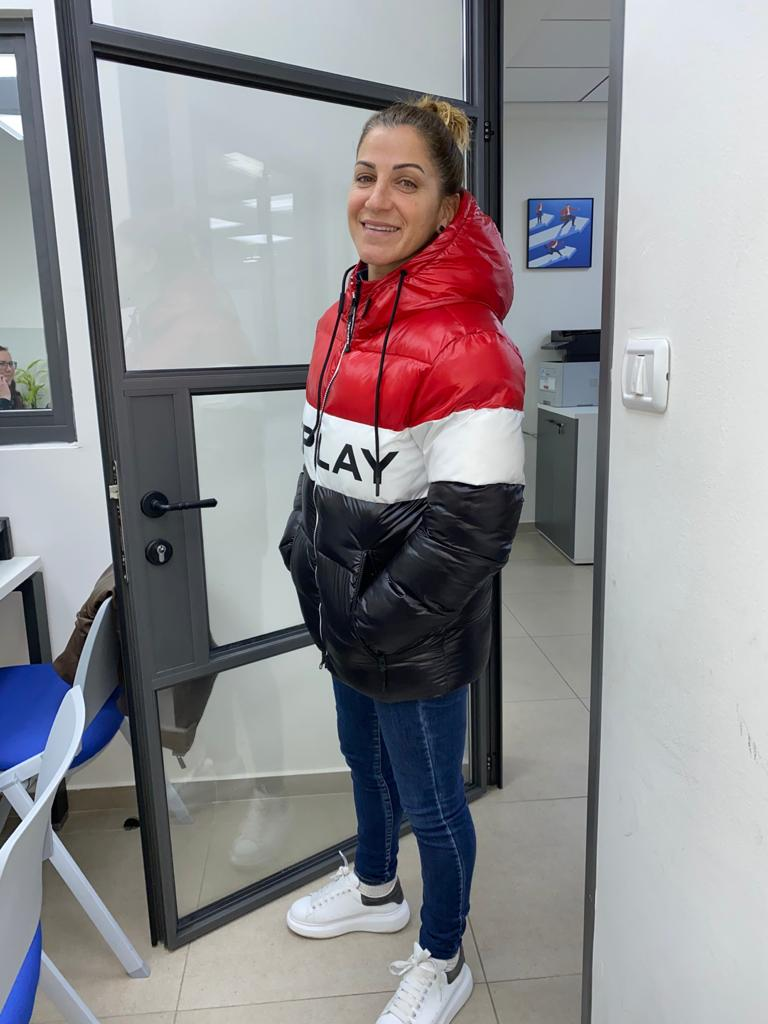
- Meital Dayan in 2019

Personal information
- Date of birth: 25 April 1979 (age 47)
- Place of birth: Israel
- Position: Forward

Team information
- Current team: Maccabi Holon
- Number: 9

Senior career*
Years	Team	Apps	(Gls)
1998–2003	Maccabi Haifa		
2003–2009	ASA Tel Aviv University		
2009–	Maccabi Holon	103	(56)
2014	→ Maccabi Be'er Sheva (loan)	10	(1)

International career^{‡}
1998–2008	Israel	29	(4)
- * Club domestic league appearances and goals as of 7 November 2015 ‡ National team caps and goals as of 7 November 2015

Meital Dayan (Hebrew: מיטל דיין; born 25 April 1979) is an Israeli football defender.

== Club career ==
Dayan had played in the Israeli First League since its inception in 1998, first with Maccabi Haifa and later with ASA Tel Aviv University and Maccabi Holon. During her club career, Dayan won 2 championship titles and 5 national cups and played in the UEFA Women's Champions League with Maccabi Haifa in 2002.

== International career ==
Dayan played for the national team since 1998, appearing in 29 matches and scoring 4 goals.

== Personal life ==
Dayan is living in Kiriat-Bialik with a female partner. She works participated in a realty TV show in Israel in 2019.

== Honours ==
- Championships (2):
  - With Maccabi Haifa: 1998–99, 2001–02
- Cup (5):
  - With Maccabi Haifa: 1998–99, 1999–2000, 2001–02
  - With Maccabi Holon: 2009–10, 2012–13
