= Levie van Ouwerkerk =

Dutch-Israeli footballer

Levie van Ouwerkerk לביאה ואן אוורקרק
Personal information
- Date of birth: 8 August 1991 (age 35)
- Place of birth: Netherlands
- Position: Forward

International career^{‡}
Years	Team	Apps	(Gls)
2018	Israel	1	(0)
- ‡ National team caps and goals as of 7 December 2021

Levia Van Ouwerkerk (or Van Eurek, Hebrew: לביאה ואן אוורקרק; born 8 August 1991) is a Dutch-Israeli footballer who plays as a forward and has appeared for the Israel women's national team.

Levie Van Ouwerkerk was born in the Netherlands, to a Christian family. Her great-grandparents hid a Jewish girl during the Holocaust. Ouwerkerk's family immigrated to Israel in 2009.

She has been capped for the Israel national team, appearing for the team during the 2019 FIFA Women's World Cup qualifying cycle.

In 2013, Levie Van Ouwerkerk started a relationship with Dovrat Bendel when she joined her team Maccabi Hadera. In 2018, they decided to formalize their relationship, and in 2019, Levie and Dovrat signed a partnership contract with the New Family Organization. As part of the partnership contract, Dovrat changed her name to Dovrat Van Ouwerkerk, which is Levie's original surname.
