= Shanoska Young =

Jamaican footballer (born 1989)

Personal information
- Full name: Shanoska Rozanne Young
- Date of birth: 26 April 1989 (age 37)
- Place of birth: Kingston, Jamaica
- Height: 1.68 m (5 ft 6 in)
- Position: Forward

Youth career
- Flanagan Falcons

College career
Years	Team	Apps	(Gls)
2007–2008	St. Thomas University Bobcats		
2009–2011	Nova Southeastern Sharks		

Senior career*
Years	Team	Apps	(Gls)
2016–2017	Maccabi Kishronot Hadera	21	(4)
2017	ŽNK Split		
2018	FC Surge	1	(0)
2018–2019	Maccabi Holon	22	(1)

International career^{‡}
2014	Jamaica	1	(0)
- * Club domestic league appearances and goals as of 5 May 2019 ‡ National team caps and goals as of 18 October 2014

Shanoska Rozanne Young (born 26 April 1989) is a Jamaican footballer who plays as a forward for the Jamaica women's national team. She also holds an American passport.

== College career ==
Young attended St. Thomas University and Nova Southeastern University, both in Florida, United States.

== International career ==
Young capped for Jamaica at senior level during the 2014 CONCACAF Women's Championship.
