= 2002–03 Israeli Women's Cup =

Tournament details
- Country: Israel
- Teams: 11

Final positions
- Champions: Maccabi Holon
- Runners-up: Maccabi Haifa

Tournament statistics
- Matches played: 10
- Goals scored: 61 (6.1 per match)

The 2002–03 Israeli Women's Cup (Hebrew: גביע המדינה נשים, Gvia HaMedina Nashim) was the fifth season of Israel's women's nationwide football cup competition.

The competition was won by Maccabi Holon who had beaten Maccabi Haifa 3–2 after extra time in the final.

== Results ==
=== First round ===
Home team	Score	Away team
Bnot Sakhnin	0–16	Maccabi Haifa
Hapoel Be'er Sheva	3–1	Beitar Jerusalem
ASA Tel Aviv University	5–0	Hapoel Marmorek

=== Quarter-finals ===
Home team	Score	Away team
Maccabi Holon	3–2 (a.e.t.)	ASA Tel Aviv University
Hapoel Petah Tikva	0–7	Maccabi Haifa
Beitar Be'er Sheva	0–2	Hapoel Be'er Sheva
Bnot Ramla	2–1 (a.e.t.)	Ironi Holon

=== Semi-finals ===
Home team	Score	Away team
Maccabi Haifa	13–0	Bnot Ramla
Hapoel Be'er Sheva	0–1	Maccabi Holon

=== Final ===
27 May 2003

Maccabi Holon	3–2 (a.e.t.)	Maccabi Haifa
Jan 28'; Eni 55'; Erez 116'	Report; Report; Report	Fahima 57'; Prelin 86' (o.g.)

Ramat Gan Stadium
