= Roni Shimrich =

Israeli footballer

Roni Shimrich רוני שמריך
Personal information
- Date of birth: 15 August 1993 (age 33)
- Place of birth: Israel
- Position: Midfielder

Team information
- Current team: Hapoel Marmorek
- Number: 10

Youth career
- 2006–2009: Maccabi Holon

Senior career*
Years	Team	Apps	(Gls)
2009–2012	Maccabi Holon	42	(17)
2012–2017	Ramat HaSharon	98	(35)
2017–2019	Hapoel Ra'anana	37	(15)
2019–2021	Ramat HaSharon	27	(5)
2021–	Hapoel Marmorek	4	(1)

International career^{‡}
2009	Israel U17	5	(0)
2010–2011	Israel U19	8	(1)
2014–	Israel	19	(0)
- * Club domestic league appearances and goals as of 6 December 2021 ‡ National team caps and goals as of 6 December 2021

Roni Shimrich (Hebrew: רוני שמריך; born 15 August 1993) is an Israeli footballer who plays as a midfielder and has appeared for the Israel women's national team.

== Career ==
Shimrich has been capped for the Israel national team, appearing for the team during the 2019 FIFA Women's World Cup qualifying cycle.
