= Yarden Malka Ozel =

Israeli association football player

Personal information
- Native name: ירדן מלכה אוזל

Sport
- Sport: Association football
- Club: Hapoel Jerusalem FC

Yarden Malka Ozel (Hebrew: ירדן מלכה אוזל; born February 11, 2001) is an Israeli professional football player who plays as a striker for Israeli club Hapoel Jerusalem FC.

== Professional football player career ==
After being scouted at the age of 10, she joined the Hapoel Jerusalem FC Academy in 2011.

=== Youth career ===
- 2011-2015: Hapoel Jerusalem FC (Jerusalem, Israel)

=== Professional career ===
She began her professional career as a professional footballer in 2015 with her Academy Club.

- 2015-2017: Hapoel Jerusalem FC (Jerusalem, Israel) 40 goals / 14 assists
- 2017-2020: Wingate Institute (Netanya, Israel) / Hapoel Jerusalem FC (Jerusalem, Israel) 34 goals / 8 assists
- 2020-2021: ASA Tel Aviv University (Tel Aviv, Israel) 5 goals / 6 assists
- 2021-2022: F.C. Kiryat Gat (women) (Kiryat Gat, Israel) 5 goals / 6 assists
- 2022-Jan2023: Lakatamia FC (Lakatámia, Cyprus) 13 goals / 5 assists
- Jan 2023 – June 2023: Yenisey Krasnoyarsk (Russia)
- Since June 2023 -: Hapoel Jerusalem FC (Jerusalem, Israel) 16 goals / 11 assists

== Honors ==
- 2016-2017: Champion of Israel
- 2018-2019: Cup of Israel
- 2019-2020: Best goal of the year
- 2022: Best scorer of winter
