= Dana Kerem =

Israeli footballer

Dana Kerem דנה כרם
Personal information
- Full name: Dana Kerem
- Date of birth: 11 September 1986 (age 40)
- Place of birth: Israel
- Position: Defender

Team information
- Current team: ASA Tel Aviv University
- Number: 4

Senior career*
Years	Team	Apps	(Gls)
?–2002	Maccabi Tel Aviv		
2002–2006	ASA Tel Aviv University		
2006	Temple Owls	18	(0)
2006–	ASA Tel Aviv University	172	(30)

International career^{‡}
2002–2005	Israel U19	12	(0)
2005–2014	Israel	4	(0)
- * Club domestic league appearances and goals as of 1 September 2015 ‡ National team caps and goals as of 1 September 2015

Dana Kerem (Hebrew: דנה כרם; born 11 September 1986) is an Israeli football defender currently playing in the Ligat Nashim Rishona for ASA Tel Aviv University, with which she had also played in the Champions League. She was a member of the Israeli national team during the 2007 World Cup qualifying. She made her debut on 21 August 2005 against Estonia.

== Club career ==
Kerem started her career at the age of 14, joining Maccabi Tel Aviv. In 2002, after Maccabi Tel Aviv had folded, Kerem joined ASA Tel Aviv University, where she played until 2006. In summer 2006, Kerem joined Temple Owls, where she played for one season, before returning to ASA Tel Aviv University.

In her second tenure at ASA Tel Aviv, Kerem won with the club five championships and three cups, and represented the club in UEFA Women's Champions League, playing a total of 17 matches for the team between 2010 and 2014.

== International career ==
Kerem made her debut in the Israel women's national football team in 2005 against Estonia and played two other matches in the 2007 World Cup qualification. On 19 June 2014, after 8 years of absence, Kerem made a return to the national team, in a match against Denmark.

Kerem also played for the U-19 national team, making 12 appearances between 2002 and 2005.

== Honours ==
- Championships (5):
  - 2009–10, 2010–11, 2011–12, 2012–13, 2012–13
- Cup (3):
  - 2010–11, 2011–12, 2013–14
