= Naomi Belhassen =

Israeli footballer

Naomi Belhassen נעמי בלחסן
Personal information
- Date of birth: 6 April 1980 (age 46)
- Position: Defender

Senior career*
Years	Team	Apps	(Gls)
1998–2015	ASA Tel Aviv University		

International career
1998–2008	Israel	21	(0)
- * Club domestic league appearances and goals

Naomi Belhassen (Hebrew: נעמי בלחסן; born 6 April 1980) is a former Israeli football player who played as a defender for ASA Tel Aviv University and Israel.

== Honours ==
- Ligat Nashim (7): 1999–2000, 2009–10, 2010–11, 2011–12, 2012–13, 2013–14, 2014–15
- Israeli Women's Cup (3): 2010–11, 2011–12, 2013–14
