= Victoria Graiver =

Israeli footballer and futsal player

Victoria Graiver ויקטוריה גרייבר
Personal information
- Date of birth: 19 September 1989 (age 37)
- Place of birth: Buenos Aires, Argentina
- Position: Midfielder

Team information
- Current team: Hapoel Ironi Petah Tikva
- Number: 9

Senior career*
Years	Team	Apps	(Gls)
- Hebraica Buenos Aires
- River Plate (futsal)
2013–2014	F.C. Ramat HaSharon	19	(3)
2014–2016	ASA Tel Aviv University	40	(7)
2016–2017	Hapoel Ironi Petah Tikva	23	(2)
2017	Kiryat Gat	0	(0)
2018–	Hapoel Ironi Petah Tikva	27	(8)

International career^{‡}
2016	Israel	1	(0)
- * Club domestic league appearances and goals as of 19 February 2019 ‡ National team caps and goals as of 21 January 2016

Victoria Graiver (Hebrew: ויקטוריה גרייבר; born 19 September 1989) is a footballer and futsal player who plays as a midfielder for Liga Neumit club Hapoel Ironi Petah Tikva. Born in Argentina, she represented Israel internationally.

An Argentine Jew, Graiver represented Argentina at the 2013 Maccabiah Games. After that, she stayed in Israel, where she started a professional career and played once for its women's national team in 2016.

== International career ==
Graiver made her senior debut for Israel on 21 January 2016 in a 0–0 friendly draw against Ukraine.
