= Shai Pearl =

Israeli footballer (born 1997)

Shai Pearl שי פרל
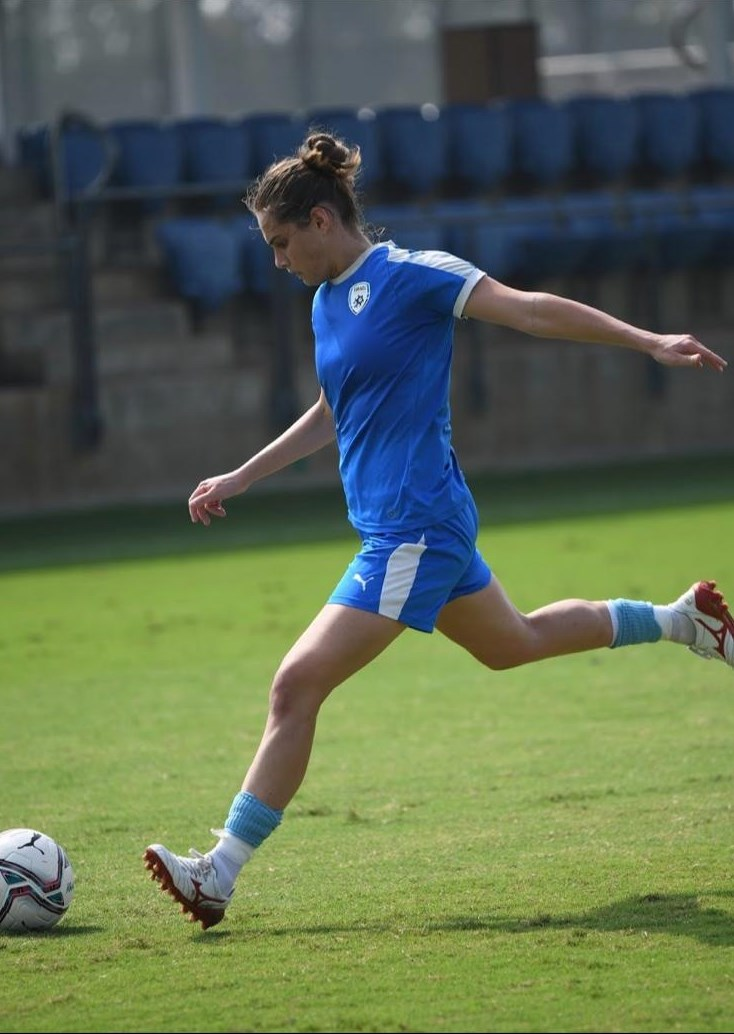
- Pearl in 2019

Personal information
- Date of birth: 1 March 1997 (age 29)
- Place of birth: Petah Tikva, Israel
- Position: Defender

Youth career
- 2009–2013: Hapoel Petah Tikva
- 2012–2014: Girls Football Academy

Senior career*
Years	Team	Apps	(Gls)
2012–2013	Hapoel Petah Tikva	28	(4)
2014–2015	Girls Football Academy	23	(12)
2015–2017	Hapoel Petah Tikva	24	(3)
2017	Ramat HaSharon	8	(0)
2017–2018	Hapoel Ra'anana	14	(4)
2018–2019	Hapoel Petah Tikva	9	(7)
2019–2022	Ramat HaSharon	17	(2)
2022	SC Sand	15	(1)

International career^{‡}
2012–2013	Israel U17	11	(0)
2014–2015	Israel U19	16	(0)
2014–	Israel	15	(0)
- * Club domestic league appearances and goals as of 21 June 2022 ‡ National team caps and goals as of 2 December 2021

Shai Pearl (or Shay Perel, Hebrew: שי פרל; born 1 March 1997) is an Israeli footballer who plays as a defender for the Israel women's national team.

== Club career ==
In February 2022, Pearl joined German Bundesliga club SC Sand. 2.5 months later, she scored her first goal for the club in a 3–3 draw with TSG 1899 Hoffenheim.

== International career ==
Pearl has been capped for the Israel national team, appearing for the team during the 2019 FIFA Women's World Cup qualifying cycle.
