= 2004–05 Israeli Women's Cup =

Tournament details
- Country: Israel
- Teams: 15

Final positions
- Champions: Maccabi Holon (3rd title)
- Runners-up: ASA Tel Aviv University

Tournament statistics
- Matches played: 12
- Goals scored: 73 (6.08 per match)

The 2004–05 Israeli Women's Cup (Hebrew: גביע המדינה נשים, Gvia HaMedina Nashim) was the seventh season of Israel's women's nationwide football cup competition.

The competition was won, for the third consecutive time, by Maccabi Holon, who had beaten ASA Tel Aviv University 2–1 in the final.

== Results ==
=== First round ===
Home team	Score	Away team
Hapoel Rishon LeZion	0–2	Ironi Bat Yam
Hapoel Petah Tikva	2–1	Bnot Haifa
Ironi Be'er Sheva	1–3	Hapoel Be'er Sheva
Ironi Holon	1–5	ASA Tel Aviv University
Maccabi Kishronot Hadera	w/o	Bnot Beit She'an
Hapoel Marmorek	w/o	Bnot Kiryat Gat
Maccabi Be'er Sheva	0–16	Maccabi Holon

=== Quarter-finals ===
Matches were played on 9 May 2005.

Home team	Score	Away team
Ironi Bat Yam	4–2	Hapoel Marmorek
Hapoel Petah Tikva	1–0	Bnot Hadar Yosef
Beitar Be'er Sheva	0–6	Maccabi Holon
ASA Tel Aviv University	5–1	Maccabi Kishronot Hadera

=== Semi-finals ===
Home team	Score	Away team
ASA Tel Aviv University	10–0	Hapoel Petah Tikva
Ironi Bat Yam	0–10	Maccabi Holon

=== Final ===
9 June 2005

Maccabi Holon	2–1	ASA Tel Aviv University
Eni 3'; Ohana 86'	Report	Wolf 48'

Bat Yam Municipal Stadium
