= 2006–07 Ligat Nashim =

Ligat Nashim
- Season: 2006–07
- Matches: 132
- Goals: 650 (4.92 per match)
- Top goalscorer: Silvi Jan (63)

The 2006–07 Ligat Nashim was the ninth season of women's league football under the Israeli Football Association.

The league was won by Maccabi Holon, its fourth consecutive title. By winning, Maccabi Holon qualified to 2007–08 UEFA Women's Cup. The second division was won by Ironi Bat Yam.

== Ligat Nashim Rishona ==
=== League table ===
Pos	Team	Pld	W	D	L	GF	GA	GD	Pts	Qualification or relegation
1	Maccabi Holon	22	22	0	0	183	4	+179	66	Qualified to UEFA Women's Cup
2	ASA Tel Aviv University	22	20	0	2	105	11	+94	60	
3	Maccabi Kishronot Hadera	22	16	2	4	81	34	+47	50	
4	F.C. Ramat HaSharon	22	13	3	6	69	29	+40	42	
5	Hapoel Be'er Sheva	22	9	4	9	53	45	+8	31	
6	Maccabi Tzur Shalom Bialik	22	6	7	9	37	53	−16	25	
7	Hapoel Ironi Petah Tikva	22	4	9	9	21	66	−45	21	
8	Bnot Sakhnin	22	5	5	12	27	83	−56	20	
9	Bnot Caesarea Tiv'on	22	5	4	13	21	83	−62	19	
10	Hapoel Rishon LeZion	22	4	3	15	18	99	−81	15 (Note: Tie-breaker for Hapoel Rishon LeZion and Maccabi Be'er Sheva: MBS – HRL 1–1; HRL – MBS 1–0)	
11	Maccabi Be'er Sheva	22	3	6	13	20	70	−50	15	Relegated to Ligat Nashim Shniya (Note: Both clubs were later reprieved from relegation, as all 5 clubs from the second division folded over the season break.)
12	Hapoel Marmorek	22	1	5	16	15	73	−58	8	Relegated to Ligat Nashim Shniya

=== Top scorers ===
Rank	Scorer	Club	Goals
1	Silvi Jan	Maccabi Holon	63
2	Shirley Ohana	Maccabi Holon	38
3	Adva Twil	F.C. Ramat HaSharon	24
4	Meital Dayan	ASA Tel Aviv University	23
4	Rim Mussa	Maccabi Kishronot Hadera	23
6	Daniel Sofer	Maccabi Kishronot Hadera	22
7	Mor Efraim	Maccabi Holon	20
8	Moran Lavi	ASA Tel Aviv University	18
9	Diana Awisat	Maccabi Kishronot Hadera	14
10	Meira Yussov	Maccabi Tzur Shalom Bialik	12
10	Inbar Zigelman	ASA Tel Aviv University	12
10	Shay Sade	F.C. Ramat HaSharon	12

== Ligat Nashim Shniya ==
Ligat Nashim Shniya
- Matches: 20
- Goals: 164 (8.2 per match)
- Top goalscorer: Maayan Kauffman (20)

=== League table ===
Pos	Team	Pld	W	D	L	GF	GA	GD	Pts
1	Ironi Bat Yam	8	7	1	0	76	0	+76	22
2	Beitar Jerusalem	8	5	2	1	51	2	+49	17
3	Bnot Beit She'an	8	3	1	4	27	22	+5	10
4	Bnot Kiryat Gat	8	2	1	5	6	71	−65	7
5	Bnot Hadar Yosef	8	0	1	7	4	69	−65	1
