= New Family Organization =

The New Family Organization was founded in 1998 in Tel Aviv, Israel, by advocate Irit Rosenblum and a group of attorneys to advocate equal family rights for all and to promote the rights of families who don't meet the de facto definition of family in Israel: a man and a woman married according to religious law. New Family Organization is Israel's leading family rights advocates and triggered precedents for legal equality for women, common-law, same-sex and interfaith families.

Rights promoted by New Family Organization include the right to live in a recognized partnership (marriage or common-law), to have children (through natural conception, adoption or via reproductive technologies), to will and inherit assets, and to dissolve a partnership, without discrimination based on faith, nationality, sexual orientation, or status.

== Founding ==
New Family Organization was established by Irit Rosenblum, an Israeli advocate and legal innovator. Rosenblum advocates a human right to establish a family regardless of gender, religion, nationality, sexual orientation and legal status. Rosenblum is an outspoken proponent of common-law partnership over legal marriage and for the right to use assisted reproductive technologies.

Rosenblum is a member of the Israeli Bar Association and served as a presiding judge in the police disciplinary court.

Through her work with New Family, she has challenged Israeli family law. This included gaining recognition for same-sex families, issuing common-law marriage IDs which are recognized in official government bodies, the Biological Will Initiative, and promoting parenthood through reproductive technologies

== Constituency ==
New Family's constituency includes people who are vulnerable to infringements on rights due to family status, such as people who can not legally marry in Israel, immigrants, interfaith and bi-national families, common-law couples, single parents, same-sex couples, people whose family status disadvantages them for adoption or for reproductive services, foreign citizens, refugees, religiously ‘forbidden’ unions, people deemed ‘ineligible’ for marriage by religious law, children deemed ‘illegitimate’ by religious law, people who do not meet the religious definition of any faith, or meet the definition of two faiths, and more.

Rights promoted by New Family include the right to marry, to have children, to access adoption services and reproductive technology, register children and spouses, to bequeath and inherit assets and to dissolve a partnership without discrimination based on faith, origin, nationality, sexual orientation, or status.

== Legal Innovations ==
A central aspect of New Family's work is innovating legal solutions that circumvent or mitigate infringements on rights in marriage and divorce by creating civil alternatives to religious authorities who have exclusive jurisdiction over family status in Israel. New Family pioneered contractual marriage and Domestic Partnership Cards, which confer legal status and rights equal to married couples on couples that cannot legally marry or do not wish to marry according to the required orthodox religious rites. Domestic Partnership Cards have been issued to thousands of couples and recognized by government authorities.

== Biological Wills ==
New Family promotes a new legal concept of biological wills which specify whether or not an individual's reproductive material may be used after their death, who may use it, how long it may be preserved, how many children may be created with it, and legal status of any resulting children. Biological wills apply property law to biological matter and assume that human reproductive material is property that can be willed and inherited like other assets. Biological wills ensure that a person's wishes for a biological legacy are legally binding. New Family founded the world's only Biological Will Bank, and is the only known organization drafting and storing biological wills.

In the landmark 2006 Keivan Cohen case, the parents of a 20-year-old soldier killed in action won the right to use the sperm retrieved after his death for posthumous reproduction after proving in court that it was his explicit wish to father children. The case, which was reported in media from around the world, was unique, both because Cohen had not left his wish in writing, and because the woman that would carry his child was not known to him during lifetime. Since then, court attitude in Israel has been changed to require written consent for posthumous reproduction.

== Activities ==
The New Family Organization runs a family rights information hotline, provides legal consultation and aid, litigates legal precedents in family rights, advocates legislation and policy for equal rights for all families, publishes family rights guidebooks, conducts research and data analysis, raises public consciousness of family rights, and more.
