= 2003–04 Israeli Women's Cup =

Tournament details
- Country: Israel
- Teams: 8

Final positions
- Champions: Maccabi Holon (2nd title)
- Runners-up: ASA Tel Aviv University

Tournament statistics
- Matches played: 7
- Goals scored: 38 (5.43 per match)

The 2003–04 Israeli Women's Cup (Hebrew: גביע המדינה נשים, Gvia HaMedina Nashim) was the sixth season of Israel's women's nationwide football cup competition.

The competition was won by Maccabi Holon who had beaten ASA Tel Aviv University 2–0 in the final.

== Results ==
=== Quarter-finals ===
Home team	Score	Away team
Maccabi Holon	3–1	Ironi Bat Yam
Ironi Jerusalem	1–5	Hapoel Petah Tikva
Beitar Be'er Sheva	3–1	Beitar Be'er Sheva
ASA Tel Aviv University	9–0	Ironi Holon

=== Semi-finals ===
The semi-finals were played on 20 April 2004. Both matches were played in Ness Ziona Stadium.

Home team	Score	Away team
ASA Tel Aviv University	5–1	Hapoel Be'er Sheva
Hapoel Petah Tikva	0–8	Maccabi Holon

=== Final ===
18 May 2004
15:30

Maccabi Holon	2–0	ASA Tel Aviv University
Fahima 24'; Shino 69'	Report

Ramat Gan Stadium
Attendance: 10000
Referee: Rachel Cohen
