= 2005–06 Israeli Women's Cup =

Tournament details
- Country: Israel

Final positions
- Champions: Maccabi Holon (4th title)
- Runners-up: ASA Tel Aviv University

The 2005–06 Israeli Women's Cup (Hebrew: גביע המדינה נשים, Gvia HaMedina Nashim) was the eighth season of Israel's women's nationwide football cup competition.

The competition was won, for the third consecutive time, by Maccabi Holon, who had beaten ASA Tel Aviv University 5–1 in the final.

== Results ==
=== Final ===
23 May 2006

Maccabi Holon	5–1	ASA Tel Aviv University
Eni 55'; Jan 62'; Ohana 82', 86'; N. Cohen 84'	Report	Israel 69'

Herzliya Municipal Stadium
