= Mor Efraim =

Israeli footballer

Mor Efraim מור אפרים
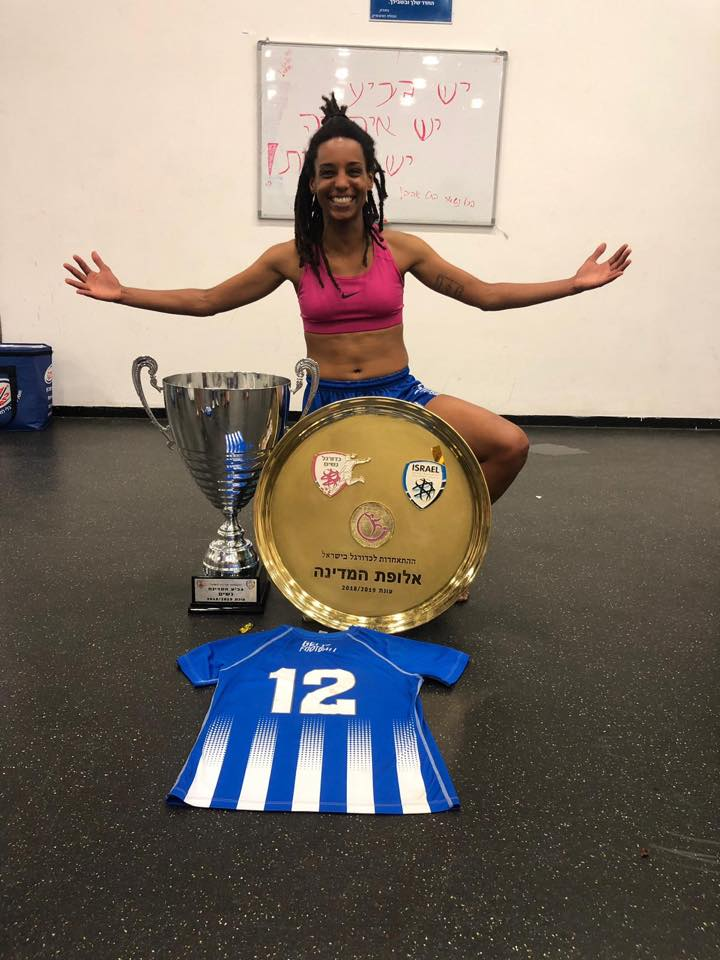
- Moore Ephraim along with the championship plate and the National Cup won at the ASA Tel Aviv uniform for the 2018/2019 season

Personal information
- Date of birth: 18 January 1988 (age 38)
- Place of birth: Nevatim, Israel
- Position: Midfielder

Team information
- Current team: ASA Tel Aviv

Senior career*
| Years | Team | Apps | (Gls) |
- ASA Tel Aviv

International career^{‡}
| 2004–2006 | Israel U19 | 8 | (2) |
| 2015–2019 | Israel | 8 | (1) |
- * Club domestic league appearances and goals as of 31 August 2019 ‡ National team caps and goals as of 29 November 2021

Mor Efraim (or Effraim, Hebrew: מור אפרים; born 18 January 1988) is an Israeli footballer who plays as a midfielder and has appeared for the Israel women's national team.

== Career ==
Efraim has been capped for the Israel national team, appearing for the team during the UEFA Women's Euro 2021 qualifying cycle.

== International goals ==
| No. | Date | Venue | Opponent | Score | Result | Competition |
|---|---|---|---|---|---|---|
| 1. | 12 November 2019 | Sammy Ofer Stadium, Haifa, Israel | Bosnia and Herzegovina | 1–0 | 1–3 | UEFA Women's Euro 2022 qualifying |
