= Beitar Jerusalem F.C. (women) =

Beitar Jerusalem
- Full name: Beitar Jerusalem Women's Football Club בית״ר ירושלים נשים
- Nickname: The Menorah
- Short name: Beitar בית״ר
- Founded: 1998 / 2019
- Dissolved: 2007
- Ground: Teddy Stadium, Jerusalem
- Capacity: 31,733
- Owner: Moshe Hogeg
- Chairman: Eli Ohana
- League: Israeli 2nd Division
Home colours	Away colours

Beitar Jerusalem (Hebrew: בית״ר ירושלים) is an Israeli women's football club from Jerusalem, which play in Israeli women's league and the Israeli Women's Cup. The club is affiliated with Beitar Jerusalem Football Club and played its matches in the club's training ground in Bayit VeGan neighborhood.

== History ==
The club was among the first to be established in Israel, as the IFA set up the women's league. The club played in the league until 2007, except for the 2003–04 season, when, due to financial difficulties the club was briefly disbanded. In 2005–06 the club finished third from bottom in the league, and was placed in the newly formed second division for the following season. The club was finished second in the league and was due to promotion to the top division. However, the club withdrew from the league and disbanded.

In the Israeli Women's Cup, the club's best achievement was in 2000, in which the club played at the quarter-finals stage.

In 2007 the club was dissolved and was re-established in April 2019, to participate in the 2019–20 season of the Israeli Women's League 3rd division and in its first season promoted to the 2nd division.

== Titles ==
Runners-up:

- Israeli 2nd Division (1)
  - 2006–07
