= Vered Cohen =

Israeli footballer

Vered Cohen ורד כהן
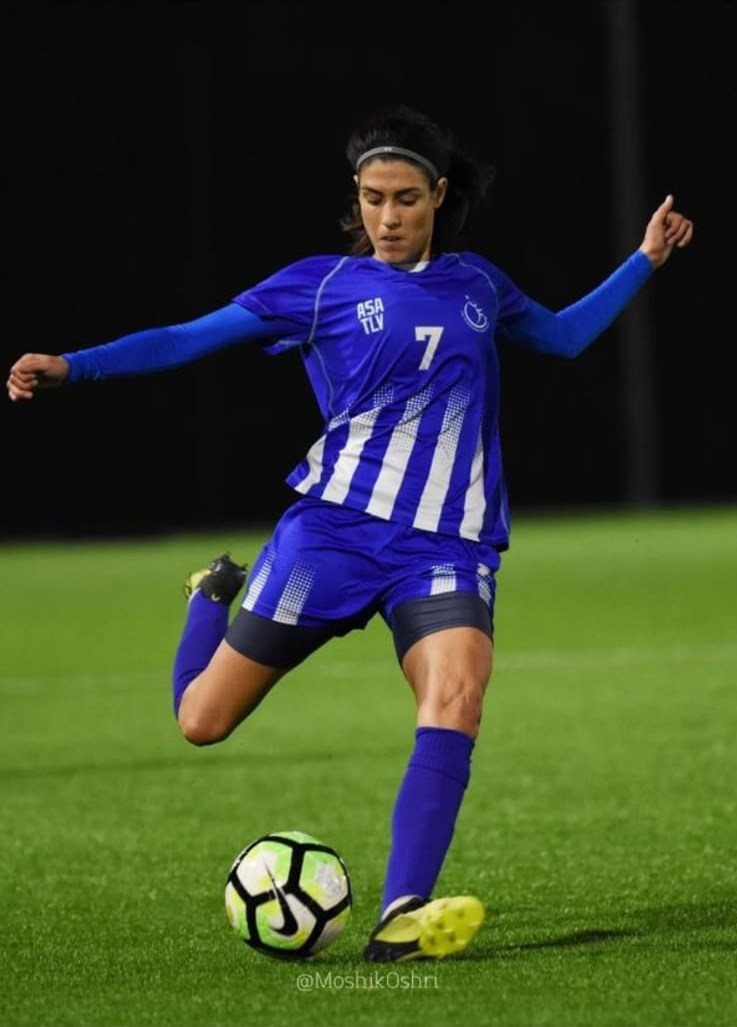

Personal information
- Date of birth: 23 May 1988 (age 38)
- Place of birth: Rishon LeZion, Israel
- Position: Midfielder

Team information
- Current team: ASA Tel Aviv

Senior career*
Years	Team	Apps	(Gls)
- ASA Tel Aviv

International career^{‡}
2004–2006	Israel U19	11	(4)
2005–2019	Israel	11	(2)
- * Club domestic league appearances and goals as of 31 August 2019 ‡ National team caps and goals as of 28 November 2021

Vered Cohen (Hebrew: ורד כהן; born 23 May 1988) is an Israeli footballer who plays as a midfielder and has appeared for the Israel women's national team.

== Career ==
Cohen has been capped for the Israel national team, appearing for the team during the UEFA Women's Euro 2021 qualifying cycle.
