= Maccabi Haifa F.C. (women) =

Maccabi Haifa
- Full name: Maccabi Haifa Women's Football Club מכבי חיפה נשים
- Founded: 1998
- Dissolved: 2004
- League: Ligat Nashim Rishona

Maccabi Haifa (Hebrew: מכבי חיפה) was an Israeli women's football club from Haifa. The club competed in the Israeli First League and the Israeli Women's Cup, winning two championships and three cups. and competing in 2002–03 UEFA Women's Cup.

== History ==
The club was established by its parent club Maccabi Haifa in January 1998, as part of the initiative to set up a women's football league after the establishment of the Israel women's national football team. The team was coached by Isar Ravitz, and won Israel's first two cup competitions (in 1998–99 and 1999–2000) and the first (informal) league competition in 1998.

The club regained both titles in 2001–02, this time managed by Avraham Abukarat, losing only one league match and defeating Hapoel Tel Aviv 5–0 in the cup final. As the club won the championship, it qualified to the UEFA Women's Cup, losing all its matches in group stage.

The next season the club won the northern group of the Israeli Women's League, but lost in the championship play-off match to Maccabi Holon. The two clubs also met in the cup final, where Maccabi Haifa lost 2–3.

As the club was experiencing financial difficulties, and with lack of financial and administrative support from the Israeli Football Association and The Israeli Sports Betting Council, the club ceased operations in late 2003, and was officially folded and had its players released in November 2004.

== Titles ==
- Israeli 1st League (2)
  - 1998–99, 2001–02
- Israeli 1st League Northern Division (1)
  - 2002–03
- Israeli Cup (3)
  - 1998–99, 1999–2000, 2001–02
