= Maccabi Tel Aviv F.C. (women) =

Maccabi Tel Aviv
- Full name: Maccabi Tel Aviv Women's Football Club מכבי תל אביב נשים
- Founded: 1998, 2025
- Dissolved: 2002
- League: Ligat Nashim

Maccabi Tel Aviv (Hebrew: מכבי תל אביב) is an Israeli women's football club from Tel Aviv, a sub-division of Maccabi Tel Aviv. The club competes in the Israeli First League, finishing fourth in each season so far and the Israeli Women's Cup, but folded in 2002, before being re-founded in 2025, when Maccabi merged with the ASA Tel Aviv women's football club.
