= Hapoel Marmorek F.C. (women) =

Hapoel Marmorek
- Full name: Hapoel Marmorek Women's Football Club הפועל מרמורק נשים
- Founded: 1998
- Dissolved: 2010
- Ground: Itztoni Stadium, Rehovot
- Capacity: 1,500
- Chairman: Hanan Adani
- League: Ligat Nashim Rishona
- 2009–10: 12th

Hapoel Marmorek (Hebrew: הפועל מרמורק) was an Israeli women's football club from the city of Rehovot, part of the Hapoel Marmorek Football Club. The club competed in the Israeli First League and the Israeli Women's Cup.

At the end of 2006–07 Ligat Nashim the club finished bottom of the first division and was due to relegate to the second division, but since all the second division clubs folded, the club retained its position in the first (and only) division for the next season. However, an agreement between the club and Ironi Bat Yam (who was due to be promoted to the first division) revealed that Hapoel Marmorek offered to buy Bat Yam's place in the first division in exchange for 85,000 NIS. Later the agreement was changed so the club would be buying 9 of Bat Yam's players, while Bat Yam will fold. The club was put to trial by the IFA, and in July 2009 the club was banned by the IFA. As the club appealed, it was allowed to participate in the 2009–10 season, after which the club folded.
