= Israeli Women's Cup =

- Organiser(s): Israel Football Association (IFA)
- Founded: 1998; 28 years ago
- Region: Israel
- Teams: 20 (2021–22)
- Current champions: F.C. Kiryat Gat (2nd title)
- Most championships: Maccabi Holon (9 titles)
- 2021–22 Israeli Women's Cup

The Israeli Women's Cup (Hebrew: גביע המדינה נשים, Gvia HaMedina Nashim) is the annual knock-out tournament of women's football teams in Israel. It is equivalent to the men's Israel State Cup, and organized by the Israel Football Association (IFA). Its first season was played in 1998–99. As of 2020 Maccabi Holon had won the most titles, winning for the ninth time in 2012–13.

== Format ==
The competition is a knockout tournament which includes all members of Ligat Nashim, the Israeli women's football league. Each tie is played as a single leg. If a match is drawn, the game is settled with extra time and penalty shootouts.

== List of finals ==
The list of finals:

Season	Winners	Result	Runner-up
1998–99	Maccabi Haifa	1–1 (a.e.t.) (5–4 p.)	Hapoel Tel Aviv
1999–2000	Maccabi Haifa	1–0	ASA Tel Aviv University
2000–01	Hapoel Tel Aviv	4–3	Maccabi Haifa
2001–02	Maccabi Haifa	5–0	Hapoel Tel Aviv
2002–03	Maccabi Holon	3–2	Maccabi Haifa
2003–04	Maccabi Holon	2–0	ASA Tel Aviv University
2004–05	Maccabi Holon	2–1	ASA Tel Aviv University
2005–06	Maccabi Holon	5–1	ASA Tel Aviv University
2006–07	Maccabi Holon	2–0	ASA Tel Aviv University
2007–08	Maccabi Holon	1–1 (a.e.t.) (4–3 p.)	ASA Tel Aviv University
2008–09	Maccabi Holon	4–2	ASA Tel Aviv University
2009–10	Maccabi Holon	5–0	Maccabi Be'er Sheva
2010–11	ASA Tel Aviv University	3–2	Maccabi Holon
2011–12	ASA Tel Aviv University	2–0	Maccabi Kishronot Hadera
2012–13	Maccabi Holon	7–1	F.C. Ramat HaSharon
2013–14	ASA Tel Aviv University	2–1	Maccabi Kishronot Hadera
2014–15	Maccabi Kishronot Hadera	1–0 (a.e.t.)	ASA Tel Aviv University
2015–16	F.C. Kiryat Gat	1–0	ASA Tel Aviv University
2016–17	ASA Tel Aviv University	2–1	Maccabi Kishronot Hadera
2017–18	F.C. Ramat HaSharon	3–2 (a.e.t.)	F.C. Kiryat Gat
2018–19	ASA Tel Aviv University	3–1	Maccabi Kishronot Hadera
2019–20	Abandoned due to the COVID-19 pandemic in Israel		
2020–21	F.C. Kiryat Gat	2–1	Maccabi Emek Hefer

== Ligat Nashim Shniya Cup ==
For three seasons, between 2010–11 and 2012–13, the IFA arranged a cup competition for Ligat Nashim Shniya.

Season	Winners	Result	Runner-up
2010–11	Hapoel Be'er Sheva	7–1	Maccabi Kishronot Hadera B
2011–12	F.C. Ramat HaSharon	5–0	Bnot Caesarea Tiv'on
2012–13	F.C. Kiryat Gat	4–0	Bnot Caesarea Tiv'on

== See also ==
- Israel State Cup, men's equivalent
- Sport in Israel
  - Football in Israel
    - Women's football in Israel
      - Ligat Nashim
- Israel women's national football team
  - Israel women's national football team results
  - List of Israel women's international footballers
- Israel women's national under-19 football team
- Israel women's national under-17 football team
- Israel national football team
