= Maccabi Holon F.C. (women) =

Maccabi Holon
- Full name: Maccabi Holon Football Club מכבי חולון
- Founded: 1999
- Ground: Municipal Stadium, Holon
- Capacity: 3,500
- Chairman: Efraim Reber
- Manager: Netanela Hajaj
- League: Ligat Nashim
- 2019–20: 6th
Home colours	Away colours

Maccabi Holon is an Israeli women's football club from Holon competing in the Israeli First League and the Israeli Women's Cup. Maccabi dominated Israeli women's football through much of the 2000s, winning six championships and seven cups between 2003 and 2010, including five doubles in a row. It has represented Israel in the UEFA Women's Cup in seven occasions. In recent years it has been surpassed by ASA Tel Aviv.

== History ==
The club was established in 1999 under the name Maccabi Ironi Holon and joined the league in its second season, finishing 11th. In 2002, after the collapse of Maccabi Tel Aviv and Hapoel Tel Aviv, the club signed several of their top players, allowing it to challenge for titles, eventually winning both league and cup. The club signed more top players after the collapse of Maccabi Haifa a year later, and went on to win all league titles and cups until 2009, after which the club remained at the top of Israeli women's football, and managed to win two cups, in 2009–10 and 2012–13, while finishing as runners-up three times in the league.

== Honours ==
- Israeli 1st League (6)
  - 2002–03, 2004–05, 2005–06, 2006–07, 2007–08, 2008–09
- Israeli Cup (9)
  - 2002–03, 2003–04, 2004–05, 2005–06, 2006–07, 2007–08, 2008–09, 2009–10, 2012–13

== UEFA competitions record ==
Season	Competition	Stage	Result	Opponent
2003–04	UEFA Women's Cup	Qualifying Stage	0–4	(Ukraine) Lehenda Chernihiv
			1–6	(Sweden) Malmö
			1–3	(Finland) United Jakobstad
2004–05	UEFA Women's Cup	Qualifying Stage	0–0	(Romania) Clujana
			1–1	(Spain) Athletic Bilbao
			2–2	(Northern Ireland) Newtownabbey Strikers
2005–06	UEFA Women's Cup	Qualifying Stage	6–0	(Cyprus) AEK Kokkinochorion
			1–8	(Ukraine) Arsenal Kharkiv
			0–1	(Poland) Wroclaw
2006–07	UEFA Women's Cup	Qualifying Stage	1–1	(Greece) PAOK
			5–0	(Cyprus) AEK Kokkinochorion
			0–3	(Ukraine) Lehenda Chernihiv
2007–08	UEFA Women's Cup	Qualifying Stage	5–1	(Cyprus) AEK Kokkinochorion
			0–3	(Romania) Clujana
			3–4	(Czech Republic) Sparta Prague
2008–09	UEFA Women's Cup	Qualifying Stage	1–1	(Slovakia) Slovan Duslo Šaľa
			2–1	(Wales) Cardiff City
			0–9	(Iceland) Valur
2009–10	Champions League	Qualifying Stage	0–4	(Cyprus) Apollon Limassol
			2–0	(Republic of Ireland) St. Francis
			0–7	(Russia) Rossiyanka
