= Hapoel Petah Tikva F.C. (women) =

Hapoel Ironi Petah Tikva
- Full name: Hapoel Ironi Petah tikva Football Club הפועל עירוני פתח תקווה
- Founded: 1998
- Ground: HaMoshava Stadium, Petah Tikva
- Capacity: 11,500
- Manager: Reuven Katz
- League: First Division (I)
- 2024–25: Ligat Nashim, 5th
Home colours	Away colours

Hapoel Ironi Petah Tikva (Hebrew: הפועל עירוני פתח תקווה) is an Israeli women's football club from Petah Tikva competing in the Israeli First League and the Israeli Women's Cup.

== History ==
The club was established in 1998 and competed in the league ever since, usually finishing in mid-table. In the cup, the club had reached the semi-finals 4 times, most recently in 2011.

== Current squad ==
Note: Flags indicate national team as defined under FIFA eligibility rules; some limited exceptions apply. Players may hold more than one non-FIFA nationality.

No.	Pos.	Nation	Player
1	GK	ISR	Marom Keren
4	MF	ISR	Mor Shaked
5		ISR	Tal Isaev
6		ISR	Odel Vagas
8		ISR	Noa Simchi
10		ISR	Maya Chitman
11		ISR	Roni Levi
14		ISR	Gil Havazelet

No.	Pos.	Nation	Player
15		ISR	Katty Azrayv
16		ISR	Ofri Eliyahu
17	DF	ISR	Daniel Sofer
19		ISR	Adi Ben Ezra
23	DF	GHA	Edem Atovor
24		ISR	Tal Sofer
99	FW	JAM	Shakira Duncan
—	MF	ISR	Eden Avital
