= 2016–17 in Israeli football =

Football in Israel
- Season: 2016–17

Men's football
- Premier League Women's Premier: Hapoel Be'er Sheva; F.C. Kiryat Gat
- Liga Leumit Women's Leumit: Maccabi Netanya; Hapoel Ra'anana
- State Cup Women's Cup: Bnei Yehuda; ASA Tel Aviv University
- Toto Cup Al: Hapoel Be'er Sheva
- Super Cup: Hapoel Be'er Sheva

The 2016–17 season was the 69th season of competitive football in Israel, and the 91st season under the Israeli Football Association, established in 1928, during the British Mandate.

== Promotion and relegation ==
=== Pre–season ===
| League | Promoted to League | Relegated from League |
|---|---|---|
| Premier League | F.C. Ironi Ashdod; Hapoel Ashkelon | Hapoel Acre; Maccabi Netanya |
| Liga Leumit | Ironi Nesher; Maccabi Sha'arayim | Maccabi Yavne; Maccabi Kiryat Gat |
| Liga Alef | Tzeirei Kafr Kanna; Hapoel Robi Shapira Haifa; F.C. Bnei Jaffa Ortodoxim; F.C. Dimona; F.C. Tira | Maccabi Sektzia Ma'alot-Tarshiha; Ihud Bnei Majd al-Krum; Maccabi Amishav Petah Tikva; Bnei Eilat; Hapoel Morasha Ramat HaSharon |
| Liga Bet | F.C. Julis; Maccabi Tzeirei Shefa-'Amr; Hapoel Bnei Ar'ara 'Ara; Hapoel Tirat HaCarmel; Hapoel Ihud Bnei Jatt; Shimshon Tel Aviv; Nordia Jerusalem; Maccabi Ashdod; Hapoel Kiryat Yam (Note: Hapoel Kiryat Yam (From Liga Gimel) merged with Maccabi Ironi Acre (from Liga Bet), and as consequence was promoted to Liga Bet.); Maccabi Ironi Sderot (Note: Maccabi Ironi Sderot was promoted to fill a vacancy after Hapoel Morasha Ramat HaSharon folded.) | Ahi Bir al-Maksur; Hapoel Bnei Maghar; Ihud Bnei Baqa; F.C. Pardes Hanna-Karkur; Hapoel Tzafririm Holon; Ironi Beit Dagan; Hapoel Merhavim; Hapoel Rahat |
| Ligat Nashim (women) | Maccabi Be'er Sheva | Bnot Netanya |

== IFA competitions ==
=== League competitions ===
==== 2016–17 Israeli Premier League ====
| Pos | Team | Pld | W | D | L | GF | GA | GD | Pts | Qualification |
|---|---|---|---|---|---|---|---|---|---|---|
| 1 | Hapoel Be'er Sheva (C, Q) | 36 | 26 | 7 | 3 | 73 | 18 | +55 | 85 | Qualification for the Champions League second qualifying round |
| 2 | Maccabi Tel Aviv (Q) | 36 | 22 | 6 | 8 | 61 | 28 | +33 | 72 | Qualification for the Europa League first qualifying round |
| 3 | Beitar Jerusalem (Q) | 36 | 16 | 12 | 8 | 53 | 36 | +17 | 60 | Qualification for the Europa League first qualifying round |
| 4 | Maccabi Petah Tikva | 36 | 15 | 11 | 10 | 42 | 34 | +8 | 56 | |
| 5 | Bnei Sakhnin | 36 | 13 | 9 | 14 | 32 | 46 | −14 | 48 | |
| 6 | Maccabi Haifa | 36 | 12 | 9 | 15 | 34 | 41 | −7 | 45 | |

Source: Israel Football Association, Soccerway
Rules for classification: 1) Points; 2) Goal difference; 3) Matches won; 4) Goals scored; 5) Head-to-head points; 6) Head-to-head goal difference; 7) Head-to-head goals scored; 8) Play-off.
(C) Champions; (Q) Qualified for the phase indicated

| Pos | Team | Pld | W | D | L | GF | GA | GD | Pts | Relegation |
|---|---|---|---|---|---|---|---|---|---|---|
| 7 | Ironi Kiryat Shmona | 33 | 10 | 9 | 14 | 44 | 48 | −4 | 39 | |
| 8 | Hapoel Haifa | 33 | 10 | 7 | 16 | 39 | 46 | −7 | 37 | |
| 9 | F.C. Ashdod | 33 | 7 | 15 | 11 | 22 | 32 | −10 | 36 | |
| 10 | Hapoel Ra'anana | 33 | 9 | 9 | 15 | 22 | 40 | −18 | 36 | |
| 11 | Bnei Yehuda (Q) | 33 | 8 | 11 | 14 | 26 | 39 | −13 | 35 | Qualification for the Europa League second qualifying round (Note: Bnei Yehuda qualified for the Europa League Second qualifying round by winning the 2016–17 Israel State Cup) |
| 12 | Hapoel Ashkelon | 33 | 7 | 11 | 15 | 24 | 42 | −18 | 32 | |
| 13 | Hapoel Kfar Saba (R) | 33 | 7 | 10 | 16 | 23 | 40 | −17 | 31 | Relegation to Liga Leumit |
| 14 | Hapoel Tel Aviv (Note: Hapoel Tel Aviv were deducted nine points for entering administration.) (R) | 33 | 8 | 14 | 11 | 29 | 34 | −5 | 29 | Relegation to Liga Leumit |

Source: Israel Football Association, Soccerway
Rules for classification: 1) Points; 2) Goal difference; 3) Matches won; 4) Goals scored; 5) Head-to-head points; 6) Head-to-head goal difference; 7) Head-to-head goals scored; 8) Play-off.
(Q) Qualified for the phase indicated; (R) Relegated

==== 2016–17 Ligat Nashim ====
| Pos | Team | Pld | W | D | L | GF | GA | GD | Pts | Qualification or relegation |
|---|---|---|---|---|---|---|---|---|---|---|
| 1 | F.C. Kiryat Gat (C) | 24 | 18 | 3 | 3 | 74 | 17 | +57 | 57 | Qualification for the Champions League |
| 2 | F.C. Ramat HaSharon | 24 | 15 | 2 | 7 | 51 | 18 | +33 | 47 | |
| 3 | ASA Tel Aviv University | 24 | 14 | 3 | 7 | 56 | 38 | +18 | 45 | |
| 4 | Maccabi Kishronot Hadera | 24 | 14 | 2 | 8 | 54 | 32 | +22 | 44 | |
| 5 | Hapoel Petah Tikva | 24 | 10 | 3 | 11 | 41 | 26 | +15 | 33 | |

Updated to match(es) played on 14 May 2017. Source: Israel Football Association
Rules for classification: 1) Points; 2) Matches won; 3) Play-off.
(C) Champions

| Pos | Team | Pld | W | D | L | GF | GA | GD | Pts | Qualification or relegation |
|---|---|---|---|---|---|---|---|---|---|---|
| 6 | Maccabi Holon | 22 | 10 | 3 | 9 | 42 | 52 | −10 | 33 | |
| 7 | Youth Academy | 22 | 10 | 2 | 10 | 43 | 23 | +20 | 32 | |
| 8 | Bnot Netanya | 22 | 2 | 1 | 19 | 13 | 62 | −49 | 7 | |
| 9 | Bnot Sakhnin (R) | 22 | 1 | 1 | 20 | 9 | 115 | −106 | 4 | Relegation to Liga Leumit |

Updated to match(es) played on 14 May 2017. Source: Israel Football Association
Rules for classification: 1) Points; 2) Matches won; 3) Play-off.
(R) Relegated

=== Cup competitions ===
==== 2016–17 Israel State Cup ====
25 May 2017
21:00

| Maccabi Tel Aviv | 0–0 (a.e.t.) | Bnei Yehuda |
Penalties
| Alberman (penalty scored); Rikan (penalty scored); Kjartansson (penalty scored); Scarione (penalty missed); Benayoun (penalty missed); Ben Haim I (penalty missed) | 3–4 | (penalty missed) Valskis; (penalty scored) Jovanović; (penalty scored) Buzaglo; (penalty missed) Gordana; (penalty scored) Cohen; (penalty scored) Finish |

Teddy Stadium, Jerusalem
Attendance: 27,800
Referee: Eli Hachmon

==== 2016–17 Israeli Women's Cup ====
18 May 2017
19:40

| ASA Tel Aviv University | 2–1 | Maccabi Kishronot Hadera |
|---|---|---|
| Lavi 5', 30' (pen.) | Report | 85' Twil |

Municipal Stadium, Lod
Referee: Rachel Shakuri-Cohen

==== 2016–17 Toto Cup Al ====
28 December 2016
20:00

| Hapoel Be'er Sheva | 4–1 | Hapoel Kiryat Shmona |
|---|---|---|
| Sahar 34' (pen.), 36'; Radi 73'; Barda 90' | Report | 70' (o.g.) Turjeman |

Netanya Stadium, Netanya
Referee: Ziv Adler

==== 2016 Israel Super Cup ====
11 August 2016

| Hapoel Be'er Sheva | 4–2 | Maccabi Haifa |
|---|---|---|
| Maor Buzaglo 54', 69'; Anthony Nwakaeme 84'; Ben Sahar 90+4' | | Nikita Rukavytsya 7'; Shoval Gozlan 22' |

Netanya Stadium, Netanya

== International Club Competitions ==
=== UEFA Champions League ===
==== Second qualifying round ====
| Team 1 | Agg. | Team 2 | 1st leg | 2nd leg |
|---|---|---|---|---|
| Hapoel Be'er Sheva (Israel) | 3–2 | (Moldova) Sheriff Tiraspol | 3–2 | 0–0 |

==== Third qualifying round ====
| Team 1 | Agg. | Team 2 | 1st leg | 2nd leg |
|---|---|---|---|---|
| Olympiacos (Greece) | 0–1 | (Israel) Hapoel Be'er Sheva | 0–0 | 0–1 |

==== Play-off round ====
| Team 1 | Agg. | Team 2 | 1st leg | 2nd leg |
|---|---|---|---|---|
| Celtic (Scotland) | 5–4 | (Israel) Hapoel Be'er Sheva | 5–2 | 0–2 |

=== UEFA Europa League ===
==== First qualifying round ====
| Team 1 | Agg. | Team 2 | 1st leg | 2nd leg |
|---|---|---|---|---|
| Sloboda Tuzla (Bosnia and Herzegovina) | 0–1 | (Israel) Beitar Jerusalem | 0–0 | 0–1 |
| Maccabi Tel Aviv (Israel) | 4–0 | (Slovenia) Gorica | 3–0 | 1–0 |

==== Second qualifying round ====
| Team 1 | Agg. | Team 2 | 1st leg | 2nd leg |
|---|---|---|---|---|
| Maccabi Haifa (Israel) | 2–2 (3–5 p) | (Estonia) Nõmme Kalju | 1–1 | 1–1 (a.e.t.) |
| Kairat (Kazakhstan) | 2–3 | (Israel) Maccabi Tel Aviv | 1–1 | 1–2 |
| Beitar Jerusalem (Israel) | 3–3 (a) | (Cyprus) Omonia | 1–0 | 2–3 |

==== Third qualifying round ====
| Team 1 | Agg. | Team 2 | 1st leg | 2nd leg |
|---|---|---|---|---|
| Pandurii Târgu Jiu (Romania) | 2–5 | (Israel) Maccabi Tel Aviv | 1–3 | 1–2 |
| Jelgava (Latvia) | 1–4 | (Israel) Beitar Jerusalem | 1–1 | 0–3 |

==== Play-off round ====
| Team 1 | Agg. | Team 2 | 1st leg | 2nd leg |
|---|---|---|---|---|
| Beitar Jerusalem (Israel) | 1–2 | (France) Saint-Étienne | 1–2 | 0–0 |
| Maccabi Tel Aviv (Israel) | 3–3 (4–3 p) | (Croatia) Hajduk Split | 2–1 | 1–2 (a.e.t.) |

==== Group stage ====
===== Group D =====
| Pos | Team | Pld | W | D | L | GF | GA | GD | Pts | Qualification | ZEN | AZ | MTA | DUN |
|---|---|---|---|---|---|---|---|---|---|---|---|---|---|---|
| 1 | (Russia) Zenit Saint Petersburg | 6 | 5 | 0 | 1 | 17 | 8 | +9 | 15 | Advance to knockout phase | — | 5–0 | 2–0 | 2–1 |
| 2 | (Netherlands) AZ | 6 | 2 | 2 | 2 | 6 | 10 | −4 | 8 | Advance to knockout phase | 3–2 | — | 1–2 | 1–1 |
| 3 | (Israel) Maccabi Tel Aviv | 6 | 2 | 1 | 3 | 7 | 9 | −2 | 7 | | 3–4 | 0–0 | — | 2–1 |
| 4 | (Republic of Ireland) Dundalk | 6 | 1 | 1 | 4 | 5 | 8 | −3 | 4 | | 1–2 | 0–1 | 1–0 | — |

Source: UEFA

===== Group K =====
| Pos | Team | Pld | W | D | L | GF | GA | GD | Pts | Qualification | SPP | HBS | SOU | INT |
|---|---|---|---|---|---|---|---|---|---|---|---|---|---|---|
| 1 | (Czech Republic) Sparta Prague | 6 | 4 | 0 | 2 | 8 | 6 | +2 | 12 | Advance to knockout phase | — | 2–0 | 1–0 | 3–1 |
| 2 | (Israel) Hapoel Be'er Sheva | 6 | 2 | 2 | 2 | 6 | 6 | 0 | 8 | Advance to knockout phase | 0–1 | — | 0–0 | 3–2 |
| 3 | (England) Southampton | 6 | 2 | 2 | 2 | 6 | 4 | +2 | 8 | | 3–0 | 1–1 | — | 2–1 |
| 4 | (Italy) Internazionale | 6 | 2 | 0 | 4 | 7 | 11 | −4 | 6 | | 2–1 | 0–2 | 1–0 | — |

Source: UEFA

==== Round of 32 ====
| Team 1 | Agg. | Team 2 | 1st leg | 2nd leg |
|---|---|---|---|---|
| Hapoel Be'er Sheva (Israel) | 2–5 | (Turkey) Beşiktaş | 1–3 | 1–2 |

=== UEFA Women's Champions League ===
==== Group 6 ====
| Pos | Team | Pld | W | D | L | GF | GA | GD | Pts | Qualification | SFK | HaS | KHA | RIG |
|---|---|---|---|---|---|---|---|---|---|---|---|---|---|---|
| 1 | (Bosnia and Herzegovina) SFK 2000 (H) | 3 | 2 | 1 | 0 | 6 | 2 | +4 | 7 | Knockout phase | — | 1–0 | — | 3–0 |
| 2 | (Israel) Ramat HaSharon | 3 | 2 | 0 | 1 | 5 | 1 | +4 | 6 | | — | — | 1–0 | — |
| 3 | (Ukraine) Zhytlobud Kharkiv | 3 | 1 | 1 | 1 | 4 | 3 | +1 | 4 | | 2–2 | — | — | 2–0 |
| 4 | (Latvia) Rīgas FS | 3 | 0 | 0 | 3 | 0 | 9 | −9 | 0 | | — | 0–4 | — | — |

Source: UEFA
(H) Hosts

=== UEFA Youth League ===
==== First round (Champions Path) ====
| Team 1 | Agg. | Team 2 | 1st leg | 2nd leg |
|---|---|---|---|---|
| Maccabi Haifa (Israel) | 8–2 | (Belarus) Shakhtyor Soligorsk | 5–0 | 3–2 |

==== Second round (Champions Path) ====
| Team 1 | Agg. | Team 2 | 1st leg | 2nd leg |
|---|---|---|---|---|
| Maccabi Haifa (Israel) | 1–1 (a) | (Russia) Dynamo Moscow | 0–0 | 1–1 |

==== Play-offs ====
| Team 1 | Score | Team 2 |
|---|---|---|
| Maccabi Haifa (Israel) | 0–1 | (Germany) Borussia Dortmund |

== National Teams ==
=== National team ===
==== 2018 FIFA World Cup qualifying ====
| Pos | Team | Pld | W | D | L | GF | GA | GD | Pts | Qualification |
|---|---|---|---|---|---|---|---|---|---|---|
| 1 | Spain | 6 | 5 | 1 | 0 | 21 | 3 | +18 | 16 | Qualification to 2018 FIFA World Cup |
| 2 | Italy | 6 | 5 | 1 | 0 | 18 | 4 | +14 | 16 | Possible second round (Note: The eight best runners-up across all groups will advance to the second round (play-offs). The ninth-ranked runners-up will be eliminated.) |
| 3 | Albania | 6 | 3 | 0 | 3 | 7 | 8 | −1 | 9 | |
| 4 | Israel | 6 | 3 | 0 | 3 | 9 | 12 | −3 | 9 | |
| 5 | North Macedonia (E) | 6 | 1 | 0 | 5 | 8 | 13 | −5 | 3 | |
| 6 | Liechtenstein (E) | 6 | 0 | 0 | 6 | 1 | 24 | −23 | 0 | |

Updated to match(es) played on 11 June 2017. Source: FIFA
Rules for classification: Qualification tiebreakers
(E) Eliminated

==== 2016–17 matches ====
| Date | Competition | Opponent | Venue | Result | Scorers |
|---|---|---|---|---|---|
| 5 September 2016 | 2018 World Cup Qual. | Italy | Sammy Ofer Stadium, Haifa | 1–3 | Ben Haim II |
| 6 October 2016 | 2018 World Cup Qual. | North Macedonia | Philip II Arena, Skopje | 2–1 | Hemed, Ben Haim II |
| 9 October 2016 | 2018 World Cup Qual. | Liechtenstein | Teddy Stadium, Jerusalem | 2–1 | Hemed (2) |
| 12 November 2016 | 2018 World Cup Qual. | Albania | Elbasan Arena, Elbasan | 3–0 | Zahavi, Einbinder, Atar |
| 24 March 2017 | 2018 World Cup Qual. | Spain | El Molinón, Gijón | 1–4 | Refaelov |
| 6 June 2017 | Friendly | Moldova | Netanya Stadium, Netanya | 1–1 | Sahar |
| 11 June 2017 | 2018 World Cup Qual. | Albania | Sammy Ofer Stadium, Haifa | 0–3 | |

=== Women's National Team ===
==== 2017 Women's Euro qualification (group 8) ====
| Pos | Team | Pld | W | D | L | GF | GA | GD | Pts | Qualification |
|---|---|---|---|---|---|---|---|---|---|---|
| 1 | Norway | 8 | 7 | 1 | 0 | 29 | 2 | +27 | 22 | Final tournament |
| 2 | Austria | 8 | 5 | 2 | 1 | 18 | 4 | +14 | 17 | Final tournament |
| 3 | Wales | 8 | 3 | 2 | 3 | 13 | 11 | +2 | 11 | |
| 4 | Kazakhstan | 8 | 1 | 1 | 6 | 2 | 30 | −28 | 4 | |
| 5 | Israel | 8 | 0 | 2 | 6 | 2 | 17 | −15 | 2 | |

Source: UEFA
Rules for classification: Qualification tiebreakers

==== 2019 Women's World Cup qualification (preliminary round) ====
| Pos | Team | Pld | W | D | L | GF | GA | GD | Pts | Qualification |
|---|---|---|---|---|---|---|---|---|---|---|
| 1 | Israel | 3 | 2 | 1 | 0 | 9 | 0 | +9 | 7 | Qualifying group stage |
| 2 | Moldova | 3 | 2 | 1 | 0 | 6 | 0 | +6 | 7 | Qualifying group stage |
| 3 | Lithuania (H) | 3 | 1 | 0 | 2 | 2 | 4 | −2 | 3 | |
| 4 | Andorra | 3 | 0 | 0 | 3 | 0 | 13 | −13 | 0 | |

Source: UEFA
Rules for classification: Qualification tiebreakers
(H) Hosts

==== 2016–17 matches ====
| Date | Competition | Opponent | Venue | Result | Scorers |
|---|---|---|---|---|---|
| 15 September 2016 | 2017 Women's Euro qual. | Wales | Rodney Parade, Newport | 0–3 | |
| 19 September 2016 | 2017 Women's Euro qual. | Norway | Høddvoll Stadion, Ulsteinvik | 0–5 | |
| 6 April 2017 | 2019 Women's World Cup qual. | Lithuania | LFF Stadium, Vilnius | 2–0 | Awad, Falkon |
| 8 April 2017 | 2019 Women's World Cup qual. | Andorra | LFF Stadium, Vilnius | 7–0 | Shahaf (2), Sofer (2), Tizón (o.g.), Rogers, Sendel |
| 11 April 2017 | 2019 Women's World Cup qual. | Moldova | LFF Stadium, Vilnius | 0–0 | |

=== U-21 National team ===
==== 2017 European U-21 qualifying round (Group 4) ====
| Pos | Team | Pld | W | D | L | GF | GA | GD | Pts | Qualification |
|---|---|---|---|---|---|---|---|---|---|---|
| 1 | Portugal | 10 | 8 | 2 | 0 | 34 | 5 | +29 | 26 | Final tournament |
| 2 | Israel | 10 | 6 | 3 | 1 | 21 | 4 | +17 | 21 | |
| 3 | Greece | 10 | 4 | 1 | 5 | 13 | 14 | −1 | 13 | |
| 4 | Albania | 10 | 3 | 3 | 4 | 11 | 20 | −9 | 12 | |
| 5 | Hungary | 10 | 3 | 3 | 4 | 19 | 16 | +3 | 12 | |
| 6 | Liechtenstein | 10 | 0 | 0 | 10 | 1 | 40 | −39 | 0 | |

Source: UEFA
Rules for classification: Qualification tiebreakers

==== 2016–17 matches ====
| Date | Competition | Opponent | Venue | Result | Scorers |
|---|---|---|---|---|---|
| 2 September 2016 | 2017 U-21 Euro qual. | Portugal | Estádio da Mata Real, Paços de Ferreira | 0–0 | |
| 6 September 2016 | 2017 U-21 Euro qual. | Liechtenstein | HaMoshava Stadium, Petah Tikva | 4–0 | E. Peretz, M. Ohana (2), Barshazki |
| 6 October 2016 | 2017 U-21 Euro qual. | Greece | Turner Stadium, Be'er Sheva | 4–0 | Altman (2), Gozlan, D. Peretz |
| 10 October 2016 | 2017 U-21 Euro qual. | Albania | Hamoshava Stadium, Petah Tikva | 4–0 | Gozlan, Altman, Biton, Hugi |
| 23 March 2017 | Friendly | Cyprus | AEK Arena, Larnaca | 0–1 | |
| 5 June 2017 | Friendly | Serbia | Municipal Stadium, Lod | 0–0 | |

=== U-19 National team ===
==== 2017 UEFA European Under-19 Championship qualification ====
===== Qualifying round =====
| Pos | Team | Pld | W | D | L | GF | GA | GD | Pts | Qualification |
|---|---|---|---|---|---|---|---|---|---|---|
| 1 | Israel | 3 | 3 | 0 | 0 | 9 | 2 | +7 | 9 | Elite round |
| 2 | Scotland | 3 | 2 | 0 | 1 | 2 | 1 | +1 | 6 | Elite round |
| 3 | Andorra (H) | 3 | 1 | 0 | 2 | 6 | 6 | 0 | 3 | |
| 4 | Liechtenstein | 3 | 0 | 0 | 3 | 2 | 10 | −8 | 0 | |

Source: UEFA
Rules for classification: Qualification tiebreakers
(H) Hosts

===== Elite round =====
| Pos | Team | Pld | W | D | L | GF | GA | GD | Pts | Qualification |
|---|---|---|---|---|---|---|---|---|---|---|
| 1 | Bulgaria | 3 | 2 | 1 | 0 | 6 | 3 | +3 | 7 | Final tournament |
| 2 | Bosnia and Herzegovina | 3 | 1 | 1 | 1 | 4 | 4 | 0 | 4 | |
| 3 | Israel | 3 | 0 | 3 | 0 | 2 | 2 | 0 | 3 | |
| 4 | France (H) | 3 | 0 | 1 | 2 | 1 | 4 | −3 | 1 | |

Source: UEFA
Rules for classification: Qualification tiebreakers
(H) Hosts

==== 2016–17 matches ====
| Date | Competition | Opponent | Venue | Result | Scorers |
|---|---|---|---|---|---|
| 9 August 2016 | Friendly | Romania | Centrul National De Fotbal, Buftea | 4–0 | Mahamid (2), Y. Levi, Abu Fani |
| 11 August 2016 | Friendly | Romania | Centrul National De Fotbal, Buftea | 2–1 | Mahamid (2) |
| 1 September 2016 | Tournament Cele | Ukraine | Stadion na Somborskoj kapiji, Subotica | 1–2 | Almog |
| 2 September 2016 | Tournament Cele | Hungary | Gradski Stadion, Bačka Topola | 3–0 | Aharon, Almog (2) |
| 5 September 2016 | Tournament Cele | Serbia | Stadion na Somborskoj kapiji, Subotica | 1–3 | Abu Fani |
| 25 October 2016 | 2017 U-19 Euro qual. round | Andorra | Estadi Comunal, Andorra la Vella | 3–2 | Khalaila, Asefa, Mahamid |
| 27 October 2016 | 2017 U-19 Euro qual. round | Liechtenstein | Centre d'Entrenament FAF, Andorra la Vella | 5–0 | Mahamid (2), Altman, Khalaila, Najjar |
| 30 October 2016 | 2017 U-19 Euro qual. round | Scotland | Centre d'Entrenament FAF, Andorra la Vella | 1–0 | Abu Fani |
| 14 February 2017 | Friendly | Cyprus | Ketzef Stadium, Haifa | 3–0 | Abu Ktifan, Almog, Anas Mahamid |
| 16 February 2017 | Friendly | Cyprus | Ketzef Stadium, Haifa | 2–0 | Baribo, Anas Mahamid |
| 28 February 2017 | Friendly | Ukraine | National Team Complex, Shefayim | 3–1 | Anas Mahamid (2), Y. Levi |
| 2 March 2017 | Friendly | Ukraine | National Team Complex, Shefayim | 1–0 | Abu Fani |
| 22 March 2017 | 2017 U-19 Euro elite round | Bulgaria | Stade municipal des Allées Jean Leroi, Blois | 1–1 | Abu Fani |
| 24 March 2017 | 2017 U-19 Euro elite round | Bosnia and Herzegovina | Stade Jules Ladoumègue, Romorantin-Lanthenay | 1–1 | Abu Fani |
| 27 March 2017 | 2017 U-19 Euro elite round | France | Stade municipal des Allées Jean Leroi, Blois | 0–0 | |

=== U-19 Women's National team ===
==== 2017 UEFA Women's Under-19 Championship qualification ====
===== Qualifying round =====
| Pos | Team | Pld | W | D | L | GF | GA | GD | Pts | Qualification |
|---|---|---|---|---|---|---|---|---|---|---|
| 1 | Slovenia (H) | 3 | 2 | 1 | 0 | 6 | 2 | +4 | 7 | Elite round |
| 2 | Russia | 3 | 1 | 1 | 1 | 7 | 7 | 0 | 4 | Possible qualification based on ranking |
| 3 | Greece | 3 | 1 | 0 | 2 | 3 | 6 | −3 | 3 | |
| 4 | Israel | 3 | 0 | 2 | 1 | 1 | 2 | −1 | 2 | |

Source: UEFA
Rules for classification: Qualification tiebreakers
(H) Hosts

==== 2016–17 matches ====
| Date | Competition | Opponent | Venue | Result | Scorers |
|---|---|---|---|---|---|
| 8 September 2016 | 2017 U-19 Women's Euro qual. round | Russia | Bakovci Stadium, Bakovci | 1–1 | Cabrera |
| 10 September 2016 | 2017 U-19 Women's Euro qual. round | Slovenia | Lendava Sports Park, Lendava | 0–0 | |
| 13 September 2016 | 2017 U-19 Women's Euro qual. round | Greece | Bakovci Stadium, Bakovci | 0–1 | |

- In addition to these matches, the national team competed in the Women's League, finishing 7th, with 10 victories, 2 draws and 10 losses, scoring 43 goals and conceding 23 goals.

=== U-18 National team ===
==== 2016–17 matches ====
| Date | Competition | Opponent | Venue | Result | Scorers |
|---|---|---|---|---|---|
| 3 September 2016 | Friendly | Italy | Edgeley Park, Stockport | 1–4 | Goldberg |
| 5 September 2016 | Friendly | England | Globe Arena, Morecambe | 1–5 | Nadir |
| 8 December 2016 | Friendly | South Korea | National Team Complex, Shefayim | 3–0 | Zamir, Almog, Ohana |
| 13 December 2016 | Winter Tournament | Germany | Ramat Gan Stadium, Ramat Gan | 0–4 | |
| 15 December 2016 | Winter Tournament | South Korea | Ramat Gan Stadium, Ramat Gan | 2–2 (4–3 p) | Shlomo, Karzev |
| 21 March 2017 | Friendly | Romania | National Team Complex, Shefayim | 2–5 | Shua (2) |
| 23 March 2017 | Friendly | Romania | National Team Complex, Shefayim | 3–2 | Hadad (3) |

=== U-17 National team ===
==== 2017 UEFA European Under-17 Championship qualification ====
===== Qualifying round =====
| Pos | Team | Pld | W | D | L | GF | GA | GD | Pts | Qualification |
|---|---|---|---|---|---|---|---|---|---|---|
| 1 | Israel (H) | 3 | 3 | 0 | 0 | 7 | 1 | +6 | 9 | Elite round |
| 2 | Poland | 3 | 1 | 1 | 1 | 4 | 4 | 0 | 4 | Elite round |
| 3 | Armenia | 3 | 1 | 1 | 1 | 4 | 5 | −1 | 4 | Elite round |
| 4 | Iceland | 3 | 0 | 0 | 3 | 2 | 7 | −5 | 0 | |

Source: UEFA
Rules for classification: Qualification tiebreakers
(H) Hosts

===== Elite round =====
| Pos | Team | Pld | W | D | L | GF | GA | GD | Pts | Qualification |
|---|---|---|---|---|---|---|---|---|---|---|
| 1 | Hungary (H) | 3 | 2 | 0 | 1 | 3 | 2 | +1 | 6 | Final tournament |
| 2 | Norway | 3 | 1 | 1 | 1 | 5 | 3 | +2 | 4 | Final tournament |
| 3 | Israel | 3 | 1 | 1 | 1 | 1 | 3 | −2 | 4 | |
| 4 | Russia | 3 | 0 | 2 | 1 | 3 | 4 | −1 | 2 | |

Source: UEFA
Rules for classification: Qualification tiebreakers
(H) Hosts

==== 2016–17 matches ====
| Date | Competition | Opponent | Venue | Result | Scorers |
|---|---|---|---|---|---|
| 17 August 2016 | Friendly | Bulgaria | National Team Complex, Shefayim | 1–0 | Berkovic |
| 18 August 2016 | Friendly | Bulgaria | National Team Complex, Shefayim | 3–0 | G. Dahan, Kanaan, Kartsev |
| 9 September 2016 | Four Nations, Germany | Italy | Steigerwaldstadion, Erfurt | 1–1 | Hen |
| 11 September 2016 | Four Nations, Germany | Netherlands | bluechip-Arena, Meuselwitz | 0–2 | |
| 13 November 2016 | Four Nations, Germany | Germany | Ernst-Abbe-Sportfeld, Jena | 1–3 | G. Dahan |
| 1 November 2016 | 2017 U-17 Euro qual. round | Iceland | Herzliya Municipal Stadium, Herzliya | 2–0 | G. Dahan, Brami |
| 3 November 2016 | 2017 U-17 Euro qual. round | Armenia | Herzliya Municipal Stadium, Herzliya | 2–0 | Strosberg, Kanaan |
| 6 November 2016 | 2017 U-17 Euro qual. round | Poland | Herzliya Municipal Stadium, Herzliya | 3–1 | Hen (2), Kanaan |
| 16 January 2017 | Belarus Development Cup | Georgia | Football Manege, Minsk | 4–0 | Karzev (2), G. Dahan, Majdub |
| 17 January 2017 | Belarus Development Cup | Ukraine | Football Manege, Minsk | 2–0 | M. Levi, G. Dahan |
| 19 January 2017 | Belarus Development Cup | Lithuania | Football Manege, Minsk | 0–0 | |
| 21 January 2017 | Belarus Development Cup | Belarus | Football Manege, Minsk | 1–1 (4–2 p) | Karzev |
| 22 January 2017 | Belarus Development Cup | Russia | Football Manege, Minsk | 0–1 | |
| 21 March 2017 | 2017 U-17 Euro elite round | Hungary | Globall Football Park, Telki | 1–0 | Hen |
| 23 March 2017 | 2017 U-17 Euro elite round | Norway | Városi Stadion, Dabas | 0–3 | |
| 26 March 2017 | 2017 U-17 Euro elite round | Russia | Városi Stadion, Dabas | 0–0 | |

=== U-17 Women's National team ===
==== 2017 UEFA Women's Under-17 Championship qualification ====
| Pos | Team | Pld | W | D | L | GF | GA | GD | Pts | Qualification |
|---|---|---|---|---|---|---|---|---|---|---|
| 1 | Denmark | 3 | 3 | 0 | 0 | 12 | 2 | +10 | 9 | Elite round |
| 2 | Switzerland | 3 | 2 | 0 | 1 | 5 | 4 | +1 | 6 | Elite round |
| 3 | Slovakia | 3 | 1 | 0 | 2 | 2 | 9 | −7 | 3 | |
| 4 | Israel (H) | 3 | 0 | 0 | 3 | 0 | 4 | −4 | 0 | |

Source: UEFA
Rules for classification: Qualification tiebreakers
(H) Hosts

==== 2016–17 results ====
| Date | Competition | Opponent | Venue | Result | Scorers |
|---|---|---|---|---|---|
| 20 September 2016 | 2017 U-17 Women's Euro qual. round | Switzerland | National Team Complex, Shefayim | 0–1 | |
| 22 September 2016 | 2017 U-17 Women's Euro qual. round | Denmark | National Team Complex, Shefayim | 0–2 | |
| 25 September 2016 | 2017 U-17 Women's Euro qual. round | Slovakia | National Team Complex, Shefayim | 0–1 | |

=== U-16 National team ===
==== 2016–17 results ====
| Date | Competition | Opponent | Venue | Result | Scorers |
|---|---|---|---|---|---|
| 16 August 2016 | Valentin Ivanov Tournament | Lithuania | Eduard Streltsov Stadium, Moscow | 2–0 | Joabra, Nathaniel |
| 18 August 2016 | Valentin Ivanov Tournament | Moldova | Eduard Streltsov Stadium, Moscow | 2–1 | Ovadia (2) |
| 20 August 2016 | Valentin Ivanov Tournament | Russia | Eduard Streltsov Stadium, Moscow | 2–2 | Nathaniel, Ovadia |
| 13 February 2017 | Winter Tournament | Czech Republic | National Team Complex, Shefayim | 5–3 | Mordechai (2), Abeda, Hantsis, Ovadia |
| 14 February 2017 | Winter Tournament | Bulgaria | National Team Complex, Shefayim | 6–0 | Ovadia, Joabra, Balinov (o.g.), I. Dahan, Mordechai, Mawasi |
| 16 February 2017 | Winter Tournament | Russia | National Team Complex, Shefayim | 1–1 | Ovadia |
| 19 April 2017 | UEFA Development Tournament, Macedonia | Romania | Training Centre Petar Miloševski, Skopje | 0–1 | |
| 21 April 2017 | UEFA Development Tournament, Macedonia | Liechtenstein | Training Centre Petar Miloševski, Skopje | 4–1 | Ovadia, Lugasi, Joabra, Ram |
| 23 April 2017 | UEFA Development Tournament, Macedonia | North Macedonia | Training Centre Petar Miloševski, Skopje | 1–0 | O. Levi |

=== U-16 Women's National team ===
==== 2016–17 results ====
| Date | Competition | Opponent | Venue | Result | Scorers |
|---|---|---|---|---|---|
| 26 April 2017 | UEFA Development Tournament, Macedonia | Romania | Training Centre Petar Miloševski, Skopje | 1–0 | Michaeli |
| 28 April 2017 | UEFA Development Tournament, Macedonia | Liechtenstein | Training Centre Petar Miloševski, Skopje | 3–0 | Porat, Rotenberg, al-Rahmi |
| 30 April 2017 | UEFA Development Tournament, Macedonia | North Macedonia | Training Centre Petar Miloševski, Skopje | 3–0 | E. Levi (3) |
