= 2017–18 in Israeli football =

Football in Israel
- Season: 2017–18

Men's football
- Premier League Women's Premier: Hapoel Be'er Sheva; F.C. Kiryat Gat
- Liga Leumit Women's Leumit: Maccabi Netanya; Hapoel Ra'anana
- State Cup Women's Cup: Bnei Yehuda; ASA Tel Aviv University
- Toto Cup Al: Hapoel Be'er Sheva
- Super Cup: Hapoel Be'er Sheva

The 2017–18 season is the 70th season of competitive football in Israel, and the 92nd season under the Israeli Football Association, established in 1928, during the British Mandate.

== Promotion and relegation ==
=== Pre–season ===
League	Promoted to League	Relegated from League
Premier League	Maccabi Netanya; Hapoel Acre	Hapoel Kfar Saba; Hapoel Tel Aviv
Liga Leumit	Hapoel Hadera; Hapoel Marmorek	Hapoel Jerusalem; Maccabi Sha'arayim
Liga Alef	Hapoel Shefa-'Amr; Hapoel Umm al-Fahm; Hapoel Tzafririm Holon Yaniv; Nordia Jerusalem	Tzeirei Kafr Kanna; Hapoel F.C. Karmiel Safed; Bnei Jaffa Ortodoxim; F.C. Shikun HaMizrah
Liga Bet	Bnei HaGolan VeHaGalil; Maccabi Nujeidat; Maccabi Bnei Reineh; Hapoel Bnei Fureidis; Shimshon Kafr Qasim; Ironi Beit Dagan; AS Ashdod; Hapoel Yeruham; Tzeirei Tamra (Note: Tzeirei Tamra was promoted as the best placed runner-up in the northern divisions to replace F.C. Karmiel/Safed, which folded during the season.); Maccabi Ironi Tamra (Note: Maccabi Ironi Tamra was promoted as the second best placed runner-up to fill a vacancy after Hapoel Daliyat al Karmel F.C. and Maccabi Daliyat al Karmel F.C. merged.)	Beitar Haifa; Maccabi Sektzia Ma'alot-Tarshiha; Maccabi Ironi Yafa; Beitar Kafr Kanna; Beitar Ramat Gan; Maccabi Ironi Kfar Yona; Beitar Yavne; Maccabi Segev Shalom
Ligat Nashim (women)	Bnot Sakhnin	Hapoel Ra'anana

== IFA competitions ==
=== League competitions ===
==== 2017–18 Israeli Premier League ====
Pos	Team	Pld	W	D	L	GF	GA	GD	Pts	Qualification
1	Hapoel Be'er Sheva (C)	36	24	8	4	70	27	+43	80	Qualification for the Champions League first qualifying round
2	Maccabi Tel Aviv	36	21	8	7	60	33	+27	71	Qualification for the Europa League first qualifying round
3	Beitar Jerusalem	36	20	8	8	75	51	+24	68	Qualification for the Europa League first qualifying round
4	Hapoel Haifa	36	17	11	8	48	39	+9	62	Qualification for the Europa League second qualifying round (Note: Hapoel Haifa qualified for the Europa League second qualifying round by winning the 2017–18 Israel State Cup.)
5	Maccabi Netanya	36	16	10	10	59	54	+5	58	
6	Bnei Yehuda Tel Aviv	36	13	10	13	47	41	+6	49	

Source: Israel Football Association, Soccerway
Rules for classification: 1) Points; 2) Goal difference; 3) Matches won; 4) Goals scored; 5) Head-to-head points; 6) Head-to-head goal difference; 7) Head-to-head goals scored; 8) Play-off.
(C) Champions
Notes:

Pos	Team	Pld	W	D	L	GF	GA	GD	Pts	Relegation
7	Ironi Kiryat Shmona	33	13	6	14	39	36	+3	45	
8	Maccabi Petah Tikva	33	12	7	14	40	44	−4	43	
9	Hapoel Ra'anana	33	11	7	15	36	45	−9	40	
10	Maccabi Haifa	33	10	8	15	38	39	−1	38	
11	Bnei Sakhnin	33	10	8	15	32	47	−15	38	
12	F.C. Ashdod	33	6	10	17	29	48	−19	28	
13	Hapoel Ashkelon (R)	33	4	9	20	23	51	−28	21	Relegation to Liga Leumit
14	Hapoel Akko (Note: Hapoel Acre were deducted 2 points; 2 were deducted points due to violations of contract rules (reduced from the original 3 point deduction) and another 2 points due fielding 6 foreigners in a match against Maccabi Petah Tikva on fixture 10(was returned on the 20th of December).) (R)	33	6	4	23	26	67	−41	20	Relegation to Liga Leumit

Source: Israel Football Association, Soccerway
Rules for classification: 1) Points; 2) Goal difference; 3) Matches won; 4) Goals scored; 5) Head-to-head points; 6) Head-to-head goal difference; 7) Head-to-head goals scored; 8) Play-off.
(R) Relegated

==== 2017–18 Ligat Nashim ====
Pos	Team	Pld	W	D	L	GF	GA	GD	Pts	Qualification or relegation (Note: Teams play each other two times (18 rounds) before the league is split into two groups (the top five and the bottom four).)
1	F.C. Kiryat Gat	24	21	1	2	95	21	+74	64	Qualification for the Champions League
2	F.C. Ramat HaSharon	24	21	0	3	82	12	+70	63	
3	Maccabi Kishronot Hadera	24	15	3	6	45	27	+18	48	
4	ASA Tel Aviv University	24	9	1	14	41	57	−16	28	
5	Maccabi Holon	24	6	3	15	35	72	−37	21	
6	Hapoel Ra'anana	22	9	4	9	42	31	+11	31	
7	Youth Academy	22	9	3	10	38	42	−4	30	
8	Bnot Netanya	22	3	3	16	16	60	−44	12	Relegation play-offs
9	Hapoel Petah Tikva	22	1	2	19	9	81	−72	5	Relegation to Liga Leumit

Updated to match(es) played on 29 May 2018. Source: Israel Football Association
Rules for classification: 1) Points; 2) Matches won; 3) Head-to head 4) deciding match.

=== Cup competitions ===
==== 2017–18 Israel State Cup ====
9 May 2018

Hapoel Haifa	3–1 (a.e.t.)	Beitar Jerusalem
Plakuschenko 28'; Scheimann 105'; Turgeman 120'	Report	Varenne 29'

Teddy Stadium, Jerusalem
Referee: Liran Liany

==== 2017–18 Israeli Women's Cup ====
23 May 2018
19:45

F.C. Ramat HaSharon	3–2 (a.e.t.)	F.C. Kiryat Gat
Tabatha 7', 100'; Shahaf 30'	Report	46' Efraim; 74' Schulmann

HaMoshava Stadium, Petah Tikva
Referee: Meitar Shemesh

==== 2017–18 Toto Cup Al ====
14 December 2017
21:00

Hapoel Be'er Sheva	0–1	Maccabi Tel Aviv
	Report	Kjartansson 83'

HaMoshava Stadium, Petah Tikva
Referee: Menashe Mashiah

==== 2017 Israel Super Cup ====
10 August 2017

Hapoel Be'er Sheva	4–2	Bnei Yehuda
Ghadir 20'; Pekhart 57'; Taha 74'; Nwakaeme 79'	Report	Buzaglo 53' (pen.); Kandil 67'

Netanya Stadium, Netanya
Attendance: 6,350
Referee: Roi Reinshreiber

== International Club Competitions ==
=== UEFA Champions League ===
==== Second qualifying round ====
Team 1	Agg.	Team 2	1st leg	2nd leg
Hapoel Be'er Sheva (Israel)	5–3	(Hungary) Honvéd	2–1	3–2

==== Third qualifying round ====
Team 1	Agg.	Team 2	1st leg	2nd leg
Hapoel Be'er Sheva (Israel)	3–3 (a)	(Bulgaria) Ludogorets Razgrad	2–0	1–3

==== Play-off round ====
Team 1	Agg.	Team 2	1st leg	2nd leg
Hapoel Be'er Sheva (Israel)	2–2 (a)	(Slovenia) Maribor	2–1	0–1

=== UEFA Europa League ===
==== First qualifying round ====
Team 1	Agg.	Team 2	1st leg	2nd leg
Maccabi Tel Aviv (Israel)	5–0	(Albania) Tirana	2–0	3–0
Beitar Jerusalem (Israel)	7–3	(Hungary) Vasas	4–3	3–0

==== Second qualifying round ====
Team 1	Agg.	Team 2	1st leg	2nd leg
Beitar Jerusalem (Israel)	1–5	(Bulgaria) Botev Plovdiv	1–1	0–4
Maccabi Tel Aviv (Israel)	5–1	(Iceland) KR	3–1	2–0
Trenčín (Slovakia)	1–3	(Israel) Bnei Yehuda	1–1	0–2

==== Third qualifying round ====
Team 1	Agg.	Team 2	1st leg	2nd leg
Maccabi Tel Aviv (Israel)	2–0	(Greece) Panionios	1–0	1–0
Bnei Yehuda (Israel)	1–2	(Russia) Zenit Saint Petersburg	0–2	1–0

==== Play-off round ====
Team 1	Agg.	Team 2	1st leg	2nd leg
Rheindorf Altach (Austria)	2–3	(Israel) Maccabi Tel Aviv	0–1	2–2

==== Group stage ====
===== Group A =====
Pos	Team	Pld	W	D	L	GF	GA	GD	Pts	Qualification	VIL	AST	SLP	MTA
1	(Spain) Villarreal	6	3	2	1	10	6	+4	11	Advance to knockout phase	—	3–1	2–2	0–1
2	(Kazakhstan) Astana	6	3	1	2	10	7	+3	10	Advance to knockout phase	2–3	—	1–1	4–0
3	(Czech Republic) Slavia Prague	6	2	2	2	6	6	0	8		0–2	0–1	—	1–0
4	(Israel) Maccabi Tel Aviv	6	1	1	4	1	8	−7	4		0–0	0–1	0–2	—

Source: UEFA

===== Group G =====
Pos	Team	Pld	W	D	L	GF	GA	GD	Pts	Qualification	PLZ	FCSB	LUG	HBS
1	(Czech Republic) Viktoria Plzeň	6	4	0	2	13	8	+5	12	Advance to knockout phase	—	2–0	4–1	3–1
2	(Romania) FCSB	6	3	1	2	9	7	+2	10	Advance to knockout phase	3–0	—	1–2	1–1
3	(Switzerland) Lugano	6	3	0	3	9	11	−2	9		3–2	1–2	—	1–0
4	(Israel) Hapoel Be'er Sheva	6	1	1	4	5	10	−5	4		0–2	1–2	2–1	—

Source: UEFA

=== UEFA Women's Champions League ===
==== Group 9 ====
Pos	Team	Pld	W	D	L	GF	GA	GD	Pts	Qualification	AVA	SUB	PLJ	KIR
1	(Norway) Avaldsnes	3	3	0	0	10	3	+7	9	Round of 32	—	2–0	2–1	—
2	(Serbia) Spartak Subotica	3	2	0	1	13	3	+10	6		—	—	6–0	7–1
3	(Montenegro) Breznica Pljevlja (H)	3	0	1	2	3	10	−7	1		—	—	—	2–2
4	(Israel) Kiryat Gat	3	0	1	2	5	15	−10	1		2–6	—	—	—

Source: UEFA
(H) Hosts

=== UEFA Youth League ===
==== First round (Champions Path) ====
Team 1	Agg.	Team 2	1st leg	2nd leg
Brodarac (Serbia)	2–1	(Israel) Maccabi Haifa	1–1	1–0

== National Teams ==
=== National team ===
==== 2018 FIFA World Cup qualifying ====
Pos	Team	Pld	W	D	L	GF	GA	GD	Pts	Qualification
1	Spain	10	9	1	0	36	3	+33	28	Qualification to 2018 FIFA World Cup
2	Italy	10	7	2	1	21	8	+13	23	Advance to second round
3	Albania	10	4	1	5	10	13	−3	13	
4	Israel	10	4	0	6	10	15	−5	12	
5	Macedonia	10	3	2	5	15	15	0	11	
6	Liechtenstein	10	0	0	10	1	39	−38	0	

Source: FIFA
Rules for classification: Qualification tiebreakers

==== 2017–18 matches ====
Date	Competition	Opponent	Venue	Result	Scorers
2 September 2017	2018 World Cup Qual.	North Macedonia	Sammy Ofer Stadium, Haifa	0–1	
5 September 2017	2018 World Cup Qual.	Italy	Mapei Stadium, Reggio Emilia	0–1	
6 October 2017	2018 World Cup Qual.	Liechtenstein	Rheinpark Stadion, Vaduz	1–0	Tibi
9 October 2017	2018 World Cup Qual.	Spain	Teddy Stadium, Jerusalem	0–1	
24 March 2018	Friendly	Romania	Netanya Stadium, Netanya	1–2	Hemed
7 September 2018	2018–19 UEFA Nat. League	Albania	Elbasan Arena, Elbasan	0–1	
11 September 2018	Friendly	Northern Ireland	Windsor Park, Belfast	0–3	
11 October 2018	2018–19 UEFA Nat. League	Scotland	Sammy Ofer Stadium, Haifa	2–1	
14 October 2018	2018–19 UEFA Nat. League	Albania	Turner Stadium, Be'er Sheva	2–0	
20 November 2018	2018–19 UEFA Nat. League	Scotland	Hampden Park, Glasgow	2–3	

=== Women's National Team ===
==== 2019 Women's World Cup qualification ====
Pos	Team	Pld	W	D	L	GF	GA	GD	Pts	Qualification
1	Spain	8	8	0	0	25	2	+23	24	2019 FIFA Women's World Cup
2	Austria	8	5	1	2	19	7	+12	16	
3	Finland	8	3	1	4	9	13	−4	10	
4	Serbia	8	2	1	5	5	13	−8	7	
5	Israel	8	0	1	7	0	23	−23	1	

Source: UEFA
Rules for classification: Qualification tiebreakers

==== 2017–18 matches ====
Date	Competition	Opponent	Venue	Result	Scorers
19 October 2017	2019 Women's World Cup qual.	Serbia	Čukarički Stadium, Belgrade	0–2	
23 October 2017	2019 Women's World Cup qual.	Spain	Ramat Gan Stadium, Ramat Gan	0–6	
23 November 2017	2019 Women's World Cup qual.	Austria	Bundesstadion Südstadt, Maria Enzersdorf	0–2	
26 November 2017	2019 Women's World Cup qual.	Finland	Telia 5G -areena, Helsinki	0–4	
22 January 2018	2019 Women's World Cup qual.	Finland	Ramat Gan Stadium, Ramat Gan	0–0	
10 April 2018	2019 Women's World Cup qual.	Serbia	Ramat Gan Stadium, Ramat Gan	0–1	
7 June 2018	2019 Women's World Cup qual.	Spain	La Condomina, Murcia	0–2	
12 June 2018	2019 Women's World Cup qual.	Austria	Ramat Gan Stadium, Ramat Gan	0–6	

=== U-21 National team ===
==== 2019 European U-21 qualifying round (Group 5) ====
Pos	Team	Pld	W	D	L	GF	GA	GD	Pts	Qualification
1	Germany	10	8	1	1	33	7	+26	25	Final tournament
2	Norway	10	4	3	3	15	13	+2	15	
3	Republic of Ireland	10	4	2	4	12	15	−3	14 (Note: Head-to-head results: Republic of Ireland 4–0 Israel, Israel 3–1 Republic of Ireland.)	
4	Israel	10	4	2	4	17	18	−1	14	
5	Kosovo	10	3	3	4	9	12	−3	12	
6	Azerbaijan	10	0	3	7	6	27	−21	3	

Source: UEFA
Rules for classification: Qualification tiebreakers

==== 2017–18 matches ====
Date	Competition	Opponent	Venue	Result	Scorers
31 August 2017	2019 U-21 Euro qual.	Azerbaijan	Acre Municipal Stadium, Acre	3–1	Barshazki, Peretz, Plakuschenko
5 September 2017	2019 U-21 Euro qual.	Norway	Marienlyst Stadion, Drammen	0–0	
9 October 2017	2019 U-21 Euro qual.	Republic of Ireland	Tallaght Stadium, Dublin	0–4	
9 November 2017	2019 U-21 Euro qual.	Kosovo	Olympic Stadium Adem Jashari, Mitrovica	4–0	Nachmias, Weissman, Dasa, Cohen
14 November 2017	2019 U-21 Euro qual.	Germany	Ramat Gan Stadium, Ramat Gan	2–5	Barshazki, Weissman
22 March 2018	2019 U-21 Euro qual.	Germany	Eintracht-Stadion, Braunschweig	0–3	
27 March 2018	2019 U-21 Euro qual.	Norway	Ramat Gan Stadium, Ramat Gan	1–3	Own goal

=== U-19 National team ===
==== 2018 UEFA European Under-19 Championship qualification ====
===== Qualifying round =====
Pos	Team	Pld	W	D	L	GF	GA	GD	Pts	Qualification
1	Austria (H)	3	3	0	0	5	0	+5	9	Elite round
2	Kosovo	3	2	0	1	5	2	+3	6	Elite round
3	Israel	3	1	0	2	2	4	−2	3	
4	Lithuania	3	0	0	3	0	6	−6	0	

Source: UEFA
Rules for classification: Qualification tiebreakers
(H) Hosts

==== 2017–18 matches ====
Date	Competition	Opponent	Venue	Result	Scorers
3 October 2017	2018 U-19 Euro qual. round	Lithuania	Sportplatz Bürgerau, Saalfelden	1–0	Shua
6 October 2017	2018 U-19 Euro qual. round	Kosovo	Waldstadion Mittersill, Mittersill	1–2	Almog
9 October 2017	2018 U-19 Euro qual. round	Austria	Steinbergstadion, Leogang	0–2	

=== U-19 Women's National team ===
==== 2018 UEFA Women's Under-19 Championship qualification ====
===== Qualifying round =====
Pos	Team	Pld	W	D	L	GF	GA	GD	Pts	Qualification
1	Serbia	3	2	1	0	7	1	+6	7	Elite round
2	Finland (H)	3	1	2	0	12	2	+10	5	Elite round
3	Israel	3	0	2	1	3	6	−3	2	
4	Bosnia and Herzegovina	3	0	1	2	2	15	−13	1	

Source: UEFA
Rules for classification: Qualification tiebreakers
(H) Hosts

==== 2017–18 matches ====
Date	Competition	Opponent	Venue	Result	Scorers
12 September 2017	2018 U-19 Women's Euro qual. round	Finland	Eerikkilä Areena, Tammela	1–1	Winstok
15 September 2017	2018 U-19 Women's Euro qual. round	Serbia	Eerikkilä Areena, Tammela	0–3	
12 September 2017	2018 U-19 Women's Euro qual. round	Bosnia and Herzegovina	Kaurialan kenttä, Hämeenlinna	2–2	Haj, Elinav

=== U-17 National team ===
==== 2018 UEFA European Under-17 Championship qualification ====
===== Qualifying round =====
Pos	Team	Pld	W	D	L	GF	GA	GD	Pts	Qualification
1	Israel	3	3	0	0	6	0	+6	9	Elite round
2	Czech Republic (H)	3	1	1	1	8	3	+5	4	Elite round
3	Turkey	3	1	1	1	5	2	+3	4	Elite round if among four best third-placed teams
4	Armenia	3	0	0	3	0	14	−14	0	

Source: UEFA
Rules for classification: Qualification tiebreakers
(H) Hosts

===== Elite round =====
Pos	Team	Pld	W	D	L	GF	GA	GD	Pts	Qualification
1	Slovenia	3	2	1	0	6	2	+4	7	Final tournament
2	Israel	3	2	0	1	6	4	+2	6	Final tournament
3	Hungary (H)	3	1	1	1	3	2	+1	4	
4	Romania	3	0	0	3	2	9	−7	0	

Source: UEFA
Rules for classification: Qualification tiebreakers
(H) Hosts

==== 2018 UEFA European Under-17 Championship ====
===== Group stage =====
Pos	Team	Pld	W	D	L	GF	GA	GD	Pts	Qualification
1	Italy	3	2	0	1	5	2	+3	6 (Note: Head-to-head results: Italy 2–0 Switzerland, England 2–1 Italy, Switzerland 1–0 England. Head-to-head standings: Italy: 3 pts, +1 GD; England: 3 pts, 0 GD; Switzerland: 3 pts, −1 GD)	Knockout stage
2	England (H)	3	2	0	1	4	3	+1	6	Knockout stage
3	Switzerland	3	2	0	1	4	2	+2	6	
4	Israel	3	0	0	3	1	7	−6	0	

Source: UEFA
Rules for classification: Group stage tiebreakers
(H) Hosts

==== 2017–18 matches ====
Date	Competition	Opponent	Venue	Result	Scorers
13 October 2017	2018 U-17 Euro qual. round	Turkey	Svitavský stadion, Svitavy	1–0	Ovadia
16 October 2017	2018 U-17 Euro qual. round	Czech Republic	Stadion FK Letohrad, Letohrad	2–0	Abada, Ovadia
19 October 2017	2018 U-17 Euro qual. round	Armenia	Stadion FK Letohrad, Letohrad	3–0	Ram, Biton, Abada
22 March 2018	2018 U-17 Euro elite round	Romania	Pancho Aréna, Felcsút	5–1	Jauabra (3), Ovadia, Davida
25 March 2018	2018 U-17 Euro elite round	Slovenia	Üllői Városi Sporttelep, Üllő	0–3	
28 March 2018	2018 U-17 Euro elite round	Hungary	Hidegkuti Nándor Stadion, Budapest	1–0	Own goal
4 May 2018	2018 U-17 Euro	England	Proact Stadium, Chesterfield	1–2	Lugassy
7 May 2018	2018 U-17 Euro	Switzerland	St George's Park, Burton	0–3	
10 May 2018	2018 U-17 Euro	Italy	St George's Park, Burton	0–2	

=== U-17 Women's National team ===
==== 2018 UEFA Women's Under-17 Championship qualification ====
===== Qualifying round =====
Pos	Team	Pld	W	D	L	GF	GA	GD	Pts	Qualification
1	Sweden (H)	3	3	0	0	19	0	+19	9	Elite round
2	Russia	3	2	0	1	3	7	−4	6	Elite round
3	Israel	3	1	0	2	2	3	−1	3	Elite round
4	Croatia	3	0	0	3	1	15	−14	0	

Source: UEFA
Rules for classification: Qualification tiebreakers
(H) Hosts

===== Elite round =====
Pos	Team	Pld	W	D	L	GF	GA	GD	Pts	Qualification
1	Spain	3	3	0	0	12	0	+12	9	Final tournament
2	Denmark	3	2	0	1	4	2	+2	6	
3	Russia	3	0	1	2	2	8	−6	1	
4	Israel (H)	3	0	1	2	1	9	−8	1	

Source: UEFA
Rules for classification: Qualification tiebreakers
(H) Hosts

==== 2017–18 results ====
Date	Competition	Opponent	Venue	Result	Scorers
19 October 2017	2018 U-17 Women's Euro qual. round	Sweden	Rimnersvallen, Uddevalla	0–1	
22 October 2017	2018 U-17 Women's Euro qual. round	Russia	Rimnersvallen, Uddevalla	0–1	
19 October 2017	2018 U-17 Women's Euro qual. round	Croatia	Uddevalla Arena, Ljungskile	2–1	Al Ramhe, Nelson-Levy
8 March 2018	2018 U-17 Women's Euro elite round	Spain	Shefayim National Team Complex, Shefayim	0–7	
11 March 2018	2018 U-17 Women's Euro elite round	Denmark	Shefayim National Team Complex, Shefayim	0–1	
14 March 2018	2018 U-17 Women's Euro elite round	Russia	Shefayim National Team Complex, Shefayim	1–1	Kuznezov
