= 2010–11 Israeli Women's Cup =

Tournament details
- Country: Israel
- Teams: 12

Final positions
- Champions: ASA Tel Aviv University
- Runners-up: Maccabi Holon

Tournament statistics
- Matches played: 10
- Goals scored: 84 (8.4 per match)
- Top goal scorer(s): Hila Havia; Shirley Ohana (8)

The 2010–11 Israeli Women's Cup (Hebrew: גביע המדינה נשים, Gvia HaMedina Nashim) was the 13th season of Israel's women's nationwide football cup competition.

The competition was won by ASA Tel Aviv University who had beaten Maccabi Holon 3–2 in the final.

Starting with this season, the IFA organized a league cup competition for the League’s second division. The winner of this cup was Hapoel Be’er Sheva, who had beaten Maccabi Kishronot Hadera B 7–1 in the final.

== Results ==
=== First round ===
7 December 2010	ASA Tel Aviv University	3–0	Bnot Sakhnin	Tel Aviv
19:15	Falkon 61', 86'; Jan 90'	Report		Stadium: Tel Aviv University Stadium; Referee: Rachel Cohen

7 December 2010	Hapoel Acre	0–19	Hapoel Petah Tikva	Nazareth Illit
19:30		Report	Liron Tayar 5' (pen.), 16'; Havia 9', 24', 26', 32', 34', 37'; Sages 11'; Na’im 13', 41', 50', 79'; Meshcheryakov 31', 55'; Tubul 35' (o.g.); Lian Tayar 58', 60'; Pakciarz 81'	Stadium: Green Stadium; Referee: Lilach Asulin

7 December 2010	Hapoel Rishon LeZion	0–7	Maccabi Kishronot Hadera	Rishon LeZion
20:00		Report	S. Twil 13'; Van Ouwerkerk 21', 24', 33', 34', 47'; Barqui 70'	Stadium: Superland West; Referee: Zvia Malka

9 December 2010	Hapoel Be’er Sheva	0–5	Maccabi Holon	Be’er Sheva
20:00		Report	Ohana 32'; Moyal 58'; R. Shimrich 66'; Antman 74' (pen.); Machlev 80'	Stadium: Reisser Stadium; Referee: Shimon Elkabetz

=== Quarter-finals ===
21 December 2010	Maccabi Holon	24–0	F.C. Kiryat Gat	Holon
18:30	Ohana 2', 18', 22', 31', 57', 60'; Dayan 3', 10', 20', 34'; Shmuel 7'; R. Shimrich 14', 17'; Machlev 16'; Sabag 25'; Alal 26'; Ravitz 27'; Sendel 49', 65'; N. Cohen 55'; Tzukrel 56'; Erez 66', 70'; Moyal 71'	Report		Stadium: Holon New Stadium; Referee: Zvia Malka

21 December 2010	Maccabi Tzur Shalom Bialik	2–2 (a.e.t.) (2–4 p)	Hapoel Petah Tivka	Kiryat Bialik
18:30	Nachushi 87'; Ronen 106'	Report	Havia 58'; Sages 115'	Stadium: Tzur Shalom Stadium; Referee: Lilach Asulin

21 December 2010	Maccabi Be'er Sheva	w/o (Note: F.C. Ramat HaSharon failed to show up to the match.)	F.C. Ramat HaSharon

8 January 2011	ASA Tel Aviv University	6–0	Maccabi Kishronot Hadera	Tel Aviv
18:30	Y. Cohen 5', 45'; Jan 29', 36', 63'; Sade 58'	Report		Stadium: Tel Aviv University Stadium; Referee: Rachel Cohen

=== Semi-finals ===
5 April 2011	Hapoel Petah Tivka	1–7	ASA Tel Aviv University	Ness Ziona
17:00	Havia 33'	Report	Y. Cohen 1', 24', 37', 80'; Jan 29', 50', 72'	Stadium: Ness Ziona Stadium; Referee: Idan Bernstein

5 April 2011	Maccabi Holon	3–0	Maccabi Be'er Sheva	Ness Ziona
19:15	Dayan 32'; Ohana 36'; V. Cohen 71'	Report		Stadium: Ness Ziona Stadium; Referee: Meitar Shemesh

=== Final ===
13 April 2011
19:30

Maccabi Holon	2–3	ASA Tel Aviv University
Machlev 21'; Erez 59'	Report	Stein 24'; Fridman 31'; Falkon 85'

Ness Ziona Stadium, Ness Ziona
Referee: Lilach Asulin

== Gvia Ligat Nashim Shniya ==
2010–11 Ligat Nashim Shniya Cup
Tournament details
- Country: Israel
- Teams: 5

Final positions
- Champions: Hapoel Be’er Sheva
- Runners-up: Maccabi Kishronot Hadera B

Tournament statistics
- Matches played: 3
- Goals scored: 23 (7.67 per match)

=== Format ===
The five second division teams were split into two groups, north and south. The two regional winners met in the final. As Hapoel Acre forfeited its matches in the northern group, there was only one match in each regional group, acting as a semi-final.

=== Group stage ===
==== Northern group ====
31 March 2011	Maccabi Kishronot Hadera B	3–1	F.C. Ramat HaSharon	Hadera
20:30	Amram 19'; Punis 45', 47'	Report	Mor Haim 2'	Stadium: Hapoel Hadera Stadium; Referee: Idan Goresh

==== Southern group ====
31 March 2011	Hapoel Be’er Sheva	11–0	F.C. Kiryat Gat	Be’er Sheva
20:00	Arkiva 3', 4', 22'; Rogers 13', 16', 17'; Bercholc 15' (pen.); Alush 25', 59'; Elmakayes 48' (pen.); Rahamim 75'	Report		Stadium: Reisser Stadium; Referee: Snir Levi

=== Final ===
21 April 2011
19:00

Hapoel Be’er Sheva	7–1	Maccabi Kishronot Hadera B
Rahamim 4', 58'; Alush 17', 55'; Rogers 24'; Arkiva 27'; Elmakayes 86'	Report	Punis 70'

Ramat Gan Stadium Training Ground, Ramat Gan
Referee: Meitar Shemesh
