= 2017–18 Israeli Women's Cup =

Tournament details
- Country: Israel

Final positions
- Champions: F.C. Ramat HaSharon
- Runners-up: F.C. Kiryat Gat

Tournament statistics
- Matches played: 12
- Goals scored: 95 (7.92 per match)
- Top goal scorer: Tabatha (12)

The 2017–18 Israeli Women's Cup (Hebrew: גביע המדינה נשים, Gvia HaMedina Nashim) was the 20th season of Israel's women's nationwide football cup competition. The competition began on 19 December 2017 with 6 first round matches.

F.C. Ramat HaSharon won the cup, beating F.C. Kiryat Gat 3–2 in the final.

== Results ==
=== Bracket ===
1st Round
Hapoel Be'er Sheva	16
Beitar Ma'ale Adumim	0
F.C. Ramat HaSharon	4
Bnot Netanya	0
ASA Tel Aviv	3
Kishronot Hadera	1
Hapoel Ra'anana	0
F.C. Kiryat Gat	4
Maccabi Holon	7
Tzur Shalom Bialik	0
Hapoel Bnot Pardesiya	0
Bnot Emek Hefer	2

Quarter-finals
Hapoel Be'er Sheva	6
Hapoel Petah Tikva	3
F.C. Ramat HaSharon	20
Maccabi Be'er Sheva	0^{1}
ASA Tel Aviv	1
F.C. Kiryat Gat	5
Maccabi Holon	w/o
Bnot Emek Hefer	–^{2}

Semi-finals
Hapoel Be'er Sheva	0
F.C. Ramat HaSharon	10
F.C. Kiryat Gat	8
Maccabi Holon	0

Final
F.C. Ramat HaSharon	3
F.C. Kiryat Gat	2

^{1}The match was abandoned at the 59th minute with Hapoel Bnei Fureidis leading 20–0 as Maccabi Be'er Sheva remained with only six players on the field.
^{2}Maccabi Bnot Emek Hefer failed to appear to the match.

=== Final ===
23 May 2018
19:45

F.C. Ramat HaSharon	3–2 (a.e.t.)	F.C. Kiryat Gat
Tabatha 7', 100'; Shahaf 30'	Report	46' Efraim; 74' Schulmann

HaMoshava Stadium, Petah Tikva
Referee: Meitar Shemesh
