= Shay Sade =

Israeli footballer

Shay Sade שי שדה
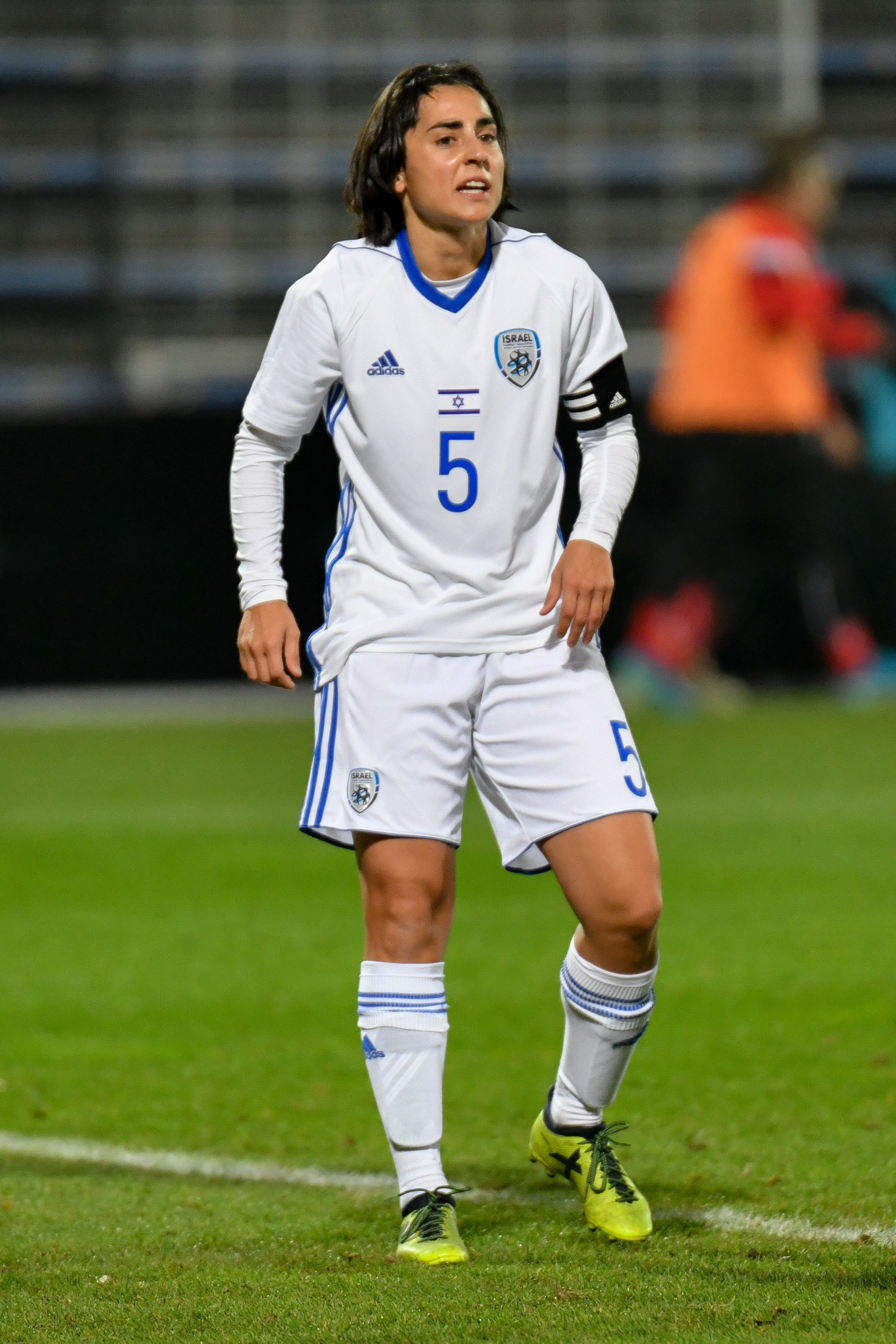

Personal information
- Date of birth: 16 April 1990 (age 36)
- Place of birth: Hod HaSharon, Israel
- Height: 5 ft 4 in (1.63 m)
- Position: Defender

Team information
- Current team: ASA Tel Aviv
- Number: 5

Youth career
- 2003–2004: Hapoel Hod HaSharon

College career
Years	Team	Apps	(Gls)
2012	Youngstown State	14	(2)

Senior career*
Years	Team	Apps	(Gls)
2004–2005	Maccabi Kishronot Hadera		
2005–2009	F.C. Ramat HaSharon		
2009–2014	ASA Tel Aviv University	71	(3)
2014–2018	F.C. Ramat HaSharon	12	(1)
2019–	ASA Tel Aviv		

International career^{‡}
2006–2008	Israel U19	11	(0)
2009–2019	Israel	49	(1)
- * Club domestic league appearances and goals as of 9 November 2015 ‡ National team caps and goals as of 6 December 2021

Shay Sade (Hebrew: שי שדה; born 16 April 1990) is an Israeli football defender.

== Club career ==
Sade started playing football with the boys team of Hapoel Hod HaSharon, before joining Maccabi Kishronot Hadera in the Women's League at the age of 14. After a year in Hadera, Sade joined F.C. Ramat HaSharon when the team was established and played with the team until 2009. Sade played between 2009 and 2014 at ASA Tel Aviv University, winning 5 championship titles and 3 national cups with the club, as well as playing in the UEFA Women's Champions League. In 2014, Sade returned to F.C. Ramat HaSharon.

In 2012, Sade started attending Youngstown State University, playing for the women's soccer team. In 2013, she had transferred to University of Texas at Brownsville.

== International career ==
Sade played it first match for the national team in 2009, against Belarus, and had played in 25 matches. Between 2006 and 2008 played for the U-19 national team, appearing in 11 matches.

== Honours ==
- Championships (5):
  - With ASA Tel Aviv University: 2009–10, 2010–11, 2011–12, 2012–13, 2013–14, 2018–19
- Cup (2):
  - With ASA Tel Aviv University: 2010–11, 2011–12, 2013–14, 2018–19
