= 2020–21 Ligat Nashim =

23rd season of women's league football under the Israeli Football Association

Israeli Women's Premier League
- Season: 2020–21
- Champions: Kiryat Gat

The 2020–21 Ligat Nashim was the 23rd season of women's league football under the Israeli Football Association.

The defending champions were Ramat HaSharon.

== Ligat al ==
Team	Location	Stadium	Capacity
ASA Tel Aviv University	Tel Aviv	Tel Aviv University Football Stadium	1,000
Kiryat Gat	Kiryat Gat	Rogozin Synthetic grass pitch, Kiryat Gat	1,000
Maccabi Kishronot Hadera	Hadera	Hapoel Hadera Stadium	5,000
Maccabi Holon	Holon	Holon Municipal Stadium	3,000
F.C. Ramat HaSharon	Ramat HaSharon	Grundman Stadium	4,300
Hapoel Be'er Sheva	Be'er Sheva	Turner Stadium	16,126
Hapoel Petah Tikva	Petah Tikva	HaMoshava Stadium	11,500
Hapoel Ra'anana	Ra'anana	Karnei Oren Memorial Field	2,500
Bnot Netanya	Netanya	Shapira Training Ground	1,000
Maccabi Emek Hefer	Emek Hefer		

=== League table ===
Pos	Team	Pld	W	D	L	GF	GA	GD	Pts	Qualification or relegation (Note: Teams play each other two times (14 rounds) before the league is split into two groups (the top four and the bottom four).)
1	Kiryat Gat	18	13	4	1	38	8	+30	43	Qualification for the Champions League
2	Bnot Netanya	18	12	1	5	36	29	+7	37	
3	Maccabi Emek Hefer	18	11	4	3	54	24	+30	37	
4	ASA Tel Aviv University	18	10	5	3	35	16	+19	35	
5	Ramat HaSharon	18	9	4	5	36	19	+17	31	
6	Hapoel Ra'anana	18	9	1	8	34	28	+6	28	
7	Maccabi Kishronot Hadera	18	6	4	8	23	28	−5	22	
8	Hapoel Be'er Sheva	18	4	3	11	26	37	−11	15	
9	Hapoel Petah Tikva	18	2	2	14	18	57	−39	8	Relegation play-offs
10	Maccabi Holon	18	0	0	18	0	54	−54	0	Relegation to Liga Leumit

Source: IFA
Rules for classification: 1) Points; 2) Matches won; 3) Head-to head 4) deciding match.
