= Julie Karn =

Canadian dancer and soccer player (born 1996)

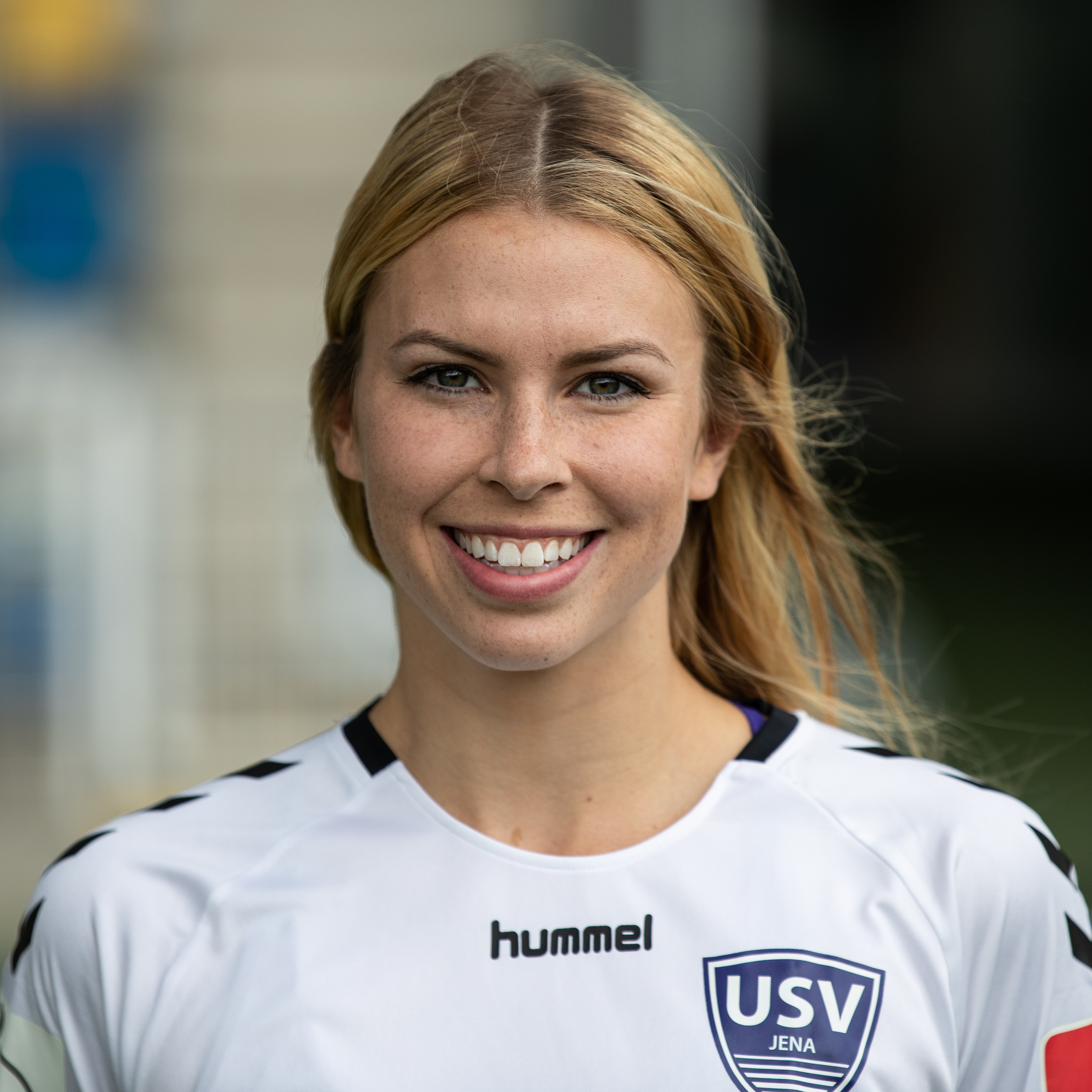
- Karn with FF USV Jena in 2019

Personal information
- Full name: Julie Elizabeth Karn
- Date of birth: 26 January 1996 (age 30)
- Height: 1.68 m (5 ft 6 in)
- Position: Midfielder

Youth career
- 2004–2005: Huntsville Strikers
- 2005–2008: Waterloo Phoenix
- 2008–2010: Burlington Tornados
- 2010–2013: Brampton Angels

College career
Years	Team	Apps	(Gls)
2014–2017	Wilfrid Laurier Golden Hawks		
2018	Guelph Gryphons	8	(2)

Senior career*
Years	Team	Apps	(Gls)
2013–2015	Kitchener-Waterloo United		
2019–2020	FF USV Jena	4	(0)
2020–2021	ASA Tel Aviv University		
- Guelph United
- * Club domestic league appearances and goals as of 29 September 2026

Julie Elizabeth Karn (born 26 January 1996) is a Canadian professional dancer and former soccer player who played as a midfielder in Germany's Frauen-Bundesliga and Israel's Ligat Nashim.

Karn played university soccer for the Wilfrid Laurier Golden Hawks and the Guelph Gryphons, and semi-professionally for Kitchener-Waterloo United, before signing her first professional contract with FF USV Jena in July 2019. After an injury-affected debut season in the Frauen-Bundesliga, she joined ASA Tel Aviv University for the 2020–21 Ligat Nashim season, and later played for Guelph United in League1 Ontario. A dancer since childhood, she has toured internationally as a backup dancer for The Weeknd and performed at the 67th Annual Grammy Awards.

== Early life ==
Karn grew up in Waterloo, Ontario, in a family with German roots; her father, Dennis, played soccer in his youth, and her mother was a dancer. She began playing organized soccer in 2004 with the Huntsville Strikers, and went on to play youth soccer for Waterloo Phoenix from 2005 to 2008, the Burlington Tornados from 2008 to 2010 and the Brampton Angels from 2010 to 2013. Her parents supported her in both sports, and when a youth coach told her she could not continue to play soccer while dancing, she moved to another club rather than give up either. She attended Bluevale Collegiate Institute in Waterloo.

== Club career ==
=== University and semi-professional career ===
From 2013 to 2015, Karn played for the semi-professional Kitchener-Waterloo United. She joined the Wilfrid Laurier Golden Hawks in 2014 while studying kinesiology at Wilfrid Laurier University, and played as a midfielder for the team through the 2017 season. She was named an Ontario University Athletics (OUA) second-team all-star in 2015, and was a U Sports Academic All-Canadian in 2016 and 2017. In March 2017, as a third-year student, she received the university's Outstanding Women of Laurier award, which recognizes its female student-athletes. While at Laurier, she spent two summers training with Bristol City of England's top women's league, followed by a trial in Germany with 1. FFC Frankfurt. She then enrolled in a master's program in human health and nutritional sciences at the University of Guelph, and joined the Guelph Gryphons as a midfielder for the 2018 season. She made eight appearances off the bench and scored twice: in a 5–0 win at Windsor on 21 October 2018 and in a 2–1 home defeat to McMaster on 28 October, the Gryphons' final game of the season.

=== FF USV Jena ===
In late July 2019, Karn signed with FF USV Jena ahead of the 2019–20 Frauen-Bundesliga season, joining from the Guelph Gryphons. Jena's new head coach, Chris Heck, had first seen her during her trial at Frankfurt and described her as a player he had wanted to sign; the club presented her as a fast, right-footed wide midfielder who was strong in duels. Playing in Germany carried added meaning for her because of her family's German heritage.

An injury sustained in training limited her playing time, and she was close to returning when the COVID-19 pandemic struck. She made four Frauen-Bundesliga appearances, and Jena were relegated to the 2. Frauen-Bundesliga at the end of the season. Describing her first professional season as "a little bit chaotic", Karn said in July 2020 that she hoped to continue playing in a top division abroad.

=== ASA Tel Aviv University ===
Karn joined ASA Tel Aviv University of the Israeli Ligat Nashim for the 2020–21 season, scoring twice for the club.

=== Return to Canada ===
A broken hand, together with the effects of the COVID-19 pandemic, limited her opportunities abroad, and Karn returned to Waterloo Region, where she played for Guelph United in League1 Ontario.

== Dance career ==
Karn began dancing at the age of two, following her older sister, Tanya, to the studio, and trained at Bojangles Dance Arts in Kitchener and the Joanne Chapman School of Dance. From the age of 14 she appeared in music videos, on television and in films, and at the MuchMusic Video Awards, dancing for artists including Shawn Desman, Nick Jonas, Jason Derulo, Serena Ryder and Kira Isabella. She also toured China as a dancer with her sister, and before leaving for Germany in 2019 she filmed for a Netflix production. Although she set dance aside to concentrate on soccer while at Laurier, she co-owned and co-directed Battle of the Next Generation with her sister, an initiative aimed at mentoring young dancers entering the professional industry. On joining Jena in 2019, she said she hoped to work as a dance teacher in the city.

After her playing career, Karn was studying to become a chiropractor when she auditioned successfully to join the dance troupe of The Weeknd, with whom she performed in more than 100 shows across North America, Europe, South America and Australia over the following three years. Her appearances included sold-out concerts at the Etihad Stadium and Wembley Stadium in England and the singer's performance at the 67th Annual Grammy Awards. She has also performed with Jennie at Coachella and in Beyoncé's 2024 NFL halftime show. Between tours she teaches dance, and she has also run a dance convention with her sister.

== Personal life ==
Karn holds a bachelor's degree in kinesiology from Laurier and a master's degree in human health and nutritional sciences from Guelph. As of 2025, she divided her time between Los Angeles and Waterloo Region.

== Honours ==
Individual

- OUA women's soccer second-team all-star: 2015
- U Sports Academic All-Canadian: 2016, 2017
- Outstanding Women of Laurier award: 2016–17
