= 2017–18 Ligat Nashim =

Israeli Women's Premier League
- Season: 2017–18
- Champions: F.C. Kiryat Gat
- Champions League: F.C. Kiryat Gat
- Matches: 104
- Goals: 400 (3.85 per match)
- Top goalscorer: Tabatha; F.C. Ramat HaSharon (30)

The 2017–18 Ligat Nashim was the 20th season of women's league football under the Israeli Football Association. League schedule began on 31 October 2017. The defending champions are F.C. Kiryat Gat, having won the title the previous season.

In the premier league, F.C. Kiryat Gat won its first championship while Hapoel Petah Tikva relegated. Hapoel Be'er Sheva won Women's Liga Leumit and was promoted to the top division.

== Premier League ==
Pos	Team	Pld	W	D	L	GF	GA	GD	Pts	Qualification or relegation (Note: Teams play each other two times (18 rounds) before the league is split into two groups (the top five and the bottom four).)
1	F.C. Kiryat Gat	24	21	1	2	95	21	+74	64	Qualification for the Champions League
2	F.C. Ramat HaSharon	24	21	0	3	82	12	+70	63	
3	Maccabi Kishronot Hadera	24	15	3	6	45	27	+18	48	
4	ASA Tel Aviv University	24	9	1	14	41	57	−16	28	
5	Maccabi Holon	24	6	3	15	35	72	−37	21	
6	Hapoel Ra'anana	22	9	4	9	42	31	+11	31	
7	Youth Academy	22	9	3	10	38	42	−4	30	
8	Bnot Netanya	22	3	3	16	16	60	−44	12	Relegation play-offs
9	Hapoel Petah Tikva	22	1	2	19	9	81	−72	5	Relegation to Liga Leumit

Updated to match(es) played on 29 May 2018. Source: Israel Football Association
Rules for classification: 1) Points; 2) Matches won; 3) Head-to head 4) deciding match.

=== Results ===
==== Matches 1–22 ====
Home \ Away	ASA	BNE	KGT	RMS	IPT	HRA	MHL	MKH	YTH
ASA Tel Aviv University	—	4–0	1–2	0–2	6–0	2–1	2–1	1–2	2–0
Bnot Netanya	1–1	—	1–4	0–4	0–3 (Note: Bnot Netanya originally won 2–0. The match was given to Hapoel Petah Tikva as Bnot Netanya fielded an ineligible player.)	0–7	1–3	0–2	0–4
F.C. Kiryat Gat	8–2	4–0	—	1–2	5–0	2–1	5–3	4–1	4–0
F.C. Ramat HaSharon	4–0	8–0	1–2	—	7–0	4–0	6–0	0–2	6–0
Hapoel Petah Tikva	0–2	0–0	0–3	0–4	—	0–3	2–2	0–5	0–2
Hapoel Ra'anana	1–2	3–0	0–3	0–3	2–0	—	1–0	1–1	1–1
Maccabi Holon	4–1	2–1	0–5	1–5	2–1	3–1	—	0–1	5–2
Maccabi Kishronot Hadera	2–1	3–1	1–1	0–4	3–1	3–0	1–0	—	3–0
Youth Academy	3–1	2–1	1–7	0–2	5–0	1–2	1–1	0–3	—

Updated to match(es) played on 20 February 2018. Source: Liga Leumit IFA
Legend: Blue = home team win; Red = away team win.

==== Matches 19–28 ====
Home \ Away	ASA	KGT	RMS	MHL	MKH
ASA Tel Aviv University	—	1–3	0–2	6–2	1–3
F.C. Kiryat Gat	6–0	—	1–0	9–0	2–0
F.C. Ramat HaSharon	5–0	3–2	—	3–1	3–2
Maccabi Holon	3–4	1–8	0–3 (Note: The match was abandoned at half-time with Ramat HaSharon leading 1–0 as the designated medic left the stadium and no replacement was found. Ramat HaSharon was given a 3–0 win.)	—	0–2
Maccabi Kishronot Hadera	2–1	2–4	0–1	1–1	—

Updated to match(es) played on 29 May 2018. Source: Liga Leumit IFA
Legend: Blue = home team win; Red = away team win.
Notes:

Home \ Away	BNE	IPT	HRA	YTH
Bnot Netanya	—	2–0	0–0	0–3
Hapoel Petah Tikva	1–6	—	1–4	0–6
Hapoel Ra'anana	2–1	9–0	—	1–2
Youth Academy	0–1	3–0	2–2	—

Updated to match(es) played on 25 April 2018. Source: Liga Leumit IFA
Legend: Blue = home team win; Red = away team win.

=== Positions by round ===
The table lists the positions of teams after each week of matches. Note that Championship round teams will play in 28 matchdays, and the Relegation round teams will compete in only 24 matches.

Team ╲ Round	1	2	3	4	5	6	7	8	9	10	11	12	13	14	15	16	17	18	19	20	21	22	23	24	25	26	27	28
F.C. Kiryat Gat	3	1	1	1	1	1	2	2	1	2	2	2	2	1	1	2	2	1	2	1	1	1	1	1	2	1	1	1
F.C. Ramat HaSharon	6	4	2	2	2	2	1	1	2	1	1	1	1	2	2	1	1	2	1	2	2	2	2	2	1	2	2	2
Maccabi Kishronot Hadera	1	3	3	4	6	3	3	3	3	3	3	3	3	3	3	3	3	3	3	3	3	3	3	3	3	3	3	3
ASA Tel Aviv University	5	9	7	7	5	7	7	6	7	7	7	7	7	7	7	7	5	4	4	4	4	4	4	4	4	4	4	4
Maccabi Holon	3	2	4	5	3	4	4	4	4	4	4	4	4	4	5	5	6	5	5	5	5	5	5	5	5	5	5	5
Hapoel Ra'anana	1	5	6	6	7	6	5	5	5	5	5	5	5	5	4	4	4	6	6	6	6	6	6	6				
Youth Academy	8	7	5	3	4	5	6	7	6	6	6	6	6	6	6	6	7	7	7	7	7	7	7	7				
Bnot Netanya	8	8	9	9	9	9	9	9	9	9	8	9	9	9	9	9	9	9	9	9	8	8	8	8				
Hapoel Petah Tikva	6	6	8	8	8	8	8	8	8	8	9	8	8	8	8	8	8	8	8	8	9	9	9	9				

=== Top scorers ===
Rank	Scorer	Club	Goals
1	(Brazil) Tabatha	F.C. Ramat HaSharon	30
2	(Romania) Andreea Laiu	F.C. Kiryat Gat	29
3	(Israel) Mor Efraim	F.C. Kiryat Gat	16
4	(Nigeria) Amanza Mercy	Maccabi Holon	15
5	(Israel) Danielle Schulmann	F.C. Kiryat Gat	13

== Leumit League ==
Women's Leumit League
- Season: 2017–18
- Champions: Hapoel Be'er Sheva
- Matches: 58
- Goals: 396 (6.83 per match)
- Top goalscorer: Walaa Hussein; Hapoel Be'er Sheva (35)

Pos	Team	Pld	W	D	L	GF	GA	GD	Pts	Qualification or relegation (Note: Teams play each other two times (14 matches) before the league is split into two groups (the top four and the bottom four).)
1	Hapoel Be'er Sheva	18	17	1	0	144	5	+139	52	Promotion
2	Bnot Eilat	18	14	1	3	59	32	+27	43	promotion play-offs
3	Maccabi Tzur Shalom Bialik	18	8	1	9	46	69	−23	25	
4	Beitar Ironi Ma'ale Adumim	18	5	1	12	32	68	−36	16	
5	Maccabi Bnot Emek Hefer	16	8	0	8	77	47	+30	24	
6	Hapoel Bnot Pardesiya	16	5	0	11	33	68	−35	15	
7	Maccabi Be'er Sheva	16	1	0	15	13	115	−102	3	
8	Bnot Sakhnin (Note: Bnot Sakhnin registered to play in Liga Leumit, but withdrew before playing any matches.)	0	0	0	0	0	0	0	0	Folded

Updated to match(es) played on 20 February 2018. Source: Israel Football Association
Rules for classification: 1) Points; 2) Matches won; 3) Head-to head 4) deciding match.

=== Results ===
==== Matches 1–14 ====
Home \ Away	BMA	BEL	HBS	HBP	MBS	MEH	MZS
Beitar Ironi Ma'ale Adumim	—	1–3	0–5	1–0	2–4	2–1	2–2
Bnot Eilat	5–0	—	1–1	5–0	7–0	5–0	3–1
Hapoel Be'er Sheva	3–0	6–1	—	10–0	3–0	11–0	14–0
Hapoel Bnot Pardesiya	1–4	0–3	0–11	—	4–2	0–3	3–4
Maccabi Be'er Sheva	1–7	1–3	0–13	0–6	—	1–11	1–8
Maccabi Bnot Emek Hefer	4–3	1–2	1–12	8–0	12–0	—	3–4
Maccabi Tzur Shalom Bialik	2–3	0–3	2–4	4–3	7–2	2–0	—

Updated to match(es) played on 24 February 2018. Source: Liga Leumit IFA
Legend: Blue = home team win; Red = away team win.

==== Matches 15–20 ====
Home \ Away	BMA	BEL	HBS	MZS
Beitar Ironi Ma'ale Adumim	—	3–7	0–6	0–3
Bnot Eilat	3–0	—	0–9	3–1
Hapoel Be'er Sheva	12–0	8–0	—	8–0
Maccabi Tzur Shalom Bialik	6–4	0–5	0–8	—

Updated to match(es) played on 22 April 2018. Source: Liga Leumit IFA
Legend: Blue = home team win; Red = away team win.

Home \ Away	HBP	MBS	MEH
Hapoel Bnot Pardesiya	—	8–0	5–3
Maccabi Be'er Sheva	1–3	—	0–9
Maccabi Bnot Emek Hefer	9–0	12–0	—

Updated to match(es) played on 24 February 2018. Source: Liga Leumit IFA
Legend: Blue = home team win; Red = away team win.

=== Positions by round ===
The table lists the positions of teams after each week of matches. Note that Top Playoff teams will play in 20 matchdays, and the Bottom Playoff teams will compete in only 17 matches.

Team ╲ Round	1	2	3	4	5	6	7	8	9	10	11	12	13	14	15	16	17	18	19	20
Hapoel Be'er Sheva	1	1	1	2	1	2	1	1	1	1	2	1	1	1	1	1	1	1	1	1
Bnot Eilat	3	3	2	1	2	1	2	2	2	2	1	2	2	2	2	2	2	2	2	2
Maccabi Tzur Shalom Bialik	4	4	3	3	3	3	3	3	3	3	3	3	3	3	3	3	3	3	3	3
Beitar Ironi Ma'ale Adumim	8	7	4	4	4	5	5	5	5	4	4	4	4	4	4	4	4	4	4	4
Maccabi Bnot Emek Hefer	5	8	7	7	6	4	4	4	4	5	5	5	5	5	5	5	5	5	5	5
Hapoel Bnot Pardesiya	2	2	6	5	5	6	6	6	6	6	6	6	6	6	6	6	6	6	6	6
Maccabi Be'er Sheva	6	5	5	6	7	7	7	7	7	7	7	7	7	7	7	7	7	7	7	7
Bnot Sakhnin	7	6	-	-	-	-	-	-	-	-	-	-	-	-	-	-	-	-	-	-

== Test Match ==
2 May 2017
18:30 UTC+3

Bnot Netanya	3–0	Bnot Eilat
Ezurike 30', 75'; Adeboyejo 43'	Report

Ramat Gan Stadium
Referee: Meitar Shemesh

Bnot Netanya remained in the Premier League; Bnot Eilat remained in Leumit League.
