= Hapoel Kfar Saba F.C. (women) =

Hapoel Kfar Saba
- Full name: Hapoel Kfar Saba Football Club הפועל כפר סבא
- Founded: 2016
- Ground: Levita Synthetic Pitch, Kfar Saba
- Manager: Yariv Damti
- League: Women's Leumit League

Hapoel Kfar Saba (Hebrew: הפועל כפר סבא) is an Israeli women's football club from Kfar Saba competing in the Israeli Second Division and the Israeli Women's Cup.

== History ==
The club was established in 2016, as the activities of Maccabi Kfar Saba was taken over by Hapoel Kfar saba. and entered the league's second division ahead of the 2016–17 season.
