= 2010–11 Ligat Nashim =

Ligat Nashim Rishona
- Season: 2010–11
- Matches: 80
- Goals: 315 (3.94 per match)
- Top goalscorer: Silvi Jan (36)

The 2010–11 Ligat Nashim was the 13th season of women's league football under the Israeli Football Association.

The league was won by ASA Tel Aviv University, its second consecutive title and third overall. By winning, ASA Tel Aviv qualified to 2011–12 UEFA Women's Champions League.

For the first time since the establishment of Ligat Nashim, a second division was established, competed by 5 clubs. Hapoel Be'er Sheva won the division and was promoted to Ligat Nashim Rishona.

== Format changes ==
For the first time since its establishment, the league was divided into two tiers, with 8 clubs in the first division (called Ligat Nashim Rishona, lit. First Women's League) and 5 in the second division (called Ligat Nashim Shniya, lit. Second Women's League).

In the first division, the participating clubs first played a conventional round-robin schedule for a total of 14 rounds, after which the 4 top clubs played a championship play-off, while the bottom 4 clubs played a relegation play-off, with clubs in each group playing a round-robin schedule of another 6 matches between them. Points earned in the regular season were kept by the clubs. The top club at the Championship Group would win the championship and qualify to 2011–12 UEFA Women's Champions League, while the bottom club at the Relegation Group would relegate to Ligat Nashim Shniya and the second-bottom club in the Relegation Group would compete in a promotion/relegation play-off against the second placed team from Ligat Nashim Shniya.

== Ligat Nashim Rishona ==
=== Regular season ===
Pos	Team	Pld	W	D	L	GF	GA	GD	Pts	Qualification
1	ASA Tel Aviv University	14	13	1	0	80	2	+78	40	Championship Group
2	Maccabi Holon	14	11	0	3	40	14	+26	33	Championship Group
3	Maccabi Kishronot Hadera	14	10	2	2	47	11	+36	32	Championship Group
4	Maccabi Be'er Sheva	14	7	0	7	24	31	−7	21	Championship Group
5	Bnot Sakhnin	14	6	0	8	28	31	−3	18	Relegation Group
6	Hapoel Ironi Petah Tikva	14	4	2	8	20	45	−25	14	Relegation Group
7	Maccabi Tzur Shalom Bialik	14	1	1	12	5	49	−44	4	Relegation Group
8	Hapoel Rishon LeZion	14	0	2	12	6	67	−61	2	Relegation Group

=== Championship group ===
Pos	Team	Pld	W	D	L	GF	GA	GD	Pts	Qualification
1	ASA Tel Aviv University	20	18	1	1	98	5	+93	55	Qualified to UEFA Women's Champions League
2	Maccabi Holon	20	16	0	4	50	17	+33	48	
3	Maccabi Kishronot Hadera	20	12	2	6	53	23	+30	38	
4	Maccabi Be'er Sheva	20	7	0	13	26	49	−23	21	

=== Relegation group ===
Pos	Team	Pld	W	D	L	GF	GA	GD	Pts	Qualification or relegation
1	Bnot Sakhnin	20	9	2	9	37	35	+2	29	
2	Hapoel Ironi Petah Tikva	20	7	3	10	28	53	−25	24	
3	Maccabi Tzur Shalom Bialik	20	4	2	14	12	55	−43	14	Promotion/relegation play-off
4	Hapoel Rishon LeZion	20	0	4	16	11	78	−67	4	Relegated to Ligat Nashim Shniya

==== Promotion/relegation play-off ====
17 April 2011	Maccabi Tzur Shalom Bialik	2–0	Maccabi Kishronot Hadera 2	Ilut Stadium
19:15	Gharban 18'; DeGracia 59'	Report		Referee: Guy Berger

=== Top scorers ===
Rank	Scorer	Club	Goals
1	Silvi Jan	ASA Tel Aviv University	36
2	Sarit Shenar	ASA Tel Aviv University	19
3	Adva Twil	Maccabi Kishronot Hadera	18
4	Shirley Ohana	Maccabi Holon	15
5	Levia Van Ouwerkerk	Maccabi Kishronot Hadera	14
5	Nura Abu Shanab	Bnot Sakhnin	14
7	Hanin Nassar	Bnot Sakhnin	11
8	Lee Falcom	ASA Tel Aviv University	10
9	Meital Dayan	Maccabi Holon	9
9	Karin Peretz	Maccabi Be'er Sheva	9

== Ligat Nashim Shniya ==
Ligat Nashim Shniya
- Season: 2010–11
- Matches: 40
- Goals: 307 (7.68 per match)
- Top goalscorer: Karin Rahamim (35)

=== Format ===
The participating in this division played a double round-robin schedule for a total of 16 rounds, with the top club promoting to Ligat Nashim Rishona.

=== League table ===
Pos	Team	Pld	W	D	L	GF	GA	GD	Pts	Promotion or qualification
1	Hapoel Be'er Sheva	16	15	0	1	149	6	+143	45	Promoted to Ligat Nashim Rishona
2	Maccabi Kishronot Hadera B	16	12	0	4	72	30	+42	36	Promotion play-offs
3	F.C. Ramat HaSharon	16	9	0	7	58	41	+17	26 (Note: One point deducted)	
4	F.C. Kiryat Gat	16	3	0	13	16	101	−85	9	
5	Hapoel Acre	16	1	0	15	12	129	−117	3	

=== Top scorers ===
Rank	Scorer	Club	Goals
1	Karin Rahamim	Hapoel Be'er Sheva	35
2	Amira Arkiva	Hapoel Be'er Sheva	31
3	Linoy Rogers	Hapoel Be'er Sheva	29
4	Maayan Kauffman	F.C. Ramat HaSharon	15
5	Noy Alush	Hapoel Be'er Sheva	14
