= Hapoel Acre F.C. (women) =

Defunct women's Israeli association football club

Hapoel Acre
- Full name: Hapoel Acre Women's Football Club הפועל עכו
- Founded: 2010
- Dissolved: 2011
- Ground: Tzur Shalom Stadium, Kiryat Bialik
- Capacity: 2000
- Manager: Avi Cohen
- League: Ligat Nashim Shniya
- 2010–11 Ligat Nashim Shniya: 5th

Hapoel Acre (Hebrew: הפועל עכו) was an Israeli women's football club from Acre, who competed in the Israeli Second Division and the Israeli Women's Cup. The club existed for one season only before folding.

== History ==
The club was established in 2010 and joined Ligat Nashim, entering in the second division. The club won its first match, a 3–0 victory against F.C. Kiryat Gat, but lost all its other matches in the league, scoring only 9 goals more and conceding 129 goals, finishing bottom. The club played first division's Hapoel Petah Tikva in the cup, losing 0–19, its worst defeat in its short existence. The club was also eligible to compete in the second division league cup, but chose to forfeit its matches.
