= 2016–17 Ligat Nashim =

Israeli Women's Premier League
- Season: 2016–17

The 2016–17 Ligat Nashim is the 19th season of women's league football under the Israeli Football Association. League schedule began on 8 November 2016. The defending champions are F.C. Ramat HaSharon, having won the title the previous season.

Prior to the beginning of the season the two divisions were renamed, Ligat Nashim Rishona becoming Women's Premier League and Ligat Nashim Shniya becoming Women's Leumit League.

In the premier league, F.C. Kiryat Gat won its first championship while Bnot Sakhnin relegated. Hapoel Ra'anana won Women's Liga Leumit and was promoted to the top division.

== Premier League ==
=== Regular season ===
Pos	Team	Pld	W	D	L	GF	GA	GD	Pts	Qualification or relegation
1	F.C. Kiryat Gat	16	14	1	1	58	8	+50	43	Qualification for the Championship round
2	F.C. Ramat HaSharon	16	11	2	3	37	7	+30	35	Qualification for the Championship round
3	ASA Tel Aviv University	16	11	2	3	41	19	+22	35	Qualification for the Championship round
4	Maccabi Kishronot Hadera	16	10	1	5	41	17	+24	31	Qualification for the Championship round
5	Hapoel Petah Tikva	16	8	1	7	36	17	+19	25	Qualification for the Championship round
6	Maccabi Holon	16	6	2	8	30	42	−12	20	Qualification for the Relegation round
7	Youth Academy	16	5	1	10	20	21	−1	16	Qualification for the Relegation round
8	Bnot Netanya	16	1	1	14	6	50	−44	4	Qualification for the Relegation round
9	Bnot Sakhnin	16	0	1	15	5	93	−88	1	Qualification for the Relegation round

Updated to match(es) played on 7 March 2017. Source: Israel Football Association
Rules for classification: 1) Points; 2) Matches won; 3) Play-off.

==== 2nd-3rd place match ====
As F.C. Ramat HaSharon and ASA Tel Aviv finished level on points, a match was arranged to set the placing of each team at the end of regular seasons, in order to determine the two teams' order of matches. The match was played on 7 March 2017, and was abandoned at the 55th minute, with Ramat HaSharon leading 5–0, as ASA appeared to the match with only 11 players and four of them had to leave the pitch due to injuries. Therefore, Ramat HaSharon was placed second and ASA third.

=== Championship round ===
Pos	Team	Pld	W	D	L	GF	GA	GD	Pts	Qualification or relegation
1	F.C. Kiryat Gat (C)	24	18	3	3	74	17	+57	57	Qualification for the Champions League
2	F.C. Ramat HaSharon	24	15	2	7	51	18	+33	47	
3	ASA Tel Aviv University	24	14	3	7	56	38	+18	45	
4	Maccabi Kishronot Hadera	24	14	2	8	54	32	+22	44	
5	Hapoel Petah Tikva	24	10	3	11	41	26	+15	33	

Updated to match(es) played on 14 May 2017. Source: Israel Football Association
Rules for classification: 1) Points; 2) Matches won; 3) Play-off.
(C) Champions

=== Relegation round ===
Pos	Team	Pld	W	D	L	GF	GA	GD	Pts	Qualification or relegation
6	Maccabi Holon	22	10	3	9	42	52	−10	33	
7	Youth Academy	22	10	2	10	43	23	+20	32	
8	Bnot Netanya	22	2	1	19	13	62	−49	7	
9	Bnot Sakhnin (R)	22	1	1	20	9	115	−106	4	Relegation to Liga Leumit

Updated to match(es) played on 14 May 2017. Source: Israel Football Association
Rules for classification: 1) Points; 2) Matches won; 3) Play-off.
(R) Relegated

=== Top scorers ===
Rank	Scorer	Club	Goals
1	(Israel) Dovrat Bendel	F.C. Kiryat Gat	26
2	(Jamaica) Shakira Duncan	Maccabi Kishronot Hadera	21
3	(Brazil) Moara	Maccabi Holon	19
4	(Argentina) Daniela Ugarte	Hapoel Petah Tikva	16
5	(Israel) Arava Shahaf	F.C. Ramat HaSharon	15

== Leumit League ==
Pos	Team	Pld	W	D	L	GF	GA	GD	Pts	Qualification or relegation
1	Hapoel Ra'anana (C, P)	20	15	3	2	43	11	+32	48	Promotion to Women's Premier League
2	Hapoel Be'er Sheva	20	12	3	5	55	25	+30	39	
3	Hapoel Kfar Saba	20	12	1	7	58	30	+28	37	
4	Bnot Eilat	20	8	0	12	33	64	−31	24	
5	Maccabi Be'er Sheva	20	4	2	14	25	55	−30	14	
6	Maccabi Tzur Shalom Bialik	20	3	3	14	27	56	−29	12	

Updated to match(es) played on 14 May 2017. Source: Israel Football Association
Rules for classification: 1) Points; 2) Matches won; 3) Play-off.
(C) Champions; (P) Promoted
