= Mabel Effiom =

Nigerian association football player

Mabel Effiom (born 10 June 1995) is a Nigerian professional footballer who plays as a midfielder for Kazakhstani club BIIK Kazygurt.

== Youth career ==
She was scouted at age 14 by the Nigerian club Rivers Angels F.C. Effiom played for the Rivers Angels F.C. Academy 2009–2012 (Port Harcourt, Nigeria).

== Professional career ==
Effiom began her professional career in 2012 with the Academy Club.

- 2012–2014: Rivers Angels F.C. (Port Harcourt, Nigeria)
- 2014–2015: JVW F.C. (Bedfordview, South Africa)
- 2015–2016: FC Energy Voronezh (Voronezh, Russia)
- 2016–2017: Øvrevoll Hosle IL (Øvrevoll, Norway)
- 2017–2018: Rivers Angels F.C. (Port Harcourt, Nigeria)
- 2018–2020: Bnot Netanya F.C. (Netanya, Israel)
- 2020–2021: F.C. Ramat HaSharon (Ramat HaSharon, Israel)
- 2021–2022: Bnot Netanya F.C. (Netanya, Israel)
- 2022: FF Yzeure Allier Auvergne (Yzeure, France)
- 2022–2023: Bnot Netanya F.C. (Netanya, Israel)
- 2023–2024: Yenisey Krasnoyarsk (Krasnoyarsk, Russia)
- Since 2024: BIIK Kazygurt (Chimkent, Kazakhstan)

== Honors ==
- 2021–2022: Best passer of the league
- 2021–2022: On the 11 best players of the league
