= 2015–16 Ligat Nashim =

Ligat Nashim Rishona
- Season: 2015–16
- Matches: 102
- Goals: 653 (6.4 per match)
- Top goalscorer: Tiffany Cameron (35)

The 2015–16 Ligat Nashim was the 18th season of women's league football under the Israeli Football Association. First division matches were due to begin on 3 November 2015, but were delayed to start on 10 November. The defending champions are ASA Tel Aviv University, having won the title the previous season.

On 22 May 2016, in the penultimate match of the season, F.C. Ramat HaSharon secured the title, Its first ever, by defeating title rival F.C. Kiryat Gat 1–0. By winning, FC Ramat HaSharon qualified to 2016–17 UEFA Women's Champions League. At the bottom, Maccabi Be'er Sheva was relegated to Ligat Nashim Shniya.

In the second division, Bnot Netanya F.C. won the league and was promoted to the top division.

== Ligat Nashim Rishona ==
=== Regular season ===
Teams play 16 matches in the regular season.

Pos	Team	Pld	W	D	L	GF	GA	GD	Pts	Qualification
1	Maccabi Kishronot Hadera	16	14	0	2	73	11	+62	42	Championship Group
2	F.C. Ramat HaSharon	16	12	2	2	96	12	+84	38	Championship Group
3	F.C. Kiryat Gat	16	11	2	3	84	17	+67	35	Championship Group
4	ASA Tel Aviv University	16	11	2	3	80	28	+52	35	Championship Group
5	Hapoel Ironi Petah Tikva	16	6	4	6	57	32	+25	22	Championship Group
6	Youth Academy	16	6	1	9	43	27	+16	19	Relegation Group
7	Maccabi Holon	16	4	1	11	38	45	−7	13	Relegation Group
8	Bnot Sakhnin	16	1	0	15	16	91	−75	3	Relegation Group
9	Maccabi Be'er Sheva	16	1	0	15	10	234	−224	3	Relegation Group

Updated to match(es) played on 8 March 2016. Source: IFA (in Hebrew)
Rules for classification: 1st points; 2nd matches won; 3rd decision match

Home \ Away	ASA	BNS	KGT	RHS	HPT	MBS	HLN	MKH	YTH
ASA Tel Aviv		13–2	4–2	0–6	6–0	26–0	3–0	0–8	3–0
Bnot Sakhnin	1–6		0–3	1–7	1–7	8–0	0–1	0–6	1–4
F.C. Kiryat Gat	0–1	11–0		3–1	3–3	18–0	4–2	3–0	4–0
F.C. Ramat HaSharon	2–2	13–0	1–1		7–0	17–1	9–1	0–1	3–0
Hapoel Petah Tikva	0–0	3–0	1–4	0–2		17–0	2–0	0–7	0–0
Maccabi Be'er Sheva	1–12	3–0	0–20	0–19	0–22		1–12	2–9	1–17
Maccabi Holon	0–2	5–1	0–3	1–4	1–1	14–0		0–4	0–5
Maccabi Kishronot Hadera	6–1	6–0	4–3	0–1	1–0	12–1	4–0		1–0
Youth Academy	0–1	3–1	0–2	1–4	0–1	11–0	2–1	0–4	

Updated to match(es) played on 8 March 2016. Source: Israel Football Association
Legend: Blue = home team win; Yellow = draw; Red = away team win.

=== Championship group ===
Teams play eight more games, for a total of 24.

Pos	Team	Pld	W	D	L	GF	GA	GD	Pts	Qualification
1	F.C. Ramat HaSharon	24	18	4	2	112	17	+95	58	Qualification to Champions League
2	F.C. Kiryat Gat	24	16	2	6	105	31	+74	50	
3	Maccabi Kishronot Hadera	24	16	1	7	84	26	+58	49	
4	ASA Tel Aviv University	24	12	4	8	84	45	+39	40	
5	Hapoel Ironi Petah Tikva	24	9	5	10	73	49	+24	32	

Updated to match(es) played on 26 May 2016. Source: IFA (in Hebrew)
Rules for classification: 1st points; 2nd matches won; 3rd decision match

Home \ Away	ASA	KGT	RHS	HPT	MKH
ASA Tel Aviv		0–3	0–0	1–4	1–0
F.C. Kiryat Gat	4–0		0–1	6–3	1–0
F.C. Ramat HaSharon	1–0	4–2		2–0	1–1
Hapoel Petah Tikva	0–0	5–3	0–3		3–0
Maccabi Kishronot Hadera	5–2	1–2	2–4	2–1	

Updated to match(es) played on 26 May 2016. Source: Israel Football Association
Legend: Blue = home team win; Yellow = draw; Red = away team win.

=== Relegation group ===
Pos	Team	Pld	W	D	L	GF	GA	GD	Pts	Relegation
1	Youth Academy	22	11	2	9	78	28	+50	35	
2	Maccabi Holon	22	7	2	13	67	49	+18	23	
3	Bnot Sakhnin	22	3	2	17	46	105	−59	11	
4	Maccabi Be'er Sheva	22	1	0	21	11	310	−299	3	Relegation to Ligat Nashim Shniya

Updated to match(es) played on 21 April 2016. Source: IFA (in Hebrew)
Rules for classification: 1st points; 2nd matches won; 3rd decision match

Home \ Away	BNS	MBS	HLN	YTH
Bnot Sakhnin		14–1	0–0	1–1
Maccabi Be'er Sheva	0–14		0–9	0–11
Maccabi Holon	4–1	16–0		0–2
Youth Academy	8–0	12–0	1–0	

Updated to match(es) played on 29 March 2016. Source: Israel Football Association
Legend: Blue = home team win; Yellow = draw; Red = away team win.

=== Top scorers ===
Rank	Scorer	Club	Goals
1	(Canada) Tiffany Cameron	F.C. Ramat HaSharon	35
2	(Israel) Eden Avital	ASA Tel Aviv University	27
3	(Israel) Adva Twil	F.C. Ramat HaSharon	25
4	(Israel) Shira Elinav	Youth Academy	22
5	(Israel) Arava Shahaf	F.C. Ramat HaSharon	21
6	(Israel) Coral Hazan	Youth Academy	20
7	(Israel) Vered Cohen	F.C. Kiryat Gat	18
8	(Israel) Nura Abu Shanab	Hapoel Petah Tikva	17
9	(United States) Blake Stockton	Maccabi Kishronot Hadera	16
9	(Israel) Walaa Hussein	Maccabi Holon	16
9	(Paraguay) Fany Gauto	Maccabi Holon	16

== Ligat Nashim Shniya ==
Ligat Nashim Shniya
- Matches: 37
- Goals: 205 (5.54 per match)

As 5 teams registered to the second division, the participating clubs play each of their opponents four times for a total of 16 matches for each club. At the end of the season, the top placed team will be promoted to the top division.

=== League table ===
Pos	Team	Pld	W	D	L	GF	GA	GD	Pts	Promotion or relegation
1	Bnot Netanya	16	15	0	1	76	6	+70	45	Promotion to Ligat Nashim Rishona
2	Maccabi Kfar Saba	16	10	1	5	59	25	+34	31	
3	Maccabi Tzur Shalom Bialik	16	6	3	7	35	37	−2	21	
4	Hapoel Be'er Sheva	16	6	2	8	34	55	−21	20	
5	Bnot Eilat	16	0	0	16	10	91	−81	0	

Updated to match(es) played on 3 May 2016. Source: IFA (in Hebrew)
Rules for classification: 1st points; 2nd matches won; 3rd decision match

=== Results ===
Rounds 1-10

Home \ Away	BEL	BNT	HBS	MKS	MTZ
Bnot Eilat		0–12	1–6	1–4	1–4
Bnot Netanya	14–0		8–0	1–0	3–1
Hapoel Be'er Sheva	3–0	0–3		3–8	3–1
Maccabi Kfar Saba	4–0	3–4	1–3		2–3
Maccabi Tzur Shalom Bialik	7–1	0–2	0–0	1–4	

Updated to match(es) played on 19 February 2016. Source: Israel Football Association
Legend: Blue = home team win; Yellow = draw; Red = away team win.

Rounds 11-20

Home \ Away	BEL	BNT	HBS	MKS	MTZ
Bnot Eilat		0–3	3–10	3–8	0–4
Bnot Netanya	3–0		6–0	2–0	2–0
Hapoel Be'er Sheva	2–0	0–5		1–5	0–6
Maccabi Kfar Saba	4–0	2–1	5–0		7–0
Maccabi Tzur Shalom Bialik	3–0	0–7	3–3	2–2	

Updated to match(es) played on 3 May 2016. Source: Israel Football Association
Legend: Blue = home team win; Yellow = draw; Red = away team win.

=== Top scorers ===
Rank	Scorer	Club	Goals
1	(Israel) Hadar Shem Tov	Maccabi Kfar Saba	16
1	(Israel) Shaked Elimelech	Maccabi Kfar Saba	16
3	(Israel) Ortal Shoval	Maccabi Kfar Saba	14
3	(Israel) Rinat Tamam	Bnot Netnaya	14
5	(Israel) Dana Nissenboim	Bnot Netnaya	11
