= Giora Antman =

Israeli footballer and coach

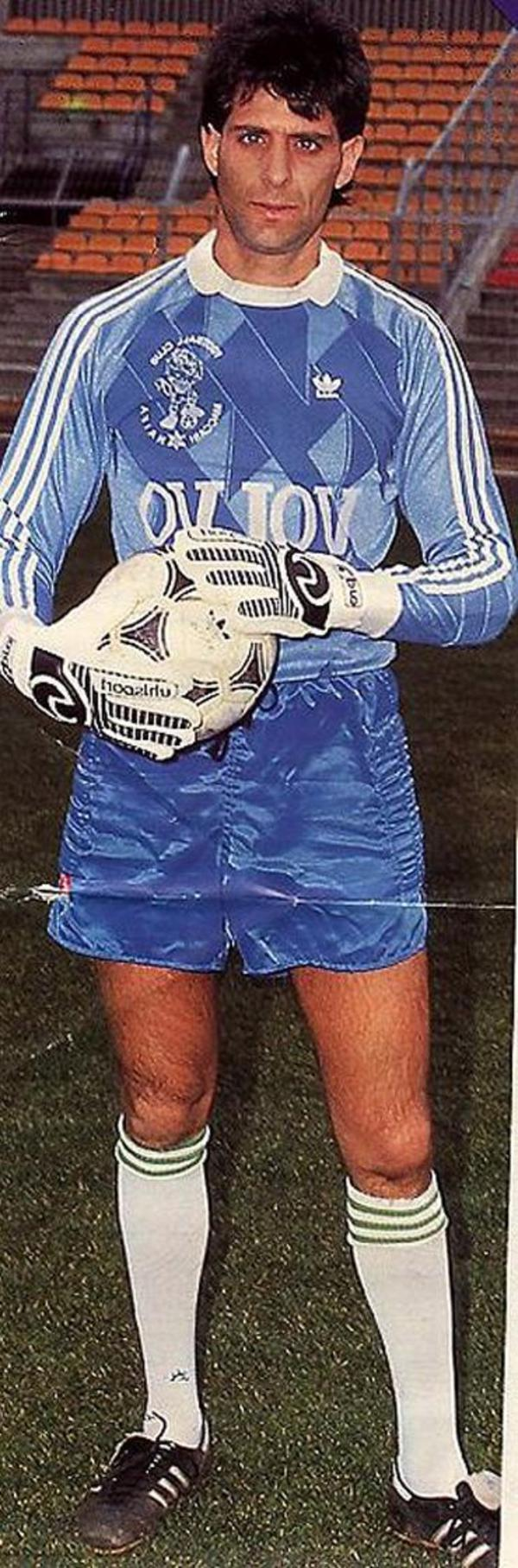

Personal information
- Full name: Giora Antman
- Date of birth: November 15, 1962 (age 63)
- Place of birth: Kiryat Motzkin, Israel
- Position: Goalkeeper

Youth career
- Hapoel Haifa

Senior career*
| Years | Team | Apps | (Gls) |
| 1980–1984 | Hapoel Haifa | | |
| 1984 | Hapoel Beit She'an | | |
| 1984–1986 | Hapoel Haifa | | |
| 1986–1987 | Hapoel Tel Aviv | | |
| 1987 | Hapoel Acre | | |
| 1987–1988 | Hapoel Be'er Sheva | | |
| 1988–1991 | Maccabi Haifa | 76 | (0) |
| 1991–1992 | Beitar Jerusalem | | |
| 1992–1993 | Hapoel Haifa | 33 | (1) |
| 1993–1994 | Hapoel Kfar Saba | 69 | (0) |
| 1994–1995 | Beitar Jerusalem | 29 | (0) |
| 1995–1996 | Maccabi Acre | | |

International career
| 1992 | Israel | 2 | (0) |

Managerial career
- 1991–2012: Maccabi Haifa (goalkeeping coach)
- 2012–Present: Israel (goalkeeping coach)
- 2012–2013: Hapoel Be'er Sheva (goalkeeping coach)
- 2013–2017: Maccabi Haifa (goalkeeping coach)
- 2017: Kerala Blasters (goalkeeping coach)
- 2018–Present: Maccabi Haifa (goalkeeping coach)
- * Club domestic league appearances and goals

Giora Antman (Hebrew: גיורא אנטמן; born 15 November 1962) is an Israeli former football player and currently the goalkeeping coach at Maccabi Haifa.

Antman was the goalkeeping coach at Maccabi Haifa for 18 years until he was replaced in 2012 by Avi Peretz. After just one season with Hapoel Be'er Sheva, Antman returned to his familiar role as goalkeeping coach for Maccabi Haifa in June 2013.

Antman's sons, Niv and Ofek both play as goalkeepers, as does his sister-in-law, Iris Antman.
