= Murita Storey =

American soccer player

Personal information
- Date of birth: September 14, 1995 (age 31)
- Place of birth: Chesapeake, Virginia, USA
- Height: 5 ft 6 in (1.68 m)
- Position: Midfielder

College career
Years	Team	Apps	(Gls)
2013–2017	Campbell Fighting Camels	78	(8)

Senior career*
Years	Team	Apps	(Gls)
2018–2020	Parquesol		
2020	Lorca Féminas		
2020	Joventut Almassora	5	(1)
2021–2022	Getafe		
2022–2023	Yzeure	15	(1)
2023–2024	Bnot Netanya		
2024–2025	Spartak Subotica		
2025	Virginia Beach City		
2025	Acharnaikos	2	(0)
- * Club domestic league appearances and goals as of 28 December 2025

Murita Storey (born September 14, 1995) is an American professional soccer player who plays as a midfielder.

== Early life and education ==
Murita Storey was born on September 14, 1995 in Chesapeake, Virginia. From an early age, Murita showed an interest in athletics, particularly soccer. She followed her older brother, Raynard's footsteps and decided to focus only on soccer. She played for Virginia Rush Soccer Club where she was coached by Vyburt Silcott, Darren Warham, Meredith Flaherty, Mercy Akide and many other reputable coaches. She went to Oscar F. Smith High School where she was named District Player of the Year as a senior in 2013.

== College career ==
Murita attended Campbell University where she balanced both academics and a busy soccer schedule. She obtained a Bachelor's of Science in Chemistry.

At Campbell, Murita was a standout soccer player. She was a Big South All-Conference Honorable Mention in 2014, NCCSIA All-State Second Team in 2015 and 2016, Big South First Team All-Conference in 2016, and a Big South All-Decade team nominee.

- 2013–2017: Campbell University (United States)

== Professional career ==
Murita transitioned to playing professionally joining Club Deportivo Parquesol in Valladolid, Spain 2018. During her time with the team, Murita played as a midfielder.

From 2018 to 2020, she played for Club Deportivo Parquesol in Spain, followed by a brief stint with Lorca Féminas Asociación Deportiva in 2020, as her season was shortened due to COVID-19. For the 2020–2021 season, Storey joined CD Castellón, also in Spain, and later moved to C.D. Getafe Femenino for the 2021–2022 season. She then spent the 2022–2023 season playing for FF Yzeure Allier Auvergne in France, before joining Bnot Netanya FC in Israel for the 2023–2024 season.

- 2018–2020: Club Deportivo Parquesol (Spain)
- 2020: Lorca Féminas Asociación Deportiva (Spain)
- 2021: CD Castellón (Spain)
- 2021–2022: CD Getafe Femenino (Spain)
- 2022–2023: FF Yzeure Allier Auvergne (France)
- 2023–2024: Bnot Netanya F.C. (Israel)

== Personal life ==
Outside of sports, Murita is fluent in English and Spanish. She is also active in managing youth programs and coaching.
