= Anas Mahamid =

Israeli footballer

Personal information
- Date of birth: 26 April 1998 (age 28)
- Place of birth: Umm al-Fahm, Israel
- Height: 1.72 m (5 ft 7 1/2 in)
- Position: Centre-forward

Team information
- Current team: Hapoel Tel Aviv
- Number: 19

Youth career
- Maccabi Umm al-Fahm
- Maccabi Barkai
- Beitar Tubruk
- –2015: Hapoel Tel Aviv

Senior career*
Years	Team	Apps	(Gls)
2015–2017	Hapoel Tel Aviv	15	(0)
2017–2019	Ironi Kiryat Shmona	5	(0)
2018	→ Hapoel Katamon (loan)	13	(2)
2018–2019	→ Hapoel Acre (loan)	9	(1)
2019	→ Beitar Tel Aviv Ramla (loan)	15	(4)
2019–2021	Winterthur	48	(6)
2022–2023	Hapoel Umm al-Fahm	33	(10)
2023–2025	Maccabi Petah Tikva	47	(12)
2025–	Hapoel Tel Aviv	10	(0)

International career
2014–2015	Israel U17	6	(2)
2015–2017	Israel U19	8	(8)
- * Club domestic league appearances and goals as of 23 June 2026

Anas Mahamid (Arabic: أنس محاميد, Hebrew: אנס מחאמיד; born 26 April 1998) is an Israeli footballer who plays as a centre-forward.

== Club career ==
=== Youth career ===
Born in 1998, Mahamid played football in several youth team including Maccabi Umm al-Fahm, Maccabi Barkai and Beitar Tubruk. He finally joined Hapoel Tel Aviv youth team.

=== Hapoel Tel Aviv ===
In 2015, Mahamid was called up for Hapoel Tel Aviv first team. On 30 August 2015, Mahamid made his professional league debut in Israeli Premier League against Hapoel Ironi Kiryat Shmona at Bloomfield Stadium, replacing Liviu Antal at the 72nd minute by coach Eli Cohen. Mahamid has played 17 games (including a game in Israel State Cup and Toto Cup) since August 2015.

=== Hapoel Ironi Kiryat Shmona ===
On 1 February 2017 signed to Hapoel Ironi Kiryat Shmona for 4.5 years.
