= 2011–12 Israeli Women's Cup =

Tournament details
- Country: Israel
- Teams: 9

Final positions
- Champions: ASA Tel Aviv University (2nd title)
- Runners-up: Maccabi Kishronot Hadera

Tournament statistics
- Matches played: 8
- Goals scored: 30 (3.75 per match)
- Top goal scorer: Silvi Jan (3)

The 2011–12 Israeli Women's Cup (Hebrew: גביע המדינה נשים, Gvia HaMedina Nashim) was the 14th season of Israel's women's nationwide football cup competition.

The competition was won by ASA Tel Aviv University who had beaten Maccabi Kishronot Hadera 2–0 in the final.

The Second Division League Cup was won by F.C. Ramat HaSharon, who had beaten Bnot Caesarea Tiv’on 5–0 in the final.

== Results ==
=== First round ===
14 February 2012	F.C. Kiryat Gat	1–2	Maccabi Kfar Saba	Ramat Gan
20:30	Asulin 33'	Report	Solomon 6'; Eitan 72'	Stadium: Ramat Gan Stadium training grounds Referee: Dror Cohen

=== Quarter-finals ===
21 February 2012	Maccabi Holon	1–1 (a.e.t.) (0–3 p)	ASA Tel Aviv University	Holon
19:00	Shino 19'	Report	Jan 46'	Stadium: Holon New Stadium; Referee: Liran Liani

21 February 2012	Bnot Sakhnin	4–1	Hapoel Petah Tikva	Sakhnin
19:30	Abu Zainab 38', 57'; Ibrahim 70'; Zubidat 83'	Report	Sages 63'	Stadium: Doha Stadium training ground Referee: Nir Amar

21 February 2012	Maccabi Be'er Sheva	1–2	Maccabi Kishronot Hadera	Be’er Sheva
	Hazan 38'		Van Ouwerkerk 2'; Sarusi 52'	Stadium: Neve Noy Stadium; Referee: Shimon Elkabetz

21 February 2012	Maccabi Kfar Saba	1–4	Hapoel Be’er Sheva	Kfar Saba
20:30	Aroch 77' (pen.)	Report	Arkiva 12', 83'; Elmaliach 20', 75'	Stadium: Levita Stadium training ground Referee: Ronen Avdilov

=== Semi-finals ===
27 March 2012	Hapoel Be’er Sheva	0–5	Maccabi Kishronot Hadera	Petah Tikva
17:00		Report	Isaev 3', 6'; Abu Shanab 50', 73'; Twil 56'	Stadium: HaMoshava Stadium; Referee: Oren Simanian

27 March 2012	ASA Tel Aviv University	5–0	Bnot Sakhnin	Petah Tikva
19:13	Lavi 2', 65'; Fridman 25', 71'; Jan 65'	Report		Stadium: HaMoshava Stadium; Referee: Idan Bernstein

=== Final ===
1 May 2012
19:45

Maccabi Kishronot Hadera	0–2	ASA Tel Aviv University
	Report	Jan 36'; Israel 40'

HaMoshava Stadium, Petah Tikva
Referee: Lilach Asulin

== Gvia Ligat Nashim Shniya ==
2011–12 Ligat Nashim Shniya Cup
Tournament details
- Country: Israel
- Teams: 5

Final positions
- Champions: F.C. Ramat HaSharon
- Runners-up: Bnot Caesarea Tiv’on

Tournament statistics
- Matches played: 6
- Goals scored: 39 (6.5 per match)
- Top goal scorer: Nofar Sakruka (7)

=== Format ===
The five second division teams were split into two groups, north and south. The two regional winners met in the final. Since the Northern group had only two teams, they played each other twice.

=== Northern group ===
Team 1	Agg.	Team 2	1st leg	2nd leg
F.C. Kafr Yasif	1–10	Bnot Caesarea Tiv’on	1–6	0–4

=== Southern group ===
Pos	Club	P	W	D	L	GF	GA	GD	Pts
1	F.C. Ramat HaSharon	2	2	0	0	15	1	14	6
2	Maccabi Kfar Saba	2	1	0	1	7	5	2	3
3	F.C. Kiryat Gat	2	0	0	2	1	17	-16	0

Home team	Score	Away team
Maccabi Kfar Saba	6–1	F.C. Kiryat Gat
F.C. Kiryat Gat	0–11	F.C. Ramat HaSharon
F.C. Ramat HaSharon	4–1	Maccabi Kfar Saba

=== Final ===
3 May 2012

F.C. Ramat HaSharon	5–0	Bnot Caesarea Tiv’on
Nofar Sakruka; Hussein; Taibi

Grundman Stadium, Ramat HaSharon
