= Guy Dahan =

Israeli footballer (born 2000)

Personal information
- Date of birth: 8 March 2000 (age 26)
- Place of birth: Tel Aviv, Israel
- Height: 1.84 m (6 ft 0 in)
- Position: Forward

Team information
- Current team: Maccabi Kiryat Gat
- Number: 9

Youth career
- –2015: Maccabi Tel Aviv
- 2015–2019: Maccabi Haifa

Senior career*
Years	Team	Apps	(Gls)
2019–2022	Maccabi Haifa	0	(0)
2019–2020	→ Hapoel Nof HaGalil (loan)	30	(3)
2020–2021	→ Hapoel Afula (loan)	37	(9)
2021	→ Ashdod (loan)	0	(0)
2021–2022	→ Hapoel Umm al-Fahm (loan)	37	(15)
2022–2023	Rheindorf Altach	0	(0)
2023	Maccabi Petah Tikva	18	(4)
2023–2024	Kafr Qasim	31	(6)
2024–2025	Hapoel Nof HaGalil	18	(7)
2025	Zimbru Chișinău	21	(8)
2026	Unirea Slobozia	15	(0)
2026–	Maccabi Kiryat Gat	6	(2)

International career
2015–2016	Israel U16	11	(3)
2015–2017	Israel U17	18	(3)
2017	Israel U18	2	(0)
2018–2019	Israel U19	9	(2)
- * Club domestic league appearances and goals as of 17 September 2026

Guy Dahan (Hebrew: גיא דהן; born 8 March 2000) is an Israeli professional footballer who plays as a forward for Liga Leumit club Maccabi Kiryat Gat.
