= Mohammed Kna'an =

Israeli footballer

Mohammed "Hamoudi" Kna'an مُحَمَّد "خَمُّودِيّ" كَنعَان
Personal information
- Full name: Mohammed Kna'an
- Date of birth: 14 January 2000 (age 26)
- Place of birth: Majd al-Krum, Israel
- Position: Forward

Team information
- Current team: Hapoel Be'er Sheva
- Number: 8

Youth career
- 2008–2009: Majd al-Krum
- 2011–2018: Maccabi Haifa
- 2018–2019: Ashdod

Senior career*
Years	Team	Apps	(Gls)
2018–2025	Ashdod	149	(33)
2025–	Hapoel Be'er Sheva	20	(3)

International career^{‡}
2015–2016	Israel U16	5	(0)
2016–2017	Israel U17	15	(3)
2017	Israel U18	2	(0)
2017–2019	Israel U19	21	(5)
2019–2023	Israel U21	8	(0)
2022–	Israel	3	(1)
- * Club domestic league appearances and goals as of 23:38, 26 October 2026 (UTC) ‡ National team caps and goals as of 10:30, 19 October 2026 (UTC)

Mohammed "Hamoudi" Kna'an (or Hamode Kanaan, Arabic: مُحَمَّد "خَمُّودِيّ" كَنعَان, Hebrew: מוחמד "חמודי" כנעאן; born 14 January 2000) is an Israeli professional footballer who plays as a forward for Israeli Premier League club Hapoel Be'er Sheva and the Israel national team.

== Early life ==
Kna'an was born in Majd al-Krum, Israel, to a Muslim-Arab family.

== Club career ==
Kna'an started his early youth career in his hometown's F.C. Majd al-Krum academy. When he was 11, he joined the Maccabi Haifa youth academy. On 19 July 2018 he joined the F.C. Ashdod youth, for 5 years.

On 20 December 2018, Kna'an made his senior debut for F.C. Ashdod in the Israel State Cup, coming on as a 79th minute substitute against Hapoel Ramat Gan, that ended in a 2–0 home win.

== International goals ==
No.	Date	Venue	Opponent	Score	Result	Competition
1.	11 June 2024	Szusza Ferenc Stadion, Budapest, Hungary	Belarus	4–0	4–0	Friendly

== Honours ==
Hapoel Beer Sheva

- Israeli Premier League: 2025–26
- Israel Super Cup: 2025
