= Maccabi Kfar Saba F.C. (women) =

Maccabi Kfar Saba
- Full name: Maccabi Kfar Saba Football Club מכבי כפר סבא
- Founded: 2011
- Dissolved: 2016
- Ground: Levita Synthetic Pitch, Kfar Saba
- Manager: Daniel Oszalk
- League: Ligat Nashim Shniya
- 2015–16: 2nd

Maccabi Kfar Saba (Hebrew: מכבי כפר סבא) was an Israeli women's football club from Kfar Saba competing in the Israeli Second League and the Israeli Women's Cup.

== History ==
The club was established in 2011 and entered the league's second division in 2012. The club finished as runners-up in its first season, and wasn't promoted to the top division. The next season the club qualified to the promotion group of the league, but finished third.

In the cup, the club's passed the first round in its first attempt, beating F.C. Kiryat Gat 2–1 in 2011–12, before losing 1–4 to Hapoel Be'er Sheva in the quarter-finals. Since then the club didn't manage to advance past the first round. The club also competed in the Second Division League Cup, in which it didn't manage to win a match.

At the end of the 2015–16 season the football team moved its activities to Hapoel Kfar Saba, with most of the players and staff continuing in the new club, which was registered to play in the second division.
