= Karin Rahamim =

Israeli footballer

Karin Rahamim קרין רחמים
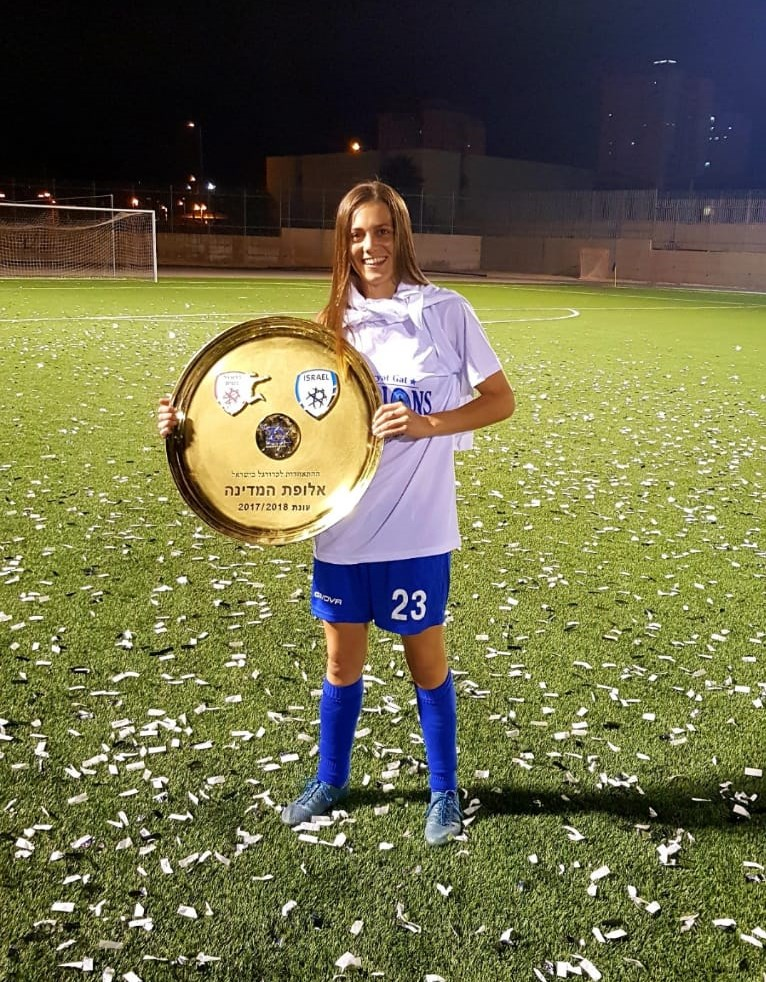
- Karin Rahamim with the championship plate for the 2017/2018 season, with Kiryat Gat club

Personal information
- Date of birth: 23 June 1989 (age 37)
- Place of birth: Ashkelon, Israel
- Position: Forward

Team information
- Current team: Kiryat Gat
- Number: 23

Senior career*
Years	Team	Apps	(Gls)
2006–2013	Hapoel Be'er Sheva	138	(105)
2014–	Kiryat Gat	130	(22)

International career^{‡}
2007	Israel U19	2	(0)
2018–	Israel	4	(0)
- * Club domestic league appearances and goals as of 6 December 2021 ‡ National team caps and goals as of 6 December 2021

Karin Rahamim (Hebrew: קרין רחמים; born 23 June 1989) is an Israeli footballer who plays as a forward for Israeli club Kiryat Gat and has appeared for the Israel women's national team.

== Career ==
Rahamim has been capped for the Israel national team, appearing for the team during the 2019 FIFA Women's World Cup qualifying cycle.
