= Linoy Rogers =

Israeli footballer

Linoy Rogers לינוי רוגרס
Personal information
- Date of birth: 28 February 1994 (age 32)
- Place of birth: Dimona, Israel
- Position: Defender

Senior career*
Years	Team	Apps	(Gls)
2008–2013	Hapoel Be'er Sheva	66+	(96+)
2014–2018	Kiryat Gat	91	(8)

International career^{‡}
2011–2012	Israel U19	4	(0)
2017	Israel	3	(1)
- * Club domestic league appearances and goals as of 19:39, 30 August 2019 (UTC) ‡ National team caps and goals as of 6 December 2021

Linoy Rogers (Hebrew: לינוי רוגרס; born 28 February 1994) is an Israeli footballer who plays as a defender and has appeared for the Israel women's national team.

== Career ==
Rogers has been capped for the Israel national team, appearing for the team during the 2019 FIFA Women's World Cup qualifying cycle.
