= Danielle Schulmann =

Israeli footballer

Danielle Schulmann דניאל שולמן
Personal information
- Full name: Danielle Nicole Schulmann
- Date of birth: 22 December 1989 (age 36)
- Place of birth: Saddle River, New Jersey, U.S.
- Height: 1.60 m (5 ft 3 in)
- Position: Forward

Youth career
- 2004–2007: Northern Highlands HS

College career
| Years | Team | Apps | (Gls) |
| 2008 | Maryland Terrapins | 16 | (3) |
| 2009 | Seton Hall Pirates | | (7) |
| 2010–2012 | Connecticut Huskies | 33 | (17) |

Senior career*
| Years | Team | Apps | (Gls) |
| 2013 | Sky Blue FC | 0 | (0) |
| 2016–2017 | Sky Blue FC | 3 | (0) |
| 2017–2019 | Maccabi Kiryat Gat | | |
| 2019–2020 | Maccabi Kishronot Hadera | | |
| 2020–2021 | ASA Tel Aviv | | |

International career^{‡}
| 2016– | Israel | 11 | (3) |
- * Club domestic league appearances and goals as of October 24, 2017 ‡ National team caps and goals as of December 6, 2021

Danielle Nicole Schulmann (Hebrew: דניאל ניקול שולמן; born 22 December 1989) is a professional footballer who plays as a forward. Born in the United States, she played for the Israel women's national team.

== Early life ==
Schulmann grew up in Saddle River, New Jersey and attended Northern Highlands Regional High School.

== Personal life ==
Schulmann's father is Daniel "Tiger" Schulmann, a Kyokushin karateka from New York City. Like her father, she is Jewish, which allowed her to make aliyah and to be a full-fledged Israeli citizen. As a result of her dual nationality, she was called up to the Israel women's national team.

== Career ==
Schulmann was on the opening day roster for Sky Blue FC in April 2016.
