= Hapoel Ra'anana A.F.C. (women) =

Hapoel Ra'anana
- Full name: Hapoel Ra'anana Women's Association Football Club הפועל רעננה
- Founded: 2016; 10 years ago
- Ground: Karnei Oren Memorial Field
- Capacity: 2,500
- Chairman: Dorothy Goor
- Manager: Alon Brumer
- League: Ligat Nashim Leumit
- 2015–19: 1st (promoted)

Hapoel Ra'anana W.A.F.C. (Hebrew: הפועל רעננה) is an Israeli professional women's football club from Ra'anana competing in the Israeli Second League and the Israeli Women's Cup.

== History ==
A youth women's football club operated in Ra'anana since 2008, and in 2016 the club opened a women's team and joined Ligat Nashim, playing in second division, Liga Leumit Nashim. The club won the division in its first season and was promoted to the top division.

== Titles ==
- Israeli 2nd Division
  - Champions (1): 2016–17
