= Bnot Netanya F.C. =

Bnot Netanya
- Full name: Bnot Netanya Football Club בנות נתניה
- Founded: 2013
- Ground: Itzhak Land Training Compound, Netanya
- Chairman: Shelly Israel
- Manager: Eliko Levi
- League: Ligat Nashim, Second Division (II)
- 2023–24: 8th in First Division (relegated)

Bnot Netanya (Hebrew: בנות נתניה) is an Israeli women's football club from Netanya competing in the Israeli first League and the Israeli Women's Cup.

== History ==
The club was established in 2013 by footballer Shelly Israel and entered the league's second division. The club finished its first season in second place and competed in a promotion/relegation play-off match for a sport in the first division against Bnot Sakhnin, losing 0–7.

In the cup, the club won its first ever cup match, in the 2013–14 competition, against Maccabi Tzur Shalom Bialik 2–1, but lost in the quarter-finals to ASA Tel Aviv University 1–6. The following season the club once again met ASA Tel Aviv University in the first round and was eliminated after losing 0–11.

== Current squad ==
Note: Flags indicate national team as defined under FIFA eligibility rules; some limited exceptions apply. Players may hold more than one non-FIFA nationality.

No.	Pos.	Nation	Player
1	GK	USA	Kori Butterfield
2		ISR	Daniel Rozen
3	DF	USA	Jah-Nya Press
4	DF	USA	Lorina White
5		ISR	Noa Shemesh
6	DF	ISR	Yael Peretz
7		ISR	Fatma Hamuda
8		ISR	Shenav Ratz
11	MF	ISR	Efrat Ben Aharon
12		ISR	Malak Shahtot
13		USA	Murita Storey

No.	Pos.	Nation	Player
14	MF	ISR	Hannah Massagki
15	MF	USA	Libby Zelikowitz
17		ISR	Ofri Margalit
18		ISR	Or Aharon
19	MF	ISR	Hannah Adler
20	GK	ISR	Liraz Ohana
22		ISR	Meshi Cohen Skali
24		ISR	Ella Babila
25	DF	NGA	Mabel Effiom
—	FW	IND	Jyoti Chouhan
—	FW	USA	Olivia Wright
