= Oshrat Eni =

Israeli football defender (born 1984)

Oshrat Eni אשרת עיני
Personal information
- Full name: Oshrat Eni
- Date of birth: 15 September 1984 (age 42)
- Place of birth: Kfar Saba, Israel
- Position: Defender

Team information
- Current team: Hapoel Tel Aviv
- Number: 15

Senior career*
Years	Team	Apps	(Gls)
1999–2002	Hapoel Tel Aviv		
2002–2006	Maccabi Holon		
2006	Bnot Hadar Yosef		
2006–2010	Maccabi Holon		
2010–2012	Maccabi Be'er Sheva	43	(18)
2012–2013	Maccabi Kishronot Hadera	12	(4)
2013–2018	F.C. Ramat HaSharon	32	(5)
2019–	ASA Tel Aviv		

International career^{‡}
2001–2002	Israel U19	8	(0)
2007–2012	Israel	11	(0)
- * Club domestic league appearances and goals as of 1 September 2015 ‡ National team caps and goals as of 10 March 2015

Oshrat Eni (Hebrew: אשרת עיני; born 15 September 1984) is an Israeli football defender, currently playing for Hapoel Tel Aviv. She was a member of the Israeli national team, since making her debut in 2007, against Austria. Eni played with both Hapoel Tel Aviv and Maccabi Holon at UEFA Women's Cup, playing a total of 24 matches.

== Club career ==
Eni had played in the Israeli First League since 1999, first appearing for Hapoel Tel Aviv, where she had played until 2002 and won the double in 2001. When the team folded, Eni moved to Maccabi Holon where she played, with the exception of two months tenure at Bnot Hadar Yosef, until 2010. With Holon Eni had won 6 league championships and 7 cups.

In March 2010 Eni transferred to Maccabi Be'er Sheva, where she stayed for the next two seasons, leading the club to its best league position, 4th and the cup final. Later Eni played for Ligat Nashim clubs Maccabi Kishronot Hadera and F.C. Ramat HaSharon.

In September 2014 Eni signed with Anderlecht. However, the deal collapsed and Eni returned to play for F.C. Ramat HaSharon.

== International career ==
Eni made her debut for the Israel women's national football team in 2007 against Estonia and so far played 11 matches for the national team. Eni had also played for the U-19 national team, making 8 appearances between 2001 and 2002

== Off-field activity ==
Eni is active on behalf of Athena Israel, an organization set to promote women sport in Israel, giving lectures at schools. Eni holds a Bachelor of Arts degree in Physical Education, and had also dabbled in politics, running for the Herzliya city council in the 2013 elections.

== Honours ==
- Championships (7):
  - With Hapoel Tel Aviv: 2000–01
  - With Maccabi Holon: 2002–03, 2004–05, 2005–06, 2006–07, 2007–08, 2008–09
- Cup (8):
  - With Hapoel Tel Aviv: 2000–01
  - With Maccabi Holon: 2002–03, 2003–04, 2004–05, 2005–06, 2006–07, 2007–08, 2008–09
