= 2024 FIFA U-20 Women's World Cup final =

- Event: 2024 FIFA U-20 Women's World Cup
North Korea	Japan
(North Korea)	(Japan)
1	0
- Date: 22 September 2024
- Venue: Estadio El Campín, Bogotá
- Player of the Match: Choe Il-son (North Korea)
- Referee: Maria Sole Ferrieri (Italy)
- Attendance: 32,908

The 2024 FIFA U-20 Women's World Cup final was the final match of the 2024 FIFA U-20 Women's World Cup. The match was played at Estadio El Campín in Bogotá, on 22 September 2024.

== Road to the final ==
North Korea
Round
Japan
Opponent
Result
Group stage
Opponent
Result
Argentina
6–2
Match 1
New Zealand
7–0
Costa Rica
9–0
Match 2
Ghana
4–1
Netherlands
2–0
Match 3
Austria
2–0
Group F winners

Pos	Team	Pld	Pts
1	North Korea	3	9
2	Netherlands	3	4
3	Argentina	3	4
4	Costa Rica	3	0

Source: FIFA
Final standings
Group E winners

Pos	Team	Pld	Pts
1	Japan	3	9
2	Austria	3	6
3	Ghana	3	3
4	New Zealand	3	0

Source: FIFA
Opponent
Result
Knockout stage
Opponent
Result
Austria
5–2
Round of 16
Nigeria
2–1
Brazil
1–0
Quarter-finals
Spain
1–0 (a.e.t.)
United States
1–0
Semi-finals
Netherlands
2–0

== Match ==
=== Details ===
22 September 2024
16:00 UTC−05:00

North Korea	1–0	Japan
Choe Il-son 15'	Report

Estadio El Campín, Bogotá
Attendance: 32,908
Referee: Maria Sole Ferrieri (Italy)

North Korea	Japan

GK	21	Chae Un-gyong
RB	6	Kim Kang-mi
CB	5	Oh Sol-song
CB	3	Han Hong-ryon
LB	14	Hwang Yu-yong	(yellow card) 90+12'
RM	20	Chae Un-yong (c)
CM	17	Kim Song-ok		(substituted off) 90+6'
CM	9	Kim Song-gyong
LM	13	Jon Ryong-jong
CF	15	Choe Il-son
CF	4	Sin Hyang		(substituted off) 57'
Substitutions:
FW	7	Jong Kum		(substituted on) 57' (substituted off) 85'
FW	10	Pak Mi-ryong		(substituted on) 85'
MF	12	Choe Kang-ryon		(substituted on) 90+6'
Coach:
Ri Song-ho

GK	1	Akane Okuma
RB	2	Nana Kashimura
CB	17	Uno Shiragaki
CB	4	Hiromi Yoneda
LB	6	Rio Sasaki	(substituted off) 76'
CM	8	Aemu Oyama	(substituted off) 62'
CM	14	Shinomi Koyama (c)
RW	19	Miyu Matsunaga	(substituted off) 76'
AM	10	Manaka Matsukubo
LW	15	Miku Hayama	(substituted off) 37'
CF	13	Maya Hijikata
Substitutions:
FW	9	Chinari Sasai	(substituted on) 37'
MF	16	Suzu Amano	(substituted on) 62'
MF	5	Manaka Hayashi	(substituted on) 76'
MF	7	Fuka Tsunoda	(substituted on) 76'
Coach:
Michihisa Kano

Player of the Match:
Choe Il-son (North Korea)

Assistant referees:
Tiziana Trasciatti (Italy)
Vanessa Gomes (Portugal)
Fourth official:
Casey Reibelt (Australia)
Reserve assistant referee / Video assistant referee:
Daiana Fernández (Uruguay)

Match rules

- 90 minutes
- 30 minutes of extra time if necessary
- Penalty shoot-out if scores still level
- Maximum of twelve named substitutes
- Maximum of five substitutions, with a sixth allowed in extra time
- Maximum of three substitution opportunities, with a fourth allowed in extra time
- Maximum of one concussion substitution, granting the opposition an additional standalone substitution
