= 1999–2000 Ligat Nashim =

Ligat Nashim
- Season: 1999–2000
- Matches: 125
- Goals: 726 (5.81 per match)
- Top goalscorer: Silvi Jan (65)

The 1999–2000 Ligat Nashim was the second season of women's league football under the Israeli Football Association.

The league was won by ASA Tel Aviv University.

== League table ==
Pos	Team	Pld	W	D	L	GF	GA	GD	Pts
1	ASA Tel Aviv University	21	19	1	1	173	4	+169	58
2	Hapoel Tel Aviv	20	17	2	1	151	12	+139	53
3	Maccabi Haifa	22	17	2	3	127	13	+114	53
4	Maccabi Tel Aviv	21	14	3	4	83	21	+62	45
5	Maccabi Ahi Nazareth	22	11	1	10	30	68	−38	34
6	Hapoel Ashkelon	22	9	2	11	34	50	−16	29
7	Bnot Ramla	21	9	3	9	31	49	−18	29 (Note: 1 point deducted?)
8	Beitar Jerusalem	20	5	2	13	25	102	−77	17
9	Hapoel Marmorek	22	4	4	14	22	114	−92	15 (Note: 1 point deducted?)
10	Hapoel Petah Tikva	22	3	4	15	22	86	−64	13
11	Maccabi Ironi Holon	18	2	3	13	11	98	−87	9
12	Maccabi Netanya	19	1	1	17	17	109	−92	4

Notes:
7 matches remained unplayed at the close of the season.

== Top scorers ==
Rank	Scorer	Club	Goals
1	Silvi Jan	Hapoel Tel aviv	65
2	Sarit Shenar	ASA Tel Aviv University	44
2	Tamara Kochen	ASA Tel Aviv University	44
4	Revital Amoyal	Hapoel Tel aviv	40
5	Nati Hajaj	Maccabi Haifa	25
6	Orli Neba'a	Maccabi Haifa	18
6	Meital Dayan	Maccabi Haifa	18
8	Ilanit Mesika	Maccabi Tel Aviv	17
8	Anat Maimoni	ASA Tel Aviv University	17
10	Diana Awisat	Maccabi Tel Aviv	16
