= 2000–01 Israeli Women's Cup =

Tournament details
- Country: Israel
- Teams: 14

Final positions
- Champions: Hapoel Tel Aviv
- Runners-up: Maccabi Haifa

Tournament statistics
- Matches played: 12
- Goals scored: 68 (5.67 per match)
- Top goal scorer: Silvi Jan (7)

The 2000–01 Israeli Women's Cup (Hebrew: גביע המדינה נשים, Gvia HaMedina Nashim) was the third season of Israel's women's nationwide football cup competition.

The competition was won by Hapoel Tel Aviv who had beaten Maccabi Haifa 4–3 in the final.

== Results ==
=== First round ===
5 February 2000	Bnot Ramla	0–1	Maccabi Tel Aviv	Ramla
			Cabel	Attendance: 50; Referee: Sima Shauli

5 February 2000	Beitar Jerusalem	0–10	ASA Tel Aviv University
			Edri; Shenar; Danon; Lavi; Schwartz; Belhassen; Maimoni; Kochen

5 February 2000	Maccabi Holon	w/o	Hapoel Tel Aviv

5 February 2000	Hakoah Ramat Gan	0–1	Maccabi Ahi Nazareth	Ramat Gan
			Hassan	Stadium: Winter Stadium; Attendance: 50; Referee: Gali Turjeman

5 February 2000	Beitar Be'er Sheva	4–5	Hapoel Ashkelon	Be'er Sheva
	Tarabulski; Popolutzki; Elkabetz; D. Malka		Tinilwa; Ventura; L. Malka; Mozgerashvili	Stadium: Taubel Stadium; Attendance: 50; Referee: Moshe Buhbut

5 February 2000	Hapoel Be'er Sheva	0–7	Maccabi Haifa	Be'er Sheva
			Hajaj; Meital Dayan; Fahima; K. Knafo; Kimchi	Stadium: Vasermil Stadium; Attendance: 150; Referee: Rachel Cohen

=== Quarter-finals ===
5 March 2001	Hapoel Marmorek	1–2	Hapoel Ashkelon
	?		Mozgerashvili; Ventura

5 March 2001	Maccabi Ahi Nazareth	1–6	ASA Tel Aviv University
	Ghazmawi		Shenar; Maimoni; Lavi; Ozeri

5 March 2001	Hapoel Petah Tikva	0–5	Maccabi Haifa
			Hajaj; I. Knafo; Fahima; Dayan

5 March 2001	Maccabi Tel Aviv	0–4	Hapoel Tel Aviv
			Amoyal; Jan; Arie

=== Semi-finals ===
23 April 2001	ASA Tel Aviv University	0–5	Maccabi Haifa	Bat Yam
			K. Knafo; Dayan; Wolf; Hajaj; Fahima	Stadium: Municipal Stadium

23 April 2001	Hapoel Tel Aviv	7–2	Hapoel Ashkelon	Bat Yam
	Jan; Eni; Amsis		Ventura	Stadium: Municipal Stadium

=== Final ===
22 May 2001

Hapoel Tel Aviv	4–3	Maccabi Haifa
Jan 20', 63'; Oded 24'; Amoyal 50'	Report	Dayan 10'; Hajaj 52'; Kimchi 71'

Ramat Gan Stadium
Attendance: 20000
Referee: Arik Haimovich
