= Rebeca (footballer) =

Brazilian footballer (born 2005)

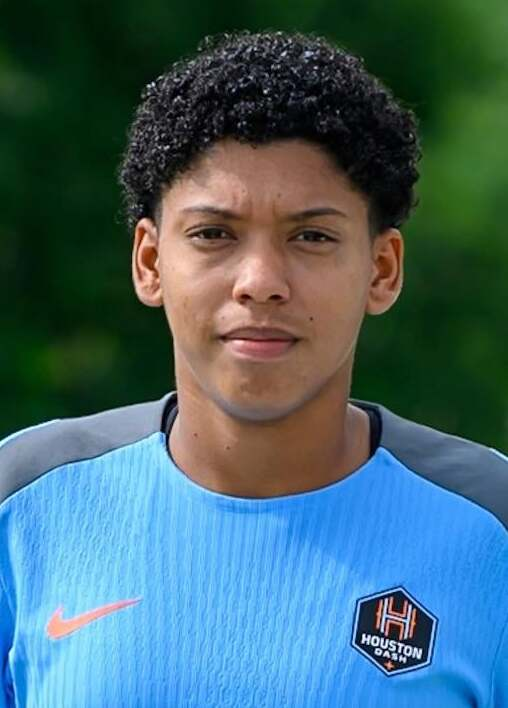
- Rebeca with the Houston Dash in 2025

Personal information
- Full name: Rebeca Costa da Silva
- Date of birth: 1 September 2005 (age 21)
- Place of birth: Pindoretama, Brazil
- Height: 1.68 m (5 ft 6 in)
- Positions: Defender; midfielder

Team information
- Current team: Dux Logroño (on loan from Houston Dash)
- Number: 23

Senior career*
Years	Team	Apps	(Gls)
2020–2023	Fortaleza		
2023–2025	Cruzeiro	25	(2)
2025–	Houston Dash	0	(0)
2025–	→ Dux Logroño (loan)	26	(1)

International career^{‡}
2022	Brazil U-17	4	(0)
2024	Brazil U-20	13	(1)
- * Club domestic league appearances and goals ‡ National team caps and goals as of 02:43, 20 August 2025 (UTC)

Rebeca Costa da Silva (born 1 September 2005) is a Brazilian professional footballer who plays as a defender for Liga F club Dux Logroño, on loan from the Houston Dash.

== Club career ==
Born in Pindoretama, Rebeca joined Fortaleza on the futsal side in 2020, soon making the youth football team. In September 2023, she moved to Cruzeiro.

In March 2025, the National Women's Soccer League (NWSL)'s Houston Dash acquired Rebeca for a transfer fee, signing her to a three-year contract with an option for an additional year. On 19 August 2025, she went on loan to newly promoted Liga F club Dux Logroño, joining alongside Dash teammate Zoe Matthews. She became a regular starter for the side as they barely avoided relegation. On 4 April 2026, she scored her first goal for Dux Logroño in a 2–1 win over Sevilla, the club's first home win of the season. In the following game, she assisted Annelie Leitner's last-second equalizer to draw 1–1 at Real Madrid.

On 2 June 2026, the Dash renewed Rebeca's loan with Dux Logroño for a second season.

== International career ==
Rebeca won the 2022 South American U-17 Women's Championship with Brazil and represented her country at the 2022 FIFA U-17 Women's World Cup. She helped them win the 2024 South American Under-20 Women's Football Championship, scoring the winning goal in a 1–0 victory over Colombia which qualified them for the 2024 FIFA U-20 Women's World Cup. She helped them advance to the quarterfinals at the 2024 FIFA U-20 Women's World Cup.

== Honors and awards ==
Cruzeiro

- Campeonato Mineiro de Futebol Feminino: 2023, 2024

Brazil U-17

- South American Under-17 Women's Football Championship: 2022

Brazil U-20

- South American Under-20 Women's Football Championship: 2024

== Personal life ==
Rebeca married Letícia Morais in 2025.
