= Anela Nigito =

Argentine footballer (born 2004)

Personal information
- Date of birth: 22 June 2004 (age 22)
- Place of birth: Mendoza, Argentina
- Height: 1.70 m (5 ft 7 in)
- Position: Centre back

Team information
- Current team: Hapoel Tel Aviv F.C.
- Number: 13

College career
Years	Team	Apps	(Gls)
2022–2024	Cal State Bakersfield Roadrunners	47	(4)

Senior career*
Years	Team	Apps	(Gls)
2016–2022	Independiente Rivadavia		
2025	Valencia B	7	(1)
2025	Valencia	1	(0)
2025–2026	REA	24	(9)
2026–	Hapoel Tel Aviv	1	(0)

International career^{‡}
2019	Argentina U17	6	(0)
2022–2024	Argentina U20	15	(1)
2023	Argentina U19	5	(0)
2024–	Argentina	1	(0)
- * Club domestic league appearances and goals as of 15 September 2026 ‡ National team caps and goals as of 15 September 2026

Anela Nigito (born 22 June 2004) is an Argentine footballer who plays as a defender for Israeli club Hapoel Tel Aviv and the Argentina national team.

== College career ==
In January 2022, Nigito received a scholarship to attend California State University, Bakersfield (CSUB) and joined the university's soccer team, the CSUB Roadrunners, on a four-year contract. During the 2024 season, she helped the team finish fifth in the regular-season standings and qualify for the conference tournament. In the quarter-finals, the Roadrunners recorded their first postseason victory, defeating three-time defending champions UC Irvine, with Nigito providing the assist for the winning goal. In the semi-finals against Hawaiʻi, she opened the scoring in the 26th minute with a penalty, helping the Roadrunners reach their first conference final. The final against UC Santa Barbara ended in a 2–2 draw, with her team ultimately losing in a penalty shoot-out.

== Club career ==
Nigito made her debut for her local club, Independiente Rivadavia, in the Liga Mendocina on 1 October 2016, at the age of 12 years, 3 months and 9 days, becoming the youngest player to represent the club. She spent seven seasons with Independiente, during which she became the club's youngest captain and the first player from the club to be called up to the Mendoza provincial team and the Argentina national under-17 team. In February 2020, she suffered a fibula fracture and ankle dislocation during training. However, she did not miss any playing time as the COVID-19 pandemic subsequently led to the postponement of the 2020 season.

On 3 January 2025, she moved to Europe to join the Valencia CF B team in the Segunda Federación. She made seven appearances and scored one goal, against CF Pozuelo. On 12 January, she made her only appearance for the senior team, coming on as a substitute in the 60th minute for Sara Tamarit against Real Sociedad.

On 7 July 2025, she joined Greek club REA. She scored nine goals in 24 league appearances as the club finished sixth. The following season, she signed for newly promoted Ligat Nashim club Hapoel Tel Aviv.

== International career ==
Anela Nigito was called up to the Argentina under-17 team in September 2019 for an under-17 international tournament against Paraguay, Chile and Uruguay. Argentina won the tournament after defeating Chile in the final. On 31 March 2022, she was named in the squad for the 2022 South American Under-20 Women's Football Championship. She played in all four matches as Argentina finished third in their group and failed to qualify for the final stage. On 30 September, she was named in the squad for the 2022 South American Games, where Argentina lost both of their matches, against Uruguay and Colombia. On 14 September 2023, Nigito was called up for the 2023 Liga Evolución U19, where Argentina finished third. In 2024, she was again named in the squad for the South American Under-20 Championship. Argentina qualified for the final stage, where they finished fourth overall. Nigito scored her first goal for the national team in a 5–0 victory over Peru. On 26 August, she was named in Argentina's squad for the 2024 FIFA U-20 Women's World Cup, where she made one appearance, against North Korea.

On 30 October 2024, Nigito made her senior international debut, coming on as a substitute in the 87th minute for Vanina Preininger in a 3–0 defeat to the United States.
