= Noam Achtel =

Israeli footballer (born 1996)

Noam Achtel נועם אכטל
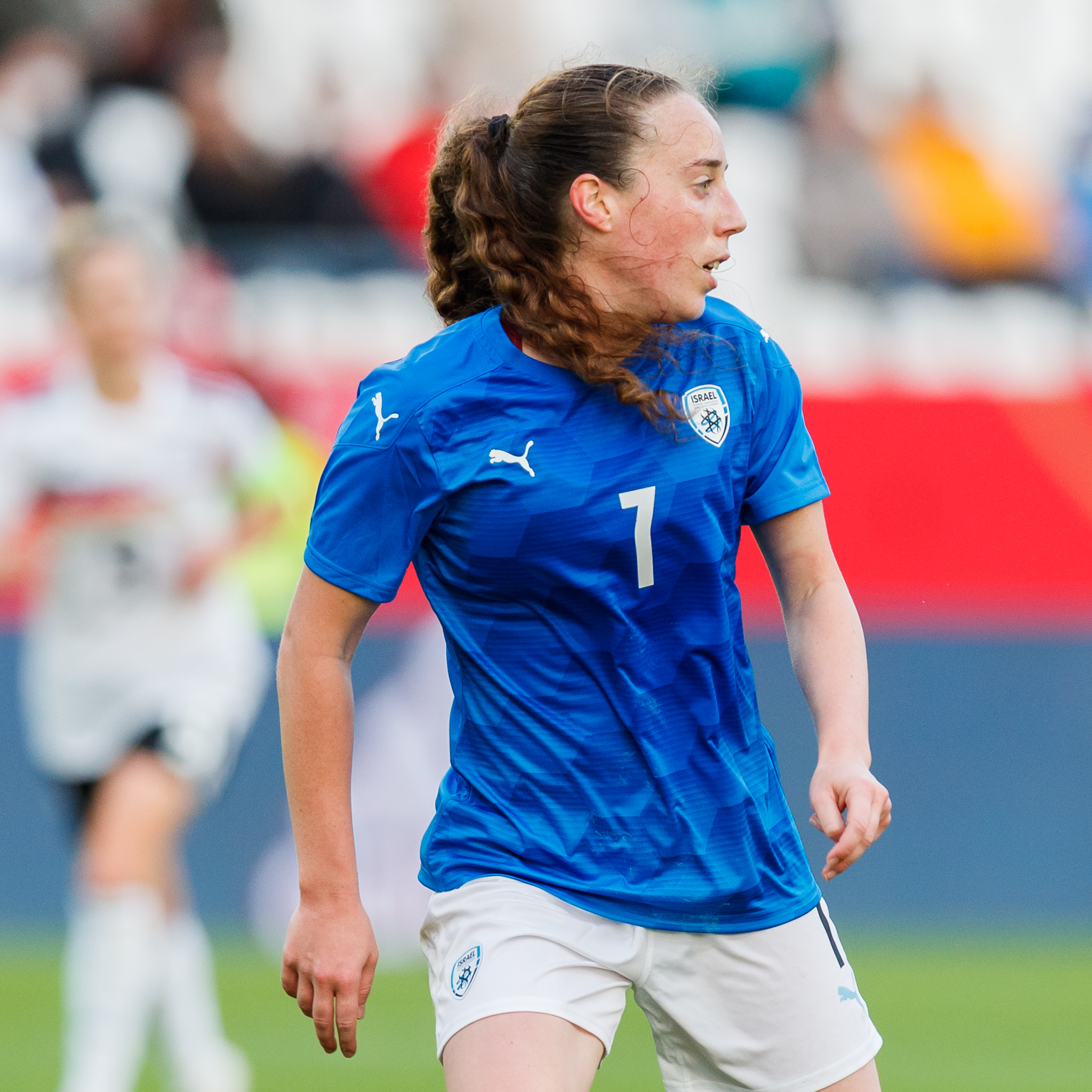

Personal information
- Date of birth: 16 April 1996 (age 30)
- Place of birth: Yagur, Israel
- Position: Defender

Youth career
- 2007–2015: Maccabi Kishronot Hadera
- 2012–2014: Girls Football Academy

Senior career*
Years	Team	Apps	(Gls)
2011–2015	Maccabi Kishronot Hadera	28	(0)
2014–2015	Girls Football Academy	4	(0)
2015–2018	Ramat HaSharon	57	(0)
2018–2021	ASA Tel Aviv	50	(0)
2021–2023	Ramat HaSharon	50	(0)
2023–2024	ASA Tel Aviv	19	(2)
2024–2025	Hapoel Tel Aviv	17	(0)

International career^{‡}
2010–2013	Israel U17	8	(0)
2013–2015	Israel U19	6	(0)
2017–	Israel	18	(0)
- * Club domestic league appearances and goals as of 4 November 2026 ‡ National team caps and goals as of 6 June 2024

Noam Achtel (Hebrew: נועם אכטל; born 16 April 1996) is an Israeli footballer who last played as a defender for Hapoel Tel Aviv and has appeared for the Israel women's national team. She has previously played for Maccabi Kishronot Hadera, Ramat HaSharon, and ASA Tel Aviv.

== Club career ==
=== Youth ===
Achtel was with Maccabi Kishronot Hadera as part of the girls' team, since 2007. She was with the club until the end of the 2014–15 season, including 28 appearances for the senior team in the Ligat Nashim. Concurrently with her time at Maccabi Kishronot Hadera, Achtel was part of the Girls Football Academy in its first years, making four appearances for the team in the senior league.

=== Ramat HaSharon ===
In 2015, Achtel joined Ramat HaSharon and played three seasons there, making 57 Ligat Nashim appearances. As winners of the 2015–16 Ligat Nashim, Achtel qualified with Ramat HaSharon for the 2016–17 UEFA Women's Champions League qualifying round in which they met SFK 2000, Kharkiv, and Rīgas FS, the champions of Bosnia and Herzegovina, Ukraine, and Latvia. Achtel came on as a substitute in the 84th minute of the 0–1 loss to SFK 2000, in the 83rd minute of the 1–0 victory over Kharkiv, and in injury time during the 4–0 victory over Rīgas FS.

=== ASA Tel Aviv ===
In 2018, Achtel joined ASA Tel Aviv and played three seasons there, making 50 Ligat Nashim appearances.

=== Return to Ramat HaSharon ===
Achtel returned to Ramat HaSharon ahead of the 2021–22 Ligat Nashim season. She was the most consistent player of the club over the season and was nominated for the league's defender of the year by the website One and the Israel Football Players Organization. In May 2023, she helped the club win the Israeli Women's Cup.

=== Return to ASA Tel Aviv ===
In July 2023, Achtel returned to ASA Tel Aviv. She scored 2 goals in 19 league appearances, as well as making 6 appearances in cup competitions.

=== Hapoel Tel Aviv ===
In August 2024, Achtel signed a one-year contract with Hapoel Tel Aviv, stating that she is excited to join a big club with tradition and a loyal and supporting fan base. In September 2024, she was involved in the "Wedding Incident", when during an Israel Women's League Cup game against Maccabi Kishronot Hadera she left the match at half time, together with Karin Sendel, Zohar Cohen, and Shai Pearl, to attend the wedding of former player Shimrit Shimriz, leaving the team with only nine players. They lost the match 6–0 and the players were fined while three staff members, including coach Micha Swisa, were fired. In March 2025, Achtel suffered a serious injury, tearing her meniscus, and was out injured for months.

== International career ==
Achtel has been capped for the Israel national team, appearing for the team during the 2019 FIFA Women's World Cup qualifying cycle.

== Style of play ==
Achtel reads the game very well, is technical, and can release pressure with long and accurate passes.
