= Beit She'an (disambiguation) =

Beit She'an (Hebrew: בֵּית שְׁאָן Bēṯ Šəʾān) is a town in the Northern District of Israel.

Beit She'an or Bet She'an may also refer to:

- Beit She'an Valley
- Beit She'an railway station
- Hapoel Beit She'an F.C., Israeli football club
- Bnot Beit She'an F.C., Israeli women's football club
