= Maccabi Netanya F.C. (women) =

Maccabi Netanya
- Full name: Maccabi Netanya Women's Football Club מכבי נתניה נשים
- Founded: 1998
- Dissolved: 2000
- League: Ligat Nashim
- 1999–2000: 12th

Maccabi Netanya (Hebrew: מכבי נתניה) was an Israeli women's football club from Netanya, a sub-division of Maccabi Netanya. The club competed in the Israeli First League and the Israeli Women's Cup, but folded in 2000, after finishing bottom of the league the previous season. The team was due to play in the league the next season, but withdrew from the league. The team was coached by Oded Machnes.
