= Shahenda El Maghrabi =

Egyptian football referee (born 1989)

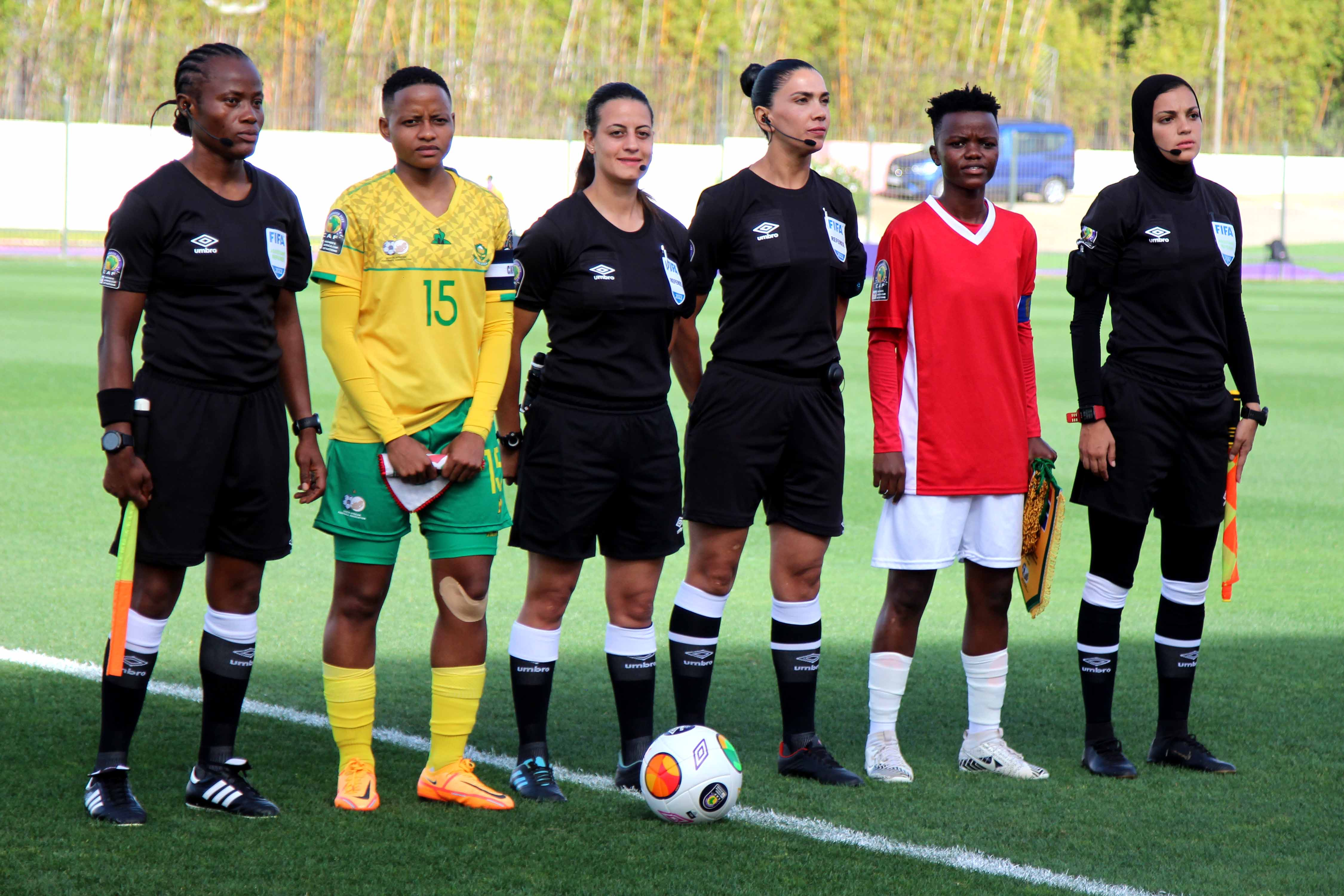
- Photo from the start of the RSA - Burundi match
- Full name: Shahenda Saad Ali El Maghrabi
- Born: 12 December 1989 (age 36); Alexandria, Egypt

Domestic
Years	League	Role
2016–	Egyptian Women's Premier League	Referee
2019–	Egypt Cup	Referee
2022–	Egyptian Premier League	Referee
2021–	CAF Women's Champions League	Referee

International
Years	League	Role
2017–	FIFA listed	Referee
2022–	Women's Africa Cup of Nations	Referee
2024	FIFA U-20 Women's World Cup	Referee
2025	U-20 Africa Cup of Nations	Referee

Shahenda Saad Ali El Maghrabi (Arabic: شاهندة سعد علي المغربي; born 12 December 1989) is an Egyptian international football referee and former footballer. She has been an international football referee since 2017.

== Career ==
Born on 12 December 1989 in the Alexandria Governorate, El Maghrabi began playing football in 2004, featuring for clubs such as Smouha, Aviation Club, and later Misr Lel Makkasa. By 2014, after spending ten years as a player, she decided to pursue a career in refereeing. She took part in the women's refereeing courses conducted by the Egyptian Football Association, earned her certification, and started officiating matches. She began her refereeing career by officiating women's football matches, both at youth and senior levels. Gradually, she started managing men's matches in youth leagues, and by the start of the 2017 season, she made her debut in the Egyptian Third and Fourth Divisions. That same year, she was also listed by FIFA as an international referee.

El Maghrabi gained a reputation as a gifted referee, with her strong presence and match control leading many to nickname her 'Shahenda Collina,' in reference to the legendary Italian referee Pierluigi Collina. On 30 August 2022, during the final match of the 2021–22 Egyptian Premier League season, El Maghrabi made history by officiating the game between Smouha and Pharco.

Since the inaugural edition of the CAF Women's Champions League in 2021, El Maghrabi has been appointed to officiate in every edition of the tournament through to the 2024 edition. In June 2022, She was selected to officiate the 2022 Women's Africa Cup of Nations, and was retained for the 2024 edition as well. Her first appearance at a FIFA tournament came in 2024, when she officiated four matches at the 2024 FIFA U-20 Women's World Cup, including the bronze medal match.

On 16 August 2026 she was at the Moulay El Hassan Stadium in Rabat where she officiated at the CAF Women's Africa Cup of Nations final between Malawi and Cameroon. Cameroon won the match 3:0.
