= Revital Amoyal =

Israeli footballer (born 1977)

Revital Amoyal רויטל אמויאל
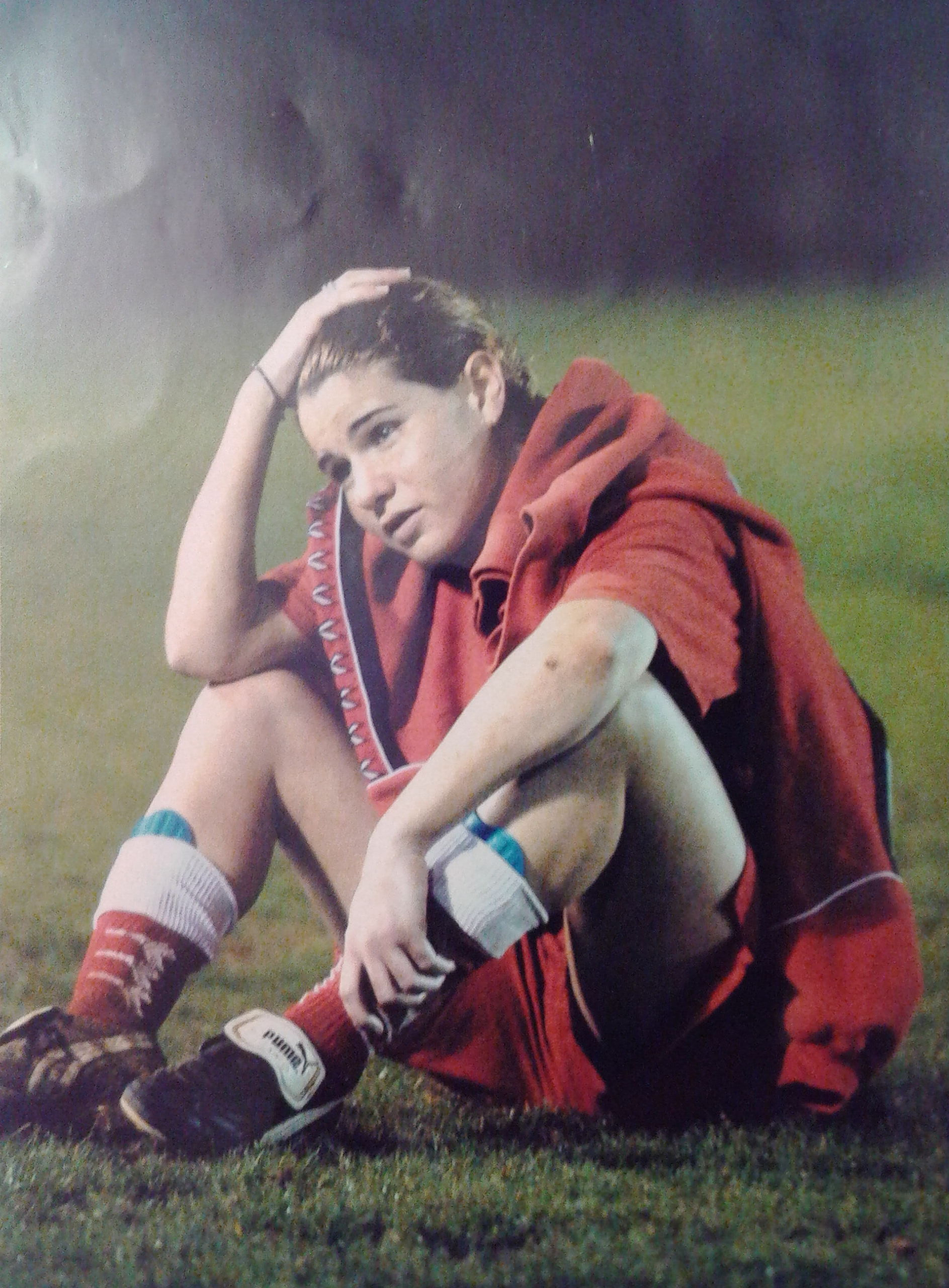

Personal information
- Date of birth: 10 October 1977 (age 49)
- Place of birth: Ashdod, Israel
- Position: Striker

Senior career*
Years	Team	Apps	(Gls)
1998–2002	Hapoel Tel Aviv		

International career
2001–2002	Israel	5	(0)
- * Club domestic league appearances and goals

Revital Amoyal (Hebrew: רויטל אמויאל; born 10 October 1977) is an Israeli former football striker.

== Club career ==
Born in Ashdod, Amoyal joined Ligat Nashim club Hapoel Tel Aviv upon its formation, and stayed with the club until retiring at the age of 25, in 2003. With Hapoel Tel Aviv, Amoyal won a domestic double in 2001–02, winning both the League and Cup. As the club qualified to the 2001–02 UEFA Women's Cup, Amoyal played in all three group stage matches with the club.

Amoyal made her debut with the National team on 2 September 2001, playing against Austria. Amoyal played five matches with the national team, the last on 6 June 2002, in a 2003 FIFA Women's World Cup qualification match against Croatia.

== Honours ==
- Championships (1):
  - 2000–01
- Cup (1):
  - 2000–01
