= 2024 South American Under-20 Women's Football Championship =

11th edition of the South American Under-20 Women's Football Championship

CONMEBOL Sub 20 Femenino 2024

Tournament details
- Host country: Ecuador
- Dates: 11 April – 5 May
- Teams: 10 (from 1 confederation)

Final positions
- Champions: Brazil (10th title)
- Runners-up: Paraguay
- Third place: Colombia
- Fourth place: Argentina

Tournament statistics
- Matches played: 35
- Goals scored: 96 (2.74 per match)
- Top scorer(s): (Paraguay) Fátima Acosta (Venezuela) Mariana Barreto (Colombia) Gabriela Rodríguez (7 goals each)

The 2024 South American Under-20 Women's Football Championship, officially the 2024 CONMEBOL Sub20 Femenina, was the 11th edition of the South American U-20 Women's Championship (CONMEBOL Sub20 Femenina), the biennial international youth football championship organised by CONMEBOL for the women's under-20 national teams of South America. It was held in Ecuador from 11 April to 5 May 2024.

The top four teams of the tournament qualified for the 2024 FIFA U-20 Women's World Cup in Colombia as the CONMEBOL representatives besides Colombia who automatically qualified as host. Colombia finished in the top four, the fifth in the final stage also qualified.

Brazil are the defending champions having won the title in 2022.

== Teams ==
All ten CONMEBOL member national teams are eligible to enter the tournament.

Team	Appearance	Previous best top-4 performance
Argentina	11th	Runners-up (2006, 2008, 2012)
Bolivia	11th	Fourth place (2004, 2014)
Brazil (holders)	11th	Champions (2004, 2006, 2008, 2010, 2012, 2014, 2015, 2018, 2022)
Chile	11th	Fourth place (2008, 2010)
Colombia	11th	Runners-up (2010, 2022)
Ecuador (host)	11th	Third place (2004)
Paraguay	11th	Runners-up (2004, 2014, 2018)
Peru	11th	Fourth place (2006)
Uruguay	11th	Third place (2022)
Venezuela	11th	Runners-up (2015)

== First stage ==
In the first stage, the teams are ranked according to points earned (3 points for a win, 1 point for a draw, 0 points for a loss). If tied on points, tiebreakers are applied in the following order (Regulations Article 20):

1. Head-to-head result in games between tied teams;
  1. Points in the matches played between the teams in question;
  2. Goal difference in the matches played between the teams in question;
  3. Number of goals scored in the matches played between the teams in question;
2. Goal difference in all group matches;
3. Number of goals scored in all group matches;
4. Fewest red cards received;
5. Fewest yellow cards received
6. Drawing of lots.

The top three teams of each group advance to the final stage.

The draw was held on 11 March 2024.

All match times were in ECT (UTC−5), as listed by CONMEBOL.

=== Group A ===
Pos	Team	Pld	W	D	L	GF	GA	GD	Pts	Qualification
1	Paraguay	4	3	1	0	5	2	+3	10	Final stage
2	Peru	4	2	1	1	6	4	+2	7	Final stage
3	Argentina	4	1	3	0	3	2	+1	6	Final stage
4	Ecuador (H)	4	1	1	2	3	5	−2	4	
5	Uruguay	4	0	0	4	3	7	−4	0	

Source: CONMEBOL
(H) Hosts
11 April 2024
16:00

Peru	1–1	Argentina
Gherson 41'	Report	Acuña 54'

Estadio Modelo Alberto Spencer Herrera, Guayaquil
Referee: Jenny Arias Parga (Colombia)
11 April 2024
18:30

Ecuador	0–1	Paraguay
	Report	Varela 74'

Estadio Modelo Alberto Spencer Herrera, Guayaquil
Referee: Deborah Cecilia Cruz Correia (Brazil)

13 April 2024
16:00

Paraguay	2–1	Uruguay
Acosta 78' (pen.), 87'	Report	Félix 19'

Estadio Modelo Alberto Spencer Herrera, Guayaquil
Referee: Dione Rissios (Chile)
13 April 2024
18:30

Peru	2–0	Ecuador
Ruíz 27'; Espinoza 82'	Report

Estadio Modelo Alberto Spencer Herrera, Guayaquil
Referee: Alejandra Quisbert (Bolivia)

15 April 2024
16:00

Paraguay	2–1	Peru
Varela 9'; Tamay 76'	Report	Porras 52'

Estadio Modelo Alberto Spencer Herrera, Guayaquil
Referee: Stefani Escobar (Venezuela)
15 April 2024
18:30

Uruguay	0–1	Argentina
	Report	Núñez 16'

Estadio Modelo Alberto Spencer Herrera, Guayaquil
Referee: Deborah Cecilia Cruz Correia (Brazil)

17 April 2024
16:00

Uruguay	1–2	Peru
Cola 90+1'	Report	Gherson 46'; Ruíz 84'

Estadio Modelo Alberto Spencer Herrera, Guayaquil
Referee: Alejandra Quisbert (Bolivia)
17 April 2024
18:30

Argentina	1–1	Ecuador
Romero 19'	Report	Macías 62'

Estadio Modelo Alberto Spencer Herrera, Guayaquil
Referee: Jenny Arias Parga (Colombia)

19 April 2024
16:00

Argentina	0–0	Paraguay
	Report

Estadio Modelo Alberto Spencer Herrera, Guayaquil
Referee: Dione Rissios (Chile)
19 April 2024
18:30

Ecuador	2–1	Uruguay
Rodríguez 10', 70' (pen.)	Report	Pereira 60'

Estadio Modelo Alberto Spencer Herrera, Guayaquil
Referee: Stefani Escobar (Venezuela)

=== Group B ===
Pos	Team	Pld	W	D	L	GF	GA	GD	Pts	Qualification
1	Colombia	4	4	0	0	11	2	+9	12	Final stage
2	Brazil	4	3	0	1	10	4	+6	9	Final stage
3	Venezuela	4	2	0	2	9	6	+3	6	Final stage
4	Chile	4	1	0	3	2	8	−6	3	
5	Bolivia	4	0	0	4	0	12	−12	0	

Source: CONMEBOL
12 April 2024
16:00

Bolivia	0–6	Venezuela
	Report	Barreto 4', 13', 37'; Jiménez 42'; Apóstol 53'; Graterol 78'

Estadio Modelo Alberto Spencer Herrera, Guayaquil
Referee: Roberta Echeverría (Argentina)
12 April 2024
18:30

Brazil	5–1	Chile
Natália Vendito 30'; Duda Mineira 53'; Ana Flávia 68'; Gisele Vale 80'; Carol 87'	Report	Carter 45+3'

Estadio Modelo Alberto Spencer Herrera, Guayaquil
Referee: Nadia Fuques Blanco (Uruguay)

14 April 2024
16:00

Chile	0–2	Colombia
	Report	Rodríguez 17', 20'

Estadio Modelo Alberto Spencer Herrera, Guayaquil
Referee: Gabriela Arce (Paraguay)
14 April 2024
18:30

Bolivia	0–2	Brazil
	Report	Gisele Vale 10'; Carol 16'

Estadio Modelo Alberto Spencer Herrera, Guayaquil
Referee: Olatz Rivera Olmedo (Spain)

16 April 2024
16:00

Chile	1–0	Bolivia
Álvarez 63'	Report

Estadio Modelo Alberto Spencer Herrera, Guayaquil
Referee: Elizabeth Tintaya (Peru)
16 April 2024
18:30

Colombia	4–1	Venezuela
Blanco 2' (o.g.); López 9'; Garavito 45+2'; Perlaza 61'	Report	Barreto 19'

Estadio Modelo Alberto Spencer Herrera, Guayaquil
Referee: Marcelly Zambrano (Ecuador)

18 April 2024
16:00

Colombia	3–0	Bolivia
Viancha 35'; Rodríguez 40', 61'	Report

Estadio Modelo Alberto Spencer Herrera, Guayaquil
Referee: Olatz Rivera Olmedo (Spain)
18 April 2024
18:30

Venezuela	1–2	Brazil
Graterol 57'	Report	Natália Vendito 34'; Ana Flávia 45+2' (pen.)

Estadio Modelo Alberto Spencer Herrera, Guayaquil
Referee: Roberta Echeverría (Argentina)

20 April 2024
16:00

Venezuela	1–0	Chile
Barreto 80'	Report

Estadio Modelo Alberto Spencer Herrera, Guayaquil
Referee: Nadia Fuques Blanco (Uruguay)
20 April 2024
18:30

Brazil	1–2	Colombia
Dos Santos 85'	Report	Ortegón 69'; Rodríguez 74'

Estadio Modelo Alberto Spencer Herrera, Guayaquil
Referee: Marcelly Zambrano (Ecuador)

== Final stage ==
If teams finished level on points, the final rankings would be determined according to the same criteria as the first stage, taking into account only matches in the final stage.

All match times are in ECT (UTC−5), as listed by CONMEBOL.

Pos	Team	Pld	W	D	L	GF	GA	GD	Pts	Qualification
1	Brazil (C)	5	5	0	0	10	0	+10	15	2024 FIFA U-20 Women's World Cup (Note: As Colombia will finish in the top four while already having qualified to the World Cup as hosts, the fifth place finisher will qualify as well.)
2	Paraguay	5	2	2	1	7	6	+1	8	2024 FIFA U-20 Women's World Cup
3	Colombia	5	2	2	1	6	5	+1	8	2024 FIFA U-20 Women's World Cup
4	Argentina	5	1	2	2	8	7	+1	5	2024 FIFA U-20 Women's World Cup
5	Venezuela	5	1	1	3	10	10	0	4	2024 FIFA U-20 Women's World Cup
6	Peru	5	0	1	4	3	16	−13	1	

Source: CONMEBOL
Rules for classification: Tiebreakers
(C) Champions
Notes:
23 April 2024
15:00

Argentina	0–2	Brazil
	Report	Gi Fernandes 4'; Ana Flávia 45+3'

Estadio Modelo Alberto Spencer Herrera, Guayaquil
Referee: Jenny Arias Parga (Colombia)
23 April 2024
17:30

Paraguay	2–0	Venezuela
De León 61'; Acosta 81'	Report

Estadio Modelo Alberto Spencer Herrera, Guayaquil
Referee: Olatz Rivera Olmedo (Spain)
23 April 2024
20:00

Colombia	1–0	Peru
Álvarez 82' (pen.)	Report

Estadio Modelo Alberto Spencer Herrera, Guayaquil
Referee: Alejandra Quisbert (Bolivia)

26 April 2024
15:00

Colombia	3–2	Venezuela
Álvarez 3'; González 40'; Rodríguez 90+4'	Report	Jiménez 51'; Apóstol 82'

Estadio Modelo Alberto Spencer Herrera, Guayaquil
Referee: Marcelly Zambrano (Ecuador)
26 April 2024
17:30

Paraguay	0–3	Brazil
	Report	Vi Amaral 17'; Duda Mineira 21'; Guima 45+1'

Estadio Modelo Alberto Spencer Herrera, Guayaquil
Referee: Dione Rissios (Chile)
26 April 2024
20:00

Peru	0–5	Argentina
	Report	Núñez 27'; Calvo 40'; Nigito 72'; Altgelt 77'; Giménez 90+3'

Estadio Modelo Alberto Spencer Herrera, Guayaquil

29 April 2024
15:00

Peru	1–6	Venezuela
León 30'	Report	Apóstol 22', 90+5'; Barreto 48', 71'; Jiménez 60', 78'

Estadio Modelo Alberto Spencer Herrera, Guayaquil
29 April 2024
17:30

Brazil	1–0	Colombia
Rebeca 35'	Report

Estadio Modelo Alberto Spencer Herrera, Guayaquil
29 April 2024
20:00

Argentina	0–2	Paraguay
	Report	Acosta 32', 90+3'

Estadio Modelo Alberto Spencer Herrera, Guayaquil

2 May 2024
15:00

Peru	2–2	Paraguay
Ruiz 21'; Garcia 31'		Acosta 14'; Fernández 76'

Estadio Modelo Alberto Spencer Herrera, Guayaquil
2 May 2024
17:30

Colombia	1–1	Argentina
Rodríguez 26'		Acuña 62'

Estadio Modelo Alberto Spencer Herrera, Guayaquil
2 May 2024
20:00

Venezuela	0–2	Brazil
		Milena 52'; Carol 90'

Estadio Modelo Alberto Spencer Herrera, Guayaquil

5 May 2024
15:00

Paraguay	1–1	Colombia
Acosta 81'		Perlaza 90+2'

Estadio Modelo Alberto Spencer Herrera, Guayaquil
5 May 2024
17:30

Venezuela	2–2	Argentina
Graterol 5'; Jiménez 59'		Acuña 41'; Núñez 57'

Estadio Modelo Alberto Spencer Herrera, Guayaquil
5 May 2024
20:00

Brazil	2–0	Peru
Gutierrez 18' (o.g.); Vi Amaral 28'

Estadio Modelo Alberto Spencer Herrera, Guayaquil

== Goalscorers ==
There have been 57 goals scored in 23 matches, for an average of 2.48 goals per match (as of 23 April 2024).

7 goals

- (Paraguay) Fátima Acosta
- (Venezuela) Mariana Barreto
- (Colombia) Gabriela Rodríguez

4 goals

- (Venezuela) Floriangel Apóstol
- (Venezuela) Marianyela Jiménez

3 goals

- (Brazil) Ana Flávia
- (Brazil) Carol

2 goals

- (Argentina) Kishi Núñez
- (Brazil) Duda Mineira
- (Brazil) Gisele Vale
- (Brazil) Natália Vendito
- (Brazil) Vi Amaral
- (Colombia) Maryl Álvarez
- (Ecuador) Lía Rodríguez
- (Paraguay) Agustina Varela
- (Peru) Birka Ruíz
- (Peru) Valerie Gherson
- (Venezuela) Francelis Graterol

1 goal

- (Argentina) Anela Nigito
- (Argentina) Francisca Altgelt
- (Argentina) Julieta Romero
- (Argentina) Margarita Giménez
- (Argentina) Morena Calvo
- (Argentina) Verónica Acuña
- (Brazil) Gi Fernandes
- (Brazil) Guima
- (Brazil) Milena
- (Brazil) Pamela Dos Santos
- (Brazil) Rebeca
- (Chile) Anaís Álvarez
- (Chile) Nicole Carter
- (Colombia) Ana Milé González
- (Colombia) Juana Ortegón
- (Colombia) Karla Viancha
- (Colombia) Laura Garavito
- (Colombia) Maithé López
- (Colombia) Stefanía Perlaza
- (Ecuador) Sheyla Macías
- (Paraguay) María Tamay
- (Paraguay) Naomi de León
- (Paraguay) Fiorella Fernández
- (Peru) Linda Espinoza
- (Peru) Mia Léon
- (Peru) Sashenka Porras
- (Uruguay) Anna Cola
- (Uruguay) Josefina Félix
- (Uruguay) Valentina Pereira

2 own goals

- (Peru) Taylor Gutierrez (against Brazil)
- (Venezuela) Zoraida Blanco (against Colombia)

== Qualified teams for FIFA U-20 Women's World Cup ==
The following four teams from CONMEBOL qualify for the 2024 FIFA U-20 Women's World Cup alongside hosts Colombia.

Team	Qualified on	Previous appearances in tournament^{1}
Colombia	23 June 2023	2 (2010, 2022)
Brazil	29 April 2024	10 (2002, 2004, 2006, 2008, 2010, 2012, 2014, 2016, 2018, 2022)
Paraguay	2 May 2024	2 (2014, 2018)
Argentina	2 May 2024	3 (2006, 2008, 2012)
Venezuela	5 May 2024	1 (2016)

^{1} Bold indicates champions for that year. Italic indicates hosts for that year.
