= Hapoel Ashkelon F.C. (women) =

Hapoel Ashkelon
- Full name: Hapoel Ashkelon Women's Football Club הפועל אשקלון
- Founded: 1998
- Dissolved: 2002
- League: Ligat Nashim
- 2001–01: 14th

Hapoel Ashkelon (Hebrew: הפועל אשקלון) was an Israeli women's football club from Ashkelon, who competed in the Israeli Women's Football League and the Israeli Women's Cup.

== History ==
The club was among the first established in Israel and joined Ligat Nashim in the league's first season, Where it played for the next four seasons. In 2000–01, the club advanced to the Women's Cup semi-finals, losing to eventual cup winner, Hapoel Tel Aviv 2–7.

At the end of the season, after the club finished bottom of the league, the club folded.
