= Maria Sole Ferrieri Caputi =

Italian football referee (born 1990)

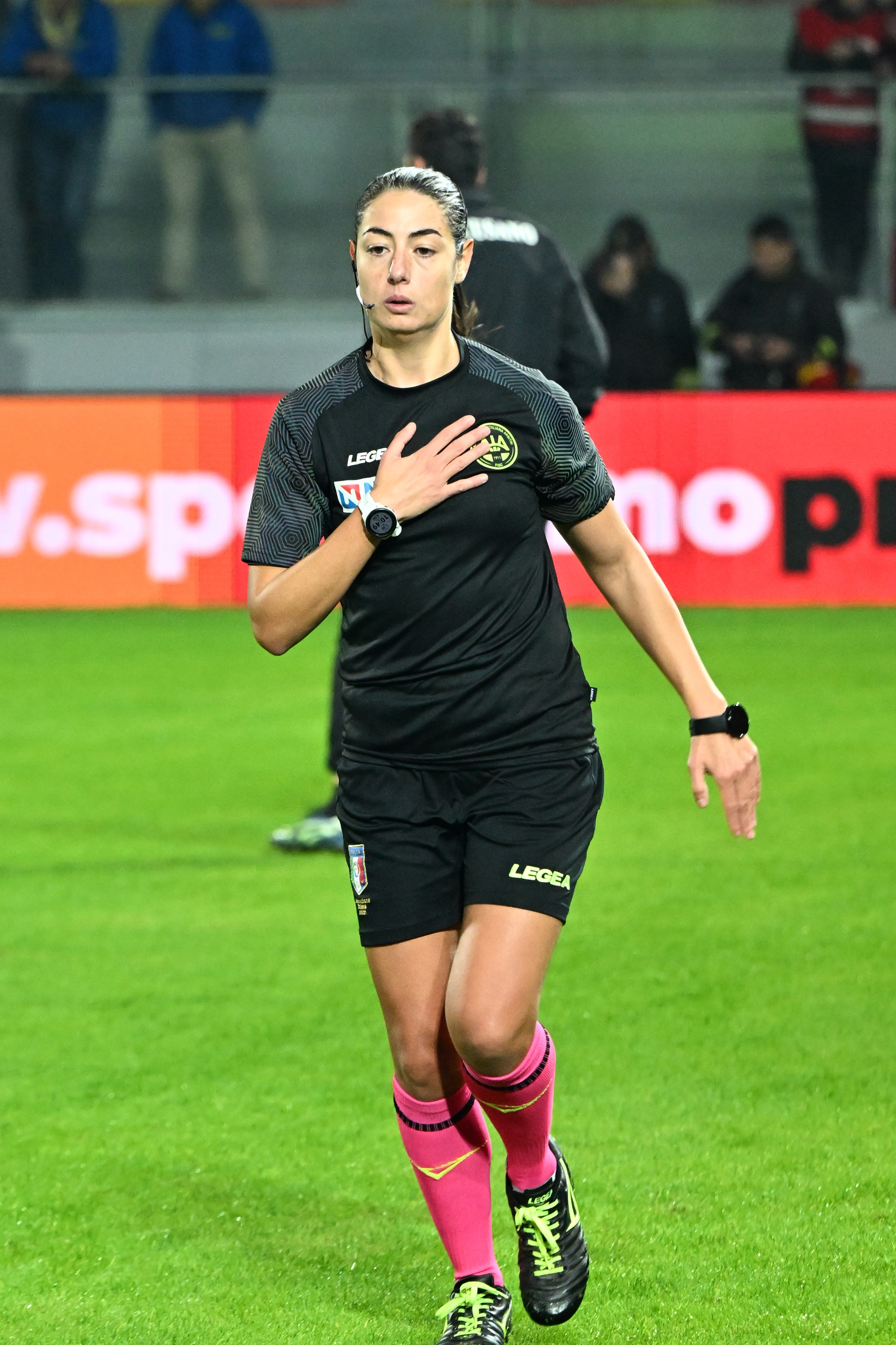
- Maria Sole Ferrieri Caputi at Benito Stirpe Stadium, Frosinone
- Born: 20 November 1990 (age 35); Livorno, Italy
- Other occupation: University researcher

Domestic
| Years | League | Role |
| 2007– | FIGC | Referee |
| 2015–2020 | Serie D | Referee |
| 2020–2022 | Serie C | Referee |
| 2021– | Serie B | Referee |
| 2022– | Serie A | Referee |

International
| Years | League | Role |
| 2019– | UEFA Listed | Referee |
| 2023– | FIFA Listed | Referee |

Maria Sole Ferrieri Caputi (born 20 November 1990) is an Italian football referee.

== Career ==
Affiliated to the section of her native city, Livorno, Ferrieri Caputi entered AIA in 2007. In November 2015, she refereed the Levito–Atletico San Paolo Serie D match.

In 2019, she refereed the Torneo di Viareggio tournament and became an international referee. She made her international debut in Scotland–Cyprus, valid for the UEFA Women's Euro 2022 qualifiers.

In 2020, she was promoted to Serie C after five years in Serie D, followed by the VAR room designation for Serie B. On 8 December of that year, she debuted in a match involving Pro Patria and Pro Sesto.

In October 2021, she made her Serie B debut in Cittadella–SPAL. On 15 December of that year, she refereed the Cagliari–Cittadella Coppa Italia match, giving three yellow cards and disallowing three goals, becoming the first female to referee a Serie A team of men's football. On 8 January 2022, she refereed the final of the 2021–22 Women's Supercoppa Italiana, Milan–Juventus 1–2.

On 1 July, she was promoted to Serie A. She was fourth official in Monza–Udinese on Matchday 3. Having already refereed two Coppa Italia and two Serie B matches, on 28 September she was designated to referee Sassuolo–Salernitana, which was played four days later, becoming the first woman to referee a Serie A match.

In early January 2023, she was included in the list of the match officials that were selected for the 2023 FIFA Women's World Cup in Australia and New Zealand; On 17 January, she refereed the Coppa Italia match between Napoli and Cremonese and was part to the first all-female refereeing triad in Italian men's football, with assistants Francesca Di Monte and Tiziana Trasciatti.

In late March, she refereed the match between the Germany–Peru friendly, won by the former 2–0, thus becoming the first Italian woman to referee an international match in men's football.

In late May, she was chosen as AVAR 2 (Assistant Video Assistant Referee 2) for the 2023 UEFA Women's Champions League final.

On the following 14 December, she officiated the Women's Champions League group stage match between Paris Saint-Germain and Real Madrid, with Di Monte and Trasciatti as assistants and Maria Marotta as fourth official.

She took charge of the 2024 FIFA U-20 Women's World Cup final.

Ferrieri Caputi officiated the 2025 Saudi Women's Cup final. She served as fourth official in the UEFA Women's Euro 2025 final. In December 2025, the IFFHS elected her as the best female referee of the year.

On 1 November 2026, while refereeing a Serie A match between Como and Venezia, she ruled out a penalty in favour of the latter on VAR revision. In the aftermath of the game, she received sexist insults on social media that were condemned by Como.

== Personal life ==
Ferrieri Caputi was born in Livorno, Italy to parents of Apulian origin. She revealed that her love for football started when her father took her to the Stadio Armando Picchi, in Livorno and that she decided to become a referee after seeing a flyer at the exit of her school.

She has a bachelor's degree in Political Science and International Relations from the University of Pisa and a master's degree in Sociology from the University of Florence. She is a researcher at the Adapt Foundation (Association for International and Comparative Studies on Labour Law and Industrial Relations) and a doctoral candidate at the University of Bergamo.

On 1 April 2023, Lega Serie A published a documentary on its YouTube channel, titled Un giorno di Sole (A sunny day), on Ferrieri Caputi's refereeing career.

== Honours ==
- IFFHS World's Best Woman Referee: 2025
