= Amina Hassan =

Pakistani politician

Member of the Provincial Assembly of the Punjab
- Incumbent
- Assumed office 27 February 2024
- Constituency: Reserved Seats for woman

Personal details
- Born: Amina Hassan
- Party: PMLN (2024-present)

Amina Hassan Sheikh (Urdu: آمنہ حسن شیخ; is a Pakistani politician who has been a Member of the Provincial Assembly of the Punjab since 2024.

== Early life and education ==
Hassan was born on 28 August 1991 in Rawalpindi, Pakistan.

She has done Master of Law (LLM).

== Political career ==
In the 2024 Pakistani general election, she secured a seat in the Provincial Assembly of the Punjab through a reserved quota for women as a candidate of Pakistan Muslim League (N) (PML-N).
