= Aemu Oyama =

Japanese footballer (born 2004)

Aemu Oyama 大山 愛笑
Personal information
- Date of birth: 19 September 2004 (age 22)
- Place of birth: Ōta, Tokyo, Japan
- Height: 1.58 m (5 ft 2 in)
- Position: Defensive midfielder

Team information
- Current team: HB Køge
- Number: 6

Youth career
- Tokyo Verdy Beleza

College career
Years	Team	Apps	(Gls)
2023–2024	Waseda University		

Senior career*
Years	Team	Apps	(Gls)
2019–2023	Tokyo Verdy Beleza	8	(1)
2025–2026	Manchester City	2	(0)
2025–2026	→ FC Rosengård (loan)	6	(1)
2026–	HB Køge	0	(0)

International career^{‡}
2019	Japan U16	4	(1)
2022–	Japan U20	21	(1)
Medal record
Women's football
Representing Japan
FIFA U-20 Women's World Cup
Runner-up	Costa Rica 2022
Runner-up	Colombia 2024
- * Club domestic league appearances and goals as of 16 September 2025 ‡ National team caps and goals as of 22 September 2024

Aemu Oyama (大山 愛笑, Ōyama Aemu; IPA: [oːjama a.emɯ]; born 19 September 2004) is a Japanese professional footballer who plays as a defensive midfielder for A-Liga club HB Køge and the Japan national under-20s team.

== Club career ==
On 16 October 2021, Oyama made her WE League debut for Tokyo Verdy Beleza. She later became the youngest ever scorer in the division's history at age 17.

In March 2022, Oyama was ranked as one of the Top 20 international youth talents by Goal.com.

On 18 January 2025, Oyama signed a two and a half year contract with Women's Super League club Manchester City. She made 2 league appearances before moving to FC Rosengård on a six-month loan in August 2025.

On 18 August 2026, Manchester City confirmed that Oyama had joined A-Liga champions HB Køge on a permanent contract.

== International career ==
Oyama has represented Japan at under-16 and under-20 youth level.

== Personal life ==
Oyama gained a degree in Sports Science from Waseda University in Tokyo.

== Career statistics ==
=== Club ===
As of match played 16 February 2025

Appearances and goals by club, season and competition
Club	Season	League			National cup (Note: Includes Empress's Cup, Women's FA Cup)		League cup (Note: Includes Nadeshiko League Cup, WE League Cup, Women's League Cup)		Continental (Note: Includes UEFA Women's Champions League)		Total	
Club	Season	Division	Apps	Goals	Apps	Goals	Apps	Goals	Apps	Goals	Apps	Goals
Tokyo Verdy Beleza	2019	Nadeshiko League	2	0	0	0	6	0	—		8	0
Tokyo Verdy Beleza	2020	Nadeshiko League	0	0	0	0	0	0	—		0	0
Tokyo Verdy Beleza	2021–22	WE League	6	1	0	0	0	0	—		6	1
Tokyo Verdy Beleza	2022–23	WE League	0	0	0	0	0	0	—		0	0
Tokyo Verdy Beleza	Total		8	1	0	0	6	0	0	0	14	1
Manchester City	2024–25	Women's Super League	2	0	0	0	0	0	0	0	2	0
Career total			10	1	0	0	6	0	0	0	16	1

== Honours ==
Japan U16

- AFC U-16 Women's Championship: 2019

Japan U20

- FIFA U-20 Women's World Cup: 2022 and 2024 runner-up
- AFC U-20 Women's Asian Cup: 2024 runner-up
