= Alejandra Lomelí =

Mexican footballer (born 2004)

Personal information
- Full name: Alejandra Lomelí Franco
- Date of birth: 30 June 2004 (age 22)
- Place of birth: Tepatitlán, Jalisco, Mexico
- Height: 1.52 m (5 ft 0 in)
- Position: Winger

Team information
- Current team: Cruz Azul
- Number: 8

Senior career*
Years	Team	Apps	(Gls)
2020–2025	Atlas	105	(10)
2025–	Cruz Azul	21	(2)

International career^{‡}
2023–2024	Mexico U-20		
- * Club domestic league appearances and goals as of 1 February 2026 ‡ National team caps and goals as of 12 March 2022

Alejandra Lomelí Franco (born 30 June 2004) is a Mexican professional footballer who plays as a Forward for Liga Femenil club Cruz Azul.

== Career ==
In 2020, she started her career in Atlas.

== International career ==
Since 2023, Lomelí has been part of the Mexico U-20 team.
