= 2024 FIFA U-20 Women's World Cup =

Copa Mundial Femenina Sub-20 de la FIFA Colombia 2024
- Future Stars of Football

Tournament details
- Host country: Colombia
- Dates: 31 August – 22 September
- Teams: 24 (from 6 confederations)
- Venues: 4 (in 3 host cities)

Final positions
- Champions: North Korea (3rd title)
- Runners-up: Japan
- Third place: United States
- Fourth place: Netherlands

Tournament statistics
- Matches played: 52
- Goals scored: 187 (3.6 per match)
- Attendance: 375,841 (7,228 per match)
- Top scorer: (North Korea) Choe Il-son (6 goals)
- Best player: (North Korea) Choe Il-son
- Best goalkeeper: (Netherlands) Femke Liefting
- Fair play award: Japan

The 2024 FIFA U-20 Women's World Cup (Spanish: Copa Mundial Femenina Sub-20 de la FIFA Colombia 2024) was the 11th edition of the FIFA U-20 Women's World Cup, the biennial international women's youth football championship contested by the under-20 women's national teams of the member associations of FIFA. The tournament was expanded by FIFA to feature 24 teams instead of 16.

The tournament was hosted by Colombia from 31 August to 22 September 2024. It was the third time that Colombia hosted a FIFA tournament, after the 2011 FIFA U-20 World Cup and the 2016 FIFA Futsal World Cup. This was also the first time that Colombia hosted a FIFA women's tournament.

Spain were the defending champions. In addition, Spain held all three Women's World Cups (senior, U-20 and U-17) at the time of the tournament. They were eliminated in the quarter-finals by Japan, whom they faced in the two previous finals.

North Korea won a joint-record third title, defeating Japan in the final.

== Host selection ==
Colombia were announced as the 2024 Women's U-20 World Cup hosts following the FIFA Council meeting on 25 June 2023 in Zürich, Switzerland.

== Expansion ==
On 4 October 2023, FIFA decided the expansion of the tournament from 16 to 24 teams. The slot allocation mirrored the men's tournament and was as follows:

- AFC (Asia): 4 slots
- CAF (Africa): 4 slots
- CONCACAF (North America (Note: Comprising Northern America, Central America, and the Caribbean)): 4 slots
- CONMEBOL (South America): 5 slots (including hosts Colombia)
- OFC (Oceania): 2 slots
- UEFA (Europe): 5 slots

== Qualified teams ==
A total of 24 teams qualified for the final tournament. In addition to Colombia who qualified automatically as hosts, the other 23 teams qualified from six separate continental competitions. All the teams that qualified from the last edition also qualified to this edition.

North Korea made a return after missing out in the 2022 edition. The rest of the three teams who made their return were from CONMEBOL. Argentina made a return after 12 years, Paraguay made a six-year return after they last qualified in 2018, and Venezuela made an eight-year return after qualifying in Papua New Guinea. Cameroon, Morocco, Austria, and Fiji made their debut. This was the first time that Austria and Fiji made their FIFA debut for any level in the women's federation.

Confederation	Qualifying tournament	Team	Appearance			Previous best performance
Confederation	Qualifying tournament	Team	Total	First	Last	Previous best performance
AFC (Asia) (4 teams)	2024 AFC U-20 Women's Asian Cup	Australia	5th	2002	2022	Quarter-finalists (2002, 2004)
AFC (Asia) (4 teams)	2024 AFC U-20 Women's Asian Cup	Japan	8th	2002	2022	Champions (2018)
AFC (Asia) (4 teams)	2024 AFC U-20 Women's Asian Cup	North Korea	8th	2006	2018	Champions (2006, 2016)
AFC (Asia) (4 teams)	2024 AFC U-20 Women's Asian Cup	South Korea	7th	2004	2022	Third place (2010)
CAF (Africa) (4 teams)	2024 African U-20 Women's World Cup qualification	Cameroon	1st	Debut		None
CAF (Africa) (4 teams)	2024 African U-20 Women's World Cup qualification	Ghana	7th	2010	2022	Group stage (2010, 2012, 2014, 2016, 2018, 2022)
CAF (Africa) (4 teams)	2024 African U-20 Women's World Cup qualification	Morocco	1st	Debut		None
CAF (Africa) (4 teams)	2024 African U-20 Women's World Cup qualification	Nigeria	11th	2002	2022	Runners-up (2010, 2014)
CONCACAF (North America) (4 teams)	2023 CONCACAF Women's U-20 Championship	Canada	9th	2002	2022	Runners-up (2002)
CONCACAF (North America) (4 teams)	2023 CONCACAF Women's U-20 Championship	Costa Rica (Note: After the announcement of the expansion of the 2024 FIFA U-20 Women's World Cup to 24 teams, Costa Rica took the new fourth spot as CONCACAF representative as they ended fourth in the qualifying tournament.)	4th	2010	2022	Group stage (2010, 2014, 2022)
CONCACAF (North America) (4 teams)	2023 CONCACAF Women's U-20 Championship	Mexico	10th	2002	2022	Quarter-finalists (2010, 2012, 2016, 2022)
CONCACAF (North America) (4 teams)	2023 CONCACAF Women's U-20 Championship	United States	11th	2002	2022	Champions (2002, 2008, 2012)
CONMEBOL (South America) (Hosts + 4 teams)	Host nation	Colombia	3rd	2010	2022	Fourth place (2010)
CONMEBOL (South America) (Hosts + 4 teams)	2024 South American U-20 Women's Championship	Argentina	4th	2006	2012	Group stage (2006, 2008, 2012)
CONMEBOL (South America) (Hosts + 4 teams)	2024 South American U-20 Women's Championship	Brazil	11th	2002	2022	Third place (2006, 2022)
CONMEBOL (South America) (Hosts + 4 teams)	2024 South American U-20 Women's Championship	Paraguay	3rd	2014	2018	Group stage (2014, 2018)
CONMEBOL (South America) (Hosts + 4 teams)	2024 South American U-20 Women's Championship	Venezuela	2nd	2016	2016	Group stage (2016)
OFC (Oceania) (2 teams)	2023 OFC U-19 Women's Championship	Fiji (Note: After the announcement of the expansion of the 2024 FIFA U-20 Women's World Cup to 24 teams, Fiji took the new second spot as OFC representative as they ended second in the qualifying tournament.)	1st	Debut		None
OFC (Oceania) (2 teams)	2023 OFC U-19 Women's Championship	New Zealand	9th	2006	2022	Quarter-finalists (2014)
UEFA (Europe) (5 teams)	2023 UEFA Women's U-19 Championship	Austria (Note: After the announcement of the expansion of the 2024 FIFA U-20 Women's World Cup to 24 teams, UEFA decided to organize a play-off between Austria and Iceland, the group stage third-placed teams, on 4 December 2023. The fifth place play-off winners would qualify for the 2024 FIFA U-20 Women's World Cup.)	1st	Debut		None
UEFA (Europe) (5 teams)	2023 UEFA Women's U-19 Championship	France	9th	2002	2022	Runners-up (2016)
UEFA (Europe) (5 teams)	2023 UEFA Women's U-19 Championship	Germany	11th	2002	2022	Champions (2004, 2010, 2014)
UEFA (Europe) (5 teams)	2023 UEFA Women's U-19 Championship	Netherlands	3rd	2018	2022	Fourth place (2022)
UEFA (Europe) (5 teams)	2023 UEFA Women's U-19 Championship	Spain	5th	2004	2022	Champions (2022)

== Venues ==
Bogotá, Cali, and Medellín were the three cities chosen to host the competition on 20 February 2024.

For this tournament, the Estadio Metropolitano de Techo was officially called "Estadio El Techo" by FIFA. The original name is shown in parentheses.

Location of the host cities of the FIFA U-20 Women's World Cup Colombia 2024.

- 1 Bogotá
- 2 Medellín
- 3 Cali

2024 FIFA U-20 Women's World Cup venues
Bogotá
Estadio El Campín	Estadio El Techo (Estadio Metropolitano de Techo)
Capacity: 39,512	Capacity: 10,000
Medellín	Cali
Estadio Atanasio Girardot	Estadio Pascual Guerrero
Capacity: 44,826	Capacity: 37,000

== Draw ==
The official draw took place on 5 June 2024 at the Hall 74 in Bogotá. The teams were allocated based on their performances in the 5 previous U-20 Women's World Cups, with five bonus points added to the qualifying tournament winners (for this cycle). The host team, Colombia, was automatically seeded and assigned to position A1. During the draw process, teams from the same confederation could not be placed in the same group for the group stage.

Pot 1	Pot 2	Pot 3	Pot 4
Colombia ^{H} Spain; Japan; France; North Korea; Germany	Nigeria; Brazil; Mexico; United States; Netherlands; New Zealand	South Korea; Ghana; Canada; Australia; Paraguay; Argentina	Venezuela; Austria; Cameroon; Morocco; Costa Rica; Fiji

== Squads ==
Players born between 1 January 2004 and 31 December 2008 were eligible to compete in the tournament.

== Match officials ==
For the very first time in a football pitch national teams tournament, the football video support (FVS) was implemented. This new alternative simplified the video assistant referee (VAR).

FVS system did not utilize video match officials. The head coach of each team was allowed to make a video review request. The number of requests during the match were limited to two for the regulation time with an additional challenge added in extra time. Should the coach failed in all of the remaining requests, they would not be allowed to request another review.

A total of 18 referees, 36 assistant and 4 support referees were appointed officially by FIFA for the tournament on 19 June 2024.

Originally, Susanne Küng (Switzerland) and Andreia Ferreira (Portugal) were selected for the tournament, and latter replaced by their compatriots Linda Schmid and Vanessa Gomes, respectively.

The VAR system was implemented only for the third place match and the final. Both referees designated as video assistant for the two final matches are shown in italic.

Confederation	Referees	Assistant referees
AFC	(Chinese Football Association) Dong Fangyu (Kyrgyz Football Union) Veronika Bernatskaia (Korea Football Association) Oh Hyeon-jeong	(Chinese Football Association) Bao Mengxiao (Chinese Football Association) Xie Lijun (Kyrgyz Football Union) Ramina Tsoi (Korea Football Association) Kim Kyoung-min (Football Association of Thailand) Nuannid Donjangreed (Football Association of Thailand) Supawan Hinthong
CAF	(Ivorian Football Federation) Akissi Konan (Egyptian Football Association) Shahenda El Maghrabi	(Algerian Football Federation) Asma Feriel Ouahab (Football Federation of Burundi) Fidès Bangurambona (Cameroonian Football Federation) Carine Atezambong (Royal Moroccan Football Federation) Soukaina Hamdi
CONCACAF	(National Football Federation of Guatemala) Astrid Gramajo (Mexican Football Federation) Karen Hernández (Trinidad and Tobago Football Association) Crystal Sobers (United States Soccer Federation) Natalie Simon	(National Football Federation of Guatemala) Sherly Socop (National Football Federation of Guatemala) Iris Vail (Mexican Football Federation) Elva Gutiérrez (Mexican Football Federation) Jéssica Morales (Trinidad and Tobago Football Association) Carissa Douglas-Jacob (Trinidad and Tobago Football Association) Melissa Nicholas (United States Soccer Federation) Meghan Mullen (United States Soccer Federation) Kali Smith
CONMEBOL	(Football Federation of Chile) Dione Rissios (Colombian Football Federation) María Victoria Daza (Ecuadorian Football Federation) Marcelly Zambrano (Uruguayan Football Association) Anahí Fernández	(Football Federation of Chile) Marcia Castillo (Football Federation of Chile) Leslie Vásquez (Colombian Football Federation) Eliana Ortiz (Colombian Football Federation) Mayra Sánchez (Ecuadorian Football Federation) Stefanía Paguay (Ecuadorian Football Federation) Viviana Segura (Uruguayan Football Association) Belén Clavijo (Uruguayan Football Association) Daiana Fernández
UEFA	(Croatian Football Federation) Ivana Martinčić (Italian Football Federation) Maria Sole Ferrieri (Football Federation of Macedonia) Ivana Projkovska (Romanian Football Federation) Iuliana Demetrescu (Royal Spanish Football Federation) Marta Huerta de Aza	(Austrian Football Association) Amina Gutschi (Croatian Football Federation) Maja Petravić (French Football Federation) Camille Soriano (Italian Football Federation) Tiziana Trasciatti (Portuguese Football Federation) Vanessa Gomes (Football Association of Slovenia) Staša Špur (Royal Spanish Football Federation) Eliana Fernández (Royal Spanish Football Federation) Guadalupe Porras (Swiss Football Association) Linda Schmid (Ukrainian Association of Football) Svitlana Grushko

Support referees
AFC	(Football Australia) Casey Reibelt
CAF	(Togolese Football Federation) Vincentia Amedome
CONCACAF	(Mexican Football Federation) Lizzet García
CONMEBOL	(Ecuadorian Football Federation) Susana Corella

== Group stage ==
The draw for the group stage took place on 5 June 2024.

All times are local, COT (UTC−5).

Tie-breaking criteria for group play
The ranking of teams in the group stage was determined as follows:
1. Points obtained in all group matches;
2. Goal difference in all group matches;
3. Number of goals scored in all group matches;
4. Points obtained in the matches played between the teams in question;
5. Goal difference in the matches played between the teams in question;
6. Number of goals scored in the matches played between the teams in question;
7. Fair play points in all group matches (only one deduction could be applied to a player in a single match):
  - Yellow card: −1 points;
  - Indirect red card (second yellow card): −3 points;
  - Direct red card: −4 points;
  - Yellow card and direct red card: −5 points;
8. Drawing of lots.

=== Group A ===
Pos	Team	Pld	W	D	L	GF	GA	GD	Pts	Qualification
1	Colombia (H)	3	3	0	0	4	0	+4	9	Knockout stage
2	Mexico	3	1	1	1	4	3	+1	4 (Note: Fair play points: Mexico –2, Cameroon –6.)	Knockout stage
3	Cameroon	3	1	1	1	4	3	+1	4	Knockout stage
4	Australia	3	0	0	3	0	6	−6	0	

Source: FIFA
Rules for classification: Group stage tiebreakers
(H) Hosts
Notes:
31 August 2024
15:00

Cameroon	2–2	Mexico
Eto 52', 85'	Report	García 3'; Saldívar 40'

Estadio El Campín, Bogotá
Attendance: 18,110
Referee: Marta Huerta de Aza (Spain)
31 August 2024
18:00

Colombia	2–0	Australia
Y. López 58'; Caicedo 76'	Report

Estadio El Campín, Bogotá
Attendance: 32,127
Referee: Ivana Martinčić (Croatia)

3 September 2024
17:00

Mexico	2–0	Australia
Servín 57'; Lomelí 90+1'	Report

Estadio El Campín, Bogotá
Attendance: 15,415
Referee: Marcelly Zambrano (Ecuador)
3 September 2024
20:00

Colombia	1–0	Cameroon
Muñoz 68'	Report

Estadio El Campín, Bogotá
Attendance: 30,644
Referee: Maria Sole Ferrieri (Italy)

6 September 2024
17:00

Mexico	0–1	Colombia
	Report	Espitaleta 38'

Estadio Atanasio Girardot, Medellín
Attendance: 35,837
Referee: Iuliana Demetrescu (Romania)
6 September 2024
17:00

Australia	0–2	Cameroon
	Report	Toko Njoya 45+4'; Eto 61'

Estadio El Campín, Bogotá
Attendance: 3,035
Referee: Natalie Simon (United States)

=== Group B ===
Pos	Team	Pld	W	D	L	GF	GA	GD	Pts	Qualification
1	Brazil	3	3	0	0	14	0	+14	9	Knockout stage
2	France	3	1	1	1	14	6	+8	4	Knockout stage
3	Canada	3	1	1	1	12	5	+7	4	Knockout stage
4	Fiji	3	0	0	3	0	29	−29	0	

Source: FIFA
Rules for classification: Group stage tiebreakers
31 August 2024
15:00

France	3–3	Canada
Scannapiéco 8', 49'; Diaz 67'	Report	Rose 4'; Markesini 22'; Chukwu 84'

Estadio Atanasio Girardot, Medellín
Attendance: 4,548
Referee: Dong Fangyu (China)
31 August 2024
18:00

Brazil	9–0	Fiji
Lara 4'; Vitória Amaral 9', 24'; Vendito 27', 28'; Priscila 49' (pen.); Milena 77'; Fernanda 82'; Gisele 86'	Report

Estadio Atanasio Girardot, Medellín
Attendance: 3,424
Referee: Crystal Sobers (Trinidad & Tobago)

3 September 2024
17:00

France	0–3	Brazil
	Report	Vendito 7', 19'; Priscila 75'

Estadio Atanasio Girardot, Medellín
Attendance: 4,884
Referee: Oh Hyeon-jeong (South Korea)
3 September 2024
20:00

Fiji	0–9	Canada
	Report	Smith 7', 28'; Chukwu 24', 34', 41'; Briggs 32', 35'; Ottey 54'; McBride 67'

Estadio Atanasio Girardot, Medellín
Attendance: 697
Referee: Shahenda El Maghrabi (Egypt)

6 September 2024
20:00

Fiji	0–11	France
	Report	Lejeune 2'; Joseph 10', 45+3', 55', 80'; Neller 14'; Rekha 15' (o.g.); Haugou 41' (pen.); Scannapiéco 49', 54'; Mé. Mendy 90+5' (pen.)

Estadio Atanasio Girardot, Medellín
Attendance: 434
Referee: Marcelly Zambrano (Ecuador)
6 September 2024
20:00

Canada	0–2	Brazil
	Report	Vendito 35'; Carol 90+9'

Estadio El Campín, Bogotá
Attendance: 4,351
Referee: Maria Sole Ferrieri (Italy)

=== Group C ===
Pos	Team	Pld	W	D	L	GF	GA	GD	Pts	Qualification
1	Spain	3	3	0	0	5	0	+5	9	Knockout stage
2	United States	3	2	0	1	9	1	+8	6	Knockout stage
3	Paraguay	3	1	0	2	2	9	−7	3	
4	Morocco	3	0	0	3	0	6	−6	0	

Source: FIFA
Rules for classification: Group stage tiebreakers
1 September 2024
15:00

Spain	1–0	United States
Enrique 8'	Report

Estadio Pascual Guerrero, Cali
Attendance: 9,979
Referee: Anahí Fernández (Uruguay)
1 September 2024
18:00

Paraguay	2–0	Morocco
Acosta 37', 56' (pen.)	Report

Estadio Pascual Guerrero, Cali
Attendance: 6,148
Referee: Iuliana Demetrescu (Romania)

4 September 2024
17:00

Spain	2–0	Paraguay
Amezaga 20', 37'	Report

Estadio Pascual Guerrero, Cali
Attendance: 2,366
Referee: Dong Fangyu (China)
4 September 2024
20:00

Morocco	0–2	United States
	Report	McCormack 48'; Dahlien 90+6'

Estadio Pascual Guerrero, Cali
Attendance: 1,882
Referee: María Victoria Daza (Colombia)

7 September 2024
18:00

Morocco	0–2	Spain
	Report	Aparicio 5'; Moral 89'

Estadio Pascual Guerrero, Cali
Attendance: 2,851
Referee: Oh Hyeon-jeong (South Korea)
7 September 2024
18:00

United States	7–0	Paraguay
Tordin 10', 12', 67'; Thompson 29'; McCormack 44'; Sentnor 52'; Dahlien 83'	Report

Estadio El Techo, Bogotá
Attendance: 2,358
Referee: Ivana Projkovska (North Macedonia)

=== Group D ===
Pos	Team	Pld	W	D	L	GF	GA	GD	Pts	Qualification
1	Germany	3	2	0	1	8	4	+4	6	Knockout stage
2	Nigeria	3	2	0	1	6	3	+3	6	Knockout stage
3	South Korea	3	1	1	1	1	1	0	4	Knockout stage
4	Venezuela	3	0	1	2	2	9	−7	1	

Source: FIFA
Rules for classification: Group stage tiebreakers
1 September 2024
15:00

Germany	5–2	Venezuela
Steiner 15'; Bender 38' (pen.), 45+6'; Nachtigall 44'; Zicai 56'	Report	Adamczyk 43' (o.g.); Apóstol 90+5'

Estadio El Techo, Bogotá
Attendance: 1,971
Referee: Natalie Simon (United States)
1 September 2024
18:00

Nigeria	1–0	South Korea
Sabastine 86'	Report

Estadio El Techo, Bogotá
Attendance: 870
Referee: Karen Hernández (Mexico)

4 September 2024
17:00

Germany	3–1	Nigeria
Şehitler 17'; Zdebel 61'; Ernst 90+3'	Report	Okwuchukwu 50'

Estadio El Techo, Bogotá
Attendance: 1,393
Referee: Astrid Gramajo (Guatemala)
4 September 2024
20:00

South Korea	0–0	Venezuela
	Report

Estadio El Techo, Bogotá
Attendance: 1,680
Referee: Crystal Sobers (Trinidad & Tobago)

7 September 2024
15:00

South Korea	1–0	Germany
Park Soo-jeong 22'	Report

Estadio El Techo, Bogotá
Attendance: 1,987
Referee: Anahí Fernández (Uruguay)
7 September 2024
15:00

Venezuela	0–4	Nigeria
	Report	Bello 16'; Okwuchukwu 28'; Sabastine 45+5'; Igbokwe 90+4'

Estadio Pascual Guerrero, Cali
Attendance: 1,693
Referee: Marta Huerta de Aza (Spain)

=== Group E ===
Pos	Team	Pld	W	D	L	GF	GA	GD	Pts	Qualification
1	Japan	3	3	0	0	13	1	+12	9	Knockout stage
2	Austria	3	2	0	1	5	4	+1	6	Knockout stage
3	Ghana	3	1	0	2	5	7	−2	3	
4	New Zealand	3	0	0	3	2	13	−11	0	

Source: FIFA
Rules for classification: Group stage tiebreakers
2 September 2024
17:00

Ghana	1–2	Austria
Nyamekye 90+1'	Report	Fankhauser 12'; Ojukwu 71' (pen.)

Estadio El Techo, Bogotá
Attendance: 1,405
Referee: Veronika Bernatskaia (Kyrgyzstan)
2 September 2024
20:00

Japan	7–0	New Zealand
Hijikata 16', 38'; Sasai 41', 90+1'; Oyama 45'; Koyama 60'; Hayama 75'	Report

Estadio El Techo, Bogotá
Attendance: 1,045
Referee: Dione Rissios (Chile)

5 September 2024
17:00

Japan	4–1	Ghana
Sasai 45'; Matsukubo 45+6'; Hayama 50'; Matsunaga 90'	Report	Nyamekye 83' (pen.)

Estadio El Techo, Bogotá
Attendance: 1,041
Referee: Karen Hernández (Mexico)
5 September 2024
20:00

Austria	3–1	New Zealand
Gutmann 10', 15'; Mädl 67'	Report	Clegg 90'

Estadio El Techo, Bogotá
Attendance: 852
Referee: Akissi Konan (Côte d'Ivoire)

8 September 2024
18:00

Austria	0–2	Japan
	Report	Hijikata 38', 79'

Estadio El Techo, Bogotá
Attendance: 1,387
Referee: Shahenda El Maghrabi (Egypt)
8 September 2024
18:00

New Zealand	1–3	Ghana
Elliott 64'	Report	Abdulai 59', 72'; Twum 90+6'

Estadio Pascual Guerrero, Cali
Attendance: 1,613
Referee: María Victoria Daza (Colombia)

=== Group F ===
Pos	Team	Pld	W	D	L	GF	GA	GD	Pts	Qualification
1	North Korea	3	3	0	0	17	2	+15	9	Knockout stage
2	Netherlands	3	1	1	1	5	5	0	4	Knockout stage
3	Argentina	3	1	1	1	6	9	−3	4	Knockout stage
4	Costa Rica	3	0	0	3	0	12	−12	0	

Source: FIFA
Rules for classification: Group stage tiebreakers
2 September 2024
17:00

North Korea	6–2	Argentina
Pak Mi-ryong 6'; Jon Ryong-jong 10'; Aprile 45+2' (o.g.); Sin Hyang 47'; Choe Il-son 75'; Choe Kang-ryon 90+2'	Report	Núñez 45+5', 82'

Estadio Pascual Guerrero, Cali
Attendance: 1,428
Referee: Ivana Projkovska (North Macedonia)
2 September 2024
20:00

Costa Rica	0–2	Netherlands
	Report	Buurman 24'; Oude Elberink 76'

Estadio Pascual Guerrero, Cali
Attendance: 1,128
Referee: Akissi Konan (Côte d'Ivoire)

5 September 2024
17:00

North Korea	9–0	Costa Rica
Benavides 6' (o.g.); Chae Un-yong 8'; Choe Il-son 28', 34'; Pak Mi-ryong 43'; Kim Song-gyong 49', 55'; Jong Kum 69'; Choe Kang-ryon 85'	Report

Estadio Pascual Guerrero, Cali
Attendance: 1,446
Referee: Dione Rissios (Chile)
5 September 2024
20:00

Netherlands	3–3	Argentina
Buurman 16'; Van Egmond 38'; Lacroix 45+2'	Report	Domínguez 43'; Rodríguez 48', 71'

Estadio Pascual Guerrero, Cali
Attendance: 1,886
Referee: Veronika Bernatskaia (Kyrgyzstan)

8 September 2024
15:00

Netherlands	0–2	North Korea
	Report	Choe Il-son 45+2'; Jong Kum 64'

Estadio Pascual Guerrero, Cali
Attendance: 2,113
Referee: Astrid Gramajo (Guatemala)
8 September 2024
15:00

Argentina	1–0	Costa Rica
Núñez 18'	Report

Estadio El Techo, Bogotá
Attendance: 1,669
Referee: Dong Fangyu (China)

=== Ranking of third-placed teams ===
The four best third-placed teams from the six groups advance to the knockout stage along with the six group winners and six runners-up.

Pos	Grp	Team	Pld	W	D	L	GF	GA	GD	Pts	Qualification
1	B	Canada	3	1	1	1	12	5	+7	4	Knockout stage
2	A	Cameroon	3	1	1	1	4	3	+1	4	Knockout stage
3	D	South Korea	3	1	1	1	1	1	0	4	Knockout stage
4	F	Argentina	3	1	1	1	6	9	−3	4	Knockout stage
5	E	Ghana	3	1	0	2	5	7	−2	3	
6	C	Paraguay	3	1	0	2	2	9	−7	3	

Source: FIFA
Rules for classification: Group stage tiebreakers

== Knockout stage ==
In the knockout stage, if a match was level at the end of normal playing time, extra time was played (two periods of fifteen minutes each) and followed, if necessary, by a penalty shoot-out to determine the winner.

Combinations of matches in the Round of 16

The specific match-ups involving the third-placed teams depended on which four third-placed teams qualified for the round of 16:

Combination according to the four qualified teams

Third-placed teams qualify from groups						1A vs	1B vs	1C vs	1D vs
A	B	C	D			3C	3D	3A	3B
A	B	C		E		3C	3A	3B	3E
A	B	C			F	3C	3A	3B	3F
A	B		D	E		3D	3A	3B	3E
A	B		D		F	3D	3A	3B	3F
A	B			E	F	3E	3A	3B	3F
A		C	D	E		3C	3D	3A	3E
A		C	D		F	3C	3D	3A	3F
A		C		E	F	3C	3A	3F	3E
A			D	E	F	3D	3A	3F	3E
	B	C	D	E		3C	3D	3B	3E
	B	C	D		F	3C	3D	3B	3F
	B	C		E	F	3E	3C	3B	3F
	B		D	E	F	3E	3D	3B	3F
		C	D	E	F	3C	3D	3F	3E

=== Bracket ===
Round of 16
11 September – Bogotá (Campín)
Mexico	2
United States (a.e.t.)	3
12 September – Bogotá (Techo)
Germany	5
Argentina	1
11 September – Bogotá (Campín)
Brazil (a.e.t.)	3
Cameroon	1
12 September – Medellín
North Korea	5
Austria	2
12 September – Bogotá (Techo)
Japan	2
Nigeria	1
11 September – Cali
Spain	2
Canada	1
12 September – Medellín
France	1
Netherlands (a.e.t.)	2
11 September – Cali
Colombia	1
South Korea	0

Quarter-finals
15 September – Cali
United States (p)	2 (3)
Germany	2 (1)
15 September – Medellín
Brazil	0
North Korea	1
15 September – Medellín
Japan (a.e.t.)	1
Spain	0
15 September – Cali
Netherlands (p)	2 (3)
Colombia	2 (0)

Semi-finals
18 September – Cali
United States	0
North Korea	1
18 September – Cali
Japan	2
Netherlands	0

Final
22 September – Bogotá (Campín)
North Korea	1
Japan	0
Third place match
21 September – Bogotá (Campín)
United States (a.e.t.)	2
Netherlands	1

=== Round of 16 ===
11 September 2024
16:30

Brazil	3–1 (a.e.t.)	Cameroon
Priscila 35' (pen.); Dudinha 91', 120+4'	Report	Eto 22'

Estadio El Campín, Bogotá
Attendance: 2,953
Referee: Maria Sole Ferrieri (Italy)

11 September 2024
16:30

Spain	2–1	Canada
Amezaga 65'; Lloris 81'	Report	Jourde 63'

Estadio Pascual Guerrero, Cali
Attendance: 10,409
Referee: Oh Hyeon-jeong (South Korea)

11 September 2024
20:00

Mexico	2–3 (a.e.t.)	United States
Vargas 22'; Gilchrist 39' (o.g.)	Report	Tordin 10'; Sentnor 27'; Dudley 97'

Estadio El Campín, Bogotá
Attendance: 4,352
Referee: Iuliana Demetrescu (Romania)

11 September 2024
20:00

Colombia	1–0	South Korea
Caicedo 64'	Report

Estadio Pascual Guerrero, Cali
Attendance: 35,256
Referee: Marta Huerta de Aza (Spain)

12 September 2024
16:30

Germany	5–1	Argentina
Janzen 6'; Nachtigall 24', 37'; Bender 26'; Zicai 69'	Report	Lombardi 43'

Estadio El Techo, Bogotá
Attendance: 1,354
Referee: Shahenda El Maghrabi (Egypt)

12 September 2024
16:30

North Korea	5–2	Austria
Sin Hyang 3', 37'; Kim Kang-mi 53'; Chae Un-yong 74'; Pak Mi-ryong 90+2'	Report	Mädl 11'; Han Hong-ryon 63' (o.g.)

Estadio Atanasio Girardot, Medellín
Attendance: 1,788
Referee: Dione Rissios (Chile)

12 September 2024
20:00

Japan	2–1	Nigeria
Matsunaga 33'; Hijikata 65'	Report	Shobowale 90+1'

Estadio El Techo, Bogotá
Attendance: 1,478
Referee: Natalie Simon (United States)

12 September 2024
20:00

France	1–2 (a.e.t.)	Netherlands
Mossard 33'	Report	Van Beijeren 59'; Stoit 103'

Estadio Atanasio Girardot, Medellín
Attendance: 3,157
Referee: Ivana Martinčić (Croatia)

=== Quarter-finals ===
15 September 2024
14:30

Brazil	0–1	North Korea
	Report	Chae Un-yong 49'

Estadio Atanasio Girardot, Medellín
Attendance: 5,844
Referee: Marta Huerta de Aza (Spain)

15 September 2024
16:30

Netherlands	2–2 (a.e.t.)	Colombia
Stoit 37'; Weiman 85'	Report	Torres 14', 63'
Penalties
De Ridder (penalty scored); Kroese (penalty scored); Buikema (penalty scored)	3–0	(penalty missed) Rodríguez; (penalty missed) Osorio; (penalty missed) Ortegón

Estadio Pascual Guerrero, Cali
Attendance: 37,382
Referee: Dong Fangyu (China)

15 September 2024
18:00

Japan	1–0 (a.e.t.)	Spain
Yoneda 102'	Report

Estadio Atanasio Girardot, Medellín
Attendance: 4,583
Referee: Anahí Fernández (Uruguay)

15 September 2024
20:15 (Note: The match, originally scheduled for 20:00 local time, was delayed to prevent overlap with the previous game in Cali (Netherlands—Colombia) which finished on penalty shoot-out.)

United States	2–2 (a.e.t.)	Germany
Dudley 90+8'; Veit 90+9' (o.g.)	Report	Zicai 61' (pen.); Bender 90+2'
Penalties
Sentnor (penalty scored); Klenke (penalty scored); Jackson (penalty scored)	3–1	(penalty scored) Veit; (penalty missed) Platner; (penalty missed) Diehm; (penalty missed) Şehitler

Estadio Pascual Guerrero, Cali
Attendance: 3,500
Referee: Oh Hyeon-jeong (South Korea)

=== Semi-finals ===
18 September 2024
16:30

United States	0–1	North Korea
	Report	Choe Il-son 22'

Estadio Pascual Guerrero, Cali
Attendance: 5,439
Referee: Ivana Martinčić (Croatia)

18 September 2024
20:00

Japan	2–0	Netherlands
Matsukubo 55', 83'	Report

Estadio Pascual Guerrero, Cali
Attendance: 8,733
Referee: Karen Hernández (Mexico)

=== Third place match ===
21 September 2024
16:00

United States	2–1 (a.e.t.)	Netherlands
Sentnor 10'; Buikema 119' (o.g.)	Report	Lacroix 26'

Estadio El Campín, Bogotá
Attendance: 11,008
Referee: Shahenda El Maghrabi (Egypt)

=== Final ===
22 September 2024
16:00

North Korea	1–0	Japan
Choe Il-son 15'	Report

Estadio El Campín, Bogotá
Attendance: 32,908
Referee: Maria Sole Ferrieri (Italy)

2024 FIFA U-20 Women's World Cup winners

North Korea
Third title

== Awards ==
The following awards were given for the tournament:

Golden Ball	Silver Ball	Bronze Ball
(North Korea) Choe Il-son	(Japan) Manaka Matsukubo	(United States) Ally Sentnor
Golden Boot	Silver Boot	Bronze Boot
(North Korea) Choe Il-son	(Brazil) Vendito	(Japan) Maya Hijikata
6 goals	5 goals, 1 assist 404 minutes played	5 goals, 1 assist 590 minutes played
Golden Glove
(Netherlands) Femke Liefting
FIFA Fair Play Award
Japan

== Goalscorers ==
There were 187 goals scored in 52 matches, for an average of 3.6 goals per match.

6 goals

- (North Korea) Choe Il-son

5 goals

- (Brazil) Vendito
- (Japan) Maya Hijikata

4 goals

- (Cameroon) Naomi Eto
- (Canada) Annabelle Chukwu
- (France) Liana Joseph
- (France) Dona Scannapiéco
- (Germany) Loreen Bender
- (United States) Pietra Tordin

3 goals

- (Argentina) Kishi Núñez
- (Brazil) Priscila
- (Germany) Sophie Nachtigall
- (Germany) Cora Zicai
- (Japan) Manaka Matsukubo
- (Japan) Chinari Sasai
- (North Korea) Chae Un-yong
- (North Korea) Pak Mi-ryong
- (North Korea) Sin Hyang
- (Spain) Jone Amezaga
- (United States) Ally Sentnor

2 goals

- (Argentina) Serena Rodríguez
- (Austria) Sarah Gutmann
- (Austria) Valentina Mädl
- (Brazil) Dudinha
- (Brazil) Vitória Amaral
- (Canada) Kayla Briggs
- (Canada) Olivia Smith
- (Colombia) Linda Caicedo
- (Colombia) Karla Torres
- (Ghana) Salamatu Abdulai
- (Ghana) Stella Nyamekye
- (Japan) Miku Hayama
- (Japan) Miyu Matsunaga
- (Netherlands) Veerle Buurman
- (Netherlands) Robine Lacroix
- (Netherlands) Fleur Stoit
- (Nigeria) Chiamaka Okwuchukwu
- (Nigeria) Flourish Sabastine
- (North Korea) Choe Kang-ryon
- (North Korea) Jong Kum
- (North Korea) Kim Song-gyong
- (Paraguay) Fátima Acosta
- (United States) Maddie Dahlien
- (United States) Jordynn Dudley
- (United States) Yuna McCormack

1 goal

- (Argentina) Sofía Domínguez
- (Argentina) Delfina Lombardi
- (Austria) Hannah Fankhauser
- (Austria) Nicole Ojukwu
- (Brazil) Carol
- (Brazil) Fernanda
- (Brazil) Gisele
- (Brazil) Lara
- (Brazil) Milena
- (Cameroon) Achta Toko Njoya
- (Canada) Florianne Jourde
- (Canada) Zoe Markesini
- (Canada) Ella McBride
- (Canada) Ella Ottey
- (Canada) Nyah Rose
- (Colombia) Mary Espitaleta
- (Colombia) Yunaira López
- (Colombia) Yésica Muñoz
- (France) Hillary Diaz
- (France) Pauline Haugou
- (France) Romane Lejeune
- (France) Mélinda Mendy
- (France) Juliette Mossard
- (France) Chloé Neller
- (Germany) Sarah Ernst
- (Germany) Mathilde Janzen
- (Germany) Alara Şehitler
- (Germany) Marie Steiner
- (Germany) Sofie Zdebel
- (Ghana) Tracey Twum
- (Japan) Shinomi Koyama
- (Japan) Aemu Oyama
- (Japan) Hiromi Yoneda
- (Mexico) Paola García
- (Mexico) Alejandra Lomelí
- (Mexico) Montserrat Saldívar
- (Mexico) Fátima Servín
- (Mexico) Valerie Vargas
- (Netherlands) Eva Oude Elberink
- (Netherlands) Jet van Beijeren
- (Netherlands) Bo van Egmond
- (Netherlands) Inske Weiman
- (New Zealand) Milly Clegg
- (New Zealand) Manaia Elliott
- (Nigeria) Amina Bello
- (Nigeria) Joy Igbokwe
- (Nigeria) Olushola Shobowale
- (North Korea) Jon Ryong-jong
- (North Korea) Kim Kang-mi
- (South Korea) Park Soo-jeong
- (Spain) Nahia Aparicio
- (Spain) Olaya Enrique
- (Spain) Silvia Lloris
- (Spain) Lucía Moral
- (United States) Gisele Thompson
- (Venezuela) Floriangel Apóstol

1 own goal

- (Argentina) Paulina Aprile (against North Korea)
- (Costa Rica) Saray Benavides (against North Korea)
- (Fiji) Angeline Rekha (against France)
- (Germany) Rebecca Adamczyk (against Venezuela)
- (Germany) Jella Veit (against United States)
- (Netherlands) Nayomi Buikema (against United States)
- (North Korea) Han Hong-ryon (against Austria)
- (United States) Heather Gilchrist (against Mexico)

== Marketing ==
=== Emblem ===
The official emblem was unveiled on 8 April 2024. According to FIFA's website:

...[The] vibrant design [is] inspired by the stunning nature and colour of host nation Colombia as well as the tournament's fundamental role in forging the Future Stars of Football. Using the South American country's unique and iconic Caño Cristales river, nicknamed 'Liquid Rainbow', as the central theme of the design, the tournament emblem also features the yellow, blue and red of the Colombian flag to make it the perfect blended reflection of the tournament hosts and the competition itself.

=== Theme song ===
The official theme song was revealed on 16 August 2024 under the title "Aheh-Aheh" (styled sometimes in uppercase) sung by Colombian artists Nath and Ysa C. It is also known as "the 10th anniversary song" like "Vamos Juntas", the song from the preceding edition.

=== Mascot ===
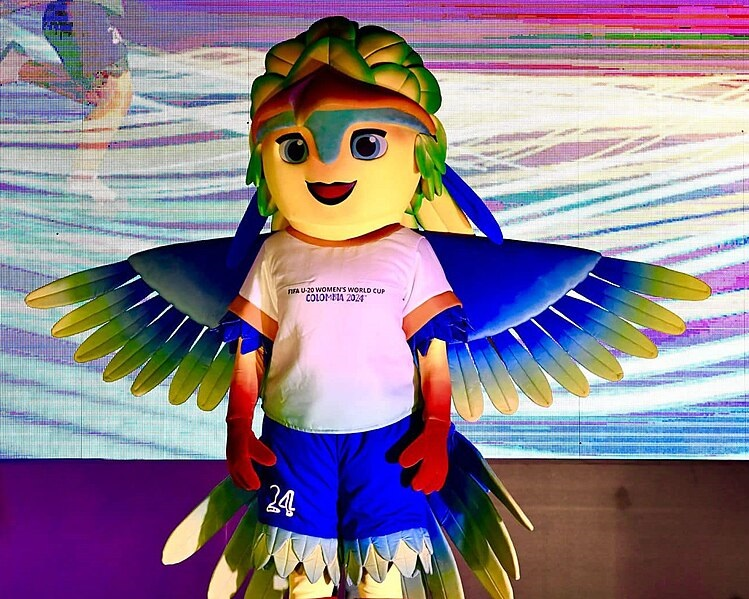
Kinti, Oficial mascot in his presentation

The tournament's mascot was named "Kinti". The mascot represented the biodiversity of the country and shaped after a hummingbird. Kinti was unveiled on 23 May 2024 at the Botanical Garden of Medellín.

== See also ==
- 2024 FIFA U-17 Women's World Cup
