= Anat Maimoni =

Israeli footballer

Anat Maimoni ענת מימוני
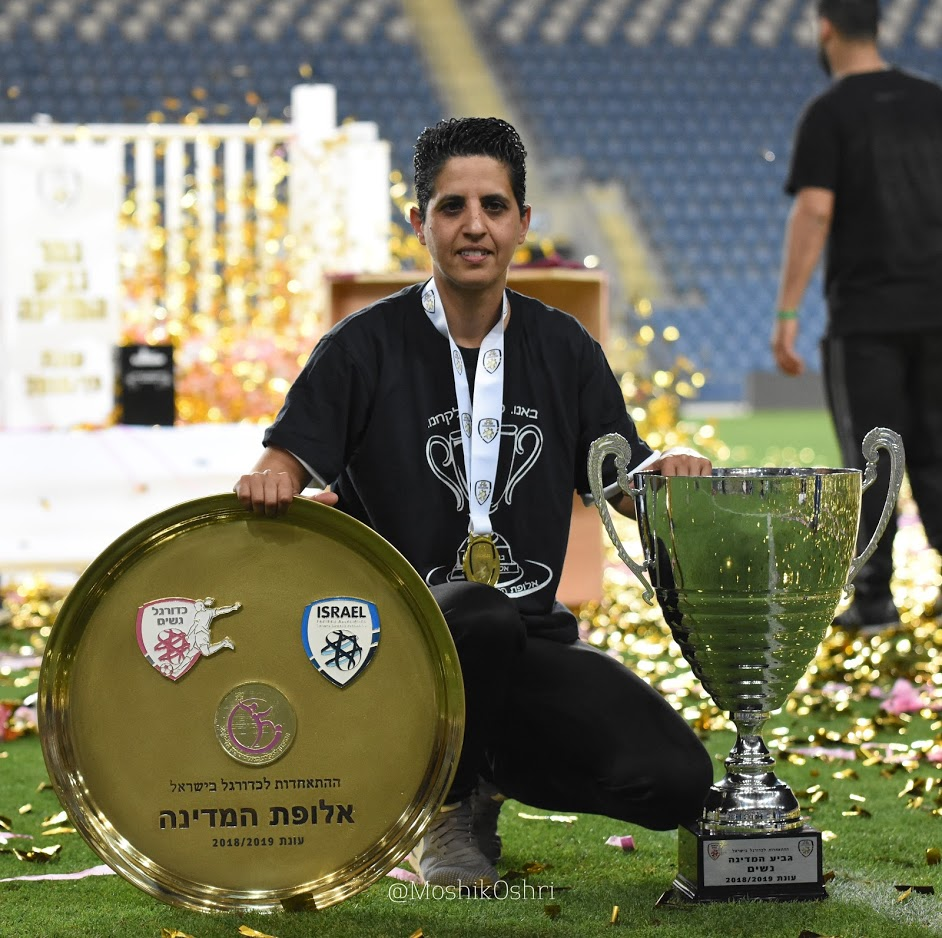
- Maimoni in 2019

Personal information
- Date of birth: 5 February 1982 (age 44)
- Place of birth: Jerusalem, Israel
- Position: Midfielder

Team information
- Current team: ASA Tel Aviv University

Senior career*
Years	Team	Apps	(Gls)
1998–2013	ASA Tel Aviv University		
2013–2015	→ Maccabi Holon (loan)	32	(0)

International career^{‡}
2000–2008	Israel	26	(0)
- * Club domestic league appearances and goals as of 9 November 2015 ‡ National team caps and goals as of 9 November 2015

Anat Maimoni (Hebrew: ענת מימוני; born 5 February 1982) is an Israeli football midfielder.

== Club career ==
Maimoni had played in the Israeli First League since its inception in 1998 with ASA Tel Aviv University, winning 5 championship titles and 2 national cups with the club, as well as playing in the UEFA Women's Champions League.

== International career ==
Maimoni played for the national team between 2000 and 2008, appearing in 26 matches.

== Honours ==
- Championships (5):
  - With ASA Tel Aviv University: 1999–2000, 2009–10, 2010–11, 2011–12, 2012–13
- Cup (2):
  - With ASA Tel Aviv University: 2010–11, 2011–12
