= 2005–06 Ligat Nashim =

Ligat Nashim Rishona
- Season: 2005–06
- Matches: 167
- Goals: 1,244 (7.45 per match)

The 2005–06 Ligat Nashim is the eighth season of women's league football under the Israeli Football Association.

The league was won by Maccabi Holon, its second title. By winning, Maccabi Holon qualified to 2006–07 UEFA Women's Cup.

== Regular season results ==
=== Northern Division ===
Pos	Team	Pld	W	D	L	GF	GA	GD	Pts	Qualification
1	F.C. Ramat HaSharon	8	7	1	0	68	6	+62	22	Championship Group
2	ASA Tel Aviv University	8	6	2	0	79	3	+76	20	Championship Group
3	Maccabi Kishronot Hadera	8	6	1	1	50	13	+37	19	Championship Group
4	Bnot Caesarea Tiv'on	8	4	1	3	22	26	−4	13	Championship Group
5	Hakoah Amidar Ramat Gan	8	4	0	4	32	34	−2	12	Bottom Group
6	Bnot Sakhnin	8	2	2	4	13	39	−26	8	Bottom Group
7	Hapoel Ironi Petah Tikva	8	2	0	6	13	30	−17	6	Bottom Group
8	Maccabi Tzur Shalom Bialik	8	1	1	6	19	35	−16	4	Bottom Group
9	Bnot Beit She'an	8	0	0	8	3	113	−110	0	Bottom Group

=== Southern Division ===
Pos	Team	Pld	W	D	L	GF	GA	GD	Pts	Qualification
1	Maccabi Holon	8	8	0	0	131	0	+131	24	Championship Group
2	Hapoel Be'er Sheva	8	7	0	1	40	8	+32	21	Championship Group
3	Bnot Hadar Yosef	8	5	0	3	24	15	+9	15	Championship Group
4	Ironi Bat Yam	8	5	0	3	20	32	−12	15	Championship Group
5	Hapoel Marmorek	8	4	0	4	20	29	−9	12	Bottom Group
6	Maccabi Be'er Sheva	8	3	1	4	14	44	−30	10	Bottom Group
7	Hapoel Rishon LeZion	8	2	0	6	4	48	−44	6	Bottom Group
8	Beitar Jerusalem	8	1	1	6	6	42	−36	4	Bottom Group
9	Beitar Be'er Sheva	8	0	0	8	5	46	−41	0	Bottom Group

== Playoff results ==
=== Championship group ===
Pos	Team	Pld	W	D	L	GF	GA	GD	Pts	Qualification
1	Maccabi Holon	14	13	1	0	140	3	+137	40	Qualification to UEFA Women's Cup
2	ASA Tel Aviv University	14	12	1	1	63	8	+55	37	
3	F.C. Ramat HaSharon	14	10	0	4	76	29	+47	30	
4	Maccabi Kishronot Hadera	14	7	0	7	40	32	+8	21	
5	Hapoel Be'er Sheva	14	7	0	7	39	38	+1	21	
6	Bnot Caesarea Tiv'on	14	4	0	10	33	58	−25	12	
7	Bnot Hadar Yosef	14	2	0	12	19	84	−65	6	
8	Ironi Bat Yam	14	0	0	14	5	163	−158	0	

=== Bottom group ===
Pos	Team	Pld	W	D	L	GF	GA	GD	Pts
1	Maccab Tzur Shalom Bialik	9	7	2	0	32	9	+23	23
2	Hapoel Marmorek	9	6	1	2	52	20	+32	19
3	Maccabi Be'er Sheva	9	6	0	3	35	14	+21	18
4	Bnot Sakhnin	9	5	2	2	31	12	+19	17
5	Hapoel Petah Tikva	9	5	1	3	34	12	+22	16
6	Hapoel Rishon LeZion	9	5	0	4	19	16	+3	15
7	Beitar Jerusalem	9	4	1	4	16	22	−6	13
8	Hakoah Amidar Ramat Gan	9	1	1	7	20	34	−14	4
9	Beitar Be'er Sheva	9	1	0	8	7	51	−44	3
10	Bnot Beit She'an	9	1	0	8	12	68	−56	3
