= Pindoretama =

Municipality in Ceará, Brazil

Coordinates: 4°02′S 38°18′W

- Municipality
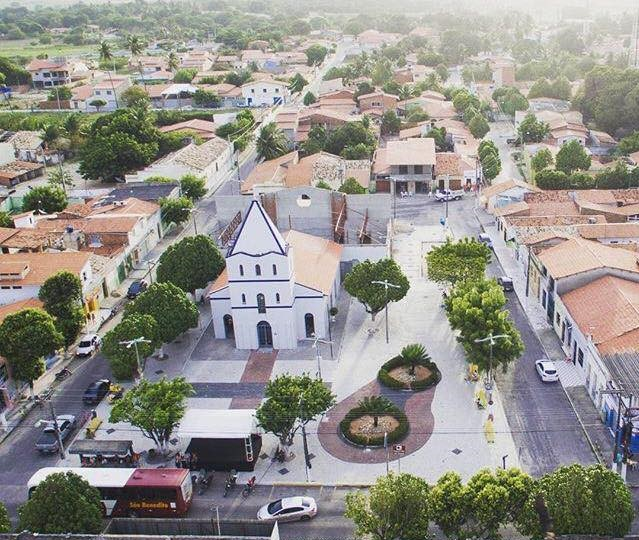
- View of Pindoretama

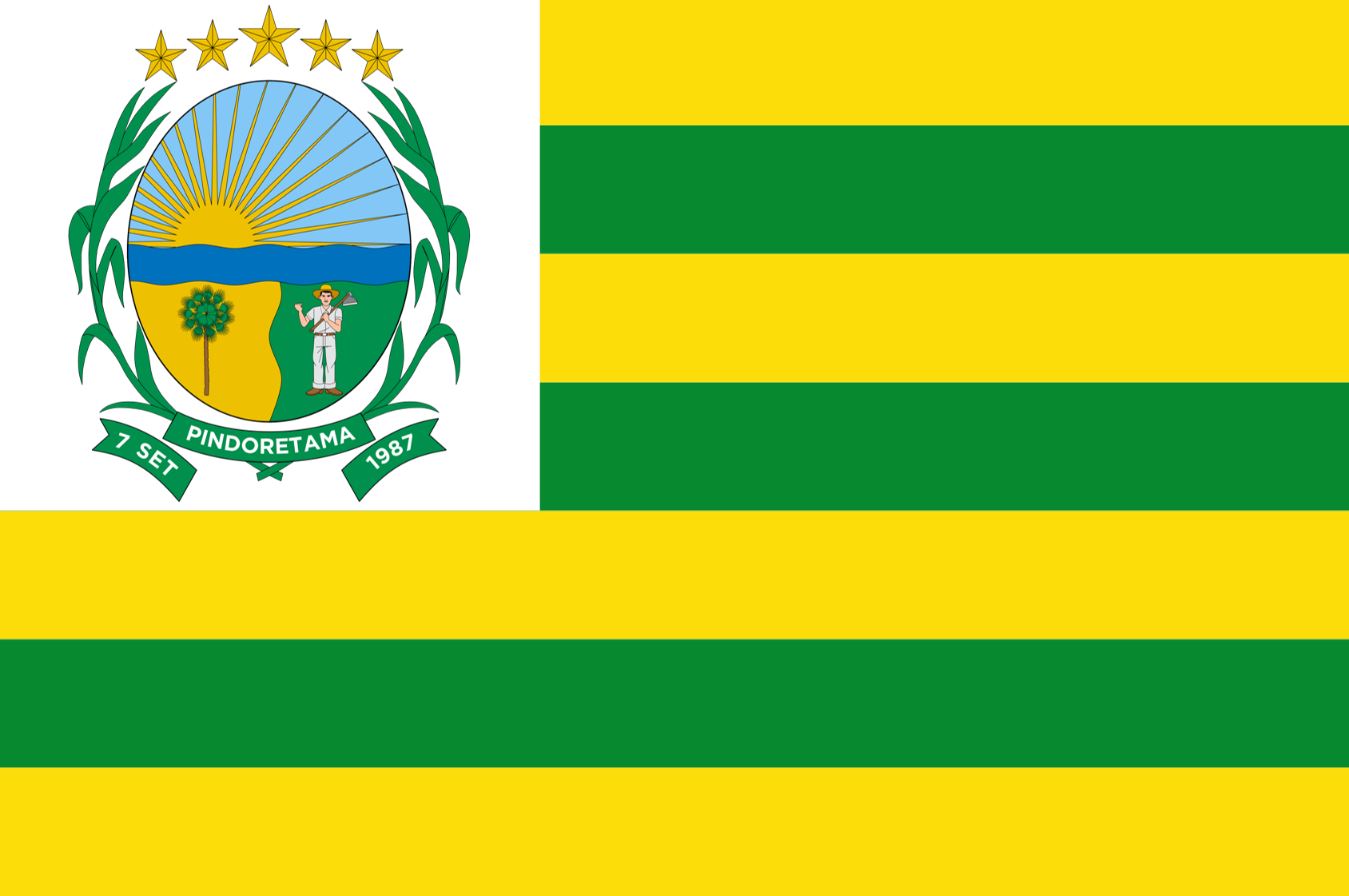
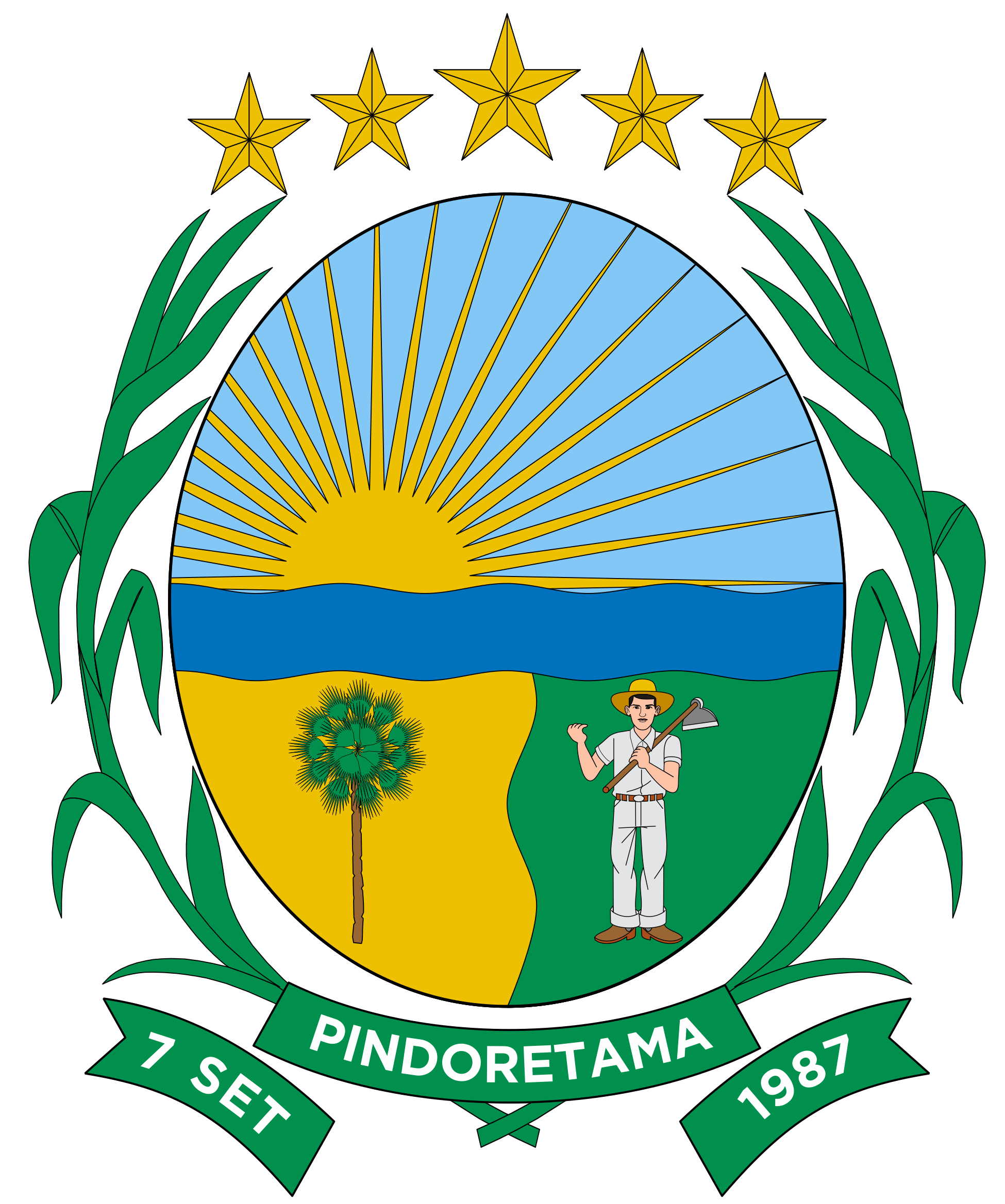
- Flag Coat of arms
- Interactive map of Pindoretama
- Country: Brazil
- Region: Nordeste
- State: Ceará
- Mesoregion: Noroeste Cearense

Population (2020)
  - Total: 20,769
- Time zone: UTC−3 (BRT)

Pindoretama is a municipality in the state of Ceará in the Northeast region of Brazil.

== See also ==
- List of municipalities in Ceará
