= 2004–05 Ligat Nashim =

Ligat Nashim Rishona
- Season: 2004–05
- Matches: 187
- Goals: 1,370 (7.33 per match)

The 2004–05 Ligat Nashim is the seventh season of women's league football under the Israeli Football Association. The league began on 26 January 2005, following a Supreme Court ruling which ordered Minister of Education, Culture and Sport, Limor Livnat to introduce measures to equal funding for women football clubs.

The league was won by Maccabi Holon, its second title. By winning, Maccabi Holon qualified to 2005–06 UEFA Women's Cup.

== League format ==
With a record number of 19 teams registered to play, the league was split into two divisions, Northern and Southern. Following a single round of play, the top four teams in each division progressed to the Championship Group, which was played as double round-robin tournament, while the rest of the teams were placed in the bottom group, which was played as a single round-robin tournament. For the second phase, all points gathered by the teams in the first phase was erased and both groups started with a clean slate.

== Regular season results ==
=== Northern Division ===
With 9 teams in the division, teams played 8 matches in the regular season.

Pos	Team	Pld	W	D	L	GF	GA	GD	Pts	Qualification
1	ASA Tel Aviv University	8	8	0	0	91	3	+88	24	Championship Group
2	Maccabi Kishronot Hadera	8	6	1	1	48	7	+41	19	Championship Group
3	Bnot Haifa	8	6	0	2	55	14	+41	18	Championship Group
4	Bnot Hadar Yosef	8	4	1	3	37	17	+20	13	Championship Group
5	Bnot Tiv'on	8	4	0	4	44	18	+26	12	Bottom Group
6	Hapoel Ironi Petah Tikva	8	2	2	4	29	22	+7	8	Bottom Group
7	Bnot Sakhnin	8	2	2	4	21	25	−4	8	Bottom Group
8	Maccabi Tzur Shalom Bialik	8	1	0	7	14	60	−46	3	Bottom Group
9	Bnot Beit She'an	8	0	0	8	1	174	−173	0	Bottom Group

=== Southern Division ===
With 10 teams in the division, teams played 9 matches in the regular season.

Pos	Team	Pld	W	D	L	GF	GA	GD	Pts	Qualification
1	Maccabi Holon	9	9	0	0	121	0	+121	27	Championship Group
2	Ironi Jerusalem	9	8	0	1	55	16	+39	24	Championship Group
3	Hapoel Marmorek	9	7	0	2	50	12	+38	21	Championship Group
4	Hapoel Be'er Sheva	9	6	0	3	46	20	+26	18	Championship Group
5	Ironi Bat Yam	9	5	0	4	23	20	+3	15	Bottom Group
6	Hapoel Rishon LeZion	9	4	0	5	19	26	−7	12	Bottom Group
7	Beitar Jerusalem	9	2	0	7	13	34	−21	6	Bottom Group
8	Bnot Kiryat Gat	9	2	0	7	13	54	−41	6	Bottom Group
9	Ironi Ariel	9	2	0	7	4	71	−67	6	Bottom Group
10	Maccabi Be'er Sheva	9	0	0	9	0	91	−91	0	Bottom Group

== Playoff results ==
=== Championship group ===
Pos	Team	Pld	W	D	L	GF	GA	GD	Pts	Qualification
1	Maccabi Holon	14	14	0	0	120	5	+115	42	Qualification to UEFA Women's Cup
2	ASA Tel Aviv University	14	12	0	2	70	10	+60	36	
3	Maccabi Kishronot Hadera	14	7	1	6	26	37	−11	22	
4	Hapoel Marmorek	14	4	4	6	19	49	−30	16	
5	Hapoel Be'er Sheva	14	4	3	7	29	53	−24	15	
6	Ironi Jerusalem	14	4	3	7	29	53	−24	15	
7	Bnot Haifa	14	2	2	10	11	61	−50	8	
8	Bnot Hadar Yosef	14	2	1	11	10	63	−53	7	

=== Bottom group ===
Pos	Team	Pld	W	D	L	GF	GA	GD	Pts
1	Ironi Bat Yam	10	10	0	0	73	10	+63	30
2	Hapoel Petah Tikva	10	9	0	1	54	8	+46	27
3	Bnot Tiv'on	10	8	0	2	72	11	+61	24
4	Hapoel Rishon LeZion	10	6	0	4	43	21	+22	18
5	Maccabi Be'er Sheva	10	6	0	4	35	30	+5	18
6	Maccab Tzur Shalom Bialik	10	4	1	5	38	27	+11	13
7	Bnot Sakhnin	10	4	1	5	31	33	−2	13
8	Ironi Kiryat Gat	10	3	1	6	28	48	−20	10
9	Beitar Jerusalem	10	2	1	7	8	43	−35	7
10	Bnot Beit She'an	10	1	0	9	11	88	−77	3
11	Ironi Ariel	10	0	0	10	3	77	−74	0
