= Bnot Beit She'an F.C. =

Bnot Beit She'an
- Full name: Bnot Beit She'an Women's Football Club בנות בית שאן
- Founded: 2004
- Dissolved: 2007
- Ground: Beit She'an Municipal Stadium
- League: Ligat Nashim
- 2006–07 Liga Shniya: 3rd

Bnot Beit Shean (Hebrew: בנות בית שאן, lit.: Beit She'an Girls) was an Israeli women's football club from Beit She'an. The club competed in the Israeli Women's League and the Israeli Women's Cup between 2004 and 2007. At the end of the 2006–07 season the club folded.

== History ==
The club was founded in 2004 and joined the Israeli women's football league. The club played the 2004–05 season in the Northern division, finishing bottom, after losing its 8 matches in the division, conceding 100 goals in the club's first league matches and 174 goals overall. At the second half of the season the club played at the bottom group, and finished 10th out of 11 teams, scoring its first and only victory against bottom club, Ironi Ariel. The following season, the club again finished last in the Northern division, and finished last in the bottom group. At the beginning of the 2006–07 season, the IFA split the women's league into two division, and the club was placed in the second division. The club finished the season at the 3rd place (out of 5 teams), and at the end of the season folded, as did all the clubs which played in the second division.

== Seasons ==
Season	League									Cup	Coach
Season	Division	P	W	D	L	F	A	Pts	Pos	Cup	Coach
2004–05	Ligat Nashim; North	8	0	0	8	1	174	0	9th	1st round	Yossi Benfusi
2004–05	Bottom group	10	1	0	9	11	88	3	10th	1st round	Yossi Benfusi
2005–06	Ligat Nashim; North	8	0	0	8	3	113	0	9th	n/a	Gavriel Lerman
2005–06	Bottom group	14	4	0	10	33	58	12	6th	n/a	Gavriel Lerman
2006–07	2nd Div.	8	3	1	4	27	22	10	3rd	1st round (forfeited)	Gavriel Lerman
