= Choe Il-son =

North Korean footballer (born 2007)

Choe Il-son 최일선
Personal information
- Date of birth: 1 January 2007 (age 19)
- Place of birth: Kwail County, North Korea
- Height: 1.58 m (5 ft 2 in)
- Position: Striker

Team information
- Current team: April 25

Senior career*
Years	Team	Apps	(Gls)
2024–	April 25		

International career^{‡}
2024	North Korea U17	11	(7)
2024	North Korea U20	12	(7)
2025–	North Korea	8	(0)
Medal record
Women's football
Representing North Korea
AFC U-17 Women's Asian Cup
Winner	Indonesia 2024
AFC U-20 Women's Asian Cup
Winner	Uzbekistan 2024
FIFA U-17 Women's World Cup
Winner	Dominican Republic 2024
FIFA U-20 Women's World Cup
Winner	Colombia 2024
- * Club domestic league appearances and goals ‡ National team caps and goals as of 2 October 2026

Choe Il-son (Korean: 최일선; born 1 January 2007) is a North Korean professional footballer who plays as a Striker for April 25 and the North Korean national team.

== International career ==
Aged 17 in March 2024, Choe was selected to join the North Korea under-20 team for the 2024 AFC U-20 Women's Asian Cup. She featured in all five matches of the tournament, helping North Korea secure the championship title. In the semifinals, she scored the opening goal against rivals South Korea.

Two months later, she was named to the final squad for the 2024 AFC U-17 Women's Asian Cup in Indonesia. She helped North Korea win their fourth title, scoring 5 goals against hosts Indonesia.

In September 2024, she was selected for the final squad of the 2024 FIFA U-20 Women's World Cup. She played a crucial role in North Korea's third world title, scoring six goals to claim the Golden Boot, including the only goal in the final against Japan. She was also named the tournament's best player, earning the Golden Ball. a month later, she got selected for the 2024 FIFA U-17 Women's World Cup.

On 16 October 2025, Choe was named the AFC Women's Youth Player of the Year at the AFC Awards Riyadh 2025.

On 27th and 30th of November 2025, Choe was an unsused substitute for the North Korea squad that faced Russia in two friendly games hosted in Pyongyang.

In February 2026, Choe was named in the final North Korean squad for the 2026 AFC Women's Asian Cup. She made her national team debut in the second group stage game of the tournament against Bangladesh and delivered an assist for Kim Kyong-yong for the team's fourth goal, as North Korea win 5–0.

== International goals ==
=== North Korea U17 ===
No.	Date	Venue	Opponent	Score	Result	Competition
1.	12 May 2024	Kapten I Wayan Dipta Stadium, Gianyar, Indonesia	Indonesia	1–0	9–0	2024 AFC U-17 Women's Asian Cup
2.	12 May 2024	Kapten I Wayan Dipta Stadium, Gianyar, Indonesia	Indonesia	2–0	9–0	2024 AFC U-17 Women's Asian Cup
3.	12 May 2024	Kapten I Wayan Dipta Stadium, Gianyar, Indonesia	Indonesia	5–0	9–0	2024 AFC U-17 Women's Asian Cup
4.	12 May 2024	Kapten I Wayan Dipta Stadium, Gianyar, Indonesia	Indonesia	6–0	9–0	2024 AFC U-17 Women's Asian Cup
5.	12 May 2024	Kapten I Wayan Dipta Stadium, Gianyar, Indonesia	Indonesia	9–0	9–0	2024 AFC U-17 Women's Asian Cup
6.	17 October 2024	Estadio Cibao FC, Santiago de los Caballeros, Dominican Republic	Mexico	2–0	4–1	2024 FIFA U-17 Women's World Cup
7.	23 October 2024	Estadio Cibao FC, Santiago de los Caballeros, Dominican Republic	England	2–0	4–0	2024 FIFA U-17 Women's World Cup

=== North Korea U20 ===
No.	Date	Venue	Opponent	Score	Result	Competition
1.	13 March 2024	Do'stlik Stadium, Tashkent, Uzbekistan	South Korea	1–0	3–0	2024 AFC U-20 Women's Asian Cup
2.	2 September 2024	Estadio Olímpico Pascual Guerrero, Cali, Colombia	Argentina	5–1	6–2	2024 FIFA U-20 Women's World Cup
3.	5 September 2024	Estadio Olímpico Pascual Guerrero, Cali, Colombia	Costa Rica	3–0	9–0	2024 FIFA U-20 Women's World Cup
4.	5 September 2024	Estadio Olímpico Pascual Guerrero, Cali, Colombia	Costa Rica	4–0	9–0	2024 FIFA U-20 Women's World Cup
5.	8 September 2024	Estadio Olímpico Pascual Guerrero, Cali, Colombia	Netherlands	1–0	2–0	2024 FIFA U-20 Women's World Cup
6.	18 September 2024	Estadio Olímpico Pascual Guerrero, Cali, Colombia	United States	1–0	1–0	2024 FIFA U-20 Women's World Cup
7.	21 September 2024	Estadio El Campín, Bogotá, Colombia	Japan	1–0	1–0	2024 FIFA U-20 Women's World Cup

== Honours ==
North Korea U17

- AFC U-17 Women's Asian Cup: 2024
- FIFA U-17 Women's World Cup: 2024

North Korea U20

- AFC U-20 Women's Asian Cup: 2024
- FIFA U-20 Women's World Cup: 2024

Individual

- FIFA U-20 Women's World Cup Golden Ball: 2024
- FIFA U-20 Women's World Cup Golden Boot: 2024
- AFC Women's Youth Player of the Year: 2025
