= Hapoel Tel Aviv F.C. (women) =

Hapoel Tel Aviv
- Full name: Hapoel Tel Aviv Women's Football Club הפועל תל אביב נשים
- Founded: 1998, 2019 refounded
- Dissolved: 2002
- League: Israeli 2nd Division

Hapoel Tel Aviv (Hebrew: הפועל תל אביב) is an Israeli women's football club from Tel Aviv. The club competed in the Israeli First League and the Israeli Women's Cup, winning them both in 2000–01 and competing in 2001–02 UEFA Women's Cup. The club folded in 2002. The club relaunched in 2019 and competed in the third league. They won the third division title in 2020–21 and were promoted to the second league.

== Titles ==
- Ligat Nashim (1)
  - 2000–01
- Israeli Cup (1)
  - 2000–01
- Israeli 2nd League (1)
  - 2023–2024
- Israeli 3rd League (1)
  - 2020–2021
