= 2023–24 UEFA Women's Nations League promotion/relegation matches =

Tournament details
- Dates: 23–28 February 2024
- Teams: 14

Tournament statistics
- Matches played: 14
- Goals scored: 55 (3.93 per match)
- Attendance: 31,944 (2,282 per match)
- Top scorer(s): (Belgium) Tessa Wullaert (5 goals)

The 2023–24 UEFA Women's Nations League promotion/relegation matches were the promotion and relegation play-offs of the 2023–24 edition of the UEFA Women's Nations League, the inaugural season of the international football competition involving the women's national teams of the member associations of UEFA. The play-offs determined which teams would be promoted, relegated, or remain in their respective leagues for the UEFA Women's Euro 2025 qualifying competition.

At the end of play-offs, all team from the higher league had won the team from the lower league they faced, so no promotion and relegation through play-offs took place.

== Format ==
The promotion/relegation matches determined the composition of the leagues for UEFA Women's Euro 2025 qualifying, which used an identical league structure to the 2023–24 UEFA Women's Nations League. The matches were played home-and-away over two legs. If the team from the higher league was the winner, both teams would remain in their respective leagues, whereas if the team from the lower league won, they would be promoted to the higher league, with the losers relegated to the lower league.

The third-placed teams of League A played the runners-up of League B, while the three best-ranked third-placed teams in League B played the three best-ranked League C runners-up. The teams from the higher leagues were seeded, and played the second leg at home. In the two-legged ties, the team that scored more goals on aggregate was the winner. If the aggregate score was level, extra time was played (the away goals rule was not applied). If the score remained level after extra time, a penalty shoot-out was used to decide the winner.

== Draw ==
The draws for the promotion/relegation matches (for League A vs League B and League B vs League C) were held on 11 December 2023, 13:00 CET, at the UEFA headquarters in Nyon, Switzerland. They were held in tandem with the draw for the 2024 UEFA Women's Nations League Finals. In the draws, the teams from the higher leagues were seeded, while the teams from the lower leagues were unseeded. First a team was drawn from the unseeded pot, with their opponents then drawn from the seeded pot.

League A vs League B

League A (seeded)
Group	Third place
A1	Belgium
A2	Norway
A3	Iceland
A4	Sweden

League B (unseeded)
Group	Runners-up
B1	Hungary
B2	Croatia
B3	Serbia
B4	Bosnia and Herzegovina

League B vs League C

League B (seeded)
Group	Third place (best three qualify)
B1	Northern Ireland
B2	Slovakia
B3	Ukraine
B4	—

League C (unseeded)
Group	Runners-up (best three qualify)
C1	Latvia
C2	—
C3	Montenegro
C4	—
C5	Bulgaria

== Schedule ==
The first legs were played on 23 February, while the second legs were played on 27 and 28 February 2024.

Times are CET (UTC+1), as listed by UEFA (local times, if different, are in parentheses).

== League A vs League B ==
=== Summary ===
Team 1	Agg.	Team 2	1st leg	2nd leg
Serbia	2–3	Iceland	1–1	1–2
Hungary	2–10	Belgium	1–5	1–5
Bosnia and Herzegovina	0–10	Sweden	0–5	0–5
Croatia	0–8	Norway	0–3	0–5

=== Matches ===
23 February 2024
16:00

Serbia	1–1	Iceland
Filipović 19'	Report	Eiríksdóttir 24'

Serbian FA Sports Center, Stara Pazova
Attendance: 321
Referee: Ewa Augustyn (Poland)
27 February 2024
15:30 (14:30 WET)

Iceland	2–1	Serbia
Jónsdóttir 75'; Níelsdóttir 86'	Report	Poljak 6'

Kópavogsvöllur, Kópavogur
Attendance: 798
Referee: Marta Huerta de Aza (Spain)

Iceland won 3–2 on aggregate, and therefore both teams remained in their respective leagues.

23 February 2024
17:45

Hungary	1–5	Belgium
Turányi 7'	Report	Kees 10', 81'; Wullaert 20', 74'; Vanhaevermaet 65'

Pancho Aréna, Felcsút
Attendance: 1,113
Referee: Alina Peşu (Romania)
27 February 2024
20:00

Belgium	5–1	Hungary
Wullaert 44', 54' (pen.), 57'; Janssens 74', 80'	Report	Kaján 26'

Den Dreef, Leuven
Attendance: 3,794
Referee: Ivana Martinčić (Croatia)

Belgium won 10–2 on aggregate, and therefore both teams remained in their respective leagues.

23 February 2024
13:00

Bosnia and Herzegovina	0–5	Sweden
	Report	Janogy 6', 41'; Angeldahl 76'; Hammarlund 80'; Gvozderac 86' (o.g.)

Bosnia and Herzegovina FA Training Centre, Zenica
Attendance: 366
Referee: Olatz Rivera Olmedo (Spain)
28 February 2024
18:30

Sweden	5–0	Bosnia and Herzegovina
Vinberg 26'; Blackstenius 45'; Kafaji 45+1'; Angeldal 82'; Hammarlund 90'	Report

Tele2 Arena, Stockholm
Attendance: 11,463
Referee: Silvia Gasperotti (Italy)

Sweden won 10–0 on aggregate, and therefore both teams remained in their respective leagues.

23 February 2024
18:00

Croatia	0–3	Norway
	Report	Hegerberg 16'; Graham Hansen 49'; Bizet Ildhusøy 62'

Opus Arena, Osijek
Attendance: 3,132
Referee: Abigail Byrne (England)
27 February 2024
18:00

Norway	5–0	Croatia
Terland 9'; Román Haug 32', 40'; Maanum 66', 78'	Report

Viking Stadion, Stavanger
Attendance: 5,315
Referee: Veronika Kovářová (Czech Republic)

Norway won 8–0 on aggregate, and therefore both teams remained in their respective leagues.

== League B vs League C ==
=== Summary ===
Team 1	Agg.	Team 2	1st leg	2nd leg
Latvia	0–9	Slovakia	0–3	0–6
Montenegro	1–3	Northern Ireland	0–2	1–1
Bulgaria	0–7	Ukraine	0–4	0–3

=== Matches ===
23 February 2024
15:30 (16:30 EET)

Latvia	0–3	Slovakia
	Report	Škorvánková 62'; Morávková 72'; Hmírová 88' (pen.)

LNK Sporta Parks, Riga
Attendance: 207
Referee: Fabienne Michel (Germany)
27 February 2024
18:00

Slovakia	6–0	Latvia
Morávková 2'; Rybanská 6'; Lemešová 36'; Mikolajová 83'; Vredíková 87'; Kaláberová 90+4'	Report

Anton Malatinský Stadium, Trnava
Attendance: 604
Referee: Shona Shukrula (Netherlands)

Slovakia won 9–0 on aggregate, and therefore both teams remained in their respective leagues.

23 February 2024
14:00

Montenegro	0–2	Northern Ireland
	Report	Wade 70'; Vance 90+1'

Podgorica City Stadium, Podgorica
Attendance: 187
Referee: Michèle Schmölzer (Switzerland)
27 February 2024
20:00 (19:00 GMT)

Northern Ireland	1–1	Montenegro
Magill 73'	Report	Dešić 66'

Windsor Park, Belfast
Attendance: 4,085
Referee: Hristiyana Guteva (Bulgaria)

Northern Ireland won 3–1 on aggregate, and therefore both teams remained in their respective leagues.

23 February 2024
15:00 (16:00 EET)

Bulgaria	0–4	Ukraine
	Report	Kravchuk 6'; Andrukhiv 24'; Hlushchenko 82'; Kotyk 90'

Arena Arda, Kardzhali
Attendance: 459
Referee: Minka Vekkeli (Finland)
27 February 2024
14:00 (16:00 TRT)

Ukraine	3–0	Bulgaria
Ovdiychuk 15'; Hlushchenko 18'; Shmatko 81'	Report

Mardan Sports Complex, Antalya (Turkey) (Note: Due to the Russian invasion of Ukraine, Ukraine were required to play their home matches at neutral venues until further notice.)
Attendance: 100
Referee: Zuzana Valentová (Slovakia)

Ukraine won 7–0 on aggregate, and therefore both teams remained in their respective leagues.

== Goalscorers ==
There were 55 goals scored in 14 matches, for an average of 3.93 goals per match.

5 goals

- (Belgium) Tessa Wullaert

2 goals

- (Belgium) Jill Janssens
- (Belgium) Sari Kees
- (Norway) Sophie Román Haug
- (Norway) Frida Maanum
- (Slovakia) Tamara Morávková
- (Sweden) Filippa Angeldahl
- (Sweden) Pauline Hammarlund
- (Sweden) Madelen Janogy
- (Ukraine) Inna Hlushchenko

1 goal

- (Belgium) Justine Vanhaevermaet
- (Hungary) Zsanett Kaján
- (Hungary) Lilla Turányi
- (Iceland) Hlín Eiríksdóttir
- (Iceland) Sveindís Jane Jónsdóttir
- (Iceland) Bryndís Arna Níelsdóttir
- (Montenegro) Medina Dešić
- (Northern Ireland) Simone Magill
- (Northern Ireland) Demi Vance
- (Northern Ireland) Lauren Wade
- (Norway) Celin Bizet Ildhusøy
- (Norway) Caroline Graham Hansen
- (Norway) Ada Hegerberg
- (Norway) Elisabeth Terland
- (Serbia) Tijana Filipović
- (Serbia) Allegra Poljak
- (Slovakia) Patrícia Hmírová
- (Slovakia) Victoria Kaláberová
- (Slovakia) Diana Lemešová
- (Slovakia) Mária Mikolajová
- (Slovakia) Nikola Rybanská
- (Slovakia) Dominika Škorvánková
- (Slovakia) Katarína Vredíková
- (Sweden) Stina Blackstenius
- (Sweden) Rosa Kafaji
- (Sweden) Matilda Vinberg
- (Ukraine) Veronika Andrukhiv
- (Ukraine) Yana Kotyk
- (Ukraine) Roksolana Kravchuk
- (Ukraine) Olha Ovdiychuk
- (Ukraine) Lyubov Shmatko

1 own goal

- (Bosnia and Herzegovina) Jelena Gvozderac (against Sweden)
