= Victoria Kaláberová =

Slovak footballer

Personal information
- Date of birth: 7 July 2001 (age 25)
- Place of birth: New York, United States
- Position: Forward

Team information
- Current team: GKS Katowice
- Number: 21

Senior career*
Years	Team	Apps	(Gls)
2018–2020	Slovan Bratislava		
2020–2021	Real Oviedo	11	(0)
2021–2022	Aris Limassol	16	(12)
2022	Afturelding	6	(0)
2022–2023	Lakatamia	7	(0)
2023–2024	OFI	14	(5)
2024–2025	Sparta Prague	10	(1)
2025–	GKS Katowice	20	(3)

International career^{‡}
2021–	Slovakia	17	(3)
- * Club domestic league appearances and goals as of 20:18, 2 June 2026 (UTC) ‡ National team caps and goals as of 20:18, 2 June 2026 (UTC)

Victoria Kaláberová (born 7 July 2001) is a Slovak professional footballer who plays as a striker for Polish club GKS Katowice and the Slovakia national team.

== Club career ==
Kaláberová won the Slovak Women's First League twice with Slovan Bratislava before moving to Real Oviedo. After scoring seven goals in 16 league games with Aris Limassol, she transferred to Afturelding in a series of transfers that also included Greece international Maria Paterna.

On 20 July 2024, Kaláberová signed a contract with Czech Women's First League club Sparta Prague.

On 8 August 2025, Kaláberová signed a contract with Polish club GKS Katowice until the end of the 2026–27 season.

== International career ==
Kaláberová made her debut for the Slovakia national team on 13 April 2021, coming on as a substitute for Patrícia Fischerová against Slovenia.

== Personal life ==
Kaláberová was born in New York. She is a fan of Barcelona.

== Career statistics ==
=== International ===
Scores and results list Slovakia's goal tally first, score column indicates score after each Kaláberová goal.

List of international goals scored by Victoria Kaláberová
No.	Date	Venue	Opponent	Score	Result	Competition
1	27 February 2024	Anton Malatinský Stadium, Trnava, Slovakia	Latvia	6–0	6–0	2023–24 UEFA Women's Nations League
2	4 April 2025	Europa Sports Park, Europa Point, Gibraltar	Gibraltar	5–0	8–0	2025 UEFA Women's Nations League C
3	30 May 2025	Futbal Tatran Arena, Prešov, Slovakia	Gibraltar	10–0	11–0	2025 UEFA Women's Nations League

== Honours ==
GKS Katowice

- Polish Cup: 2025–26
