= 2023–24 UEFA Women's Nations League B =

Tournament details
- Dates: 22 September – 5 December 2023
- Teams: 16
- Promoted: Czech Republic; Finland; Poland; Republic of Ireland
- Relegated: Albania; Belarus; Greece; Romania; Slovenia

Tournament statistics
- Matches played: 48
- Goals scored: 128 (2.67 per match)
- Attendance: 114,203 (2,379 per match)
- Top scorer(s): (Poland) Ewa Pajor (Republic of Ireland) Kyra Carusa (Republic of Ireland) Katie McCabe (5 goals each)
- Women's European Qualifiers Women's Nations League

The 2023–24 UEFA Women's Nations League B was the second division of the 2023–24 edition of the UEFA Women's Nations League, the inaugural season of the international football competition involving the women's national teams of the member associations of UEFA. The results were used to determine the leagues for the UEFA Women's Euro 2025 qualifying competition.

== Format ==
League B consisted of 16 UEFA members ranked 17th to 32nd among competition entrants in the UEFA women's national team coefficient ranking. Teams were split into four groups of four. Each team played six matches within their group, using the home-and-away round-robin format with double matchdays in September, October and November to December 2023. The competition also acted as the first phase of the preliminary competition for UEFA Women's Euro 2025, which uses an identical league structure. The group winners were promoted to League A, while the fourth-placed team from each group, as well as the lowest-ranked third-placed team, were relegated to League C, taking effect in UEFA Women's Euro 2025 qualifying. In addition, the group runners-up of League B advanced to the promotion play-offs against the third-placed teams of League A. The winners of these home-and-away ties entered League A for UEFA Women's Euro 2025 qualifying, while the losers entered League B. Meanwhile, the three best-ranked third-placed teams in League B advanced to the relegation play-offs against the three best-ranked League C runners-up. The winners of these home-and-away ties entered League B for UEFA Women's Euro 2025 qualifying, while the losers entered League C.

== Seeding ==
Teams were allocated to League B according to their UEFA women's national team coefficient after the conclusion of the 2023 FIFA Women's World Cup qualifying group stage on 6 September 2022. Teams were split into four pots of four teams, ordered based on their UEFA national team coefficient.

The draw for the league phase took place at the UEFA headquarters in Nyon, Switzerland in May 2023, 13:00 CEST. Each group contained one team from each pot. The draw started with Pot 1 and ended with Pot 4, with drawn teams assigned to the first available group in ascending order from B1 to B4. Due to the Belarusian involvement in the Russian invasion of Ukraine, Belarus and Ukraine could not be drawn in the same group.

Pot 1
Team	Coeff	Rank
Republic of Ireland	28,877	18
Poland	28,458	19
Czech Republic	27,508	20
Finland	26,757	21

Pot 2
Team	Coeff	Rank
Serbia	26,517	22
Slovenia	26,445	23
Northern Ireland	25,711	24
Romania	24,877	25

Pot 3
Team	Coeff	Rank
Ukraine	24,359	26
Bosnia and Herzegovina	23,091	27
Slovakia	19,213	28
Hungary	18,552	29

Pot 4
Team	Coeff	Rank
Greece	17,556	30
Croatia	17,523	31
Belarus	16,890	32
Albania	16,826	33

== Groups ==
Times are CET/CEST, (Note: CEST (UTC+2) for times up to 28 October 2023, CET (UTC+1) for times from 29 October 2023.) as listed by UEFA (local times, if different, are in parentheses).

=== Group 1 ===
Pos	Team	Pld	W	D	L	GF	GA	GD	Pts	Promotion, qualification or relegation	(Republic of Ireland)	(Hungary)	(Northern Ireland)	(Albania)
1	Republic of Ireland (P)	6	6	0	0	20	2	+18	18	Promotion to League A	—	1–0	3–0	5–1
2	Hungary	6	2	2	2	11	9	+2	8	Qualification for promotion play-offs	0–4	—	3–2	6–0
3	Northern Ireland (O)	6	2	1	3	9	13	−4	7	Qualification for relegation play-offs	1–6	1–1	—	1–0
4	Albania (R)	6	0	1	5	2	18	−16	1	Relegation to League C	0–1	1–1	0–4	—

Source: UEFA
Rules for classification: Tiebreakers
(O) Play-off winners; (P) Promoted; (R) Relegated
22 September 2023
17:00

Albania	1–1	Hungary
Krasniqi 27'	Report	Fenyvesi 74'

Loro Boriçi Stadium, Shkodër
Attendance: 1,210
Referee: Veronika Kovarova (Czech Republic)
23 September 2023
14:00 (13:00 BST)

Republic of Ireland	3–0	Northern Ireland
Lu. Quinn 31'; Carusa 70'; Agg 85'	Report

Aviva Stadium, Dublin
Attendance: 35,944
Referee: Hristiyana Guteva (Bulgaria)

26 September 2023
19:30

Hungary	0–4	Republic of Ireland
	Report	Hayes 18'; McCabe 42'; Carusa 49'; O'Sullivan 70'

Hidegkuti Nándor Stadion, Budapest
Attendance: 1,513
Referee: Zuzana Valentová (Slovakia)
26 September 2023
20:00 (19:00 BST)

Northern Ireland	1–0	Albania
Wade 57'	Report

Seaview Stadium, Belfast
Attendance: 1,597
Referee: Zulema González (Spain)

27 October 2023
18:15

Hungary	3–2	Northern Ireland
Szabó 18'; Süle 83'; Németh 90+4'	Report	Hamilton 81'; Magill 89' (pen.)

Ménfői úti Stadion, Győr
Attendance: 332
Referee: Jurgita Mačikunytė (Lithuania)
27 October 2023
18:45 (17:45 BST)

Republic of Ireland	5–1	Albania
McCabe 4', 26', 81'; Carusa 56', 59'	Report	Doçi 7'

Tallaght Stadium, Dublin
Attendance: 5752
Referee: Lizzy Van Der Helm (Netherlands)

31 October 2023
18:00

Albania	0–1	Republic of Ireland
	Report	O'Sullivan 88'

Loro Boriçi Stadium, Shkodër
Attendance: 120
Referee: Araksya Saribekyan (Armenia)
31 October 2023
20:00 (19:00 GMT)

Northern Ireland	1–1	Hungary
Maxwell 80'	Report	Zeller 56'

Seaview Stadium, Belfast
Attendance: 948
Referee: Jelena Pejković (Croatia)

1 December 2023
17:00

Albania	0–4	Northern Ireland
	Report	Magill 43', 47'; Maxwell 58'; Bell 85'

Arena Kombëtare, Tirana
Attendance: 600
Referee: Minka Vekkeli (Finland)
1 December 2023
20:30 (19:30 GMT)

Republic of Ireland	1–0	Hungary
Csiszár 66' (o.g.)	Report

Tallaght Stadium, Dublin
Attendance: 6,752
Referee: Shona Shukrula (Netherlands)

5 December 2023
19:00

Hungary	6–0	Albania
Csiszár 10', 43', 81'; Kaján 11'; Turányi 18'; Zeller 88'	Report

Hidegkuti Nándor Stadion, Budapest
Attendance: 613
Referee: Karoline Wacker (Germany)
5 December 2023
19:00 (18:00 GMT)

Northern Ireland	1–6	Republic of Ireland
Beattie 75'	Report	Lu. Quinn 37'; Payne 39'; Carusa 47'; McCabe 50'; Lo. Quinn 61'; Hayes 86'

Windsor Park, Belfast
Attendance: 9,038
Referee: Veronika Kovarova (Czech Republic)

=== Group 2 ===
Pos	Team	Pld	W	D	L	GF	GA	GD	Pts	Promotion, qualification or relegation	(Finland)	(Croatia)	(Slovakia)	(Romania)
1	Finland (P)	6	5	1	0	18	2	+16	16	Promotion to League A	—	3–0	4–0	6–0
2	Croatia	6	3	0	3	5	10	−5	9	Qualification for promotion play-offs	0–2	—	2–0	2–1
3	Slovakia (O)	6	2	2	2	7	8	−1	8	Qualification for relegation play-offs	2–2	4–0	—	1–0
4	Romania (R)	6	0	1	5	1	11	−10	1	Relegation to League C	0–1	0–1	0–0	—

Source: UEFA
Rules for classification: Tiebreakers
(O) Play-off winners; (P) Promoted; (R) Relegated
22 September 2023
17:30 (18:30 EEST)

Finland	4–0	Slovakia
Sällström 5'; Rantala 23'; Kosola 45', 75'	Report

Veritas Stadion, Turku
Attendance: 5,062
Referee: Michèle Schmölzer (Switzerland)
22 September 2023
20:15

Croatia	2–1	Romania
Rudelić 45+1'; Pezelj 54'	Report	Carp 31'

Stadion Varteks, Varaždin
Attendance: 300
Referee: Maria Marotta (Italy)

26 September 2023
18:00 (19:00 EEST)

Romania	0–1	Finland
	Report	Summanen 17' (pen.)

Stadionul Arcul de Triumf, Bucharest
Attendance: 3,176
Referee: Angelika Soeder (Germany)
26 September 2023
18:00

Slovakia	4–0	Croatia
Hmírová 24', 60', 73'; Morávková 34'	Report

NTC Senec, Senec
Attendance: 536
Referee: Alexandra Collin (France)

27 October 2023
17:45 (18:45 EEST)

Finland	3–0	Croatia
Sällström 6'; Kunštek 65' (o.g.); Franssi 90+3'	Report

Bolt Arena, Helsinki
Attendance: 7,052
Referee: Désirée Grundbacher (Switzerland)
27 October 2023
18:00 (19:00 EEST)

Romania	0–0	Slovakia
	Report

Stadionul Arcul de Triumf, Bucharest
Attendance: 2,347
Referee: Eszter Urban (Hungary)

31 October 2023
15:30

Slovakia	1–0	Romania
Mikolajová 64'	Report

NTC Senec, Senec
Attendance: 419
Referee: Simona Ghisletta (Switzerland)
31 October 2023
17:00

Croatia	0–2	Finland
	Report	Summanen 5', 12'

Stadion Šubićevac, Šibenik
Attendance: 235
Referee: Teresa Oliveira (Portugal)

30 November 2023
17:45 (18:45 EET)

Finland	6–0	Romania
Sällström 30', 41'; Öling 36'; Koivisto 72'; Sevenius 84'; Hartikainen 86'	Report

Veritas Stadion, Turku
Attendance: 1,342
Referee: Elvira Nurmustafina (Kazakhstan)
1 December 2023
18:00

Croatia	2–0	Slovakia
Krajinović 53'; Dordić 60'	Report

Stadion Radnik, Velika Gorica
Attendance: 347
Referee: Hristiyana Guteva (Bulgaria)

5 December 2023
19:00 (20:00 EET)

Romania	0–1	Croatia
	Report	Rudelić 81'

Stadionul Arcul de Triumf, Bucharest
Attendance: 1,094
Referee: Rasa Grigonė (Lithuania)
5 December 2023
19:00

Slovakia	2–2	Finland
Lemešová 32'; Mikolajová 61'	Report	Pikkujämsä 2'; Peuhkurinen 70'

Anton Malatinský Stadium, Trnava
Attendance: 274
Referee: Deborah Bianchi (Italy)

=== Group 3 ===
Pos	Team	Pld	W	D	L	GF	GA	GD	Pts	Promotion, qualification or relegation	(Poland)	(Serbia)	(Ukraine)	(Greece)
1	Poland (P)	6	5	1	0	11	4	+7	16	Promotion to League A	—	2–1	2–1	2–0
2	Serbia	6	3	1	2	10	5	+5	10	Qualification for promotion play-offs	1–1	—	0–1	4–0
3	Ukraine (O)	6	2	0	4	5	7	−2	6	Qualification for relegation play-offs	0–1	1–2	—	1–0
4	Greece (R)	6	1	0	5	3	13	−10	3	Relegation to League C	1–3	0–2	2–1	—

Source: UEFA
Rules for classification: Tiebreakers
(O) Play-off winners; (P) Promoted; (R) Relegated
22 September 2023
15:00

Ukraine	1–2	Serbia
Ovdiychuk 20'	Report	Čanković 64'; Damjanović 79'

Stadion Miejski im. Kazimierza Deyny, Starogard Gdański (Poland) (Note: Due to the Russian invasion of Ukraine, Ukraine are required to play their home matches at neutral venues until further notice.)
Attendance: 173
Referee: Catarina Campos (Portugal)
22 September 2023
19:00 (20:00 EEST)

Greece	1–3	Poland
Markou 24'	Report	Pajor 1'; Padilla 40'; Pawollek 84'

Georgios Kamaras Stadium, Athens
Attendance: 262
Referee: Réka Molnar (Hungary)

26 September 2023
18:00

Poland	2–1	Ukraine
Pajor 22', 67'	Report	Shmatko 80'

Stadion Miejski w Gdyni, Gdynia
Attendance: 4,962
Referee: Elvira Nurmustafina (Kazakhstan)
26 September 2023
19:00

Serbia	4–0	Greece
Ivanović 16', 44'; Damnjanović 32', 52'	Report

Sportski centar FSS, Stara Pazova
Attendance: 800
Referee: Désirée Grundbacher (Switzerland)

27 October 2023
16:00 (17:00 EEST)

Greece	2–1	Ukraine
Markou 36'; Spyridonidou 72'	Report	Kalinina 3'

Theodoros Vardinogiannis Stadium, Heraklion
Attendance: 2,500
Referee: Jana Van Laere (Belgium)
27 October 2023
17:45

Poland	2–1	Serbia
Frajtović 17' (o.g.); Pajor 42'	Report	Damnjanović 76'

Stadion Miejski, Tychy
Attendance: 3,840
Referee: Zuzana Valentová (Slovakia)

31 October 2023
16:00 (17:00 EET)

Ukraine	1–0	Greece
Apanashchenko 32'	Report

Theodoros Vardinogiannis Stadium, Heraklion (Greece)
Attendance: 2,001
Referee: Veronika Kovarova (Czech Republic)
31 October 2023
19:00

Serbia	1–1	Poland
Blagojević 52'	Report	Padilla 43'

Sportski centar FSS, Stara Pazova
Attendance: 823
Referee: Galiya Echeva (Bulgaria)

1 December 2023
16:00 (17:00 EET)

Greece	0–2	Serbia
	Report	Mijatović 45'; Poljak 89'

Theodoros Vardinogiannis Stadium, Heraklion
Attendance: 1,050
Referee: Gamze Durmuş (Turkey)
1 December 2023
18:00

Ukraine	0–1	Poland
	Report	Achcińska 10'

Subcarpathian Football Center, Stalowa Wola (Poland)
Attendance: 1,944
Referee: Ana Maria Terteleac (Romania)

5 December 2023
19:00

Poland	2–0	Greece
Pajor 37'; Kozak 59'	Report

Zagłębie Sports Park, Sosnowiec
Attendance: 3,694
Referee: Jelena Pejković (Croatia)
5 December 2023
19:00

Serbia	0–1	Ukraine
	Report	Hiryn 55'

Sportski centar FSS, Stara Pazova
Attendance: 500
Referee: Katalin Sipos (Hungary)

=== Group 4 ===
Pos	Team	Pld	W	D	L	GF	GA	GD	Pts	Promotion, qualification or relegation	(Czech Republic)	(Bosnia and Herzegovina)	(Slovenia)	(Belarus)
1	Czech Republic (P)	6	4	1	1	11	4	+7	13	Promotion to League A	—	2–2	4–0	2–1
2	Bosnia and Herzegovina	6	3	2	1	8	6	+2	11	Qualification for promotion play-offs	1–0	—	1–1	1–0
3	Slovenia (R)	6	1	3	2	4	9	−5	6	Relegation to League C	0–2	2–1	—	0–0
4	Belarus (R)	6	0	2	4	3	7	−4	2	Relegation to League C	0–1	1–2	1–1	—

Source: UEFA
Rules for classification: Tiebreakers
(P) Promoted; (R) Relegated
22 September 2023
16:00

Slovenia	0–2	Czech Republic
	Report	Pochmanová 38'; Cahynová 86'

Matija Gubec Stadium, Krško
Attendance: 233
Referee: Jelena Pejković (Croatia)
22 September 2023
21:00

Belarus	1–2	Bosnia and Herzegovina
Linnik 14'	Report	Jelčić 6'; Gavrić 87'

Ménfői úti Stadion, Győr (Hungary) (Note: Due to the country's involvement in the Russian invasion of Ukraine, Belarus was required to play its home matches at neutral venues behind closed doors until further notice.)
Attendance: 0
Referee: Abigail Byrne (England)

26 September 2023
16:00

Bosnia and Herzegovina	1–1	Slovenia
Nikolić 40'	Report	Zver 59'

Bosnia and Herzegovina FA Training Centre, Zenica
Attendance: 598
Referee: Rasa Grigonė (Lithuania)
26 September 2023
17:00

Czech Republic	2–1	Belarus
Kotrčová 28'; Cahynová 33'	Report	Valiuk 55'

Gradski stadion, Velika Gorica (Croatia) (Note: Due to the country's involvement in the Russian invasion of Ukraine, Belarus were not allowed to enter Czech Republic by local authorities. As a result, the match was played at a neutral venue.)
Attendance: 0
Referee: Reelika Turi (Estonia)

27 October 2023
14:30

Bosnia and Herzegovina	1–0	Czech Republic
Krajnić 88'	Report

Bosnia and Herzegovina FA Training Centre, Zenica
Attendance: 230
Referee: Anastasia Mylopoulou (Greece)
27 October 2023
20:00

Belarus	1–1	Slovenia
Linnik 90+3'	Report	Kubichnaya 16' (o.g.)

Szusza Ferenc Stadion, Budapest (Hungary)
Attendance: 0
Referee: Elvira Nurmustafina (Kazakhstan)

31 October 2023
17:00

Czech Republic	2–2	Bosnia and Herzegovina
Dubcová 31'; Černá 67'	Report	Nikolić 6', 51'

Malšovická aréna, Hradec Králové
Attendance: 7,488
Referee: Maria Marotta (Italy)
31 October 2023
17:30

Slovenia	0–0	Belarus
	Report

Fazanerija City Stadium, Murska Sobota
Attendance: 342
Referee: Kirsty Dowle (England)

1 December 2023
18:00

Slovenia	2–1	Bosnia and Herzegovina
Kuštrin 74', 77'	Report	Jelčić 19'

Bonifika Stadium, Koper
Attendance: 488
Referee: Lizzy Van Der Helm (Netherlands)
2 December 2023
11:30

Belarus	0–1	Czech Republic
	Report	Dubcová 45'

Ménfői úti Stadion, Győr (Hungary)
Attendance: 0
Referee: Jelena Medjedovic (Serbia)

5 December 2023
19:00

Bosnia and Herzegovina	1–0	Belarus
Gačanica 17'	Report

Bilino Polje Stadium, Zenica
Attendance: 423
Referee: Deborah Anex (Switzerland)
5 December 2023
19:00

Czech Republic	4–0	Slovenia
Dubcová 12'; Černá 30'; Stašková 59'; Khýrová 69'	Report

CFIG Arena, Pardubice
Attendance: 1,001
Referee: Emanuela Rusta (Albania)

== Ranking of third-placed teams ==
Pos	Grp	Team	Pld	W	D	L	GF	GA	GD	Pts	Qualification or relegation
1	B2	Slovakia	6	2	2	2	7	8	−1	8	Qualification for relegation play-offs
2	B1	Northern Ireland	6	2	1	3	9	13	−4	7	Qualification for relegation play-offs
3	B3	Ukraine	6	2	0	4	5	7	−2	6	Qualification for relegation play-offs
4	B4	Slovenia	6	1	3	2	4	9	−5	6	Relegation to League C

Source: UEFA
Rules for classification: 1) Points; 2) Goal difference; 3) Goals scored; 4) Away goals scored; 5) Wins; 6) Away wins; 7) Disciplinary points; 8) UEFA national team coefficient.

== League ranking ==
The 16 League B teams were ranked 17th to 32nd overall in the 2023–24 UEFA Women's Nations League according to the following rules:

- The teams finishing first in their groups were ranked 17th to 20th according to the results of the league phase.
- The teams finishing second in their groups were ranked 21st to 24th according to the results of the league phase.
- The teams finishing third in their groups were ranked 25th to 28th according to the results of the league phase.
- The teams finishing fourth in their groups were ranked 29th to 32nd according to the results of the league phase.

Rnk	Grp	Team	Pld	W	D	L	GF	GA	GD	Pts	Promotion or relegation
17	B1	Republic of Ireland	6	6	0	0	20	2	+18	18	Promotion to League A
18	B2	Finland	6	5	1	0	18	2	+16	16	Promotion to League A
19	B3	Poland	6	5	1	0	11	4	+7	16	Promotion to League A
20	B4	Czech Republic	6	4	1	1	11	4	+7	13	Promotion to League A
21	B4	Bosnia and Herzegovina	6	3	2	1	8	6	+2	11	Qualification for promotion play-offs
22	B3	Serbia	6	3	1	2	10	5	+5	10	Qualification for promotion play-offs
23	B2	Croatia	6	3	0	3	5	10	−5	9	Qualification for promotion play-offs
24	B1	Hungary	6	2	2	2	11	9	+2	8	Qualification for promotion play-offs
25	B2	Slovakia	6	2	2	2	7	8	−1	8	Qualification for relegation play-offs
26	B1	Northern Ireland	6	2	1	3	9	13	−4	7	Qualification for relegation play-offs
27	B3	Ukraine	6	2	0	4	5	7	−2	6	Qualification for relegation play-offs
28	B4	Slovenia	6	1	3	2	4	9	−5	6	Relegation to League C
29	B3	Greece	6	1	0	5	3	13	−10	3	Relegation to League C
30	B4	Belarus	6	0	2	4	3	7	−4	2	Relegation to League C
31	B2	Romania	6	0	1	5	1	11	−10	1	Relegation to League C
32	B1	Albania	6	0	1	5	2	18	−16	1	Relegation to League C

Source: UEFA
Rules for classification: Ranking criteria

== Goalscorers ==
There were 128 goals scored in 48 matches, for an average of 2.67 goals per match.

5 goals

- (Poland) Ewa Pajor
- (Republic of Ireland) Kyra Carusa
- (Republic of Ireland) Katie McCabe

4 goals

- (Finland) Linda Sällström

3 goals

- (Bosnia and Herzegovina) Milena Nikolić
- (Czech Republic) Kamila Dubcová
- (Finland) Eveliina Summanen
- (Hungary) Henrietta Csiszár
- (Northern Ireland) Simone Magill
- (Serbia) Jovana Damnjanović
- (Slovakia) Patrícia Hmírová

2 goals

- (Belarus) Anastasia Linnik
- (Bosnia and Herzegovina) Maja Jelčić
- (Croatia) Ivana Rudelić
- (Czech Republic) Klára Cahynová
- (Czech Republic) Franny Černá
- (Finland) Katariina Kosola
- (Greece) Eleni Markou
- (Hungary) Dóra Zeller
- (Northern Ireland) Danielle Maxwell
- (Poland) Natalia Padilla
- (Republic of Ireland) Caitlin Hayes
- (Republic of Ireland) Denise O'Sullivan
- (Republic of Ireland) Lucy Quinn
- (Serbia) Miljana Ivanović
- (Slovakia) Mária Mikolajová
- (Slovenia) Zala Kuštrin

1 goal

- (Albania) Megi Doçi
- (Albania) Qendresa Krasniqi
- (Belarus) Viktoryia Valiuk
- (Bosnia and Herzegovina) Minela Gačanica
- (Bosnia and Herzegovina) Andrea Gavrić
- (Bosnia and Herzegovina) Alma Krajnić
- (Croatia) Jelena Dordić
- (Croatia) Ružica Krajinović
- (Croatia) Petra Pezelj
- (Czech Republic) Michaela Khýrová
- (Czech Republic) Kateřina Kotrčová
- (Czech Republic) Aneta Pochmanová
- (Czech Republic) Andrea Stašková
- (Finland) Sanni Franssi
- (Finland) Anni Hartikainen
- (Finland) Emma Koivisto
- (Finland) Ria Öling
- (Finland) Emma Peuhkurinen
- (Finland) Elli Pikkujämsä
- (Finland) Jutta Rantala
- (Finland) Oona Sevenius
- (Greece) Anastasia Spyridonidou
- (Hungary) Evelin Fenyvesi
- (Hungary) Zsanett Kaján
- (Hungary) Hanna Németh
- (Hungary) Dóra Süle
- (Hungary) Viktória Szabó
- (Hungary) Lilla Turányi
- (Northern Ireland) Kerry Beattie
- (Northern Ireland) Megan Bell
- (Northern Ireland) Caragh Hamilton
- (Northern Ireland) Lauren Wade
- (Poland) Adriana Achcińska
- (Poland) Kinga Kozak
- (Poland) Tanja Pawollek
- (Republic of Ireland) Lily Agg
- (Republic of Ireland) Heather Payne
- (Republic of Ireland) Louise Quinn
- (Romania) Cristina Carp
- (Serbia) Dina Blagojević
- (Serbia) Jelena Čanković
- (Serbia) Nevena Damjanović
- (Serbia) Milica Mijatović
- (Serbia) Allegra Poljak
- (Slovakia) Diana Lemešová
- (Slovakia) Tamara Morávková
- (Slovenia) Mateja Zver
- (Ukraine) Daryna Apanashchenko
- (Ukraine) Viktoriya Hiryn
- (Ukraine) Yana Kalinina
- (Ukraine) Olha Ovdiychuk
- (Ukraine) Lyubov Shmatko

1 own goal

- (Belarus) Ksenia Kubichnaya (against Slovenia)
- (Croatia) Maria Kunštek (against Finland)
- (Hungary) Henrietta Csiszár (against Republic of Ireland)
- (Serbia) Anđela Frajtović (against Poland)
