= 2025 UEFA Women's Nations League C =

Tournament details
- Dates: League phase: 21 February – 3 June 2025; Promotion/relegation matches: 24–28 October 2025
- Teams: 21
- Promoted: Israel; Latvia; Luxembourg; Malta; Montenegro; Slovakia

Tournament statistics
- Matches played: 54
- Goals scored: 176 (3.26 per match)
- Attendance: 27,728 (513 per match)
- Top scorer(s): (Luxembourg) Amy Thompson (Slovakia) Tamara Morávková (6 goals each)
- Women's European Qualifiers Women's Nations League

League C was the third and lowest division of the 2025 UEFA Women's Nations League, the second season of the international football competition involving the women's national teams of the member associations of UEFA. The results were also used to determine the leagues for the European qualifying competition for the 2027 FIFA Women's World Cup.

== Format ==
League C consisted of the teams ranked 33rd and lower, according to the Women’s European Qualifiers overall phase rankings (based on the Women's Euro 2025 qualifying overall ranking, taking into consideration promotion/relegation at the conclusion of that competition), split into three groups of four teams and three groups of three teams. Each team played a total of six matches if in a four-team group, or four matches if in a three-team group, against other members of the same group using the home-and-away round-robin format with double matchdays in February, April, and May/June 2025.

The competition also acted as the first phase of the qualifying competition for the 2027 FIFA Women's World Cup, which used an identical league structure. The six group winners were promoted to League B for the 2027 Women's World Cup qualifying competition. In addition, the two best-ranked runners-up of League C advanced to the promotion play-offs against the two best-ranked third-placed teams of League B. The winners of the home-and-away ties entered League B for the 2027 Women's World Cup qualifying competition, while the losers entered League C.

== Seeding ==
Teams were allocated to League C according to the Women’s European Qualifiers overall phase rankings, and were seeded into three pots of six teams and one pot of three teams, based on the same ranking.

Gibraltar and Liechtenstein entered the tournament for the first time, having not entered in the previous edition. This was both women's teams' first official competitive international tournament.

The draw for the league phase took place at the UEFA headquarters in Nyon, Switzerland on 7 November 2024 at 13:00 CET. For political reasons Armenia and Azerbaijan could not be drawn in the same group. Due to excessive travel restrictions, Kazakhstan could not be drawn into a group containing more than one of Andorra, Faroe Islands, Gibraltar, or Malta.

Pot 1
Team	Rank
Slovakia	33
Azerbaijan	34
Malta	35
Israel	36
Kosovo	37
Luxembourg	38

Pot 2
Team	Rank
Montenegro	39
Georgia	40
Bulgaria	41
Latvia	42
Faroe Islands	43
Armenia	44

Pot 3
Team	Rank
North Macedonia	45
Estonia	46
Lithuania	47
Kazakhstan	48
Moldova	49
Cyprus	50

Pot 4
Team	Rank
Andorra	51
Gibraltar	52
Liechtenstein	53

== Groups ==
Times are CET (up to 29 March 2025) and CEST (from 30 March 2025) as listed by UEFA. Local times, if different, are in parentheses.

=== Group 1 ===
Pos	Team	Pld	W	D	L	GF	GA	GD	Pts	Promotion or qualification	(Slovakia)	(Faroe Islands)	(Moldova)	(Gibraltar)
1	Slovakia (P)	6	6	0	0	27	1	+26	18	Promotion to League B	—	3–0	1–0	11–0
2	Faroe Islands	6	3	1	2	10	6	+4	10		1–2	—	2–0	5–0
3	Moldova	6	2	1	3	6	6	0	7		0–2	1–1	—	1–0
4	Gibraltar	6	0	0	6	0	30	−30	0		0–8	0–1	0–4	—

Source: UEFA
Rules for classification: Tiebreakers
(P) Promoted
21 February
14:00

Moldova	1–0	Gibraltar
Țabur 90+3'	Report

Nisporeni Central Stadium, Nisporeni
Attendance: 123
Referee: Sofiya Prychyna (Ukraine)
21 February
19:00

Slovakia	3–0	Faroe Islands
Hmírová 20'; Morávková 29'; Fabová 60'	Report

Anton Malatinský Stadium, Trnava
Attendance: 309
Referee: Anastasia Mylopoulou (Greece)

25 February
19:00

Gibraltar	0–1	Faroe Islands
	Report	Sevdal 70'

Europa Sports Park, Gibraltar
Attendance: 626
Referee: Melek Dakan (Turkey)
25 February
17:30

Slovakia	1–0	Moldova
Škorvánková 85'	Report

Anton Malatinský Stadium, Trnava
Attendance: 359
Referee: Jelena Međedović (Serbia)

4 April
18:00 (17:00 WEST)

Faroe Islands	2–0	Moldova
Hummeland 47'; Sevdal 75'	Report

Tórsvøllur, Torshavn
Attendance: 521
Referee: Lovisa Johansson (Sweden)
4 April
19:00

Gibraltar	0–8	Slovakia
	Report	Morávková 10', 38', 77' (pen.), 80'; Fabová 25', 48'; Kaláberová 60'; Rybanská 72'

Europa Sports Park, Gibraltar
Attendance: 583
Referee: Kristina Georgieva (Bulgaria)

8 April

Faroe Islands	5–0	Gibraltar
Klakstein 20'; Tórolvsdóttir 27'; Sevdal 58'; Johannesen 88', 90+3'	Report

Tórsvøllur, Torshavn
Attendance: 528
Referee: Teresa Oliveira (Portugal)
8 April
16:00

Moldova	0–2	Slovakia
	Report	Bayerová 4'; Rybanská 86'

Zimbru Stadium, Chișinău
Attendance: 870
Referee: Aleksandra Česen (Slovenia)

30 May
19:00

Moldova	1–1	Faroe Islands
Colnic 37'	Report	Johannesen 23'

Zimbru Stadium, Chișinău
Attendance: 568
Referee: Jelena Međedović (Serbia)
30 May
17:00

Slovakia	11–0	Gibraltar
Rybanská 2', 77', 90'; Hmírová 17', 44'; Bayerová 20'; Maťavková 31'; Mikolajová 52', 54'; Morávková 86'; Kaláberová 88'	Report

Futbal Tatran Arena, Prešov
Attendance: 3,814
Referee: Eirini Pingiou (Greece)

3 June
19:00

Faroe Islands	1–2	Slovakia
Johannesen 35'	Report	Hmírová 11'; Maťavková 88'

Tórsvøllur, Tórshavn
Attendance: 606
Referee: Emily Heaslip (England)
3 June
19:00

Gibraltar	0–4	Moldova
	Report	Chiper 21', 32'; Coceanovschi 39'; Gilbert 44' (o.g.)

Europa Sports Park, Gibraltar
Attendance: 405
Referee: Tjaša Misja (Slovenia)

=== Group 2 ===
Pos	Team	Pld	W	D	L	GF	GA	GD	Pts	Promotion or qualification	(Malta)	(Cyprus)	(Georgia (country))	(Andorra)
1	Malta (P)	6	4	1	1	8	5	+3	13	Promotion to League B	—	1–0	2–1	1–0
2	Cyprus	6	3	1	2	9	8	+1	10	Qualification for promotion play-offs	2–1	—	2–1	2–2
3	Georgia	6	2	0	4	9	11	−2	6		2–3	1–2	—	2–1
4	Andorra	6	1	2	3	6	8	−2	5		0–0	2–1	1–2	—

Source: UEFA
Rules for classification: Tiebreakers
(P) Promoted
21 February
18:00 (19:00 EEST)

Cyprus	2–1	Malta
Violari 33'; Constantinou 37'	Report	Papadopoulou 51' (o.g.)

AEK Arena, Larnaca
Attendance: 180
Referee: Emily Heaslip (England)
21 February
16:00 (19:00 GET)

Georgia	2–1	Andorra
Bebia 84' (pen.); Bakradze 87'	Report	Solé Palau 69'

Mikheil Meskhi Stadium, Tbilisi
Attendance: 850
Referee: Ugne Šmitaite (Lithuania)

25 February
18:00 (19:00 EET)

Cyprus	2–1	Georgia
Violari 1', 28'	Report	Danelia 44'

AEK Arena, Larnaca
Attendance: 220
Referee: Jelena Kumer (Croatia)
25 February
19:30

Malta	1–0	Andorra
Zammit 11'	Report

Centenary Stadium, Ta' Qali
Attendance: 612
Referee: Teresa Oliveira (Portugal)

4 April
17:00 (19:00 GET)

Georgia	2–3	Malta
Bakradze 59'; Danelia 90+6' (pen.)	Report	Farrugia 27', 44'; Bugeja 30'

Mikheil Meskhi Stadium, Tbilisi
Attendance: 853
Referee: Elvira Nurmustafina (Kazakhstan)
4 April
18:00 (19:00 EEST)

Cyprus	2–2	Andorra
Violari 11'; Michail 72'	Report	Morató 7', 83'

Dasaki Stadium, Achnas
Attendance: 180
Referee: Eszter Urban (Hungary)

8 April
20:00

Andorra	2–1	Cyprus
Morató 84', 90+2' (pen.)	Report	Aristodimou 30'

Estadi Nacional, Andorra la Vella
Attendance: 407
Referee: Araksya Saribekyan (Armenia)
8 April
19:00

Malta	2–1	Georgia
Cuschieri 39'; Bugeja 60' (pen.)	Report	Kalandadze 84'

Centenary Stadium, Ta' Qali
Attendance: 620
Referee: Cansu Tryak (Türkiye)

30 May
19:00

Andorra	1–2	Georgia
Ber 17'	Report	Ambalia 12'; Mtskerashvili 28'

Estadi de la FAF, Encamp
Attendance: 513
Referee: Vesna Miletić (Bosnia and Herzegovina)
30 May
19:00

Malta	1–0	Cyprus
Bugeja 42'	Report

National Stadium, Ta' Qali
Attendance: 1,205
Referee: Sabina Bolić (Croatia)

3 June
19:00

Andorra	0–0	Malta
	Report

Estadi de la FAF, Encamp
Attendance: 470
Referee: Satu Miettunen (Finland)
3 June
19:00 (21:00 GET)

Georgia	1–2	Cyprus
Bebia 54'	Report	Hardy 27'; Violari 49'

Mikheil Meskhi Stadium, Tbilisi
Attendance: 627
Referee: Martina Molinaro (Italy)

=== Group 3 ===
Pos	Team	Pld	W	D	L	GF	GA	GD	Pts	Promotion or qualification	(Luxembourg)	(Kazakhstan)	(Armenia)	(Liechtenstein)
1	Luxembourg (P)	6	5	1	0	20	6	+14	16	Promotion to League B	—	2–2	2–0	7–0
2	Kazakhstan	6	3	1	2	14	9	+5	10		1–3	—	3–2	4–0
3	Armenia	6	2	1	3	13	11	+2	7		1–3	2–0	—	6–1
4	Liechtenstein	6	0	1	5	5	26	−21	1		2–3	0–4	2–2	—

Source: UEFA
Rules for classification: Tiebreakers
(P) Promoted
21 February
11:30 (14:30 AMT)

Armenia	6–1	Liechtenstein
Artin 7'; Pizlova 13'; Kazanchian 44', 53', 71'; Dallakyan 51' (pen.)	Report	Risch 52'

Hakob Tonoyan Stadium, Armavir
Attendance: 80
Referee: Tjaša Misja (Slovenia)
21 February
19:30

Luxembourg	2–2	Kazakhstan
Estévez García 50' (pen.); Miller 73'	Report	Nizamutdinova 34', 41'

Stade Émile Mayrisch, Esch-sur-Alzette
Attendance: 530
Referee: Rita Vehapi (Kosovo)

25 February
11:30 (14:30 AMT)

Armenia	2–0	Kazakhstan
Karazgezian 15'; Pizlova 56' (pen.)	Report

Hakob Tonoyan Stadium, Armavir
Attendance: 90
Referee: Oxana Cruc (Moldova)
25 February
19:30

Luxembourg	7–0	Liechtenstein
Jorge 16', 39'; Thompson 44'; Estévez García 48' (pen.); Barbosa Abreu 68'; Miller 75'; C. Schmit 87'	Report

Stade Émile Mayrisch, Esch-sur-Alzette
Attendance: 394
Referee: Jeļena Jermolajeva (Latvia)

4 April
13:00 (15:00 AMT)

Armenia	1–3	Luxembourg
Karagezian 30'	Report	Thompson 4', 50'; C. Schmit 20'

Yerevan Football Academy Stadium, Yerevan
Attendance: 200
Referee: Melissa Burgin (England)
4 April
17:30

Liechtenstein	0–4	Kazakhstan
	Report	Nurusheva 5', 36' (pen.); Berikova 26'; Bibossynova 90+4'

Sportpark Eschen-Mauren, Eschen
Attendance: 412
Referee: Mariia Glekova (Israel)

8 April
15:00

Kazakhstan	3–2	Armenia
Bibossynova 48', 55'; Aitymova 71'	Report	Davtyan 63', 66'

Astana Arena, Astana
Attendance: 300
Referee: Sabina Bolić (Croatia)
8 April
17:30

Liechtenstein	2–3	Luxembourg
Risch 31'; Kindle 61'	Report	Thompson 11', 14'; Jorge 77'

Sportpark Eschen-Mauren, Eschen
Attendance: 384
Referee: Anastasiya Romanyuk (Ukraine)

30 May
14:00

Kazakhstan	4–0	Liechtenstein
Berikova 44', 55'; Turlybekova 46'; Zhanatayeva 57'	Report

Almaty Central Stadium, Almaty
Attendance: 282
Referee: Anna Adamska (Poland)
30 May
19:00

Luxembourg	2–0	Armenia
Thompson 14'; Lourenco Magalhães 36'	Report

Stade rue Henri Dunant, Beggen
Attendance: 1,156
Referee: Frederikke Lydia Søkjær (Denmark)

3 June
19:00

Kazakhstan	1–3	Luxembourg
Zhumabaikyzy 15'	Report	Miller 51'; Dos Santos 59'; Miny 90+3'

Almaty Central Stadium, Almaty
Attendance: 342
Referee: Victoria Beyer (France)
3 June
19:00

Liechtenstein	2–2	Armenia
Hürlimann 5'; Göppel 61'	Report	Dallakyan 10'; Davtyan 89'

Sportpark Eschen-Mauren, Eschen
Attendance: 423
Referee: Abbie Hendry (Scotland)

=== Group 4 ===
Pos	Team	Pld	W	D	L	GF	GA	GD	Pts	Promotion or qualification	(Montenegro)	(Azerbaijan)	(Lithuania)
1	Montenegro (P)	4	2	2	0	5	2	+3	8	Promotion to League B	—	1–1	3–1
2	Azerbaijan	4	1	2	1	3	6	−3	5		0–0	—	0–5
3	Lithuania	4	1	0	3	6	6	0	3		0–1	0–2	—

Source: UEFA
Rules for classification: Tiebreakers
(P) Promoted
21 February
12:00 (15:00 AZT)

Azerbaijan	0–0	Montenegro
	Report

Dalga Arena, Baku
Attendance: 40
Referee: Tatyana Sorokopudova (Kazakhstan)

25 February
14:00

Montenegro	3–1	Lithuania
Kuč 2', 37', 57'	Report	Galkina 29'

Gradski Stadion, Nikšić
Attendance: 200
Referee: Mzevinari Sharashanidze (Georgia)

4 April
17:30 (18:30 EEST)

Lithuania	0–2	Azerbaijan
	Report	Manya 20'; Mirzaliyeva 55'

LFF Stadium, Vilnius
Attendance: 447
Referee: Marina Zechner (Austria)

8 April
18:00

Montenegro	1–1	Azerbaijan
Đoković 90+2' (pen.)	Report	Mollayeva 54'

Gradski Stadion, Nikšić
Attendance: 200
Referee: Marta San Juan (Andorra)

30 May
16:00

Azerbaijan	0–5	Lithuania
	Report	Jonusaite 3', 30'; Griksaite 10'; Lazdauskaite 42'; Romanovskaja 48'

Bayil Arena, Baku
Attendance: 2,500
Referee: Sapir Gaya Berman (Israel)

3 June
19:00

Lithuania	0–1	Montenegro
	Report	Dešić 67'

LSC Druskininkai Stadium, Druskininkai
Attendance: 783
Referee: Liudmyla Telbukh (Ukraine)

=== Group 5 ===
Pos	Team	Pld	W	D	L	GF	GA	GD	Pts	Promotion or qualification	(Israel)	(Estonia)	(Bulgaria)
1	Israel (P)	4	3	1	0	12	5	+7	10	Promotion to League B	—	3–1	3–3
2	Estonia	4	1	1	2	2	6	−4	4		0–3	—	0–0
3	Bulgaria	4	0	2	2	4	7	−3	2		1–3	0–1	—

Source: UEFA
Rules for classification: Tiebreakers
(P) Promoted
21 February
13:30

Bulgaria	1–3	Israel
Petrova 36'	Report (UEFA); Report (Sport5)	Awad 39'; Sommer 40'; Avital 63'

Stadion Aleksandar Shalamanov, Sofia
Attendance: 177
Referee: Milica Milovanović (Serbia)

25 February
14:30

Israel	3–1	Estonia
Selimhodzic 35'; Beard 48'; Kuznetzov 80'	Report	Kirpu 78'

Alcufer Stadion, Győr (Hungary) (Note: Due to the Gaza war, Israel were required to play their home matches at neutral venues.)
Attendance: 0
Referee: Briet Bragadottir (Iceland)

4 April
18:00 (19:00 EEST)

Estonia	0–0	Bulgaria
	Report

Lilleküla Stadium, Tallinn
Attendance: 457
Referee: Stacey Pearson (England)

8 April
13:00

Israel	3–3	Bulgaria
Avital 18'; Sommer 41', 45+4'	Report	Ivanova 12'; Rasina 15'; Boycheva 50'

Budaörs Stadion, Budaörs (Hungary)
Attendance: 0
Referee: Sara Telek (Austria)

30 May
17:00

Estonia	0–3	Israel
	Report	Selimhodzic 39'; Cohen 75'; Ben Israel 90+5'

Kadriorg Stadium, Tallinn
Attendance: 583
Referee: Charlotte Carpenter (Wales)

3 June
19:00

Bulgaria	0–1	Estonia
	Report	Teern 90+1'

Stadion Aleksandar Shalamanov, Sofia
Attendance: 470
Referee: Ioanna Allayiotou (Cyprus)

=== Group 6 ===
Pos	Team	Pld	W	D	L	GF	GA	GD	Pts	Promotion or qualification	(Latvia)	(Kosovo)	(North Macedonia)
1	Latvia (P)	4	2	2	0	6	4	+2	8	Promotion to League B	—	2–2	1–1
2	Kosovo	4	2	1	1	9	3	+6	7	Qualification for promotion play-offs	0–1	—	3–0
3	North Macedonia	4	0	1	3	2	10	−8	1		1–2	0–4	—

Source: UEFA
Rules for classification: Tiebreakers
(P) Promoted
21 February
14:00

North Macedonia	0–4	Kosovo
	Report	Biqkaj 6', 49'; Fetaj 65'; Metaj 67'

Petar Miloševski Training Centre, Skopje
Attendance: 197
Referee: Emilie Torkelsen (Norway)

25 February
14:00

Kosovo	0–1	Latvia
	Report	Zaičikova 51'

Fadil Vokrri Stadium, Pristina
Attendance: 110
Referee: Maïka Vanderstichel (France)

4 April
15:00

North Macedonia	1–2	Latvia
Maksuti 31'	Report	Miksone 2', 81'

Petar Miloševski Training Centre, Skopje
Attendance: 100
Referee: Hanna Laajanen (Sweden)

8 April
15:00

Kosovo	3–0	North Macedonia
Biqkaj 50', 66'; Memeti 85'	Report

Fadil Vokrri Stadium, Pristina
Attendance: 100
Referee: Jurgita Mačikunytė (Lithuania)

30 May
18:00

Latvia	1–1	North Macedonia
Ševcova 65'	Report	Meijer 16'

LNK Sporta Parks, Riga
Attendance: 321
Referee: Mzevinari Sharashanidze (Georgia)

3 June
19:00

Latvia	2–2	Kosovo
Tahiri 17' (o.g.); Miksone 45+2' (pen.)	Report	Smaili 20'; Memeti 31'

LNK Sporta Parks, Riga
Attendance: 401
Referee: Elisabet Calvo Valentín (Spain)

== Ranking of second-placed teams ==
Due to differing group sizes in League C, results against fourth-placed teams are not considered when comparing second-placed teams.

Pos	Grp	Team	Pld	W	D	L	GF	GA	GD	Pts	Qualification
1	C2	Cyprus	4	3	0	1	6	4	+2	9	Qualification for promotion play-offs
2	C6	Kosovo	4	2	1	1	9	3	+6	7	Qualification for promotion play-offs
3	C4	Azerbaijan	4	1	2	1	3	6	−3	5	
4	C1	Faroe Islands	4	1	1	2	4	6	−2	4	
5	C3	Kazakhstan	4	1	1	2	6	9	−3	4	
6	C5	Estonia	4	1	1	2	2	6	−4	4	

Source: UEFA
Rules for classification: Tiebreakers

== League ranking ==
The 21 League C teams are ranked 33rd to 53rd overall in the 2025 Women's Nations League, according to the criteria for league ranking.

Due to differing group sizes in League C, results against fourth-placed teams are not considered when comparing teams placed first, second, and third in their respective groups.

Rnk	Grp	Team	Pld	W	D	L	GF	GA	GD	Pts	PT
33	C1	Slovakia	4	4	0	0	8	1	+7	12	Promotion to League B
34	C5	Israel	4	3	1	0	12	5	+7	10	Promotion to League B
35	C3	Luxembourg	4	3	1	0	10	4	+6	10	Promotion to League B
36	C2	Malta	4	3	0	1	7	5	+2	9	Promotion to League B
37	C4	Montenegro	4	2	2	0	5	2	+3	8	Promotion to League B
38	C6	Latvia	4	2	2	0	6	4	+2	8	Promotion to League B
39	C2	Cyprus	4	3	0	1	6	4	+2	9	Promotion playoff for League B
40	C6	Kosovo	4	2	1	1	9	3	+6	7	Promotion playoff for League B
41	C4	Azerbaijan	4	1	2	1	3	6	−3	5	
42	C1	Faroe Islands	4	1	1	2	4	6	−2	4	
43	C3	Kazakhstan	4	1	1	2	6	9	−3	4	
44	C5	Estonia	4	1	1	2	2	6	−4	4	
45	C4	Lithuania	4	1	0	3	6	6	0	3	
46	C3	Armenia	4	1	0	3	5	8	−3	3	
47	C5	Bulgaria	4	0	2	2	4	7	−3	2	
48	C1	Moldova	4	0	1	3	1	6	−5	1	
49	C6	North Macedonia	4	0	1	3	2	10	−8	1	
50	C2	Georgia	4	0	0	4	5	9	−4	0	
51	C2	Andorra	6	1	2	3	6	8	−2	5	
52	C3	Liechtenstein	6	0	1	5	5	26	−21	1	
53	C1	Gibraltar	6	0	0	6	0	30	−30	0	

Source: UEFA
Rules for classification: Ranking criteria

== Goalscorers ==
There were 176 goals scored in 54 matches, for an average of 3.26 goals per match.

6 goals

- (Luxembourg women's national football team) Amy Thompson
- (Slovakia women's national football team) Tamara Morávková

5 goals

- (Cyprus women's national football team) Antri Violari
- (Slovakia women's national football team) Nikola Rybanská

4 goals

- (Andorra women's national football team) Teresa Morató
- (Faroe Islands women's national football team) Ásla Johannesen
- (Kosovo women's national football team) Kaltrina Biqkaj
- (Slovakia women's national football team) Patrícia Hmírová

3 goals

- (Armenia women's national football team) Narine Davtyan
- (Armenia women's national football team) Lara Kazanchian
- (Faroe Islands women's national football team) Heidi Sevdal
- (Israel women's national football team) Talia Sommer
- (Kazakhstan women's national football team) Karina Berikova
- (Kazakhstan women's national football team) Amina Bibossynova
- (Latvia women's national football team) Karlīna Miksone
- (Luxembourg women's national football team) Caroline Jorge
- (Luxembourg women's national football team) Laura Miller
- (Malta women's national football team) Haley Bugeja
- (Montenegro women's national football team) Armisa Kuč
- (Slovakia women's national football team) Klaudia Fabová

2 goals

- (Armenia women's national football team) Anna Dallakyan
- (Armenia women's national football team) Svetlana Karazgezian
- (Armenia women's national football team) Oksanna Pizlova
- (Georgia women's national football team) Teona Bakradze
- (Georgia women's national football team) Maiko Bebia
- (Georgia women's national football team) Natia Danelia
- (Israel women's national football team) Eden Avital
- (Israel women's national football team) Noa Selimhodzic
- (Kazakhstan women's national football team) Anastassiya Nizamutdinova
- (Kazakhstan women's national football team) Bibigul Nurusheva
- (Kosovo women's national football team) Erëleta Memeti
- (Liechtenstein women's national football team) Katharina Risch
- (Lithuania women's national football team) Rimantė Jonušaitė
- (Luxembourg women's national football team) Marta Estévez García
- (Luxembourg women's national football team) Charlotte Schmit
- (Malta women's national football team) Maria Farrugia
- (Moldova women's national football team) Claudia Chiper
- (Slovakia women's national football team) Karolína Bayerová
- (Slovakia women's national football team) Victoria Kaláberová
- (Slovakia women's national football team) Ľudmila Maťavková
- (Slovakia women's national football team) Mária Mikolajová

1 goal

- (Andorra women's national football team) Carla Ber
- (Andorra women's national football team) Laia Solé Palau
- (Armenia women's national football team) Maral Artin
- (Azerbaijan women's national football team) Esra Manya
- (Azerbaijan women's national football team) Nigar Mirzaliyeva
- (Azerbaijan women's national football team) Mana Mollayeva
- (Bulgaria women's national football team) Nikoleta Boycheva
- (Bulgaria women's national football team) Dimitra Ivanova
- (Bulgaria women's national football team) Lora Petrova
- (Bulgaria women's national football team) Polina Rasina
- (Cyprus women's national football team) Elena Aristodimou
- (Cyprus women's national football team) Marilia Constantinou
- (Cyprus women's national football team) Steffi Hardy
- (Cyprus women's national football team) Eirini Michail
- (Estonia women's national football team) Katrin Kirpu
- (Estonia women's national football team) Kristina Teern
- (Faroe Islands women's national football team) Durita Hummeland
- (Faroe Islands women's national football team) Jensa Kannuberg Tórolvsdóttir
- (Faroe Islands women's national football team) Eyðvør Klakstein
- (Georgia women's national football team) Tinatin Ambalia
- (Georgia women's national football team) Mariam Kalandadze
- (Georgia women's national football team) Lizi Mtskerashvili
- (Israel women's national football team) Marian Awad
- (Israel women's national football team) Maayan Ben Israel
- (Israel women's national football team) Smadar Cohen
- (Israel women's national football team) Eli Hutchinson
- (Israel women's national football team) Irena Kuznetsov
- (Kazakhstan women's national football team) Aigerim Aitymova
- (Kazakhstan women's national football team) Asselkhan Turlybekova
- (Kazakhstan women's national football team) Madina Zhanatayeva
- (Kazakhstan women's national football team) Karina Zhumabaikyzy
- (Kosovo women's national football team) Gentiana Fetaj
- (Kosovo women's national football team) Valentina Metaj
- (Kosovo women's national football team) Blerta Smaili
- (Latvia women's national football team) Olga Ševcova
- (Latvia women's national football team) Viktorija Zaičikova
- (Liechtenstein women's national football team) Lena Göppel
- (Liechtenstein women's national football team) Sophia Hürlimann
- (Liechtenstein women's national football team) Naomi Kindle
- (Lithuania women's national football team) Marija Galkina
- (Lithuania women's national football team) Monika Griksaite
- (Lithuania women's national football team) Ugnė Lazdauskaitė
- (Lithuania women's national football team) Tereza Romanovskaja
- (Luxembourg women's national football team) Ana Barbosa Abreu
- (Luxembourg women's national football team) Kimberley Dos Santos
- (Luxembourg women's national football team) Joana Lourenco Magalhães
- (Luxembourg women's national football team) Anna Miny
- (Malta women's national football team) Rachel Cuschieri
- (Malta women's national football team) Shona Zammit
- (Moldova women's national football team) Elina Coceanovschi
- (Moldova women's national football team) Iuliana Colnic
- (Moldova women's national football team) Carolina Țabur
- (Montenegro women's national football team) Medina Dešić
- (Montenegro women's national football team) Jasna Đoković
- (North Macedonia women's national football team) Ulza Maksuti
- (North Macedonia women's national football team) Simona Meyer
- (Slovakia women's national football team) Dominika Škorvánková

1 own goal

- (Cyprus women's national football team) Sara Papadopoulou (against Malta)
- (Gibraltar women's national football team) Joelle Gilbert (against Moldova)
- (Kosovo women's national football team) Lumbardha Misini (against Latvia)
