= Ľudmila Maťavková =

Slovak footballer

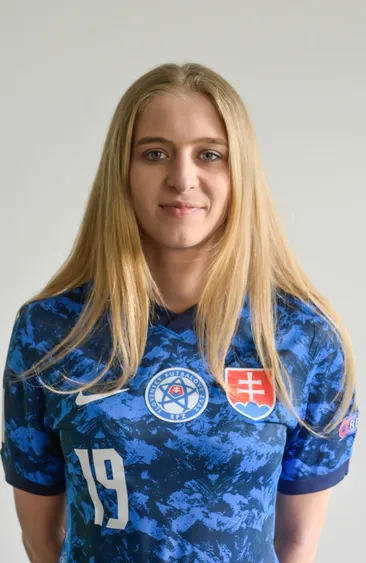

Personal information
- Date of birth: 11 April 1998 (age 28)
- Place of birth: Chynorany, Slovakia
- Height: 1.72 m (5 ft 8 in)
- Position: Midfielder

Team information
- Current team: SKN St. Pölten
- Number: 19

Youth career
- OŠK Chynorany
- FC Baník Prievidza

Senior career*
Years	Team	Apps	(Gls)
2016–2019	1. FC Slovácko		
2019–2020	Slovan Bratislava		
2020–2021	Charleroi	25	(4)
2021–2023	Club YLA	53	(16)
2023–2025	Anderlecht	60	(7)
2025–	SKN St. Pölten	10	(7)

International career^{‡}
2015	Slovakia U17	19	(9)
2017–	Slovakia	53	(6)
- * Club domestic league appearances and goals as of 20 August 2025 ‡ National team caps and goals as of 20 August 2025

Ľudmila Maťavková (born 11 April 1998) is a Slovak footballer who plays as midfielder for SKN St. Polten in the ÖFB Frauen-Bundesliga She played before in the Czech Women's First League for the 1. FC Slovácko and in the Slovak Women's First League for the Slovan Bratislava. She started her professional career in Belgium for team RSC Charleroi and she moved within Belgium to Club YLA and RSC Anderlecht. She is also taking important part in the Slovakia women's national team.

== Career ==
After being detected at the age of 14 by the German club Eintracht Frankfurt, Matavkova chose the Czech Republic and the club of 1. FC Slovácko as her first experience abroad. During 3 years she played and continued her studies. She returned for a year in the best Slovak team Slovan Bratislava and won the Slovak leagues in 2019.

Matavkova played the 2019–20 UEFA Women's Champions League qualifying round against Ferencváros, ŽFK Spartak Subotica and Anenii Noi.

Maťavková has been capped for the Slovakia national team, appearing for the team during the 2019 FIFA Women's World Cup qualifying cycle.

in July 2020, Maťavková signed with Charleroi and became the first slovak female player in the Belgian League. She made her debut on 16 July 2020 and scored the first goal in the history of the club's women's team during the game.

After one year in Charleroi she moved to north of Belgium to Brugge to the team Club YLA. She spent there 2 seasons and scored 16 goals, she helped the team always secured Play-off 1 place.

After successful seasons in Brugge she became part of the champion team RSC Anderlecht and she won with them title in season 2023/2024. She spent there 2 seasons, played 60 games and scored 7 goals. With Anderlecht she had opportunity to play again qualifation rounds in UEFA Women's Champions League

Her latest move went to Austria where she signed contract for champion SKN St. Polten. With St. Polten she plays the league phase of UEFA Women's Champions League and she is facing opponents like Lyon, Atletico, Chelsea and Juventus.

== International Goals ==
List of international goals scored by Ľudmila Maťavková
No.	Date	Venue	Opponent	Score	Result	Competition
1	28 November 2024	NTC Senec, Senec, Slovakia	Greece	1–0	2–1	Friendly
2	30 May 2025	Futbal Tatran Arena, Prešov, Slovakia	Gibraltar	4–0	11–0	2025 UEFA Women's Nations League
3	3 June 2025	Tórsvøllur, Tórshavn, Faroe Islands	Faroe Islands	2–1	2–1	2025 UEFA Women's Nations League

== Honours ==
- Slovak leagues Winner : 2019
- Czech First Division Third Place : 2017, 2018
- Czech Women's Cup finalist : 2018
- Belgian Super League winner 2024

Talent of the year 2013 Slovak leagues.
