= Viktoriya Hiryn =

Ukrainian footballer

Viktoriya Hiryn Вікторія Гірин (Ukrainian)
Personal information
- Full name: Viktoriya Fedorivna Hiryn
- Date of birth: 24 October 2000 (age 26)
- Place of birth: Novoukrainka, Volyn Oblast, Ukraine
- Position: Midfielder

Team information
- Current team: Metalist 1925 Kharkiv

Youth career
- 2012–2016: DYuSSh Volynianka Manevychi

Senior career*
| Years | Team | Apps | (Gls) |
| 2016 | DYuSSh-3 Ivano-Frankivsk | 3 | (3) |
| 2017–2022 | Ladomyr Volodymyr-Volynskyi | 61 | (36) |
| 2022 | Deportivo La Coruña | 8 | (0) |
| 2022–2025 | Ladomyr Volodymyr | 64 | (60) |
| 2025– | Metalist 1925 Kharkiv | 11 | (9) |

International career^{‡}
| 2015–2016 | Ukraine U17 | 9 | (0) |
| 2017–2019 | Ukraine U19 | 9 | (2) |
| 2020– | Ukraine | 26 | (1) |
- * Club domestic league appearances and goals as of 4 August 2025 ‡ National team caps and goals as of 4 August 2025

Viktoriya Fedorivna Hiryn (Ukrainian: Вікторія Федорівна Гірин, born 24 October 2000), also known as Vika Hiryn, is a Ukrainian footballer who plays as a midfielder for the Ukrainian Vyshcha Liha club Metalist 1925 Kharkiv and the Ukraine women's national team.

== Club career ==
As a teenager, Hiryn started out her football career in a local sports school in Manevychi near her native village of Novoukrainka. She played for a girls' football team, Volynianka, that represented the sports school.

In 2016, Hiryn played a few games for DYuSSh-3 Ivano-Frankivsk in the Persha Liha (tier 2), before signing with the top league's Ladomyr Volodymyr.

With small breaks from 2017 to 2025, Hiryn has played for Ladomyr with a short stint in Spain.

Since 2025, Hiryn has been signed with the leader of the Ukrainian women's football Metalist 1925 Kharkiv.

== International career ==
Hiryn capped for Ukraine at senior level during the UEFA Women's Euro 2022 qualifying.

== International goals ==
| No. | Date | Venue | Opponent | Score | Result | Competition |
|---|---|---|---|---|---|---|
| 1. | 5 December 2023 | Sportski centar FSS, Stara Pazova, Serbia | Serbia | 1–0 | 1–0 | 2023–24 UEFA Women's Nations League |
| 2. | 9 October 2026 | Futbal Tatran Arena, Prešov, Slovakia | Slovakia | 1–0 | 3–1 | 2027 FIFA Women's World Cup qualification play-offs |
