= Dina Blagojević =

Serbian footballer (born 1997)

Personal information
- Date of birth: 15 March 1997 (age 29)
- Place of birth: Serbia, FR Yugoslavia
- Position: Midfielder

Team information
- Current team: Crvena zvezda
- Number: 8

Senior career*
Years	Team	Apps	(Gls)
2017–2021	SC Sand	67	(9)
2021–2023	Bayer Leverkusen	19	(1)
2023–	Crvena zvezda	24	(4)

International career^{‡}
2014–	Serbia	54	(4)
- * Club domestic league appearances and goals as of 23:20, 4 December 2022 (UTC) ‡ National team caps and goals as of 15:10, 17 may 2024 (UTC)

Dina Blagojević (Serbian Cyrillic: Дина Благојевић; born 15 March 1997) is a Serbian footballer who plays as a midfielder for Crvena zvezda in the Serbian Women's Super League Women's Super League and has appeared for the Serbia women's national team. She won the title of Women's Super League and Serbian cup 2023-24.

== Career ==
Blagojević has been capped for the Serbia national team, appearing for the team during the 2019 FIFA Women's World Cup qualifying cycle.

== International goals ==
No.	Date	Venue	Opponent	Score	Result	Competition
1.	14 June 2021	Szent Gellért Fórum, Szeged, Hungary	Hungary	1–1	3–2	Friendly
2.	31 October 2023	Sportski centar FSS, Stara Pazova, Serbia	Poland	1–1	1–1	2023–24 UEFA Women's Nations League
