= Tamara Morávková =

Slovak footballer (born 2003)

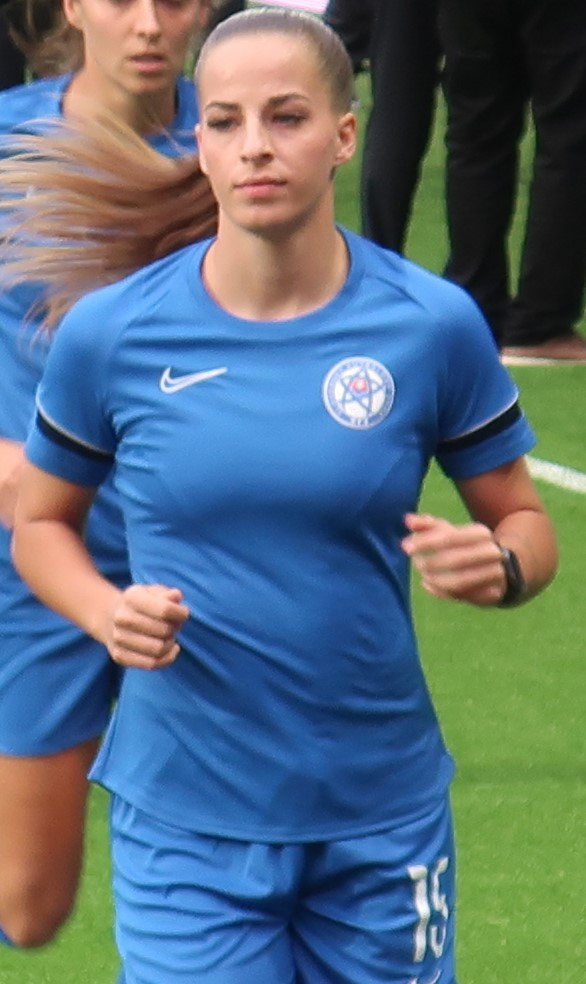
- Morávková in 2023

Personal information
- Date of birth: 2 January 2003 (age 23)
- Place of birth: Skalica, Slovakia
- Positions: Midfielder; winger; striker

Team information
- Current team: Slavia Prague
- Number: 28

Senior career*
Years	Team	Apps	(Gls)
2018–2019	Senica		
2019–2021	Slovan Bratislava		
2021–2022	Slovácko		
2023–	Slavia Prague		

International career^{‡}
2022–	Slovakia	29	(9)
- * Club domestic league appearances and goals ‡ National team caps and goals as of 30 August 2025

Tamara Morávková (born 2 January 2003) is a Slovak footballer who plays as a midfielder, winger, or striker for Slavia Prague.

== Early life ==
Tamara Morávková was born on 2 January 2003 in Skalica. She started playing football at the age of five. She attended school in Trnava, Slovakia.

== Career ==
Morávková was awarded the 2022 Slovak Female Under-19 Player of the Year. In 2023, she signed for Czech side Slavia Prague, helping the club win the league.

== Style of play ==
Morávková is known for her speed.

== International goals ==
No.	Date	Venue	Opponent	Score	Result	Competition
1	26 September 2023	NTC Senec, Senec, Slovakia	Croatia	2–0	4–0	2023–24 UEFA Women's Nations League
2	23 February 2024	LNK Sporta Parks, Riga, Latvia	Latvia	2–0	3–0	2023–24 UEFA Women's Nations League promotion/relegation matches
3	27 February 2024	Anton Malatinský Stadium, Trnava, Slovakia	Latvia	1–0	6–0	2023–24 UEFA Women's Nations League promotion/relegation matches
4	21 February 2025	Anton Malatinský Stadium, Trnava, Slovakia	Faroe Islands	2–0	3–0	2025 UEFA Women's Nations League
5	4 April 2025	Europa Sports Park, Europa Point, Gibraltar	Gibraltar	1–0	8–0	2025 UEFA Women's Nations League
6	4 April 2025	Europa Sports Park, Europa Point, Gibraltar	Gibraltar	3–0	8–0	2025 UEFA Women's Nations League
7	4 April 2025	Europa Sports Park, Europa Point, Gibraltar	Gibraltar	7–0	8–0	2025 UEFA Women's Nations League
8	4 April 2025	Europa Sports Park, Europa Point, Gibraltar	Gibraltar	8–0	8–0	2025 UEFA Women's Nations League
9	30 May 2025	Futbal Tatran Arena, Prešov, Slovakia	Gibraltar	9–0	11–0	2025 UEFA Women's Nations League

== Personal life ==
Morávková has a twin brother.
