= Allegra Poljak =

Serbian footballer (born 1999)

Personal information
- Date of birth: 5 February 1999 (age 27)
- Place of birth: Novi Sad, FR Yugoslavia
- Height: 1.62 m (5 ft 4 in)
- Positions: Defender; winger

Team information
- Current team: Atlético Madrid
- Number: 17

Senior career*
| Years | Team | Apps | (Gls) |
- Novi Bečej
- Novi Sad
| 2015–2016 | Spartak Subotica | | |
| 2017–2019 | Ferencváros | 32 | (27) |
| 2019–2021 | Granadilla | 40 | (8) |
| 2021–2023 | Real Sociedad | 34 | (4) |
| 2023–2024 | Levante Las Planas | 28 | (3) |
| 2024–2026 | Madrid CFF | 55 | (10) |
| 2026– | Atlético Madrid | 0 | (0) |

International career^{‡}
| 2014–2016 | Serbia U17 | 11 | (11) |
| 2015–2018 | Serbia U19 | 14 | (9) |
| 2015– | Serbia | 56 | (14) |
- * Club domestic league appearances and goals as of 01:20, 30 July 2026 (UTC) ‡ National team caps and goals as of 01:20, 10 June 2026 (UTC)

Allegra Poljak (Serbian Cyrillic: Алегра Пољак, born 5 February 1999) is a Serbian professional footballer who plays as a defender or winger for Liga F club Atlético Madrid and the Serbia national team.

== Club career ==
Poljak started her career in her hometown club Spartak Subotica in Serbia. After playing 4 seasons at the top league, Poljak left for the Hungarian Champions Ferencvárosi TC, where she spent 2 seasons playing 32 games and scoring 27 goals.

Poljak joined the Spanish side of UDG Tenerife in 2019 and played there until June 2021. Poljak moved to Real Sociedad in July 2021. She then went on to spend stints with Levante Las Planas and Madrid CFF.

In July 2026, Poljak signed for Atlético Madrid.

== International career ==
Poljak was an under-19 international for Serbia. and made her debut for the Senior national team of Serbia in 2015, at the age of 16. She has represented Serbia ten times, scoring three goals.

== International goals ==
Scores and results list Serbia's goal tally first.

| No. | Date | Venue | Opponent | Score | Result | Competition |
|---|---|---|---|---|---|---|
| 1. | 1 September 2019 | Kazhymukan Munaitpasov Stadium, Shymkent, Kazakhstan | Kazakhstan | 2–0 | 3–0 | UEFA Women's Euro 2022 qualifying |
| 2. | 6 March 2020 | Stadion FK Kolubara, Belgrade, Serbia | North Macedonia | 1–0 | 8–1 | UEFA Women's Euro 2022 qualifying |
| 3. | 6 March 2020 | Stadion FK Kolubara, Belgrade, Serbia | North Macedonia | 2–0 | 8–1 | UEFA Women's Euro 2022 qualifying |
| 4. | 20 February 2021 | Gold City Sports Complex, Kargıcak, Turkey | Ukraine | 1–1 | 1–1 | 2021 Turkish Women's Cup |
| 5. | 23 February 2021 | Gold City Sports Complex, Kargıcak, Turkey | Russia | 1–0 | 2–0 | 2021 Turkish Women's Cup |
| 6. | 14 June 2021 | Szent Gellért Fórum, Szeged, Hungary | Hungary | 3–1 | 3–2 | Friendly |
| 7. | 12 April 2022 | Serbian FA Sports Center, Stara Pazova, Serbia | Germany | 1–0 | 3–2 | 2023 FIFA Women's World Cup qualification |
| 8. | 17 February 2023 | Alanya, Turkey | Bosnia and Herzegovina | 1–1 | 3–2 | Friendly |
| 9. | 7 April 2023 | Serbian FA Sports Center, Stara Pazova, Serbia | Bosnia and Herzegovina | 1–0 | 6–0 | Friendly |
| 10. | 10 April 2023 | Serbian FA Sports Center, Stara Pazova, Serbia | South Africa | 3–0 | 3–2 | Friendly |
| 11. | 1 December 2023 | Theodoros Vardinogiannis Stadium, Heraklion, Greece | Greece | 2–0 | 2–0 | 2023–24 UEFA Women's Nations League |
| 12. | 27 February 2024 | Kópavogsvöllur, Kópavogur, Iceland | Iceland | 1–0 | 1–2 | 2023–24 UEFA Women's Nations League play-offs |
| 13. | 30 May 2025 | Serbian FA Sports Center, Stara Pazova, Serbia | Hungary | 1–0 | 1–0 | 2025 UEFA Women's Nations League |
| 14. | 9 June 2026 | Serbian FA Sports Center, Stara Pazova, Serbia | Denmark | 1–2 | 1–4 | 2027 FIFA Women's World Cup qualification |
