= Irena Kuznetsov =

Israeli footballer (born 2002)

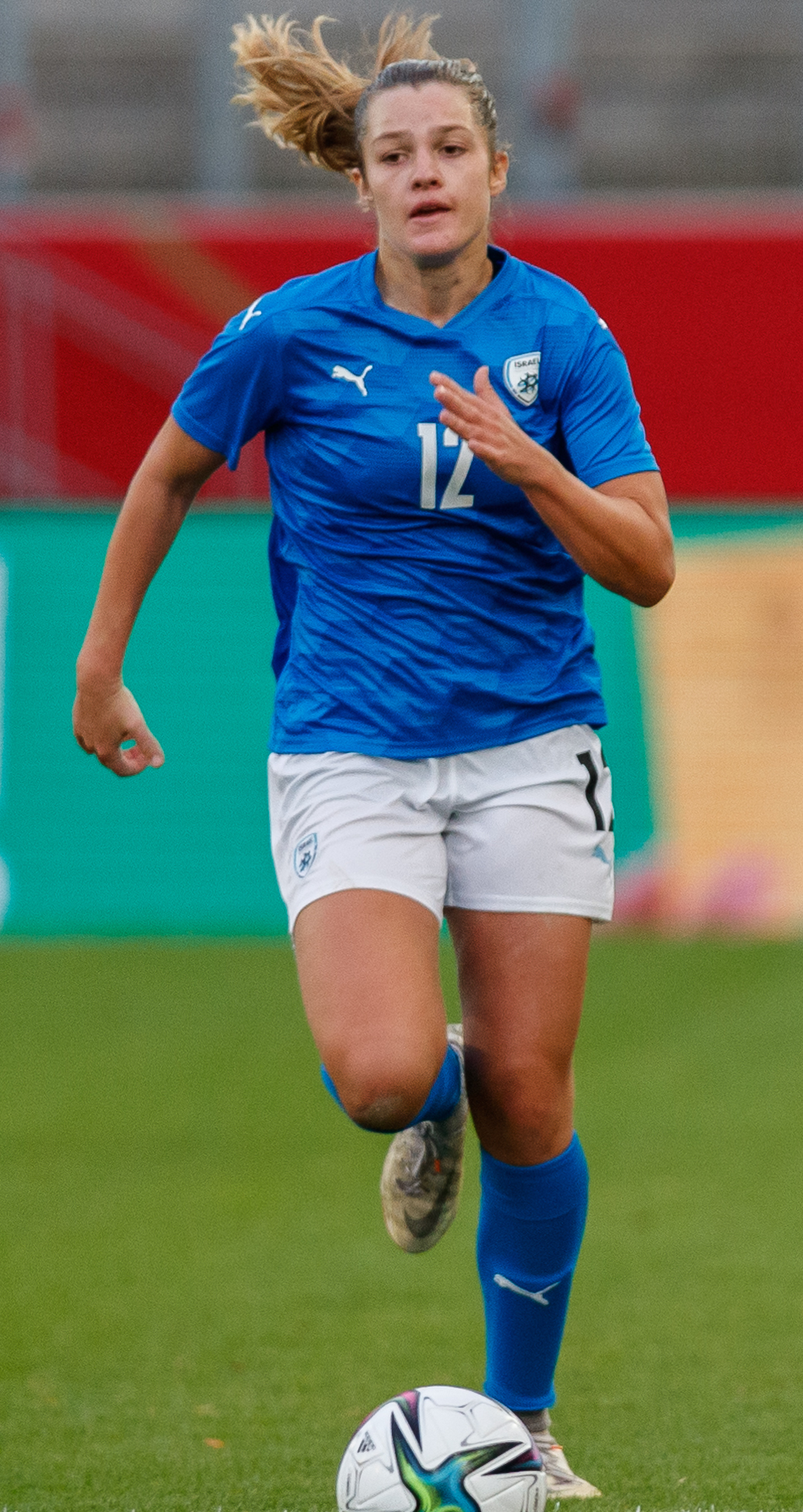
- Kuznetsov playing for Israel in 2021

Personal information
- Date of birth: 24 April 2002 (age 24)
- Place of birth: Hadera, Israel
- Position: Defender

Youth career
- 2010–2012: Ironi Sport Hadera (boys)
- 2012–2016: Maccabi Kishronot Hadera

Senior career*
Years	Team	Apps	(Gls)
2016–2019	Girls Football Academy	45	(4)
2019–2020	Maccabi Emek Hefer	15	(3)
2020	AEL Limassol	9	(0)
2020–2021	Maccabi Kishronot Hadera	9	(0)
2021–2022	Ramat HaSharon	5	(0)
2022–2025	Turbine Potsdam	51	(3)

International career^{‡}
2017–2018	Israel U19	7	(0)
2020–	Israel	23	(1)
- * Club domestic league appearances and goals as of 21 July 2025 ‡ National team caps and goals as of 25 February 2025

Irena Kuznetsov (Hebrew: אירנה קוזנצוב, Russian: Ирена Кузнецов; born 24 April 2002) is an Israeli professional footballer who plays as defender for the Israel women's national team.

She also holds a Russian passport.

== Early life ==
Kuznetsov was born and raised in Hadera, Israel to parents who immigrated from Russia to Israel.

== Club career ==
After having played in the boys' sections of the professional men's Israeli Premier League club of Ironi Sport Hadera, Kuznetsov was scouted in 2012 by the professional women's club of the Israeli Ligat Nashim's club, Maccabi Kishronot Hadera.

In 2012, she began her junior career in Maccabi Kishronot Hadera from the Israeli women's Premier League, where she played until 2016.

In 2016, she signed with the Ligat Nashim club of the Israeli National Women's Football Academy, and made her professional debut at the age of 14.

In 2019, she signed for the season and joined the Israeli club Maccabi Bnot Emek Hefer.

During the summer of 2020, at 18 years of age, she joined the Cypriot first division club AEL Limassol.

In November 2020, following poor working conditions, she terminated her contract to engage with Israeli club Maccabi Kishronot Hadera.

In January 2022, Kuznetsov joined German Bundesliga Turbine Potsdam, signing a 3.5-year contract. In May 2022, she played in the 2021–22 DFB-Pokal Final, which they lost 4–0 to VfL Wolfsburg.

== Career statistics ==
No.	Date	Venue	Opponent	Score	Result	Competition
1.	25 February 2025	Alcufer Stadion, Győr, Hungary	Estonia	3–1	3–1	2025 UEFA Women's Nations League C

== Honours ==
- Young player of the season of the Israeli Women's Premier League 2016–2017
- Best defender of Israeli Women's Premier League 2017–2018
- Best defender of September/October Cyprus's Women's Premier League 2020-2011
