= Jill Janssens =

Belgian footballer (born 2003)

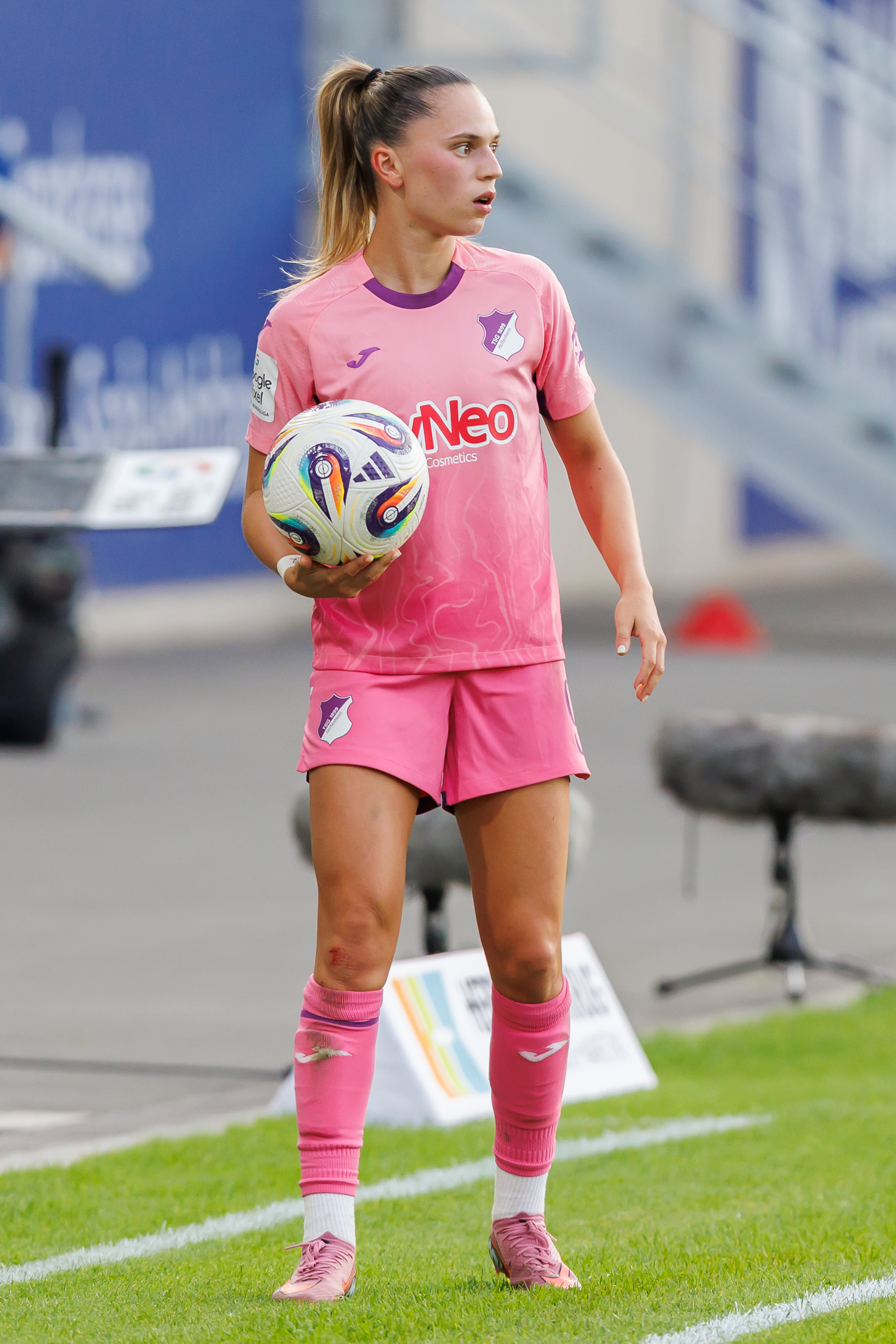
- Janssens with TSG Hoffenheim in 2025

Personal information
- Date of birth: 3 October 2003 (age 23)
- Place of birth: Diest, Belgium
- Position: Forward

Team information
- Current team: Union Berlin
- Number: 77

Senior career*
Years	Team	Apps	(Gls)
2020–2023	OH Leuven	87	(17)
2023–2026	TSG Hoffenheim	65	(7)
2026–	Union Berlin	11	(2)

International career^{‡}
2021–	Belgium	51	(6)
- * Club domestic league appearances and goals as of 20 November 2026 ‡ National team caps and goals as of 15 October 2026

Jill Janssens (born 3 October 2003) is a Belgian footballer who plays as a forward for Frauen-Bundesliga club Union Berlin and the Belgium national team.

== Career ==
Janssens started playing football in Bekkevoort for the local VC Bekkevoort. At the age of twelve she moved to Oud-Heverlee in the youth department of Oud-Heverlee Leuven. In the 2019/20 season she played seven games for the first team in the Belgian Women's Super League, the highest division in Belgian women's football.

She made her debut on 6 December 2019 in the 0–3 defeat in the away game against KRC Genk Ladies as a substitute in the 73rd minute. In the following season she was a contract player for the first team and already played 17 league games, in which she also scored two goals. She scored her first on 7 November 2020 (7th matchday) in a 4–2 win in the away game against the SV Zulte Waregem women's soccer team with the goal to make it 2–0 in the 60th minute.

During her time at OHL, the club finished second behind Anderlecht in the league in 2022 and 2023, finishing top of the regular campaign for 2022–2023, but not winning the title.

She was signed by Bundesliga club TSG 1899 Hoffenheim for the 2023/24 season and given a contract that runs until 30 June 2025.

In the summer of 2026, she will move to a league rival 1. FC Union Berlin.

== International career ==
Janssens made her debut for the Belgium national team on 10 June 2021, coming on as a substitute for Lenie Onzia against Spain.

At the start of 2022, Janssens helped Belgium win the Pinatar Cup in Spain for the first time, beating Russia on penalties in the final after a 0–0 draw.

Missing out on the Belgium squad for UEFA Women's Euro 2022 in England, where the Red Flames were beaten in the quarter-finals 1–0 by Sweden, she went on to contribute to Belgium's successful qualification for UEFA Women's Euro 2025 via the play-offs, starting both legs of the play-off final against Ukraine.

On 11 June 2025, Janssens was called up to the Belgium squad for the UEFA Women's Euro 2025.

== International goals ==
List of international goals scored by Jill Janssens.
No.	Date	Venue	Opponent	Score	Result	Competition
1.	27 February 2024	Den Dreef, Leuven, Belgium	Hungary	4–1	5–1	2023–24 UEFA Women's Nations League play-offs
2.	27 February 2024	Den Dreef, Leuven, Belgium	Hungary	5–1	5–1	2023–24 UEFA Women's Nations League play-offs
3.	26 June 2025	Edmond Machtens Stadium, Brussels, Belgium	Greece	2–0	2–0	Friendly
4.	1 December 2025	Estadio El Pamar, Sanlúcar de Barrameda, Spain	Finland	1–0	1–1	Friendly
5.	5 June 2026	Den Dreef, Leuven, Belgium	Luxembourg	5–0	6–0	2027 FIFA Women's World Cup qualification
6.	5 June 2026	Den Dreef, Leuven, Belgium	Luxembourg	6–0	6–0	2027 FIFA Women's World Cup qualification

== Honours ==
Belgium

- Pinatar Cup: 2022
