= 2023–24 UEFA Women's Nations League =

2023–2024 edition of the UEFA Women's Nations League

Tournament details
- Dates: League phase: 22 September – 5 December 2023; Nations League Finals and promotion/relegation matches 23–28 February 2024
- Teams: 51

Final positions
- Champions: Spain (1st title)
- Runners-up: France
- Third place: Germany
- Fourth place: Netherlands

Tournament statistics
- Matches played: 150
- Goals scored: 424 (2.83 per match)
- Attendance: 693,603 (4,624 per match)
- Top scorer(s): (Israel) Sharon Beck (9 goals)
- Women's European Qualifiers Women's Nations League

The 2023–24 UEFA Women's Nations League was the inaugural season of the UEFA Women's Nations League, an international women's football competition contested by the senior women's national teams of the member associations of UEFA. The league phase of the competition was played between September and December 2023, with the finals tournament taking place in February 2024. The results also determined the leagues for the UEFA Women's Euro 2025 qualifying competition, and which two teams (in addition to hosts France) qualified for the 2024 Summer Olympics in Paris.

== Format ==
The competition began with the league stage, featuring the national teams split into three leagues (A, B, and C) based on their UEFA Women's national team coefficient. Leagues A and B featured 16 teams in four groups of four teams, while League C consisted of the remaining competition entrants split into groups of three or four teams.

The teams in each group played against each other home-and-away in a round-robin format. The four group winners of League A advanced to the Nations League Finals, which featured single-leg semi-finals, a third-place play-off, and final. An open draw determined the pairings and home teams for the semi-final matches, as well as which semi-final will have its teams host the third-place play-off and final. The two best-ranked teams in the Nations League Finals (excluding France) qualified for the 2024 Summer Olympics.

In addition, the competition featured promotion and relegation, taking effect in UEFA Women's Euro 2025 qualifying (which uses an identical league structure). The group winners of Leagues B and C were automatically promoted, while the fourth-placed teams in Leagues A and B, as well as the lowest-ranked third-placed team in League B, were automatically relegated. Promotion/relegation matches were also held on a home-and-away basis, taking place in parallel with the Nations League Finals, to determine which teams would be promoted, relegated or remain in their respective leagues. The third-placed teams of League A played the runners-up of League B, while the three best-ranked third-placed teams in League B played the three best-ranked League C runners-up. The teams from the higher leagues were seeded, and played the second leg at home. In the two-legged ties, the team that scored more goals on aggregate was the winner. If the aggregate score was level, extra time was played (the away goals rule was not applied). If the score remained level after extra time, a penalty shoot-out was used to decide the winner.

=== Tiebreakers for group ranking ===
If two or more teams in the same group are equal on points on completion of the league phase, the following tie-breaking criteria are applied:

1. Higher number of points obtained in the matches played among the teams in question;
2. Superior goal difference in matches played among the teams in question;
3. Higher number of goals scored in the matches played among the teams in question;
4. If, after having applied criteria 1 to 3, teams still have an equal ranking, criteria 1 to 3 are reapplied exclusively to the matches between the teams in question to determine their final rankings. (Note: When there are two or more teams tied in points, criteria 1 to 3 are applied. After these criteria are applied, they may define the position of some of the teams involved, but not all of them. For example, if there is a three-way tie on points, the application of the first three criteria may only break the tie for one of the teams, leaving the other two teams still tied. In this case, the tiebreaking procedure is resumed, from the beginning, for those teams that are still tied.) If this procedure does not lead to a decision, criteria 5 to 11 apply;
5. Superior goal difference in all group matches;
6. Higher number of goals scored in all group matches;
7. Higher number of away goals scored in all group matches;
8. Higher number of wins in all group matches;
9. Higher number of away wins in all group matches;
10. Lower disciplinary points total in all group matches (1 point for a single yellow card, 3 points for a red card as a consequence of two yellow cards, 3 points for a direct red card, 4 points for a yellow card followed by a direct red card).
11. Position in the UEFA Women's national team coefficient ranking.

=== Criteria for league ranking ===
Individual league rankings are established according to the following criteria:

1. Position in the group;
2. Higher number of points;
3. Superior goal difference;
4. Higher number of goals scored;
5. Higher number of goals scored away from home;
6. Higher number of wins;
7. Higher number of wins away from home;
8. Lower disciplinary points total (1 point for a single yellow card, 3 points for a red card as a consequence of two yellow cards, 3 points for a direct red card, 4 points for a yellow card followed by a direct red card).
9. Position in the UEFA Women's national team coefficient ranking.

To rank teams in League C, which may be composed of different-sized groups, the results against the fourth-placed teams in these leagues are not taken into account to compare teams placed first, second, and third in their respective groups.

The ranking of the top four teams in League A is determined by their finish in the Nations League Finals.

=== Criteria for overall ranking ===
The overall UEFA Nations League rankings are established as follows:

1. The 16 League A teams are ranked 1st to 16th according to their league rankings.
2. The 16 League B teams are ranked 17th to 32nd according to their league rankings.
3. The League C teams are ranked 33rd onwards according to their league rankings.

== Schedule ==
The competition was played from September 2023 to February 2024. It began with the league phase and ended with the Nations League Finals and promotion/relegation matches played in parallel. Below is the schedule of the 2023–24 UEFA Women's Nations League.

Stage	Round	Match dates
League phase	Matchday 1	21–22 September 2023
League phase	Matchday 2	26 September 2023
League phase	Matchday 3	26–27 October 2023
League phase	Matchday 4	31 October 2023
League phase	Matchday 5	30 November – 1 December 2023
League phase	Matchday 6	5 December 2023
Finals	Semi-finals	23 February 2024
Finals	Third-place play-off	28 February 2024
Finals	Final	28 February 2024
Promotion/relegation matches	First leg	23 February 2024
Promotion/relegation matches	Second leg	27–28 February 2024

== Seeding ==
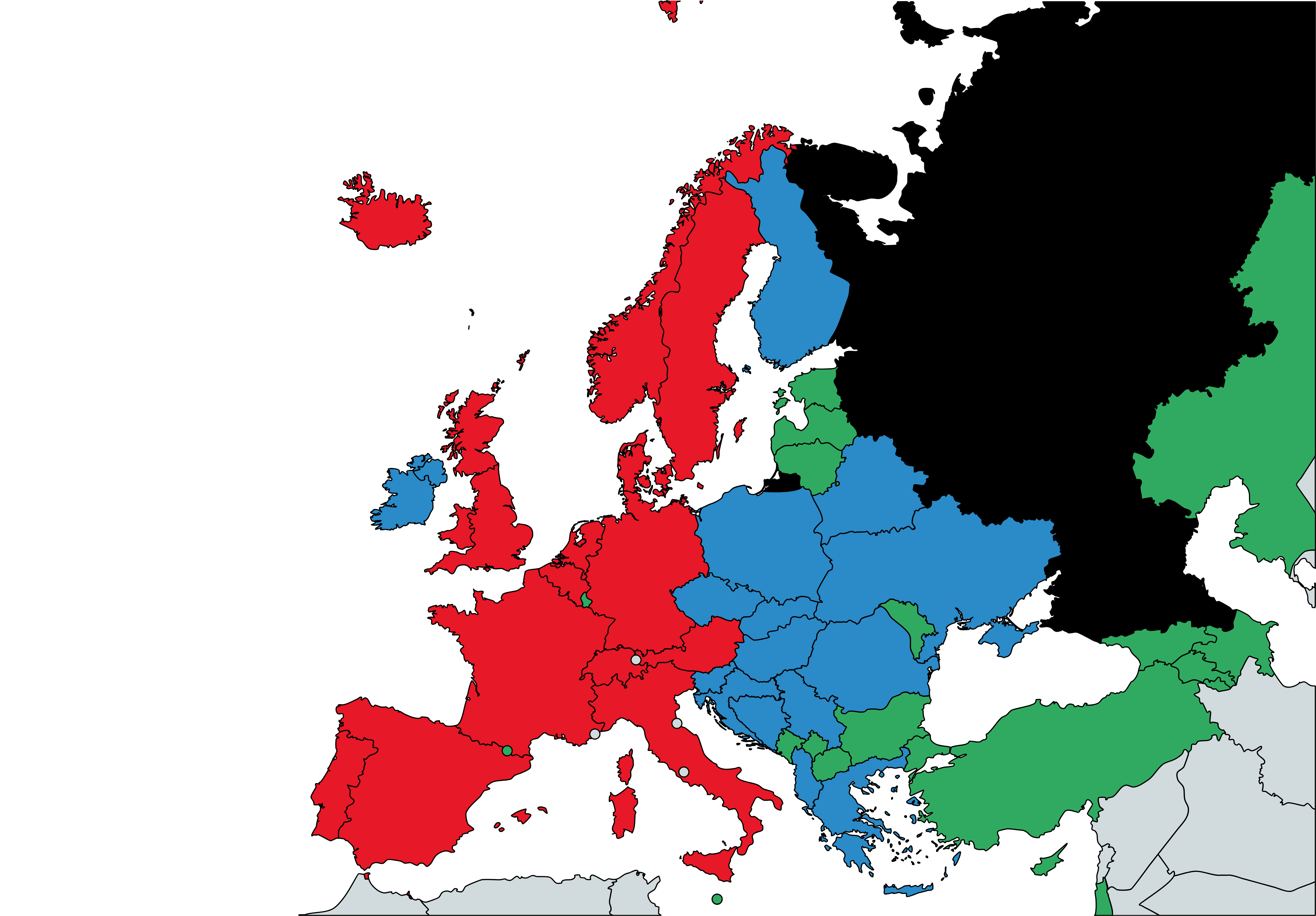
Teams league positions: League A League B League C Team banned from competition

All 55 UEFA national teams were able to submit an entry for the competition by 23 March 2023 at the latest, which also acted as entry for UEFA Women's Euro 2025 qualifying. In total, 51 teams entered the competition. Russia were not permitted to enter the competition, as Russian teams were suspended indefinitely from UEFA and FIFA competitions since 28 February 2022 due to their country's invasion of Ukraine.

In addition, Gibraltar, Liechtenstein and San Marino did not submit an entry, which meant that they could not qualify for UEFA Women's Euro 2025.

The draw for the league phase took place on 2 May 2023, 13:00 CEST, at the House of European Football in Nyon, Switzerland. Teams were split into leagues based on their UEFA Women's national team coefficient ranking. Teams were divided into four pots of four in Leagues A and B, and three pots of five and one pot of 4 in League C. For political reasons, Armenia and Azerbaijan (due to the Nagorno-Karabakh conflict), as well as Belarus and Ukraine (due to the Belarusian involvement in the Russian invasion of Ukraine), could not be drawn in the same group. Due to winter venue restrictions, a group could contain a maximum of two of Sweden, Norway, and Iceland in League A, and two of Estonia, the Faroe Islands, Latvia, and Lithuania in League C. Due to excessive travel restrictions, only one of Andorra, the Faroe Islands, and Malta could be drawn with Kazakhstan.

League A
Pot	Team	Coeff	Rank
1	England	46,178	1
1	Germany	43,043	2
1	France	42,584	3
1	Sweden	40,823	4
2	Spain	40,472	5
2	Netherlands	39,910	6
2	Norway	38,715	7
2	Denmark	37,535	8
3	Italy	36,455	9
3	Belgium	34,794	10
3	Austria	33,963	11
3	Iceland	33,348	12
4	Switzerland	33,101	13
4	Wales	29,942	15
4	Portugal	29,744	16
4	Scotland	29,335	17

League B
Pot	Team	Coeff	Rank
1	Republic of Ireland	28,877	18
1	Poland	28,458	19
1	Czech Republic	27,508	20
1	Finland	26,757	21
2	Serbia	26,517	22
2	Slovenia	26,445	23
2	Northern Ireland	25,711	24
2	Romania	24,877	25
3	Ukraine	24,359	26
3	Bosnia and Herzegovina	23,091	27
3	Slovakia	19,213	28
3	Hungary	18,552	29
4	Greece	17,556	30
4	Croatia	17,523	31
4	Belarus	16,890	32
4	Albania	16,826	33

League C
Pot	Team	Coeff	Rank
1	Malta	16,021	34
1	Israel	15,543	35
1	Azerbaijan	14,876	36
1	Turkey	14,865	37
1	North Macedonia	14,483	38
2	Kosovo	14,226	39
2	Montenegro	12,668	40
2	Luxembourg	12,051	41
2	Estonia	9,750	42
2	Moldova	9,654	43
3	Lithuania	9,649	44
3	Kazakhstan	8,662	45
3	Latvia	8,543	46
3	Bulgaria	8,200	47
3	Cyprus	8,032	48
4	Faroe Islands	7,020	49
4	Georgia	6,977	50
4	Armenia	6,500	51
4	Andorra	1,958	52

Did not enter
Team	Coeff	Rank
Gibraltar	0	—
Liechtenstein	0	—
San Marino	0	—

Banned from entering the competition
Team	Coeff	Rank
Russia	32,203	14

== League A ==
=== Group A1 ===
Pos	Team	Pld	W	D	L	GF	GA	GD	Pts	Qualification or relegation	(Netherlands)	(England)	(Belgium)	(Scotland)
1	Netherlands	6	4	0	2	14	6	+8	12 (Note: Tied on head-to-head results. Ranked on overall goal difference: Netherlands +8, England +7)	Qualification for Nations League Finals	—	2–1	4–0	4–0
2	England	6	4	0	2	15	8	+7	12		3–2	—	1–0	2–1
3	Belgium (O)	6	2	2	2	7	10	−3	8	Qualification for relegation play-offs	2–1	3–2	—	1–1
4	Scotland (R)	6	0	2	4	3	15	−12	2	Relegation to League B	0–1	0–6	1–1	—

Source: UEFA
(O) Play-off winners; (R) Relegated

=== Group A2 ===
Pos	Team	Pld	W	D	L	GF	GA	GD	Pts	Qualification or relegation	(France)	(Austria)	(Norway)	(Portugal)
1	France	6	5	1	0	9	1	+8	16	Qualification for Nations League Finals	—	3–0	0–0	2–0
2	Austria	6	3	1	2	7	8	−1	10		0–1	—	2–1	2–1
3	Norway (O)	6	1	2	3	9	8	+1	5	Qualification for relegation play-offs	1–2	1–1	—	4–0
4	Portugal (R)	6	1	0	5	5	13	−8	3	Relegation to League B	0–1	1–2	3–2	—

Source: UEFA
(O) Play-off winners; (R) Relegated

=== Group A3 ===
Pos	Team	Pld	W	D	L	GF	GA	GD	Pts	Qualification or relegation	(Germany)	(Denmark)	(Iceland)	(Wales)
1	Germany	6	4	1	1	14	3	+11	13	Qualification for Nations League Finals	—	3–0	4–0	5–1
2	Denmark	6	4	0	2	10	6	+4	12		2–0	—	0–1	2–1
3	Iceland (O)	6	3	0	3	4	8	−4	9	Qualification for relegation play-offs	0–2	0–1	—	1–0
4	Wales (R)	6	0	1	5	4	15	−11	1	Relegation to League B	0–0	1–5	1–2	—

Source: UEFA
(O) Play-off winners; (R) Relegated

=== Group A4 ===
Pos	Team	Pld	W	D	L	GF	GA	GD	Pts	Qualification or relegation	(Spain)	(Italy)	(Sweden)	(Switzerland)
1	Spain	6	5	0	1	23	9	+14	15	Qualification for Nations League Finals	—	2–3	5–3	5–0
2	Italy	6	3	1	2	8	5	+3	10		0–1	—	0–1	3–0
3	Sweden (O)	6	2	1	3	8	10	−2	7	Qualification for relegation play-offs	2–3	1–1	—	1–0
4	Switzerland (R)	6	1	0	5	2	17	−15	3	Relegation to League B	1–7	0–1	1–0	—

Source: UEFA
(O) Play-off winners; (R) Relegated

=== Nations League Finals ===
The pairings and home teams were determined via an open draw on 11 December 2023.

==== Bracket ====
Semi-finals
23 February 2024 – Seville
Spain	3
Netherlands	0
23 February 2024 – Décines-Charpieu
France	2
Germany	1

Final
28 February 2024 – Seville
Spain	2
France	0
Third place play-off
28 February 2024 – Heerenveen
Netherlands	0
Germany	2

==== Semi-finals ====
23 February 2024
21:00

Spain	3–0	Netherlands
Hermoso 41'; Bonmatí 45'; Batlle 77'	Report

La Cartuja, Seville
Attendance: 21,856
Referee: Rebecca Welch (England)

23 February 2024
21:00

France	2–1	Germany
Diani 41'; Karchaoui 45+4' (pen.)	Report	Gwinn 82' (pen.)

Parc Olympique Lyonnais, Décines-Charpieu
Attendance: 30,267
Referee: Esther Staubli (Switzerland)

==== Third-place play-off ====
Because France, who qualified automatically as hosts of the Olympics reached the final, the third place playoff determined the second team to qualify for the Olympics alongside Spain.

28 February 2024
20:45

Netherlands	0–2	Germany
	Report	Bühl 66'; Schüller 78'

Abe Lenstra Stadion, Heerenveen
Attendance: 21,128
Referee: Stéphanie Frappart (France)

==== Final ====
28 February 2024
19:00

Spain	2–0	France
Bonmatí 32'; Caldentey 53'	Report

Estadio de La Cartuja, Seville
Attendance: 32,657
Referee: Tess Olofsson (Sweden)

== League B ==
=== Group B1 ===
Pos	Team	Pld	W	D	L	GF	GA	GD	Pts	Promotion, qualification or relegation	(Republic of Ireland)	(Hungary)	(Northern Ireland)	(Albania)
1	Republic of Ireland (P)	6	6	0	0	20	2	+18	18	Promotion to League A	—	1–0	3–0	5–1
2	Hungary	6	2	2	2	11	9	+2	8	Qualification for promotion play-offs	0–4	—	3–2	6–0
3	Northern Ireland (O)	6	2	1	3	9	13	−4	7	Qualification for relegation play-offs	1–6	1–1	—	1–0
4	Albania (R)	6	0	1	5	2	18	−16	1	Relegation to League C	0–1	1–1	0–4	—

Source: UEFA
(O) Play-off winners; (P) Promoted; (R) Relegated

=== Group B2 ===
Pos	Team	Pld	W	D	L	GF	GA	GD	Pts	Promotion, qualification or relegation	(Finland)	(Croatia)	(Slovakia)	(Romania)
1	Finland (P)	6	5	1	0	18	2	+16	16	Promotion to League A	—	3–0	4–0	6–0
2	Croatia	6	3	0	3	5	10	−5	9	Qualification for promotion play-offs	0–2	—	2–0	2–1
3	Slovakia (O)	6	2	2	2	7	8	−1	8	Qualification for relegation play-offs	2–2	4–0	—	1–0
4	Romania (R)	6	0	1	5	1	11	−10	1	Relegation to League C	0–1	0–1	0–0	—

Source: UEFA
(O) Play-off winners; (P) Promoted; (R) Relegated

=== Group B3 ===
Pos	Team	Pld	W	D	L	GF	GA	GD	Pts	Promotion, qualification or relegation	(Poland)	(Serbia)	(Ukraine)	(Greece)
1	Poland (P)	6	5	1	0	11	4	+7	16	Promotion to League A	—	2–1	2–1	2–0
2	Serbia	6	3	1	2	10	5	+5	10	Qualification for promotion play-offs	1–1	—	0–1	4–0
3	Ukraine (O)	6	2	0	4	5	7	−2	6	Qualification for relegation play-offs	0–1	1–2	—	1–0
4	Greece (R)	6	1	0	5	3	13	−10	3	Relegation to League C	1–3	0–2	2–1	—

Source: UEFA
(O) Play-off winners; (P) Promoted; (R) Relegated

=== Group B4 ===
Pos	Team	Pld	W	D	L	GF	GA	GD	Pts	Promotion, qualification or relegation	(Czech Republic)	(Bosnia and Herzegovina)	(Slovenia)	(Belarus)
1	Czech Republic (P)	6	4	1	1	11	4	+7	13	Promotion to League A	—	2–2	4–0	2–1
2	Bosnia and Herzegovina	6	3	2	1	8	6	+2	11	Qualification for promotion play-offs	1–0	—	1–1	1–0
3	Slovenia (R)	6	1	3	2	4	9	−5	6	Relegation to League C	0–2	2–1	—	0–0
4	Belarus (R)	6	0	2	4	3	7	−4	2	Relegation to League C	0–1	1–2	1–1	—

Source: UEFA
(P) Promoted; (R) Relegated

=== Ranking of third-placed teams ===
Pos	Grp	Team	Pld	W	D	L	GF	GA	GD	Pts	Qualification or relegation
1	B2	Slovakia	6	2	2	2	7	8	−1	8	Qualification for relegation play-offs
2	B1	Northern Ireland	6	2	1	3	9	13	−4	7	Qualification for relegation play-offs
3	B3	Ukraine	6	2	0	4	5	7	−2	6	Qualification for relegation play-offs
4	B4	Slovenia	6	1	3	2	4	9	−5	6	Relegation to League C

Source: UEFA

== League C ==
=== Group C1 ===
Pos	Team	Pld	W	D	L	GF	GA	GD	Pts	Promotion or qualification	(Malta)	(Latvia)	(Andorra)	(Moldova)
1	Malta (P)	6	5	1	0	13	1	+12	16	Promotion to League B	—	2–1	5–0	2–0
2	Latvia	6	3	1	2	17	6	+11	10	Qualification for promotion play-offs	0–1	—	4–0	5–0
3	Andorra	6	1	1	4	2	17	−15	4		0–3	0–4	—	0–0
4	Moldova	6	0	3	3	4	12	−8	3		0–0	3–3	1–2	—

Source: UEFA
(P) Promoted

=== Group C2 ===
Pos	Team	Pld	W	D	L	GF	GA	GD	Pts	Promotion or qualification	(Turkey)	(Lithuania)	(Luxembourg)	(Georgia (country))
1	Turkey (P)	6	6	0	0	16	0	+16	18	Promotion to League B	—	2–0	1–0	2–0
2	Lithuania	6	1	2	3	4	9	−5	5 (Note: Ranked on head-to-head goal difference: Lithuania +1, Luxembourg 0, Georgia −1)		0–4	—	0–2	0–0
3	Luxembourg	6	1	2	3	6	11	−5	5		0–4	1–1	—	1–1
4	Georgia	6	1	2	3	5	11	−6	5		0–3	0–3	4–2	—

Source: UEFA
(P) Promoted

=== Group C3 ===
Pos	Team	Pld	W	D	L	GF	GA	GD	Pts	Promotion or qualification	(Azerbaijan)	(Montenegro)	(Cyprus)	(Faroe Islands)
1	Azerbaijan (P)	6	5	1	0	9	2	+7	16	Promotion to League B	—	3–0	1–1	1–0
2	Montenegro	6	4	0	2	14	4	+10	12	Qualification for promotion play-offs	0–1	—	2–0	9–0
3	Cyprus	6	2	1	3	3	6	−3	7		0–1	0–2	—	1–0
4	Faroe Islands	6	0	0	6	1	15	−14	0		1–2	0–1	0–1	—

Source: UEFA
(P) Promoted

=== Group C4 ===
Pos	Team	Pld	W	D	L	GF	GA	GD	Pts	Promotion or qualification	(Israel)	(Estonia)	(Kazakhstan)	(Armenia)
1	Israel (P)	6	5	1	0	21	2	+19	16	Promotion to League B	—	4–1	0–0	6–1
2	Estonia	6	3	1	2	11	11	0	10		0–5	—	0–0	5–1
3	Kazakhstan	6	2	2	2	6	5	+1	8		0–2	0–1	—	4–1
4	Armenia	6	0	0	6	5	25	−20	0		0–4	1–4	1–2	—

Source: UEFA
(P) Promoted

=== Group C5 ===
Pos	Team	Pld	W	D	L	GF	GA	GD	Pts	Promotion or qualification	(Kosovo)	(Bulgaria)	(North Macedonia)
1	Kosovo (P)	4	3	1	0	10	2	+8	10	Promotion to League B	—	5–1	3–1
2	Bulgaria	4	1	2	1	4	7	−3	5	Qualification for promotion play-offs	0–0	—	2–2
3	North Macedonia	4	0	1	3	3	8	−5	1		0–2	0–1	—

Source: UEFA
(P) Promoted

=== Ranking of second-placed teams ===
Due to differing group sizes in League C, results against fourth-placed teams were disregarded when ranking second-placed teams.

Pos	Grp	Team	Pld	W	D	L	GF	GA	GD	Pts	Qualification
1	C1	Latvia	4	2	0	2	9	3	+6	6	Qualification for promotion play-offs
2	C3	Montenegro	4	2	0	2	4	4	0	6	Qualification for promotion play-offs
3	C5	Bulgaria	4	1	2	1	4	7	−3	5	Qualification for promotion play-offs
4	C4	Estonia	4	1	1	2	2	9	−7	4	
5	C2	Lithuania	4	0	1	3	1	9	−8	1	

Source: UEFA
Rules for classification: Tiebreakers - not considering results against teams ranked fourth in each group

== Promotion/relegation matches ==
The pairings for the promotion/relegation matches were determined using a draw on 11 December 2023.

=== League A vs League B ===
Team 1	Agg.	Team 2	1st leg	2nd leg
Serbia	2–3	Iceland	1–1	1–2
Hungary	2–10	Belgium	1–5	1–5
Bosnia and Herzegovina	0–10	Sweden	0–5	0–5
Croatia	0–8	Norway	0–3	0–5

=== League B vs League C ===
Team 1	Agg.	Team 2	1st leg	2nd leg
Latvia	0–9	Slovakia	0–3	0–6
Montenegro	1–3	Northern Ireland	0–2	1–1
Bulgaria	0–7	Ukraine	0–4	0–3

== Overall ranking ==
The results of each team's league rankings were used to calculate the overall ranking of the competition, using the ranking criteria, and were used for seeding in the UEFA Women's Euro 2025 qualifying draw.

Key
Promotion to higher league for Women's Euro 2025 qualifying
Promotion playoff for higher league for Women's Euro 2025 qualifying
Relegation playoff for lower league for Women's Euro 2025 qualifying
Relegation to lower league for Women's Euro 2025 qualifying

League A

Rnk	Team	Pld	Pts
1	Spain	6	15
2	France	6	16
3	Germany	6	13
4	Netherlands	6	12
5	England	6	12
6	Denmark	6	12
7	Italy	6	10
8	Austria	6	10
9	Iceland	6	9
10	Belgium	6	8
11	Sweden	6	7
12	Norway	6	5
13	Portugal	6	3
14	Switzerland	6	3
15	Scotland	6	2
16	Wales	6	1

Source: UEFA
League B

Rnk	Team	Pld	Pts
17	Republic of Ireland	6	18
18	Finland	6	16
19	Poland	6	16
20	Czech Republic	6	13
21	Bosnia and Herzegovina	6	11
22	Serbia	6	10
23	Croatia	6	9
24	Hungary	6	8
25	Slovakia	6	8
26	Northern Ireland	6	7
27	Ukraine	6	6
28	Slovenia	6	6
29	Greece	6	3
30	Belarus	6	2
31	Romania	6	1
32	Albania	6	1

Source: UEFA
League C (Note: Due to unequal group sizes, matches against fourth-placed teams were not considered when ranking teams finishing first, second, or third.)

Rnk	Team	Pld	Pts
33	Turkey	4	12
34	Malta	4	12
35	Israel	4	10
36	Kosovo	4	10
37	Azerbaijan	4	10
38	Latvia	4	6
39	Montenegro	4	6
40	Bulgaria	4	5
41	Estonia	4	4
42	Lithuania	4	1
43	Luxembourg	4	4
44	Kazakhstan	4	2
45	North Macedonia	4	1
46	Cyprus	4	1
47	Andorra	4	0
48	Georgia	6	5
49	Moldova	6	3
50	Faroe Islands	6	0
51	Armenia	6	0

Source: UEFA
