= Slovakia women's national football team =

Slovakia
- Nickname(s): Repre; Slovenskí sokoli (falcons)
- Association: Slovenský Futbalový Zväz
- Confederation: UEFA (Europe)
- Head coach: Peter Kopún
- Captain: Dominika Škorvánková
- Most caps: Jana Vojteková (137)
- Top scorer: Patrícia Hmírová (32)
- FIFA code: SVK
| First colours | Second colours |

FIFA ranking
- Current: 57 ▼3 (20 October 2026)
- Highest: 34 (December 2006)
- Lowest: 51 (August 2024; December 2025)

First international
- Czech Republic 6–0 Slovakia (Hluk na Moravě, Czech Republic; 21 June 1993)

Biggest win
- Slovakia 11–0 Bosnia and Herzegovina (Šaľa, Slovakia; 2 September 1997); Slovakia 11–0 Gibraltar (Prešov, Slovakia; 30 May 2025)

Biggest defeat
- Norway 17–0 Slovakia (Ulefoss, Norway; 19 September 1995)

The Slovakia women's national football team represents Slovakia in international women's football.

== History ==
=== Czechoslovakia ===
The team debuted as Czechoslovakia in 1968 against Italy and lost 1–2. Later on, Czechoslovakia became a major force in women's football and first took part in the qualifying for the European Championships in 1989. They finished second in their qualifying group and reached the quarter-finals, where they lost in two legs (1–1 home, 0–2 away) against West Germany. Czechoslovakia also took part in qualifying for the European Championships in 1991. They finished one point behind Hungary and went to a play-off. Czechoslovakia's third and final qualifying phase for the European Championships in 1993 ended in a second-place finish behind Italy.

=== Slovakia ===
Slovakia made their debut in a friendly match against the Czech Republic on 21 June 1993. Slovakia lost 0–6. Slovakia made their competitive debut under their own name in the following qualifying, for the 1995 European Championships. Slovakia finished in second place, and therefore were classed by UEFA as between a Class A team, who were seeded, and class B, who had to play a playoff with class A.

Slovakia therefore had to play a playoff for the 1997 European Championships. The team finished last, and were relegated to Class B. Slovakia remained in Class B until the qualifying for the 2007 Women's Football World Cup, when classification was abolished, both for the European Championships and the World Cup. At the qualifying for 2009, Slovakia therefore had their first chance to qualify for a championship. Slovakia had to play in the first round, but won this game. In the second round, Slovakia lost, to Portugal.

== Team image ==
=== Nicknames ===
The Slovakia women's national football team has been known or nicknamed as the "Repre" or "Slovenskí sokoli (falcons)".

== Results and fixtures ==
The following is a list of match results in the last 12 months, as well as any future matches that have been scheduled.

Legend

Win Draw Loss Fixture

=== 2026 ===
| 3 March 2027 FIFA Women's World Cup qualification | Slovakia | 3–2 | Latvia | Popard, Slovakia |
| 16:00 | Hmírová 7'; Šurnovská 32'; Košíková 60' | Report (FIFA); Report (UEFA) | Poļuhoviča 56'; Ševcova 63' | Stadium: NTC Poprad; Attendance: 707; Referee: Vanja Janković (Slovenia) |

| 7 March 2027 FIFA Women's World Cup qualification | Portugal | 4–0 | Slovakia | Barcelos, Portugal |
| 16:00 (15:00 UTC) | Capeta 19', 44'; Santiago 48'; J. Silva 74' | Report (FIFA); Report (UEFA) | | Stadium: Estádio Cidade de Barcelos; Attendance: 5,156; Referee: Martina Molinaro (Italy) |

| 14 April 2027 FIFA Women's World Cup qualification | Finland | 4–2 | Slovakia | Helsinki, Finland |
| 17:30 (18:30 UTC+3) | Kosola 4'; Engman 22'; P. Nyström 67'; E. Nyström 75' | Report (FIFA); Report (UEFA) | Fabová 35'; Hmírová 71' (pen.) | Stadium: Helsinki Football Stadium; Attendance: 4,287; Referee: Kirsty Dowle (England) |

| 18 April 2027 FIFA Women's World Cup qualification | Slovakia | 1–2 | Portugal | Prešov |
| 16:00 | Fabová 8' | Report (FIFA); Report (UEFA) | Santiago 37'; Nazareth 42' | Stadium: Futbal Tatran Arena; Referee: Maïka Vanderstichel (France) |

| 5 June 2027 FIFA Women's World Cup qualification | Slovakia | 0–4 | Finland | Nitra |
| | | | | Stadium: Štadión pod Zoborom |

| 9 June 2027 FIFA Women's World Cup qualification | Latvia | 1–2 | Slovakia | Riga, Latvia |
| 20:00 | Miksone 45' (pen.) | Report (FIFA); Report (UEFA) | Lemešová 78'; Gondová 90+2' | Stadium: Daugava Stadium; Referee: Nanna Løf Andersen (Denmark) |

| 9 October 2026 2027 FIFA Women's World Cup play-offs | Slovakia | 1–3 | Ukraine | Prešov |
| 18:00 | Šurnovská 42' | Report (FIFA); Report (UEFA) | Hiryn 10'; Andrukhiv 47'; Boychuk 52' | Stadium: Futbal Tatran Arena; Attendance: 1,907; Referee: Nanna Løf Andersen (Denmark) |

| 13 October 2026 2027 FIFA Women's World Cup play-offs | Ukraine | 1–0 | Slovakia | Košická futbalová aréna, Košice (Slovakia) (Note: Due to the Russian invasion of Ukraine, Ukraine are required to play their home matches at neutral venues until further notice.) |
| 17:00 | Šurnovská 42' | Report (FIFA); Report (UEFA) | Hiryn 10'; Andrukhiv 47'; Boychuk 52' | Referee: Ewa Augustyn (Poland) |

== Coaching staff ==
=== Current coaching staff ===
As 1 September 2025

| Position | Name | Ref. |
|---|---|---|
| Head coach | (Slovakia) Peter Kopún | |
| Assistant coaches | (Slovakia) Lucia Haršanyová (Slovakia) Michal Švihorík | |
| Goalkeeping coach | (Slovakia) Martin Krnáč | |

=== Manager history ===
- Dušan Kučera (22.9.1993 – 21.9.1994)
- Pavol Peráček (9.9.1995 – 22.06.2002)
- František Urvay (9.9.2003 – 27.10.2007)
- Zsolt Pakusza (16.02.2008 – 19.01.2018)
- Ivan Hucko (28.2.2018 – 12.06.2018)
- Peter Kopúň (31.8.2018 – present)

== Players ==
=== Current squad ===
The following players were called up for the 2027 FIFA Women's World Cup qualification matches against Finland and Latvia on 5 and 9 June 2026 respectively.

Caps and goals correct as of 9 June 2026, after the match against Latvia.

| No. | Pos. | Player | Date of birth (age) | Caps | Goals | Club |
|---|---|---|---|---|---|---|
| 1 | GK | Viktória Opalková | 16 November 2006 (age 20) | 0 | 0 | (Slovak Football Association) Spartak Myjava |
| 12 | GK | Mária Korenčiová | 27 April 1989 (age 37) | 134 | 0 | (Italian Football Federation) Genoa |
| 23 | GK | Martina Geletová | 19 November 2003 (age 23) | 5 | 0 | (Polish Football Association) Orlen Gdańsk |
| 3 | DF | Laura Retkesová | 30 July 2004 (age 22) | 16 | 0 | (Football Association of the Czech Republic) Sparta Prague |
| 4 | DF | Andrea Horváthová | 5 October 1995 (age 31) | 75 | 0 | (Polish Football Association) Górnik Łęczna |
| 5 | DF | Zuzana Nárožná | 4 March 2005 (age 21) | 2 | 0 | (Slovak Football Association) Spartak Myjava |
| 6 | DF | Nina Matušicová | 2 March 2005 (age 21) | 6 | 0 | (Slovak Football Association) Spartak Myjava |
| 13 | DF | Kristína Košíková | 10 December 1993 (age 32) | 72 | 3 | (Football Association of the Czech Republic) Slavia Prague |
| 16 | DF | Diana Bartovičová | 20 May 1993 (age 33) | 133 | 8 | (Football Association of the Czech Republic) Slavia Prague |
| 20 | DF | Jana Vojteková | 12 August 1991 (age 35) | 137 | 14 | (Swiss Football Association) Basel |
| 22 | DF | Diana Lemešová | 4 October 2000 (age 26) | 31 | 3 | (Austrian Football Association) St. Pölten |
| 2 | MF | Dominika Gondová | 26 June 2007 (age 19) | 6 | 1 | (Slovak Football Association) Slovan Bratislava |
| 7 | MF | Dominika Kucharčíková | 19 November 1999 (age 27) | 1 | 0 | (Slovak Football Association) Slovan Bratislava |
| 9 | MF | Ľudmila Maťavková | 11 April 1998 (age 28) | 59 | 6 | (Austrian Football Association) St. Pölten |
| 10 | MF | Martina Šurnovská | 10 February 1999 (age 27) | 84 | 9 | (Football Association of the Czech Republic) Slavia Prague |
| 11 | MF | Katarína Bučková | 12 January 2007 (age 19) | 0 | 0 | (Football Association of the Czech Republic) Slovácko |
| 15 | MF | Michaela Ferencová | 26 March 2005 (age 21) | 6 | 0 | (Football Association of the Czech Republic) Slovan Liberec |
| 17 | MF | Mária Mikolajová | 13 June 1999 (age 27) | 100 | 19 | (German Football Association) Hamburger SV |
| 18 | MF | Dominika Škorvánková | 21 August 1991 (age 35) | 135 | 17 | (Austrian Football Association) Vienna |
| 19 | MF | Darina Hrúziková | 6 April 2005 (age 21) | 9 | 0 | (Football Association of the Czech Republic) Slovácko |
| 21 | MF | Victoria Kaláberová | 7 July 2001 (age 25) | 22 | 3 | (Polish Football Association) GKS Katowice |
| 8 | FW | Klaudia Fabová | 12 September 1998 (age 28) | 69 | 12 | (Polish Football Association) Orlen Gdańsk |
| 14 | FW | Laura Žemberyová | 20 August 2001 (age 25) | 29 | 0 | (Slovak Football Association) Tatran Prešov |

=== Recent call-ups ===
The following players have also been called up to the squad within the past 12 months.

| Pos. | Player | Date of birth (age) | Caps | Goals | Club | Latest call-up |
|---|---|---|---|---|---|---|
| GK | Anika Toth | 15 January 2002 (age 24) | 6 | 0 | (Canada) Halifax Tides | v. Portugal, 18 April 2026 |
| DF | Patrícia Fischerová | 26 August 1993 (age 33) | 117 | 4 | (Sweden) AIK | v. Portugal, 18 April 2026 |
| DF | Szilvia Nagy | 6 August 2003 (age 23) | 3 | 0 | (Slovakia) Komárno | v. Hungary, 28 October 2025 |
| MF | Patrícia Hmírová ^{INJ} | 30 November 1993 (age 32) | 134 | 32 | (Poland) GKS Katowice | v. Finland, 5 June 2026 |
| MF | Tamara Morávková | 2 January 2003 (age 23) | 35 | 9 | (Czech Republic) Slavia Prague | v. Portugal, 18 April 2026 |
| MF | Barbora Vargová | 1 June 2005 (age 21) | 1 | 0 | (Czech Republic) Slovan Liberec | v. Portugal, 18 April 2026 |
| MF | Aneta Surová ^{INJ} | 27 May 2005 (age 21) | 8 | 0 | (Czech Republic) Slovan Liberec | v. Finland, 14 April 2026 |
| FW | Nikola Rybanská | 3 February 1995 (age 31) | 17 | 7 | (Greece) OFI | v. Portugal, 7 March 2026 |
| FW | Anna Škerdová | 19 October 2004 (age 22) | 17 | 0 | (Czech Republic) Slovan Liberec | v. Hungary, 28 October 2025 |

Notes

- ^{INJ} = Withdrew due to injury
- ^{MED} = Withdrew due to medical reasons
- ^{PRE} = Preliminary squad / standby
- ^{RET} = Retired from the national team
- ^{WD} = Withdrew due to non-injury issue

== Records ==
As of 9 June 2026

Players in bold are still active with the national team.

=== Most appearances ===
| Rank | Player | Career | Caps | Goals |
|---|---|---|---|---|
| 1 | **Jana Vojteková** | 2010–present | 137 | 14 |
| 2 | **Dominika Škorvánková** | 2009–present | 135 | 17 |
| 3 | **Patrícia Hmírová** | 2012–present | 134 | 32 |
| 3 | Mária Korenčiová | 2006–2026 | 134 | 0 |
| 5 | **Diana Bartovičová** | 2010–present | 133 | 8 |
| 6 | **Patrícia Fischerová** | 2012–present | 117 | 4 |
| 7 | Lucia Ondrušová | 2006-2022 | 108 | 12 |
| 8 | Alexandra Bíróová | 2013-2024 | 107 | 6 |
| 9 | **Mária Mikolajová** | 2015–present | 100 | 19 |
| 10 | **Martina Šurnovská** | 2017–present | 84 | 9 |

=== Top goalscorers ===
| Rank | Player | Career | Goals | Caps | Avg. |
|---|---|---|---|---|---|
| 1 | **Patrícia Hmírová** | 2012–present | 32 | 134 | 0.24 |
| 2 | **Mária Mikolajová** | 2015–present | 19 | 100 | 0.19 |
| 3 | **Dominika Škorvánková** | 2009–present | 17 | 135 | 0.13 |
| 4 | **Jana Vojteková** | 2010–present | 14 | 137 | 0.10 |
| 5 | **Klaudia Fabová** | 2015–present | 12 | 69 | 0.17 |
| 5 | Lucia Ondrušová | 2006-2022 | 12 | 108 | 0.11 |
| 7 | **Tamara Morávková** | 2022–present | 9 | 35 | 0.26 |
| 7 | **Martina Šurnovská** | 2017–present | 9 | 84 | 0.11 |
| 9 | **Diana Bartovičová** | 2010–present | 8 | 133 | 0.06 |
| 10 | **Nikola Rybanská** | 2014–present | 7 | 15 | 0.47 |

== Individual awards ==
Slovak national team footballer Kamila Beregszasziova, who played for Olympia Košice, finished in 20th place in the historically first edition of the FIFA Women's World Player of the Year award in 2001.

== Competitive record ==
=== FIFA Women's World Cup ===
| FIFA Women's World Cup record | | | | | | | | | Qualification record | | | | | | |
| Year | Result | Pld | W | D* | L | GF | GA | GD | Pld | W | D* | L | GF | GA | GD |
| as Czechoslovakia | | | | | | | | | | | | | | | |
| (China) 1991 | Did not qualify | | | | | | | | UEFA Euro 1991 | | | | | | |
| as Slovakia | | | | | | | | | | | | | | | |
| (Sweden) 1995 | Did not qualify | | | | | | | | UEFA Euro 1995 | | | | | | |
| (United States) 1999 | Did not qualify | | | | | | | | 8 | 5 | 2 | 1 | 33 | 5 | +28 |
| (United States) 2003 | Did not qualify | | | | | | | | 8 | 5 | 0 | 3 | 25 | 11 | +14 |
| (China) 2007 | Did not qualify | | | | | | | | 8 | 5 | 0 | 1 | 14 | 5 | +9 |
| (Germany) 2011 | Did not qualify | | | | | | | | 8 | 2 | 0 | 6 | 15 | 13 | +2 |
| (Canada) 2015 | Did not qualify | | | | | | | | 10 | 1 | 1 | 8 | 6 | 29 | −23 |
| (France) 2019 | Did not qualify | | | | | | | | 8 | 1 | 0 | 7 | 4 | 23 | −19 |
| (Australia) (New Zealand) 2023 | Did not qualify | | | | | | | | 8 | 2 | 2 | 4 | 9 | 9 | 0 |
| (Brazil) 2027 | To be determined | | | | | | | | To be determined | | | | | | |
| (Costa Rica) (Jamaica) (Mexico) (United States) 2031 | To be determined | | | | | | | | To be determined | | | | | | |
| (United Kingdom) 2035 | To be determined | | | | | | | | To be determined | | | | | | |
| Total | - | - | - | - | - | - | - | - | 78 | 30 | 31 | 35 | 132 | 107 | +25 |

*Draws include knockout matches decided on penalty kicks.

=== UEFA Women's Championship ===
| UEFA Women's Championship record | | | | | | | | Qualifying record | | | | | | | |
| Year | Result | Pld | W | D* | L | GF | GA | Pld | W | D* | L | GF | GA | P/R | Rnk |
| as Czechoslovakia | | | | | | | | | | | | | | | |
| (England) (Italy) (Norway) (Sweden) 1984 | Did not enter | | | | | | | Did not enter | | | | | | | |
| (Norway) 1987 | Did not enter | | | | | | | Did not enter | | | | | | | |
| (West Germany) 1989 | Did not qualify | | | | | | | 10 | 4 | 5 | 1 | 11 | 6 | – | |
| (Denmark) 1991 | Did not qualify | | | | | | | 6 | 3 | 0 | 3 | 8 | 10 | – | |
| (Italy) 1993 | Did not qualify | | | | | | | 4 | 2 | 1 | 1 | 7 | 6 | – | |
| as Slovakia | | | | | | | | | | | | | | | |
| (England) (Germany) (Norway) (Sweden) 1995 | Did not qualify | | | | | | | 4 | 2 | 0 | 2 | 4 | 9 | – | |
| (Norway) (Sweden) 1997 | Did not qualify | | | | | | | 8 | 0 | 1 | 7 | 3 | 33 | – | |
| (Germany) 2001 | Did not qualify | | | | | | | 8 | 5 | 0 | 3 | 23 | 10 | – | |
| (England) 2005 | Did not qualify | | | | | | | 6 | 2 | 1 | 3 | 20 | 11 | – | |
| (Finland) 2009 | Did not qualify | | | | | | | 8 | 2 | 0 | 6 | 5 | 29 | – | |
| (Sweden) 2013 | Did not qualify | | | | | | | 8 | 3 | 1 | 4 | 8 | 7 | – | |
| (Netherlands) 2017 | Did not qualify | | | | | | | 8 | 3 | 0 | 5 | 11 | 13 | – | |
| (England) 2022 | Did not qualify | | | | | | | 8 | 3 | 1 | 4 | 7 | 19 | – | |
| (Switzerland) 2025 | Did not qualify | | | | | | | 8 | 2 | 2 | 4 | 7 | 14 | ▼ (Note: From Euro 2025 onwards a new qualifying format was introduced, linked to the Women's Nations League where teams are divided into leagues with promotion/relegation between the leagues at the end of each cycle.) | 28th |
| 2029 | To be determined | | | | | | | To be determined | | | | | | | |
| Total | - | - | - | - | - | - | - | 86 | 31 | 12 | 43 | 114 | 167 | 28th | |

*Draws include knockout matches decided on penalty kicks.

=== UEFA Women's Nations League ===
UEFA Women's Nations League record
| Year | League | Group | Pos | Pld | W | D | L | GF | GA | P/R | Rnk |
|---|---|---|---|---|---|---|---|---|---|---|---|
| 2023–24 | B | 2 | 3rd | 8 | 4 | 2 | 2 | 16 | 8 | * | 25th |
| 2025 | C | 1 | To be determined | | | | | | | | |
| Total | | | | 8 | 4 | 2 | 2 | 16 | 8 | 25th | |

| ▲ | Promoted at end of season |
| Same position | No movement at end of season |
| ▼ | Relegated at end of season |
| * | Participated in promotion/relegation play-offs |

== See also ==
- Slovakia national football team
