= Patrícia Fischerová =

Slovak footballer (born 1993)

Personal information
- Date of birth: 26 August 1993 (age 33)
- Place of birth: Martin, Slovakia
- Position: Defender

Team information
- Current team: AIK Fotboll
- Number: 37

Youth career
- 2005–2008: ŠK Turčianska Štiavnička
- 2009–2011: ŠFK VIX Zilina

Senior career*
| Years | Team | Apps | (Gls) |
| 2011–2012 | ŠFK VIX Zilina | | |
| 2012–2019 | 1. FC Katowice | | |
| 2019–2022 | Czarni Sosnowiec | 52 | (5) |
| 2022–2023 | IFK Kalmar | 23 | (2) |
| 2023– | AIK | 40 | (2) |

International career^{‡}
| 2012– | Slovakia | 111 | (4) |
- * Club domestic league appearances and goals as of 20 August 2025 ‡ National team caps and goals as of 20 August 2025

Patrícia Fischerová (born 26 August 1993) is a Slovak footballer who plays as a defender for AIK Fotboll and the Slovakia women's national team.

== Career ==
Fischerová has been capped for the Slovakia national team, appearing for the team during the 2019 FIFA Women's World Cup qualifying cycle.

== Honours ==
Czarni Sosnowiec

- Ekstraliga: 2020–21
- Polish Cup: 2020–21, 2021–22
