= Diana Lemešová =

Slovak footballer

Personal information
- Date of birth: 4 October 2000 (age 26)
- Place of birth: Slovakia
- Position: Defender

Team information
- Current team: SKN St. Pölten

Youth career
- Vranov nad Topľou
- Humenné

Senior career*
Years	Team	Apps	(Gls)
2017–2018	Partizán Bardejov		
2018–2019	USC Landhaus		
2019–2021	SKV Altenmarkt		
2021–2022	Wacker Innsbruck		
2022–	SKN St. Pölten		

International career^{‡}
2021–	Slovakia	27	(2)
- * Club domestic league appearances and goals ‡ National team caps and goals as of 30 August 2025

Diana Lemešová (born 4 October 2000) is a Slovak footballer who plays as a defender for SKN St. Pölten and the Slovakia national team.

== Career ==
Lemešová started football in her native Slovakia, playing for Vranov nad Topľou, Humenné and Partizán Bardejov. On 3 August 2018, Lemešová transferred to Austria to play in the ÖFB-Frauenliga for USC Landhaus. As of 2022, she plays for SKN St. Pölten. While playing for St. Pölten in April 2024, Lemešová sustained an anterior cruciate ligament injury which required multiple surgeries.

Lemešová made her debut for the Slovakia women's national team on 18 February 2021, coming on as a substitute for Patrícia Hmírová against Malta.

== International goals ==
Scores and results list Slovakia's goal tally first.

No.	Date	Venue	Opponent	Score	Result	Competition
1.	5 December 2023	Anton Malatinský Stadium, Trnava, Slovakia	Finland	1–1	2–2	2023–24 UEFA Women's Nations League
2.	9 June 2026	Daugava Stadium, Riga, Latvia	Latvia	1–1	2–1	2027 FIFA Women's World Cup qualification
