= Durita Hummeland =

Faroese footballer

Personal information
- Date of birth: 21 March 1998 (age 28)
- Place of birth: Faroe Islands,
- Position: Midfielder

Team information
- Current team: Kí

Senior career*
| Years | Team | Apps | (Gls) |
| 2013-2018 | EB/Skála | 110 | (28) |
| 2019- | Kí | 82 | (26) |

International career^{‡}
| 2015- | Faroe Islands | 8 | (0) |
- * Club domestic league appearances and goals as of 21 September 2023 (UTC) ‡ National team caps and goals as of 21 September 2023 (UTC)

Durita Hummeland (born 21 March 1998) is a Faroese footballer who plays as a midfielder and has appeared for the Faroe Islands women's national team.

== Career ==
Hummeland has been capped for the Faroe Islands national team, appearing for the team during the 2019 FIFA Women's World Cup qualifying cycle.
