= Lilla Turányi =

Hungarian footballer (born 1998)

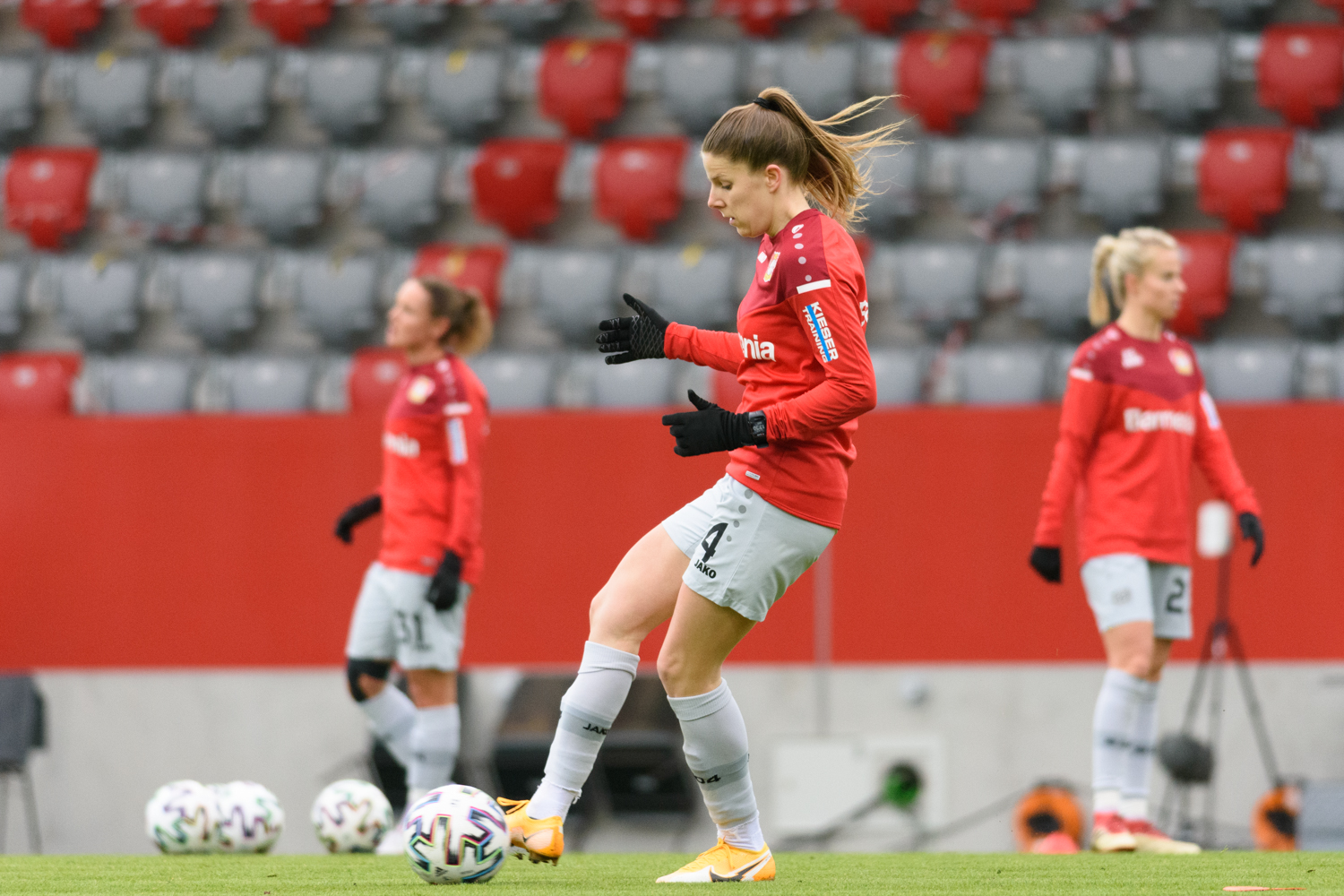
- Turányi with Bayer Leverkusen in 2020

Personal information
- Full name: Lilla Turányi
- Date of birth: 20 December 1998 (age 27)
- Place of birth: Budapest, Hungary
- Height: 1.71 m (5 ft 7 in)
- Position: Defender

Team information
- Current team: Bayer Leverkusen
- Number: 24

Youth career
- 2005–2013: Kistarcsai VSC
- 2013–2017: MTK Hungária

Senior career*
Years	Team	Apps	(Gls)
2017–2020	MTK Hungária	76	(9)
2020–	Bayer Leverkusen	126	(4)

International career^{‡}
2018–	Hungary	67	(7)
- * Club domestic league appearances and goals as of 20 November 2026 ‡ National team caps and goals as of 3 June 2025

Lilla Turányi (born 20 December 1998) is a Hungarian footballer who plays as a defender for Bayer Leverkusen in the Frauen-Bundesliga and the Hungary women's national team.

== Career ==
Turányi has been capped for the Hungary national team, appearing for the team during the 2019 FIFA Women's World Cup qualifying cycle.

== International goals ==
No.	Date	Venue	Opponent	Score	Result	Competition
1.	12 July 2023	Bozsik Aréna, Budapest, Hungary	Greece	1–0	1–0	Friendly
