= 2013–14 Israeli Women's Cup =

Tournament details
- Country: Israel
- Teams: 15

Final positions
- Champions: ASA Tel Aviv University (3rd title)
- Runners-up: Maccabi Kishronot Hadera

Tournament statistics
- Matches played: 13
- Goals scored: 88 (6.77 per match)
- Top goal scorer: Shirley Ohana (6)

The 2013–14 Israeli Women's Cup (Hebrew: גביע המדינה נשים, Gvia HaMedina Nashim) was the 16th season of Israel's women's nationwide football cup competition.

The competition was won by ASA Tel Aviv University who had beaten Maccabi Kishronot Hadera 2–1 in the final.

== Results ==
=== First round ===
24 December 2013	Bnot Eilat	0–17	Maccabi Kishronot Hadera	Eilat
15:30		Report	R. David 14'; D. Sofer 20'; T. Sofer 21'; S. Twil 26', 70', 83', 85', 87'; A. Twil 30', 48'; Van Ouwerkerk 31', 33', 58', 88'; Ben Aharon 35', 80'; Isaev 52'	Stadium: Rabin School Stadium; Referee: Rifat al-Hamula

24 December 2013	Maccabi Holon	15–0	Hapoel Be'er Sheva	Holon
19:00	Dayan 1', 8', 24'; Barqui 16'; Nwabueze 20'; Salame 29'; Fahima 36'; Ohana 49', 56', 70', 71'; Kauffman 59' (pen.); Erez 66'; Sendel 74'; V. Cohen 82'	Report		Stadium: Holon New Stadium; Referee: Tal Kaplan

24 December 2013	Hapoel Petah Tikva	5–0	Maccabi Be'er Sheva	Petah Tikva
20:00	Nasser 4'; Abu Shanab 10', 29'; Dahan 48'; Falah 50'	Report		Stadium: HaMoshava Synthetic Pitch; Referee: Valeri Karpinski

24 December 2013	F.C. Kiryat Gat	2–3	F.C. Ramat HaSharon	Kiryat Gat
20:30	Y. Cohen 17'; Efraim 75' (pen.)	Report	Shahaf 8'; Tayar 9'; Eni 70'	Stadium: Rogozin Synthetic grass pitch Referee: Shalom Ben Avrahamm

24 December 2013	Bnot Netnaya	2–1	Maccabi Tzur Shalom Bialik	Netanya
20:40	Wasserman 18'; Silberman 90'	Report	Feiger 69'	Stadium: Tubruk Stadium; Referee: Ron Shabtai

24 December 2013	Maccabi Kfar Saba	0–10	Bnot Sakhnin	Kfar Saba
20:40		Report	R. Zubidat 6', 40', 75', 76'; Ibrahim 11', 12', 19', 56'; Umbashi 65'; H. Zubidat 68'	Stadium: Levita Stadium training ground Referee: Artium Glakov

23 January 2014	F.C. Kafr Yasif	w/o (0–9) (abandoned '18)	ASA Tel Aviv University	Ramat Gan
20:00		Report	Shenar 2', 7', 9', 16'; Lavi 3'; Sages 8'; Fridman 11'; Paz 15'; Vaturi 17'	Stadium: Ramat Gan Stadium training ground Referee: Ziv Zango

=== Quarter-finals ===
4 February 2014	Maccabi Holon	6–1	Bnot Sakhnin	Holon
19:00	Ohana 10', 16'; Sendel 44'; Erez 50'; Barqui 51'; Fahima 56'	Report	Zubidat 12'	Stadium: Holon New Stadium; Referee: Dror Cohen

4 February 2014	Hapoel Petah Tikva	0–4	Maccabi Kishronot Hadera	Petah Tikva
19:00		Report	D. Sofer 30'; A. Twil 36'; S. David 58'; Van Ouwerkerk 84'	Stadium: HaMoshava Synthetic Pitch; Referee: Shalom Ben Avraham

4 February 2014	F.C. Ramat HaSharon	w/o	Bnot Caesarea Tiv'on	Ramat Hasharon
20:30				Stadium: Grundman Stadium Synthetic Pitch; Referee: Ziv Zango

4 February 2014	Bnot Netanya	1–6	ASA Tel Aviv University	Ramat Gan
20:30	Laor 32'	Report	Falkon 3', 78'; Lavi 28' (pen.); Yurman 32'; Ben Simhon 58' (o.g.); Kerem 85'	Stadium: Ramat Gan Stadium Training Ground; Referee: Ron Shabtai

=== Semi-finals ===
23 April 2014	F.C. Ramat HaSharon	0–1	Maccabi Kishronot Hadera	Ramat Gan
17:30		Report	A. Twil 26' (pen.)	Stadium: Ramat Gan Stadium; Referee: Idan Laiba

23 April 2014	ASA Tel Aviv University	1–1 (a.e.t.) (4–2 p)	Maccabi Holon	Ramat Gan
20:00	Shenar 37'	Report	V. Cohen 17'	Stadium: Ramat Gan Stadium; Referee: Shalom Ben Avraham
	Penalties
	Lavi (penalty scored); Falkon (penalty scored); Israel (penalty scored); Shenar (penalty scored)		(penalty scored) Shino; (penalty missed) Kauffman; (penalty scored) Erez; (penalty missed) V. Cohen

=== Final ===
30 April 2014
17:00

ASA Tel Aviv University	2–1	Maccabi Kishronot Hadera
Israel 9'; Falkon 15'	Report	Ravitz 29'

Ramat Gan Stadium, Ramat Gan
Referee: Meitar Shemesh
