= 2014–15 Israeli Women's Cup =

Tournament details
- Country: Israel
- Teams: 14

Tournament statistics
- Matches played: 12
- Goals scored: 95 (7.92 per match)
- Top goal scorer(s): Levia Van Ouwerkerk; Shirley Ohana (8)

The 2014–15 Israeli Women's Cup (Hebrew: גביע המדינה נשים, Gvia HaMedina Nashim) was the 17th season of Israel's women's nationwide football cup competition. The competition began on 14 December 2014 with 6 first round matches.

At the final, played on 13 May 2015, Maccabi Kishronot Hadera had beaten ASA Tel Aviv University 1–0 in extra time, with a single goal by striker Shirley Ohana, scored at the 97th minute.

== Results ==
=== First round ===
14 December 2014	Maccabi Be'er Sheva	6–0	Bnot Eilat	Be'er Sheva
18:30	Flus 40'; S. Cohen 61'; Tsvetkov 67', 79'; Landsman 69' (o.g.); Kdoshim 85'	Report		Stadium: Neve Noy Stadium; Referee: Hen Ben Simon

14 December 2014	ASA Tel Aviv University	11–0	Bnot Netanya	Tel Aviv
19:15	Paz 6', 42', 52'; Lavi 9', 16'; Fridman 39' (pen.), 49', 64'; Sages 44'; Yurman 75'; Refaeli 80'	Report		Stadium: Tel Aviv University Stadium; Referee: Nir Kochav

14 December 2014	F.C. Ramat HaSharon	1–0	F.C. Kiryat Gat	Ramat HaSharon
20:00	Shahaf 52'	Report		Stadium: Grundman Stadium Synthetic Pitch; Referee: Dror Cohen

14 December 2014	Hapoel Petah Tikva	0–2	Maccabi Holon	Petah Tikva
20:30		Report	Erez 56'; Shmuel 58'	Stadium: HaMoshava Synthetic Pitch; Referee: Sahar Bitton

14 December 2014	Maccabi Kishronot Hadera	17–0	Hapoel Be'er Sheva	Bat Hefer
20:40	Van Ouwerkerk 9', 13', 16', 25', 39', 78'; A. Twil 18', 52'; Schayer 25' (o.g.); Ohana 33', 72', 73'; Isaev 34'; T. Sofer 38'; S. Twil 41', 46'; S. David 66'	Report		Stadium: Bat Hefer Stadium; Referee: Idan Saidof

14 December 2014	Maccabi Kfar Saba	5–6	Maccabi Tzur Shalom Bialik	Kfar Saba
20:50	Shoval 20'; Yahas 23', 40' (pen.), 70', 88'	Report	Yusov 12'; Feiger 14', 37'; M. Jeries 47'; Asayag 66'; Gaddie 84'	Stadium: Levita Stadium training ground Referee: Ziv Zango

=== Quarter-finals ===
As seven clubs progressed to this round, Maccabi Be'er Sheva received a bye into the semi-finals.

3 February 2015	Maccabi Holon	2–3	F.C. Ramat HaSharon	Holon
19:45	Nwabueze 60', 72'	Report	Hussein 16', 58'; Shahaf 90'	Stadium: Holon New Stadium; Referee: Ron Shabtai

5 February 2015	ASA Tel Aviv University	15–0	Maccabi Tzur Shalom Bialik	Tel Aviv
19:15	Vaturi 22'; Falkon 23', 39', 48', 83'; Israel 30'; Paz 37'; Shenar 38', 50', 62', 65'; Zelikovich 73'; Prawer 77'; Yurman 79', 86'	Report		Stadium: Tel Aviv University; Referee: Refael Osidon

5 February 2015	Bnot Sakhnin	1–6	Maccabi Kishronot Hadera	Sakhnin
19:30	Nasser 41'	Report	Ohana 32', 36', 57'; D. Sofer 49'; T. Sofer 53'; A. Twil 87'	Stadium: Doha training ground Referee: Elad Ben Dor

=== Semi-finals ===
7 April 2015	ASA Tel Aviv University	15–1	Maccabi Be'er Sheva	Ramla
19:00	Falkon 5', 67', 77'; Fridman 18', 39'; Paz 20'; Shenar 23', 44', 63'; Israel 45', 75'; Morin 48'; Yurman 50'; Lavi 53' (pen.); Schwartz 58' (pen.)	Report	Tsvetkov 80' (pen.)	Stadium: Ramla Municipal Stadium; Referee: Dror Cohen

8 April 2015	F.C. Ramat HaSharon	0–3	Maccabi Kishronot Hadera	Ramla
17:30		Report	Van Ouwerkerk 14', 40'; Ohana 52'	Stadium: Ramla Municipal Stadium; Referee: Shalom Ben Avraham

=== Final ===
13 May 2015
19:40

ASA Tel Aviv University	0–1	Maccabi Kishronot Hadera
		Ohana 97'

Municipal Stadium, Lod
Attendance: 500
Referee: Menashe Mashiah
