= 2011 FIFA Women's World Cup qualification – UEFA Group 6 =

Football tournament qualification stage

The 2011 FIFA Women's World Cup qualification UEFA Group 6 was a UEFA qualifying group for the 2011 FIFA Women's World Cup. The group comprised Russia, the Republic of Ireland, Switzerland, Israel and Kazakhstan.

Switzerland won the group and advanced to the play-off rounds.

== Standings ==
Team	Pld	W	D	L	GF	GA	GD	Pts	Switzerland	Russia	Ireland	Israel	Kazakhstan
Switzerland	8	7	0	1	28	6	+22	21	—	1–2	2–0	6–0	8–0
Russia	8	6	1	1	30	6	+24	19	0–3	—	3–0	4–0	8–0
Republic of Ireland	8	4	1	3	12	10	+2	13	1–2	1–1	—	3–0	2–1
Israel	8	2	0	6	4	24	−20	6	1–2	1–6	0–3	—	1–0
Kazakhstan	8	0	0	8	4	32	−28	0	2–4	0–6	1–2	0–1	—

== Results ==
19 September 2009
17:00 UTC+2

Switzerland	2–0	Republic of Ireland
Moser 56'; Dickenmann 64' (pen.)	Report

Stadion Niedermatten, Wohlen
Referee: Christine Beck (Germany)

23 September 2009
19:30 UTC+2

Switzerland	1–2	Russia
Meyer 87'	Report	Skotnikova 8'; Danilova 16'

Esp Stadium, Fislisbach
Referee: Teodora Albon (Romania)

24 September 2009
19:30 UTC+1

Republic of Ireland	2–1	Kazakhstan
O'Sullivan 43'; Roche 87'	Report	Krassyukova 64'

Turners Cross, Cork
Referee: Aneliya Sinabova (Bulgaria)

24 October 2009
17:00 UTC+3

Israel	1–0	Kazakhstan
Erez 42'	Report

Ness Ziona Stadium, Ness Ziona
Referee: Laurence Zeien (Luxembourg)

25 October 2009
15:00 UTC+3

Russia	3–0	Republic of Ireland
Morozova 12'; Savchenkova 52'; Petrova 90+1'	Report

Krasnoarmeysk Stadium, Krasnoarmeysk
Referee: Jenny Palmqvist (Sweden)

28 October 2009
17:00 UTC+2

Israel	1–2	Switzerland
Abbé 76' (o.g.)	Report	Maendly 55'; Abbé 90+1'

Ness Ziona Stadium, Ness Ziona
Referee: Kateryna Monzul (Ukraine)

29 October 2009
14:00 UTC+6

Kazakhstan	1–2	Republic of Ireland
Yalova 6'	Report	Roche 64'; Tracy 70'

Zhetysu Stadium, Taldykorgan
Referee: Kirsi Heikkinen (Finland)

17 November 2009
14:00 UTC+2

Israel	1–6	Russia
Cohen 47'	Report	Poryadina 10'; Fomina 29', 89'; Savchenkova 62'; Kurochkina 81'; Kozhnikova 85'

Ramat Gan Stadium, Ramat Gan
Referee: Mihaela Gurdon Bašimamović (Croatia)

21 March 2010
17:00 UTC+2

Israel	0–3	Republic of Ireland
	Report	O'Sullivan 32', 52'; O'Brien 81'

Ness Ziona Stadium, Ness Ziona
Referee: Ann-Helen Østervold (Norway)

27 March 2010
16:00 UTC+1

Switzerland	6–0	Israel
Abbé 8', 64'; Barqui 14' (o.g.); Stein 68'; Dickenmann 71'; Crnogorcevic 90+3'	Report

Stadion Niedermatten, Wohlen
Referee: Gordana Kuzmanović (Serbia)

28 March 2010
13:00 UTC+6

Kazakhstan	0–6	Russia
	Report	Kurochkina 42', 56' (pen.), 71' (pen.), 89'; Savchenkova 44'; Terekhova 52'

Zhetysu Stadium, Taldykorgan
Referee: Sabine Bonnin (France)

31 March 2010
19:30 UTC+1

Republic of Ireland	1–2	Switzerland
Grant 57'	Report	Maendly 21'; Beney 54'

Richmond Park, Dublin
Referee: Jana Adámková (Czech Republic)

19 June 2010
16:00 UTC+6

Kazakhstan	0–1	Israel
	Report	Sofer 71'

Astana Arena, Astana
Referee: Monica Mularczyk (Poland)
19 June 2010
17:00 UTC+4

Russia	0–3	Switzerland
	Report	Kuster 18'; Bachmann 77', 78'

Krasnoarmeysk Stadium, Krasnoarmeysk
Referee: Dagmar Damková (Czech Republic)

23 June 2010
16:00 UTC+6

Kazakhstan	2–4	Switzerland
Yalova 16', 44'	Report	Bachmann 15'; Dickenmann 43', 56'; Meyer 57'

Shakhtyor Stadium, Karagandy
Referee: Donka Zheleva-Terzieva (Bulgaria)

24 June 2010
18:00 UTC+4

Russia	4–0	Israel
Kurochkina 5' (pen.); Skotnikova 24'; Kozhnikova 31'; Sochneva 80'	Report

Krasnoarmeysk Stadium, Krasnoarmeysk
Referee: Alexandra Ihringova (England)

21 August 2010
15:00 UTC+1

Republic of Ireland	1–1	Russia
Grant 59' (pen.)	Report	Kozhnikova 64'

Ferrycarrig Park, Wexford
Referee: Cristina Dorcioman (Romania)
21 August 2010
17:00 UTC+2

Switzerland	8–0	Kazakhstan
Crnogorcevic 4', 27', 44', 57', 77'; Zumbühl 7'; Moser 11', 56'	Report

Stade Universitaire Saint-Léonard, Fribourg
Referee: Christina Westrum Pedersen (Norway)

25 August 2010
18:00 UTC+4

Russia	8–0	Kazakhstan
Skotnikova 2'; Sochneva 34', 88'; Danilova 50', 55', 62', 72'; Semenchenko 64'	Report

Krasnoarmeysk Stadium, Krasnoarmeysk
Referee: Claudine Brohet (Belgium)
25 August 2010
19:30 UTC+1

Republic of Ireland	3–0	Israel
O'Sullivan 59', 64', 80'	Report

Carlisle Grounds, Bray
Referee: Elia María Martínez Martínez (Spain)
