= 2015–16 Israeli Women's Cup =

Tournament details
- Country: Israel

Final positions
- Champions: F.C. Kiryat Gat
- Runners-up: ASA Tel Aviv University

Tournament statistics
- Matches played: 11
- Goals scored: 58 (5.27 per match)

The 2015–16 Israeli Women's Cup (Hebrew: גביע המדינה נשים, Gvia HaMedina Nashim) was the 18th season of Israel's women's nationwide football cup competition. The competition began on 8 December 2015 with 5 first round matches.

F.C. Kiryat Gat won the cup, beating ASA Tel Aviv University 1–0 in the final.

== Results ==
=== First round ===
8 December 2015	ASA Tel Aviv University	2–0	Maccabi Kishronot Hadera	Tel Aviv
19:15	Shenar 1'; Ohana 24'	Report		Stadium: Tel Aviv University Stadium; Referee: Meitar Shemesh

8 December 2015	Maccabi Tzur Shalom Bialik	0–11	Bnot Sakhnin	Kiryat Bialik
19:15		Report	Ibrahim 5', 84'; Hamudi 16', 49'; Zubidat 35', 68', 75', 78'; Rashed 69', 87'; Sa'id 74'	Stadium: Tzur Shalom Stadium; Referee: Daniel Levy

8 December 2015	F.C. Ramat HaSharon	2–1	Hapoel Petah Tikva	Ramat HaSharon
19:30	Cameron 55', 88'	Report	Steinsneider 11'	Stadium: Grundman Stadium; Referee: Sahar Bitton

8 December 2015	Bnot Netanya	3–0	Maccabi Be'er Sheva	Netanya
20:00	Assaf 26'; Nissenboim 39'; Ohana 87'			Stadium: Shapira Stadium

8 December 2015	Maccabi Holon	9–0	Maccabi Kfar Saba	Holon
20:00	Hussein 6', 8', 43', 66'; Erez 10'; Gauto 42', 45', 49'; Ludin 47'			Stadium: Holon New Stadium

=== Quarter-finals ===
As seven clubs progressed to this round, F.C. Ramat HaSharon received a bye into the semi-finals.

2 February 2016	Bnot Sakhnin	0–4	F.C. Kiryat Gat	Sakhnin
19:15		Report	V. Cohen 34'; Pahima 65'; Laiu 67', 78'	Stadium: Doha training ground Referee: Walid Faisal

2 February 2016	Maccabi Holon	4–1	Bnot Netanya	Holon
20:00	Castaño 18' (pen.); Gauto 21', 81', 83'	Report	Nissim 5' (o.g.)	Stadium: Holon New Stadium; Referee: Nir Kochav

2 February 2016	Hapoel Be'er Sheva	0–14	ASA Tel Aviv University	Be'er Sheva
20:30		Report	Avital 6', 31', 55'; Israel 17'; Fridman 24', 84'; Ohana 48', 63', 70', 85', 87'; Yurman 57', 74'; Kaniel 76'	Stadium: Reisser Stadium; Referee: Mahmud Al-Qrenawi

=== Semi-finals ===
26 April 2016	ASA Tel Aviv University	3–0	Maccabi Holon	Ramat Gan
18:00	Shenar 35', 85'; Fridman 77'	Report		Stadium: Ramat Gan Stadium; Referee: Rachel Cohen-Shakuri

26 April 2016	F.C. Ramat HaSharon	1–2	F.C. Kiryat Gat	Ramat Gan
20:30	Adebisi 61'	Report	V. Cohen 31'; Efraim 53'	Stadium: Ramat Gan Stadium; Referee: Meitar Shemesh

=== Final ===
18 May 2016
19:40

ASA Tel Aviv University	0–1	F.C. Kiryat Gat
	Report	Laiu 57'

Municipal Stadium, Lod
Referee: Meitar Shemesh
