= Israel women's national football team =

Women's national association football team representing Israel

Israel
- Association: Israel Football Association
- Confederation: UEFA (Europe)
- Head coach: Meni Koretski
- Captain: Shani David
- Most caps: Karin Sendel (69)
- Top scorer: Silvi Jan (29)
- FIFA code: ISR
First colours	Second colours

FIFA ranking
- Current: 66 (20 October 2026)
- Highest: 53 (March 2017)
- Lowest: 76 (March 2022)

First international
- Unofficial: Netherlands 12–0 Israel (Zaandam, Netherlands; 27 August 1977); Official: Israel 0–7 Romania (Bat Yam, Israel; 2 November 1997)

Biggest win
- Israel 12–1 Estonia (Herzliya, Israel; 9 October 2004)

Biggest defeat
- Israel 0–13 Poland (Ramat Gan, Israel; 25 February 1998)

The Israel women's national football team (Hebrew: נבחרת ישראל בכדורגל לנשים) represents Israel in international women's football. The Israel women's national football team was established in 1997, two years before Israel’s first women’s football league was launched.

== History ==
Women's football in Israel first appeared in 1970, with several clubs being formed in the following years. However, these clubs folded, except for the M.I.L.N (Moa'don Israeli LeKaduregel Nashim (Hebrew: מועדון ישראלי לכדורגל נשים, lit. Israeli Club for Women's Football)), which continued touring and playing exhibition matches in Israel and abroad. During this period a team representing Israel played a match against Netherlands, losing 0–12.

In 1997, following FIFA orders, the IFA established a women's national team ahead of the 1999 FIFA women's World Cup. Rony Schneider was appointed as team manager and supervised a series of trials, which resulted in a 26 women squad, which played its first official match against Romania on 2 November 1997.

The team is yet to make an appearance in either the World Cup or the Women's Euro.

=== 2025 ===
In 2025 UEFA Women's Nations League C, Israel topped its group containing Estonia and Bulgaria and was promoted to League B.

== FIFA world rankings ==
As of 14 April 2021

Year	End rank	Best rank	Worst rank
2003	70	70	72
2004	71	69	71
2005	67	67	71
2006	63	63	68
2007	63	61	64
2008	60	60	63
2009	57	56	57
2010	61	58	61
2011	65	60	65
2012	62	60	63
2013	55	55	61
2014	55	55	62
2015	59	57	59
2016	55	55	56
2017	62	53	62
2018	64		64
2019	63		63
2020	68		
2021			

== Results and fixtures ==
- The following is a list of match results in the last 12 months, as well as any future matches that have been scheduled.

Legend

Win Draw Lose Fixture

=== 2026 ===
3 March 2027 FIFA Women's World Cup qualification	Israel	0–3	Belgium	Budaörs, Hungary (Note: Due to security reasons, Israel played their matches against Belgium behind closed doors on neutral ground.)
19:30 CET		Report	Wullaert 26'; Eurlings 42'; Janssen 89'	Stadium: BSC Stadium; Attendance: 0 (behind closed doors); Referee: Michaela Pachtová (Czech Republic)

7 March 2027 FIFA Women's World Cup qualification	Belgium	5–0	Israel	Budaörs, Hungary
17:00 CET	Wullaert 10', 16', 66' (pen.); Mertens 19'; Missipo 90+3'	Report		Stadium: BSC Stadium; Attendance: 0 (behind closed doors); Referee: Rasa Grigonė (Lithuania)

14 April 2027 FIFA Women's World Cup qualification	Israel	6–0	Luxembourg	Budaörs, Hungary (Note: Due to security reasons, Israel played their matches against Luxembourg behind closed doors on neutral ground.)
19:15	Kats 10', 44', 83'; Selimhodzic 13'; Ben Israel 18', 40'	Report		Stadium: BSC Stadium; Attendance: 0 (behind closed doors); Referee: Maria Marotta (Italy)

18 April 2027 FIFA Women's World Cup qualification	Luxembourg	1–3	Israel	Budaörs, Hungary
18:00	Dos Santos 7'	Report	Kats 10', 34'; Selimhodzic 37'	Stadium: BSC Stadium; Attendance: 0 (behind closed doors); Referee: Jelena Medjedovic (Serbia)

5 June 2027 FIFA Women's World Cup qualification	Scotland	6–0	Israel	Budapest, Hungary (Note: Due to security reasons, Israel played their matches against Scotland behind closed doors on neutral ground.)
18:00	Cuthbert 17'; Weir 20', 57', 67' (pen.); Davidson 81'; Hanson 86'	Report		Stadium: Bozsik Aréna; Attendance: 0 (behind closed doors); Referee: Deborah Anex (Switzerland)

9 June 2027 FIFA Women's World Cup qualification	Israel	1–5	Scotland	Budapest, Hungary
19:00	Kats 56'	Report	Weir 16', 71' (pen.), 79', 90'; Clark 37'	Stadium: Bozsik Aréna; Attendance: 0 (behind closed doors); Referee: Karoline Marie Jensen (Norway)

9 October 2027 FIFA Women's World Cup qualification	Israel	3–7	Switzerland	Mezőkövesd, Hungary (Note: Due to the situation in Israell, Israel will "host" Switzerland behind closed doors on neutral ground.)
18:30	Sommer 20', 35', 53'	Report	Reuteler 14'; Beney 45+1'; Schertenleib 47'; Xhemaili 65', 72'; Kamber 90+1', 90+3'	Stadium: Mezőkövesdi Városi Stadion; Attendance: 0 (behind closed doors); Referee: Sofiya Prychyna (Ukraine)

13 October 2027 FIFA Women's World Cup qualification	Switzerland	2–0 (9–3 agg.)	Israel	Sion, Switzerland
19:30	Beney 30'; Stierli 90+2'	Report		Stadium: Stade de Tourbillon; Attendance: 3,548; Referee: Kirsty Dowle (England)

== Coaching staff ==
=== Current coaching staff ===
- Source: Team Staff of Israel, Football.org.il (in Hebrew)

Position	Name
Head coach	(Israel) Meni Koretski
Assistant coach	(Israel) Dana Kerem
Assistant coach	(Israel) Silvi Jan
Goalkeeping coach	(Israel) Gil Dudi

=== Manager history ===
- (Israel) Rony Schneider (1997–2003)
- (Israel) Alon Schreier (2003–2008)
- (Israel) Meir Nachmias (2008–2017)
- (Israel) Guy Azouri (2017–2019)
- (Argentina) Gabriel Burstein (2019–2021)
- (Israel) Gili Landau (2021–2022)
- (Israel) Sharon Avitan (2022)
- (Israel) Erez Belfer (2022–2024)
- (Israel) Nisso Avitan (2024–2026)
- (Israel) Meni Koretski (2026–)

== Players ==
=== Current squad ===
The following 24-player squad was called up for the 2027 FIFA Women's World Cup qualification games against Switzerland on 9 and 13 October 2026.

Caps and goals are current as of 13 October 2026 after the match against Switzerland.

No.	Pos.	Player	Date of birth (age)	Caps	Goals	Club
1	GK	Amit Beilin	20 August 2000 (age 26)	10	0	(Israel Football Association) Kiryat Gat
18	GK	Agam Haviv	27 January 2005 (age 21)	0	0	(Israel Football Association) Hapoel Tel Aviv
23	GK	Fortuna Rubin	4 June 1996 (age 30)	26	0	(Israel Football Association) Hapoel Ra'anana
2	DF	Hili Shalom	28 April 2003 (age 23)	9	0	(Israel Football Association) Hapoel Katamon Jerusalem
4	DF	Itaf Alkisi	1 October 2001 (age 25)	20	0	(Portuguese Football Federation) Rio Ave
6	DF	Shahar Nakav	12 April 1997 (age 29)	51	0	(Israel Football Association) Kiryat Gat
8	DF	Shani David (captain)	7 June 1991 (age 35)	55	0	(Israel Football Association) Hapoel Ra'anana
9	DF	Tamar Lipsicas Geva	11 September 2008 (age 18)	2	0	(Israel Football Association) Hapoel Katamon Jerusalem
12	DF	Asia Dercksen	20 September 2004 (age 22)	6	0	(Israel Football Association) Hapoel Tel Aviv
16	DF	Or Divan	15 November 2009 (age 17)	2	0	(Israel Football Association) Kiryat Gat
20	DF	Maia Sirota	11 June 2004 (age 22)	2	0	(United States Soccer Federation) UAB Blazers
21	DF	Mia Shvill	9 March 2008 (age 18)	4	0	(Israel Football Association) Hapoel Katamon Jerusalem
5	MF	Elianna Beard	23 May 1996 (age 30)	11	1	Unattached
10	MF	Maia Cabrera	17 July 1999 (age 27)	11	0	(Israel Football Association) Maccabi Kishronot Hadera
11	MF	Zohar Gat	5 January 2005 (age 21)	1	0	(Israel Football Association) Maccabi Kishronot Hadera
13	MF	Zohar Cohen	23 March 2002 (age 24)	5	0	(Israel Football Association) Hapoel Tel Aviv
14	MF	Marian Awad	29 October 1996 (age 30)	42	5	(Israel Football Association) Kiryat Gat
15	MF	Vital Kats	18 November 1999 (age 26)	20	8	(German Football Association) Mainz 05
	MF	Noa Selimhodžić	15 October 2003 (age 23)	40	9	(Portuguese Football Federation) Rio Ave
3	FW	Tal Faingezicht	11 May 2001 (age 25)	7	0	(Israel Football Association) Hapoel Katamon Jerusalem
7	FW	Talia Sommer	19 February 2004 (age 22)	32	9	(United States Soccer Federation) Gotham FC
17	FW	Smadar Cohen	7 April 2006 (age 20)	9	1	(Israel Football Association) Hapoel Katamon Jerusalem
19	FW	Maria Almasri	14 March 2004 (age 22)	19	1	(Israel Football Association) Hapoel Tel Aviv
22	FW	Talma Tal	15 October 2006 (age 20)	2	0	(Israel Football Association) Maccabi ASA Tel Aviv

=== Recent call-ups ===
- The following players received a call-up within the last twelve months.

Pos.	Player	Date of birth (age)	Caps	Goals	Club	Latest call-up
DF	Noa Biton	18 November 2004 (age 21)	0	0	(Israel) Kiryat Gat	v. Luxembourg, 18 April 2026
DF	Reut Revaha	21 May 2000 (age 26)	5	0	(Israel) Maccabi ASA Tel Aviv	v. Luxembourg, 18 April 2026
MF	Michaela Worko	12 October 2006 (age 20)	12	0	(Israel) Hapoel Katamon Jerusalem	v. Switzerland, 9 October 2026^{PRE}
MF	Eden Avital	23 March 2000 (age 26)	51	7	(Israel) Hapoel Tel Aviv	v. Luxembourg, 18 April 2026
MF	Sharon Beck	22 March 1995 (age 31)	24	10	(Germany) Werder Bremen	v. Belgium, 3 March 2026^{PRE}
FW	Rachel Steinschneider	10 February 1994 (age 32)	39	3	(Israel) Hapoel Katamon Jerusalem	v. Switzerland, 9 October 2026^{PRE}
FW	Elis Blokhin	14 January 2002 (age 24)	5	0	(Portugal) Marítimo	v. Scotland, 9 June 2026
FW	Maayan Ben Israel	14 May 2008 (age 18)	6	3	(Israel) Kiryat Gat	v. Luxembourg, 18 April 2026
FW	Shira Elinav	26 April 2000 (age 26)	25	4	(Israel) Hapoel Katamon Jerusalem	v. Belgium, 7 March 2026
FW	Tamar Goren	9 March 2008 (age 18)	0	0	(Germany) Mainz 05	v. Belgium, 7 March 2026

Notes

- ^{INJ} Withdrew due to injury.

== Records ==
- Active players in **bold**, statistics correct as of 25 November 2021.

=== Most capped players ===
- Source: Appearances in the team, Football.org.il (in English)

#	Player	Year(s)	Caps
1	**Karin Sendel**	2005–	68
2	Shay Sade	2009–2019	49
3	Maya Barqui	2002–2016	48
3	Michal Ravitz	2005–2016	48
3	Adva Twil	2008–2015	48
6	**Lee Falkon**	2009–	46
7	Daniel Sofer	2005–2019	40
8	Sarit Shenar	2000–2012	39
9	Rachel Shelina Israel	2005–2016	38
10	Meirav Shamir	2009–2016	36

=== Top goalscorers ===
- Source: All-time scorers in the team, Football.org.il (in English)

#	Player	Year(s)	Goals
1	Silvi Jan	1997–2007	29
2	Sarit Shenar	2000–2012	14
3	**Lee Falkon**	2009–	7
3	Shirley Ohana	2002–2010	7
5	Daniel Sofer	2005–2019	5
5	Inna Didich	2000–2006	5
5	Rachel Shelina Israel	2005–2016	5
8	Meital Dayan	1998–2008	4
9	5 players		3

== Competitive record ==
Champions Runners-up Third place Fourth place

=== FIFA Women's World Cup ===
FIFA Women's World Cup record									Qualification record					
Year	Round	Position	Pld	W	D	L	GF	GA	Pld	W	D	L	GF	GA
(China) 1991	Did not enter								Did not enter					
(Sweden) 1995	Did not enter								Did not enter					
(United States) 1999	Did not qualify								8	1	0	7	6	31
(United States) 2003	Did not qualify								8	4	1	3	12	14
(China) 2007	Did not qualify								6	4	1	1	11	6
(Germany) 2011	Did not qualify								8	2	0	6	4	20
(Canada) 2015	Did not qualify								10	4	0	6	9	27
(France) 2019	Did not qualify								11	2	2	7	9	23
(Australia) (New Zealand) 2023	Did not qualify								10	3	0	7	7	25
(Brazil) 2027	To be determined								To be determined					
(Costa Rica) (Jamaica) (Mexico) (United States) 2031	To be determined								To be determined					
(United Kingdom) 2035	To be determined								To be determined					
Total	—	—	—	—	—	—	—	—	61	20	4	37	58	146

*Draws include knockout matches decided on penalty kicks.

1999 FIFA Women's World Cup qualifier

Israel was entered into the UEFA Group 8 qualifying round, finishing in fourth place.

Standings

Team	Pld	W	D	L	GF	GA	GD	Pts
Romania	8	5	3	0	30	6	+24	18
Slovakia	8	5	2	1	33	5	+28	17
Hungary	8	5	1	2	32	9	+23	16
Israel	8	1	0	7	6	31	−25	3
Bosnia and Herzegovina	8	1	0	7	5	55	−50	3

Matches

2 November 1997

Israel	0–7	Romania

Israel

1 April 1998

Israel	0–4	Slovakia

Israel

8 April 1998

Israel	5–0	Bosnia and Herzegovina

Israel

13 May 1998

Slovakia	5–0	Israel

Slovakia

17 May 1998

Hungary	5–0	Israel

Hungary

15 August 1998

Israel	0–2	Hungary

Israel

18 August 1998

Bosnia and Herzegovina	4–1	Israel

Bosnia and Herzegovina

26 August 1998

Romania	4–0	Israel

Romania

2003 FIFA Women's World Cup qualifier

Israel was entered into the UEFA Group 7 qualifying round, finishing in third place.

Standings

Team	Pld	W	D	L	GF	GA	GD	Pts
Poland	8	8	0	0	25	1	+24	24
Croatia	8	4	1	3	16	11	+5	13
Israel	8	4	1	3	12	14	−2	13
Romania	8	2	2	4	18	13	+5	8
Estonia	8	0	0	8	4	36	−32	0

Matches

6 September 2001

Estonia	2–5	Israel
Mletsin 87'; Morkovkina 89'		Jan 28', 35', 38', 51'; Shenar 32'

Estonia

23 September 2001

Croatia	4–0	Israel
Jakšić 27', 89'; Kozić 38'; Kovač 47'

Croatia

28 October 2001

Israel	1–0	Romania
Jan 9'

Ramat Gan

18 November 2001

Israel	0–2	Poland

Kfar Saba

5 May 2002

Poland	4–0	Israel

Poland

26 May 2002

Romania	1–1	Israel

Romania

4 June 2002

Israel	3–0	Estonia
Didich 48' (pen.); Jan 71'; Shenar 90'

Kyiv

6 June 2002

Israel	2–1	Croatia
Ozeri 5'; Didich 88'		Kovač 2'

Kyiv

2007 FIFA Women's World Cup qualifier

Israel was entered into the UEFA Group 8 qualifying round, finishing in third place.

In addition to Israel competing, Israeli referee Rachel Cohen worked the Group 3 match between Belgium and Finland, and Group 4 between Republic of Ireland and Scotland.

Standings

Team	Pld	W	D	L	GF	GA	GD	Pts
Wales	6	4	2	0	17	2	+15	14
Israel	6	4	1	1	11	6	+5	13
Estonia	6	1	1	4	6	18	−12	4
Moldova	6	1	0	5	5	13	−8	3

Matches

21 August 2005

Estonia	2–5	Israel
Morkovkina 19', 39'		Jan 12', 20', 54'; Shino 70'; Shenar 90+3'

Pärnu
Attendance: 200
Referee: De Boeck (Belgium)

10 November 2005

Israel	2–0	Moldova
Dayan 90+2'; Cohen 90+3'

Haberfeld, Rishon LeZion
Attendance: 200
Referee: Remy (France)

30 March 2006

Wales	1–1	Israel

Wales

7 May 2006

Israel	1–0	Estonia

Israel

11 May 2006

Moldova	0–1	Israel

Moldova

20 August 2006

Israel	1–3	Wales

Netherlands

2011 FIFA Women's World Cup qualifier

Israel was entered into the UEFA Group 6 qualifying round, finishing in fourth place.

In addition to Israel competing, Israeli referee Lilach Asulin worked the Group 1 match between Northern Ireland and Estonia.

Standings

Team	Pld	W	D	L	GF	GA	GD	Pts	Switzerland	Russia	Ireland	Israel	Kazakhstan
Switzerland	8	7	0	1	28	6	+22	21	—	1–2	2–0	6–0	8–0
Russia	8	6	1	1	30	6	+24	19	0–3	—	3–0	4–0	8–0
Republic of Ireland	8	4	1	3	12	10	+2	13	1–2	1–1	—	3–0	2–1
Israel	8	2	0	6	4	24	−20	6	1–2	1–6	0–3	—	1–0
Kazakhstan	8	0	0	8	4	32	−28	0	2–4	0–6	1–2	0–1	—

Legend: Blue = home team win; Yellow = draw; Red = away team win.

Matches

24 October 2009
17:00 UTC+3

Israel	1–0	Kazakhstan
Erez 42'	Report

Ness Ziona Stadium, Ness Ziona
Referee: Laurence Zeien (Luxembourg)

28 October 2009
17:00 UTC+2

Israel	1–2	Switzerland
Abbé 76' (o.g.)	Report	Maendly 55'; Abbé 90+1'

Ness Ziona Stadium, Ness Ziona
Referee: Kateryna Monzul (Ukraine)

17 November 2009
14:00 UTC+2

Israel	1–6	Russia
Cohen 47'	Report	Poryadina 10'; Fomina 29', 89'; Savchenkova 62'; Kurochkina 81'; Kozhnikova 85'

Ramat Gan Stadium, Ramat Gan
Referee: Mihaela Gurdon Bašimamović (Croatia)

21 March 2010
17:00 UTC+2

Israel	0–3	Republic of Ireland
	Report	O'Sullivan 32', 52'; O'Brien 81'

Ness Ziona Stadium, Ness Ziona
Referee: Ann-Helen Østervold (Norway)

27 March 2010
16:00 UTC+1

Switzerland	6–0	Israel
Abbé 8', 64'; Barqui 14' (o.g.); Stein 68'; Dickenmann 71'; Crnogorcevic 90+3'	Report

Stadion Niedermatten, Wohlen
Referee: Gordana Kuzmanović (Serbia)

19 June 2010
16:00 UTC+6

Kazakhstan	0–1	Israel
	Report	Sofer 71'

Astana Arena, Astana
Referee: Monica Mularczyk (Poland)

24 June 2010
18:00 UTC+4

Russia	4–0	Israel
Kurochkina 5' (pen.); Skotnikova 24'; Kozhnikova 31'; Sochneva 80'	Report

Krasnoarmeysk Stadium, Krasnoarmeysk
Referee: Alexandra Ihringova (England)

25 August 2010
19:30 UTC+1

Republic of Ireland	3–0	Israel
O'Sullivan 59', 64', 80'	Report

Carlisle Grounds, Bray
Referee: Elia María Martínez Martínez (Spain)

Roster

Coach: Meir Nachmias

- Merav Shamir
- Michal Ravitz
- Moran Lavi
- Adva Tawil
- Sarit Shenar
- Tal Shino
- Moran Fridman
- Or Erez
- Shirli Ohana
- Oshrat Eni
- Tali Hanan
- Sapir Kadori
- Shay Sade
- Naama Cohen
- Lee Sima Falkon
- Ortal Shamilov
- Yifat Cohen
- Sivan Fhima

Goalscorers

1 goal

- Or Erez
- Caroline Abbé
- Yifat Cohen
- Danielle Sofer
2015 FIFA Women's World Cup qualifier

Israel competed in the UEFA Group 3 qualifying round, finishing in fourth place.

In addition to Israel competing, Israeli referee Lilach Asulin worked the Group 1 match between Slovenia and Republic of Ireland, Group 4 between Northern Ireland and Faroe Islands, Group 5 between Albania and Belgium, and Group 7 between Bulgaria and Finland.

Standings

Pos	Team	Pld	W	D	L	GF	GA	GD	Pts	Qualification	Switzerland	Iceland	Denmark	Israel	Serbia	Malta
1	Switzerland	10	9	1	0	53	1	+52	28	Women's World Cup	—	3–0	1–1	9–0	9–0	11–0
2	Iceland	10	6	1	3	29	9	+20	19		0–2	—	0–1	3–0	9–1	5–0
3	Denmark	10	5	3	2	25	6	+19	18		0–1	1–1	—	0–1	3–1	8–0
4	Israel	10	4	0	6	9	27	−18	12		0–5	0–1	0–5	—	3–1	2–0
5	Serbia	10	3	1	6	16	34	−18	10		0–7	1–2	1–1	3–0	—	5–0
6	Malta	10	0	0	10	0	55	−55	0		0–5	0–8	0–5	0–3 (Note: Israel were awarded a 3–0 win. The match originally ended 2–0 to Israel.)	0–3	—

Source: UEFA
Rules for classification: Tiebreakers
Notes:

Matches

27 October 2013
13:00

Israel	2–0	Malta
Sofer 51'; Shelina 60'	Report

Ramat Gan Stadium, Ramat Gan
Attendance: 110
Referee: Hilal Tuba Tosun (Turkey)

24 November 2013
18:00

Israel	3–1	Serbia
Fridman 26'; Falkon 38'; Sofer 67'	Report	Podovac 3' (pen.)

Ramat Gan Stadium, Ramat Gan
Attendance: 270
Referee: Marija Kurtes (Germany)

12 February 2014
16:00

Israel	0–5	Switzerland
	Report	Humm 6', 28', 36'; Dickenmann 45' (pen.); Crnogorčević 90+3'

HaMoshava Stadium, Petach-Tikva
Attendance: 100
Referee: Teodora Albon (Romania)

5 April 2014
19:30

Israel	0–1	Iceland
	Report	Brynjarsdóttir 60'

Ramat Gan Stadium, Ramat Gan
Attendance: 100
Referee: Monika Mularczyk (Poland)

7 May 2014
14:00

Malta	0–3 Awarded (Note: Israel were awarded a 3–0 win. The match originally ended 2–0 to Israel.)	Israel
	Report	M. Fridman 36'; Lavi 60'

Ta' Qali National Stadium, Ta' Qali
Attendance: 157
Referee: Olga Zadinová (Czech Republic)

14 June 2014
16:00

Switzerland	9–0	Israel
Humm 29'; Kiwic 32'; Bachmann 35', 39'; Moser 37'; Bürki 59', 84', 86'; Abbé 90+1'	Report

Stadion Niedermatten, Wohlen
Attendance: 950
Referee: Katalin Kulcsár (Hungary)

19 June 2014
17:00

Israel	0–5	Denmark
	Report	Nielsen 35', 86'; Harder 48'; Troelsgaard 56'; Pedersen 90+3'

Ramat Gan Stadium, Ramat Gan
Attendance: 150
Referee: Morag Pirie (Scotland)

21 August 2014
17:00

Serbia	3–0	Israel
Smiljković 31', 34'; Bradić 82'	Report

Suvača Sportcenter, Pećinci
Attendance: 200
Referee: Aneliya Sinabova (Bulgaria)

13 September 2014
19:00

Iceland	3–0	Israel
Brynjarsdóttir 2'; Friðriksdóttir 26'; Gunnarsdóttir 90+1'	Report

Laugardalsvöllur, Reykjavík
Attendance: 622
Referee: Gyöngyi Gaál (Hungary)

17 September 2014
18:00

Denmark	0–1	Israel
	Report	Falkon 10'

Vejle Stadion, Vejle
Attendance: 657
Referee: Anastasia Pustovoitova (Russia)

Current squad

Coach: Meir Nachmias

- Hanit Schwartz
- Mairav Shamir
- Maya Barqui
- Na'ama Cohen
- Shani David
- Moran Fridman
- Michal Ravitz
- Shay Sade (Captain)
- Daniel Sofer
- Lee Falkon
- Tal Isaev
- Moran Lavi
- Shir Levo
- Diana Redman
- Sapir Sarusi
- Karin Sendel (Captain)
- Arava Shahaf
- Adva Twil
- Shelly Israel
- Roni Shimrich

Goalscorers

2 goals

- Lee Falkon
- Moran Fridman
- Daniel Sofer

1 goal

- Rachel Shelina Israel
- Moran Lavi

=== UEFA Women's Championship ===
UEFA Women's Championship record									Qualification record							
Year	Round	Position	Pld	W	D	L	GF	GA	Pld	W	D	L	GF	GA	P/R	Rnk
(Denmark) 1991	Did not enter								Did not enter							
(Italy) 1993	Did not enter								Did not enter							
(Germany) 1995	Did not enter								Did not enter							
(Norway) 1997	Did not enter								Did not enter							
(Germany) 2001	Did not qualify								8	2	0	6	5	26	–	
(England) 2005	Did not qualify								6	3	2	1	20	6	–	
(Finland) 2009	Did not qualify								11	3	1	7	12	35	–	
(Sweden) 2013	Did not qualify								8	0	0	8	1	36	–	
(Netherlands) 2017	Did not qualify								6	0	2	4	2	9	–	
(England) 2022	Did not qualify								10	2	1	7	10	30	–	
(Switzerland) 2025	Did not qualify								6	0	1	5	5	18	▼ (Note: From Euro 2025 onwards a new qualifying format was introduced, linked to the Women's Nations League where teams are divided into leagues with promotion/relegation between the leagues at the end of each cycle.)	31st
(Germany) 2029	To be determined								To be determined							
Total	—	—	—	—	—	—	—	—	55	10	7	38	55	160	31st	

*Draws include knockout matches decided on penalty kicks.

2001 UEFA Women's Championship qualifier

Israel was entered into the Group 7 qualifying round, finishing in fourth place.

Standings

Team	Pld	W	D	L	GF	GA	GD	Pts
Romania	8	7	1	0	34	5	+29	22
Belarus	8	5	1	2	20	9	+11	16
Slovakia	8	5	0	3	23	10	+13	15
Israel	8	2	0	6	5	26	−21	6
Estonia	8	0	0	8	6	38	−32	0

Matches

17 September 1999

Israel	0–5	Belarus

Israel

19 October 1999

Israel	2–1	Estonia

Israel

31 October 1999

Israel	0–4	Romania

Israel

16 November 1999

Israel	0–5	Slovakia

Israel

25 April 2000

Slovakia	4–0	Israel

Slovakia

6 June 2000

Romania	5–1	Israel

Romania

27 June 2000

Estonia	1–2	Israel

Estonia

5 July 2000

Belarus	1–0	Israel

Belarus

Goalscorers

2 goals

- Inna Didich

1 goal

- Silvi Jan
- Keren Knafo
- Sarit Shenar
2005 UEFA Women's Championship qualifier

Israel was entered into the Group 6 qualifying round, finishing in second place.

Standings

Team	Pld	W	D	L	GF	GA	GD	Pts
Belarus	6	5	1	0	21	3	+18	16
Israel	6	3	2	1	20	6	+14	11
Estonia	6	1	1	4	6	26	−20	4
Kazakhstan	6	0	2	4	4	16	−12	2
Wales	0	0	0	0	0	0	0	0

Matches

10 August 2003

Estonia	1–4	Israel
Pajo 34'	Report	Kochen 10'; Dayan 18'; Jan 44'; Shenar 53'

Estonia

14 September 2003

Kazakhstan	0–0	Israel
	Report

Kazakhstan

18 October 2003

Belarus	1–1	Israel
Lis 89'	Report	Liran 78'

Belarus

9 May 2004

Israel	12–1	Estonia
Israel 6'; Didich 12'; Ohana 29', 65', 76'; Jan 46', 62', 68', 71', 84'; Dayan 49', 66'	Report	Vaher 69'

Israel

30 May 2004

Israel	3–1	Kazakhstan
Fahima 23'; Jan 44' (pen.); Dayan 56'	Report	Yalova 38'

Israel

2 October 2004

Israel	0–2	Belarus
	Report	Kuzniatsova 42', 90+2'

Israel

Goalscorers

7 goals

- Silvi Jan

4 goals

- Meital Dayan

3 goals

- Shirley Ohana

1 goal

- Tamara Kochen
- Sarit Shenar
- Inna Didich
- Rachel Shelina Israel
- Ayala Truelove
2009 UEFA Women's Championship qualifier
Preliminary round – Group A2

Standings

Team	Pld	W	D	L	GF	GA	GD	Pts
Israel	3	3	0	0	9	2	+7	9
Bosnia and Herzegovina	3	1	1	1	7	7	0	4
Armenia	3	1	1	1	2	2	0	4
Latvia	3	0	0	3	1	8	−7	0

Matches

18 November 2006
11:00 CET

Israel	3–0	Latvia
Gian 28'; Fhima 32'; Shenar 70'	Report

Stadion Grbavica, Sarajevo
Referee: Berta Tavares (Portugal)

20 November 2006
11:00 CET

Israel	1–0	Armenia
Shenar 5'	Report

Asim Ferhatović Hase Stadium, Sarajevo
Referee: Berta Tavares (Portugal)

23 November 2006
11:00 CET

Bosnia and Herzegovina	2–5	Israel
Škrbić 27'; Fetahović 46'	Report	Gian 13'; Shenar 23', 40', 81', 89'

Asim Ferhatović Hase Stadium, Sarajevo
Referee: Silvia Spinelli (Italy)

Goalscorers

6 goals

- Sarit Shenar

2 goals

- Silvi Jan

1 goal

- Sivan Fahima
Qualifying stage – Group 6

Standings

Team	Pld	W	D	L	GF	GA	GD	Pts
Norway	8	7	1	0	26	0	+26	22
Russia	8	6	1	1	25	7	+18	19
Austria	8	3	0	5	13	18	−5	9
Poland	8	2	1	5	11	20	−9	7
Israel	8	0	1	7	3	33	−30	1

Matches

10 May 2007
17:00 CEST

Israel	2–2	Poland
Erez 32'; Shelina 38'	Report	Żelazko 30'; Rytwińska 41'

Winter, Ramat Gan
Referee: Hilal Tuba Tosun (Turkey)

30 May 2007
17:00 CEST

Israel	0–6	Russia
	Report	Kurochkina 29'; Kremleva 45'; Mokshanova 54' 59' 70'; Chmatchkova 79'

Ramat Gan Stadium, Ramat Gan
Referee: Anja Kunick (Germany)

17 June 2007
17:00 CEST

Israel	0–3	Norway
	Report	Gulbrandsen 50' 73'; Wiik 78'

Ramat Gan Stadium, Ramat Gan
Referee: Yelena Savchenko (Kazakhstan)

21 June 2007
17:00 CEST

Poland	4–1	Israel
Stobba 1' 25'; Gawrońska 34'; Maciaszczyk 44'	Report	Ohana 60'

City Stadium, Kutno
Referee: Tetyana Aseeva (Ukraine)

26 August 2007
17:00 CEST

Austria	5–0	Israel
Wenninger 5'; Burger 48' 72' 90'; Celouch 74'	Report

Sparkassenstadion Gleisdorf, Gleisdorf
Referee: Lena Arwedahl (Sweden)

3 May 2008
16:00 CEST

Norway	7–0	Israel
Wiik 12' 45'; Gulbrandsen 19' 82'; Mykjåland 52'; Christensen 54'; Nordby 75' (pen.)	Report

Sør Arena, Kristiansand
Referee: Carla De Boeck (Belgium)

29 May 2008
15:00 CEST

Russia	4–0	Israel
Letyushova 9' 22'; Mokshanova 59' (pen.); Barbashina 67'	Report

Stadion Krasnoarmeysk, Krasnoarmeysk
Referee: Esther Staubli (Switzerland)

25 June 2008
16:00 CEST

Israel	0–2	Austria
	Report	Tieber 9'; Burger 43'

Beit She'an Municipal, Beit She'an
Referee: Marija Damjanovic (Croatia)

Goalscorers

1 goal

- Or Erez
- Rachel Shelina Israel
- Shirli Ohana
2013 UEFA Women's Championship qualifier

Israel was entered into the Group 4 qualifying round, finishing in fourth place.

Standings

Team	Pld	W	D	L	GF	GA	GD	Pts	Qualification
France	8	8	0	0	32	2	+30	24	Qualified for UEFA Women's Euro 2013
Scotland	8	5	1	2	21	12	+9	16	Competes in Play-off round
Wales	8	3	1	4	12	14	−2	10	
Republic of Ireland	8	3	0	5	8	11	−3	9	
Israel	8	0	0	8	1	36	−35	0	

Matches

14 September 2011
20:45

Israel	0–5	France
	Report	Eni 5' (o.g.); Franco 62'; Abily 71'; Le Sommer 86'; Delie 87'

Ness Ziona Stadium, Ness Ziona
Attendance: 137
Referee: Carina Vitulano (Italy)

12 October 2011
11:00

Israel	1–6	Scotland
Lavi 35'	Report	Ross 5'; Beattie 9'; Little 48', 57'; Lauder 69'; Ravitz 72' (o.g.)

Ness Ziona Stadium, Ness Ziona
Attendance: 130
Referee: Ausra Kance (Lithuania)

22 October 2011
16:00

Republic of Ireland	2–0	Israel
D. O'Sullivan 74'; Grant 87'	Report

Tallaght Stadium, Dublin
Attendance: 1,010
Referee: Petra Chudá (Slovakia)

26 October 2011
20:45

France	5–0	Israel
Thiney 15', 37', 38'; Bompastor 22' (pen.); Rubio 90'	Report

Stade de l'Aube, Troyes
Attendance: 10,159
Referee: Lina Lehtovaara (Finland)

20 November 2011
16:00

Israel	0–2	Wales
	Report	Lander 8'; Ingle 88'

Ness Ziona Stadium, Ness Ziona
Attendance: 50
Referee: Caroline De Boeck (Belgium)

16 June 2012
16:00

Scotland	8–0	Israel
Lauder 1'; Little 6', 25', 44'; Sneddon 9'; Love 15'; J. Ross 28'; Corsie 83'	Report

Tynecastle Stadium, Edinburgh
Attendance: 817
Referee: Pernilla Larsson (Sweden)

20 June 2012
19:00

Wales	5–0	Israel
Harding 3', 28', 36'; Wiltshire 50'; Keryakoplis 72'	Report

Racecourse Ground, Wrexham
Attendance: 721
Referee: Karolina Radzik-Johan (Poland)

19 September 2012
15:00

Israel	0–2	Republic of Ireland
	Report	O'Sullivan 65'; Russell 67'

Ramat Gan Stadium, Ramat Gan
Attendance: 132
Referee: Paloma Quintero Siles (Spain)

Goalscorers

1 goal

- Moran Lavi

1 own goal

- Oshrat Eni
- Michal Ravitz

Roster

Coach: Meir Nachmias

- Merav Shamir
- Michal Ravitz
- Diana Redman
- Naama Cohen
- Sarit Shenar
- Rachel Shelina
- Adva Tawil
- Moran Fridman
- Oshrat Eni
- Moran Lavi
- Lee Sima Falkon
- Sapir Kadori
- Tal Isaev
- Yifat Cohen
- Tal Mahlev
- Maya Barqui
- Tal Shino
- Tal Sofer
2017 UEFA Women's Championship qualifier

Israel was entered into the Group 8 qualifying round, and finished in last place.

Standings

Pos	Team	Pld	W	D	L	GF	GA	GD	Pts	Qualification
1	Norway	8	7	1	0	29	2	+27	22	Final tournament
2	Austria	8	5	2	1	18	4	+14	17	Final tournament
3	Wales	8	3	2	3	13	11	+2	11	
4	Kazakhstan	8	1	1	6	2	30	−28	4	
5	Israel	8	0	2	6	2	17	−15	2	

Source: UEFA
Rules for classification: Qualification tiebreakers

Matches

22 October 2015
18:00

Israel	0–0	Kazakhstan
	Report

Lod Municipal Stadium, Lod
Attendance: 100
Referee: Ivana Martinčić (Croatia)

25 October 2015
18:00

Israel	0–1	Austria
	Report	Prohaska 48'

Lod Municipal Stadium, Lod
Attendance: 70
Referee: Karolina Radzik-Johan (Poland)

1 December 2015
14:00

Israel	2–2	Wales
Falkon 25'; Shelina 83'	Report	Harding 59', 80'

Ramat Gan Stadium, Ramat Gan
Attendance: 120
Referee: Marta Frias Acedo (Spain)

6 April 2016
16:00

Israel	0–1	Norway
	Report	Ad. Hegerberg 25'

Ramat Gan Stadium, Ramat Gan
Attendance: 192
Referee: Sabine Bonnin (France)

2 June 2016
14:00

Kazakhstan	1–0	Israel
Yalova 69'	Report

BIIK Stadium, Shymkent
Attendance: 550
Referee: Galiya Echeva (Bulgaria)

6 June 2016
19:00

Austria	4–0	Israel
Burger 4', 19'; Barqui 41' (o.g.); Kirchberger 78'	Report

Waldviertler Volksbank Arena, Horn
Attendance: 1,100
Referee: Sofia Karagiorgi (Cyprus)

15 September 2016
20:05

Wales	3–0	Israel
Ward 16', 32'; Estcourt 59'	Report

Rodney Parade, Newport
Referee: Eszter Urban (Hungary)

19 September 2016
17:55

Norway	5–0	Israel
Ad. Hegerberg 43', 48', 52'; Bøe Risa 71'; Herlovsen 80'	Report

Høddvoll Stadion, Ulsteinvik
Referee: Paula Brady (Republic of Ireland)

Goalscorers

1 goal

- Lee Falkon
- Rachel Shelina Israel

1 own goal

- Maya Barqui

Roster

No.	Pos.	Player	Date of birth (age)	Caps	Goals	Club
	GK	Hanit Schwartz	23 October 1987 (age 39)	15	0	(Israel Football Association) F.C. Ramat HaSharon
	GK	Mairav Shamir	18 January 1988 (age 38)	32	0	(German Football Association) MSV Duisburg
	DF	Maya Barqui	22 September 1985 (age 41)	45	0	(Israel Football Association) Maccabi Kishronot Hadera
	DF	Shani David	7 June 1991 (age 35)	8	0	(Israel Football Association) F.C. Ramat HaSharon
	DF	Moran Fridman	30 January 1990 (age 36)	38	2	Unattached
	DF	Shahar Nakav	12 April 1997 (age 29)	7	0	Unattached
	DF	Shai Pearl	1 March 1997 (age 29)	6	0	(Israel Football Association) F.C. Ramat HaSharon
	DF	Michal Ravitz	21 August 1986 (age 40)	44	0	(Israel Football Association) Maccabi Kishronot Hadera
	DF	Shay Sade	16 April 1990 (age 36)	32	1	(Israel Football Association) F.C. Ramat HaSharon
	DF	Daniel Sofer	14 January 1988 (age 38)	23	3	(Israel Football Association) Maccabi Kishronot Hadera
	MF	Lee Falkon	7 May 1992 (age 34)	32	5	(German Football Association) MSV Duisburg
	MF	Shir Levo	25 June 1988 (age 38)	7	0	(Israel Football Association) F.C. Kiryat Gat
	MF	Alina Metkalov	17 March 1998 (age 28)	2	0	Unattached
	MF	Diana Redman	2 July 1984 (age 42)	24	0	(Royal Spanish Football Federation) Santa Teresa CD
	MF	Karin Sendel	26 October 1988 (age 38)	36	0	(Israel Football Association) F.C. Ramat HaSharon
	MF	Arava Shahaf	28 April 1990 (age 36)	17	1	(Israel Football Association) F.C. Ramat HaSharon
	MF	Opal Sofer	20 May 1996 (age 30)	1	0	(Israel Football Association) F.C. Ramat HaSharon
	MF	Adva Twil	26 June 1985 (age 41)	37	0	(Israel Football Association) F.C. Ramat HaSharon
	FW	Eden Avital	25 March 1997 (age 29)	6	0	(Israel Football Association) ASA Tel Aviv
	FW	Mor Efraim	18 January 1988 (age 38)	3	0	(Israel Football Association) F.C. Kiryat Gat
	FW	Roni Shimrich	15 August 1993 (age 33)	7	0	(Israel Football Association) F.C. Ramat HaSharon

=== UEFA Women's Nations League ===
UEFA Women's Nations League record
Year	League	Group	Pos	Pld	W	D	L	GF	GA	P/R	Rnk
2023–24	C	4	1st	6	5	1	0	21	2	▲	35th
2025	C	5	1st	4	3	1	0	12	5	▲	34th
Total				10	8	2	0	33	7	35th and 34th	

▲	Promoted at end of season
Same position	No movement at end of season
▼	Relegated at end of season
*	Participated in promotion/relegation play-offs

== See also ==
- Sport in Israel
  - Football in Israel
    - Women's football in Israel
- Israel women's national under-19 football team
- Israel women's national under-17 football team
- Israel national football team
