= Maria Almasri =

Israeli footballer (born 2004)

Personal information
- Date of birth: 14 March 2004 (age 22)
- Place of birth: Israel
- Position: Forward

Team information
- Current team: Hapoel Tel Aviv

Youth career
- 2015–2017: Orthodox Jaffa
- 2017–2018: Hapoel Petah Tikva
- 2018–2019: Girls Football Academy
- 2019–2020: Hapoel Petah Tikva

Senior career*
| Years | Team | Apps | (Gls) |
| 2020–2022 | Maccabi Kishronot Hadera | 29 | (10) |
| 2022–2023 | Grenoble Foot 38 | | |
| 2023–2024 | ASA Tel Aviv University | 23 | (7) |
| 2024–2025 | 1. FFC Turbine Potsdam | 2 | (2) |
| 2025–2026 | SC Sand | 14 | (0) |
| 2026– | Hapoel Tel Aviv | 2 | (1) |

International career^{‡}
| 2019–2022 | Israel U17 | | |
| 2022 | Israel U19 | | |
| 2022– | Israel | 19 | (1) |
- * Club domestic league appearances and goals as of 11 October 2026 ‡ National team caps and goals as of 15 October 2026

Maria Almasri (Hebrew: מריה אלמסרי, Arabic: ماريا المصري; born 14 March 2004) is an Israeli professional footballer who plays as a striker for Hapoel Tel Aviv and the Israeli national team.

== Club career ==
Almasri played for Orthodox Jaffa, Hapoel Petah Tikva and The Girls' Soccer Academy of Wingate Institute in youth level. She started her senior career at Maccabi Kishronot Hadera in 2020. In summer 2022, she signed for French club Grenoble Foot 38. In January 2023, she returned to Israel to play for ASA Tel Aviv University. In January 2024, she joined German side Turbine Potsdam. In May 2025, following the club's relegation to the 2. Frauen-Bundesliga, Almasri was released along with fellow Israelis Irena Kuznetsov, Noa Selimhodzic, and Shahar Nakav. Four months later, in September 2025, Almasri joined 2. Frauen-Bundesliga club SC Sand.

== International career ==
Almasri made her debut for the Israeli national team on 1 September 2022 in a 2–0 victory over Bulgaria during the 2023 World Cup qualification. On 2 December 2023, she scored her first international goal in a 6–1 victory over Armenia during the UEFA Nations League.
