= Shahar Nakav =

Israeli footballer (born 1997)

Shahar Nakav שחר נקב
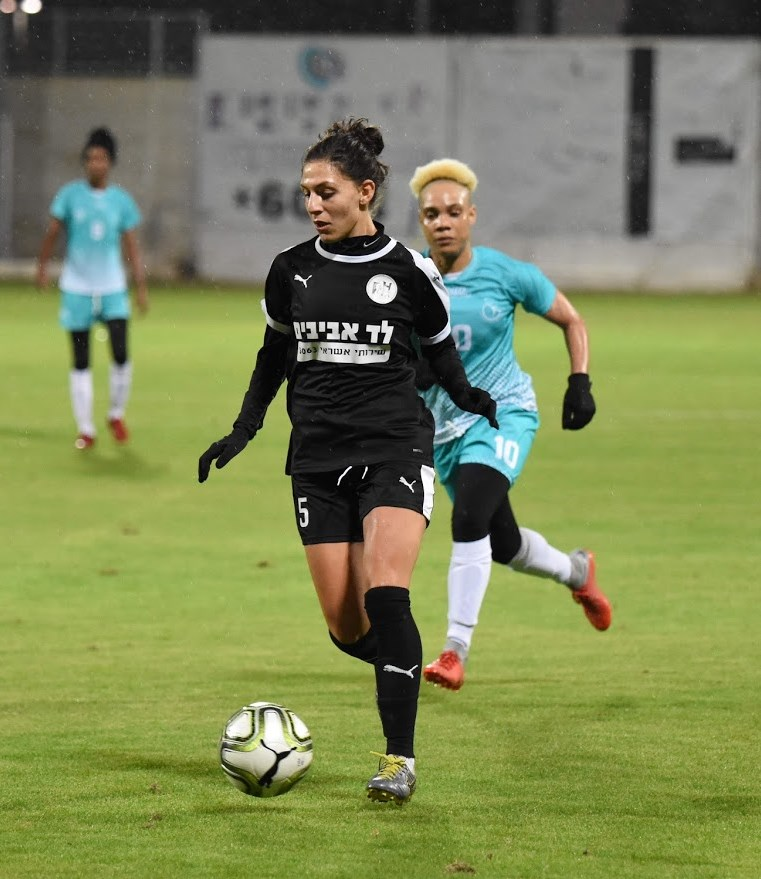
- Nakav playing in 2019

Personal information
- Date of birth: 12 April 1997 (age 29)
- Place of birth: Beersheba, Israel
- Position: Defender

Team information
- Current team: Kiryat Gat

Youth career
- 2009–2012: Maccabi Be'er Sheva
- 2012–2014: Girls Football Academy

Senior career*
Years	Team	Apps	(Gls)
2014–2017	Girls Football Academy	53	(5)
2017–2019	Kiryat Gat	47	(1)
2019–2020	Ramat HaSharon	13	(0)
2020–2024	Kiryat Gat	79	(3)
2024–2025	Turbine Potsdam	2	(0)
2025–	Kiryat Gat	10	(0)

International career^{‡}
2012–2013	Israel U17	11	(0)
2014–2015	Israel U19	11	(0)
2015–	Israel	51	(0)
- * Club domestic league appearances and goals as of 11 October 2026 ‡ National team caps and goals as of 15 October 2026

Shahar Nakav (or Sahar, Hebrew: שחר נקב; born 12 April 1997) is an Israeli footballer who plays as a defender for Ligat Nashim club Kiryat Gat and the Israel women's national team.

Born in Beersheba, Nakav began her youth career with Maccabi Be'er Sheva before joining the Israel Football Association's Girls Football Academy at the Wingate Institute in 2012. She made her senior debut with the academy before securing a transfer to Kiryat Gat in 2017. Across two spells with Kiryat Gat, where she also served as a co-captain, and a one-year stint with Ramat HaSharon, Nakav won five Ligat Nashim titles and three Israeli Women's Cups. In 2024, she joined German Frauen-Bundesliga side Turbine Potsdam, before returning to Kiryat Gat in 2025.

At international level, Nakav represented Israel at youth level, notably starting at the 2015 UEFA Women's Under-19 Championship in memory of her late sister, and has since earned senior caps for the Israel national team.

== Club career ==
=== Early career ===
Nakav grew up in Beersheba, where she was scouted by the manager of Maccabi Be'er Sheva during a local youth tournament. She joined the club's youth team in 2009. In 2012, she was selected by the Israel Football Association to join the newly established Girls Football Academy at the Wingate Institute, a full-time residential boarding school formed to develop the national youth squad ahead of the 2015 UEFA Women's Under-19 Championship. Nakav made her senior debut for the academy's team in 2014, making 53 appearances and scoring 5 goals over three seasons.

During her time at the academy, Nakav's older sister, Chen, battled cancer and passed away in early 2015. Despite contemplating quitting football to be with her family, Nakav was encouraged by her sister to continue pursuing a professional career. Immediately following the shiva, Nakav rejoined the national team for a preparation tournament in Russia, credited by her as essential for coping with the loss. Later that year, she served as a starting center-back for Israel at the 2015 UEFA Women's Under-19 Championship, playing the tournament in memory of her sister.

=== Kiryat Gat ===
Nakav joined Kiryat Gat ahead of the 2017–18 season. In her debut season with the club, she starred in the defence and won her first domestic league title. Following the season, she was selected in the "Team of the Season", being described as an impassable wall. She remained with Kiryat Gat for another year, narrowly missing out on a consecutive title to ASA Tel Aviv by just a single point.

=== Ramat HaSharon ===
For the 2019–20 season, Nakav signed with Ramat HaSharon. Her stint with the team was disrupted by the COVID-19 pandemic in Israel, which forced the league's premature suspension in March 2020. On 13 April 2020, Ramat HaSharon was officially declared champion as they held a five-point lead at the top of the standings at the time of the shutdown.

=== Return to Kiryat Gat ===
Following the pandemic-shortened season, Nakav returned to Kiryat Gat. She had a highly successful period at the club, where she served as one of the club's co-captains and over four seasons anchored the defense and led Kiryat Gat to four consecutive league championships and three Israeli Women's Cups.

Nakav also represented Kiryat Gat in the 2022–23 UEFA Women's Champions League qualifying rounds in Turin, Italy. Ahead of their opening match against Estonian champions Flora Tallinn, Nakav highlighted the team's tactical focus on defensive wing-play to counteract Flora's flank-heavy attack. Kiryat Gat went on to defeat Flora 5–0, with Nakav scoring the final goal in the 84th minute, and they advanced to the final of the mini-tournament against Juventus. Describing the matchup against the Italian champions as a "David vs. Goliath" challenge, Nakav noted it as a pinnacle benchmark for her career alongside her experiences with the national team. Despite a respectable performance, Kiryat Gat ultimately lost the final match 3–1 to Juventus.

=== Turbine Potsdam ===
In July 2024, Nakav secured her first international move, joining fellow Israelis Irena Kuznetsov, Maria Almasri, and Noa Selimhodzic at newly promoted Frauen-Bundesliga club Turbine Potsdam. In May 2025, following the club's relegation to the 2. Frauen-Bundesliga, Nakav was released, along with her three fellow Israelis, as part of a squad clear out.

=== Return to Israel ===
In September 2025, Nakav returned to Israel and re-joined Kiryat Gat, alongside Noa Selimhodzic.

== International career ==
Nakav was capped for the Israel national team, appearing for the team during the 2019 FIFA Women's World Cup qualifying cycle.
