= Nisso Avitan =

Israeli footballer (born 1971)

Nisso Avitan ניסו אביטן
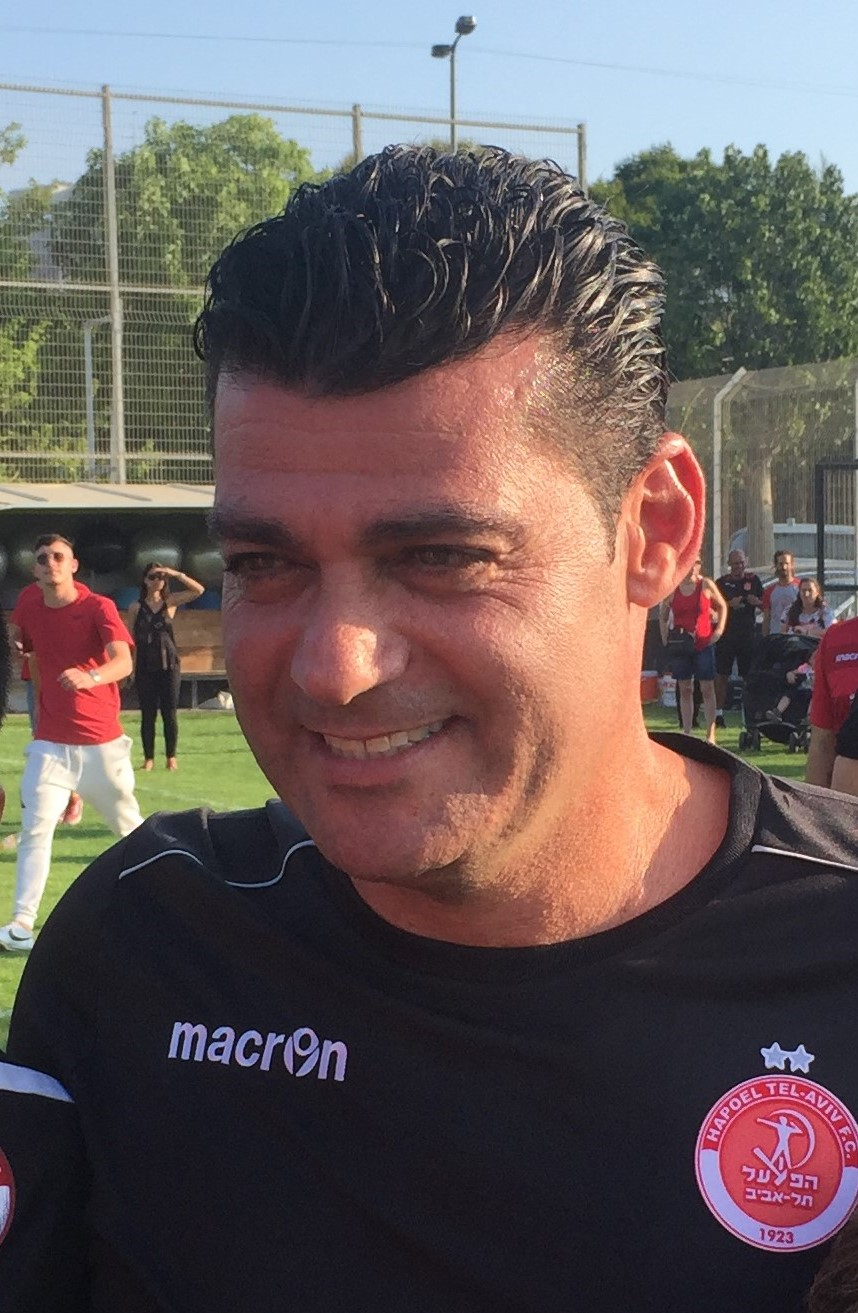
- Avitan in 2019

Personal information
- Date of birth: 29 September 1971
- Place of birth: Israel

Team information
- Current team: Hapoel Hadera (manager)

Managerial career
- Years: Team
- 2017–2019: Hapoel Hadera
- 2019: Hapoel Tel Aviv
- 2019–2020: Hapoel Ra'anana
- 2020–2021: Bnei Sakhnin
- 2022: Bnei Yehuda
- 2023–2024: Hapoel Hadera
- 2024–2025: Israel (women)
- 2026–: Hapoel Hadera

Nisso Avitan (Hebrew: ניסו אביטן; born 29 September 1971) is an Israeli football manager and former player. He is the manager of Liga Leumit side Hapoel Hadera.

== Career ==
Avitan started his managerial career with Israeli side Hapoel Hadera. He helped the club achieve promotion. In 2019, he was appointed manager of Israeli side Hapoel Tel Aviv. After that, he was appointed manager of Israeli side Hapoel Ra'anana. He suffered relegation while managing the club. In 2020, he was appointed manager of Israeli side Bnei Sakhnin. In 2022, he was appointed manager of Israeli side Bnei Yehuda. In 2023, he returned as manager to Israeli side Hapoel Hadera.
