= Michal Ravitz =

Israeli footballer

Michal Ravitz מיכל רביץ
Personal information
- Full name: Michal Ravitz Lurie
- Date of birth: 21 August 1986 (age 40)
- Place of birth: Haifa, Israel
- Position: Defender

Team information
- Current team: Maccabi Kishronot Hadera
- Number: 2

Senior career*
Years	Team	Apps	(Gls)
2001–2004	Maccabi Haifa		
2004–2011	Maccabi Holon		
2006–2007	Incarnate Word Cardinals	33	(1)
2009	St. Mary's Rattlers	13	(2)
2011–2013	ASA Tel Aviv University	33	(1)
2013–2015	Maccabi Kishronot Hadera	38	(1)

International career^{‡}
2002–2005	Israel U-19	11	(1)
2005–2016	Israel	48	(0)
- * Club domestic league appearances and goals as of 7 November 2015 ‡ National team caps and goals as of 6 December 2021

Michal Ravitz Lurie (Hebrew: מיכל רביץ לוריא; born 21 August 1986) is an Israeli football defender.

== Club career ==
Ravitz had played in the Israeli First League for Maccabi Haifa, Maccabi Holon, ASA Tel Aviv University and Maccabi Kishronot Hadera, winning 8 league championships and 8 national cups and playing in UEFA Women's Champions League. Ravitz also Attended University of the Incarnate Word in 2006 and 2007 and St Mary's University, missing 2008 through injury.

== International career ==
Ravitz played for the national team since 2005, appearing in 37 matches. Previously, between 2002 and 2005, Ravitz played for the U-19 national team, appearing in 11 matches, scoring 1 goal.

== Honours ==
- Championships (8):
  - With Maccabi Haifa: 2001–02
  - With Maccabi Holon: 2004–05, 2005–06, 2006–07, 2008–09
  - With ASA Tel Aviv University: 2010–11, 2011–12, 2012–13
- Cup (8):
  - With Maccabi Haifa: 2001–02
  - With Maccabi Holon: 2004–05, 2005–06, 2006–07, 2008–09, 2009–10
  - With ASA Tel Aviv University: 2011–12
  - With Maccabi Kishronot Hadera: 2014–15
