= Amit Beilin =

Israeli footballer

Amit Beilin עמית ביילין
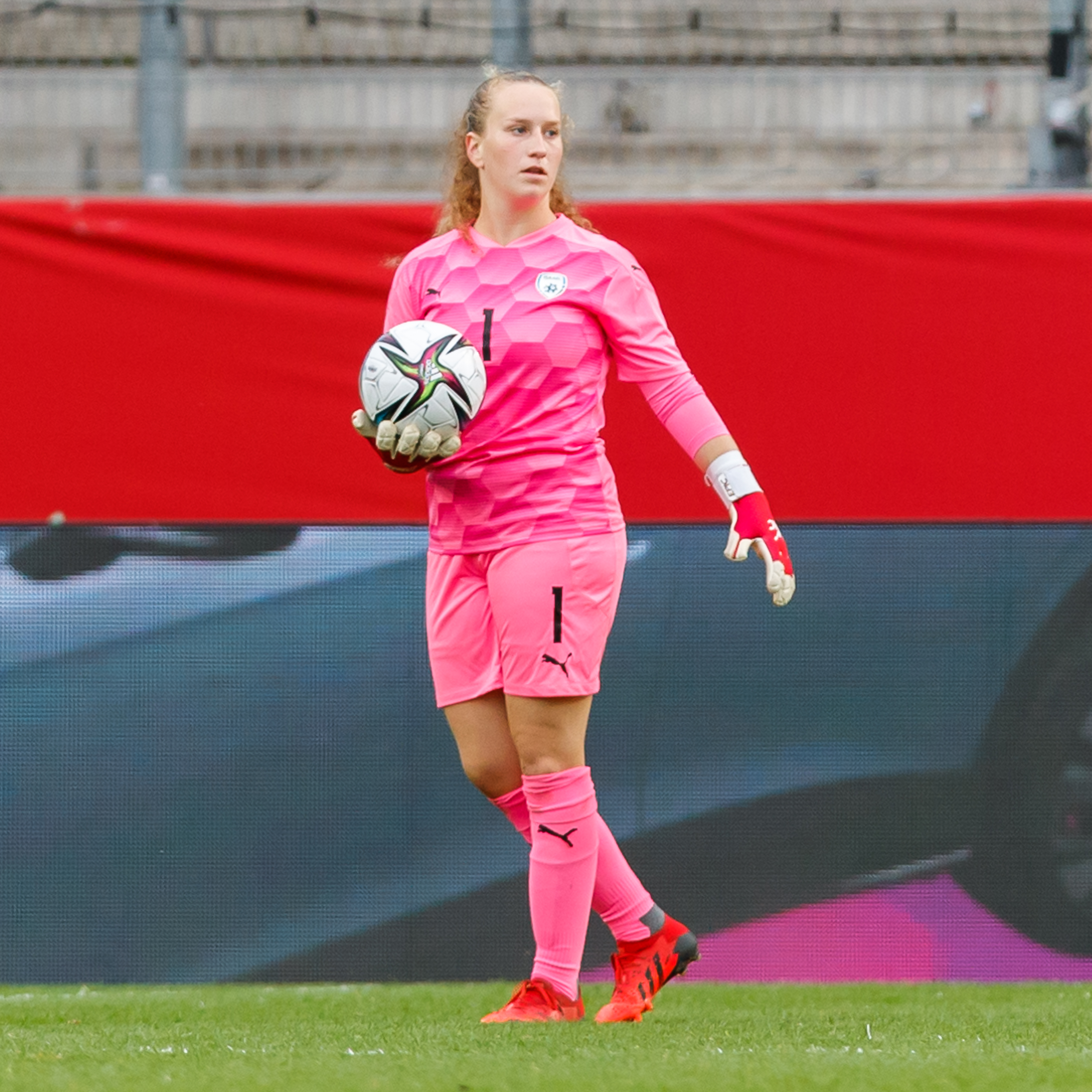

Personal information
- Date of birth: 20 August 2000 (age 26)
- Place of birth: Kiryat Gat, Israel
- Height: 1.65 m (5 ft 5 in)
- Position: Goalkeeper

Team information
- Current team: Kiryat Gat

Youth career
- 2012–2019: Kiryat Gat

College career
Years	Team	Apps	(Gls)
2021	Flagler Saints	4	(0)
2022–2024	St. Leo Lions	13	(0)

Senior career*
Years	Team	Apps	(Gls)
2015–2019	Youth Academy	55	(0)
2019–2021	Kiryat Gat	29	(0)
2025	Hapoel Be'er Sheva	12	(0)
2025–	Kiryat Gat	26	(0)

International career^{‡}
2021–	Israel	10	(0)
- * Club domestic league appearances and goals as of 27 September 2023 ‡ National team caps and goals as of 15 October 2026

Amit Beilin (Hebrew: עמית ביילין; born 20 August 2000) is an Israeli footballer who plays as a goalkeeper for Israeli team Kiryat Gat and the Israel women's national team.

== Early life ==
Beilin was raised in Kiryat Gat.

== College career ==
Beilin has attended Flagler College in the United States. Beilin transferred to St. Leo University for the 2022 season.

== International career ==
Beilin has been capped for the Israel national team, appearing for the team during the 2023 FIFA Women's World Cup qualifying cycle.
