= Timrat =

Community settlement in northern Israel

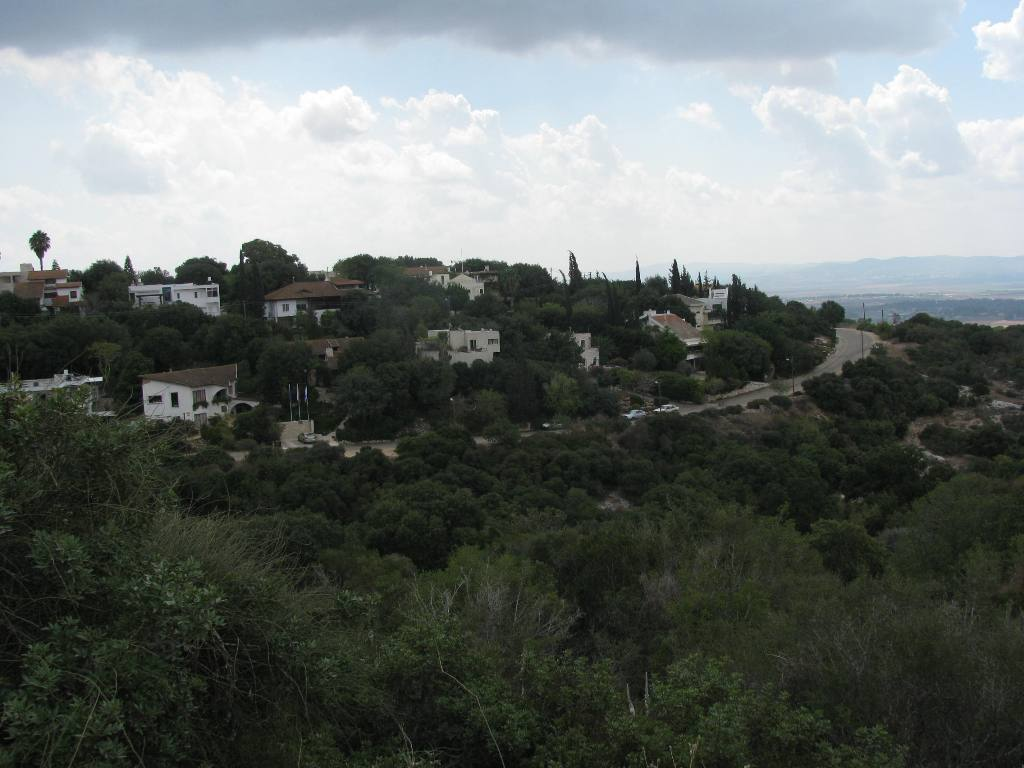

- Location within Jezreel Valley region of Israel Location within Israel
- Coordinates: 32°42′12″N 35°13′30″E
- Country: Israel
- District: Northern
- Subdistrict: Jezreel
- Council: Jezreel Valley
- Affiliation: HaMerkaz HaHakla'i
- Founded: 1981
- Founder: Bnei HaEmek Movement
- Population (2024): 1,443
- Website: www.timrat.org.il

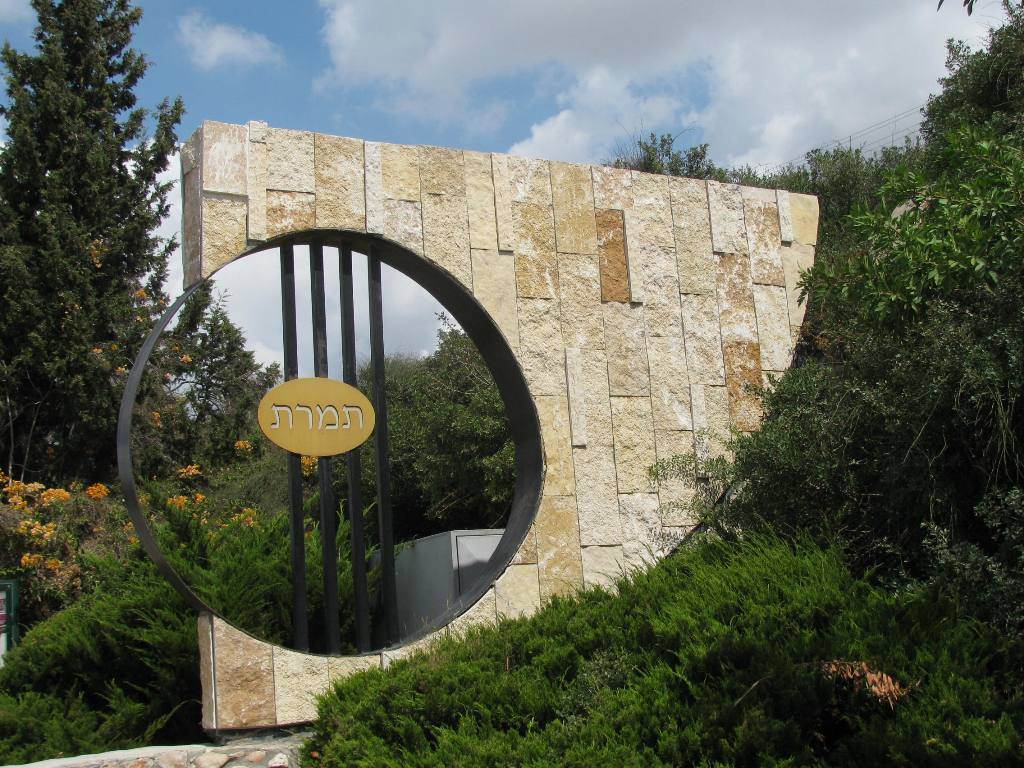
Moshav Timrat entrance

Timrat (Hebrew: תִּמְרַת, lit. 'Date') is a community settlement in northern Israel. Located in the Lower Galilee near Nahalal, it falls under the jurisdiction of Jezreel Valley Regional Council. In 2024 it had a population of 1,443.

== History ==
The village was established in 1981, though the site had previously been the location of kibbutz Timorim, which was established in 1948, but moved to the centre of the country in 1954 due to a shortage of land. Timorim had been established on land near the former depopulated Arab village of Ma'alul.

== Archaeology ==
The village is situated near the historic tell Shimron, which is the northernmost point of a natural winterthorn population. A Hebrew inscription with the word Shabbat (שַׁבָּת) was discovered west of Timrat by a casual hiker. This finding suggests a potential marking of the Sabbath boundary for a nearby town.

== Residents ==
Timrat has over 400 families and over 2,000 residents (home owners and renters). Most of them work outside of Timrat.

== Notable residents ==
- Shir Levo Football player
