= Alina Metkalov =

Israel footballer

Alina Metkalov אלינה מטקלוב
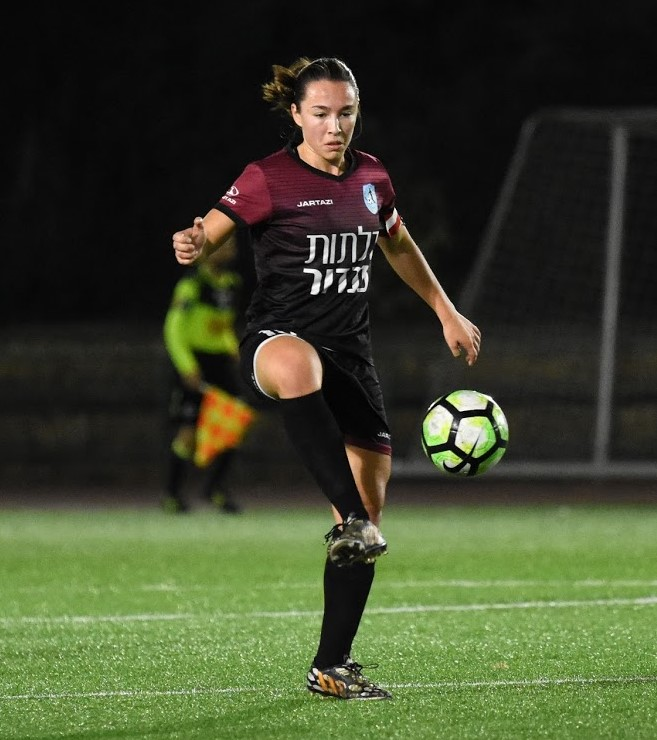

Personal information
- Date of birth: 17 March 1998 (age 28)
- Place of birth: Ukraine
- Position: Midfielder

International career^{‡}
Years	Team	Apps	(Gls)
2013–2014	Israel U17	11	(0)
2014–2016	Israel U19	17	(1)
2016–2018	Israel	15	(0)
- ‡ National team caps and goals as of 1 December 2021

Alina Metkalov (or Matkelov, Hebrew: אלינה מטקלוב; born 17 March 1998) is an Israeli footballer who plays as a midfielder and has appeared for the Israel women's national team.

== Career ==
Metkalov has been capped for the Israel national team, appearing for the team during the 2019 FIFA Women's World Cup qualifying cycle.
