= Anna Kozhnikova =

Russian footballer (born 1987)

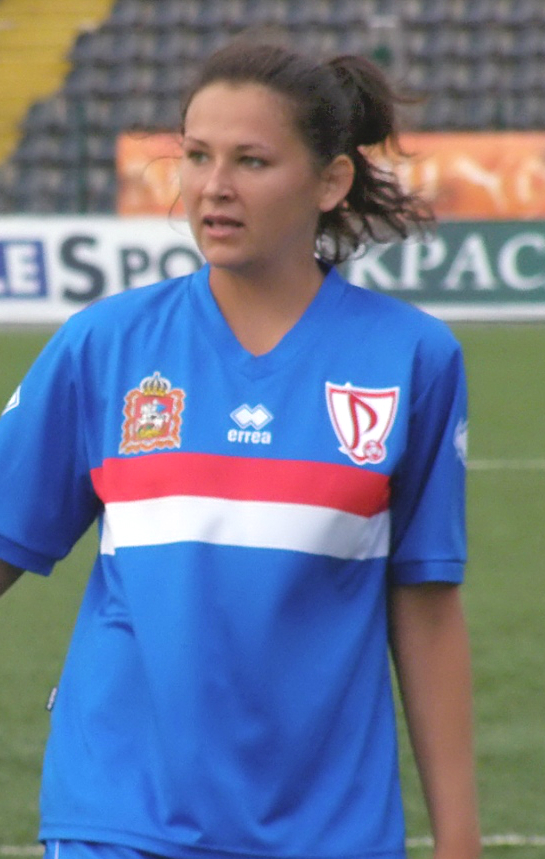

Personal information
- Full name: Anna Sergeyevna Kozhnikova
- Date of birth: 10 July 1987 (age 39)
- Place of birth: Rostov Oblast, Russian SFSR, Soviet Union
- Height: 1.76 m (5 ft 9 in)
- Position: Defender

Team information
- Current team: Lokomotiv Moscow
- Number: 3

Senior career*
Years	Team	Apps	(Gls)
2001–2004	Energiya Voronezh		
2005	Prialit Reutov		
2005–2016	WFC Rossiyanka	114	(10)
2017	CSKA Moscow	14	(2)
2018–	Lokomotiv Moscow	65	(15)

International career
2005–2006	Russia U19	16	(3)
2006–	Russia	84	(7)
- * Club domestic league appearances and goals

Anna Sergeyevna Kozhnikova (Russian: Анна Сергеевна Кожникова; born 10 July 1987) is a Russian football defender currently playing for Lokomotiv Moscow in the Russian Championship. She was the captain of the Russian national team.

== International goals ==
No.	Date	Venue	Opponent	Score	Result	Competition
1.	7 March 2009	GSP Stadium, Nicosia, Cyprus	New Zealand	3–1	4–2	2009 Cyprus Women's Cup
2.	17 November 2009	Ramat Gan Stadium, Ramat Gan, Israel	Israel	6–1	6–1	2011 FIFA Women's World Cup qualification
3.	6 June 2016	Gradski stadion, Koprivnica, Croatia	Croatia	3–0	3–0	UEFA Women's Euro 2017 qualifying
4.	4 September 2018	Sapsan Arena, Moscow, Russia	Bosnia and Herzegovina	3–0	3–0	2019 FIFA Women's World Cup qualification
5.	26 October 2021	Bosnia and Herzegovina FA Training Centre, Zenica, Bosnia & Herzegovina	Bosnia and Herzegovina	2–0	4–0	2023 FIFA Women's World Cup qualification
6.	26 October 2021	Bosnia and Herzegovina FA Training Centre, Zenica, Bosnia & Herzegovina	Bosnia and Herzegovina	4–0	4–0	2023 FIFA Women's World Cup qualification
7.	27 November 2025	Kim Il-sung Stadium, Pyongyang, North Korea	North Korea	2–2	2–5	Friendly
8.	7 June 2026	Wuhan Tazihu Football Training Center, Wuhan, China	China	1–0	1–0	Friendly

== Titles ==
- 2005 U-19 European Championship
- 3 Russian Leagues (2005, 2006, 2010)
- 5 Russian Cups (2005, 2006, 2008, 2009, 2010)
