= Gabriel Burstein =

Argentine–Israeli football player and manager

Personal information
- Full name: Gabriel Alejandro Burstein
- Date of birth: 4 October 1975 (age 51)
- Place of birth: Buenos Aires, Argentina

Team information
- Current team: Bnot Netanya

Youth career
- 1985–1991: River Plate

Senior career*
Years	Team	Apps	(Gls)
1991–1998	Maccabi Herzliya		

Managerial career
- 1999–2000: Maccabi Herzliya (assistant)
- 2000–2002: Gadna Tel Aviv Yehuda (assistant)
- 2002–2004: Hapoel Herzliya
- 2004–2005: Maccabi Netanya (assistant)
- 2005–2006: Hapoel Kfar Saba (assistant)
- 2006–2007: Club Comunicaciones
- 2007–2008: Hapoel Hod HaSharon
- 2008–2010: Maccabi Holon
- 2010–2012: Maccabi Jaffa
- 2012–2013: Club Comunicaciones
- 2013–2015: Maccabi Holon
- 2013–2014: Hapoel Ashkelon (assistant)
- 2015–2017: Hapoel Tel Aviv (assistant)
- 2017–2018: F.C. Ramat HaSharon
- 2019–2021: Israel U23
- 2019–2021: Israel (women)
- 2021–2022: Maccabi Kishronot Hadera
- 2022-2023: Israel U19
- 2022–2023: Hapoel Petah Tikva
- 2024-: Bnot Netanya
- * Club domestic league appearances and goals

Gabriel Alejandro Burstein (born 4 October 1975) is an Argentine football manager and former player who coaches Bnot Netanya.

== Playing career ==
Burstein began his football career in the River Plate club in his home country of Argentina, where he played until the age of sixteen. He then joined the Israeli football club Maccabi Herzliya as a professional player. He was forced by an injury to end his career at the age of twenty-three.

== Coaching career ==
In 2019, Burstein became the coach of the Israel women's national team. He was replaced by Gili Landau in July 2021. Following his stint with the national team, he was highly sought after by domestic clubs and was appointed as coach for Maccabi Kishronot Hadera.

== Personal life ==
Burstein's native language is Spanish, and he speaks English, Portuguese, and Hebrew fluently. He has some knowledge of French.

== Honors ==
- Best foreign coach of the Israeli championship 2010-2012 / 2019-2020 / 2020–2021
- Best Argentine coach abroad 2019-2020 / 2020-2021
