= Shir Levo =

Israeli association football player

Shir Levo שיר לבו
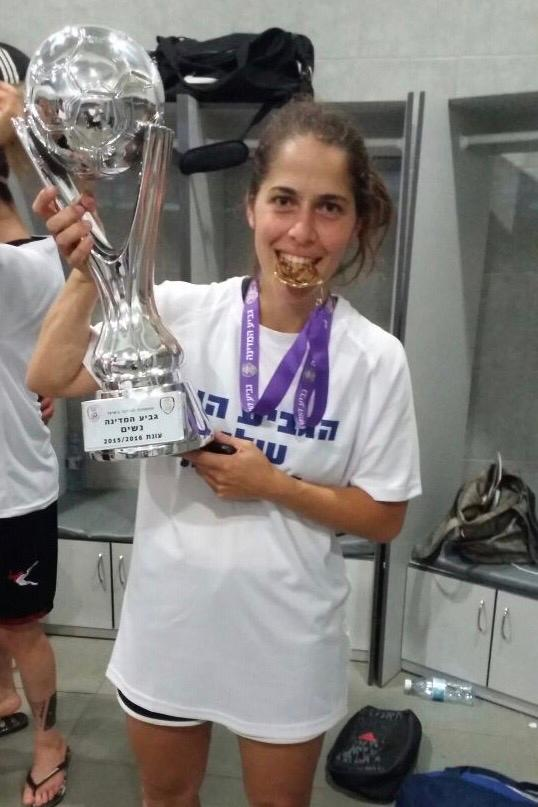

Personal information
- Full name: Shir Levo Shachaf
- Date of birth: 25 June 1998 (age 28)
- Place of birth: Timrat, Israel
- Position: Defender

College career
Years	Team	Apps	(Gls)
2009–2012	UT Southern FireHawks	38	(0)

Senior career*
Years	Team	Apps	(Gls)
2004–2007	Bnot Caesarea Tiv'on		
2007–2010	Maccabi Holon		
2012–2015	Maccabi Holon	34	(1)
2015–2016	Kiryat Gat	20	(1)

International career
2005–2006	Israel U19	7	(0)
2007–2016	Israel	7	(0)
- * Club domestic league appearances and goals

Shir Levo (Hebrew: שיר לבו; born 25 June 1988) is a former football player who played most of her career in Israel including seven caps for the Israel national football team.

== Personal life ==
Levo was born in Timrat in northern Israel. Her parents were both athletes, her father is a sprinter and mother was ranked third in Israel for the high jump. Her brother is the actor Liron Levo.

She married Hannoch Shahaf in 2016 and together they have two children.

== Career ==
=== Early career ===
She began playing for the Nahalal High School team where she played midfield.

Prior to her mandatory army service, Levo played for several seasons for Bnot Caesarea Tivon.

Following her service she played for several years for Maccabi Holon. During her time at Holon, Levo won the league three times and the State Cup four times. In her first three years with the club they failed to win only one of their matches.

=== College career ===
Levo moved to Martin Methodist College and played for the Redhawks for four years. In each year they won the TranSouth Athletic Conference championship.

Following the conclusion of her college career, Levo remained in the US to act as an assistant coach for the Cumberland Phoenix football team.

=== Return to Israel ===
Following her return to Israel Levo played two more seasons, one with Holon, and the other with Kiryat Gat. In her final season with Kiryat Gat she won the State Cup competition.

After retiring, Levo studied psychology and has become a sports psychologist.

=== National team ===
Levo played seven times for the Israeli national team.
