= Diana Redman =

Israeli footballer (born 1984)

Personal information
- Full name: Diana Redman
- Birth name: Diana Redman
- Date of birth: 2 July 1984 (age 42)
- Place of birth: Queens, New York, New York, U.S.
- Height: 1.83 m (6 ft 0 in)
- Position: Midfielder

Youth career
- 2004–2008: Queens College Knights

Senior career*
Years	Team	Apps	(Gls)
2005–2006	Long Island Rough Riders	15	(1)
2007–2012	Maccabi Holon	53	(6)
2013–2014	Pali Blues	6	(0)
2015	Santa Teresa	10	(0)

International career
2006–2020	Israel	50	(0)
- * Club domestic league appearances and goals

Diana Redman (Hebrew: דיאנה איריס בר-עוז; born 2 July 1984) is an American-Israeli footballer who played as a defensive midfielder. She played for Maccabi Holon in the Israeli Ligat Nashim, and for Santa Teresa in the Spanish Primera División. Internationally, she has represented Israel.

== Early life and education ==
Diana Redman (or Dayana Raidman/Radman, Hebrew: דיאנה איריס רדמן) was born in New York, to a Jewish family. She attended New Hyde Park Memorial High School in New York. She was offered a full athletic scholarship by Rider University; however, she transferred to Queens College after her freshman year. Intending only to stay at Queens a semester before transferring to a more prestigious institution, she changed her mind after joining the soccer program headed by former Israeli international Roby Young.

While playing for Queens College in New York she was a National Collegiate Athletic Association (NCAA) nominee for Woman of the Year, and received Queens College Knight Athlete of the Year.

Redman graduated from Queens College in May 2009 with a Masters of Fine Arts with a specialty in Poetry and Creative Writing, a BA in sociology with a concentration in social research and statistics, and a BA in English while receiving the Zolot Award for Literary Promise. She graduated from Tel Aviv University with her second master's degree concentrated in Trauma and Crisis, from the Bob Shapell School of Social Work. Before committing to a professional soccer career, she earned All American honors in the Heptathlon and ran track and field at Rider University.

== Playing career ==
=== Club ===
While still in college, Redman played for the Long Island Rough Riders in the American W-League.

In 2006, she moved to Israel and joined Maccabi Holon in the Israeli Women's First League. During her time with Maccabi Holon, she made six UEFA Women's Champions League appearances. Redman has been featured on Israel Sports Radio and Haaretz for both her academic and athletic achievements.

In 2013, Redman returned to the W-League, playing for the Pali Blues. In 2014, Redman trialed with Houston Dynamo, but was injured during the pre-season. In 2015, Redman signed with Spanish club Santa Teresa CD.

=== International ===
Redman made her debut for Israel in 2007 during a match against Cyprus in Cyprus.

== Life outside football ==
While playing in Israel, Redman balanced her professional soccer playing career while working as a social worker, developing sports education programs for young girls in Israel and around the world, and working as a freelance photographer.
