= Rony Schneider =

Israeli footballer

Personal information
- Full name: Ron Schneider
- Place of birth: Israel
- Position: Striker

College career
Years	Team	Apps	(Gls)
- Adelphi Panthers

Senior career*
Years	Team	Apps	(Gls)
1978	New York Arrows		
1979	Rochester Lancers	1	(0)

Managerial career
- 1997–2004: Israel (women)
- * Club domestic league appearances and goals

Ron "Rony" Schneider (Hebrew: רון "רוני" שניידר) is an Israeli former professional association footballer who played for the Rochester Lancers and was formerly the head coach of the Israel women's national football team. Today, he is a football commentator and has been credited as being a driving force in bringing women's association football to Israel.
