= Lee Falkon =

Israeli footballer (born 1992)

Lee Falkon לי פלקון
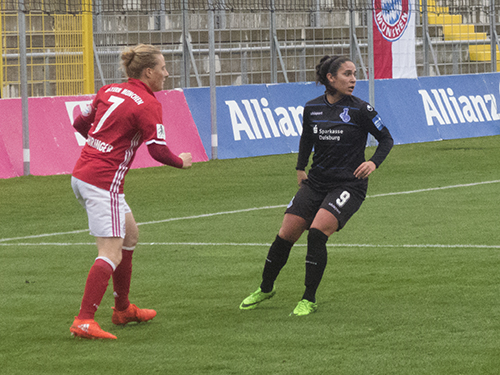
- Falkon (right) playing for MSV Duisburg in 2016

Personal information
- Full name: Lee Sima Falkon
- Date of birth: 7 May 1992 (age 34)
- Place of birth: Mishmar HaEmek, Israel
- Position: Forward

Team information
- Current team: Maccabi Emek Hefer
- Number: 10

Senior career*
Years	Team	Apps	(Gls)
2011–2013	ASA Tel Aviv University	35	(24)
2013–2014	SC Sand	23	(11)
2014–2015	Brøndby IF	23	(12)
2015–2017	MSV Duisburg	32	(14)
2017–2018	Western Sydney Wanderers	19	(9)
2018-2019	Ramat HaSharon		
2019–	Maccabi Emek Hefer		

International career^{‡}
2007	Israel U17	3	(1)
2008–2010	Israel U19	17	(4)
2009–	Israel	46	(7)
- * Club domestic league appearances and goals as of 20 February 2018 ‡ National team caps and goals as of 29 November 2021

Lee Sima Falkon (Hebrew: לי סימה פלקון; born 7 May 1992) is an Israeli footballer who plays as a forward for Maccabi Emek Hefer.

== Club career ==
=== ASA Tel Aviv University ===
After a few seasons training with Bnot Tiv'on Falkon started playing in the local senior league, where she joined ASA Tel Aviv University as she was attracted to their "eternal losers" tag. During her time at ASA Tel Aviv University, the club won 5 Ligat Nashim titles and 3 Israeli Women's Cup wins. At the age of 18, after receiving an "elite sportswoman" status from the army, Falkon decided to go to college in Kentucky to further her professional development, but returned to ASA Tel Aviv University when she discovered it wasn't what she expected.

=== SC Sand ===
After finishing her army service, Falkon was invited to join SC Sand in the 2. Frauen-Bundesliga. She arrived after recovering from a nine-month injury and had a hard time fitting in, so after a few months she returned to Israel.

=== Brøndby IF ===
After scoring a goal in Israel's away match against Denmark in the 2015 FIFA Women's World Cup qualification, Falkon received an offer to sign with local Danish club Brøndby IF. She had a great season with them including making the UEFA Women's Champions League quarter-finals, but left as she wasn't making enough money to function financially.

=== MSV Duisburg ===
In August 2015, Falkon joined recently relegated MSV Duisburg together with Israeli teammate Mairav Shamir on one-year contracts with an extension option. Falkon helped MSV Duisburg get promoted back to the Frauen-Bundesliga, and in April 2017 was the first Israeli footballer to be selected by Adidas to be sponsored.

=== Western Sydney Wanderers ===
Falkon joined Western Sydney Wanderers ahead of the 2017–18 season.

== International career ==
At the age of 13, Falkon joined Israel U19 team to give her a framework to play in, as there were no women's junior leagues functioning in Israel.

Falkon became a leading player in the senior side too, having over 30 international caps.

== Honours ==
ASA Tel Aviv University

- Ligat Nashim: 2011–12, 2012–13, 2013–14
- Israeli Women's Cup: 2011–12, 2013–14
