= Moran Lavi =

Israeli footballer

Moran Lavi מורן לביא
Personal information
- Full name: Moran Lavi
- Date of birth: February 3, 1983 (age 43)
- Place of birth: Kfar Saba, Israel
- Position: Midfielder

Team information
- Current team: ASA Tel Aviv University
- Number: 20

College career
Years	Team	Apps	(Gls)
2002–2005	TCU Horned Frogs	69	(4)

Senior career*
Years	Team	Apps	(Gls)
1998–2002	ASA Tel Aviv University		
2006	Haukar	4	(1)
2006–	ASA Tel Aviv University	150	(76)

International career^{‡}
2001	Israel U19	5	(2)
2000–2015	Israel	35	(2)
- * Club domestic league appearances and goals as of 10 September 2015 ‡ National team caps and goals as of 10 September 2015

Moran Lavi (Hebrew: מורן לביא; born 3 February 1983) is an Israeli football player who plays as a midfielder for ASA Tel Aviv University.

== International goals ==
No.	Date	Venue	Opponent	Score	Result	Competition
1.	12 October 2011	Ness Ziona Stadium, Ness Ziona, Israel	Scotland	1–2	1–6	UEFA Women's Euro 2013 qualifying
2.	7 May 2014	Ta' Qali National Stadium, Ta' Qali, Malta	Malta	2–0	2–0	2015 FIFA Women's World Cup qualification

== Honours ==
ASA Tel Aviv University

Winner

- Ligat Nashim (6): 1999–2000, 2009–10, 2010–11, 2011–12, 2012–13, 2013–14, 2014–15
- Israeli Women's Cup (3): 2010–11, 2011–12, 2013–14
