= Maya Barqui =

Israeli football defender

Maya Barqui מיה ברקי
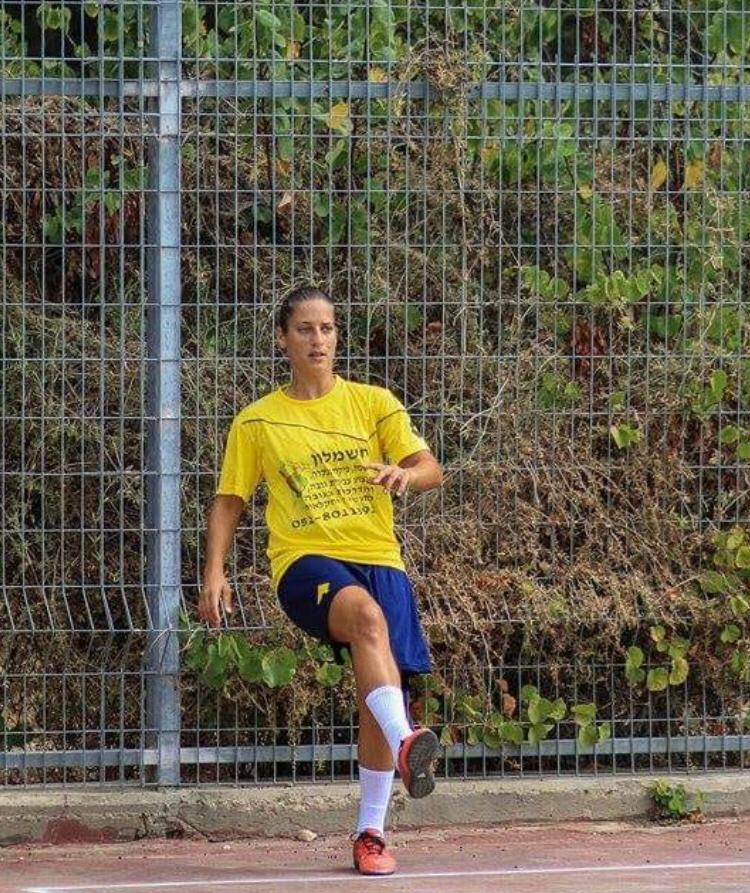
- Maya Barqui in 2017.

Personal information
- Full name: Maya Barqui
- Date of birth: 22 September 1985 (age 41)
- Place of birth: Israel
- Position: Defender

Team information
- Current team: Maccabi Kishronot Hadera
- Number: 16

Senior career*
Years	Team	Apps	(Gls)
?–2003	Maccabi Haifa		
2003–2008	Maccabi Holon		
2008–2011	Maccabi Kishronot Hadera	61	(7)
2011–2014	Maccabi Holon	56	(5)
2014–	Maccabi Kishronot Hadera	39	(0)

International career^{‡}
2001–2003	Israel U19	11	(1)
2002–2016	Israel	48	(0)
- * Club domestic league appearances and goals as of 19 June 2016 ‡ National team caps and goals as of 28 November 2021

Maya Barqui (or Berqui, Hebrew: מיה ברקי; born 22 September 1985) is an Israeli football defender. Barqui had played in the Israeli First League for Maccabi Haifa, Maccabi Holon and Maccabi Kishronot Hadera and played in the Champions League with both Maccabi Haifa and Maccabi Holon. and is a member of the Israeli national team, since making her debut in the 2003 World Cup qualifying against Wales. Barqui has so far played 45 matches for the national team, the most capped player.

== Honours ==
- Championships (5):
  - 2001–02 (with Maccabi Haifa), 2004–05, 2005–06, 2006–07, 2007–08 (with Maccabi Holon).
- Cup (9):
  - 2001–02 (with Maccabi Haifa), 2003–04, 2003–04, 2004–05, 2005–06, 2006–07, 2007–08, 2012–13 (with Maccabi Holon), 2014–15 (with Maccabi Kishronot Hadera).
