= Meirav Shamir =

Israeli-American footballer

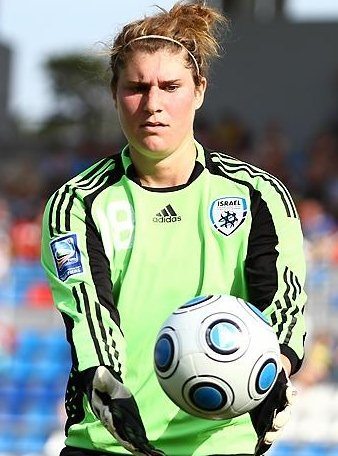
- Shamir with the Israel national team

Personal information
- Date of birth: 18 January 1988 (age 38)
- Place of birth: Netanya, Israel
- Height: 1.84 m (6 ft 0 in)
- Position: Goalkeeper

College career
Years	Team	Apps	(Gls)
2006–2009	Boston College Eagles		

Senior career*
Years	Team	Apps	(Gls)
2009–2012	ASA Tel Aviv		
2012–2014	Telstar	30	(0)
2014–2015	1. FC Lübars	20	(0)
2015–2016	MSV Duisburg	4	(0)

International career^{‡}
2009–2016	Israel	36	(0)
- * Club domestic league appearances and goals as of 8 September 2016 ‡ National team caps and goals as of 6 December 2021

Meirav Shamir (Hebrew: מירב שמיר; born 18 January 1988) is an Israeli-American footballer who plays as a goalkeeper. She has been a member of the Israel national team.

== Early life ==
Shamir was born in Netanya to a Jewish family. She grew up in the city of Netanya, until her family moved with her to the United States when she was two years old.

Shamir started playing soccer when she was just four years old and as a young child her dream was "to play soccer collegiately and eventually play for the national team."

== Club career ==
After competing with the United States side at the 2009 Maccabiah Games, Shamir was approached by the staff of the national team about joining them in their campaign to qualify for the 2011 FIFA Women's World Cup. Shamir subsequently left Boston College to join the national team and complete her degree at Tel Aviv University while playing for ASA Tel Aviv domestically. After 3 years in ASA Tel Aviv, taking three top league Championships and Israeli Cup, Shamir joined Telstar of the Eredivisie (First League) in the Netherlands. After a successful two seasons with Telstar, Shamir made the move to Germany and signed with the 2nd Bundesliga club, 1. FC Lübars, also known as the club Hertha BSC.

By FC Lübars, Shamir had a successful season. Her first 10 games, Shamir kept the 0, beating Manuel Neuer's record with most games without conceding a goal. She finished the season with 15 clean sheets in 20 games, and helping Lübars finish in first place and win the league. Unfortunately, due to financial problems, FC Lübars could not move up to the first league.

Shamir signed with MSV Duisburg for the 2015–16. MSV also competes in the 2nd Bundesliga after being relegated from the 1st Bundesliga after the 2014–15 season.

== International career ==
Shamir made her Israel national team debut in a 1–0 win on 24 October 2009 in a 2011 FIFA Women's World Cup qualifying match against Kazakhstan in Ness Ziona.
