= Shani David =

Israeli footballer (born 1991)

Shani David שני דוד
Personal information
- Date of birth: June 7, 1991 (age 35)
- Place of birth: Hadera, Israel
- Position: Defender

Team information
- Current team: Maccabi Kishronot Hadera
- Number: 8

Senior career*
Years	Team	Apps	(Gls)
2006–	Maccabi Kishronot Hadera	148	(24)

International career^{‡}
2007	Israel U17	3	(0)
2008–2009	Israel U19	12	(1)
2009–	Israel	55	(0)
Medal record
Representing Israel
Maccabiah Games
Gold medal – first place	2017 Israel	Women's soccer
- * Club domestic league appearances and goals as of 1 August 2015 ‡ National team caps and goals as of 15 October 2026

Shani David (Hebrew: שני דוד; born June 7, 1991) is an Israeli footballer who plays as a defender for Maccabi Kishronot Hadera. She is a member of the Israeli national team, having played her debut for the national team against Belarus. David also coaches at women's youth levels.

At the 2017 Maccabiah Games, David scored a goal in the final for Israel as it beat Team USA 2–1 to win a gold medal in women's soccer.

== Honours ==
- Cup (1):
  - 2014–15
