= Danielle Paz =

Israeli footballer

Danielle Leige Paz דניאל לי פז
Personal information
- Date of birth: 18 May 1994 (age 32)
- Place of birth: Israel
- Position: Forward

Senior career*
Years	Team	Apps	(Gls)
2012–2018	ASA Tel Aviv University	113	(20)

International career^{‡}
2016–2017	Israel	2	(0)
- * Club domestic league appearances and goals as of 30 August 2019 ‡ National team caps and goals as of 30 August 2019

Danielle Leige Paz (Hebrew: דניאל לי פז; born 18 May 1994) is an Israeli footballer who plays as a forward and has appeared for the Israel women's national team.

== Career ==
Paz has been capped for the Israel national team, appearing for the team during the 2019 FIFA Women's World Cup qualifying cycle.
