= Daniel Sofer =

Israeli footballer

Daniel Sofer דניאל סופר
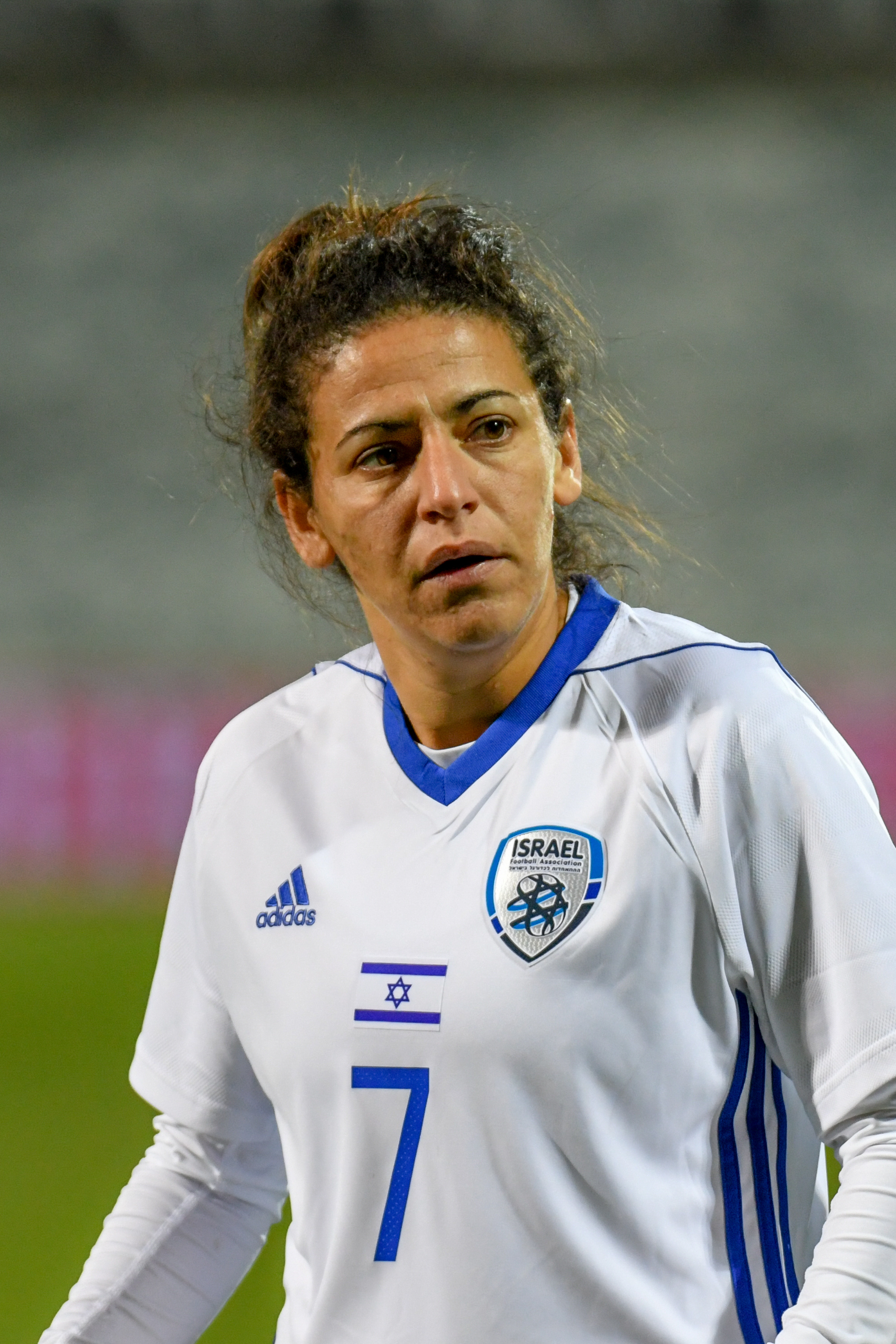

Personal information
- Full name: Daniel Sofer
- Date of birth: January 14, 1988 (age 38)
- Place of birth: Israel
- Position: Defender

Team information
- Current team: Maccabi Kishronot Hadera

Senior career*
Years	Team	Apps	(Gls)
2004–	Maccabi Kishronot Hadera		

International career^{‡}
2004–2006	Israel U19	12	(2)
2005–2019	Israel	42	(5)
- * Club domestic league appearances and goals as of 3 April 2015 ‡ National team caps and goals as of 6 December 2021

Daniel Sofer (Hebrew: דניאל סופר; born 14 January 1988) is an Israeli football player who plays as a defender.
