= Noa Selimhodžić =

Israeli footballer (born 2003)

Noa Selimhodžić נועה סלימהוג'יץ
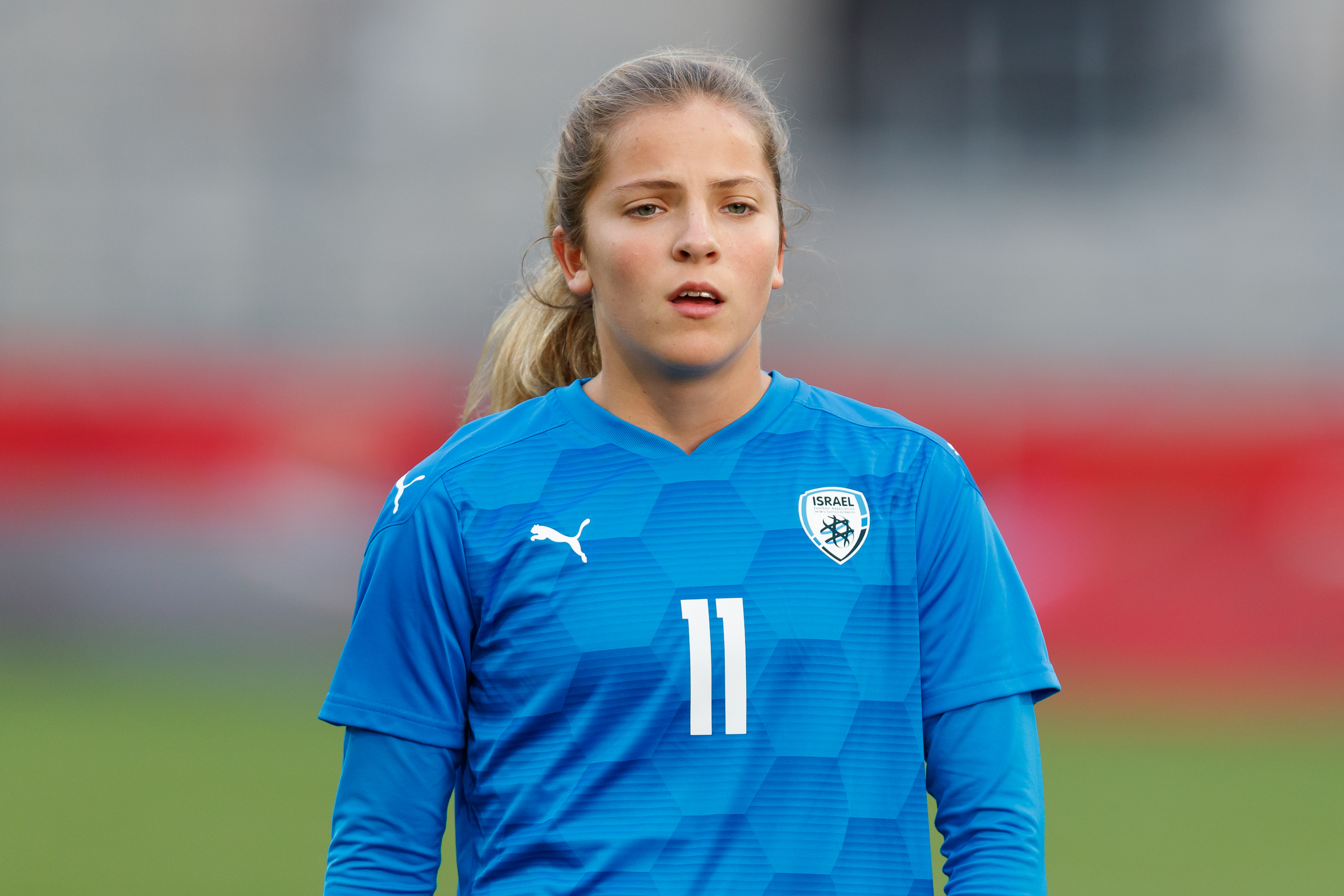
- Selimhodzic playing for Israel in 2021

Personal information
- Date of birth: 15 October 2003 (age 23)
- Place of birth: Israel
- Position: Midfielder

Team information
- Current team: F.C. Kiryat Gat
- Number: 10

Youth career
- 2011–2016: Maccabi Netanya
- 2014–2020: Maccabi Emek Hefer

Senior career*
| Years | Team | Apps | (Gls) |
| 2016–2019 | Youth Academy | 57 | (20) |
| 2019–2021 | Maccabi Emek Hefer | 30 | (14) |
| 2021–2022 | AC Milan | 6 | (0) |
| 2022–2025 | Turbine Potsdam | 32 | (1) |
| 2025–2026 | Kiryat Gat | 26 | (20) |
| 2026– | Rio Ave | 6 | (0) |

International career^{‡}
| 2020– | Israel | 40 | (9) |
- * Club domestic league appearances and goals as of 9 November 2026 ‡ National team caps and goals as of 11 October 2026

Noa Selimhodžić (Hebrew: נועה סלימהוג'יץ; born 15 October 2003) is an Israeli footballer who plays as a midfielder for Campeonato Nacional Feminino (Liga BPI) club Rio Ave and the Israel national team.

She also holds Bosnian citizenship.

== Early life ==
Selimhodžić's parents, Aleksandra and Damir, are refugees from Bosnia (then part of former Yugoslavia) who fled the Bosnian War and arrived in Israel, where Noa was born and raised. They reside in Netanya. Her older brother is Israeli footballer Adi Selimhodžić.

She attended the Ruppin High School.

== Club career ==
Selimhodžić started to play in Israeli club Maccabi Netanya's boys team at the age of 8. She has played for Youth Academy and Maccabi Emek Hefer in Israel.

=== AC Milan ===
In October 2021, Selimhodžić joined Italian club AC Milan, signing a three-year contract. She became the first Israeli, male or female, to ever play for the club. In November, she made her debut, coming on as a substitute in the 81st minute of a 1–0 victory over Empoli.

=== Turbine Potsdam ===
In July 2022 Selimhodžić joined German club Turbine Potsdam.

== International career ==
Selimhodžić has been capped for the Israel national team, appearing for the senior squad during the 2023 FIFA Women's World Cup qualifiers. She scored her debut goal for the senior team in February 2022, in a 2–2 friendly match against Greece.

== Career statistics ==
| No. | Date | Venue | Opponent | Score | Result | Competition |
|---|---|---|---|---|---|---|
| 1. | 21 February 2022 | Pampeloponnisiako Stadium, Patras, Greece | Greece | 1–1 | 2–2 | Friendly |
| 2. | 23 June 2022 | Stadion Lokomotiv, Plovdiv, Bulgaria | Bulgaria | 1–0 | 2–0 | 2023 FIFA Women's World Cup qualification |
| 3. | 26 September 2023 | Tamme Stadium, Tartu, Estonia | Estonia | 3–0 | 5–0 | 2023–24 UEFA Women's Nations League |
| 4. | 2 December 2023 | Republican Stadium, Yerevan, Armenia | Armenia | 6–1 | 6–1 | 2023–24 UEFA Women's Nations League |
| 5. | 16 July 2024 | Budaörsi Városi Stadium, Budaörs, Hungary | Slovakia | 1–1 | 2–2 | UEFA Women's Euro 2025 qualifying |
| 6. | 25 February 2025 | Alcufer Stadion, Győr, Hungary | Estonia | 1–0 | 3–1 | 2025 UEFA Women's Nations League |
| 7. | 30 May 2025 | Kadriorg Stadium, Tallinn, Estonia | Estonia | 1–0 | 3–0 | 2025 UEFA Women's Nations League |
| 8. | 14 April 2026 | BSC Stadium, Budaörs, Hungary | Luxembourg | 2–0 | 6–0 | 2027 FIFA Women's World Cup qualification |
| 9. | 18 April 2026 | BSC Stadium, Budaörs, Hungary | Luxembourg | 3–1 | 3–1 | 2027 FIFA Women's World Cup qualification |
