= Caroline Abbé =

Swiss footballer (born 1988)

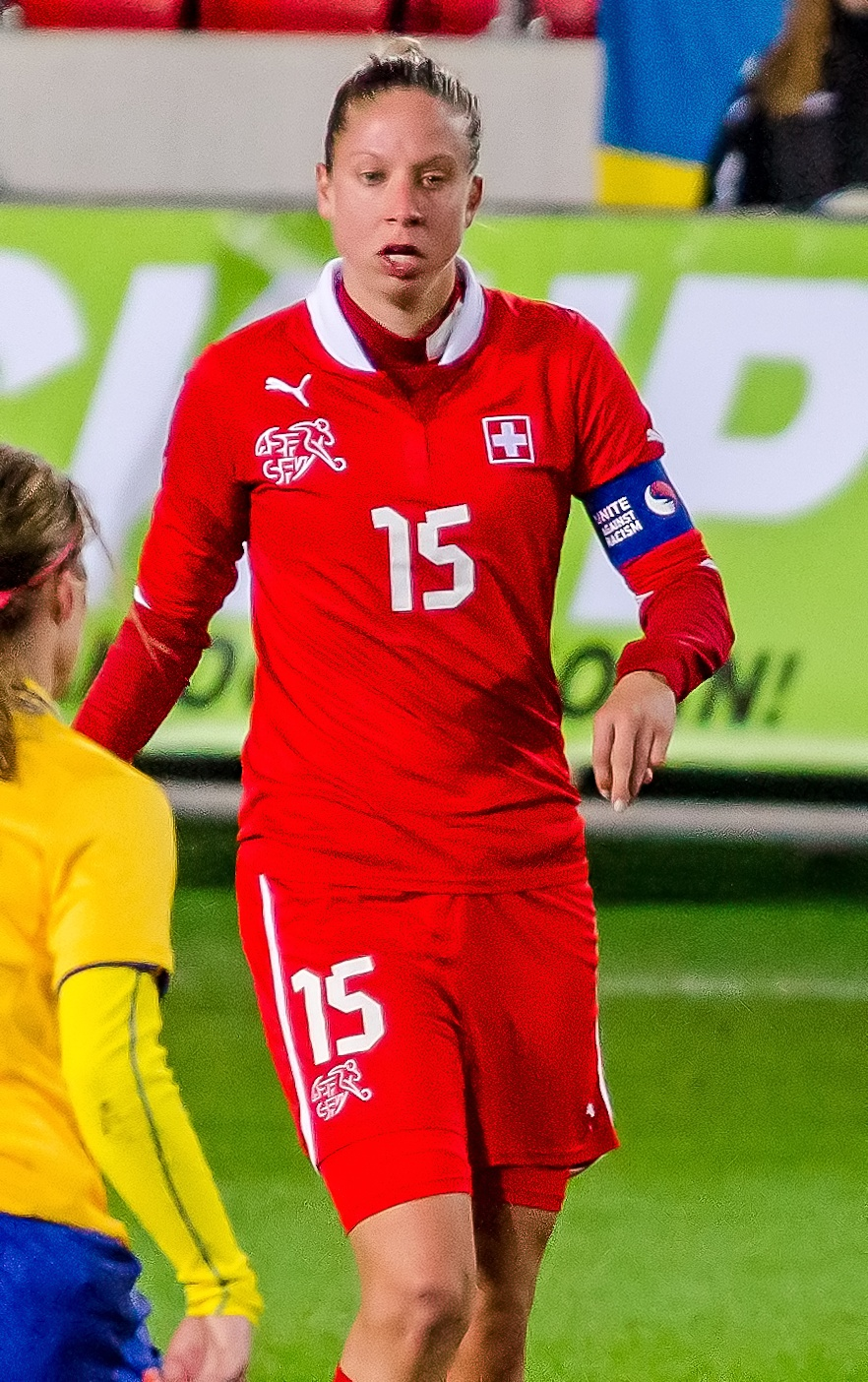
- Abbé capatining Switzerland in 2012.

Personal information
- Full name: Caroline Agnès Abbé
- Date of birth: 13 January 1988 (age 38)
- Place of birth: Geneva, Switzerland
- Height: 1.79 m (5 ft 10 1/2 in)
- Position: Defender

Youth career
- 1993–2003: FC Meyrin
- 2003–2006: CS Chênois

Senior career*
Years	Team	Apps	(Gls)
2006–2011	Yverdon		
2011–2014	Freiburg	59	(4)
2014–2017	Bayern Munich	55	(8)
2016	Bayern Munich II	3	(2)
2017–2019	FC Zürich	8	(1)
2019–2021	Servette	41	(4)

International career^{‡}
2005–2006	Switzerland U-19		
2006–2017	Switzerland	127	(10)
- * Club domestic league appearances and goals as of 10 January 2018 ‡ National team caps and goals as of 10 January 2018 (UTC)

Caroline Agnès Abbé (born 13 January 1988) is a Swiss former footballer who played as a defender and for the Switzerland national team as their captain.

== Career ==
Abbé is a former player of FC Yverdon, with whom she won two National Cups. In the 2011–12 Bundesliga summer transfer market, she signed for newly promoted SC Freiburg.

In 2014, she signed for Bayern Munich to play there until 2017. In June 2017, she returned to Switzerland to play for FC Zürich.

== Honours ==
Yverdon Féminin

- Swiss Women's Cup (2): 2010, 2011

Bayern München

- Bundesliga (2): 2014–15, 2015–16
