= Danique Stein =

Swiss footballer (born 1990)

Personal information
- Full name: Danique Stein
- Date of birth: 16 July 1990 (age 36)
- Place of birth: Basel, Switzerland
- Height: 1.78 m (5 ft 10 in)
- Positions: Defender; midfielder

Youth career
- 2000–2002: FC Birsfelden
- 2002–2004: FC Pratteln

Senior career*
Years	Team	Apps	(Gls)
2004–2009	Concordia Basel		
2009–2010	Freiburg	15	(1)
2010–2011	Bad Neuenahr	4	(0)
2011–2017	Basel	131	(17)

International career^{‡}
2007–2009	Switzerland U19	13	(4)
2010	Switzerland U20	2	(0)
2009–2014	Switzerland	22	(1)

Managerial career
- 2019–2021: Basel (U19 coach)
- 2021–2022: Basel
- * Club domestic league appearances and goals as of 31 July 2023 ‡ National team caps and goals as of 31 July 2023

Danique Stein (born 16 July 1990) is a former Swiss football defender, who last played for Basel in the Nationalliga A. She has also played for Concordia Basel (Nat. A), SC Freiburg and SC 07 Bad Neuenahr (Bundesliga).

She has been a member of the Swiss national team. As an Under-19 international she took part in the 2009 U-19 European Championship.

Since her retirement from active football she works for the foundation of the Youth Campus Basel and is in the business management, she is head of finances and responsible for the sectors administration and events.
