= Valentina Savchenkova =

Russian footballer (born 1983)

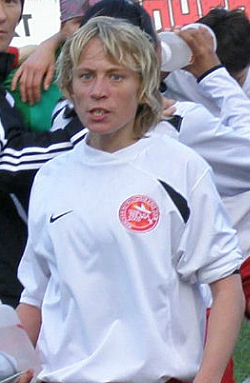
- With Zvezda Perm in 2010

Personal information
- Full name: Valentina Aleksandrovna Savchenkova
- Date of birth: 29 April 1983 (age 43)
- Place of birth: Omsk, Soviet Union
- Height: 1.63 m (5 ft 4 in)
- Position: Defender

Senior career*
| Years | Team | Apps | (Gls) |
| 2000–2001 | Kubanochka | | |
| 2002–2003 | Energetik Kislovodsk | | |
| 2004–2005 | Lada Togliatti | | |
| 2006 | Nadezhda Noginsk | | |
| 2007–2012 | Zvezda Perm | | |
| 2012–2016 | Ryazan-VDV | 48 | (0) |

International career^{‡}
| 2004–2014 | Russia | 51 | (7) |
- * Club domestic league appearances and goals as of 11 April 2014 ‡ National team caps and goals as of 13:43, 19 July 2013 (UTC)

Valentina Alexandrovna Savchenkova is a former Russian football defender who played for Ryazan-VDV. She has won five Russian leagues with Lada Togliatti, Zvezda Perm and VDV Ryazan.

She is a member of the Russian national team.

== Official international goals ==
- 2007 World Cup qualification
  - 1 in Russia 6–0 Scotland
  - 1 in Scotland 0–4 Russia
- 2009 European Championship qualification
  - 1 in Poland 1–4 Russia
- 2011 World Cup qualification
  - 1 in Russia 3–0 Ireland
  - 1 in Israel 1–6 Russia
  - 1 in Kazakhstan 0–6 Russia
