= Tal Isaev =

Israeli footballer (born 1993)

Tal Isaev טל איסייב
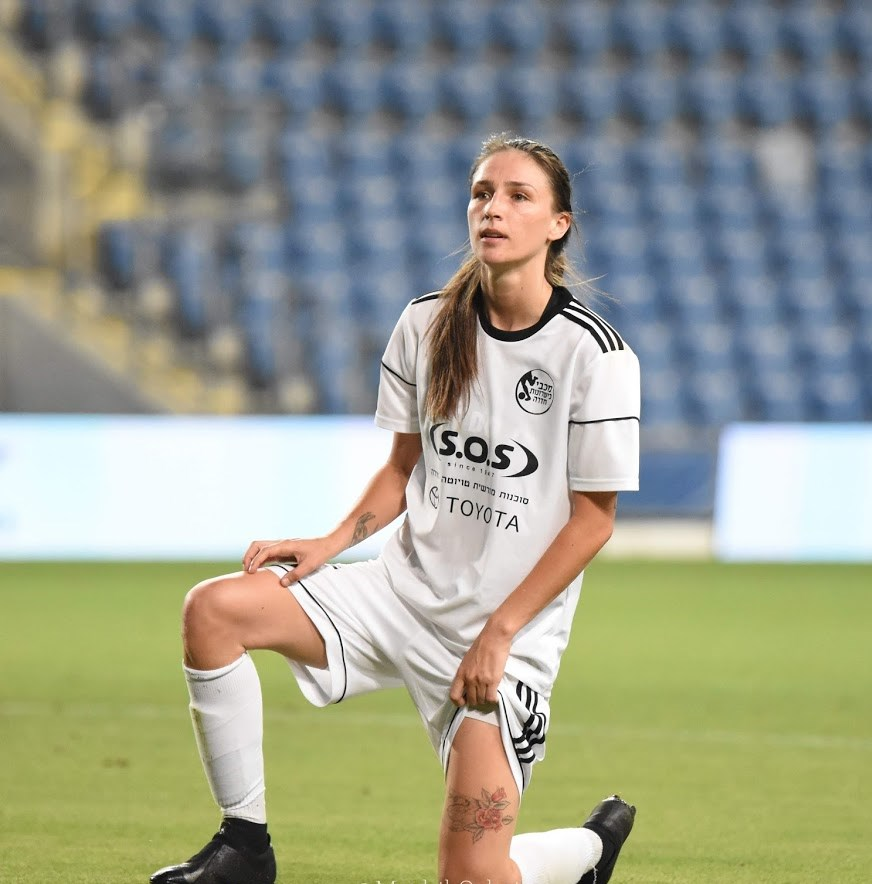
- Isaev with Maccabi Kishronot Hadera in 2020

Personal information
- Date of birth: 20 December 1993 (age 32)
- Place of birth: Nof HaGalil, Israel
- Height: 1.73 m (5 ft 8 in)
- Position: Full back

Team information
- Current team: Maccabi Emek Hefer

Senior career*
Years	Team	Apps	(Gls)
2008–2010	Bnot Caesarea Tiv'on	11+	(5)
2010–2020	Maccabi Kishronot Hadera	188	(31)
2020–2021	Hapoel Petah Tikva	16	(0)
2021–	Maccabi Emek Hefer	35	(1)

International career
2014	Israel	4	(0)
- * Club domestic league appearances and goals as of 13 February 2024

Tal Isaev (Hebrew: טל איסייב; born 20 December 1993) is an Israeli former footballer who played as a leftback. She spent her entire club career in her country, which she represented internationally.
