= Rachel Shelina Israel =

Brazilian-born Israeli football defender (born 1986)

Shelly Israel שלי ישראל
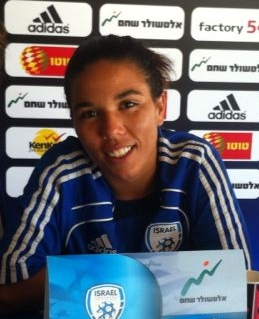

Personal information
- Full name: Rachel Shelina Israel
- Date of birth: 18 January 1986 (age 40)
- Place of birth: Brazil
- Position: Defender

Team information
- Current team: ASA Tel Aviv University
- Number: 18

Senior career*
Years	Team	Apps	(Gls)
1999–2000	Maccabi Netanya		
2000–	ASA Tel Aviv University		

International career^{‡}
2001–2005	Israel U19	15	(2)
2005–2016	Israel	39	(5)
- * Club domestic league appearances and goals ‡ National team caps and goals as of 29 November 20201

Rachel Shelly Israel (or Sheli/Shelina, Hebrew: רחל שלי ישראל; born 18 January 1986) is a Brazilian-born Israeli football defender currently playing for Israeli First League for ASA Tel Aviv University, with which she has also played in the Champions League. She is a member of the Israeli national team, where she made her debut in the 2007 World Cup qualifying against Estonia.

== Club career ==
Israel was born in Brazil and was adopted by an Israeli couple at an early age. She grew up in Netanya and played for Maccabi Netanya until the club had folded and Israel moved to play for ASA Tel Aviv University, where she played ever since. Israel won 5 championships and 3 cups with ASA Tel Aviv, and represented the club in the Champions League in each edition since 2010–11, scoring four goals for the club.

== Management career ==
In 2011 Israel started coaching a football team, Bnot Caesarea, which she also partly owned. In 2013, following a dispute with the team's co-owner, Ran Ben Basat, Israel quit the club and started Bnot Netanya. Since 2013 Israel also serves as coach of ASA Tel Aviv University U-16 team.

== International career ==
Israel made her international debut for Israel women's national football team in 2005 against Estonia and so far had played a total of 32 matches for the national team, scoring four goals. Israel also played for the U-19 national team, making a total of 14 appearances and scoring two goals, between 2001 and 2004.

== Honours ==
- Championships (5):
  - 2009–10, 2010–11, 2011–12, 2012–13, 2012–13
- Cup (3):
  - 2010–11, 2011–12, 2013–14
