= Moran Fridman =

Israeli footballer (born 1990)

Moran Fridman מורן פרידמן
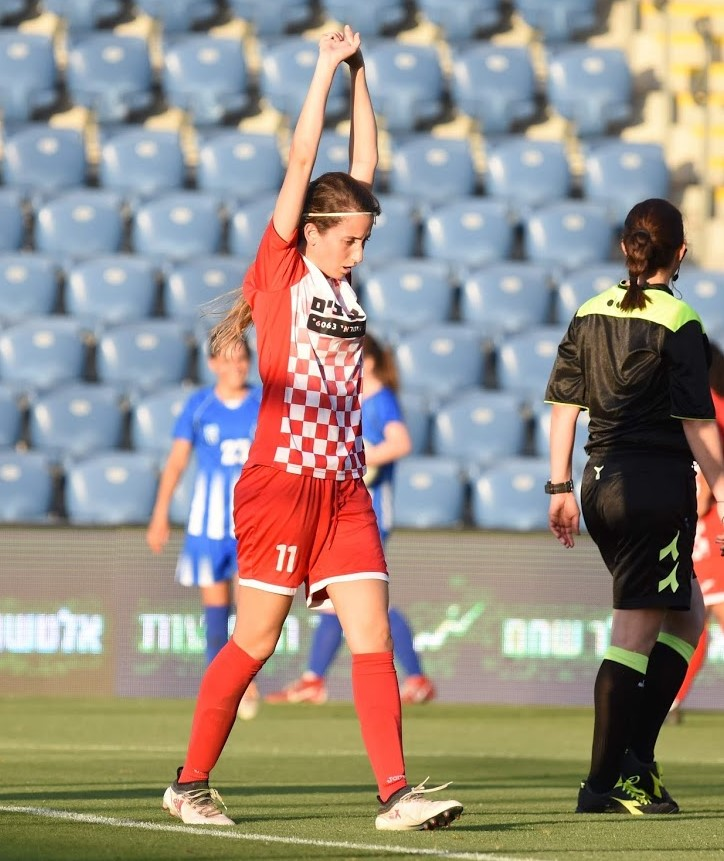
- 2019

Personal information
- Full name: Moran Fridman
- Date of birth: January 3, 1990 (age 36)
- Place of birth: Bnei Atarot, Israel
- Position: Midfielder

Team information
- Current team: ASA Tel Aviv University
- Number: 11

Youth career
- Hapoel Kiryat Ono

Senior career*
| Years | Team | Apps | (Gls) |
| 2005–2006 | Hakoah Amidar Ramat Gan | | |
| 2006– | ASA Tel Aviv University | 168 | (60) |

International career^{‡}
| 2009– | Israel | 38 | (2) |
- * Club domestic league appearances and goals as of 10 September 2015 ‡ National team caps and goals as of 8 September 2016

Moran Fridman (Hebrew: מורן פרידמן; born 3 January 1990) is an Israeli football player who plays as a midfielder for ASA Tel Aviv University.

== Honours ==
ASA Tel Aviv University

Winner

- Ligat Nashim (5): 2010–11, 2011–12, 2012–13, 2013–14, 2014–15
- Israeli Women's Cup (3): 2010–11, 2011–12, 2013–14

== Matches of M. Fridman ==
| 19/09/16 | UWC | Norway | 5 - 0 | Israel |
|---|---|---|---|---|
| 15/09/16 | UWC | Wales | 3 - 0 | Israel |
| 06/06/16 | UWC | Austria | 4 - 0 | Israel |
| 02/06/16 | UWC | Kazakhstan | 1 - 0 | Israel |
| 06/04/16 | UWC | Israel | 0 - 1 | Norway |
| 01/12/15 | UWC | Israel | 2 - 2 | Wales |
| 25/10/15 | UWC | Israel | 0 - 1 | Austria |
| 22/10/15 | WWQ | Israel | 0 - 0 | Kazakhstan |
| 17/09/14 | WWQ | Denmark | 0 - 1 | Israel |
| 13/09/14 | WWQ | Iceland | 3 - 0 | Israel |
