= Luxembourg women's national football team results (2020–present) =

- Win Draw Loss

This is a list of the Luxembourg women's national football team results from 2020 to present.

== 2020s ==
=== 2020 ===
| 20 September 2020 Friendly | Luxembourg | 0–3 | Bulgaria | Beggen, Luxembourg |
| | | Fussball-Lux | ?; ?; ? | Stadium: Stade rue Henri Dunant; Attendance: 0 (due to COVID-19); Referee: Maïka Vanderstichel (France) |

=== 2021 ===
| 11 April 2021 Friendly | Liechtenstein | 1–2 | Luxembourg | Eschen, Liechtenstein |
| 16:00 | Gerner 35' | LFV; Fussball-Lux | Estévez García 46'; Marques Abreu 59' | Stadium: Sportpark Eschen-Mauren; Attendance: 0 (due to COVID-19); Referee: Simona Ghisletta (Switzerland) |

| 12 June 2021 Friendly | Luxembourg | 0–1 | Belgium | Weidingen, Luxembourg |
| 18:00 | | ESPN; Fussball-Lux | Blom 9' | Stadium: Stade Am Pëtz; Attendance: 500; Referee: Victoria Beyer (France) |

| 17 September 2021 2023 World Cup Qualification | Northern Ireland | 4–0 | Luxembourg | Larne, Northern Ireland |
| 20:00 (19:00 BST) | Callaghan 16'; Furness 23'; Wilson 41'; Wade 70' | Report (FIFA); Report (UEFA) | | Stadium: Inver Park; Attendance: 1,435; Referee: Eleni Antoniou (Greece) |

| 21 September 2021 2023 World Cup Qualification | Luxembourg | 0–10 | England | Luxembourg City, Luxembourg |
| 20:15 | | Report (FIFA); Report (UEFA) | White 12', 17'; Parris 27'; Greenwood 37', 47'; Berscheid 62' (o.g.); Bright 79', 90+1'; Daly 90+3'; England 90+4' | Stadium: Stade de Luxembourg; Attendance: 1,262; Referee: Aleksandra Česen (Slovenia) |

| 22 October 2021 2023 World Cup Qualification | Austria | 5–0 | Luxembourg | Wiener Neustadt, Austria |
| 18:00 | Billa 42', 50'; Naschenweng 45+2'; Enzinger 66'; Puntigam 84' (pen.) | Report (FIFA); Report (UEFA) | | Stadium: Stadion Wiener Neustadt; Attendance: 709; Referee: Zoe Stavrou (Cyprus) |

| 26 October 2021 2023 World Cup Qualification | North Macedonia | 2–3 | Luxembourg | Ohrid, North Macedonia |
| 13:30 | Rochi 21'; Nikolovska 90' | Report (FIFA); Report (UEFA) | Marques Abreu 8', 62'; Thill 67' | Stadium: SRC Biljanini Izvori; Attendance: 145; Referee: Nadezhda Gorinova (Russia) |

| 30 November 2021 2023 World Cup Qualification | Luxembourg | 0–8 | Austria | Luxembourg City, Luxembourg |
| 20:00 | | Report (FIFA); Report (UEFA) | Enzinger 16', 17', 23'; Billa 27', 62'; Dunst 48'; Höbinger 60'; Zadrazil 68' | Stadium: Stade de Luxembourg; Attendance: 719; Referee: Andromachi Tsiofliki (Greece) |

=== 2022 ===
| 16 February 2022 Friendly | Luxembourg | 5–0 | Tahiti | Mamer, Luxembourg |
| 17:00 | Estévez García 40'; MIller 42'; Marques Abreu 61'; Lourenco Magalhães 75'; Thompson 82' | Fussball-Lux | | Stadium: Stade François Trausch; Attendance: 120; Referee: Karoline Wacker (Germany) |

| 19 February 2022 Friendly | Tahiti | 0–11 | Luxembourg | Molsheim, France |
| 19:00 | | Fussball-Lux | Lourenco Magalhães 14', 39', 60', 60'; Thompson 35', 41'; Marques Abreu 45+2', 70'; Ludwig 46'; Dos Santos 57'; De Lemos 77' (pen.) | Stadium: Stade Molsheim |

| 9 April 2022 2023 World Cup Qualification | Luxembourg | 3–2 | Latvia | Bettembourg, Luxembourg |
| 11:00 | Lourenco Magalhães 50'; Thompson 81', 90+5' | Report (FIFA); Report (UEFA) | Fedotova 29', 47' | Stadium: Stade Municipal; Attendance: 375; Referee: Franziska Wildfeuer (Germany) |

| 12 April 2022 2023 World Cup Qualification | Luxembourg | 2–1 | North Macedonia | Esch-sur-Alzette, Luxembourg |
| 18:00 | Thompson 28', 45+1' | Report (FIFA); Report (UEFA) | Rochi 1' | Stadium: Stade Émile Mayrisch; Attendance: 554; Referee: Deborah Anex (Switzerland) |

| 19 June 2022 Friendly | Luxembourg | 2–1 | Cape Verde | Bettembourg, Luxembourg |
| 19:15 | Dos Santos 8'; Jorge 15' | Fussball-Lux; FLF on Instagram | Pereira 7' | Stadium: Stade Municipal; Attendance: 880; Referee: Viki de Cremer (Belgium) |

| 24 June 2022 2023 World Cup Qualification | Latvia | 1–0 | Luxembourg | Riga, Latvia |
| 16:00 (17:00 EEST) | Treimane 64' | Report (FIFA); Report (UEFA) | | Stadium: Daugava Stadium; Attendance: 386; Referee: Kateryna Usova (Ukraine) |

| 28 June 2022 Friendly | Belgium | 6–1 | Luxembourg | Lier, Belgium |
| 20:00 | Vanmechelen 15', 44', 48'; Tysiak 45+4', 73'; Blom 81' | ESPN; Fussball-Lux | Jorge 34' | Stadium: Stade Herman-Vanderpoorten; Attendance: 3,000; Referee: Helen Byrne (England) |

| 2 September 2022 2023 World Cup Qualification | Luxembourg | 1–2 | Northern Ireland | Esch-sur-Alzette, Luxembourg |
| 18:30 | Thompson 80' | Report (FIFA); Report (UEFA) | Robson 52'; McKenna 85' | Stadium: Stade Émile Mayrisch; Attendance: 342; Referee: Jelena Pejković (Croatia) |

| 6 September 2022 2023 World Cup Qualification | England | 10–0 | Luxembourg | Stoke-on-Trent, England |
| 20:30 (19:30 BST) | Stanway 12' (pen.), 26'; Russo 18'; Daly 38'; Mead 40'; England 48', 90+2'; Parris 59'; Toone 73' (pen.); Hemp 90' | Report (FIFA); Report (UEFA) | | Stadium: Stoke Ground; Attendance: 24,174; Referee: Simona Ghisletta (Switzerland) |

| 13 November 2022 Friendly | Luxembourg | 2–3 | Lithuania | Rumelange, Luxembourg |
| 18:30 | Thompson 30'; MIller 48' | Fussball-Lux | ?; ?; ? | Stadium: Stade Municipal, Rumelange; Attendance: 373; Referee: Jelena Medjedovic (Serbia) |

=== 2023 ===
| 17 February 2023 Friendly | Malta | 2–1 | Luxembourg | Ta' Qali, Malta |
| 18:00 | Begeja 36' (pen.), 67' | MFA; Fussball-Lux | Lourenco Magalhães 15' | Stadium: Centenary Stadium; Referee: Maria Marotta (Italy) |

| 20 February 2023 Friendly | Malta | 3–1 | Luxembourg | Ta' Qali, Malta |
| 11:00 | Willis 3', 12'; Flask 50' | MFA; Fussball-Lux | Thompson 28' | Stadium: Centenary Stadium; Referee: Maria Marotta (Italy) |

| 5 April 2023 Friendly | Luxembourg | 5–5 | Faroe Islands | Luxembourg City, Luxembourg |
| 19:30 | Albert 5'; Thompson 7', 77', 89'; Estévez García 75' | Fussball-Lux | ?; ?; ?; ?; ? | Stadium: Stade Achille Hammerel; Attendance: 468; Referee: Audrey Gerbel (France) |

| 8 April 2023 Friendly | Luxembourg | 2–1 | Faroe Islands | Parc Hosingen, Luxembourg |
| 18:30 | Thompson 49'; MIller 90+1' | Fussball-Lux | ? ] | Stadium: Stade Georges Wohlfart; Attendance: 312; Referee: Audrey Gerbel (France) |

| 22 September 2023 UEFA Nations League 2023–24 | Lithuania | 0–2 | Luxembourg | Jonava, Lithuania |
| 16:00 (17:00 EEST) | | Report | Thompson 8'; Estévez García 15' (pen.) | Stadium: Jonava City Stadium; Attendance: 470; Referee: Lotta Vuorio (Finland) |

| 26 September 2023 UEFA Nations League 2023–24 | Luxembourg | 1–1 | Georgia | Esch-sur-Alzette, Luxembourg |
| 19:30 | Lourenco Magalhães 34' | Report | Cheminava 27' | Stadium: Stade Émile Mayrisch; Attendance: 546; Referee: Eirini Pingiou (Greece) |

| 27 October 2023 UEFA Nations League 2023–24 | Luxembourg | 0–4 | Turkey | Esch-sur-Alzette, Luxembourg |
| | | Report | Sadıkoğlu 21', 45+2'; Topçu 52' (pen.); Karabulut 84' | Stadium: Stade Émile Mayrisch; Attendance: 686; Referee: Miriama Bočková (Slovakia) |

| 31 October 2023 UEFA Nations League 2023–24 | Turkey | 1–0 | Luxembourg | Çorum, Turkey |
| | Sadıkoğlu 14' | Report | | Stadium: Çorum Şehir Stadium; Attendance: 12,130; Referee: Maral Mirzai Beni (Sweden) |

| 1 December 2023 UEFA Nations League 2023–24 | Georgia | 4–2 | Luxembourg | Tbilisi, Georgia |
| 14:00 (17:00 GET) | Bakradze 66'; Tchkonia 79'; Bukhrikidze 86'; Danelia 90+7' | Report | Machado 19'; Thompson 26' | Stadium: Mikheil Meskhi Stadium; Attendance: 375; Referee: Lisa Benn (England) |

| 5 December 2023 UEFA Nations League 2023–24 | Luxembourg | 1–1 | Lithuania | Differdange, Luxembourg |
| 16:00 | Lourenco Magalhães 26' | Report | Giržutaitė 86' | Stadium: Stade Municipal de la Ville de Differdange; Attendance: 283; Referee: Franziska Wildfeuer (Germany) |

=== 2024 ===
| 5 April 2024 UEFA Euro 2025 Qualifying | Luxembourg | 2–1 | Albania | Esch-sur-Alzette, Luxembourg |
| 19:30 | Schmit 68'; Thompson 87' | Report | Gjini 43' | Stadium: Stade Émile Mayrisch; Attendance: 511; Referee: Marina Zechner (Austria) |

| 4 June 2024 UEFA Euro 2025 Qualifying | Albania | 3–1 | Luxembourg | Elbasan, Albania |
| 18:00 | Doçi 29' (pen.); Krasniqi 45+2'; F. Berisha 46' | Report | Kremer 90+1' | Stadium: Elbasan Arena; Attendance: 700; Referee: Melek Dakan (Turkey) |

| 12 July 2024 UEFA Euro 2025 Qualifying | Luxembourg | 1–1 | Estonia | Esch-sur-Alzette, Luxembourg |
| 19:30 | Miller 48' | Report | Tammik 53' | Stadium: Stade Émile Mayrisch; Attendance: 587; Referee: Tjaša Misja (Slovenia) |

| 16 July 2024 UEFA Euro 2025 Qualifying | Estonia | 1–1 | Luxembourg | Tartu, Estonia |
| 19:00 (20:00 UTC+3) | Teern 49' | Report | Thompson 18' | Stadium: Tamme Stadium; Attendance: 566; Referee: Teona Sturua (Georgia) |

| October 25, 2024 UEFA Euro 2025 Qualifying R1 | Luxembourg | 0–4 | Sweden | Esch-sur-Alzette, Luxembourg |
| 19:30 | | Report | Angeldal 26'; Rytting Kaneryd 31'; Blackstenius 81'; Ijeh 90+3' | Stadium: Stade Émile Mayrisch; Attendance: 1,295; Referee: Alexandra Collin (France) |

| October 29, 2024 UEFA Euro 2025 Qualifying R1 | Sweden | 8–0 | Luxembourg | Gothenburg, Sweden |
| 19:00 | Angeldal 9', 30' (pen.); Rytting Kaneryd 11'; Zigiotti Olme 40'; Blackstenius 45'; Schmit 45+2' (o.g.); Blomqvist 63', 87' | Report | | Stadium: Gamla Ullevi; Attendance: 10,523; Referee: Réka Molnar (Hungary) |

=== 2025 ===
| 21 February 2025 UEFA Nations League 2025 | Luxembourg | 2–2 | Kazakhstan | Esch-sur-Alzette, Luxembourg |
| 19:30 | Estévez García 50' (pen.); Miller 73' | Report | Nizamutdinova 34', 41' | Stadium: Stade Emile Mayrisch; Attendance: 503; Referee: Rita Vehapi (Kosovo) |

| 25 February 2025 UEFA Nations League 2025 | Luxembourg | 7–0 | Liechtenstein | Esch-sur-Alzette, Luxembourg |
| 19:30 | Jorge 16', 39'; Thompson 44'; Estévez García 48' (pen.); Barbosa Abreu 68'; Miller 75'; C. Schmit 87' | Report | | Stadium: Stade Emile Mayrisch; Attendance: 395; Referee: Jeļena Jermolajeva (Latvia) |

| 4 April 2025 2025 UEFA Nations League group stage | Armenia | 1–3 | Luxembourg | Yerevan, Armenia |
| 13:00 | Karagezian 30' | Report (UEFA) | Thompson 4', 50'; C. Schmit 19' | Stadium: Yerevan Football Academy Stadium; Referee: Melissa Burgin (England) |

| 8 April 2025 2025 UEFA Nations League group stage | Liechtenstein | 2–3 | Luxembourg | Eschen, Liechtenstein |
| 17:30 | Risch 31'; Kindle 61' | Report | Thompson 11', 14'; Jorge 77' | Stadium: Sportpark Eschen-Mauren; Attendance: 384; Referee: Anastasiya Romanyuk (Ukraine) |

| 30 May 2025 2025 UEFA Nations League group stage | Luxembourg | 2–0 | Armenia | Beggen, Luxembourg |
| | Thompson 14'; Lourenco Magalhães 36' | Report | | Stadium: Stade rue Henri Dunant; Attendance: 1,156; Referee: Frederikke Lydia Søkjær (Denmark) |

| 3 June 2025 2025 UEFA Nations League group stage | Kazakhstan | 1–3 | Luxembourg | Almaty, Kazakhstan |
| 19:00 | Zhumabaikyzy 15' | Report | Miller 51'; Dos Santos 59'; Miny 90+3' | Stadium: Almaty Central Stadium; Referee: Victoria Beyer (France) |

| 24 October 2025 Friendly | Hungary | 4–0 | Luxembourg | Budapest, Hungary |
| | Mayer 29'; Pusztai 30'; Kaján 65'; Csiszár 75' | Report | | Stadium: Hidegkuti Nándor Stadion; Referee: Jelena Kumer (Croatia) |

| 28 November 2025 Friendly | Cyprus | 3–2 | Luxembourg | Achnas, Cyprus |
| 14:00 | Michail 53'; McBeth 62'; Aristodimou 80' | Report | Thompson 58'; Kirps 83' | Stadium: Dasaki Stadium; Referee: Mari Toumazou (Cyprus) |

| 1 December Friendly | Cyprus | 0–3 | Luxembourg | Achnas, Cyprus |
| | | Report | Cusick 4' (o.g.); Dietrich 24'; Dos Santos 45' | Stadium: Dasaki Stadium |

=== 2026 ===
| 3 March 2027 FIFA Women's World Cup qualification | Luxembourg | 0–5 | Scotland | Esch-sur-Alzette, Luxembourg |
| | | Report | Weir 9', 37', 62'; Clark 27'; McGovern 88' | Stadium: Stade Émile Mayrisch; Referee: Kristina Georgieva (Bulgaria) |

| 7 March 2027 FIFA Women's World Cup qualification | Scotland | 7–0 | Luxembourg | Glasgow, Scotland |
| 17:00 (16:00 UTC) | McGovern 1', 32'; Clark 10', 55'; Davidson 78'; Lawton 89'; McAneny 90+4' | Report (FIFA); Report (UEFA) | | Stadium: Hampden Park; Referee: Nanna Løf Andersen (Denmark) |

| 14 April 2027 FIFA Women's World Cup qualification | Israel | 6–0 | Luxembourg | Budaörs, Hungary |
| | Kats 10', 44'; Selimhodzic 13'; Ben Israel 18', 40'; Blokhin 83' | Report (UEFA) | | Stadium: BSC Stadium; Attendance: 0 (behind closed doors); Referee: Maria Marotta (Italy) |

| 18 April 2027 FIFA Women's World Cup qualification | Luxembourg | 1–3 | Israel | Budaörs, Hungary |
| 18:00 | Dos Santos 7' | Report (FIFA); Report (UEFA) | Kats 10', 34'; Selimhodzic 37' | Stadium: BSC Stadium; Attendance: 0 (behind closed doors); Referee: Jelena Medjedovic (Serbia) |

| 5 June 2027 FIFA Women's World Cup qualification | Belgium | 6–0 | Luxembourg | Leuven, Belgium |
| 20:15 | Eurlings 11'; Wullaert 19', 46', 66'; Janssens 74', 76' | Report (FIFA); Report (UEFA) | | Stadium: Den Dreef; Referee: Ana Maria Terteleac (Romania) |

| 9 June 2027 FIFA Women's World Cup qualification | Luxembourg | 0–7 | Belgium | Esch-sur-Alzette, Luxembourg |
| | | Report (FIFA); Report (UEFA); Report (FLF) | Wullaert 20'; Tysiak 45', 66'; Detruyer 61'; Eurlings 82', 89'; Iliano 88' | Stadium: Stade de la Frontière; Attendance: 1,053; Referee: Aleksandra Česen (Slovenia) |

| 9 October Friendly | Malta | 1–0 | Luxembourg | Ta' Qali, Malta |
| 19:00 | Bugeja 57' | Report | | Stadium: Centenary Stadium; Attendance: 600; Referee: Charlotte Carpenter (Wales |

| 13 October Friendly | Luxembourg | 0–4 | Montenegro | Rumelange, Luxembourg |
| 19:00 | | Report | Kuč 15'; Dešić 17', 40'; Faria 49' (o.g.) | Stadium: Stade Municipal; Attendance: 605; Referee: Karoline Wacker (Germany) |
