= List of Luxembourg women's international footballers =

The Luxembourg women's national football team represents the nation of Luxembourg in international women's association football. It is controlled by the Luxembourg Football Federation, the governing body of football in Luxembourg, and competes as a member of UEFA.

Luxembourg women played their first ever international match on 18 November 2006, in a preliminary qualifying match for Euro 2009 against Slovakia; it resulted in a 0–4 defeat.

== List of Luxembourg women's international footballers ==
The following is a list of all players who have played for Luxembourg in an official, senior international match and earning more than 10 caps.

All statistics are correct up to and including the match played on 13 October 2026 against Montenegro. The most recent match is highlighted in yellow.

Luxembourg women's national football team players with more than 10 caps
Player	Pos.	Caps	Goals	Debuta		Last or most recent match	
Player	Pos.	Caps	Goals	Date	Opponent	Date	Opponent
Marta Estévez García	MF	59	6	29 June 2016	United Arab Emirates	13 October 2026	Montenegro
Amy Thompson	MF	56	35	3 March 2011	Latvia	9 June 2026	Belgium
Kimberley Dos Santos	MF	56	5	26 June 2016	United Arab Emirates	13 October 2026	Montenegro
Laura Miller	MF	44	7	3 March 2018	Morocco	13 October 2026	Montenegro
Lucie Schlimé	GK	43		9 November 2019	Kosovo	9 October 2026	Malta
Emma Kremer	DF	42	1	3 March 2018	Morocco	13 October 2026	Montenegro
Jessica Birkel	ST	40	7	18 November 2006	Slovakia	3 March 2018	Morocco
Joana Lourenco Magalhães	ST	39	10	12 June 2021	Belgium	9 October 2026	Malta
Andreia Machado	DF	36	3	5 April 2012	Malta	9 June 2026	Belgium
Charlotte Schmit	DF	36	3	11 April 2021	Liechtenstein	13 October 2026	Montenegro
Caroline Jorge	MF	33	5	11 April 2021	Liechtenstein	9 October 2026	Malta
Marisa Soares Marques	MF	30	0	10 November 2018	Andorra	12 July 2024	Estonia
Isabel Albert	DF	28	1	20 September 2020	Bulgaria	8 April 2025	Liechtenstein
Rosangela Settanni	MF	26	3	18 November 2006	Slovakia	9 April 2013	Albania
Pascale Frising	DF	25	1	18 October 2009	Israel	11 April 2017	Montenegro
Ana Abreu Barbosa	DF	24	1	20 February 2023	Malta	13 October 2026	Montenegro
Jessica Berscheid	DF	24	0	12 February 2014	Poland	21 September 2021	England
Catarina Lavinas	ST	24	0	21 June 2019	Andorra	13 October 2026	Montenegro
Edina Kocan	MF	24	0	20 September 2020	Bulgaria	9 June 2026	Belgium
Gabriela De Lemos	MF	23	5	20 March 2013	Estonia	19 February 2022	Tahiti
Julie Marques Abreu	ST	22	6	21 June 2019	Andorra	4 June 2024	Albania
Leila Schmit	DF	22	0	13 November 2022	Lithuania	13 October 2026	Montenegro
Janine Hansen	ST	21	10	18 November 2006	Slovakia	9 April 2013	Albania
Catherine Have	MF	21	0	20 March 2013	Estonia	6 September 2022	England
Anne Bourg	DF	20	0	28 November 2012	Faroe Islands	11 April 2017	Montenegro
Joëlle Leuchter	MF	19	2	18 November 2006	Slovakia	9 April 2013	Albania
Noémie Raths	DF	19	0	15 May 2008	Faroe Islands	30 November 2021	Austria
Sophie Maurer	ST	18	6	18 October 2009	Israel	29 June 2016	United Arab Emirates
Carina Nogueria	DF	16	1	29 October 2007	Bosnia and Herzegovina	28 November 2012	Faroe Islands
Leticia Mateus	DF	16	0	13 November 2022	Lithuania	18 April 2026	Israel
Sandy Sauber	MF	15	1	12 February 2014	Poland	11 April 2017	Montenegro
Cristina Da Silva Correria	ST	15	0	18 November 2006	Slovakia	18 October 2009	Israel
Lynn Ruppert	MF	15	0	18 November 2006	Slovakia	9 April 2015	Moldova
Sarah Elias	DF	15	0	5 April 2012	Malta	11 April 2017	Montenegro
Tamara Cardoso	GK	15		29 October 2014	Lithuania	21 June 2019	Andorra
Jill De Bruyn	MF	14	0	3 March 2018	Morocco	28 June 2022	Belgium
Rita Leite	DF	13	1	29 June 2016	United Arab Emirates	9 June 2026	Belgium
Catherine Keipes	GK	13		18 November 2006	Slovakia	3 March 2018	Morocco
Nathalie Thill	GK	13		30 September 2008	Wales	9 April 2013	Albania
Kelly Mendes	MF	13	0	12 February 2014	Poland	6 September 2022	England
Jessica Becker	DF	13	0	7 October 2018	Estonia	31 October 2023	Turkey
Karen Marin	MF	12	6	4 April 2015	Latvia	25 November 2018	Singapore
Rachel Kirps	FW	12	1	19 June 2022	Cape Verde	13 September 2026	Montenegro
Martine Kraus	DF	12	0	18 November 2006	Slovakia	10 June 2009	Latvia
Noémie Tiberi	MF	12	0	8 March 2011	Lithuania	6 September 2022	England
Hannah Dietrich	FW	12	0	30 May 2025	Armenia	13 October 2026	Montenegro
Nathalie Ludwig	ST	11	1	16 February 2022	Tahiti	8 April 2025	Liechtenstein
Romy Gruber	MF	11	0	3 March 2011	Latvia	12 February 2014	Poland
Susanna Scarano	DF	11	0	18 November 2006	Slovakia	10 June 2009	Latvia
Carine Gindt	MF	11	0	18 November 2006	Slovakia	29 October 2008	Lithuania
Anouchka Besch	ST	11	0	4 November 2016	Faroe Islands	5 June 2026	Belgium
Maité Machado Palma	ST	10	2	26 June 2016	United Arab Emirates	21 June 2019	Andorra
Anna Miny	MF	10	1	31 October 2023	Turkey	13 October 2026	Montenegro
Senada Ceman	MF	10	0	29 October 2014	Lithuania	21 June 2019	Andorra
Jil Kalmes	MF	10	0	4 November 2016	Faroe Islands	9 November 2019	Kosovo
Sadine Correia	DF	10	0	3 March 2018	Morocco	28 June 2022	Belgium

== See also ==
- Category:Luxembourg women's international footballers
- Luxembourg women's national football team#Current squad
