= 2023–24 UEFA Women's Nations League C =

Tournament details
- Dates: 22 September – 5 December 2023
- Teams: 19
- Promoted: Azerbaijan; Israel; Kosovo; Malta; Turkey

Tournament statistics
- Matches played: 54
- Goals scored: 154 (2.85 per match)
- Attendance: 40,264 (746 per match)
- Top scorer(s): (Israel) Sharon Beck (9 goals)
- Women's European Qualifiers Women's Nations League

The 2023–24 UEFA Women's Nations League C was the third and lowest division of the 2023–24 edition of the UEFA Women's Nations League, the inaugural season of the international football competition involving the women's national teams of the member associations of UEFA. The results were used to determine the leagues for the UEFA Women's Euro 2025 qualifying competition.

== Format ==
League C consisted of the bottom 19 UEFA members ranked 33rd to 51st among competition entrants in the UEFA women's national team coefficient ranking. Teams were split into four groups of four (Groups 1 to 4) and one group of three (Group 5). Each team played four (three-team group) or six (four-team groups) matches within their group, using the home-and-away round-robin format with double matchdays in September, October and November to December 2023. The competition also acted as the first phase of the preliminary competition for UEFA Women's Euro 2025, which uses an identical league structure. The group winners were promoted to League B, taking effect in UEFA Women's Euro 2025 qualifying. In addition, the three best-ranked League C runners-up advanced to the promotion play-offs against the three best-ranked third-placed teams in League B. The winners of these home-and-away ties entered League B for UEFA Women's Euro 2025 qualifying, while the losers entered League C.

== Seeding ==
Teams were allocated to League C according to their UEFA women's national team coefficient after the conclusion of the 2023 FIFA Women's World Cup qualifying group stage on 6 September 2022. Teams were split into three pots of five teams (Pots 1 to 4) and one pot of four teams (Pot 5), ordered based on their UEFA national team coefficient.

The draw for the league phase took place at the UEFA headquarters in Nyon, Switzerland in May 2023, 13:00 CEST. Groups 1 to 4 contained one team from each pot, while Group 5 contained one team from Pots 1 to 3. The draw started with Pot 1 and ended with Pot 4, with drawn teams assigned to the first available group in ascending order from C1 to C5. Due to the Nagorno-Karabakh conflict, Armenia and Azerbaijan could not be drawn in the same group. Due to winter venue restrictions, a group could contain a maximum of two of Estonia, the Faroe Islands, Latvia and Lithuania. Due to excessive travel restrictions, only one of Andorra, the Faroe Islands and Malta could be drawn with Kazakhstan.

Pot 1
Team	Coeff	Rank
Malta	16,021	34
Israel	15,543	35
Azerbaijan	14,876	36
Turkey	14,865	37
North Macedonia	14,483	38

Pot 2
Team	Coeff	Rank
Kosovo	14,226	39
Montenegro	12,668	40
Luxembourg	12,051	41
Estonia	9,750	42
Moldova	9,654	43

Pot 3
Team	Coeff	Rank
Lithuania	9,649	44
Kazakhstan	8,662	45
Latvia	8,543	46
Bulgaria	8,200	47
Cyprus	8,032	48

Pot 4
Team	Coeff	Rank
Faroe Islands	7,020	49
Georgia	6,977	50
Armenia	6,500	51
Andorra	1,958	52

== Groups ==
Times are CET/CEST, (Note: CEST (UTC+2) for times up to 28 October 2023, CET (UTC+1) for times from 29 October 2023.) as listed by UEFA (local times, if different, are in parentheses).

=== Group 1 ===
Pos	Team	Pld	W	D	L	GF	GA	GD	Pts	Promotion or qualification	(Malta)	(Latvia)	(Andorra)	(Moldova)
1	Malta (P)	6	5	1	0	13	1	+12	16	Promotion to League B	—	2–1	5–0	2–0
2	Latvia	6	3	1	2	17	6	+11	10	Qualification for promotion play-offs	0–1	—	4–0	5–0
3	Andorra	6	1	1	4	2	17	−15	4		0–3	0–4	—	0–0
4	Moldova	6	0	3	3	4	12	−8	3		0–0	3–3	1–2	—

Source: UEFA
Rules for classification: Tiebreakers
(P) Promoted
22 September 2023
15:30 (16:30 EEST)

Latvia	0–1	Malta
	Report	Bugeja 83'

Sloka Stadium, Jūrmala
Attendance: 311
Referee: Jana Van Laere (Belgium)
22 September 2023
17:00 (18:00 EEST)

Moldova	1–2	Andorra
Topal 17'	Report	Fernández 28'; Del Barco 77'

CSR Orhei, Orhei
Attendance: 200
Referee: Marina Zechner (Austria)

26 September 2023
19:00

Andorra	0–4	Latvia
	Report	Miksone 15', 26', 45+4'; Zaičikova 36'

Estadi Nacional, Andorra la Vella
Attendance: 813
Referee: Nanna Løf Andersen (Denmark)
26 September 2023
20:00

Malta	2–0	Moldova
Bugeja 46', 58'	Report

Centenary Stadium, Ta' Qali
Attendance: 674
Referee: Michaela Pachtova (Czech Republic)

27 October 2023
13:30 (14:30 EEST)

Latvia	5–0	Moldova
Suvitra 34', 39'; Ševcova 64'; Poļuhoviča 74', 76'	Report

Zemgale Olympic Center, Jelgava
Attendance: 137
Referee: Eirini Pingiou (Greece)
27 October 2023
20:00

Malta	5–0	Andorra
Bugeja 17', 46'; S. Farrugia 23'; M. Farrugia 74'; Cuschieri 77'	Report

Centenary Stadium, Ta' Qali
Attendance: 682
Referee: Melis Özçiğdem (Turkey)

31 October 2023
17:00 (18:00 EET)

Moldova	3–3	Latvia
Guțu 29'; Colesnicenco 53'; Cojuhari 78'	Report	Miksone 50', 90+1' (pen.); Voitāne 90+6'

Zimbru Stadium, Chișinău
Attendance: 300
Referee: Frederikke Lydia Søkjær (Denmark)
31 October 2023
19:00

Andorra	0–3	Malta
	Report	Bugeja 36', 40', 43' (pen.)

Estadi Nacional, Andorra la Vella
Attendance: 603
Referee: Sofik Torosyan (Armenia)

1 December 2023
12:00 (13:00 EET)

Latvia	4–0	Andorra
Ševcova 42', 45', 47'; Poļuhoviča 68'	Report

LNK Sporta Parks, Riga
Attendance: 69
Referee: Silvia Gasperotti (Italy)
1 December 2023
15:00 (16:00 EET)

Moldova	0–0	Malta
	Report

Zimbru Stadium, Chișinău
Attendance: 353
Referee: Louise Thompson (Northern Ireland)

5 December 2023
16:00

Andorra	0–0	Moldova
	Report

Estadi Nacional, Andorra la Vella
Attendance: 156
Referee: Ioanna Allayiotou (Cyprus)
5 December 2023
16:00

Malta	2–1	Latvia
Willis 58'; M. Farrugia 73'	Report	Miksone 50' (pen.)

Centenary Stadium, Ta' Qali
Attendance: 1,008
Referee: Rita Vehapi (Kosovo)

=== Group 2 ===
Pos	Team	Pld	W	D	L	GF	GA	GD	Pts	Promotion or qualification	(Turkey)	(Lithuania)	(Luxembourg)	(Georgia (country))
1	Turkey (P)	6	6	0	0	16	0	+16	18	Promotion to League B	—	2–0	1–0	2–0
2	Lithuania	6	1	2	3	4	9	−5	5 (Note: Ranked on head-to-head goal difference: Lithuania +1, Luxembourg 0, Georgia −1)		0–4	—	0–2	0–0
3	Luxembourg	6	1	2	3	6	11	−5	5		0–4	1–1	—	1–1
4	Georgia	6	1	2	3	5	11	−6	5		0–3	0–3	4–2	—

Source: UEFA
Rules for classification: Tiebreakers
(P) Promoted
Notes:
22 September 2023
16:00 (17:00 EEST)

Lithuania	0–2	Luxembourg
	Report	Thompson 8'; Estévez García 15' (pen.)

Jonava City Stadium, Jonava
Attendance: 470
Referee: Lotta Vuorio (Finland)
22 September 2023
16:00 (18:00 GET)

Georgia	0–3	Turkey
	Report	Cin 5'; Sadıkoğlu 41'; Uraz 71'

Mikheil Meskhi Stadium, Tbilisi
Attendance: 800
Referee: Audrey Gerbel (France)

26 September 2023
17:00 (18:00 TRT)

Turkey	2–0	Lithuania
Sadıkoğlu 29'; Civelek 85'	Report

Elazığ Atatürk Stadium, Elazığ
Attendance: 6,700
Referee: Rita Vehapi (Kosovo)
26 September 2023
19:30

Luxembourg	1–1	Georgia
Lourenco Magalhães 34'	Report	Cheminava 27'

Stade Émile Mayrisch, Esch-sur-Alzette
Attendance: 546
Referee: Eirini Pingiou (Greece)

27 October 2023
16:00 (17:00 EEST)

Lithuania	0–0	Georgia
	Report

LFF Stadium, Vilnius
Attendance: 83
Referee: Zoe Stavrou (Cyprus)
27 October 2023
19:30

Luxembourg	0–4	Turkey
	Report	Sadıkoğlu 21', 45+2'; Topçu 52' (pen.); Karabulut 84'

Stade Émile Mayrisch, Esch-sur-Alzette
Attendance: 686
Referee: Miriama Bočková (Slovakia)

31 October 2023
16:00 (19:00 GET)

Georgia	0–3	Lithuania
	Report	Grikšaitė 21'; Vaitukaitytė 58'; Giržutaitė 90+3'

Mikheil Meskhi Stadium, Tbilisi
Attendance: 793
Referee: Cristina Trandafir (Romania)
31 October 2023
17:00 (19:00 TRT)

Turkey	1–0	Luxembourg
Sadıkoğlu 14'	Report

Çorum Şehir Stadium, Çorum
Attendance: 12,130
Referee: Maral Mirzai Beni (Sweden)

1 December 2023
14:00 (17:00 GET)

Georgia	4–2	Luxembourg
Bakradze 66'; Tchkonia 79'; Bukhrikidze 86'; Danelia 90+7'	Report	Machado 19'; Thompson 26'

Mikheil Meskhi Stadium, Tbilisi
Attendance: 375
Referee: Lisa Benn (England)
1 December 2023
16:00 (17:00 EET)

Lithuania	0–4	Turkey
	Report	Hız 10'; Uraz 20'; Neverdauskaitė 53' (o.g.); Çal 89'

LFF Stadium, Vilnius
Attendance: 50
Referee: Olivia Tschon (Austria)

5 December 2023
16:00

Luxembourg	1–1	Lithuania
Lourenco Magalhães 26'	Report	Giržutaitė 86'

Stade Municipal de la Ville de Differdange, Differdange
Attendance: 283
Referee: Franziska Wildfeuer (Germany)
5 December 2023
16:00 (18:00 TRT)

Turkey	2–0	Georgia
Hız 26'; Türkoğlu 41'	Report

Mersin Stadium, Mersin
Attendance: 4,837
Referee: Jeļena Jermolajeva (Latvia)

=== Group 3 ===
Pos	Team	Pld	W	D	L	GF	GA	GD	Pts	Promotion or qualification	(Azerbaijan)	(Montenegro)	(Cyprus)	(Faroe Islands)
1	Azerbaijan (P)	6	5	1	0	9	2	+7	16	Promotion to League B	—	3–0	1–1	1–0
2	Montenegro	6	4	0	2	14	4	+10	12	Qualification for promotion play-offs	0–1	—	2–0	9–0
3	Cyprus	6	2	1	3	3	6	−3	7		0–1	0–2	—	1–0
4	Faroe Islands	6	0	0	6	1	15	−14	0		1–2	0–1	0–1	—

Source: UEFA
Rules for classification: Tiebreakers
(P) Promoted
22 September 2023
15:00 (17:00 AZT)

Azerbaijan	1–1	Cyprus
Jafarzade 46'	Report	Aristodimou 66'

Dalga Arena, Baku
Attendance: 165
Referee: Elena Gobjila (Moldova)
22 September 2023
19:00 (18:00 WEST)

Faroe Islands	0–1	Montenegro
	Report	Kuč 21'

Tórsvøllur, Tórshavn
Attendance: 963
Referee: Briet Bragadottir (Iceland)

26 September 2023
18:00 (19:00 EEST)

Cyprus	1–0	Faroe Islands
Violari 65'	Report

Dasaki Stadium, Dasaki Achnas
Attendance: 220
Referee: Maika Vanderstichel (France)
26 September 2023
18:00

Montenegro	0–1	Azerbaijan
	Report	Parlak 84'

DG Arena, Podgorica
Attendance: 250
Referee: Maral Mirzai Beni (Sweden)

27 October 2023
15:00 (14:00 WEST)

Faroe Islands	1–2	Azerbaijan
Christiansen 83'	Report	Bakarandze 30'; Mollayeva 50'

Við Djúpumýrar, Klaksvík
Attendance: 430
Referee: Jeļena Jermolajeva (Latvia)
27 October 2023
17:00 (18:00 EEST)

Cyprus	0–2	Montenegro
	Report	Kuč 22'; Šaranović 73'

Dasaki Stadium, Dasaki Achnas
Attendance: 200
Referee: Kateryna Usova (Ukraine)

31 October 2023
13:00 (16:00 AZT)

Azerbaijan	3–0	Montenegro
Mollayeva 58'; Parlak 62'; Ahmadova 84'	Report

Dalga Arena, Baku
Attendance: 145
Referee: Anastasiya Romanyuk (Ukraine)
31 October 2023
19:00 (18:00 WET)

Faroe Islands	0–1	Cyprus
	Report	Violari 33'

Tórsvøllur, Tórshavn
Attendance: 530
Referee: Vivian Peeters (Netherlands)

1 December 2023
13:00

Montenegro	9–0	Faroe Islands
Bulatović 8', 63'; Kuč 9', 18'; Dal Christiansen 55' (o.g.); Đoković 67', 90+3'; Vujadinović 73', 84'	Report

Podgorica City Stadium, Podgorica
Attendance: 75
Referee: Marina Zechner (Austria)
1 December 2023
18:00 (19:00 EET)

Cyprus	0–1	Azerbaijan
	Report	Mammadova 8'

Alphamega Stadium, Limassol
Attendance: 283
Referee: Caroline Lanssens (Belgium)

5 December 2023
16:00 (19:00 AZT)

Azerbaijan	1–0	Faroe Islands
Mirzaliyeva 68'	Report

Dalga Arena, Baku
Attendance: 200
Referee: Lovisa Johansson (Sweden)
5 December 2023
16:00

Montenegro	2–0	Cyprus
Bulatović 46'; Kuć 76'	Report

DG Arena, Podgorica
Attendance: 90
Referee: Teresa Oliveira (Portugal)

=== Group 4 ===
Pos	Team	Pld	W	D	L	GF	GA	GD	Pts	Promotion or qualification	(Israel)	(Estonia)	(Kazakhstan)	(Armenia)
1	Israel (P)	6	5	1	0	21	2	+19	16	Promotion to League B	—	4–1	0–0	6–1
2	Estonia	6	3	1	2	11	11	0	10		0–5	—	0–0	5–1
3	Kazakhstan	6	2	2	2	6	5	+1	8		0–2	0–1	—	4–1
4	Armenia	6	0	0	6	5	25	−20	0		0–4	1–4	1–2	—

Source: UEFA
Rules for classification: Tiebreakers
(P) Promoted
22 September 2023
17:00 (18:00 EEST)

Estonia	0–0	Kazakhstan
	Report

Tamme Stadium, Tartu
Attendance: 334
Referee: Caroline Lanssens (Belgium)

26 September 2023
14:00 (16:00 AMT)

Armenia	1–2	Kazakhstan
Asatryan 54'	Report	Turlybekova 27'; Orynbassarova 57'

Armavir City Stadium, Armavir
Attendance: 350
Referee: Vera Opeykina (Russia)
26 September 2023
18:00 (19:00 EEST)

Estonia	0–5	Israel
	Report	Sharabi 7'; Shtainshnaider 17'; Selimhodzic 60'; Kats 75'; Beck 90+2'

Tamme Stadium, Tartu
Attendance: 337
Referee: Lisa Benn (England)

27 October 2023
17:30 (19:30 AMT)

Armenia	1–4	Estonia
Ghukasyan 70'	Report	Tammik 25', 48', 60'; Treiberg 64'

Vazgen Sargsyan Republican Stadium, Yerevan
Attendance: 120
Referee: Lotta Vuorio (Finland)

31 October 2023
17:00 (18:00 EET)

Estonia	5–1	Armenia
Tammik 8', 90+2'; Treiberg 23', 38'; Himanen 76'	Report	Pizlova 56'

Lilleküla Stadium, Tallinn
Attendance: 342
Referee: Elena Gobjila (Moldova)

23 November 2023 (Note: Match originally scheduled for 26 October 2023.)
13:00

Kazakhstan	0–2	Israel
	Report	Awad 14'; Avital 38'

Globall Football Park, Telki (Hungary) (Note: Both Kazakhstan-Israel matches were moved to a neutral venue in Hungary.)
Attendance: 0 (behind closed doors)
Referee: Simona Ghisletta (Switzerland)

26 November 2023 (Note: Match originally scheduled for 31 October 2023.)
13:00

Israel	0–0	Kazakhstan
	Report

Globall Football Park, Telki (Hungary)
Attendance: 20
Referee: Cansu Tryak (Turkey)

29 November 2023 (Note: Match originally scheduled for 30 November 2023.)
12:00 (15:00 AMT)

Armenia	0–4	Israel
	Report	Sommer 55'; Beck 67', 86', 90+2' (pen.)

Armavir City Stadium, Armavir
Attendance: 150
Referee: Fabienne Michel (Germany)
1 December 2023
15:00 (20:00 ALMT)

Kazakhstan	0–1	Estonia
	Report	Bannikova 6'

Astana Arena, Astana
Attendance: 386
Referee: Kirsty Dowle (England)

2 December 2023 (Note: Match originally scheduled for 21 September 2023.)
12:00 (15:00 AMT)

Israel	6–1	Armenia
Almasri 22'; M. Karapetyan 33' (o.g.); Beck 43', 59'; Avital 45'; Selimhodzic 72'	Report	Dallakyan 57'

Vazgen Sargsyan Republican Stadium, Yerevan (Armenia) (Note: Due to the Gaza war, Israel played their "home" matches outside of Israel.)
Attendance: 110
Referee: Irena Velevačkoska (North Macedonia)

5 December 2023
16:00

Israel	4–1	Estonia
Beck 3', 47', 55'; Elinav 39'	Report	Tammik 80'

Globall Football Park, Telki (Hungary)
Attendance: 3
Referee: Maïka Vanderstichel (France)
5 December 2023
16:00 (21:00 ALMT)

Kazakhstan	4–1	Armenia
Myasnikova 40', 58'; Gaistenova 48'; Kulmagambetova 71'	Report	Portnova 68' (o.g.)

Astana Arena, Astana
Attendance: 237
Referee: Jurgita Mačikunytė (Lithuania)

=== Group 5 ===
Pos	Team	Pld	W	D	L	GF	GA	GD	Pts	Promotion or qualification	(Kosovo)	(Bulgaria)	(North Macedonia)
1	Kosovo (P)	4	3	1	0	10	2	+8	10	Promotion to League B	—	5–1	3–1
2	Bulgaria	4	1	2	1	4	7	−3	5	Qualification for promotion play-offs	0–0	—	2–2
3	North Macedonia	4	0	1	3	3	8	−5	1		0–2	0–1	—

Source: UEFA
Rules for classification: Tiebreakers
(P) Promoted
22 September 2023
15:00

North Macedonia	0–1	Bulgaria
	Report	Stankova 4'

Petar Miloševski Training Centre, Skopje
Attendance: 200
Referee: Miriama Bočková (Slovakia)

26 September 2023
17:00 (18:00 EEST)

Bulgaria	0–0	Kosovo
	Report

Stadion Lokomotiv, Plovdiv
Attendance: 223
Referee: Lovisa Johansson (Sweden)

27 October 2023
13:00

North Macedonia	0–2	Kosovo
	Report	Limani 20'; Metaj 41'

Petar Miloševski Training Centre, Skopje
Attendance: 170
Referee: Michaela Pachtova (Czech Republic)

31 October 2023
17:00

Kosovo	3–1	North Macedonia
Halilaj 7' (pen.); Memeti 14'; Biqkaj 34'	Report	Cokleska 90'

Fadil Vokrri Stadium, Pristina
Attendance: 300
Referee: Silvia Domingos (Portugal)

1 December 2023
13:00

Kosovo	5–1	Bulgaria
Halilaj 39'; Metaj 58'; Uka 71'; Memeti 84', 89'	Report	Ivanova 26'

Zahir Pajaziti Stadium, Podujevë
Attendance: 120
Referee: Melis Özçiğdem (Turkey)

5 December 2023
16:00 (17:00 EET)

Bulgaria	2–2	North Macedonia
Zheleva 85'; Rasina 90+5'	Report	Rochi 11'; Maksuti 62'

Vasil Levski National Stadium, Sofia
Attendance: 252
Referee: Victoria Beyer (France)

== Ranking of second-placed teams ==
Due to differing group sizes in League C, results against fourth-placed teams were disregarded when ranking second-placed teams.

Pos	Grp	Team	Pld	W	D	L	GF	GA	GD	Pts	Qualification
1	C1	Latvia	4	2	0	2	9	3	+6	6	Qualification for promotion play-offs
2	C3	Montenegro	4	2	0	2	4	4	0	6	Qualification for promotion play-offs
3	C5	Bulgaria	4	1	2	1	4	7	−3	5	Qualification for promotion play-offs
4	C4	Estonia	4	1	1	2	2	9	−7	4	
5	C2	Lithuania	4	0	1	3	1	9	−8	1	

Source: UEFA
Rules for classification: Tiebreakers - not considering results against teams ranked fourth in each group

== Overall ranking ==
The 19 League C teams were ranked 33rd to 51st overall in the 2023–24 UEFA Women's Nations League according to the following rules:

- The teams finishing first in their groups were ranked 33rd to 37th according to the results of the league phase.
- The teams finishing second in their groups were ranked 38th to 42nd according to the results of the league phase.
- The teams finishing third in their groups were ranked 43rd to 47th according to the results of the league phase.
- The teams finishing fourth in their groups were ranked 48th to 51st according to the results of the league phase.

Due to League C being composed of different sized groups, the results against the fourth-placed teams were not taken into account when comparing teams finishing first, second, and third in their groups.

Rnk	Grp	Team	Pld	W	D	L	GF	GA	GD	Pts	Promotion
33	C2	Turkey	4	4	0	0	11	0	+11	12	Promotion to League B
34	C1	Malta	4	4	0	0	11	1	+10	12	Promotion to League B
35	C4	Israel	4	3	1	0	11	1	+10	10	Promotion to League B
36	C5	Kosovo	4	3	1	0	10	2	+8	10	Promotion to League B
37	C3	Azerbaijan	4	3	1	0	6	1	+5	10	Promotion to League B
38	C1	Latvia	4	2	0	2	9	3	+6	6	Qualification for promotion play-offs
39	C3	Montenegro	4	2	0	2	4	4	0	6	Qualification for promotion play-offs
40	C5	Bulgaria	4	1	2	1	4	7	−3	5	Qualification for promotion play-offs
41	C4	Estonia	4	1	1	2	2	9	−7	4	
42	C2	Lithuania	4	0	1	3	1	9	−8	1	
43	C2	Luxembourg	4	1	1	2	3	6	−3	4	
44	C4	Kazakhstan	4	0	2	2	0	3	−3	2	
45	C5	North Macedonia	4	0	1	3	3	8	−5	1	
46	C3	Cyprus	4	0	1	3	1	6	−5	1	
47	C1	Andorra	4	0	0	4	0	16	−16	0	
48	C2	Georgia	6	1	2	3	5	11	−6	5	
49	C1	Moldova	6	0	3	3	4	12	−8	3	
50	C3	Faroe Islands	6	0	0	6	1	15	−14	0	
51	C4	Armenia	6	0	0	6	5	25	−20	0	

Source: UEFA
Rules for classification: Ranking criteria

== Goalscorers ==
There were 154 goals scored in 54 matches, for an average of 2.85 goals per match.

9 goals

- (Israel) Sharon Beck

8 goals

- (Malta) Haley Bugeja

6 goals

- (Estonia) Lisette Tammik
- (Latvia) Karlīna Miksone

5 goals

- (Montenegro) Armisa Kuč
- (Turkey) Birgül Sadıkoğlu

4 goals

- (Latvia) Olga Ševcova

3 goals

- (Estonia) Emma Treiberg
- (Kosovo) Erëleta Memeti
- (Latvia) Anastasija Poļuhoviča
- (Montenegro) Slađana Bulatović

2 goals

- (Azerbaijan) Mana Mollayeva
- (Azerbaijan) Nazlıcan Parlak
- (Cyprus) Antri Violari
- (Israel) Eden Avital
- (Israel) Noa Selimhodzic
- (Kazakhstan) Yulia Myasnikova
- (Kosovo) Donjeta Halilaj
- (Kosovo) Valentina Metaj
- (Latvia) Diāna Suvitra
- (Lithuania) Emilija Giržutaitė
- (Luxembourg) Joana Lourenco Magalhães
- (Luxembourg) Amy Thompson
- (Malta) Maria Farrugia
- (Montenegro) Jasna Đoković
- (Montenegro) Jelena Vujadinović
- (Turkey) Gülbin Hız
- (Turkey) Yağmur Uraz

1 goal

- (Andorra) Sonia Del Barco
- (Andorra) Marina Fernández
- (Armenia) Veronika Asatryan
- (Armenia) Anna Dallakyan
- (Armenia) Ani Ghukasyan
- (Armenia) Oksanna Pizlova
- (Azerbaijan) Ayshan Ahmadova
- (Azerbaijan) Kristina Bakarandze
- (Azerbaijan) Sevinj Jafarzade
- (Azerbaijan) Diana Mammadova
- (Azerbaijan) Nigar Mirzaliyeva
- (Bulgaria) Dimitra Ivanova
- (Bulgaria) Polina Rasina
- (Bulgaria) Yoana Stankova
- (Bulgaria) Leonora Zheleva
- (Cyprus) Elena Aristodimou
- (Estonia) Kristina Bannikova
- (Estonia) Kairi Himanen
- (Faroe Islands) Sunniva Dal Christiansen
- (Georgia (country)) Teona Bakradze
- (Georgia (country)) Nino Bukhrikidze
- (Georgia (country)) Ana Cheminava
- (Georgia (country)) Natia Danelia
- (Georgia (country)) Khatia Tchkonia
- (Israel) Maria Almasri
- (Israel) Marian Awad
- (Israel) Shira Elinav
- (Israel) Vital Kats
- (Israel) Meytal Sharabi
- (Israel) Rachel Steinschneider
- (Israel) Talia Sommer
- (Kazakhstan) Aida Gaistenova
- (Kazakhstan) Kamila Kulmagambetova
- (Kazakhstan) Arailym Orynbassarova
- (Kazakhstan) Asselkhan Turlybekova
- (Kosovo) Kaltrina Biqkaj
- (Kosovo) Valentina Limani
- (Kosovo) Modesta Uka
- (Latvia) Sandra Voitāne
- (Latvia) Viktorija Zaičikova
- (Lithuania) Monika Grikšaitė
- (Lithuania) Liucija Vaitukaitytė
- (Luxembourg) Marta Estévez García
- (Luxembourg) Andreia Machado
- (Malta) Rachel Cuschieri
- (Malta) Stefania Farrugia
- (Malta) Kailey Willis
- (Moldova) Veronica Cojuhari
- (Moldova) Nadejda Colesnicenco
- (Moldova) Felicia Guțu
- (Moldova) Irina Topal
- (Montenegro) Maja Šaranović
- (North Macedonia) Olivera Cokleska
- (North Macedonia) Ulza Maksuti
- (North Macedonia) Gentjana Rochi
- (Turkey) Meryem Cennet Çal
- (Turkey) Miray Cin
- (Turkey) İlayda Civelek
- (Turkey) Arzu Karabulut
- (Turkey) Ebru Topçu
- (Turkey) Ece Türkoğlu

1 own goal

- (Armenia) Marine Karapetyan (against Israel)
- (Faroe Islands) Sunniva Dal Christiansen (against Montenegro)
- (Kazakhstan) Angelina Portnova (against Armenia)
- (Lithuania) Vestina Neverdauskaitė (against Turkey)
