= Rachel Bettmer =

Luxembourgish footballer (born 1994)

Personal information
- Date of birth: 5 June 1994 (age 32)
- Position: Midfielder

Senior career*
Years	Team	Apps	(Gls)
2016–2019	Progrès Niederkorn		

International career
2009–2012	Luxembourg	8	(0)
- * Club domestic league appearances and goals

Rachel Bettmer (born 5 June 1994) is a former Luxembourgish footballer who played for the Luxembourg national team.
