= Schlimé =

Schlimé is a surname. Notable people with the surname include:

- Francesco Tristano Schlimé (born 1981), Luxembourgish classical and experimental pianist and composer
- Lucie Schlimé (born 2003), Luxembourgish footballer
