= Laura Miller (footballer) =

Luxembourgish footballer

Personal information
- Full name: Laura Miller
- Date of birth: 7 December 2001 (age 24)
- Position: Midfielder

Team information
- Current team: Nürnberg
- Number: 9

Youth career
- 2019–2021: Metz

Senior career*
Years	Team	Apps	(Gls)
2017–2019	Jeunesse Junglinster		
2021–2025	Standard Liège	74	(1)
2025–	Nürnberg	30	(1)

International career^{‡}
2019–	Luxembourg	44	(7)
- * Club domestic league appearances and goals as of 22 November 2026 ‡ National team caps and goals as of 13 October 2026

Laura Miller (born 7 December 2001) is a Luxembourgish footballer who plays as a midfielder for Frauen-Bundesliga club Nürnberg and the Luxembourg women's national team.

== International career ==
Miller made her senior debut for Luxembourg on 3 March 2018 during a 0–5 friendly win against Kosovo.

=== International goals ===
#	Date	Venue	Opponent	Score	Result	Competition
1.	16 February 2022	Stade François Trausch, Mamer, Luxembourg	Tahiti	2–0	5–0	Friendly
2.	13 November 2022	Stade Municipal, Rumelange, Rumelange, Luxembourg	Lithuania	2–3	2–3	Friendly
3.	8 April 2023	Stade Georges Wohlfart, Parc Hosingen, Luxembourg	Faroe Islands	2–1	2–1	Friendly
4.	12 July 2024	Stade Emile Mayrisch, Esch-sur-Alzette, Luxembourg	Estonia	1–0	1–1	UEFA Women's Euro 2025 qualifying
5.	21 February 2025	Stade Emile Mayrisch, Esch-sur-Alzette, Luxembourg	Kazakhstan	2–2	2–2	2025 UEFA Nations League
6.	25 February 2025	Stade Emile Mayrisch, Esch-sur-Alzette, Luxembourg	Liechtenstein	6–0	7–0	2025 UEFA Nations League
7.	3 June 2025	Almaty Central Stadium, Almaty, Kazakhstan	Kazakhstan	1–1	3–1	2025 UEFA Nations League
