= Joana Lourenco Magalhães =

Luxembourgish footballer

Joana Lourenço Magalhães
Personal information
- Full name: Joana Lourenço Magalhães
- Date of birth: 4 June 2004 (age 22)
- Height: 1.69 m (5 ft 7 in)
- Position: Forward

Team information
- Current team: Bettembourg
- Number: 97

Senior career*
Years	Team	Apps	(Gls)
2018–2026	Young Boys Diekirch	132	(140)
2026–	Bettembourg	3	(1)

International career^{‡}
2021–	Luxembourg	39	(10)
- * Club domestic league appearances and goals as of 5 October 2026 ‡ National team caps and goals as of 13 October 2026

Joana Lourenço Magalhães (born 4 June 2004) is a Luxembourgish footballer who plays as a forward for Dames Ligue 1 club Bettembourg and the Luxembourg women's national team.

== International career ==
Joana Lourenco Magalhães made her senior debut for Luxembourg on 12 June 2021 during a 0–1 friendly loss against Belgium.

== Personal life ==
Joana has a twin sister, Mariana, who plays alongside her at club level, and also has been capped by Luxembourg.

== Career statistics ==
#	Date	Venue	Opponent	Score	Result	Competition
1.	16 February 2022	Stade François Trausch, Mamer, Luxembourg	Tahiti	4–0	5–0	Friendly
2.	19 February 2022	Stade Molsheim, Molsheim, France	Tahiti	1–0	11–0	Friendly
3.	19 February 2022	Stade Molsheim, Molsheim, France	Tahiti	3–0	11–0	Friendly
4.	19 February 2022	Stade Molsheim, Molsheim, France	Tahiti	4–0	11–0	Friendly
5.	19 February 2022	Stade Molsheim, Molsheim, France	Tahiti	8–0	11–0	Friendly
6.	19 February 2022	Stade Molsheim, Molsheim, France	Tahiti	9–0	11–0	Friendly
7.	9 April 2022	Stade Municipal, Bettembourg, Luxembourg	Latvia	1–2	3–2	2023 World Cup qualifying
8.	26 September 2023	Stade Émile Mayrisch, Esch-sur-Alzette, Luxembourg	Georgia	1–1	1–1	2023–24 UEFA Women's Nations League
9.	5 December 2023	Stade Municipal de la Ville de Differdange, Differdange, Luxembourg	Lithuania	1–0	1–1	2023–24 UEFA Women's Nations League
10.	30 May 2025	Stade rue Henri Dunant, Beggen, Luxembourg	Armenia	2–0	2–0	2025 UEFA Women's Nations League
