= Amy Thompson =

Luxembourgish footballer

Personal information
- Full name: Amy Lan Thompson
- Date of birth: 28 July 1994 (age 32)
- Place of birth: Luxembourg City, Luxembourg
- Height: 1.57 m (5 ft 2 in)
- Position: Midfielder

Team information
- Current team: Differdange
- Number: 19

College career
Years	Team	Apps	(Gls)
2016	Stony Brook Seawolves	12	(5)

Senior career*
Years	Team	Apps	(Gls)
2011–2012	Progrès		
2012–2013	SV Bardenbach	7	(1)
2013–2015	1. FC Saarbrücken	42	(8)
2017–2021	Progrès	2	(0)
2021–2024	Mamer 32	59	(116)
2024–2025	Swift Hesperange	18	(19)
2025–	Differdange	11	(7)

International career^{‡}
2011–2026	Luxembourg	56	(35)
- * Club domestic league appearances and goals as of 8 June 2026 ‡ National team caps and goals as of 10 June 2026

Amy Lan Thompson (born 28 July 1994) is a Luxembourgish international footballer who plays as a forward for Differdange and formerly the Luxembourg national team.

Thompson returned to the national team in 2022 after a four-year absence. She is Luxembourg's all-time top goalscorer, with 35 goals in 56 appearances.

She played her last international match on 9 June 2026 against Belgium.

== International goals ==
#	Date	Venue	Opponent	Score	Result	Competition
1.	8 March 2011	Stadion Mladost, Strumica, North Macedonia	Lithuania	1–3	1–4	UEFA Women's Euro 2013 qualifying
2.	20 April 2011	Marston Stadium, Port Talbot, Wales	Wales	1–1	1–5	Friendly
3.	20 March 2013	Stade An de Burwiesen, Mertzig, Luxembourg	Estonia	1–1	1–1	Friendly
4.	11 December 2014	Makario Stadium, Nicosia, Cyprus	Cyprus	1–2	2–3	Friendly
5.	4 April 2015	CSR Orhei, Orhei, Moldova	Latvia	3–2	4–3	UEFA Women's Euro 2017 qualifying
6.	4 April 2015	CSR Orhei, Orhei, Moldova	Latvia	4–3	4–3	UEFA Women's Euro 2017 qualifying
7.	26 June 2016	Stade Bloen Eck, Stegen, Luxembourg	United Arab Emirates	4–0	6–0	Friendly
8.	29 June 2016	Stade Am Ga, Wormeldange, Luxembourg	United Arab Emirates	1–0	5–2	Friendly
9.	29 June 2016	Stade Am Ga, Wormeldange, Luxembourg	United Arab Emirates	3–0	5–2	Friendly
10.	29 June 2016	Stade Am Ga, Wormeldange, Luxembourg	United Arab Emirates	5–0	5–2	Friendly
11.	23 November 2018	Jalan Besar Stadium, Singapore	Indonesia	1–0	1–0	FIFA Mini-Tournament
12.	16 February 2022	Stade François Trausch, Mamer, Luxembourg	Tahiti	5–0	5–0	Friendly
13.	19 February 2022	Stade Molsheim, Molsheim, France	Tahiti	2–0	11–0	Friendly
14.	9 April 2022	Stade Municipal, Bettembourg, Luxembourg	Latvia	2–2	3–2	2023 World Cup qualifying
15.	9 April 2022	Stade Municipal, Bettembourg, Luxembourg	Latvia	3–2	3–2	2023 World Cup qualifying
16.	12 April 2022	Stade Émile Mayrisch, Esch-sur-Alzette, Luxembourg	North Macedonia	1–1	2–1	2023 World Cup qualifying
17.	12 April 2022	Stade Émile Mayrisch, Esch-sur-Alzette, Luxembourg	North Macedonia	2–1	2–1	2023 World Cup qualifying
18.	2 September 2022	Stade Émile Mayrisch, Esch-sur-Alzette, Luxembourg	Northern Ireland	1–1	1–2	2023 World Cup qualifying
19.	13 November 2022	Stade Municipal, Rumelange, Rumelange, Luxembourg	Lithuania	1–2	2–3	Friendly
20.	20 February 2023	Centenary Stadium, Ta' Qali, Malta	Malta	1–2	1–3	Friendly
21.	5 April 2023	Stade Achille Hammerel, Luxembourg City, Luxembourg	Faroe Islands	2–1	5–5	Friendly
22.	5 April 2023	Stade Achille Hammerel, Luxembourg City, Luxembourg	Faroe Islands	4–5	5–5	Friendly
23.	5 April 2023	Stade Achille Hammerel, Luxembourg City, Luxembourg	Faroe Islands	5–5	5–5	Friendly
24.	8 April 2023	Stade Georges Wohlfart, Parc Hosingen, Luxembourg	Faroe Islands	1–1	2–1	Friendly
25.	22 September 2023	Central Stadium of Jonava, Jonava, Lithuania	Lithuania	1–0	2–0	2023–24 UEFA Women's Nations League
26.	1 December 2023	Mikheil Meskhi Stadium, Tbilisi, Georgia	Georgia	2–0	2–4	2023–24 UEFA Women's Nations League
27.	5 April 2024	Stade Emile Mayrisch, Esch-sur-Alzette, Luxembourg	Albania	2–1	2–1	UEFA Women's Euro 2025 qualifying
28.	16 July 2024	Tamme Stadium, Tartu, Estonia	Estonia	1–0	1–1	UEFA Women's Euro 2025 qualifying
29.	25 February 2025	Stade Emile Mayrisch, Esch-sur-Alzette, Luxembourg	Liechtenstein	3–0	7–0	2025 UEFA Nations League
30.	4 April 2025	Yerevan Football Academy Stadium, Yerevan, Armenia	Armenia	1–0	3–1	2025 UEFA Nations League
31.	4 April 2025	Yerevan Football Academy Stadium, Yerevan, Armenia	Armenia	3–1	3–1	2025 UEFA Nations League
32.	8 April 2025	Sportpark Eschen-Mauren, Eschen, Liechtenstein	Liechtenstein	1–0	3–2	2025 UEFA Nations League
33.	8 April 2025	Sportpark Eschen-Mauren, Eschen, Liechtenstein	Liechtenstein	2–0	3–2	2025 UEFA Nations League
34.	30 May 2025	Stade rue Henri Dunant, Beggen, Luxembourg	Armenia	1–0	2–0	2025 UEFA Nations League
35.	28 November 2025	Dasaki Stadium, Achnas, Cyprus	Cyprus	1–1	2–3	Friendly

== Honours ==
Progrès Niederkorn

- Dames Ligue 1 runner-up: 2011–12
- Luxembourg Women's Cup runner-up: 2011–12

== See also ==
- List of top international women's football goalscorers by country
