= Mariana Lourenco Magalhães =

Luxembourgish footballer

Mariana Lourenço Magalhães
Personal information
- Full name: Mariana Lourenço Magalhães
- Date of birth: 4 June 2004 (age 22)
- Height: 1.68 m (5 ft 6 in)
- Position: Defender

Team information
- Current team: Young Boys Diekirch
- Number: 28

Senior career*
Years	Team	Apps	(Gls)
2018–	Young Boys Diekirch	137	(8)

International career^{‡}
2021–	Luxembourg	7	(0)
- * Club domestic league appearances and goals as of 8 June 2026 ‡ National team caps and goals as of 21 April 2023

Mariana Lourenço Magalhães (born 4 June 2004) is a Luxembourgish footballer who plays as a defender for Dames Ligue 1 club Young Boys Diekirch and the Luxembourg women's national team.

== International career ==
Lourenco Magalhães made her senior debut for Luxembourg on 22 October 2021 during a 0–5 2023 World Cup qualifying loss against Austria.

== Personal life ==
Mariana has a twin sister, Joana, who plays alongside her at club level, and also has been capped by Luxembourg.
