= Kim Olafsson =

Luxembourgish footballer

Personal information
- Full name: Kim Olafsson Gunnlaugsson
- Date of birth: 27 August 1998 (age 28)
- Place of birth: Luxembourg
- Height: 1.76 m (5 ft 9 in)
- Position: Forward

Youth career
- 2014–2015: Frankfurt

Senior career*
Years	Team	Apps	(Gls)
2015–2019	1. FFC Frankfurt II	27	(1)
2020-2021	Frankfurt	-	(-)
2021–2022	Elversberg	2	(0)
2022–2023	Racing	0	(0)

International career^{‡}
2015	Iceland U17	3	(0)
2015–2016	Iceland U19	4	(0)
2014–2022	Luxembourg	5	(1)
- * Club domestic league appearances and goals as of 31 May 2024 ‡ National team caps and goals as of 24 June 2022

Kim Olafsson Gunnlaugsson (born 27 August 1998) is a retired Luxembourgish footballer who played as a forward and was capped by the Luxembourg women's national team.

As of June 2026 Olafsson is the women's national team's fitness coach for Luxembourg.

== Early life ==
Olafsson was born in Luxembourg to an Icelandic father and a Luxembourgish mother. Kim moved with only 15 years to Frankfurt, Germany to pursue her football career. After two successful years she got a knee injury. 2017 first ACL tear, 2018 and 2019 inside meniscus tear(all left Knee).

== Club career ==
Olafsson has played for FFC Frankfurt II 2. Bundesliga in Germany.

== International career ==
Olafsson made her senior debut for Luxembourg on 29 October 2014 as a 79th-minute substitution in a 1–0 friendly home win over Lithuania. She scored her first international goal on 11 December 2014 in a 2–3 friendly away loss to Cyprus. After these two friendly appearances for Luxembourg, she agreed to officially play for Iceland at youth levels. She represented Iceland at the 2015 UEFA Women's Under-17 Championship and two UEFA Women's Under-19 Championship qualifications (2016 and 2017). On 11 April 2021, she resumed her senior international career with Luxembourg, appearing in a 2–1 friendly away win over Liechtenstein.

=== International goals ===
#	Date	Venue	Opponent	Score	Result	Competition
1.	11 December 2014	Makario Stadium, Nicosia, Cyprus	Cyprus	2–3	2–3	Friendly
