= Jill De Bruyn =

Luxembourgish footballer

Personal information
- Date of birth: 13 December 1993 (age 32)
- Position: Midfielder

Team information
- Current team: Munsbach

Senior career*
Years	Team	Apps	(Gls)
2015–2021	Ell	51	(59)
2021–2022	Munsbach	10	(8)

International career^{‡}
2018–2022	Luxembourg	14	(0)
- * Club domestic league appearances and goals as of 10 June 2023 ‡ National team caps and goals as of 29 June 2022

Jill De Bruyn (born 13 December 1993) is a retired Luxembourger footballer who played as a midfielder for Dames Ligue 1 club Munsbach and the Luxembourg women's national team.

== International career ==
De Bruyn made her senior debut for Luxembourg on 3 March 2018 during a 1–7 friendly loss to Morocco.

She announced her retirement from international football following a 6-1 friendly loss against Belgium on 28 June 2022.
