= Ulza Maksuti =

Macedonian footballe (born 1999)

Personal information
- Date of birth: 8 July 1999 (age 27)
- Place of birth: Republic of Macedonia
- Position: Forward

Team information
- Current team: Ünye Kadın
- Number: 10

Senior career*
Years	Team	Apps	(Gls)
- ŽFK Istatov
- ŽFK AS United
2025–	Ünye Kadın	12	(5)

International career
2021–	North Macedonia	25	(2)
- * Club domestic league appearances and goals as of 4 May 2025

Ulza Maksuti (Macedonian: Улза Максути, born 8 July 1999) is a Macedonian women's football forward who plays for Ünye Kadın in the Turkish Super League.

== Clıb career ==
Maksuti plays as a forward in the right wing position.

She played for ŽFK Istatov and ŽFK AS United in her country, and was named top goalscorer.

In January 2025, she moved to Turkey making her first foreign country career experience, and joined Ünye Kadın in Giresun to play in the second half of the 2024–25 Super League season.

== International career ==
Maksuti has played in all age categories of the North Macedonian national teams before she was admitted to the North Macedonia national team.

She scored one goal against Bulgaria at the 2023–24 UEFA Women's Nations League C on 5 December 2023. She netted her team's only goal against Latvia at the 2025 UEFA Women's Nations League C on 4 April 2025.

== International goals ==
No.	Date	Venue	Opponent	Score	Result	Competition
1.	8 April 2021	Petar Miloševski Training Centre, Skopje, North Macedonia	Kosovo	1–2	1–3	Friendly
2.	21 October 2021	Daugava Stadium, Riga, Latvia	Latvia	3–1	4–1	2023 FIFA Women's World Cup qualification
3.	10 April 2023	Camp FSCG, Podgorica, Montenegro	Montenegro	1–1	1–3	Friendly
4.	5 December 2023	Vasil Levski National Stadium, Sofia, Bulgaria	Bulgaria	2–0	2–2	2023–24 UEFA Women's Nations League
5.	31 May 2024	Petar Miloševski Training Centre, Skopje, North Macedonia	Moldova	1–0	1–1	UEFA Women's Euro 2025 qualifying
6.	25 October 2024	Stadion Septemvri, Razlog, Bulgaria	Moldova	1–0	1–0	Friendly
7.	30 November 2024	Petar Miloševski Training Centre, Skopje, North Macedonia	Montenegro	3–1	3–2	Friendly
8.	3 December 2024	Petar Miloševski Training Centre, Skopje, North Macedonia	Montenegro	1–2	1–5	Friendly
9.	4 April 2025	Petar Miloševski Training Centre, Skopje, North Macedonia	Latvia	1–1	1–2	2025 UEFA Women's Nations League
