= Yoana Stankova =

Bulgarian footballer (born 2005)

Personal information
- Full name: Yoana Yordanova Stankova
- Date of birth: 20 August 2005 (age 21)
- Place of birth: Bulgaria
- Positions: Defender; midfielder

Team information
- Current team: FC Lumezzane (on loan from Como 1907)
- Number: 19

Youth career
- –2022: Lokomotiv Stara Zagora
- 2022–2024: Sassuolo

Senior career*
Years	Team	Apps	(Gls)
2024–2025	Freedom FC Women	17	(1)
2025–2026	FC Lumezzane	1	(1)
2026–	Como 1907	0	(0)
2026–	→ FC Lumezzane (loan)	1	(0)

International career
2021–2024	Bulgaria U17	3	(0)
2022–2025	Bulgaria U19	11	(0)
2021–	Bulgaria	24	(1)
- * Club domestic league appearances and goals

Yoana Yordanova Stankova (Bulgarian: Йоана Станкова; born 20 August 2005) is a Bulgarian footballer who plays as a defender or midfielder for Sassuolo.

== Early life ==
Stankova was born in 2005 in Bulgaria. She is a native of Burgas, Bulgaria.

== Education ==
Stankova attended Georgi Sava Rakovski School for Romance Languages in Bulgaria. She graduated in 2024.

== Career ==
Stankova is a Bulgaria international. She scored the first goal of the UEFA Women's Nations League.

== International goals ==
No.	Date	Venue	Opponent	Score	Result	Competition
1.	22 September 2023	Petar Miloševski Training Centre, Skopje, North Macedonia	North Macedonia	1–0	1–0	2023–24 UEFA Women's Nations League

== Style of play ==
Stankova mainly operates as a defender. She can also operate as a midfielder.

== Personal life ==
Stankova has been a supporter of Spanish La Liga side Barcelona. She has regarded Argentina international Lionel Messi as her football idol.
