= Mana Mollayeva =

Azerbaijani footballer (born 1998)

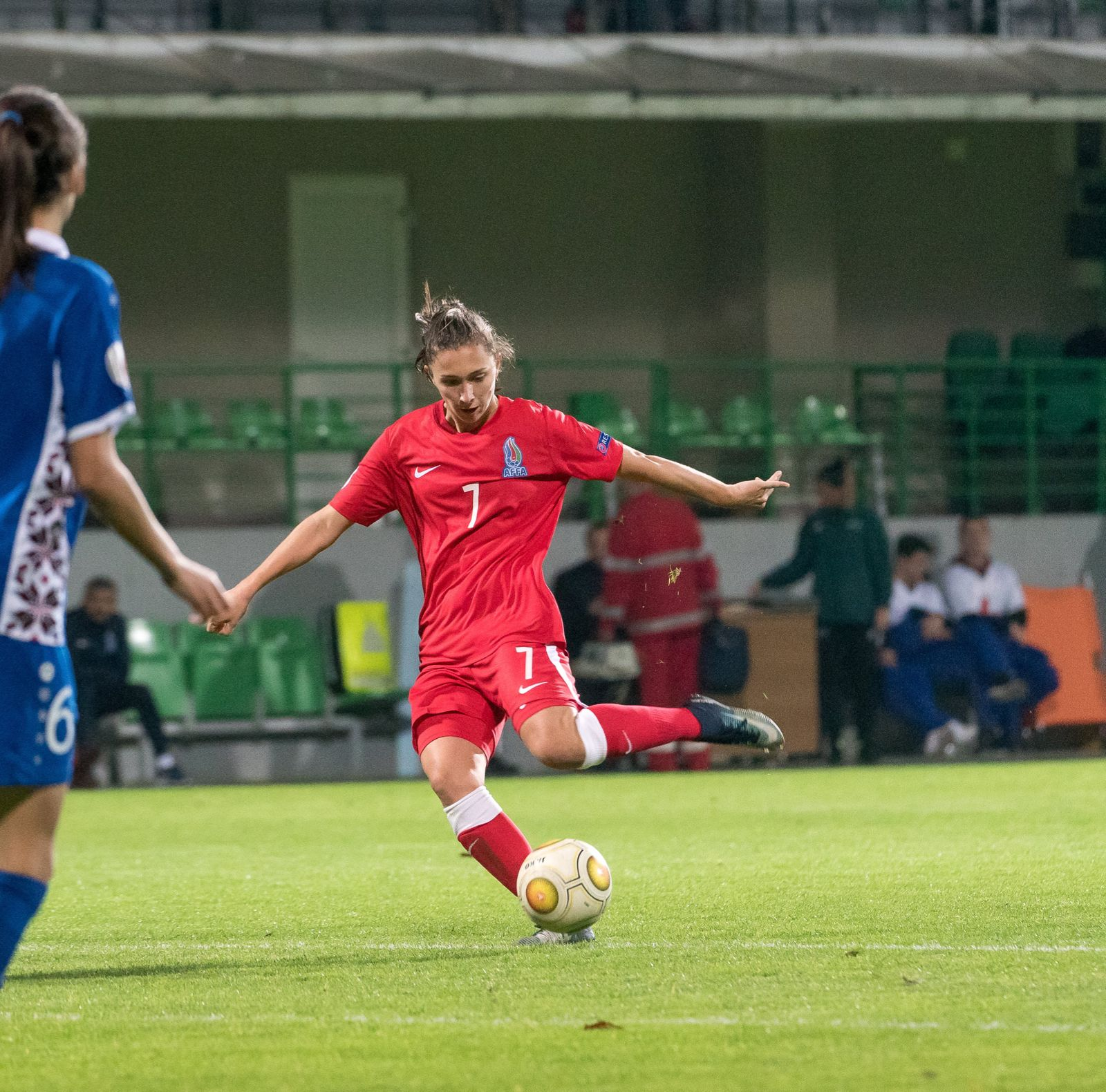

Personal information
- Date of birth: 19 March 1998 (age 28)
- Height: 1.79 m (5 ft 10 in)
- Position: Defender

Senior career*
Years	Team	Apps	(Gls)
2017–2018	Kubanochka	19	(0)
2019-	Ryazan	10	(2)

International career^{‡}
2013–2014	Azerbaijan U17	6	(0)
2015–2016	Azerbaijan U19	7	(1)
2019–	Azerbaijan	23	(0)
- * Club domestic league appearances and goals as of 23 November 2019 ‡ National team caps and goals as of 10 November 2019

Mana Mollayeva (Azerbaijani: Manə Mollayeva; born 19 March 1998) is an Azerbaijani footballer who plays as a defender for the Azerbaijan women's national team.

== International goals ==
No.	Date	Venue	Opponent	Score	Result	Competition
1.	23 February 2022	Dalga Arena, Baku, Azerbaijan	United Arab Emirates	2–0	2–0	Friendly
2.	27 October 2023	Við Djúpumýrar, Klaksvík, Faroe Islands	Faroe Islands	2–0	2–1	2023–24 UEFA Women's Nations League
3.	31 October 2023	Dalga Arena, Baku, Azerbaijan	Montenegro	1–0	3–0	2023–24 UEFA Women's Nations League
4.	8 April 2025	Gradski stadion, Nikšić, Montenegro	Montenegro	1–0	1–1	2025 UEFA Women's Nations League
5.	9 June 2026	Petar Miloševski Football Stadium, Bitola, North Macedonia	North Macedonia	2–1	3–1	2027 FIFA Women's World Cup qualification

== See also ==
- List of Azerbaijan women's international footballers
