= Marisa Soares Marques =

Luxembourgish footballer

Personal information
- Date of birth: 13 August 1993 (age 33)
- Position: Midfielder

Team information
- Current team: Differdange
- Number: 10

Senior career*
Years	Team	Apps	(Gls)
2018–2022	Mamer	46	(7)
2022–	Differdange	50	(4)

International career^{‡}
2018–	Luxembourg	30	(0)
- * Club domestic league appearances and goals as of 8 June 2026 ‡ National team caps and goals as of 12 July 2024

Marisa Soares Marques (born 13 August 1993) is a Luxembourgish footballer who plays as a midfielder for Dames Ligue 1 club Differdange and the Luxembourg women's national team.

== International career ==
Soares Marques made her senior debut for Luxembourg on 10 November 2018 during a 2–0 friendly win against Andorra.
