= Emma Goetz =

Luxembourgish footballer (born 2006)

Personal information
- Date of birth: 6 January 2006 (age 20)
- Position: Goalkeeper

Team information
- Current team: FK Austria Wien
- Number: 12

Senior career*
Years	Team	Apps	(Gls)
2021–2022	AS Wincrange	9	(0)
2022–2025	Freiburg II	7	(0)
2025–	FK Austria Wien	2	(0)

International career^{‡}
2022–	Luxembourg	3	(0)
- * Club domestic league appearances and goals as of 8 June 2026 ‡ National team caps and goals as of 13 October 2026

Emma Goetz (born 6 January 2006) is a Luxembourgish footballer who plays as a goalkeeper for ÖFB Frauen Bundesliga club FK Austria Wien and the Luxembourg women's national team.

== International career ==
Goetz made her senior debut for Luxembourg on 16 February 2022 during a 5–0 friendly win against Tahiti.

== Honours ==
- ÖFB Frauen-Bundesliga 2025/26
- ÖFB Frauen Cup 2025/26
