= Marta Estévez García =

Luxembourgish footballer

Personal information
- Date of birth: 5 June 1997 (age 29)
- Position: Midfielder

Team information
- Current team: Racing FC Union Luxembourg
- Number: 6

Senior career*
Years	Team	Apps	(Gls)
2011–2022	Entente WMG	44	(46)
2022–2024	Racing	21	(22)
2024–2025	PAOK	19	(0)
2025–	Racing	22	(12)

International career^{‡}
2016–	Luxembourg	59	(7)
- * Club domestic league appearances and goals as of 8 June 2026 ‡ National team caps and goals as of 13 October 2026

Marta Estévez García (born 5 June 1997) is a footballer who plays as a midfielder for Racing-Union in the Dames Ligue 1. She plays for the Luxembourg women's national team.

== Career ==
Estévez García has been capped for the Luxembourg national team, appearing for the team during the 2019 FIFA Women's World Cup qualifying cycle.

In 2026, she surpassed Amy Thompson as Luxembourg's all-time appearance leader.

=== International goals ===
#	Date	Venue	Opponent	Score	Result	Competition
1.	11 April 2021	Sportpark Eschen-Mauren, Eschen, Liechtenstein	Liechtenstein	1–1	2–1	Friendly
2.	16 February 2022	Stade François Trausch, Mamer, Luxembourg	Tahiti	1–0	5–0	Friendly
3.	17 February 2023	Centenary Stadium, Ta' Qali, Malta	Malta	1–0	1–2	Friendly
4.	5 April 2023	Stade Achille Hammerel, Luxembourg City, Luxembourg	Faroe Islands	3–5	5–5	Friendly
5.	22 September 2023	Central Stadium of Jonava, Jonava, Lithuania	Lithuania	2–0	2–0	2023–24 UEFA Women's Nations League
6.	21 February 2025	Stade Emile Mayrisch, Esch-sur-Alzette, Luxembourg	Kazakhstan	1–2	2–2	2025 UEFA Nations League
7.	25 February 2025	Stade Emile Mayrisch, Esch-sur-Alzette, Luxembourg	Liechtenstein	4–0	7–0	2025 UEFA Nations League

== Personal life ==
Estévez attended the European School of Luxembourg in the Spanish section. She graduated and obtained her European Baccalaureate in 2015. After turning 16, Estévez obtained Luxembourgish citizenship, thus making her a double national. In addition to her native Spanish, she speaks English, French, German and Luxembourgish.

== Honours ==
Racing

- Ligue 1 (2): 2022/23, 2023/24
- Luxembourg Cup (2): 2022/23, 2023/24
