= Sharon Beck =

Israeli footballer (born 1995)

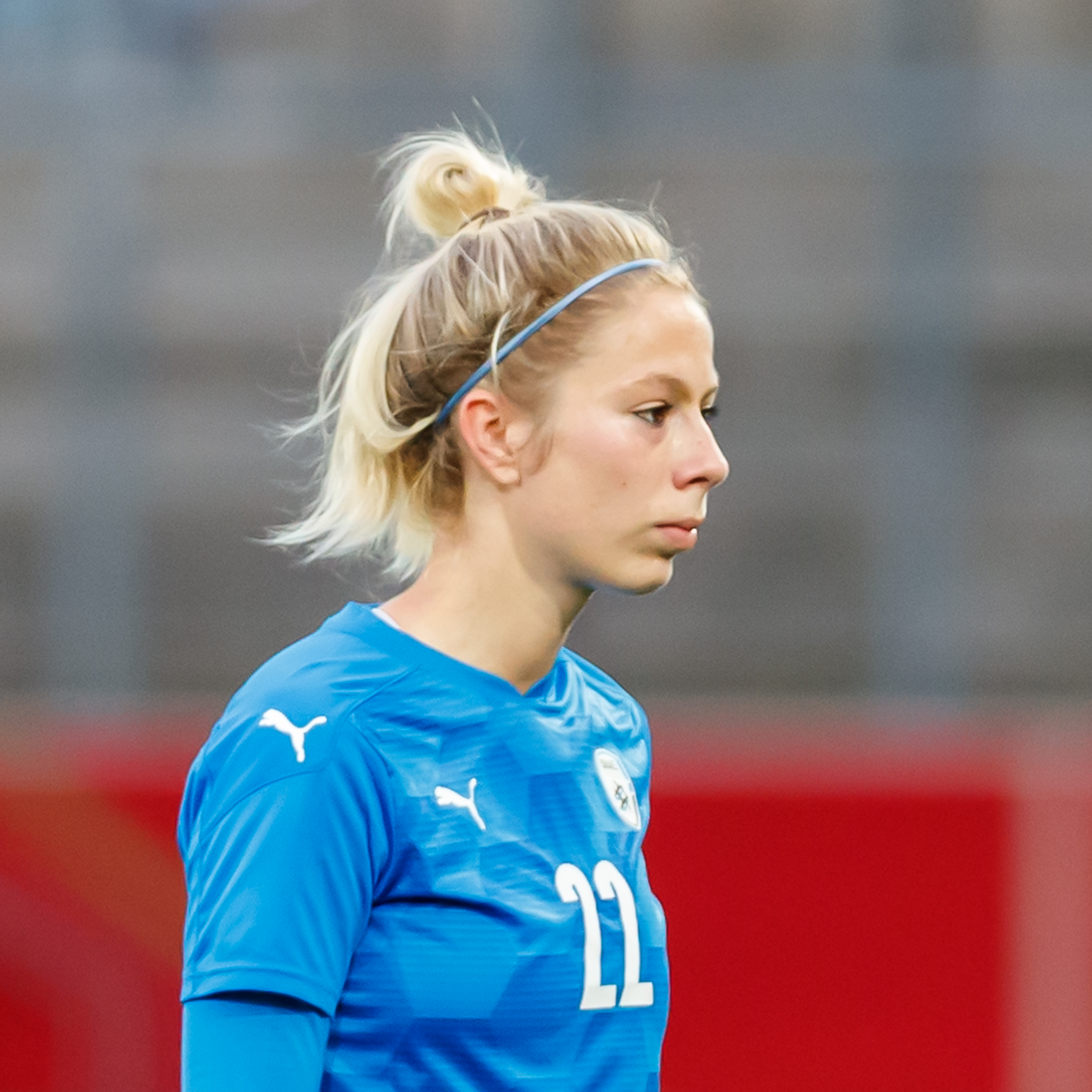
- Beck playing for Israel in 2021

Personal information
- Full name: Sharon Maria Rebecca Beck
- Date of birth: 22 March 1995 (age 31)
- Place of birth: Tönisvorst, Germany
- Height: 1.80 m (5 ft 11 in)
- Position: Midfielder

Youth career
- –2011: FCR 2001 Duisburg
- 2011–2012: SGS Essen

Senior career*
Years	Team	Apps	(Gls)
2011–2013	SGS Essen	7	(0)
2013–2016	Bayer Leverkusen	32	(18)
2016–2018	1899 Hoffenheim	28	(2)
2016–2017	→ 1899 Hoffenheim II	1	(1)
2018–2020	SC Freiburg	30	(6)
2020–2024	1. FC Köln	65	(16)
2024–2026	Werder Bremen	12	(0)

International career^{‡}
2012	Germany U17		
2018	Germany	0	(0)
2018–	Israel	24	(10)
- * Club domestic league appearances and goals as of 5 July 2026 ‡ National team caps and goals as of 1 March 2026

Sharon Maria Rebecca Beck (Hebrew: שרון מריה רבקה בק; born 22 March 1995) is a footballer who plays as a midfielder. Born in Germany, she plays for the Israel women's national team. She is the top scorer of the 2023–24 UEFA Women's Nations League.

== Early life ==
Beck was born in Tönisvorst, Germany, to a father of Israeli Jewish heritage and a German mother. She grew up in Germany.

== Club career ==
In April 2024, it was announced Beck would join 1. FC Köln's Frauen-Bundesliga rivals Werder Bremen in the summer, ahead of the 2024–25 season.

== International career ==
=== Germany ===
Beck was first called up to the Germany national team for the 2018 SheBelieves Cup. She remained on the bench for all three matches. After a few weeks with the national team she made the decision to pursue her international career with Israel instead, saying "Israel is a small country and I know I will never experience sporting success with them like with Germany. But I'm not a person who just cares about titles or status. I do what feels good to me."

=== Israel ===
Beck has been capped for the Israel national team, and has represented Germany on U16 and U17 levels. On 7 November 2019, she scored her first international goal for Israel against Malta in 1–1 draw at UEFA Women's Euro 2022 qualifying.

Beck scored nine goals in four games during the 2023–24 UEFA Women's Nations League, becoming the competition's top goalscorer in the inaugural campaign.

== Career statistics ==
Scores and results list Israel's goal tally first, score column indicates score after each Beck goal.

List of international goals scored by Sharon Beck
No.	Date	Venue	Opponent	Score	Result	Competition
1	7 November 2019	Centenary Stadium, Ta'Qali, Malta	Malta	1–1	1–1	UEFA Women's Euro 2022 qualifying
2	26 September 2023	Tamme Stadium, Tartu, Estonia	Estonia	5–0	5–0	2023–24 UEFA Women's Nations League
3	29 November 2023	Armavir City Stadium, Armavir, Armenia	Armenia	2–0	4–0	2023–24 UEFA Women's Nations League
4	29 November 2023	Armavir City Stadium, Armavir, Armenia	Armenia	3–0	4–0	2023–24 UEFA Women's Nations League
5	29 November 2023	Armavir City Stadium, Armavir, Armenia	Armenia	4–0	4–0	2023–24 UEFA Women's Nations League
6	2 December 2023	Vazgen Sargsyan Republican Stadium, Yerevan, Armenia	Armenia	3–0	6–1	2023–24 UEFA Women's Nations League
7	2 December 2023	Vazgen Sargsyan Republican Stadium, Yerevan, Armenia	Armenia	5–1	6–1	2023–24 UEFA Women's Nations League
8	5 December 2023	Globall Football Park, Telki, Hungary	Estonia	1–0	4–1	2023–24 UEFA Women's Nations League
9	5 December 2023	Globall Football Park, Telki, Hungary	Estonia	3–0	4–1	2023–24 UEFA Women's Nations League
10	5 December 2023	Globall Football Park, Telki, Hungary	Estonia	4–0	4–1	2023–24 UEFA Women's Nations League
