= Jessica Birkel =

Luxembourgish international footballer

Personal information
- Full name: Jessica Birkel
- Date of birth: 29 January 1988 (age 38)
- Place of birth: Luxembourg
- Position: Striker

International career^{‡}
Years	Team	Apps	(Gls)
2006–2018	Luxembourg	40	(7)
- ‡ National team caps and goals as of 14 April 2021

Jessica Birkel (born 29 January 1988) is a former Luxembourgish international footballer who played as a striker and was formerly Luxembourg's most-capped women's player.
