= Isabel Albert =

Luxembourgish footballer

Personal information
- Date of birth: 10 May 1995 (age 31)
- Position: Forward

Team information
- Current team: Swift Hesperange
- Number: 21

Senior career*
Years	Team	Apps	(Gls)
2018–2022	WMG	35	(28)
2022–2023	Bettembourg	19	(15)
2023–2025	WMG	39	(5)
2025–	Swift Hesperange	4	(0)

International career^{‡}
2020–	Luxembourg	28	(1)
- * Club domestic league appearances and goals as of 8 June 2026 ‡ National team caps and goals as of 8 April 2025

Isabel Albert (born 10 May 1995) is a Luxembourgish footballer who plays as a forward for Dames Ligue 1 club Swift Hesperange and the Luxembourg women's national team.

== International career ==
Albert made her senior debut for Luxembourg on 20 September 2020 during a 0–3 friendly loss against Bulgaria.

== Career statistics ==
No.	Date	Venue	Opponent	Score	Result	Competition
1.	5 April 2023	Stade Achille Hammerel, Luxembourg City, Luxembourg	Faroe Islands	1–1	5–5	Friendly
