= Charlotte Schmit =

Luxembourgish footballer (born 2006)

Personal information
- Date of birth: 17 January 2006 (age 20)
- Place of birth: Luxembourg
- Position: Midfielder

Team information
- Current team: Valadares Gaia

Senior career*
| Years | Team | Apps | (Gls) |
| 2020–2022 | Munsbach | 29 | (30) |
| 2022–2025 | Freiburg II | 61 | (5) |
| 2025–2026 | Sporting CP B | 19 | (6) |
| 2025–2026 | Sporting CP | 0 | (0) |
| 2026– | Valadares Gaia | 1 | (0) |

International career^{‡}
| 2021– | Luxembourg | 36 | (3) |
- * Club domestic league appearances and goals as of 5 October 2026 ‡ National team caps and goals as of 13 October 2026

Charlotte Schmit (born 17 January 2006) is a Luxembourgish footballer who plays as a midfielder for Campeonato Nacional Feminino club Valadares Gaia and the Luxembourg women's national team.

== International career ==
Schmit made her senior debut for Luxembourg on 11 April 2021 during a 2–1 friendly win against Liechtenstein.

== Career statistics ==
| # | Date | Venue | Opponent | Score | Result | Competition |
|---|---|---|---|---|---|---|
| 1. | 5 April 2024 | Stade Emile Mayrisch, Esch-sur-Alzette, Luxembourg | Albania | 1–1 | 2–1 | UEFA Women's Euro 2025 qualifying |
| 2. | 25 February 2025 | Stade Emile Mayrisch, Esch-sur-Alzette, Luxembourg | Liechtenstein | 7–0 | 7–0 | 2025 UEFA Nations League |
| 3. | 4 April 2025 | Yerevan Football Academy Stadium, Yerevan, Armenia | Armenia | 2–0 | 3–1 | 2025 UEFA Nations League |
