= Catarina Lavinas =

Luxembourgish footballer (born 2002)

Personal information
- Full name: Catarina Teixeira Lavinas
- Date of birth: 28 September 2002 (age 24)
- Place of birth: Luxembourg
- Height: 1.57 m (5 ft 2 in)
- Position: Midfielder

Team information
- Current team: Ouriense
- Number: 11

Senior career*
Years	Team	Apps	(Gls)
- Racing FC Union Luxembourg
–2020	FC Progrès Niederkorn		
2020–2024	Racing FC Union Luxembourg		
2024	VfR Warbeyen	9	(1)
2025	1. FC Recklinghausen	9	(2)
2025–2026	SV Elversberg	11	(1)
2026	Famalicão	13	(0)
2026–	Ouriense	2	(0)

International career^{‡}
2019–	Luxembourg	24	(0)
- * Club domestic league appearances and goals as of 5 October 2026 ‡ National team caps and goals as of 13 October 2026

Catarina Teixeira Lavinas (born 28 September 2002) is a Luxembourgish professional footballer who plays as a midfielder for Campeonato Nacional II Divisão Feminino side Ouriense.

== Early life ==
Lavinas was born on 28 September 2002. Born in Luxembourg, she is of Portuguese descent through her parents.

== Club career ==
Lavinas started her career with Luxembourgish side Racing FC Union Luxembourg. Following her stint there, she signed for Luxembourgish side FC Progrès Niederkorn. In 2020, she returned to Luxembourgish side Racing FC Union Luxembourg, helping the club win the league title.

Subsequently, she signed for German side VfR Warbeyen, where she made nine league appearances and scored one goal. Six months later, she signed for German side 1. FC Recklinghausen, where she made nine league appearances and scored two goals. Ahead of the 2025–26 season, she signed for German side SV Elversberg.

During the winter transfer window in 2026, Lavinas signed for Famalicão in Portugal's second-tier.

== International career ==
Lavinas is a Luxembourg international. During April, June, July and October 2024, she played for the Luxembourg women's national football team for UEFA Women's Euro 2025 qualifying.

== Style of play ==
Lavinas plays as a midfielder. Luxembourgish news website Mental.lu wrote in 2021 that she is "highly technically gifted... delights with her dribbling and passing".
