= Caroline Jorge =

Luxembourgish footballer (born 2005)

Personal information
- Date of birth: 29 November 2005 (age 20)
- Position: Midfielder

Team information
- Current team: Racing
- Number: 18

Senior career*
Years	Team	Apps	(Gls)
2020–2022	Munsbach	34	(44)
2022–2025	Standard Liège	22	(1)
2025–	Racing	13	(29)

International career^{‡}
2021–	Luxembourg	32	(5)
- * Club domestic league appearances and goals as of 8 June 2026 ‡ National team caps and goals as of 9 March 2026

Caroline Jorge Magalhães (born 29 November 2005) is a Luxembourgish footballer who plays as a midfielder for Racing and the Luxembourg women's national team.

== International career ==
Jorge made her senior debut for Luxembourg on 11 April 2021 during a 2–1 friendly win against Liechtenstein.

=== International goals ===
#	Date	Venue	Opponent	Score	Result	Competition
1.	19 June 2022	Stade Municipal, Bettembourg, Luxembourg	Cape Verde	2–1	2–1	Friendly
2.	28 June 2022	Stade Herman-Vanderpoorten, Lierre, Belgium	Belgium	1–1	1–6	Friendly
3.	25 February 2025	Stade Emile Mayrisch, Esch-sur-Alzette, Luxembourg	Liechtenstein	1–0	7–0	2025 UEFA Nations League
4.	25 February 2025	Stade Emile Mayrisch, Esch-sur-Alzette, Luxembourg	Liechtenstein	2–0	7–0	2025 UEFA Nations League
5.	8 April 2025	Sportpark Eschen-Mauren, Eschen, Liechtenstein	Liechtenstein	3–2	3–2	2025 UEFA Nations League
