= Julie Marques Abreu =

Luxembourgish footballer

Personal information
- Date of birth: 6 August 2004 (age 22)
- Place of birth: Lux
- Height: 1.70 m (5 ft 7 in)
- Position: Forward

Team information
- Current team: Young Boys Diekirch
- Number: 24

Senior career*
Years	Team	Apps	(Gls)
2018–2021	AS Wincrange	16	(24)
2021–2022	Standard Liège	5	(1)
2022–2023	AS Wincrange	26	(14)
2023–	Young Boys Diekirch	45	(25)

International career^{‡}
2019–	Luxembourg	22	(6)
- * Club domestic league appearances and goals as of 8 June 2026 ‡ National team caps and goals as of 4 June 2024

Julie Marques Abreu (born 6 August 2004) is a Luxembourgish footballer who plays as a forward for Dames Ligue 1 club Young Boys Diekirch and the Luxembourg women's national team.

== International career ==
Marques Abreu made her senior debut for Luxembourg on 21 June 2019 during a 2–1 friendly win against Andorra.

=== International goals ===
#	Date	Venue	Opponent	Score	Result	Competition
1.	11 April 2021	Sportpark Eschen-Mauren, Eschen, Liechtenstein	Liechtenstein	2–1	2–1	Friendly
2.	26 October 2021	SRC Biljanini Izvori, Ohrid, North Macedonia	North Macedonia	1–0	3–2	2023 FIFA World Cup qualification
3.	26 October 2021	SRC Biljanini Izvori, Ohrid, North Macedonia	North Macedonia	2–1	3–2	2023 FIFA World Cup qualification
4.	16 February 2022	Stade François Trausch, Mamer, Luxembourg	Tahiti	3–0	5–0	Friendly
5.	19 February 2022	Stade Molsheim, Molsheim, France	Tahiti	5–0	11–0	Friendly
6.	19 February 2022	Stade Molsheim, Molsheim, France	Tahiti	10–0	11–0	Friendly
