= Lucie Schlimé =

Luxembourgish footballer

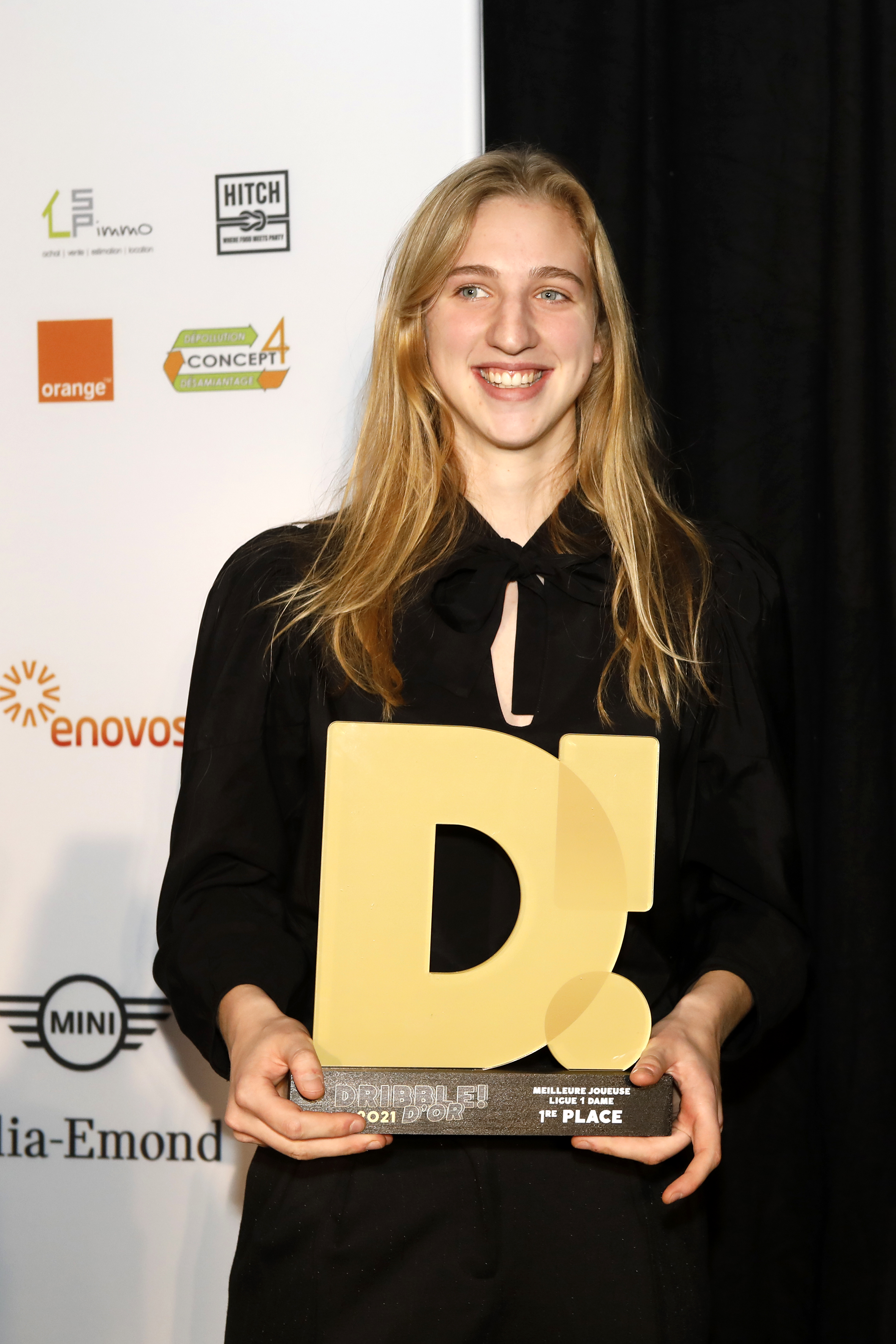
- Schlimé in 2021

Personal information
- Date of birth: 19 September 2003 (age 23)
- Place of birth: Luxembourg City
- Height: 1.80 m (5 ft 11 in)
- Position: Goalkeeper

Team information
- Current team: Sand
- Number: 1

Senior career*
Years	Team	Apps	(Gls)
- Ent. Steinsel-Walfer
2018–2022	CeBra	44	(0)
2022–2023	Bettembourg	19	(0)
2023–2025	First Vienna	7	(0)
2025–	Sand	9	(0)

International career^{‡}
2019–	Luxembourg	43	(0)
- * Club domestic league appearances and goals as of 22 November 2026 ‡ National team caps and goals as of 9 October 2026

Lucie Schlimé (born 19 September 2003) is a Luxembourgish footballer who plays as a goalkeeper for 2. Frauen-Bundesliga club Sand and the Luxembourg women's national team.

== International career ==
Schlimé made her senior debut for Luxembourg on 9 November 2019 during a 0–5 friendly loss to Kosovo.
