= Emma Kremer =

Luxembourgish footballer

Personal information
- Date of birth: 28 July 2000 (age 26)
- Position: Defender

Team information
- Current team: Vorwärts Spoho 98
- Number: 16

Senior career*
Years	Team	Apps	(Gls)
2015–2024	Jeunesse Junglinster	59	(8)
2024–2025	Aachen	23	(0)
2025–	Vorwärts Spoho 98	22	(0)

International career^{‡}
2018–	Luxembourg	42	(1)
- * Club domestic league appearances and goals as of 8 June 2026 ‡ National team caps and goals as of 13 October 2026

Emma Kremer (born 28 July 2000) is a Luxembourgish footballer who plays as a defender for Frauen-Regionalliga West club Vorwärts Spoho 98 and the Luxembourg women's national team.

== International career ==
Kremer made her senior debut for Luxembourg on 3 March 2018 during a 1–7 friendly loss to Morocco.

== Career statistics ==
#	Date	Venue	Opponent	Score	Result	Competition
1.	4 June 2024	Elbasan Arena, Elbasan, Albania	Albania	1–3	1–3	UEFA Women's Euro 2025 qualifying
