= Stade rue Henri Dunant =

Football stadium in Luxembourg

Stade Rue Henri Dunant
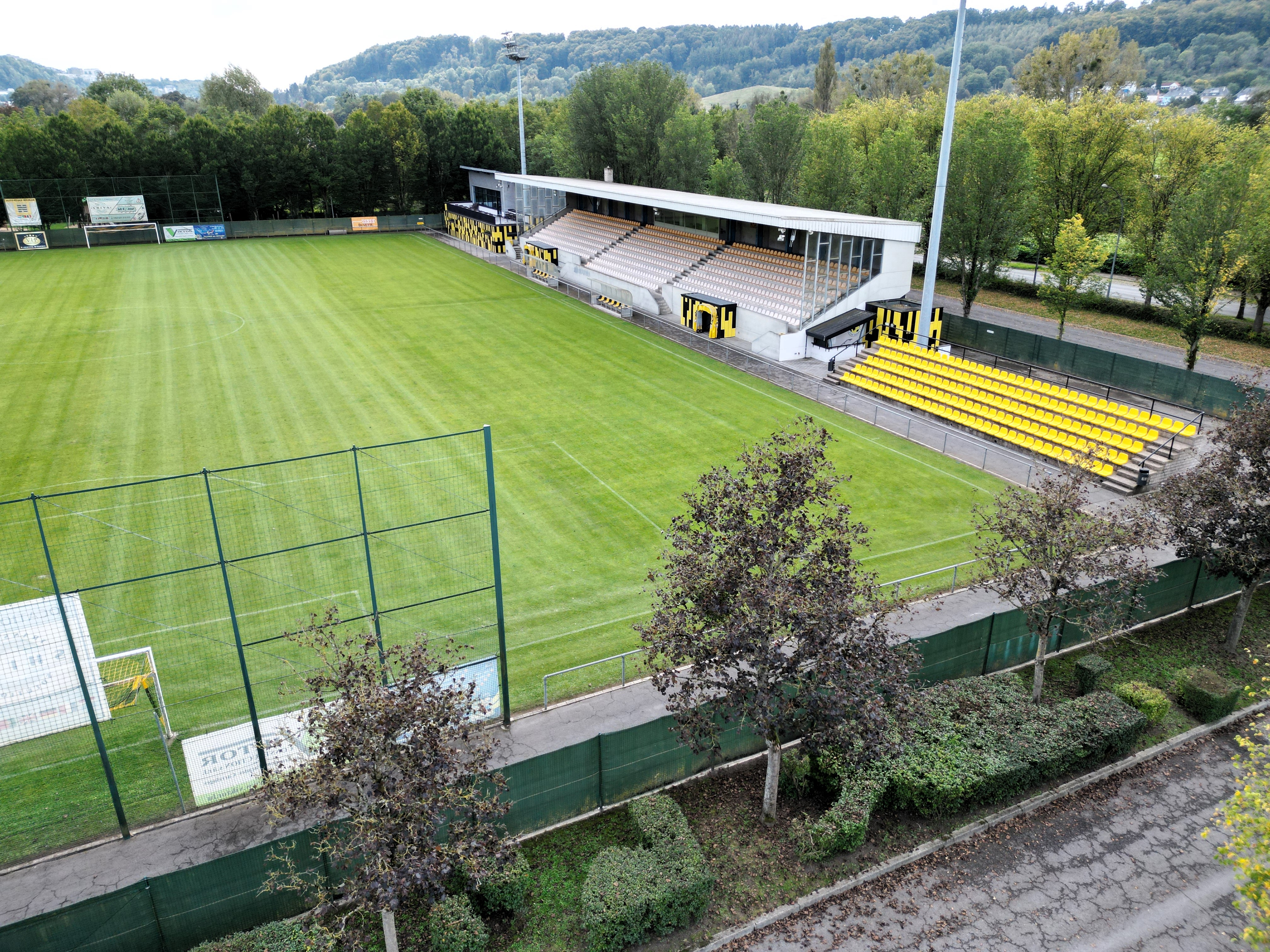
- Interactive map of Stade Rue Henri Dunant
- Full name: Stade Rue Henri Dunant
- Location: Luxembourg City, Luxembourg
- Coordinates: 49°38′47″N 06°08′07″E
- Capacity: 4,830
- Surface: grass

Tenant
- FC Avenir Beggen

Stade rue Henri Dunant is a football stadium in Beggen, a district of Luxembourg City, in northern Luxembourg. It is currently the home stadium of FC Avenir Beggen. The stadium has a capacity of 4,830.
