= Kimberley Dos Santos =

Luxembourgish footballer

Personal information
- Date of birth: 26 February 1998 (age 28)
- Position: Midfielder

Team information
- Current team: Racing
- Number: 18

Senior career*
Years	Team	Apps	(Gls)
2015–2020	Bettembourg	57	(70)
2020–2025	Racing	59	(48)
2025–2026	Saarbrücken	17	(5)
2026–	Racing	4	(3)

International career^{‡}
2016–	Luxembourg	56	(5)
- * Club domestic league appearances and goals as of 8 June 2026 ‡ National team caps and goals as of 13 October 2026

Kimberley Dos Santos (born 26 February 1998) is a Luxembourgish footballer who plays as a midfielder for Racing and the Luxembourg women's national team.

== Career ==
Dos Santos has been capped for the Luxembourg national team, appearing for the team during the 2019 FIFA Women's World Cup qualifying cycle.

=== International goals ===
#	Date	Venue	Opponent	Score	Result	Competition
1.	19 February 2022	Stade Molsheim, Molsheim, France	Tahiti	7–0	11–0	Friendly
2.	19 June 2022	Stade Municipal, Bettembourg, Luxembourg	Cape Verde	1–1	2–1	Friendly
3.	3 June 2025	Almaty Central Stadium, Almaty, Kazakhstan	Kazakhstan	2–1	3–1	2025 UEFA Women's Nations League
4.	1 December 2025	Dasaki Stadium, Achnas, Cyprus	Cyprus	3–0	3–0	Friendly
5.	18 April 2026	BSC Stadium, Budaörs, Hungary	Israel	1–0	1–3	2027 FIFA Women's World Cup qualification
