= Andreia Machado =

Luxembourgish footballer

Personal information
- Date of birth: 1 April 1995 (age 31)
- Position: Defender

Team information
- Current team: Swift Hesperange

Senior career*
Years	Team	Apps	(Gls)
2018–2021	Racing FC	7	(6)
2021–2024	Mamer 32	36	(15)
2024–	Swift Hesperange	28	(7)

International career^{‡}
2012–2026	Luxembourg	36	(3)
- * Club domestic league appearances and goals as of 8 June 2026 ‡ National team caps and goals as of 10 June 2026

Andreia Machado (born 1 April 1995) is a Luxembourgish footballer who plays as a defender for Dames Ligue 1 club Swift Hesperange and formerly the Luxembourg women's national team.

== International career ==
Machado made her senior debut for Luxembourg on 5 April 2012 during a 2–3 friendly loss against Malta.

She played her last match on 9 June 2026 against Belgium.

== International goals ==
#	Date	Venue	Opponent	Score	Result	Competition
1.	5 April 2012	Stade Um Dribbel, Bascharage, Luxembourg	Malta	2–3	2–3	Friendly
2.	26 June 2016	Stade Bloen Eck, Medernach, Luxembourg	United Arab Emirates	1–0	6–0	Friendly
3.	1 December 2023	Mikheil Meskhi Stadium, Tbilisi, Georgia	Georgia	1–0	2–4	2023–24 UEFA Women's Nations League
