= Beggen =

District of Luxembourg City, Luxembourg

- District
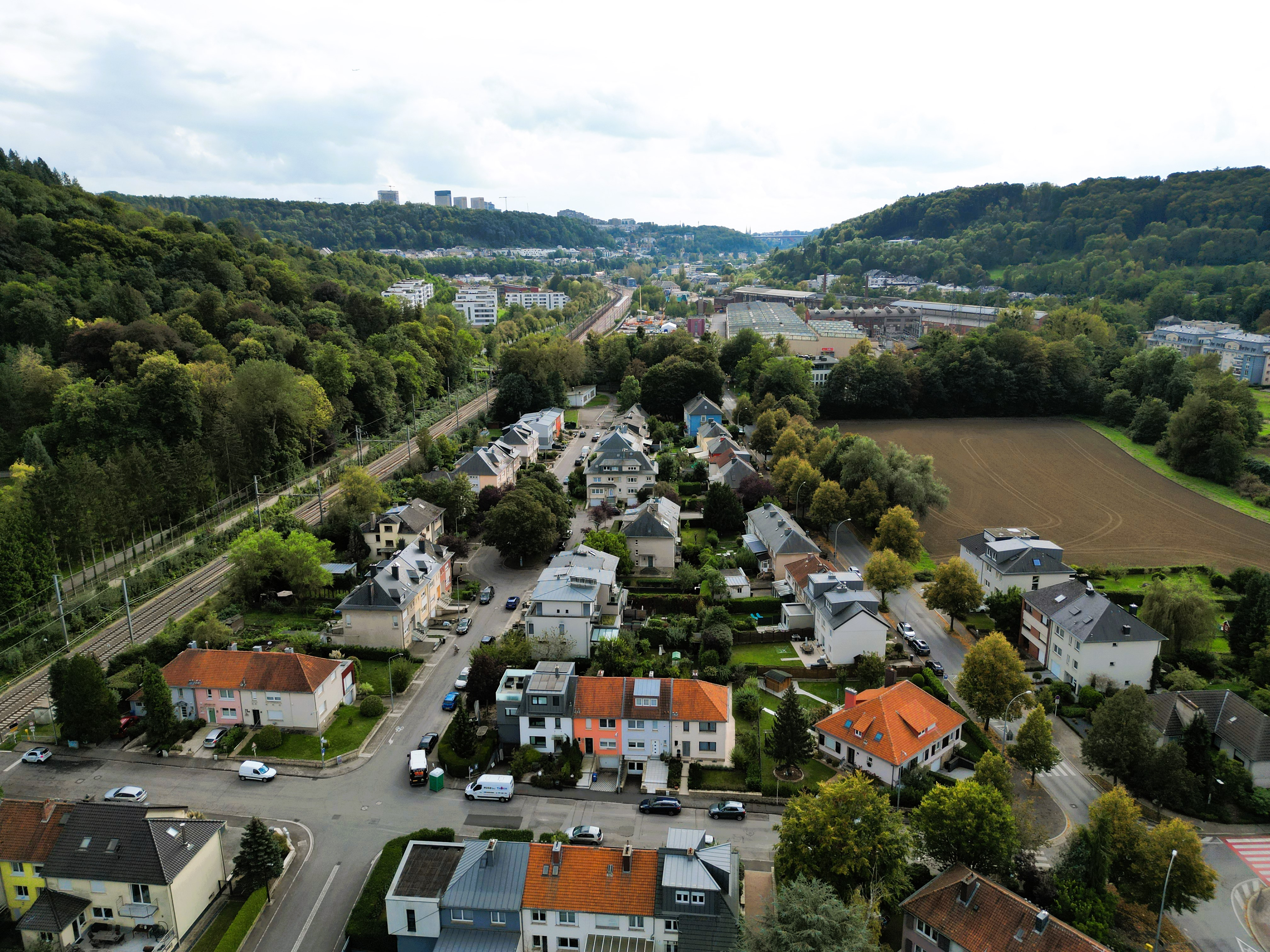

- Beggen is one of 24 districts in Luxembourg City
- Country: Luxembourg
- Commune: Luxembourg City

Area
  - Total: 1.7091 km^{2} (0.6599 sq mi)

Population (31 December 2025)
  - Total: 3,844
  - Density: 2,249/km^{2} (5,825/sq mi)

Nationality
  - Luxembourgish: 33.92%
  - Other: 66.08%
- Website: Beggen

Beggen (German pronunciation: [ˈbɛɡn̩]; Luxembourgish pronunciation: [ˈbæɡən]) is a district in northern Luxembourg City, in southern Luxembourg. As of 31 December 2025, the district has a population of 3,844 inhabitants.

The district is the location of the 19th century Château de Beggen, built on the ruins of a former 18th century paper mill. In the 20th century, the château has served, successively, as the home of the director general of Luxembourg's notable steel company, ARBED, a base for both occupying Wehrmacht forces and, later, the liberating US troops during the Second World War, a hotel, an embassy of the Soviet Union, and currently, the embassy of the Russian Federation in Luxembourg.

Beggen is home to FC Avenir Beggen, a historically successful football club that has struggled in the last years and now plays at level 3 in the Luxembourg football league.
