= Stade Municipal, Rumelange =

Football stadium in Rumelange, Luxembourg

Stade Municipal
- Interactive map of Stade Municipal
- Full name: Stade Municipal
- Location: Rumelange, Luxembourg
- Coordinates: 49°27′26″N 6°02′0″E
- Capacity: 2,950
- Surface: grass

Tenant
- US Rumelange

Stade Municipal is a football stadium in Rumelange, in south-western Luxembourg. It is currently the home stadium of US Rumelange. The stadium has a capacity of 2,950.
