= Luxembourg women's national football team =

Women's national association football team

Luxembourg
- Nickname(s): Rout Léiwinnen (The Red Lionesses)
- Association: Luxembourg Football Federation (Fédération Luxembourgeoise de Football)
- Confederation: UEFA (Europe)
- Head coach: Cristina Correia and Daniel Zirbes
- Captain: Laura Miller
- Most caps: Marta Estévez García (59)
- Top scorer: Amy Thompson (35)
- FIFA code: LUX
First colours	Second colours

FIFA ranking
- Current: 119 ▼5 (20 October 2026)
- Highest: 70 (December 2006)
- Lowest: 122 (April – August 2021)

First international
- Luxembourg 0–4 Slovakia (Junglinster, Luxembourg; 18 November 2006)

Biggest win
- Luxembourg 11–0 Tahiti (Molsheim, France; 19 February 2022)

Biggest defeat
- Luxembourg 0–12 Poland (Koetschette, Luxembourg; 12 February 2014)

The Luxembourg women's national football team represents Luxembourg in international women's football.

Luxembourg women's national football team was founded in 2003, and played its first international game in 2006.

== History ==
=== The beginning ===
Luxembourg made their debut in the qualifying for the European Championships in 2009. Luxembourg were drawn in a group with Slovakia, Lithuania and Malta. Luxembourg finished in second place in the group. Luxembourg failed to qualify for the World Cup in Germany.

=== Stadium ===
The women's team have used various stadiums across Luxembourg as their 'home stadium'. They have only used the national stadium on two occasions: against England and Austria, both part of the 2023 World Cup qualifiers.

== Results and fixtures ==
The following is a list of match results in the last 12 months, as well as any future matches that have been scheduled.

Legend

Win Draw Lose Fixture

=== 2025 ===
28 November Friendly	Cyprus	3–2	Luxembourg	Achnas, Cyprus
14:00	Michail 53'; McBeth 62'; Aristodimou 80'	Report	Thompson 58'; Kirps 83'	Stadium: Dasaki Stadium; Referee: Mari Toumazou (Cyprus)

1 December Friendly	Cyprus	0–3	Luxembourg	Achnas, Cyprus
		Report	Cusick 4' (o.g.); Dietrich 24'; Dos Santos 45'	Stadium: Dasaki Stadium

=== 2026 ===
3 March 2027 FIFA Women's World Cup qualification	Luxembourg	0–5	Scotland	Esch-sur-Alzette, Luxembourg
		Report	Weir 9', 37', 62'; Clark 27'; McGovern 88'	Stadium: Stade Émile Mayrisch; Referee: Kristina Georgieva (Bulgaria)

7 Match 2027 FIFA Women's World Cup qualification	Scotland	7–0	Luxembourg	Glasgow, Scotland
17:00 (16:00 UTC)	McGovern 1', 32'; Clark 10', 55'; Davidson 78'; Lawton 89'; McAneny 90+4'	Report (FIFA); Report (UEFA)		Stadium: Hampden Park; Referee: Nanna Løf Andersen (Denmark)

14 April 2027 FIFA Women's World Cup qualification	Israel	6–0	Luxembourg	Budaörs, Hungary
	Kats 10', 44'; Selimhodzic 13'; Ben Israel 18', 40'; Blokhin 83'	Report (UEFA)		Stadium: BSC Stadium; Attendance: 0 (behind closed doors); Referee: Maria Marotta (Italy)

18 April 2027 FIFA Women's World Cup qualification	Luxembourg	1–3	Israel	Budaörs, Hungary
18:00	Dos Santos 7'	Report (FIFA); Report (UEFA)	Kats 10', 34'; Selimhodzic 37'	Stadium: BSC Stadium; Attendance: 0 (behind closed doors); Referee: Jelena Medjedovic (Serbia)

5 June 2027 FIFA Women's World Cup qualification	Belgium	6–0	Luxembourg	Leuven, Belgium
20:15	Eurlings 11'; Wullaert 19', 46', 66'; Janssens 74', 76'	Report (FIFA); Report (UEFA)		Stadium: Den Dreef; Referee: Ana Maria Terteleac (Romania)

9 June 2027 FIFA Women's World Cup qualification	Luxembourg	0–7	Belgium	Esch-sur-Alzette, Luxembourg
		Report (FIFA); Report (UEFA); Report (FLF)	Wullaert 20'; Tysiak 45', 66'; Detruyer 61'; Eurlings 82', 89'; Iliano 88'	Stadium: Stade de la Frontière; Attendance: 1,053; Referee: Aleksandra Česen (Slovenia)

9 October Friendly	Malta	1–0	Luxembourg	Ta' Qali, Malta
19:00	Bugeja 57'	Report		Stadium: Centenary Stadium; Attendance: 600; Referee: Charlotte Carpenter (Wales)

13 October Friendly	Luxembourg	0–4	Montenegro	Rumelange, Luxembourg
19:00		Report	Kuč 15'; Dešić 17', 40'; Faria 49' (o.g.)	Stadium: Stade Municipal; Attendance: 605; Referee: Karoline Wacker (Germany)

27 November Friendly	Cyprus	v	Luxembourg	Dasaki Achnas, Cyprus
				Stadium: Dasaki Stadium

30 November Friendly	Cyprus	v	Luxembourg	Dasaki Achnas, Cyprus
				Stadium: Dasaki Stadium

== Coaching staff ==
=== Current coaching staff ===
As of 23 October 2026

Role	Name
Head coach	(Germany) Daniel Zirbes
Head coach	(Luxembourg) Cristina Correia
Goalkeeping coach	(Luxembourg) Claude Schumacher
Fitness coach	(Luxembourg) Kim Olafsson
Video analyst	(Luxembourg) Mathieu Schon
Physiotherapist	(Luxembourg) Mathieu Gottini
Physiotherapist	(Luxembourg) Pierre Loesel
Physiotherapist	(Luxembourg) Annick Simoes
Team delegate	(Luxembourg) Elisabeth Thill

=== Manager history ===
- (Luxembourg) Romain Jean (2006–2012)
- (Belgium) Ray Pye (2012–2017)
- (France) Samy Smaïli (2017–2020)
- (Luxembourg) Dan Santos (2020–2026)
- (Luxembourg) Cristina Correia and (Germany) Daniel Zirbes (2026–present)

== Players ==
=== Current squad ===
The following players were named for the friendly matches against Cyprus on 27 and 30 November.

Caps and goals accurate as of match against Montenegro on 13 October 2026.

No.	Pos.	Player	Date of birth (age)	Caps	Goals	Club
	GK	Emma Goetz	6 January 2006 (age 20)	3	0	(Austrian Football Association) Austria Wien
	GK	Joy Jung	17 March 2006 (age 20)	3	0	(Luxembourg Football Federation) Swift Hesperange
	GK	Lisi Oberweis	8 November 1998 (age 28)	1	0	(Luxembourg Football Federation) Mamer 32
	GK	Lucie Schlimé	19 September 2003 (age 23)	43	0	(German Football Association) SC Sand
	DF	Lena Alves	7 November 2007 (age 19)	1	0	(Luxembourg Football Federation) Swift Hesperange
	DF	Ana Barbosa Abreu	13 May 2007 (age 19)	25	1	(Luxembourg Football Federation) Racing Union
	DF	Tânia Carvalho	29 August 2003 (age 23)	0	0	(Portuguese Football Federation) Atlético Ouriense
	DF	Marta Estévez García	5 June 1997 (age 29)	59	7	(Luxembourg Football Federation) Racing Union
	DF	Andreia Faria	23 September 2003 (age 23)	7	0	(Luxembourg Football Federation) Swift Hesperange
	DF	Liane Freymann	3 November 2001 (age 25)	7	0	(German Football Association) Deutz 05
	DF	Emma Kremer	28 July 2000 (age 26)	42	1	(German Football Association) Vorwärts Spoho 98
	DF	Anna Miny	23 May 2007 (age 19)	10	1	(German Football Association) SV Elversberg
	DF	Leila Schmit	9 November 2006 (age 20)	22	0	(German Football Association) Essen II
	MF	Aina Fernández Berenguer	19 October 2010 (age 16)	2	0	(German Football Association) VfL Wolfsburg
	MF	Gioia Fiorucci	23 December 2003 (age 22)	4	0	(Luxembourg Football Federation) Swift Hesperange
	MF	Edina Kocan	27 February 2002 (age 24)	24	0	(Luxembourg Football Federation) Racing Union
	MF	Laura Miller (captain)	7 December 2001 (age 24)	44	7	(German Football Association) 1. FC Nürnberg
	MF	Charlotte Schmit	17 January 2006 (age 20)	36	3	(Portuguese Football Federation) Valadares Gaia
	FW	Anouchka Besch	29 October 1999 (age 27)	12	0	(Luxembourg Football Federation) Differdange 03
	FW	Hannah Dietrich	25 November 2009 (age 16)	12	1	(German Football Association) 1. FC Saarbrücken
	FW	Kimberley Dos Santos	28 February 1998 (age 28)	56	5	(Luxembourg Football Federation) Racing Union
	FW	Joana Lourenco Magalhães	4 June 2004 (age 22)	39	10	(Luxembourg Football Federation) Bettembourg
	FW	Barbara Serra	17 April 2007 (age 19)	6	0	(German Football Association) SpVg Aurich
	FW	Kate Thill	25 January 2002 (age 24)	10	1	(German Football Association) TuS Issel

=== Recent call-ups ===
The following players have been called up to the squad in the past 12 months.

Pos.	Player	Date of birth (age)	Caps	Goals	Club	Latest call-up
DF	Luana Carvalho	10 September 2008 (age 18)	1	0	(Luxembourg) Munsbach	v Belgium, 9 June 2026
DF	Andreia Machado	1 April 1995 (age 31)	36	3	(Luxembourg) Racing Union	v Belgium, 9 June 2026^{RET}
DF	Leticia Mateus	31 July 2004 (age 22)	17	0	(Luxembourg) Jeunesse Junglinster	v Belgium, 9 June 2026
DF	Amal Cherkane	16 September 2006 (age 20)	7	0	(Luxembourg) Bettembourg	v Israel, 18 April 2026
DF	Silvia Conte	20 January 2009 (age 17)	0	0	(Luxembourg) Racing Union	v Israel, 18 April 2026
DF	Joana Ribeiro	1 April 2008 (age 18)	0	0	(Luxembourg) Kehlen	v Israel, 18 April 2026
DF	Rita Leite	14 July 1997 (age 29)	13	1	(Portugal) Leixões	v Montenegro, 13 October 2026
DF	Vera Villegas	15 August 2007 (age 19)	3	0	(Luxembourg) Racing Union	v Montenegro, 13 October 2026
MF	Carmen Kirps	21 March 2009 (age 17)	0	0	(Germany) 1. FC Saarbrücken	v Israel, 18 April 2026
MF	Olivia Konsbrück	9 February 2007 (age 19)	5	0	(Luxembourg) Swift Hesperange	v Scotland, 7 March 2026
MF	Carolina Barbosa de Sousa	30 April 2008 (age 18)	1	0	(Luxembourg) Kehlen	v Montenegro, 13 October 2026
MF	Amélie Feil	18 January 2009 (age 17)	0	0	(Germany) 1. FC Saarbrücken	v Montenegro, 13 October 2026
MF	Catarina Lavinas	28 September 2002 (age 24)	24	0	(Portugal) Ouriense	v Montenegro, 13 October 2026
FW	Amy Thompson	28 July 1994 (age 32)	56	35	(Luxembourg) Differdange	v Belgium, 9 June 2026^{RET}
FW	Diana Teles	19 October 2006 (age 20)	0	0	(Luxembourg) Differdange	v Israel, 18 April 2026
FW	Caroline Jorge	29 November 2005 (age 20)	32	5	(Luxembourg) Racing Union	v Scotland, 7 March 2026
FW	Charlie Jorge	13 November 2008 (age 18)	6	0	(Luxembourg) Racing Union	v Montenegro, 13 October 2026
FW	Rachel Kirps	1 December 2005 (age 20)	12	1	(Germany) 1. FC Magdeburg	v Montenegro, 13 October 2026
Notes: ^{INJ} = Withdrew due to injury; ^{PRE} = Preliminary squad / standby; ^{RET} = Retired from the national team; ^{SUS} = Serving suspension; ^{WD} = Player withdrew from the squad due to non-injury issue.

== Records ==
*Active players in bold, statistics correct as of 9 October 2026.

=== Most capped players ===
Rank	Player	Caps	Goals	Years
1	**Marta Estévez García**	59	7	2016–
2	Amy Thompson	56	35	2011–2026
2	**Kimberley Dos Santos**	56	5	2016–
4	**Laura Miller**	44	7	2019–
5	**Lucie Schlimé**	43	0	2019–
6	**Emma Kremer**	42	1	2018–
7	Jessica Birkel	40	7	2006–2018
8	**Joana Lourenco Magalhães**	39	10	2021–
9	Andreia Machado	36	3	2012–2026
9	**Charlotte Schmit**	36	3	2021–

=== Top goalscorers ===
Rank	Player	Caps	Goals	Years
1	Amy Thompson	56	35	2011–2026
2	Janine Hansen	21	10	2006–2013
2	**Joana Lourenco Magalhães**	39	10	2021–
4	**Laura Miller**	44	7	2019–
4	Jessica Birkel	40	7	2006–2018
4	**Marta Estévez García**	59	7	2016–
7	Karen Marin	12	6	2015–2018
7	Sophie Maurer	18	6	2009–2016
7	**Julie Marques Abreu**	22	6	2019–
10	**Gabriela De Lemos**	23	5	2013–
10	**Caroline Jorge**	32	5	2021–
10	**Kimberley Dos Santos**	56	5	2016–

Most goals in a match
Player	Date	Goals	Opponent	Location	Competition	Line-up
**Joana Lourenco Magalhães**	19 February 2022	5	(French Polynesia) Tahiti	Molsheim, France	International Friendly	Starting

== Competitive record ==
=== FIFA Women's World Cup ===
FIFA Women's World Cup record									Qualification record						
Year	Result	GP	W	D*	L	GF	GA	GD	GP	W	D*	L	GF	GA	GD
(China) 1991 to (China) 2007	Did not exist								Did not exist						
(Germany) 2011	Did not enter								Did not enter						
(Canada) 2015	Did not qualify								3	0	1	2	1	8	-7
(France) 2019	Did not qualify								3	0	0	3	3	21	-18
(Australia) (New Zealand) 2023	Did not qualify								10	3	0	7	9	45	–36
(Brazil) 2027	To be determined								To be determined						
(Costa Rica) (Jamaica) (Mexico) (United States) 2031	To be determined								To be determined						
(United Kingdom) 2035	To be determined								To be determined						
Total	-	-	-	-	-	-	-	-	16	3	1	12	13	74	-61

*Draws include knockout matches decided on penalty kicks.

=== UEFA Women's Championship ===
UEFA Women's Championship record									Qualifying record								
Year	Result	Pld	W	D*	L	GF	GA	GD	Pld	W	D*	L	GF	GA	GD	P/R	Rnk
1984 to (England) 2005	Did not exist								Did not exist								
(Finland) 2009	Did not qualify								3	1	1	1	5	7	-2	–	
(Sweden) 2013	Did not qualify								3	1	0	2	4	9	-5	–	
(Netherlands) 2017	Did not qualify								3	1	0	2	4	8	-4	–	
(England) 2022	Did not enter								Did not enter								
(Switzerland) 2025	Did not qualify								6	1	2	3	5	18	–13	(Note: From Euro 2025 onwards a new qualifying format was introduced, linked to the Women's Nations League where teams are divided into leagues with promotion/relegation between the leagues at the end of each cycle.)	38th
2029	To be determined								To be determined								
Total	-	-	-	-	-	-	-	-	15	4	3	8	18	42	–24	38th	

*Draws include knockout matches decided on penalty kicks.

=== UEFA Women's Nations League ===
UEFA Women's Nations League record
Year	League	Group	Pos	Pld	W	D	L	GF	GA	P/R	Rnk
2023–24	C	2	3rd	6	1	2	3	6	11	Same position	43rd
2025	C	3	1st	6	5	1	0	20	6	▲	35th
Total				12	6	3	3	26	17		

▲	Promoted at end of season
Same position	No movement at end of season
▼	Relegated at end of season
*	Participated in promotion/relegation play-offs

== See also ==
- Sport in Luxembourg
  - Football in Luxembourg
    - Women's Football in Luxembourg
- Luxembourg women's national football team
  - Luxembourg women's national football team results
  - List of Luxembourg women's international footballers
- Luxembourg women's national under-20 football team
- Luxembourg women's national under-17 football team
- Luxembourg men's national football team
