= Stade François Trausch =

Football stadium in Mamer, Luxembourg

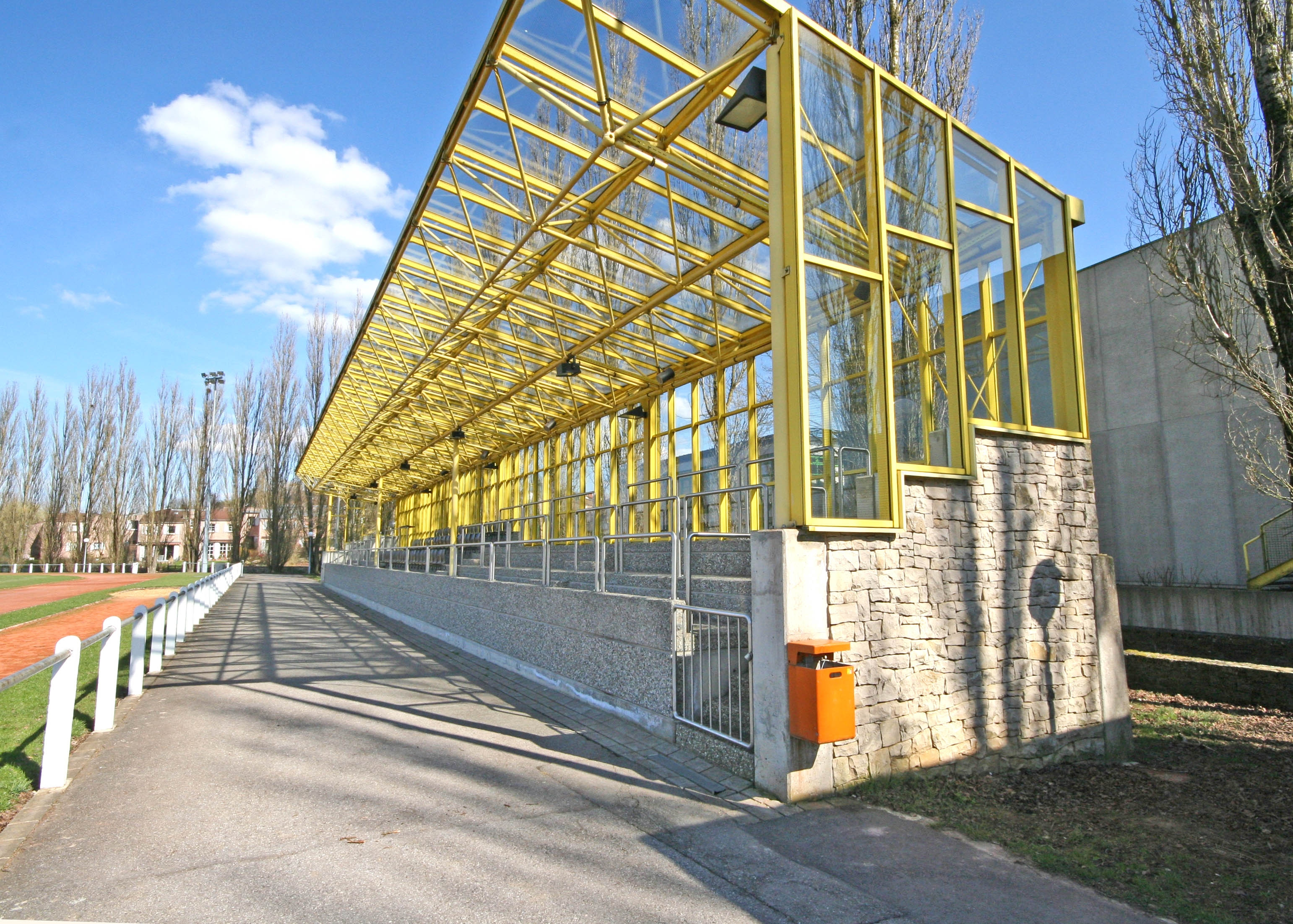
- Stade François Trausch, Mamer, Luxembourg
- Interactive map of Stade François Trausch
- Full name: Stade François Trausch
- Location: Mamer, Luxembourg
- Coordinates: 49.6243°N 6.0248°E
- Capacity: 2,600
- Surface: grass

Tenant
- FC Mamer 32

Stade François Trausch is a football stadium in Mamer, in south-western Luxembourg. It is currently the home stadium of FC Mamer 32. The stadium has a capacity of 2,600.
