= Stade Émile Mayrisch =

Sports stadium in Esch-sur-Alzette, Luxembourg

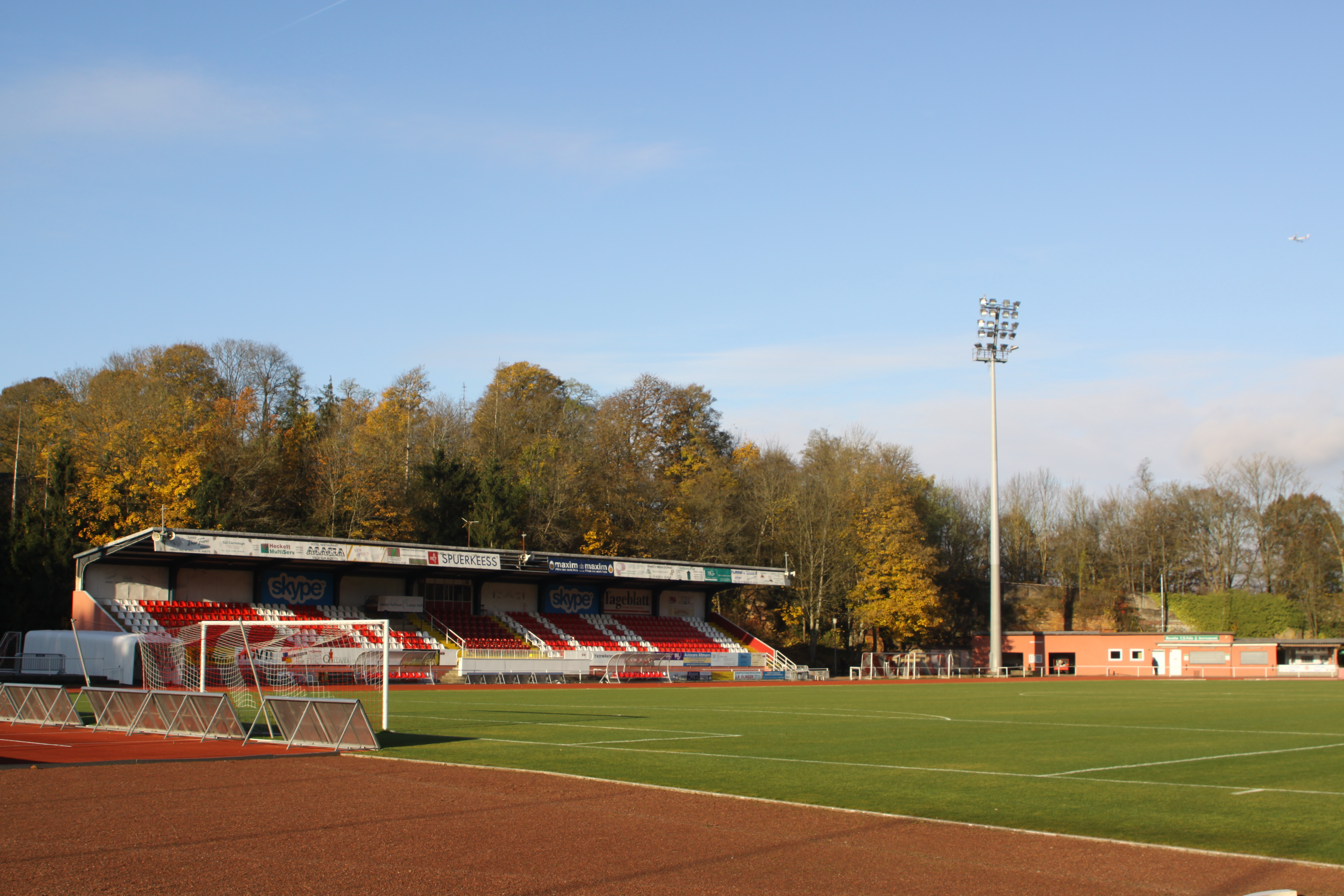
- Stade Émile Mayrisch, Esch-sur-Alzette, Luxembourg
- Interactive map of Stade Émile Mayrisch
- Full name: Stade Émile Mayrisch
- Location: Esch-sur-Alzette, Luxembourg
- Coordinates: 49°29′32″N 5°59′23″E
- Capacity: 1,795
- Surface: grass

Tenant
- CS Fola Esch

Stade Émile Mayrisch is a football and athletics stadium, in Esch-sur-Alzette, in south-western Luxembourg. The stadium has a seating capacity of 1,795. The original capacity before the stadium became all-seater was 3,826. It is named after Luxembourgish industrialist and steel industry trail-blazer Émile Mayrisch. It is the home stadium of the football club CS Fola Esch and the athletics club CA Fola Esch.

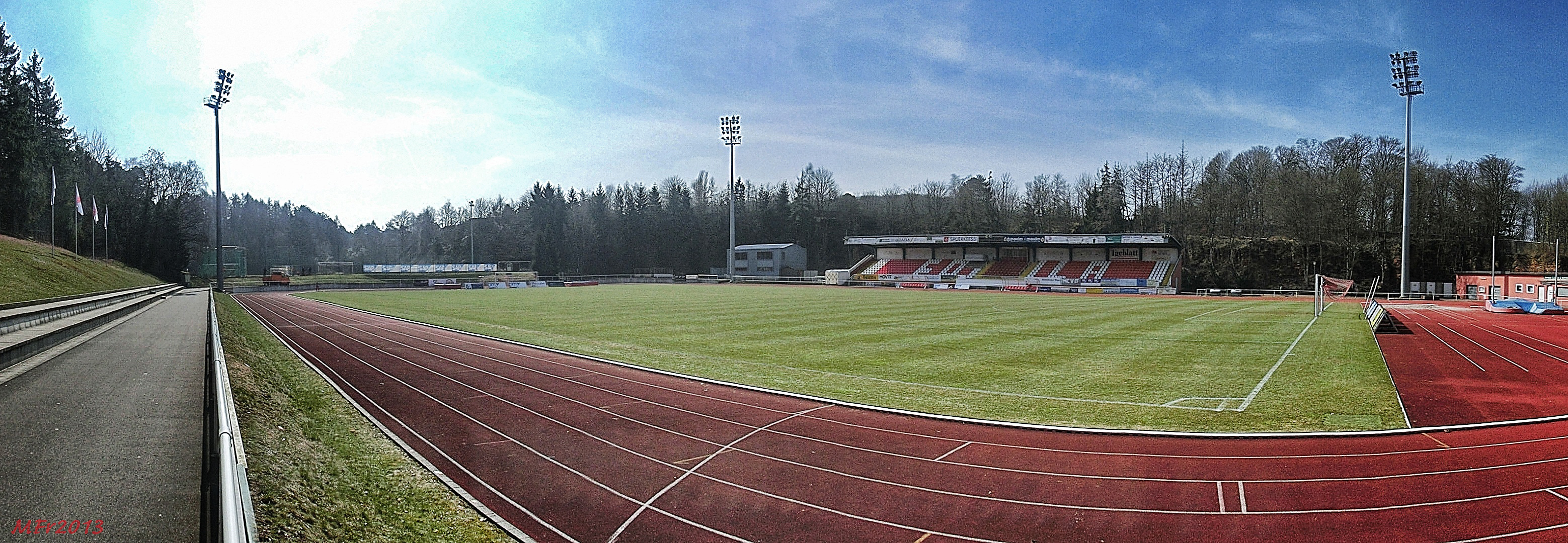
Stade Émile Mayrisch
