= Luxembourg women's national football team results (2000–2019) =

- Win Draw Loss

This is a list of the Luxembourg women's national football team results from their first match in 2006 to the end of 2019.

== 2000s ==
=== 2006 ===
18 November 2006 UEFA Euro 2009 Qualifying	Slovakia	4–0	Luxembourg	Junglinster, Luxembourg
16:00 CET	Dugovičová 55', 58'; Strožová 60', 80'	Report		Stadium: Stade Route de Luxembourg; Referee: Elia Martinez (Spain)

20 November 2006 UEFA Euro 2009 Qualifying	Luxembourg	4–2	Malta	Mamer, Luxembourg
19:30 CET	Birkel 41', 53'; Hansen 72'; Settanni 80'	Report	Carabott 11', 16'	Stadium: Stade François Trausch; Referee: Hilda McDermott (Republic of Ireland)

23 November 2006 UEFA Euro 2009 Qualifying	Lithuania	1–1	Luxembourg	Hostert, Luxembourg
19:00 CET	Bložytė 30'	Report	Leuchter 59'	Stadium: Grengewald; Referee: Hilda McDermott (Republic of Ireland)

=== 2007 ===
29 October 2007 Bosnia Women's Mini-Tournament 2007	Bosnia and Herzegovina	3–2	Luxembourg	Sarajevo, Bosnia and Herzegovina
13:00	Pehić (?)	RSSSF; Fussball-Lux	Leuchter 45'; Alves 88'	Stadium: Stadion Grbavica

2 November 2007 Bosnia Women's Mini-Tournament 2007	Malta	1–1	Luxembourg	Sarajevo, Bosnia and Herzegovina
13:00	N Pace (?)	RSSSF; Fussball-Lux	Da Silva Correria 44'	Stadium: Stadion Grbavica

=== 2008 ===
10 May 2008 Luxembourg Women's Mini-Tournament 2008	Luxembourg	3–0	Latvia	Rodange, Luxembourg
18:00	Birkel 10', 32', 42'	RSSSF; Fussball-Lux		Stadium: Stade Joseph Philippart; Attendance: 250; Referee: Marte Soro (Norway)

12 May 2008 Luxembourg Women's Mini-Tournament 2008	Luxembourg	0–3	Kazakhstan	Niederkorn, Luxembourg
19:30		RSSSF; Fussball-Lux	?; ?; ?	Stadium: Stade Jos Haupert; Attendance: 370; Referee: Marte Soro (Norway)

15 May 2008 Luxembourg Women's Mini-Tournament 2008	Faroe Islands	4–2	Luxembourg	Junglinster, Luxembourg
19:00	Andreasen 7', 50'; Josephsen 52'; Sevdal 90'	RSSSF; Fussball-Lux kvinnufotbolt	Hansen 56', 90+4'	Stadium: errain Route de Luxembourg; Attendance: 429; Referee: Pedro Medina Hernandez (Spain)

30 September 2008 Friendly	Luxembourg	1–6	Wales	Hesperange, Luxembourg
16:00	Hansen 16'; Raths (yellow card) (yellow-red card) 40'	FAW; Fussball-Lux	Jones 23'; Ward 31'; Harries 43'; Manley 49'; Fishlock 54'; Ludlow 90'	Stadium: Stade Alphonse Theis; Attendance: 162; Referee: Leen Martens (Belgium)

27 October 2008 Lithuania Women's Mini-Tournament 2008	Luxembourg	2–6	Faroe Islands	Marijampole, Lithuania
13:00	Hansen 19', 71'	Fussball-Lux	?; ?; ?; ?; ?; ?	Stadium: Sūduva Stadium

29 October 2008 Lithuania Women's Mini-Tournament 2008	Luxembourg	4–3	Lithuania	Marijampole, Lithuania
13:00	Hansen 14', 20', 29'; Blasen 63'	Fussball-Lux	?; ?; ?	Stadium: Sūduva Stadium

=== 2009 ===
5 June 2009 Malta Women's Mini-Tournament 2009	Bulgaria	5–0	Luxembourg	Ta' Qali, Malta
19:45	?; ?; ?; ?; ?	RSSSF; Fussball-Lux		Stadium: Centenary Stadium

7 June 2009 Malta Women's Mini-Tournament 2009	Malta	1–0	Luxembourg	Ta' Qali, Malta
17:30	Theuma 78' (pen.)	RSSSF; Fussball-Lux		Stadium: Centenary Stadium

10 June 2009 Malta Women's Mini-Tournament 2009	Latvia	1–0	Luxembourg	Ta' Qali, Malta
19:45	?	RSSSF; Fussball-Lux		Stadium: Centenary Stadium

18 October 2009 Friendly	Israel	9–1	Luxembourg	Ness Ziona, Israel
	?; ?; ?; ?; ?; ?; ?; ?; ?	Fussball-lux	Hansen 43'	Stadium: Ness Ziona Stadium

== 2010s ==
=== 2010 ===
No matches played in 2010

=== 2011 ===
3 March 2011 UEFA Euro 2013 Qualifying	Luxembourg	2–0	Latvia	Strumica, Macedonia
13:00	Settanni 60' (pen.); Berscheid 70'	Report		Stadium: Stadion Kukuš; Attendance: 15; Referee: Marija Margareta Damjanovic (Croatia)

5 March 2011 UEFA Euro 2013 Qualifying	Luxembourg	1–5	Macedonia	Strumica, Macedonia
13:00	Settanni 82'	Report	Andonova 21', 62'; Brahimi 24'; Salihi 59'; Rochi 90+3'	Stadium: Stadion Mladost; Attendance: 75; Referee: Simona Ghisletta (Switzerland)

8 March 2011 UEFA Euro 2013 Qualifying	Lithuania	4–1	Luxembourg	Strumica, Macedonia
13:00	Imanalijeva 45+2', 85'; Vanagaitė 48'; Stasiulytė 59'	Report	Thompson 65'	Stadium: Stadion Mladost; Attendance: 20; Referee: Marija Margareta Damjanovic (Croatia)

20 April 2011 Friendly	Wales	5–1	Luxembourg	Port Talbot, Wales
18:00	Lea 4', 38', 70'; Atkins 52', 90'	FAW; Fussball-lux	Thompson 20'	Stadium: Marston Stadium; Referee: Paul Fisher (England)

18 June 2011 Friendly	Luxembourg	0–8	Equatorial Guinea	Hostert, Luxembourg
		WeltFussball	unknown (?)	Stadium: Stade Jos Becker

24 November 2011 Friendly	Malta	3–1	Luxembourg	Ta' Qali, Malta
11:00	Sammut 28'; Buttigieg 55'; Saliba 84'	Malta Football; Fussball-lux	Maurer 63'	Stadium: Centenary Stadium; Referee: Efthalia Mitsi (Greece)

=== 2012 ===
5 April 2012 Friendly	Luxembourg	2–3	Malta	Bascharage, Luxembourg
19:00	Maurer 26'; Machado 59'	Malta Football; Fussball-lux	Theuma (?); Carabott (?)	Stadium: Stade Um Dribbel; Attendance: 380; Referee: Stéphanie Frappart (France)

28 November 2012 Friendly	Luxembourg	0–6	Faroe Islands	Niederkorn, Luxembourg
19:30		Fussball-lux	?; ?; ?; ?; ?; ?	Stadium: Stade Jos Haupert; Attendance: 110; Referee: Virginie Derouaux (Belgium)

=== 2013 ===
20 March 2013 Friendly	Luxembourg	1–1	Estonia	Mertzig, Luxembourg
19:30	Thompson 67'	Fussball-lux	?	Stadium: Stade An de Burwiesen; Attendance: 80; Referee: Virginie Derouaux (Belgium)

4 April 2013 2015 World Cup Qualification	Luxembourg	0-0	Latvia	Ta' Qali, Malta
18:30		Report		Stadium: Ta' Qali National Stadium; Attendance: 50; Referee: Floarea Ionescu (Romania)

6 April 2013 2015 World Cup Qualification	Malta	6–0	Luxembourg	Ta' Qali, Malta
13:30	Carabott 12'; Theuma 25' (pen.), 61'; Cuschieri 28'; Xuerreb 29'; Buttigieg 50'	Report		Stadium: Ta' Qali National Stadium; Attendance: 130; Referee: Floarea Ionescu (Romania)

9 April 2013 2015 World Cup Qualification	Luxembourg	1–2	Albania	Ta' Qali, Malta
16:00	Maurer 45'	Report	Jashari 16'; Velaj 69'	Stadium: Ta' Qali National Stadium; Attendance: 40; Referee: Petra Chudá (Slovakia)

=== 2014 ===
12 February 2014 Friendly	Luxembourg	0–12	Poland	Koetschette, Luxembourg
10:30		Fussball-lux

8 April 2014 Friendly	Luxembourg	0–4	Cyprus	Mensdorf, Luxembourg
19:00		CFA; Fussball-lux	Antoniou (?); Georgiou (?); Hafjivasili (?)	Stadium: Stade op Biirk; Attendance: 310; Referee: Leen Martens (Belgium)

29 October 2014 Friendly	Luxembourg	1–0	Lithuania	Koerich, Luxembourg
19:00	Maurer 61'	Fussball-lux		Stadium: Stade Déckebierg; Attendance: 341; Referee: Tânia Morais (Luxembourg

11 December 2014 Friendly	Cyprus	3–2	Luxembourg	Nicosia, Cyprus
14:30	?; ?; ?	Fussball-lux	Thompson 42'; Olafsson 70'	Stadium: Makario Stadium; Attendance: 250

=== 2015 ===
24 March 2015 Friendly	Luxembourg	0–2	Albania	Lintgen, Luxembourg
19:00		Fussball-lux	?; ?	Stadium: Stade Jean Donnersbach; Attendance: 320; Referee: Tânia Morais (Luxembourg

4 April 2015 UEFA Euro 2017 Qualifying	Luxembourg	4–3	Latvia	Orhei, Moldova
11:00	Bidermane 44' (o.g.); Birkel 60'; Thompson 69', 90+5'	Report	Voitāne 17'; Fedotova 57'; Vāciete 72'	Stadium: CSR Orhei; Attendance: 35; Referee: Simona Ghisletta (Switzerland)

6 April 2015 UEFA Euro 2017 Qualifying	Lithuania	2–0	Luxembourg	Orhei, Moldova
11:00	Vanagaitė 16'; Imanalijeva 86'	Report		Stadium: CSR Orhei; Attendance: 41; Referee: Simona Ghisletta (Switzerland)

9 April 2015 UEFA Euro 2017 Qualifying	Moldova	3–0	Luxembourg	Vadul lui Vodă, Moldova
14:00	Chiper 13', 86'; Andone 87'	Report		Stadium: Stadionul CPSM; Attendance: 200; Referee: Sabine Bonnin (France)

=== 2016 ===
26 June 2016 Friendly	Luxembourg	6–0	United Arab Emirates	Medernach, Luxembourg
18:00	Silva Machado 13'; Maurer 33'; Sauber 67' (pen.); Thompson 78'; Frising 81'; Marin 85'	Fussball-lux		Stadium: Stade Bloen Eck; Attendance: 250; Referee: Tânia Morais (Luxembourg

29 June 2016 Friendly	Luxembourg	5–2	United Arab Emirates	Wormeldange, Luxembourg
19:30	Thompson 11', 27', 33'; Maurer 14'; Machado Palma 29'	Fussball-lux		Stadium: Stade Am Ga; Attendance: 250; Referee: Tânia Morais (Luxembourg

4 November 2016 Friendly	Luxembourg	2–1	Faroe Islands	Consdorf, Luxembourg
19:00	De Lemos 43'; Sousa Leite 90+3'	Fussball-lux	?	Stadium: Stade Kuerzwénkel; Attendance: 120; Referee: Tânia Morais (Luxembourg

6 November 2016 Friendly	Luxembourg	1–1	Faroe Islands	Itzig, Luxembourg
18:30	Sousa Leite 19'	Fussball-lux	?	Stadium: Stade Albert Kongs; Attendance: 125; Referee: Tânia Morais (Luxembourg

=== 2017 ===
6 April 2017 2019 World Cup Qualification	Faroe Islands	5–1	Luxembourg	Tórshavn, Faroe Islands
20:30 (19:30 WEST)	H. Sevdal 7', 64'; Klakstein 18'; Á. Johannesen 37'; Arge 54'	Report	Birkel 88'	Stadium: Tórsvøllur; Attendance: 195; Referee: Petra Chudá (Slovakia)

8 April 2017 2019 World Cup Qualification	Turkey	9–1	Luxembourg	Tórshavn, Faroe Islands
20:30 (19:30 WEST)	Topçu 10'; Pekel 17', 51', 70'; Elias 40' (o.g.); Altunkulak 57', 75', 86'; Karagenç 90+3'	Report	De Lemos 58'	Stadium: Tórsvøllur; Attendance: 45; Referee: Sarah Garratt (England)

11 April 2017 2019 World Cup Qualification	Luxembourg	1–7	Montenegro	Tórshavn, Faroe Islands
14:00 (13:00 WEST)	De Lemos 80'	Report	Bulatović 5', 27'; Djoković 35', 45+5'; Pavičević 48'; Kuč 50', 56'	Stadium: Gundadalur; Attendance: 10; Referee: Sarah Garratt (England)

=== 2018 ===
3 March 2018 Friendly	Morocco	7–1	Luxembourg	Tangier, Morocco
15:00	?; ?; ?; ?; ?; ?; ?	Fussball-lux	Da Silva 85'	Stadium: Grand Stade de Tanger

7 October 2018 Friendly	Luxembourg	0–4	Estonia	Wiltz, Luxembourg
19:00 (UTC+2)		Fussball-lux; EFA	Kubassova 52'; Loo 65', 67' (pen.); Saulep 86'	Stadium: Terrain Poetz-Weidingen; Attendance: 150; Referee: Angelika Söder (Germany)

10 November 2018 Friendly	Andorra	0–2	Luxembourg	Andorra la Vella, Andorra
18:00		Fussball-lux; RTL Today	Marin 84', 90+3'; De Bruyn (yellow card) (yellow-red card) 85'	Stadium: Estadi Comunal; Attendance: 500; Referee: Ainara Andrea Acevedo Dudley (Spain)

23 November 2018 Singapore Women's Mini-Tournament 2018	Indonesia	0–1	Luxembourg	Kallang, Singapore
10:00		Fussball-lux	Thompson 53'	Stadium: Jalan Besar Stadium

25 November 2018 Singapore Women's Mini-Tournament 2018	Singapore	0–4	Luxembourg	Kallang, Singapore
10:00		Fussball-lux	Marin 5', 6', 36'; Machado Palma 90+3'	Stadium: National Stadium

=== 2019 ===
21 June 2019 Friendly	Luxembourg	2–1	Andorra	Bettembourg, Luxembourg
19:00	Da Silva 22'; Delgado 62'	Fussball-lux; Report FAF; Report FLF	Tizón 60'	Stadium: Stade Municipal, Bettembourg; Attendance: 350; Referee: Viki de Cremer (Belgium)

9 November 2019 Friendly	Luxembourg	0–5	Kosovo	Bissen, Luxembourg
16:00		FFK; Fussball-lux	Reçica (?); Memeti (?); ? (?); Ejupi (?)	Stadium: Terrain ZAC Klengbousbierg; Attendance: 348; Referee: Viki de Cremer (Belgium)
