= Portuguese in Luxembourg =

Nationals and ethnics of Portugal in Luxembourg

Portuguese Luxembourgers
Portugisen zu Lëtzebuerg (Luxembourgish) Luso-luxemburgueses (Portuguese) Portugais au Luxembourg (French) Portugiesen in Luxemburg (German)

Total population
- 142,016(2022)

Regions with significant populations
- Throughout Luxembourg
- Esch-sur-Alzette canton: 41,969(2023)
- Luxembourg canton: 17,838(2023)
- Diekirch canton: 7,898(2023)

Languages
- Portuguese, Luxembourgish, French, German, English

Religion
- Roman Catholicism, Irreligion

Related ethnic groups
- Portuguese in Belgium, Portuguese in France, Portuguese in Germany, Portuguese in the Netherlands, Cape Verdeans in Luxembourg

Portuguese Luxembourgers, (Note: Luxembourgish: Portugisen zu Lëtzebuerg / lëtzebuerger Portugisen; Portuguese: portugueses no Luxemburgo) also known as Luso-Luxembourgers, (Note: Portuguese: luso-luxemburgueses / lusoburgueses) are citizens or residents of Luxembourg whose ethnic origins lie in Portugal, including both Portuguese-born citizens with Luxembourg citizenship and Luxembourg-born citizens of Portuguese ancestry or citizenship.

Although estimates of the total Portuguese Luxembourg population vary, on 1 January 2023 there were 92,101 foreign people residing in Luxembourg and holding Portuguese nationality. Six years earlier, in 2017, 96,779 foreigners were holding Portuguese citizenship in Luxembourg. Although their number seems to have decreased by 4,678 people in six years, it is important to remember that 7,337 Portuguese citizens acquired the nationality of their host country in the same period. These figures, in fact, exclude many people of Portuguese ancestry or naturalized Luxembourg citizens.

Dealing with foreigners only, foreigners holding Portuguese citizenship constitute 14.5% of the population of Luxembourg, making them the largest group of foreign citizens living in the country.

On the other hand, according to statistics from the Portuguese embassy the country, there are 142,016 registered Portuguese citizens. They thus make up 22.9% of the population of the country, and they are, by far, the second-largest ethnicity in Luxembourg only behind native Luxembourgers.

== History ==
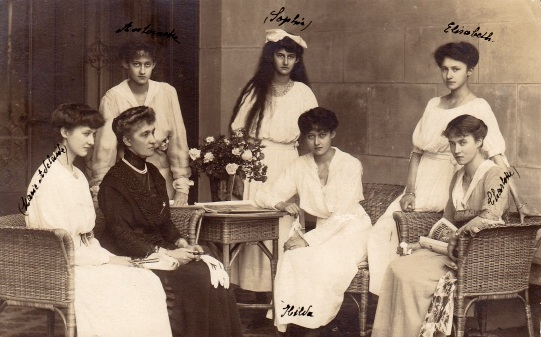
Maria Ana, Grand Duchess and Regent of Luxembourg with her daughters

From 1875 onwards, Luxembourg's economy relied upon the immigration of cheap labor of mostly Italians to work in the country's steel mills and to counter the natural demographic decline of the native Luxembourgish population.

The connections between Portugal and Luxembourg can be traced back to the late 19th century when, in 1893, Prince Guillaume Alexandre of Nassau married Marie Anne de Braganza, the daughter of the King of Portugal.

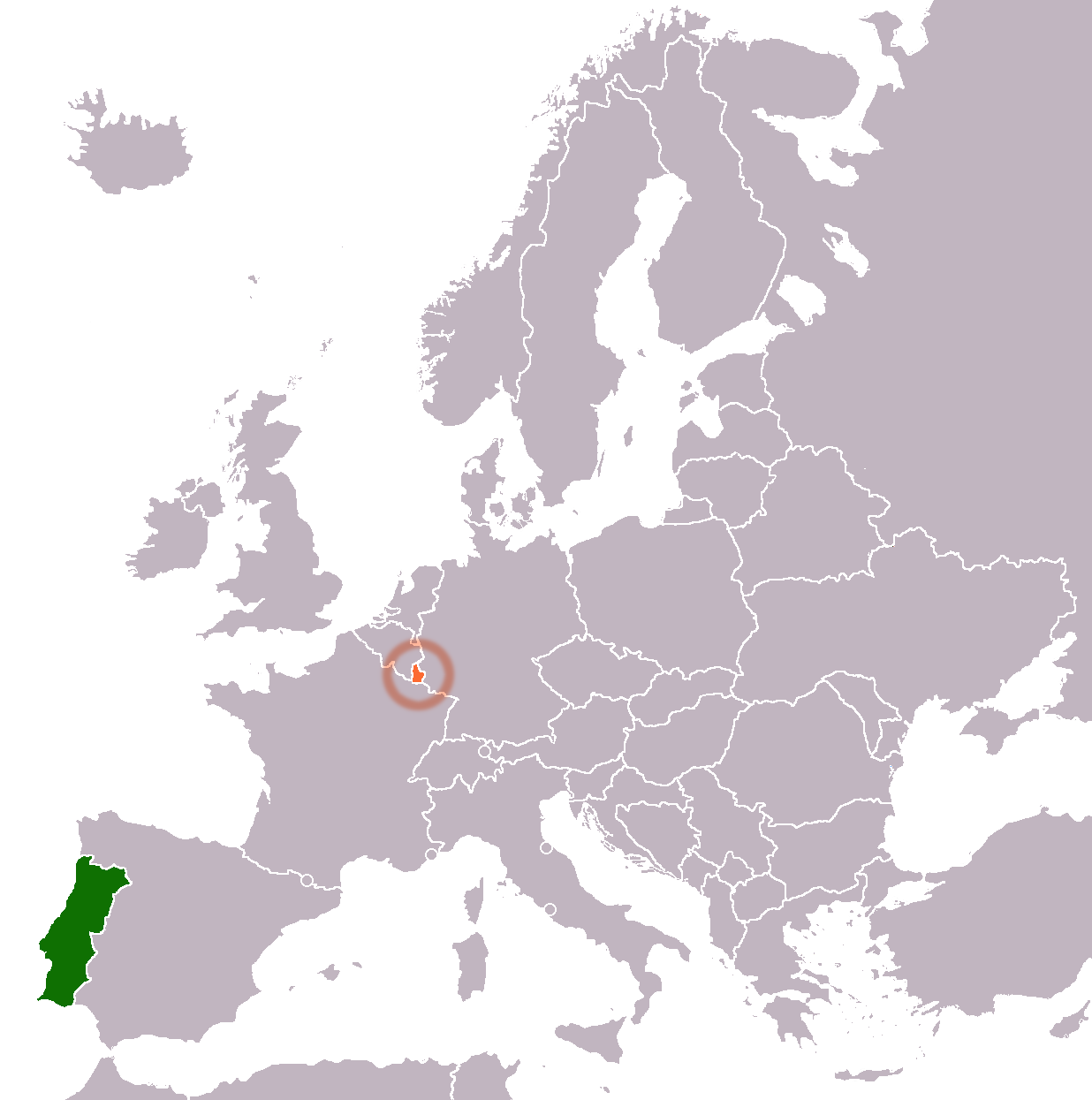
Map showing the respective location of the two countries within Europe

Luso-Luxembourg relations have steadily strengthened over the years. During the Second World War, when the German invasion of May 1940 undermined the sovereignty of the Grand Duchy, many Luxembourgers sought refuge in Portugal. However, after the war, Portugal, which had been under the governance of an authoritarian regime headed by Oliveira Salazar, witnessed a significant portion of its population plunge into poverty.

Until the 1960s the waves of immigrants were predominated by Germans and Italians, but, by the 1960s, the influx of foreign workers from these countries slowed, as their home countries' economies had recovered. By 1967, the Italian expatriate population had begun to decline as Italians returned home. This coincided with the rise of a booming financial services sector, which caused native Luxembourgers to turn away from industrial jobs.

The mid-1960s saw the arrival of the first Portuguese guest workers (including Cape Verdeans, who also held Portuguese citizenship).

At the time, Portugal was ruled as a nationalist authoritarian conservative regime, and an economic downturn coincided with the so-called 'Academic Crisis' and deteriorating conditions in Portugal's colonies to put further pressure on many young Portuguese people to emigrate. Nevertheless, as no formal agreement had been established between the two countries at that time, such immigration was largely considered illegal.

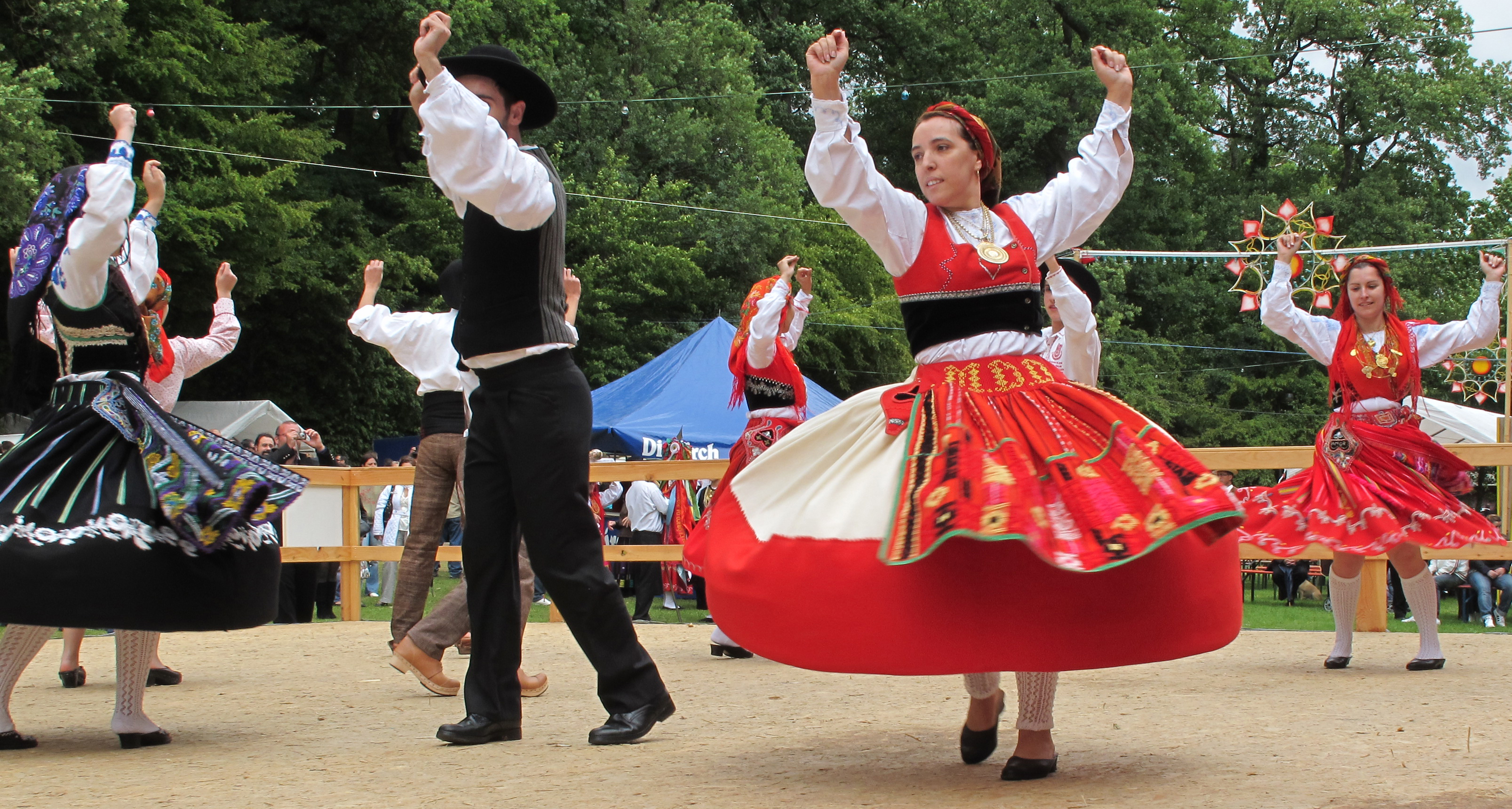
Portuguese folk dancing in Kockelscheuer

The two countries signed a treaty in Lisbon in 1970 to allow family unification, and this was enshrined into Luxembourgish law in 1972. This turned the Portuguese community into a demographically self-sustaining unit, marking it out as separate from the Germans, who had little desire to move permanently to Luxembourg, and Italians, who were not granted special status for family immigration.

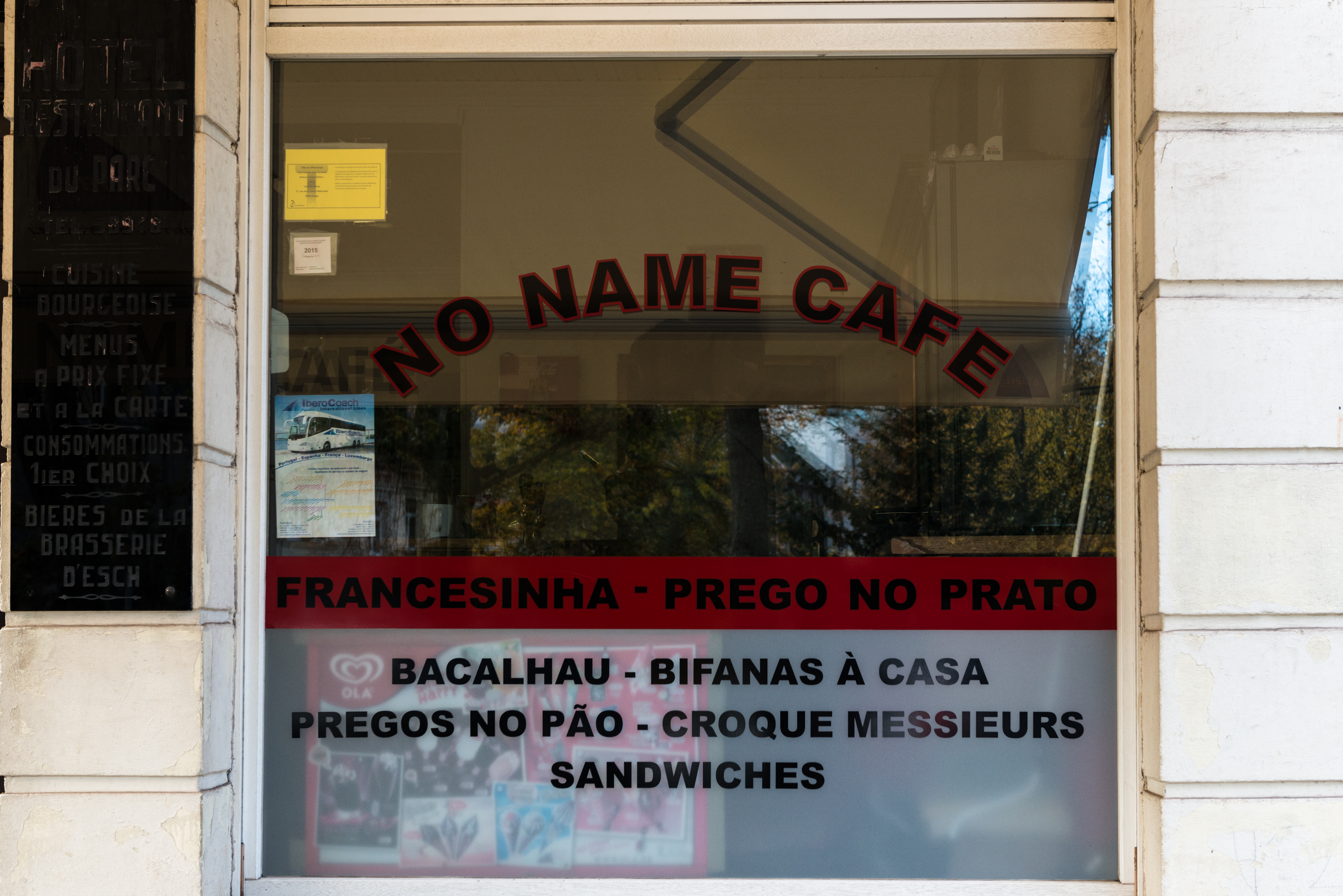
Portuguese café in Luxembourg

When Portugal entered the European Economic Community in 1986, Portuguese citizens were to be guaranteed the same rights to the labor market as Luxembourgish citizens. All countries were given a transitional period of seven years to adapt to the new conditions, during which they could impose restrictions upon immigration from Portugal (and Spain, the other new EEC member). Luxembourg was given a longer transitional period, of ten years, as the government feared a large influx of Portuguese immigrants. When, in 1990, the government found that immigration had barely increased since 1985, it dropped its limitations.

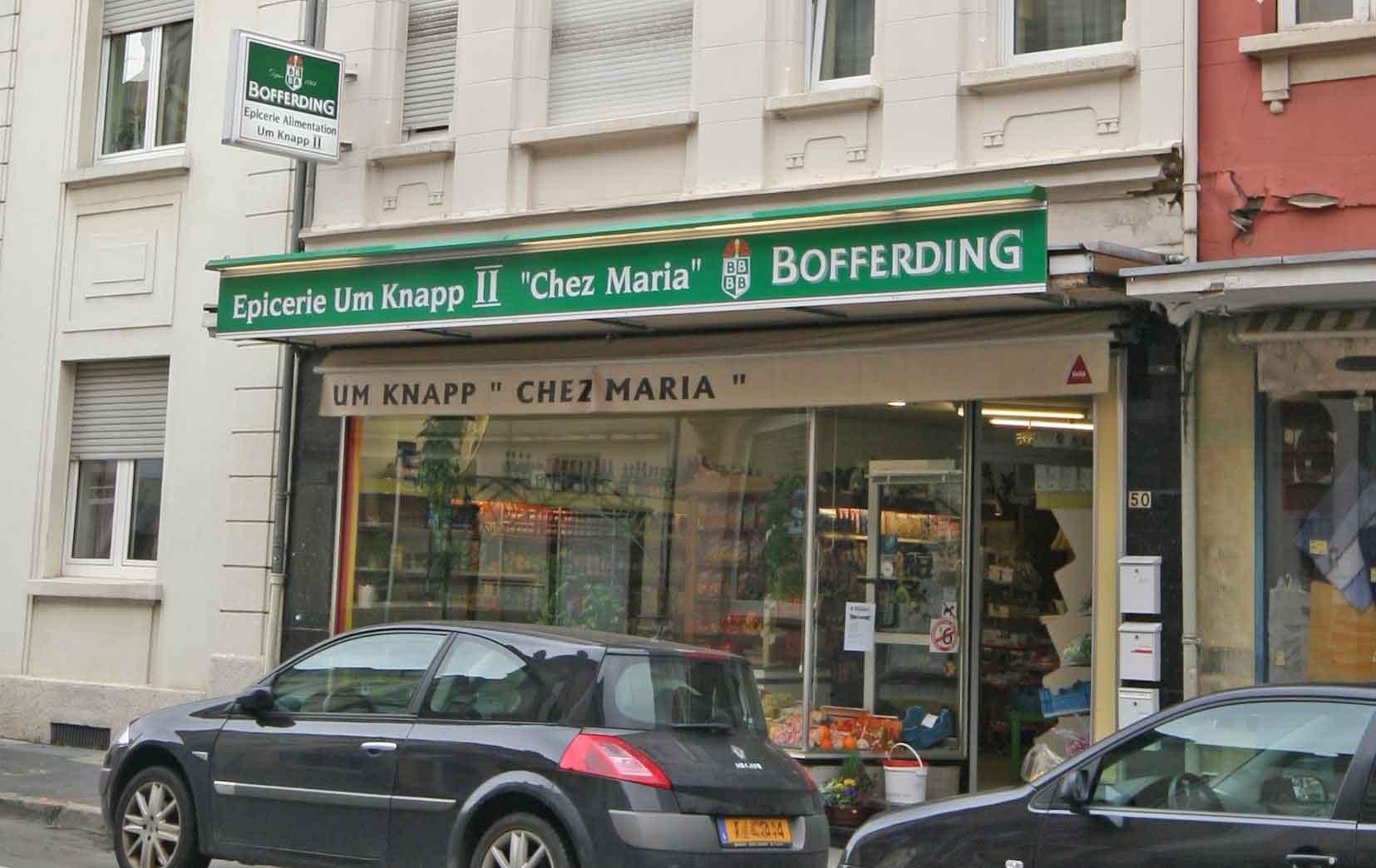
Portuguese business in Luxembourg

The Portuguese community in Luxembourg grew steadily, from 6,000 people in 1970 (1.8% of the population) to 29,309 in 1981 (8.0% of the population) to 39,903 in 1991 (10.3% of the population). In the 2001 census, there were 58,657 inhabitants with Portuguese nationality (13.3% of the population), up from negligibly few in 1960. Their number increased further to 82,363 people in 2011 (15.8% of the population), fueled by the economic crisis that hit Portugal starting in 2008. Their share of the total population topped in 2014, when the 90,764 Portuguese nationals represented over 16.5% of the country's population. As the Portuguese community became more integrated, the numbers of foreigners started dropping. Of the approximately 18,600 Portuguese citizens who acquired Luxembourgish citizenship since 2000, 58.2% of them (approximately 10,820 people) did so after 2014.

== Demographics ==
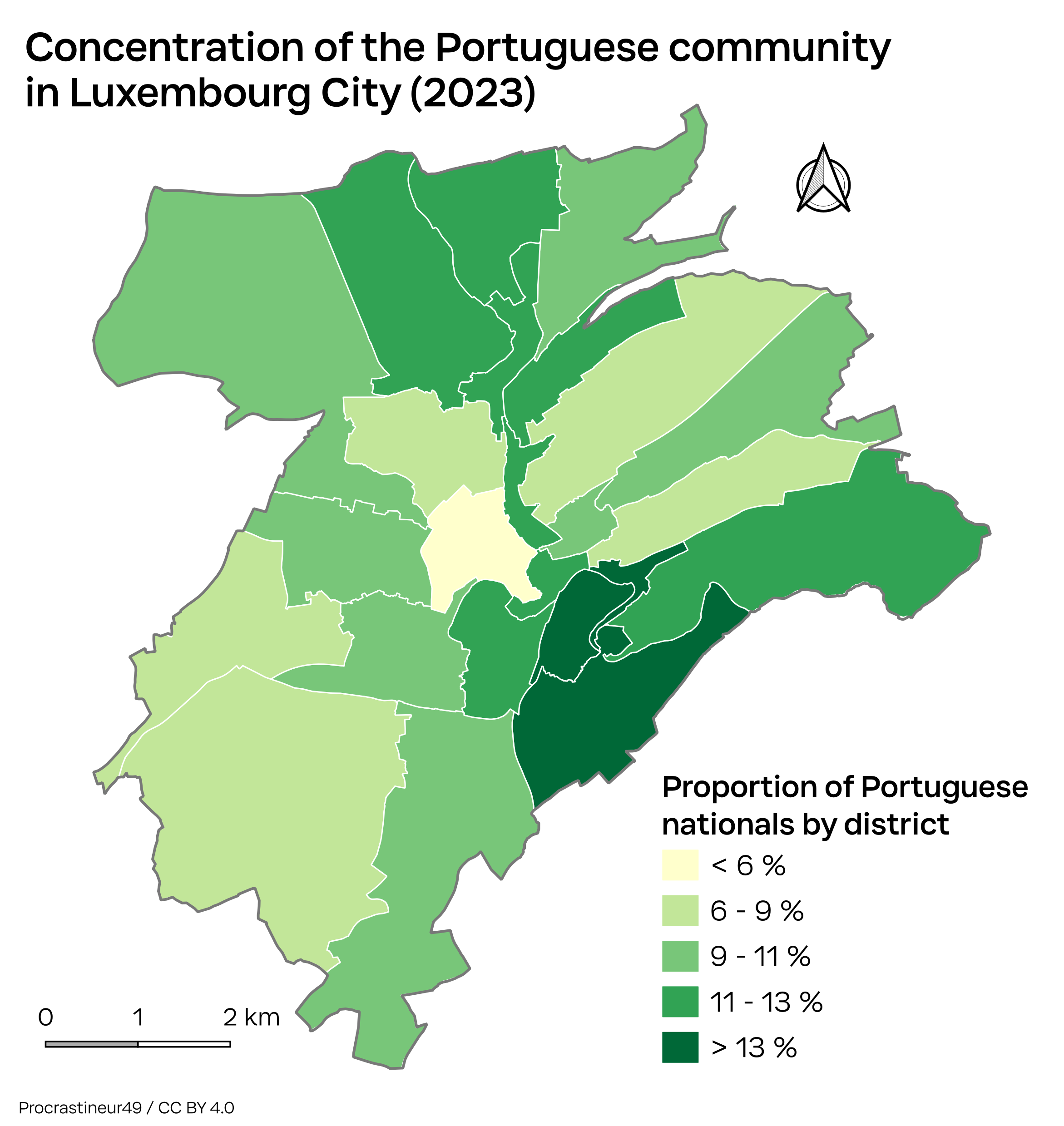
Map of the districts of Luxembourg City by Portuguese population

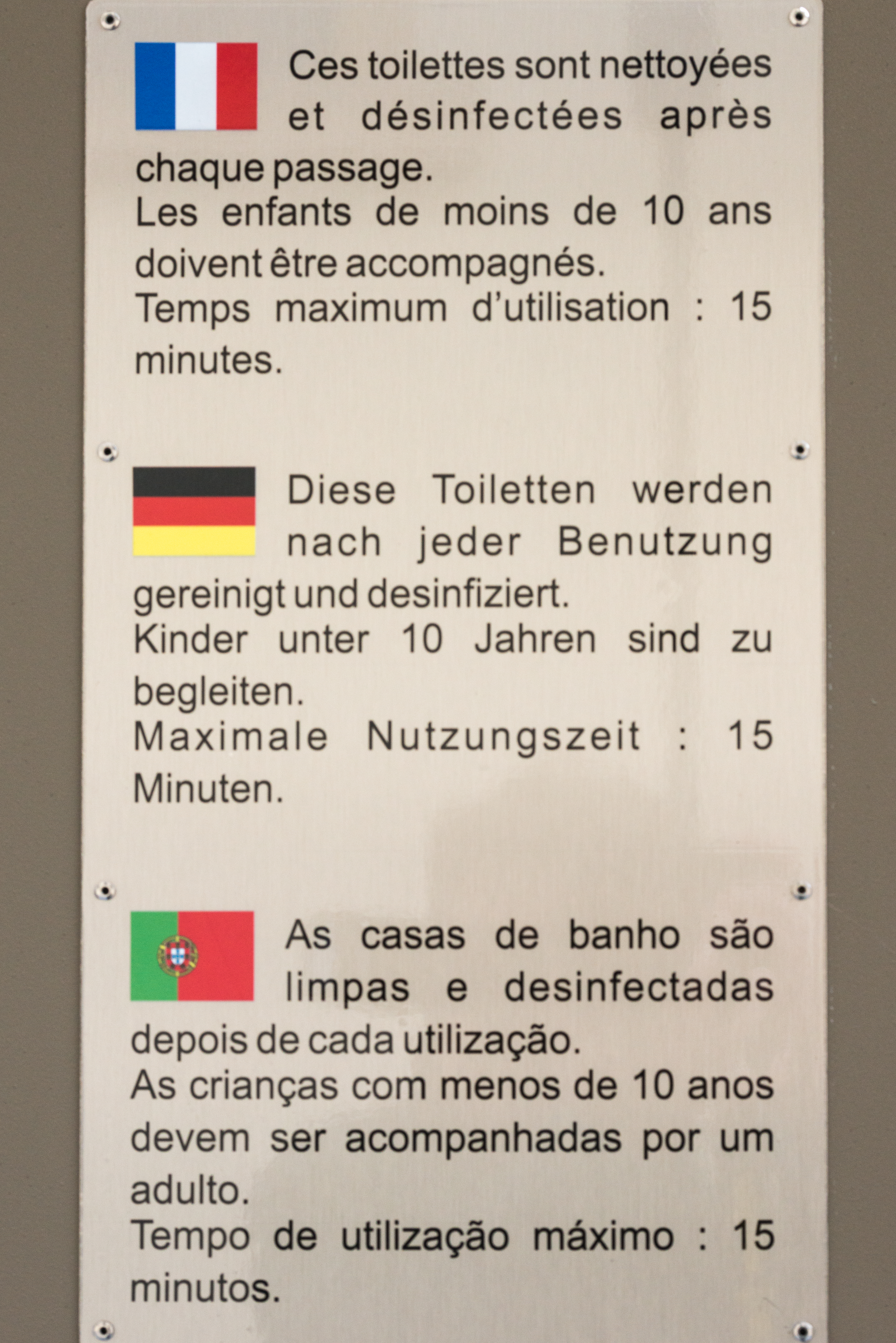
Public sign in French, German and Portuguese in Luxembourg

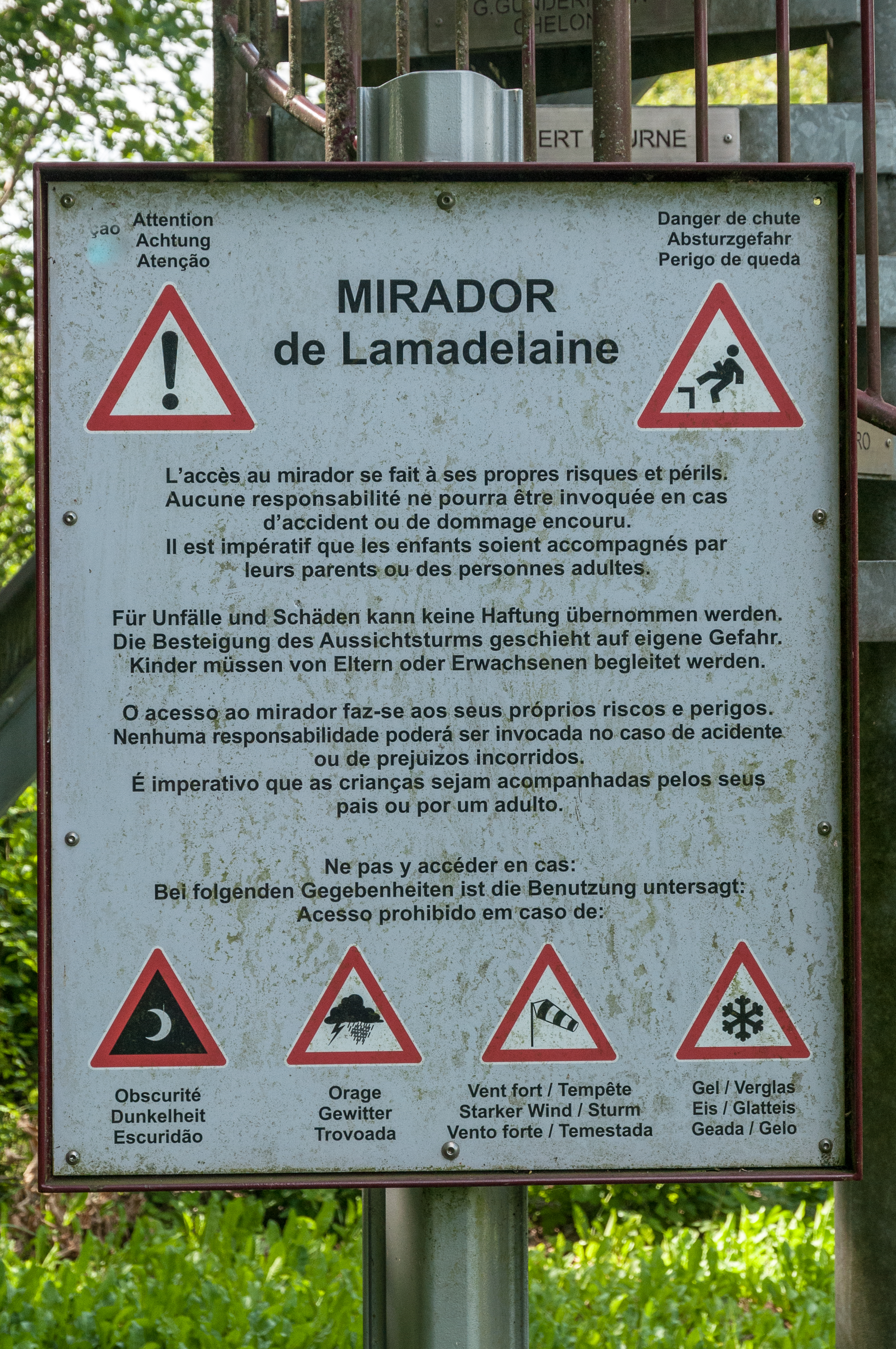
Public sign in French, German and Portuguese in Luxembourg

It is illegal to collect statistics about the race, ethnicity, or ancestry of Luxembourg citizens, which makes it very difficult to come to a proper estimate of the number of Portuguese Luxembourgers.

Although continuous, the migratory history of the Portuguese in Luxembourg has experienced varying levels of intensity over the period 1970–2010. While the annual number of departures has remained relatively constant during this period (between 1,000 and 1,500), the annual number of arrivals has shown more pronounced fluctuations.

The most significant influx of arrivals occurred during the period 1970–1975, averaging around 4,500 arrivals per year. From 1976 to 1987, the flow of migration considerably slowed down, with an average of 1,500 arrivals per year, and there were even more departures than arrivals between 1982 and 1985.

Between 1988 and 1993, there was a resurgence in the number of arrivals, stabilizing at around 3000 per year. Subsequently, from 1994 to 2001, the number of arrivals slowed down once again, averaging around 2000 per year. Since 2002, Portuguese immigration has experienced a rebound, with an annual number of arrivals approaching 4,000.

In total, from 1970 to 2006, 97,000 Portuguese individuals have arrived in Luxembourg, while 48,000 have departed, resulting in a net surplus of 49,000 people.

Considering their date of arrival in the Luxembourgish territory, the age at which they came, and their place of birth (Portugal or Luxembourg), we categorized the adult individuals of Portuguese nationality or born in Portugal, who were present in 2006, into four groups:

- First-time entrants settled in Luxembourg before 1982 (17%)
- First-time entrants settled in Luxembourg between 1982 and 1993 (29%)
- First-time entrants settled in Luxembourg after 1993 (34%)
- Second-generation Portuguese immigrants who were either born in Luxembourg or arrived in Luxembourg before the age of 12 (20%).

The profiles of the first-time entrants, regardless of their entry date in Luxembourg, show relative uniformity. However, the profile of second-generation immigrants stands out significantly from that of first-time entrants.

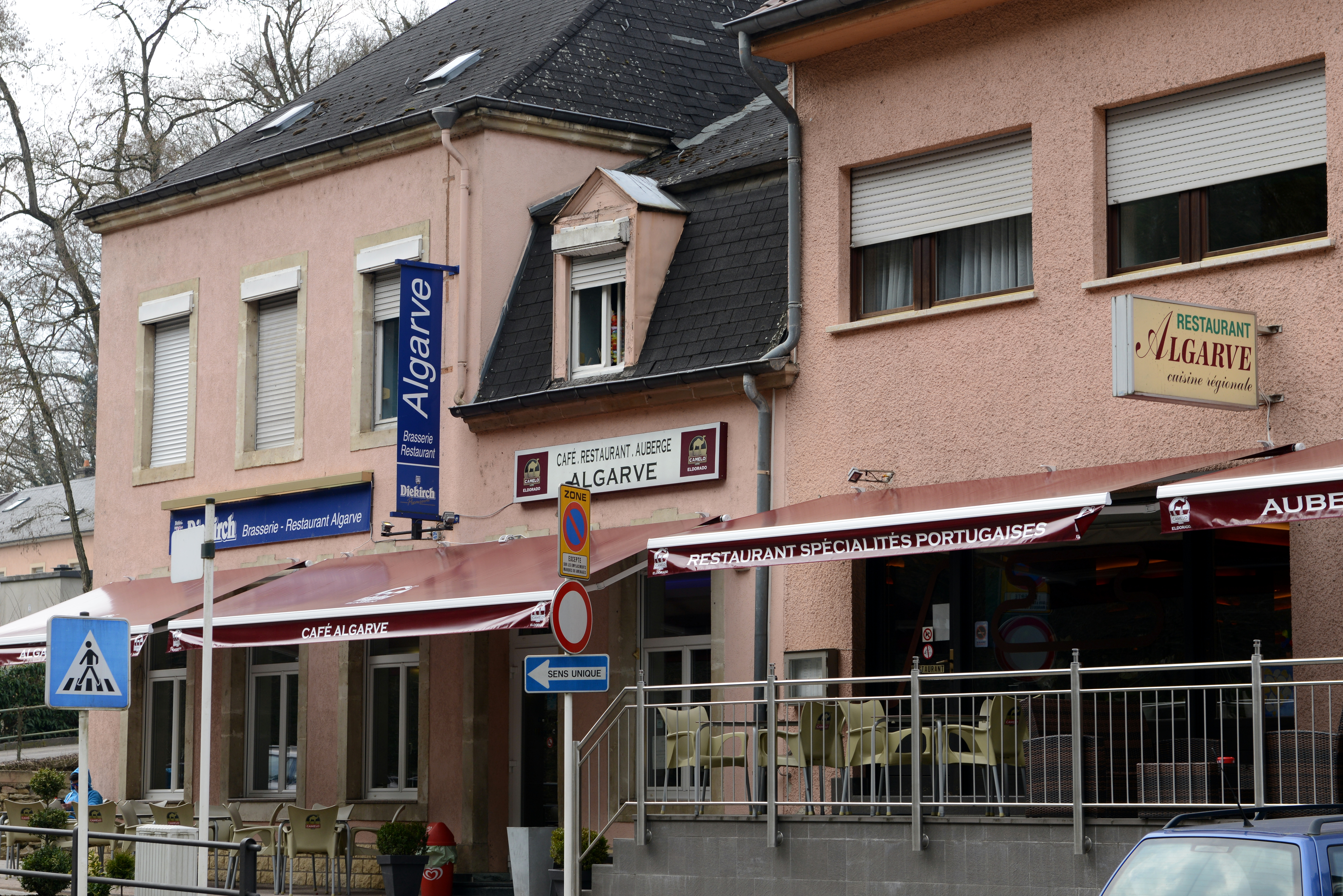
Portuguese restaurant in Luxembourg

When comparing the highest educational attainment among these distinct groups, it becomes evident that approximately 90% of first-time entrants have not surpassed the primary educational level. The situation slightly improves for those who have arrived more recently due to advancements in the educational system in Portugal. Though more educated than first-time entrants, the second-generation immigrants, all of whom have undergone Luxembourg's educational system, still have 32% who have not exceeded the primary level, 58% who have achieved a secondary education diploma (with the majority obtaining vocational or technical diplomas), and 10% who hold a higher education diploma. For comparison, Luxembourgers of the same age who completed their compulsory education in Luxembourg have a 29% rate of possessing a higher education diploma.

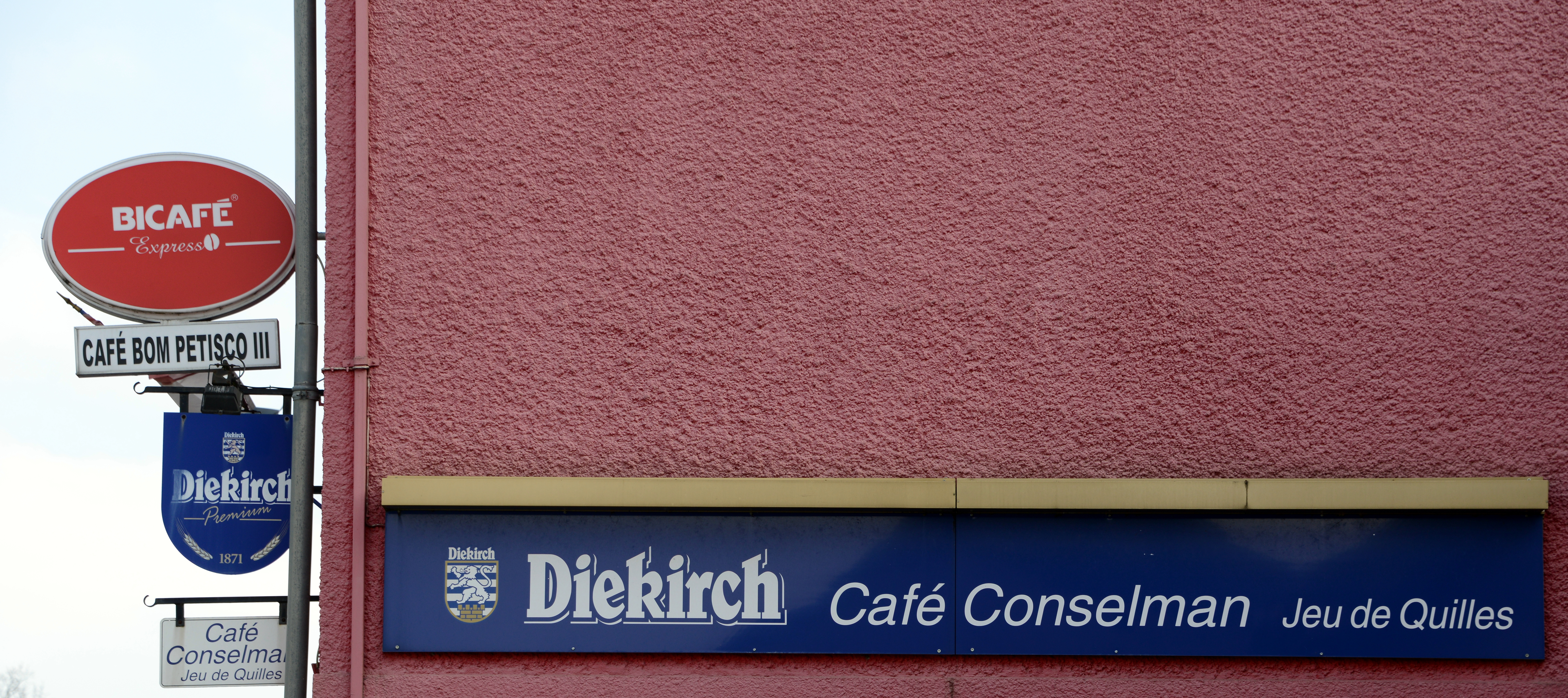
Portuguese café in Luxembourg

Almost 27,000 Portuguese migrated towards Luxembourg from 2007 to 2013: The surge in the number of Portuguese settling in the country unsurprisingly coincides with the period of economic crisis. For instance, in 2012 the unemployment rate in Portugal soared to 16.1%.

The number of Portuguese entering the country, although lower than in the past, has consistently remained above 3,000 people per year since 2003 and they still are the first immigrant community entering the country every year.

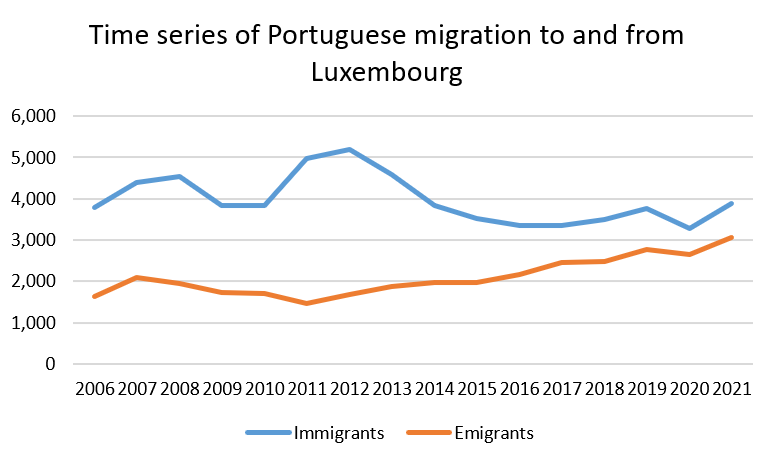
Time series of migrations involving Portuguese citizens in Luxembourg (2006–2021)

In recent years, there has been growing emigration amongst Portuguese nationals in Luxembourg, and the number of emigrants is, as of 2021, almost equal to the number of immigrants. This might be due to the better economic conditions found in Portugal, as well as to the ageing of the Portuguese community in Luxembourg, meaning older migrants are starting retiring and are going back to their homeland.

As of today, the Portuguese are part of a wider Portuguese-speaking community in Luxembourg, comprising up to 13,000 people from PALOP countries (the overwhelming majority being from Guinea-Bissau or from Cape Verde), Timor-Leste or Macau and 10,000 Brazilians. People from CPLP countries thus number around 174,000 people, accounting for 26.4% of the population of Luxembourg. Luxembourg is the Benelux country with the largest community of people coming from CPLP countries: In Belgium there are around 156,000 people (1.33% of the population) while in The Netherlands there are around 147,500 people (0.84% of the population). Possibly, Luxembourg is the country with the highest proportion of Portuguese speakers whose official language isn't Portuguese, only behind Uruguay.

The Portuguese community in Luxembourg retains strong ties with its homeland and, between 2000 and 2021, it has sent approximately 2.035 billion euros (€) to Portugal in remittances. In the same timeframe, Luxembourgers in Portugal (numbering around 600 individuals) have sent approximately 24.83 million euros (€) to Luxembourg.

== Cape Verdeans ==
Prior to 1975, Cape Verdean immigrants were registered as Portuguese immigrants from the overseas province of Portuguese Cape Verde. In 1995, it was estimated that there were 3,000 people of Cape Verdean descent in Luxembourg. As of 2024, there were officially 2,518 Cape Verdean citizens in Luxembourg, but according to 2020 estimates, there might be as many as 12,000 Cape Verdeans living in the country (1.8% of the total population), which would make it the highest ratio of Cape Verdeans in any foreign country."

The two countries have strong ties and the community is very well integrated. In the 2023 communal elections, for instance, there were around 30 people of Cape Verdean descent amongst the candidates. Among these, for instance, was Natalie Silva, who served as mayor of Larochette (where over a third of inhabitants are Portuguese) from 2017 to 2023, as the first Lusophone person to lead a Luxembourgish commune.

== Notable people ==
- Artur Abreu (1994): Luxembourgish footballer
- Paolo Amodio (1973): Luxembourgish football manager and former footballer
- Yannick Bastos (1993): Luxembourgish footballer
- Félix Braz (1966): Luxembourgish politician
- Liz Braz (1996): Luxembourgish politician
- David Caiado (1987): Portuguese former footballer
- Tamara Cardoso (1993): Luxembourgish footballer
- Charlotte, Grand Duchess of Luxembourg (1896–1985): reigned as Grand Duchess of Luxembourg from 14 January 1919 until her abdication on 12 November 1964
- Cathy Da Silva Sousa (1994): Luxembourgish footballer
- Julien Darui (1916–1987): French football goalkeeper
- Gabriela De Lemos (1997): Luxembourgish footballer
- Ricardo Delgado (1994): Luxembourgish footballer
- Lea Folgueira (1999): Luxembourgish footballer
- Caroline Jorge (2005): Luxembourgish footballer
- Hana Sofia Lopes (1990): Luso-Luxembourgish Actor
- Joana Lourenco Magalhães (2004): Luxembourgish footballer
- Mariana Lourenco Magalhães (2004): Luxembourgish footballer
- Alexia Magalhães (2000): Luxembourgish footballer
- Ricardo Marques (1993): Luxembourgish politician
- Julie Marques Abreu (2004): Luxembourgish footballer
- Kelly Mendes (1997): Luxembourgish footballer
- Daniel da Mota (1985): Luxembourgish footballer
- Dany Mota (1998): Luso-Luxembourgish footballer
- Carina Nogueira (1982): Luxembourgish footballer
- Joël Pedro (1992): Luxembourgish footballer
- Dylan Pereira (1997): Luso-Luxembourgish racing driver
- Diogo Pimentel (1997): Luxembourgish footballer
- Mica Pinto (1993): Luxembourgish footballer
- Gerson Rodrigues (1995): Luxembourgish footballer
- Marisa Soares Marques (1993): Luxembourgish footballer
- Eric Veiga (1997): Luso-Luxembourgish footballer

== See also ==
- Portuguese in Belgium
- Portuguese in France
- Portuguese in Germany
- Portuguese in the Netherlands

== Sources ==
- Cordeiro, Albano (1976). Immigration – Luxembourg 1975: Aspects économiques, historiques et sociologiques (Report) (in French). Luxembourg City: Secrétariat d'État à l'Immigration.
