= 2017–18 Luxembourg Women's Cup =

Coupe des Dames

Tournament details
- Country: Luxembourg
- Dates: 13 September 2017 – 9 June 2018
- Teams: 33

Final positions
- Champions: Jeunesse Junglinster (6th title)
- Runners-up: Ell

Tournament statistics
- Matches played: 32

The 2017–18 Luxembourg Women's Cup was the seventeenth Luxembourg Women's Cup in football. The competition began on 13 September 2017 and the final was held on 9 June 2018. Jeunesse Junglinster won their sixth Luxembourg Women's Cup after defeating Ell 7–6 on penalties.

== Preliminary round ==
The match was played on 13 September 2017.

| Team 1 | Score | Team 2 |
|---|---|---|
| Union Mertert-Wasserbillig | 21–0 | US Rumelange |

== Round of 32 ==
The matches were played from 7 October 2017 to 15 October 2017.

| Team 1 | Score | Team 2 |
|---|---|---|
| Bettembourg | 7–4 | Itzig/Canach/CeBra |
| Racing Troisvierges | 0–3 w/o | Ell |
| Pratzerthal/Grevels | 0–3 w/o | FC Mamer 32 |
| Sporting Bertrange | 3–0 w/o | Hosingen/FF Norden |
| Union Mertert-Wasserbillig | 7–6 (a.e.t.) | Aspelt/Remich/Bous |
| Wincrange | 1–5 | Jeunesse Junglinster |
| Lintgen/Bissen | 0–9 | Wormeldange/Munsbach/CSG |
| Rupensia Lusitanos Larochette | 3–6 (a.e.t.) | Swift Hesperange |
| Red Star Merl-Belair | 0–6 | Fola Esch-Alzette |
| Steinsel/Walferdange | 0–4 | Aischdall |
| C Red Black Egalité 07 Pfaffenthal-Weimerskirch | 3–0 w/o | Wiltz 71 |
| Colmarberg | 1–4 | Racing FC Union Luxembourg |
| Differdange/Luna | 2–1 | Orania Vianden |
| Union Titus Pétange | 0–21 | Progrès Niederkorn |
| Kaerjeng/Rodange | 0–10 | Schifflange 95 |
| Young Boys Diekirch | 0–3 | Rosport/USBC/Christnach |

== Round of 16 ==
The matches were played on 20 March 2018 and 21 March 2018.

| Team 1 | Score | Team 2 |
|---|---|---|
| Swift Hesperange | 0–5 | Jeunesse Junglinster |
| C Red Black Egalité 07 Pfaffenthal-Weimerskirch | 0–10 | Schifflange 95 |
| Sporting Bertrange | 0–4 | Ell |
| FC Mamer 32 | 1–2 | Wormeldange/Munsbach/CSG |
| Differdange/Luna | 0–3 | Rosport/USBC/Christnach |
| Aischdall | 0–3 w/o | Fola Esch-Alzette |
| Union Mertert-Wasserbillig | 0–2 | Racing FC Union Luxembourg |
| Bettembourg | 6–0 | Progrès Niederkorn |

== Quarterfinals ==
The matches were played on 8 May 2018.

| Team 1 | Score | Team 2 |
|---|---|---|
| Fola Esch-Alzette | 1–1 (5–4 p) | Bettembourg |
| Jeunesse Junglinster | 5–2 | Schifflange 95 |
| Racing FC Union Luxembourg | 1–0 | Rosport/USBC/Christnach |
| Wormeldange/Munsbach/CSG | 1–3 | Ell |

== Semifinals ==
The matches were played on 2 June 2018.

| Team 1 | Score | Team 2 |
|---|---|---|
| Fola Esch-Alzette | 0–4 | Ell |
| Jeunesse Junglinster | 4–2 | Racing FC Union Luxembourg |

== Final ==
The final was played on 9 June 2018. Jeunesse Junglinster won the double after also winning the 2017–18 Dames Ligue 1.

9 June 2018
16:00

| Ell | 1–1 | Jeunesse Junglinster |
|---|---|---|
| Wegnez 4' | Report | Deda 33' |
Penalties
| Boly (penalty scored); Zinelli (penalty scored); Da Silva (penalty scored); Rodrigues (penalty scored); K. Thill (penalty scored); Wegnez (penalty scored); Ventura (penalty missed); Henkel (penalty missed) | 6–7 | (penalty scored) Alves; (penalty scored) Elias; (penalty scored) Tiberi; (penalty scored) Tangeten; (penalty scored) Birkel; (penalty scored) Miller; (penalty missed) Mendez; (penalty scored) Olivieri |

Stade Municipal, Rumelange
Attendance: 821
