= 2019 FIFA Women's World Cup qualification – UEFA preliminary round =

2019 women's FIFA prelims

The preliminary round of the European qualifying for the 2019 FIFA Women's World Cup consisted of the 16 lowest-ranked teams among the 46 entrants.

The 16 teams were drawn into four groups of four teams. Each group was played in a single round-robin format, where one of the teams was pre-selected as hosts, between 6 and 11 April 2017. The four group winners and the best runner-up (not counting results against the fourth-placed team) advanced to the qualifying group stage to join the 30 direct entrants.

Kazakhstan, Albania, Israel and the Faroe Islands advanced as group winners, and Moldova advanced as the best runner-up.

== Draw ==
The draw for the preliminary round was held on 19 January 2017, 13:30 CET (UTC+1), at the UEFA headquarters in Nyon, Switzerland.

The 16 teams were allocated into four seeding positions according to their coefficient ranking. They were drawn into four groups of four containing one team from each of the four seeding positions. First, the four teams pre-selected as hosts were drawn from their designated pot and allocated to their respective group as per their seeding positions. Next, the remaining 12 teams were drawn from their respective pot which were allocated according to their seeding positions.

Seeding position 1	Seeding position 2	Seeding position 3	Seeding position 4
Turkey; Israel; Greece; Kazakhstan	Estonia; Albania (H); Faroe Islands (H); Moldova	Malta; Montenegro; Georgia (H); Lithuania (H)	Latvia; Luxembourg; Andorra; Kosovo

- Teams which were pre-selected as preliminary round hosts are denoted by (H).

== Groups ==
The matches were played on 6, 8 and 11 April 2017.

Preliminary round schedule
Matchday	Date	Matches
Matchday 1	6 April 2017	1 v 3, 2 v 4
Matchday 2	8 April 2017	1 v 4, 3 v 2
Matchday 3	11 April 2017	2 v 1, 4 v 3

All times were CEST (UTC+2), as listed by UEFA (local times, if different, are in parentheses).

=== Group 1 ===
Pos	Team	Pld	W	D	L	GF	GA	GD	Pts	Qualification	Kazakhstan	Latvia	Georgia	Estonia
1	Kazakhstan	3	2	1	0	4	2	+2	7	Qualifying group stage	—	2–2	1–0	—
2	Latvia	3	1	2	0	7	3	+4	5		—	—	1–1	—
3	Georgia (H)	3	1	1	1	3	3	0	4		—	—	—	2–1
4	Estonia	3	0	0	3	1	7	−6	0		0–1	0–4	—	—

Source: UEFA
Rules for classification: Qualification tiebreakers
(H) Hosts
6 April 2017
12:00 (14:00 GET)

Estonia	0–4	Latvia
	Report	Fjodorova 37'; Spruntule 44'; Voitāne 62'; Ševcova 68'

Mikheil Meskhi Stadium-2, Tbilisi
Attendance: 100
Referee: Zuzana Kováčová (Slovakia)
6 April 2017
14:00 (16:00 GET)

Kazakhstan	1–0	Georgia
Nikolayenko 34'	Report

Mikheil Meskhi Stadium, Tbilisi
Attendance: 200
Referee: Eleni Lampadariou (Greece)

8 April 2017
12:00 (14:00 GET)

Kazakhstan	2–2	Latvia
Myasnikova 75', 85'	Report	Fjodorova 37'; Fedotova 64'

Mikheil Meskhi Stadium-2, Tbilisi
Attendance: 70
Referee: Ivana Projkovska (Macedonia)
8 April 2017
14:00 (16:00 GET)

Georgia	2–1	Estonia
Tchkonia 16'; Gabelia 22'	Report	Aarna 59'

Mikheil Meskhi Stadium, Tbilisi
Attendance: 200
Referee: Zuzana Kováčová (Slovakia)

11 April 2017
14:00 (16:00 GET)

Estonia	0–1	Kazakhstan
	Report	Nikolayenko 62'

Mikheil Meskhi Stadium-2, Tbilisi
Attendance: 50
Referee: Eleni Lampadariou (Greece)
11 April 2017
14:00 (16:00 GET)

Latvia	1–1	Georgia
Miksone 45'	Report	Danelia 19'

Mikheil Meskhi Stadium, Tbilisi
Attendance: 100
Referee: Ivana Projkovska (Macedonia)

=== Group 2 ===
Pos	Team	Pld	W	D	L	GF	GA	GD	Pts	Qualification	Albania	Greece	Malta	Kosovo
1	Albania (H)	3	2	1	0	5	3	+2	7	Qualifying group stage	—	2–1	—	3–2
2	Greece	3	2	0	1	8	2	+6	6		—	—	1–0	6–0
3	Malta	3	1	1	1	3	2	+1	4		0–0	—	—	—
4	Kosovo	3	0	0	3	3	12	−9	0		—	—	1–3	—

Source: UEFA
Rules for classification: Qualification tiebreakers
(H) Hosts
6 April 2017
12:00

Albania	3–2	Kosovo
Bajraktari 17'; Velaj 75'; Musa 90+6' (o.g.)	Report	Rexha 35', 59'

Elbasan Arena, Elbasan
Attendance: 1,500
Referee: Lorraine Clark (Scotland)
6 April 2017
14:00

Greece	1–0	Malta
Papadopoulou 18'	Report

Selman Stërmasi Stadium, Tirana
Attendance: 100
Referee: Lina Lehtovaara (Finland)

8 April 2017
12:00

Greece	6–0	Kosovo
Markou 33'; Chatzigiannidou 39'; Kakambouki 51'; Nati 57'; Kongouli 76'; Sidira 82'	Report

Selman Stërmasi Stadium, Tirana
Attendance: 100
Referee: Amy Rayner (England)
8 April 2017
14:00

Malta	0–0	Albania
	Report

Elbasan Arena, Elbasan
Attendance: 300
Referee: Lorraine Clark (Scotland)

11 April 2017
14:00

Albania	2–1	Greece
Doci 16'; Velaj 90'	Report	Nati 18'

Elbasan Arena, Elbasan
Attendance: 4,000
Referee: Lina Lehtovaara (Finland)
11 April 2017
14:00

Kosovo	1–3	Malta
Shala 80'	Report	Cuschieri 12'; Flask 27'; Theuma 38'

Selman Stërmasi Stadium, Tirana
Attendance: 100
Referee: Amy Rayner (England)

=== Group 3 ===
Pos	Team	Pld	W	D	L	GF	GA	GD	Pts	Qualification	Israel	Moldova	Lithuania	Andorra
1	Israel	3	2	1	0	9	0	+9	7	Qualifying group stage	—	—	2–0	7–0
2	Moldova	3	2	1	0	6	0	+6	7	Qualifying group stage	0–0	—	—	4–0
3	Lithuania (H)	3	1	0	2	2	4	−2	3		—	0–2	—	—
4	Andorra	3	0	0	3	0	13	−13	0		—	—	0–2	—

Source: UEFA
Rules for classification: Qualification tiebreakers
(H) Hosts
6 April 2017
13:00 (14:00 EEST)

Moldova	4–0	Andorra
Chiper 9'; Cerescu 41'; Munteanu 45' (pen.); Colesnicenco 71'	Report

LFF Stadium, Vilnius
Attendance: 20
Referee: Marte Sørø (Norway)
6 April 2017
17:30 (18:30 EEST)

Israel	2–0	Lithuania
Awad 77'; Falkon 90'	Report

LFF Stadium, Vilnius
Attendance: 350
Referee: Sofia Karagiorgi (Cyprus)

8 April 2017
13:00 (14:00 EEST)

Lithuania	0–2	Moldova
	Report	Mikutaitė 90+2' (o.g.); Țabur 90+3'

LFF Stadium, Vilnius
Attendance: 200
Referee: Marte Sørø (Norway)
8 April 2017
17:30 (18:30 EEST)

Israel	7–0	Andorra
Shahaf 15', 37'; Tizón 29' (o.g.); Rogers 34'; D. Sofer 45+1' (pen.), 47'; Sendel 62' (pen.)	Report

LFF Stadium, Vilnius
Attendance: 10
Referee: Barbara Poxhofer (Austria)

11 April 2017
14:00 (15:00 EEST)

Moldova	0–0	Israel
	Report

LFF Stadium, Vilnius
Attendance: 10
Referee: Sofia Karagiorgi (Cyprus)
11 April 2017
14:00 (15:00 EEST)

Andorra	0–2	Lithuania
	Report	Kyžaitė 49'; Vaičiulaitytė 90+2'

National Football Academy Stadium, Kaunas
Attendance: 108
Referee: Barbara Poxhofer (Austria)

=== Group 4 ===
Pos	Team	Pld	W	D	L	GF	GA	GD	Pts	Qualification	Faroe Islands	Turkey	Montenegro	Luxembourg
1	Faroe Islands (H)	3	3	0	0	9	3	+6	9	Qualifying group stage	—	2–1	—	5–1
2	Turkey	3	2	0	1	13	3	+10	6		—	—	3–0	9–1
3	Montenegro	3	1	0	2	8	6	+2	3		1–2	—	—	—
4	Luxembourg	3	0	0	3	3	21	−18	0		—	—	1–7	—

Source: UEFA
Rules for classification: Qualification tiebreakers
(H) Hosts
6 April 2017
16:00 (15:00 WEST)

Turkey	3–0	Montenegro
Topçu 15', 39'; Altunkulak 28'	Report

Tórsvøllur, Tórshavn
Attendance: 55
Referee: Eszter Urban (Hungary)
6 April 2017
20:30 (19:30 WEST)

Faroe Islands	5–1	Luxembourg
H. Sevdal 7', 64'; Klakstein 18'; Á. Johannesen 37'; Arge 54'	Report	Birkel 88'

Tórsvøllur, Tórshavn
Attendance: 195
Referee: Petra Chudá (Slovakia)

8 April 2017
16:00 (15:00 WEST)

Montenegro	1–2	Faroe Islands
Kuč 65'	Report	Klakstein 78'; Nielsen 80'

Tórsvøllur, Tórshavn
Attendance: 210
Referee: Petra Chudá (Slovakia)
8 April 2017
20:30 (19:30 WEST)

Turkey	9–1	Luxembourg
Topçu 10'; Pekel 17', 51', 70'; Elias 40' (o.g.); Altunkulak 57', 75', 86'; Karagenç 90+3'	Report	De Lemos 58'

Tórsvøllur, Tórshavn
Attendance: 45
Referee: Sarah Garratt (England)

11 April 2017
14:00 (13:00 WEST)

Faroe Islands	2–1	Turkey
Andreasen 36'; Simonsen 64'	Report	Pekel 17'

Tórsvøllur, Tórshavn
Attendance: 1,450
Referee: Eszter Urban (Hungary)
11 April 2017
14:00 (13:00 WEST)

Luxembourg	1–7	Montenegro
De Lemos 80'	Report	Bulatović 5', 27'; Djoković 35', 45+5'; Pavičević 48'; Kuč 50', 56'

Gundadalur, Tórshavn
Attendance: 10
Referee: Sarah Garratt (England)

== Ranking of second-placed teams ==
To determine the best second-placed teams from the preliminary round which advance to the qualifying group stage, only the results of the second-placed teams against the first and third-placed teams in their group are taken into account, while results against the fourth-placed team are not included. As a result, two matches played by each second-placed team count for the purposes of determining the ranking.

Pos	Grp	Team	Pld	W	D	L	GF	GA	GD	Pts	Qualification
1	3	Moldova	2	1	1	0	2	0	+2	4	Qualifying group stage
2	4	Turkey	2	1	0	1	4	2	+2	3	
3	2	Greece	2	1	0	1	2	2	0	3	
4	1	Latvia	2	0	2	0	3	3	0	2	

Source: UEFA
Rules for classification: 1) points; 2) goal difference; 3) goals scored; 4) disciplinary points; 5) coefficient.

== Goalscorers ==
There were 84 goals scored in 24 matches, for an average of 3.5 goals per match.

4 goals

- (Turkey) Selen Altunkulak
- (Turkey) Melike Pekel

3 goals

- (Montenegro) Armisa Kuč
- (Turkey) Ebru Topçu

2 goals

- (Albania) Furtuna Velaj
- (Faroe Islands) Eyðvør Klakstein
- (Faroe Islands) Heidi Sevdal
- (Greece) Sofia Nati
- (Israel) Arava Shahaf
- (Israel) Daniel Sofer
- (Kazakhstan) Yulia Myasnikova
- (Kazakhstan) Yuliya Nikolayenko
- (Kosovo) Agnesa Rexha
- (Montenegro) Slađana Bulatović
- (Montenegro) Jasna Djoković
- (Latvia) Anastasija Fjodorova
- (Luxembourg) Gabriela De Lemos

1 goal

- (Albania) Arbiona Bajraktari
- (Albania) Megi Doci
- (Estonia) Signy Aarna
- (Faroe Islands) Rannvá Andreasen
- (Faroe Islands) Lív Arge
- (Faroe Islands) Ásla Johannesen
- (Faroe Islands) Birita Nielsen
- (Faroe Islands) Milja Simonsen
- (Georgia (country)) Mariam Danelia
- (Georgia (country)) Gulnara Gabelia
- (Georgia (country)) Khatia Tchkonia
- (Greece) Natalia Chatzigiannidou
- (Greece) Eleni Kakambouki
- (Greece) Sofia Kongouli
- (Greece) Eleni Markou
- (Greece) Anastasia Papadopoulou
- (Greece) Danai-Eleni Sidira
- (Israel) Marian Awad
- (Israel) Lee Falkon
- (Israel) Linoy Rogers
- (Israel) Karin Sendel
- (Kosovo) Blerta Shala
- (Latvia) Renāte Fedotova
- (Latvia) Karlīna Miksone
- (Latvia) Olga Ševcova
- (Latvia) Elīza Spruntule
- (Latvia) Sandra Voitāne
- (Lithuania) Anika Kyžaitė
- (Lithuania) Kamilė Vaičiulaitytė
- (Luxembourg) Jessica Birkel
- (Malta) Rachel Cuschieri
- (Malta) Jade Flask
- (Malta) Dorianne Theuma
- (Moldova) Cristina Cerescu
- (Moldova) Claudia Chiper
- (Moldova) Nadejda Colesnicenco
- (Moldova) Natalia Munteanu
- (Moldova) Carolina Țabur
- (Montenegro) Jadranka Pavičević
- (Turkey) Didem Karagenç

1 own goal

- (Andorra) Miriam Tizón (playing against Israel)
- (Kosovo) Blerina Musa (playing against Albania)
- (Lithuania) Algimante Mikutaitė (playing against Moldova)
- (Luxembourg) Sarah Elias (playing against Turkey)
