= Ricardo Marques (politician) =

Luxembourgish politician

The Honourable Ricardo Marques
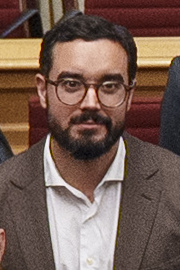
- Marques in 2026

Member of the Chamber of Deputies
- Incumbent
- Assumed office 10 October 2024
- Preceded by: Max Hengel
- Constituency: East

Personal details
- Born: 26 April 1993 (age 32) Ettelbruck, Luxembourg
- Party: Christian Social People's Party

Ricardo Marques (born 26 April 1993) is a Luxembourgish politician of the Christian Social People's Party (CSV). He has served as a member of the Chamber of Deputies for the East constituency since October 2024, replacing Max Hengel following the latter's death. He has also served on the communal council of Echternach since 2017.

He is the third Luxembourger of Portuguese descent to enter the Chamber of Deputies, after Félix and Liz Braz, and the first from the CSV.
