= 2018–19 Luxembourg Women's Cup =

Coupe des Dames

Tournament details
- Country: Luxembourg
- Dates: 13 October 2018 – 1 June 2019
- Teams: 30

Final positions
- Champions: Racing FC Union Luxembourg (1st title)
- Runners-up: Wormeldange/Munsbach/CSG

The 2018–19 Luxembourg Women's Cup was the eighteenth Luxembourg Women's Cup in football. The competition began on 13 October 2018 and the final was held on 1 June 2019. Racing won their first Luxembourg Women's Cup after defeating Wormeldange/Munsbach/CSG 4–0.

== Preliminary round ==
The matches were played on 13 October 2018.

Team 1	Score	Team 2
Wiltz 71	0–26	Wormeldange/Munsbach/CSG
Sporting Bertrange	2–5	Swift Hesperange
Red Star Merl-Belair	1–2	Atert Bissen
Union Mertert-Wasserbillig	2–0	Young Boys Diekirch
Rosport/USBC/Christnach	1–2	Progrès Niederkorn
Union Titus Pétange	1–4	Pratzerthal/Grevels
Red Black Egalité 07 Pfaffenthal-Weimerskirch	1–2	Aspelt/Remich/Bous
Orania Vianden	0–5	Mamer 32
Uelzechtdall	0–4	Schifflange 95
Rumelange	2–6	Differdange/Luna
Bettembourg	3–0 w/o	Wincrange
Fola Esch-Alzette	0–2	Itzig/CeBra
Kaerjeng/Rodange	0–6	Rupensia Lusitanos Larochette
Hosingen/Norden	0–8	Ell

== Round of 16 ==
The matches were played on 8 December 2018 and 11 December 2018.

Team 1	Score	Team 2
Atert Bissen	0–3 w/o	Jeunesse Junglinster
Union Mertert-Wasserbillig	3–0 w/o	Schifflange 95
Wormeldange/Munsbach/CSG	3–1	Itzig/CeBra
Pratzerthal/Grevels	0–8	Ell
Differdange/Luna	0–9	Racing FC Union Luxembourg
Swift Hesperange	0–4	Mamer 32
Aspelt/Remich/Bous	1–9	Progrès Niederkorn
Rupensia Lusitanos Larochette	1–11	Bettembourg

== Quarterfinals ==
The matches were played on 20 April 2019 and 1 May 2019.

Team 1	Score	Team 2
Mertert-Wasserbillig	0–6	Mamer 32
Wormeldange/Munsbach/CSG	2–0	Ell
Progrès Niederkorn	0–1	Jeunesse Junglinster
Racing FC Union Luxembourg	1–0	Bettembourg

== Semifinals ==
The matches were played on 15 May 2019.

Team 1	Score	Team 2
Racing FC Union Luxembourg	5–1	Jeunesse Junglinster
Wormeldange/Munsbach/CSG	3–1	Mamer 32

== Final ==
The final was played on 1 June 2019.

1 June 2019
16:00

Racing FC Union Luxembourg	4–0	Wormeldange/Munsbach/CSG
Martins 5', 38'; Cherkane 81'; Courbin 85'	Report

Stade Alphonse Theis, Hesperange
Attendance: 930
Referee: Inacio Victor

Match officials

- Assistant referees:
  - Vakil Shania
  - Vaz Leite Bruno Tiago
- Fourth official: Thomas Loïc
