= Kate Thill =

Luxembourgish footballer

Personal information
- Date of birth: 25 January 2002 (age 24)
- Place of birth: Goetzingen, Luxembourg
- Height: 1.80 m (5 ft 11 in)
- Position: Forward

College career
| Years | Team | Apps | (Gls) |
| 2021–2024 | Bridgeport Purple Knights | 60 | (34) |
| 2024–2025 | Kent State Golden Flashes | 17 | (0) |

Senior career*
| Years | Team | Apps | (Gls) |
| 2017–2018 | Ell | 14 | (28) |
| 2018–2024 | Bettembourg | 52 | (96) |

International career^{‡}
| 2018–2022 | Luxembourg | 10 | (1) |
- * Club domestic league appearances and goals as of 8 June 2026 ‡ National team caps and goals as of 20 June 2022

Kate Thill (born 25 January 2002) is a Luxembourgish footballer who plays as a forward and was capped by the Luxembourg women's national team. She plays for TuS Issel since 2026/2027.

== International goals ==
| # | Date | Venue | Opponent | Score | Result | Competition |
|---|---|---|---|---|---|---|
| 1. | 26 October 2021 | SRC Biljanini Izvori, Ohrid, North Macedonia | North Macedonia | 3–1 | 3–2 | 2023 FIFA World Cup qualification |
