= Luxembourg women's national football team results =

- Win Draw Loss

For lists of Luxembourg women's national football team results see:

- Luxembourg women's national football team results (2000–2019)
- Luxembourg women's national football team results (2020–present)
