= Hengel =

Hengel, Van Hengel or Van den Hengel, is a surname that may refer to:

- Dave Hengel (born 1961), an American Major League Baseball outfielder
- Drusilla van Hengel (born 1963), an American sprint canoer
- Ed Hengel (1855–1927), an American Major League Baseball manager
- Guy Vanhengel (born 1958), a Belgian politician
- Hartmut Hengel (* 1960), a German physician and university professor
- John van Hengel (1923–2005), an American founder of food banking; related to Geert Schutte van Hengel
- Laura van den Hengel (born 1991), Dutch racing driver
- Maarten van Hengel (1920s–2006)
- Maarten R. van Hengel (born 1953), an American Financial Executive
- Martin Hengel (1926–2009), a German Protestant theologian
- Max Hengel (1977–2024), a Luxembourgish politician, member of the Chamber
- René Hengel (1928–2012), a Luxembourgish politician
- Theo van Hengel (1875–1939), a Dutch naval officer and inventor
- Wessel Albertus van Hengel (1779–1871), a Dutch theologian
- Willi van Hengel (* 1963), a German writer and editor.

== See also ==
- Hängel
- Hengl
