= Marie-Amélie Albrand =

Luxembourgish footballer (born 1997)

Personal information
- Date of birth: 5 November 1997 (age 29)
- Position: Defender

Team information
- Current team: Racing

Senior career*
Years	Team	Apps	(Gls)
2015–2020	Bettembourg	25	(8)
2020–2023	Racing	4	(0)

International career^{‡}
2016–2019	Luxembourg	8	(0)
- * Club domestic league appearances and goals as of 31 May 2024 ‡ National team caps and goals as of 10 June 2023

Marie-Amélie Albrand (born 5 November 1997) is a Luxembourgish footballer who played as a defender and appeared for the Luxembourg women's national team.

== Career ==
Albrand has been capped for the Luxembourg national team, appearing for the team during the 2019 FIFA Women's World Cup qualifying cycle.
