= SC Bettembourg Féminine =

Women's association football club in Luxembourg

SC Bettembourg
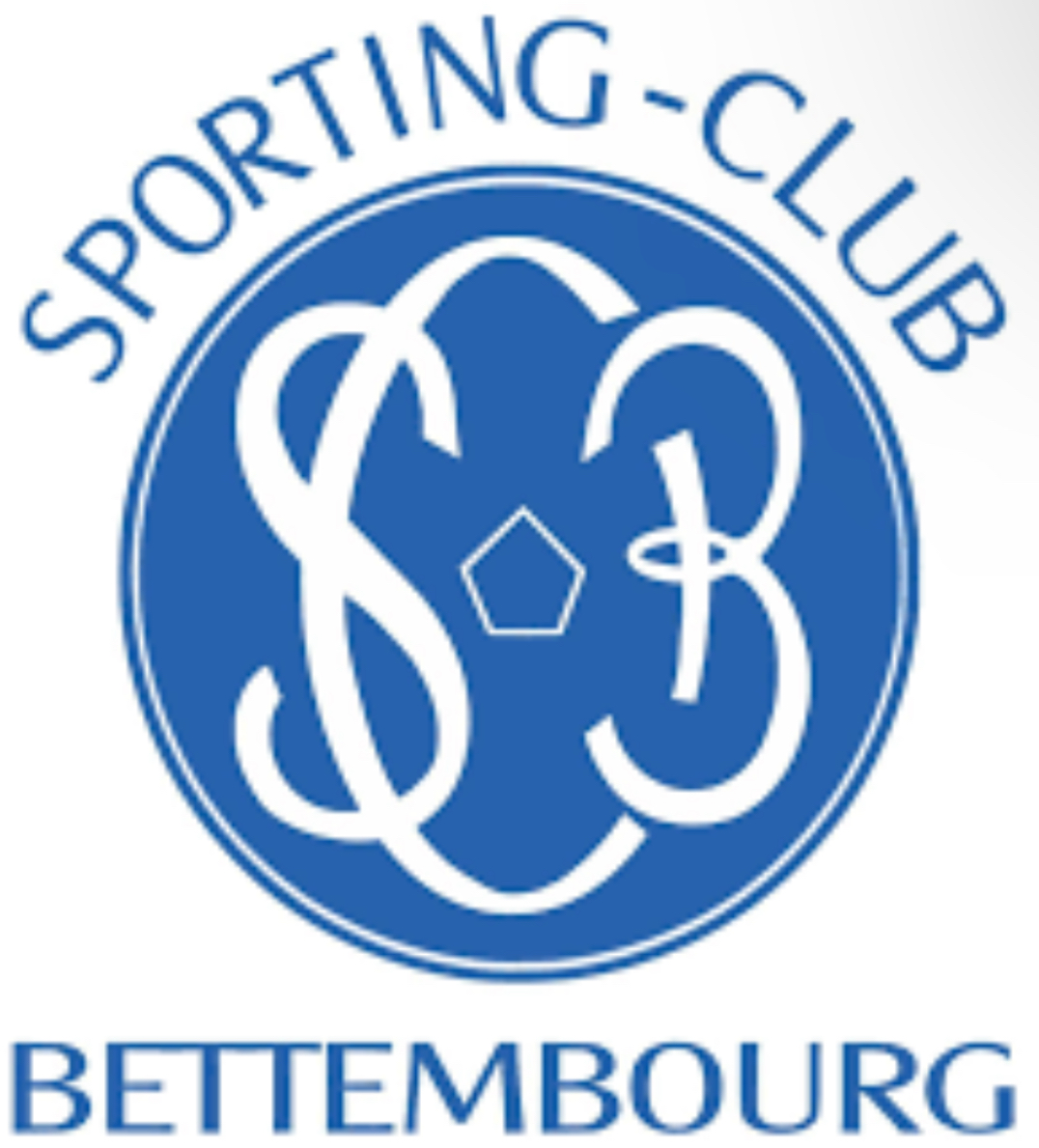
- Full name: Sporting Club Bettembourg
- Founded: 2012; 14 years ago
- Ground: Terrain 1, Bettembourg
- Capacity: 1,000
- President: Patrick Hutmacher
- Manager: Olivier Gilson
- League: Ligue 1
- 2025–26: Ligue 1, 5th of 10
- Website: https://www.sc-bettembourg.com/
Home colours	Away colours

SC Bettembourg is a Luxembourgish women's football club based in Bettembourg, Luxembourg. The men's club was founded in 1908, however the women's section has been in existence since 2012. The club plays in Ligue 1, the top tier of women's football in Luxembourg. A second women's team was introduced in 2014 and they currently play in the second tier Ligue 2. The team's colours are blue and white.

SC Bettembourg plays its home matches at Terrain 1 Bettembourg, a 1,000-capacity stadium that is situated in Bettembourg.

== History ==
SC Bettembourg has been running a men's team since 1908, but it wasn't until 2012 when the women's team was introduced. They began in Division 3 and quickly rose up the rankings. In their inaugural season, the women's team won promotion into the second division, then in the 2013–14 season SC Bettembourg won promotion into Division 1 as well as launching a second women's team.

In their first season in the top flight in the 2014–15 season, SC Bettembourg finished in second place only by goal difference – tied on points with Jeunesse Junglinster. SC Bettembourg's 15 year old attacker Karen Marin won player of the season. The team also finished second in the 2015–16 season, as well as finishing runners-up in the Women's Cup. After successive second places, in the 2016–17 season finally bettered their adversaries Jeunesse Junglinster by winning their first league title by a comfortable 6 points and thus qualifying for their first ever Women's Champions League.

SC Bettembourg did not fare well in the 2017–18 Women's Champions League qualifying round, losing their first match 0–8 to PAOK and not scoring a goal in two further defeats.

The team won their second league title out of just five top-flight seasons in the 2018–19 season and once again qualified for the Women's Champions League. Despite another thrashing in their first game of the 2019–20 edition, losing 0–12 to FC Minsk, SC Bettembourg scored their first Champions League goals in a 2–7 defeat to Split, with Kate Thill scoring both.

=== Current squad ===
As of 15 August 2022

Note: Flags indicate national team as defined under FIFA eligibility rules; some limited exceptions apply. Players may hold more than one non-FIFA nationality.

No.	Pos.	Nation	Player
1	GK	LUX	Lena Krier
3	DF	LUX	Bisa Ceman
4	FW	LUX	Sabrina Dukovski
5	DF	LUX	Kim Simone Ney
6	MF	LUX	Sarah Witry
7	MF	LUX	Karen Marin
8	MF	LUX	Léa Pizzimenti
9	DF	LUX	Sadine Correia
11	FW	LUX	Anouchka Besch
12	MF	POR	Joana Simões Pereira
14	FW	FRA	Lucia Ruiz
16	DF	GER	Kim Nilles
17	MF	FRA	Stessy Musselek

No.	Pos.	Nation	Player
18	DF	LUX	Marie-Amélie Albrand
19	DF	LUX	Luana Tosti
20	FW	LUX	Kate Thill
21	DF	LUX	Sheila Hoja
21	MF	FRA	Océane Testard
23	DF	POR	Nancy Serrano
25	MF	FRA	Justine Oswald
29	DF	LUX	Tamara Aniset
31	MF	LUX	Senada Ceman
77	MF	LUX	Melissa Teixeira Muacho
88	FW	LUX	Amenis Correia
-	MF	POR	Rita Garcia
-	MF	POR	Marta Pires

== Honours ==
- Dames Ligue 1
  - Winners (2): 2016–17, 2018–19
  - Runners-up: 2014–15, 2015–16, 2017–18
- Luxembourg Women's Cup
  - Runners-up: 2015–16

== Record in UEFA Women's Champions League ==
=== Summary ===
Pld	W	D	L	GF	GA	Last season played
6	0	0	6	2	38	2019–20

=== By season ===
Season	Round	Opponent	Home	Away	Agg
2017–18	Qualifying round	(Greece) PAOK	0–8		4th of 4
2017–18	Qualifying round	(Bosnia and Herzegovina) SFK 2000	0–3		4th of 4
2017–18	Qualifying round	(Albania) Vllaznia	0–2		4th of 4
2019–20	Qualifying round	(Belarus) FC Minsk	0–12		4th of 4
2019–20	Qualifying round	(Ukraine) Zhytlobud-1 Kharkiv	0–6		4th of 4
2019–20	Qualifying round	(Croatia) Split	2–7		4th of 4
