= Luxembourg Women's Cup =

Association football tournament in Luxembourg

Coupe des Dames
- Founded: 2001
- Region: Luxembourg
- Teams: 36 (2014–15)
- Current champions: Racing Union (5th title)
- Most championships: Mamer 32; Jeunesse Junglinster (6 titles)
- Website: Official site (in French)

The Luxembourg Women's Cup is the annual cup competition of women's football teams in Luxembourg. It was first contested in 2001/02 and is held by the Luxembourg Football Federation.

== List of finals ==
The list of finals:

Season	Champion	Result	Runner-up
2001–02	Progrès Niederkorn	12–0	Etzella Ettelbruck
2002–03	Progrès Niederkorn	3–1	Etzella Ettelbruck
2003–04	Etzella Ettelbruck	4–3	Progrès Niederkorn
2004–05	Mamer 32	2–2 (a.e.t.) (5–3 p)	Progrès Niederkorn
2005–06	Mamer 32	6–1	FC CeBra 01
2006–07	Mamer 32	11–1	FC CeBra 01
2007–08	Mamer 32	3–1	Union of Blo Waiss Itzig and Racing Union
2008–09	Mamer 32	4–2	Jeunesse Junglinster
2009–10	Jeunesse Junglinster	2–0	Minerva Lingten
2010–11	Jeunesse Junglinster	3–0	Progrès Niederkorn
2011–12	SC Ell	1–1 (5–2 p)	Progrès Niederkorn
2012–13	Jeunesse Junglinster	8–1	Progrès Niederkorn
2013–14	Union of Jeunesse Canach and URB	4–0	SC Ell
2014–15	Jeunesse Junglinster	1–1 (a.e.t.) (12–11 p)	Racing Union
2015–16	Jeunesse Junglinster	1–1 (a.e.t.); 6–5 (p)	SC Bettembourg
2016–17	Mamer 32	4–1	Union of Victoria Rosport, Berdorf-Consdorf and Chirstnach
2017–18	Jeunesse Junglinster	1–1 (a.e.t.) (7–6 p)	SC Ell
2018–19	Racing Union	4–0	Union of Wormeldange, Munsbach and CS Grevenmacher
2019–20	Cancelled due to the COVID-19 pandemic		
2020–21	Cancelled due to the COVID-19 pandemic		
2022–23	Racing Union	3–2	Mamer 32
2023–24	Racing Union	3–0	SC Ell
2024–25	Racing Union	4–0	Mamer 32
2025–26	Racing Union	3–1	Differdange 03

== Performance by club ==
Club	Titles	Runners-up	Years won
Mamer 32	6	2	2004–05, 2005–06, 2006–07, 2007–08, 2008–09, 2016–17
Jeunesse Junglinster	6	1	2009–10, 2010–11, 2012–13, 2014–15, 2015–16, 2017–18
Racing Union	5	1	2018–19, 2022–23, 2023–24, 2024–25, 2025–26
Progrès Niederkorn	2	5	2001–02, 2002–03
Etzella Ettelbruck	1	2	2003–04
SC Ell	1	3	2011–12
Union of Jeunesse Canach and URB	1	-	2013–14
FC CeBra 01	-	2	
Union of Blo Waiss Itzig and Racing Union	-	1	
Minerva Lintgen	-	1	
SC Bettembourg	-	1	
Union of Victoria Rosport, Berdorf-Consdorf and Chirstnach	-	1	
Union of Wormeldange, Munsbach and CS Grevenmacher	-	1	
Differdange 03	-	1	
