= Cathy Da Silva Sousa =

Luxembourgish footballer

Personal information
- Date of birth: 27 September 1994 (age 32)
- Position: Forward

Team information
- Current team: Mamer 32

Senior career*
Years	Team	Apps	(Gls)
2019–2024	Bettembourg	55	(34)
2024–	Mamer 32	26	(5)

International career^{‡}
2018–2019	Luxembourg	6	(2)
- * Club domestic league appearances and goals as of 8 June 2026 ‡ National team caps and goals as of 10 August 2021

Cathy Da Silva Sousa (born 27 September 1994) is a Luxembourgish footballer who plays as a forward for Dames Ligue 1 club Mamer 32 and formerly the Luxembourg women's national team.

== International career ==
Da Silva Sousa made her senior debut for Luxembourg on 3 March 2018 during a 1–7 friendly loss to Morocco.
