= Michał Augustyn =

Polish footballer (born 1991)

Personal information
- Date of birth: 13 April 1991 (age 35)
- Place of birth: Wolsztyn, Poland
- Height: 1.84 m (6 ft 0 in)
- Position: Goalkeeper

Youth career
- –2007: Grom Wolsztyn
- 2009: Polonia Bytom

Senior career*
Years	Team	Apps	(Gls)
2007–2008	Grom Wolsztyn		
2008	Sokół Rakoniewice		
2009–2010	Polonia Bytom		
2010–2011	Ilanka Rzepin	26	(0)
2011–2013	Chrobry Głogów	37	(0)
2014–2015	FC 47 Bastendorf		
2015–2016	CS Grevenmacher	33	(0)
2017–2018	Union Mertert-Wasserbillig	24	(0)
2018–2019	FC 47 Bastendorf		
2019–2020	FC Victoria Rosport		
2020–2022	US Hostert	17	(0)
2022–2023	Jeunesse Junglinster		
- * Club domestic league appearances and goals

Michał Augustyn (born 13 APril 1991) is a Polish former professional footballer who played as a goalkeeper.

== Early life ==
Augustyn completed his studies in 2013. He is a native of Wolsztyn, Poland.

== Career ==
Augustyn started his senior career with Grom Wolsztyn in the regional league. In 2010, he moved to Ilanka Rzepin. In 2011, he signed for Polish side Chrobry Głogów, where he made 37 II liga appearances before leaving in 2013. Shortly after, he moved to Luxembourg to look for work. In 2014, he resumed his career and joined Luxembourgish side FC 47 Bastendorf, before signing with CS Grevenmacher for the 2015–16 season. He was nominated for 2015–16 League Goalkeeper of the Season while playing for the club. In 2017, Augustyn moved to Union Mertert-Wasserbillig. He was initially described as "returning from a serious injury and [...] in improving form" while at Union. He spent a year with FC Victoria Rosport before moving to US Hostert in 2020.

== Personal life ==
In 2013, Augustyn began working in the financial industry. He is married to a Colombian woman; the pair currently lives in New York City, United States.
