= Luxembourg Women's Ligue 1 =

Association football league in Luxembourg

- Founded: 1972
- Country: Luxembourg
- Confederation: UEFA
- Number of clubs: 10
- Level on pyramid: 1
- Domestic cup: Luxembourg Women's Cup
- International cup: UEFA Champions League
- Current champions: Racing Union (2025–26)
- Most championships: Progrès Niederkorn (16 titles)
- Website: FLF.lu

The Dames Ligue 1 (Women's League 1) is Luxembourg's top level women's football league.

The league featured a different number of teams through the years (usually eight or ten) and since 2023–24 has featured 10 teams that play each other twice to decide the champion.

The champion qualifies for a spot in the UEFA Women's Champions League. However, between the 2001–02 and 2018–19 editions, the champion was only entered 4 times (out of 18 editions). It has only been since 2019–20 that the champion has competed in every season.

== Current teams ==
The following 10 teams are competing in the 2025–26 season:

- Racing FC
- Differdange 03
- Swift Hesperange
- Bettembourg
- SC Ell
- Mamer 32
- Young Boys Diekirch
- Kehlen
- Union "Red Black Red Star Luxembourg"
  - Red Black Luxembourg
  - Red Star Merl-Belair
- Union "Osten"
  - Union Mertert-Wasserbillig
  - Grevenmacher
  - Jeunesse Biwer
  - Victoria Rosport

== Champions ==
Season	Winner	Runner-up
1972–73	Atert Bissen	Racing Rodange
1973–74	Atert Bissen	Progrès Niederkorn
1974–75	Progrès Niederkorn	Atert Bissen
1975–76	Mondercange	Atert Bissen
1976–77	Progrès Niederkorn	SC Bettembourg
1977–78	Progrès Niederkorn	Atert Bissen
1978–79 to 1983–84	Not held	
1984–85	Progrès Niederkorn	
1985–86	Progrès Niederkorn	
1986–87	Progrès Niederkorn	
1987–88	Progrès Niederkorn	
1988–89	Progrès Niederkorn	
1989–90 to 1996–97	Not held	
1997–98	F91 Dudelange	US Rumelange
1998–99	Progrès Niederkorn	US Rumelange
1999–00	Progrès Niederkorn	US Rumelange
2000–01	Progrès Niederkorn	US Rumelange
2001–02	Progrès Niederkorn	US Rumelange
2002–03	Progrès Niederkorn	Etzella Ettelbruck
2003–04	Progrès Niederkorn	Etzella Ettelbruck
2004–05	Progrès Niederkorn	Mamer 32
2005–06	Mamer 32	Etzella Ettelbruck
2006–07	Mamer 32	Etzella Ettelbruck
2007–08	Mamer 32	Blo Waiss Itzig
2008–09	Mamer 32	Jeunesse Junglinster
2009–10	Jeunesse Junglinster	Mamer 32
2010–11	Progrès Niederkorn	Jeunesse Junglinster
2011–12	Jeunesse Junglinster	Progrès Niederkorn
2012–13	Jeunesse Junglinster	SC Ell
2013–14	SC Ell	Progrès Niederkorn
2014–15	Jeunesse Junglinster	SC Bettembourg
2015–16	Jeunesse Junglinster	SC Bettembourg
2016–17	SC Bettembourg	Jeunesse Junglinster
2017–18	Jeunesse Junglinster	SC Bettembourg
2018–19	SC Bettembourg	Racing Union
2019–20	Abandoned due to COVID-19	
2020–21	Racing Union	SC Bettembourg
2021–22	Racing Union	Mamer 32
2022–23	Racing Union	Mamer 32
2023–24	Racing Union	Swift Hesperange
2024–25	Racing Union	Swift Hesperange
2025–26	Racing Union	Differdange 03

== Performance by club ==
Teams in bold are still playing in the Dames Ligue 1. Teams in italics no longer exist.

Club	Titles	Runners-up	Years won
Progrès Niederkorn	16	3	1974–75, 1976–77, 1977–78, 1984–85, 1985–86, 1986–87, 1987–88, 1988–89, 1998–99, 1999–2000, 2000–01, 2001–02, 2002–03, 2003–04, 2004–05, 2010–11
**Jeunesse Junglinster**	6	3	2009–10, 2011–12, 2012–13, 2014–15, 2015–16, 2017–18
**Racing Union**	6	1	2020–21, 2021–22, 2022–23, 2023–24, 2024–25, 2025–26
**Mamer 32**	4	4	2005–06, 2006–07, 2007–08, 2008–09
**Bettembourg**	2	5	2016–17, 2018–19
Atert Bissen	2	3	1972–73, 1973–74
**SC Ell**	1	1	2013–14
Mondercange	1	-	1975–76
F91 Dudelange	1	-	1997–98
US Rumelange	-	5	
Etzella Ettelbruck	-	4	
**Swift Hesperange**	-	2	
Racing Rodange	-	1	
Blo Waiss Itzig	-	1	
**Differdange 03**	-	1	
