= Sam Tanson =

Luxembourgish lawyer and politician

The Honourable Sam Tanson
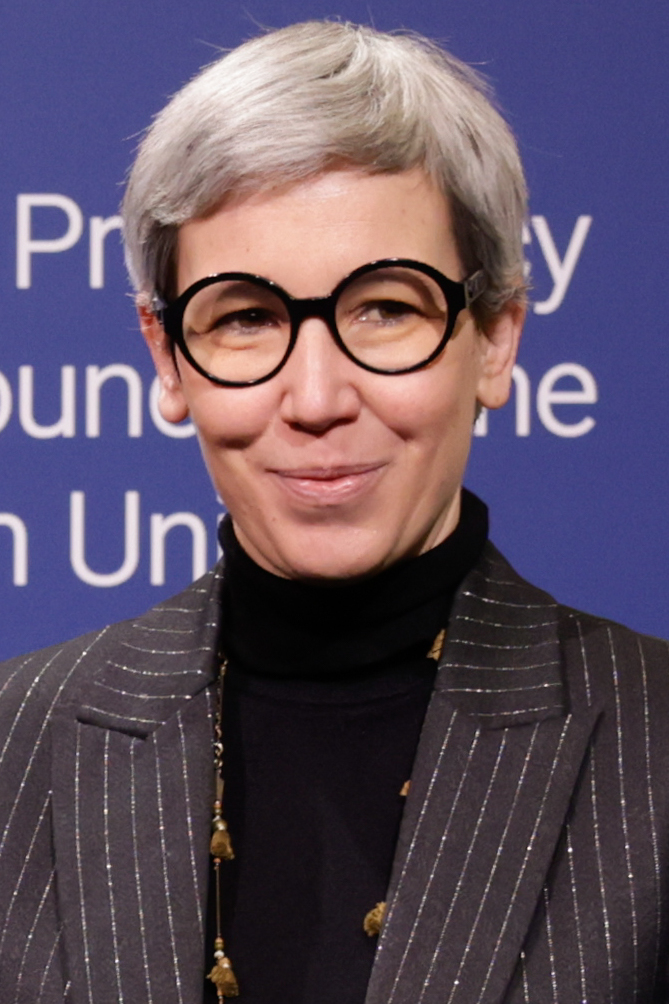
- Tanson in 2022

Member of the Chamber of Deputies of Luxembourg
- Incumbent
- Assumed office 21 November 2023
- Constituency: Centre
- In office 17 April 2018 – 5 December 2018
- Preceded by: Roberto Traversini
- Constituency: Centre

Minister for Justice
- In office 6 September 2019 – 17 November 2023
- Prime Minister: Xavier Bettel
- Preceded by: Félix Braz
- Succeeded by: Elisabeth Margue

Minister for Culture
- In office 5 December 2018 – 17 November 2023
- Prime Minister: Xavier Bettel
- Preceded by: Xavier Bettel
- Succeeded by: Eric Thill

Minister of Housing
- In office 5 December 2018 – 11 October 2019
- Prime Minister: Xavier Bettel
- Preceded by: Marc Hansen
- Succeeded by: Henri Kox

Chief Alderwoman of Luxembourg City
- In office 17 December 2013 – 22 November 2017
- Mayor: Lydie Polfer
- Preceded by: François Bausch
- Succeeded by: Serge Wilmes

Personal details
- Born: 4 April 1977 (age 49) Luxembourg City, Luxembourg
- Party: The Greens
- Occupation: Lawyer

Samantha Tanson (born 4 April 1977) is a Luxembourgish lawyer and politician. She was the Minister of Culture from December 2018 to November 2023 and the Minister of Justice from September 2019 to November 2023. She was also the Minister of Housing between December 2018 and October 2019.

== Biography ==
Tanson studied at Pantheon-Sorbonne University in Paris and completed her studies with a master's degree in law and a diploma from Sciences Po Paris.

She was a collaborator of Luxembourg weekly newspaper D'Lëtzebuerger Land, and from 2002 to 2005 a journalist at RTL Radio Lëtzebuerg. She became a lawyer in 2005.

In 2009, she became one of the two spokespeople of the youth organisation of The Greens party. She was the spokeswoman of the party from 2009 to 2010 (alongside Christian Goebel) and later chaired the party. Moreover, she was the vice-chairwoman of the party foundation Grénger Stëftung alongside Claude Turmes.

From 2011 to 2018, Tanson was a Luxembourg City communal councillor. From 2013 to 2017, she was Chief Alderwoman of Luxembourg City - a position equivalent to that of deputy mayor - in charge of finance and mobility.

On 7 June 2015, she was appointed to the Council of State as a replacement for Agnès Rausch. However, she resigned from that position in order to replace her party colleague Claude Adam in the Chamber of Deputies. She was re-elected as a deputy in the October 2018 general election. Nonetheless, she resigned from her seat to take office as the Minister of Housing and the Minister of Culture within the Second Bettel–Schneider Ministry on 5 December 2018.

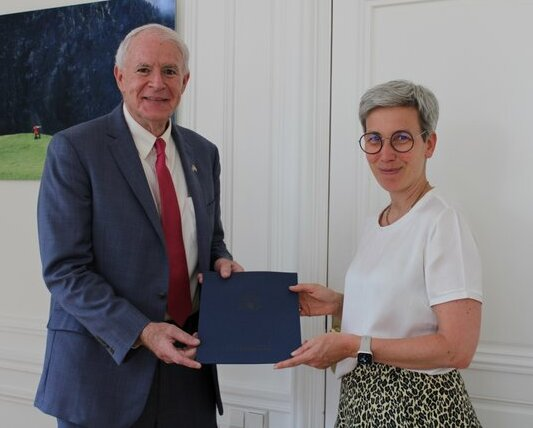
Tanson meeting in 2023 with U.S. Ambassador to Luxembourg Tom Barrett

On 6 September 2019, Tanson became the interim Minister of Justice as a replacement for Félix Braz, who suffered from severe illness. She was appointed as the titular Minister of Justice on 25 September 2019.

She was the Greens' national lead candidate in the 2023 general election, in which the party suffered a considerable loss in vote share, going from nine seats in the Chamber of Deputies to four. With the formation of the CSV-DP coalition government led by Luc Frieden, the Greens went into the opposition, with Tanson returning to the Chamber as a deputy.
