= Félix Braz =

Luxembourgish politician

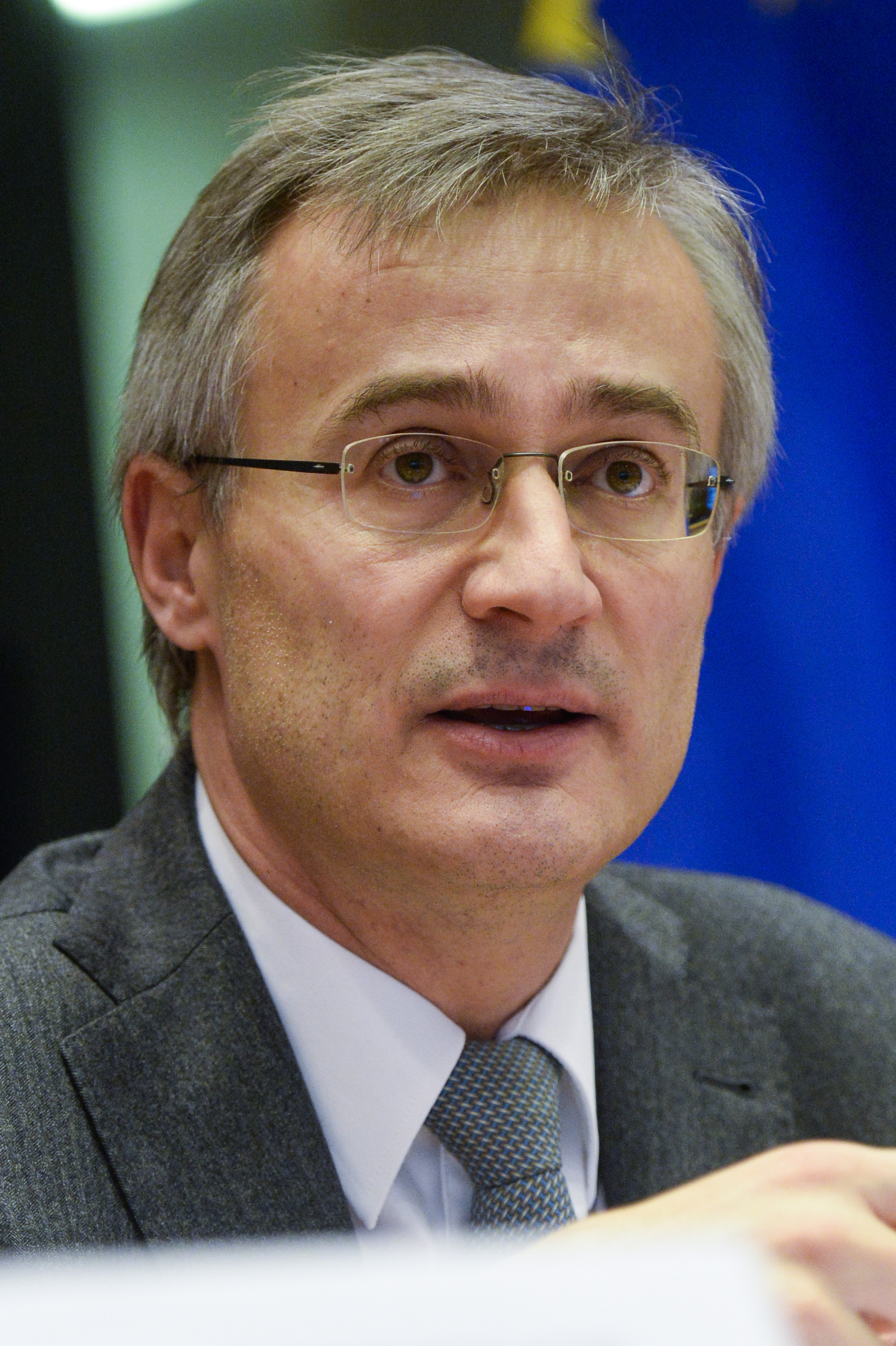

Second Deputy Prime Minister of Luxembourg
- In office 5 December 2018 – 11 October 2019 Serving with Etienne Schneider
- Prime Minister: Xavier Bettel
- Preceded by: Office established
- Succeeded by: François Bausch

Minister for Justice
- In office 4 December 2013 – 11 October 2019
- Prime Minister: Xavier Bettel
- Preceded by: Octavie Modert
- Succeeded by: Sam Tanson

Personal details
- Born: 16 March 1966 (age 60) Differdange, Luxembourg
- Citizenship: Portugal; Luxembourg
- Party: Greens
- Children: Liz Braz

Félix Braz (born 16 March 1966) is a Portuguese-Luxembourgish politician who served as Second Deputy Prime Minister of Luxembourg from 2018 to 2019. A member of the Greens, Braz also served as Minister of Justice in the Bettel I coalition government.

In October 2019, he was granted an "honourable resignation" from his position as Second Deputy Prime Minister and Minister of Justice, having suffered a major heart attack in August of that year that briefly left him in a coma. Now retired from politics, Braz has contested this involuntary resignation as "forced" and "unlawful", unsuccessfully challenging the decision with the Administrative Tribunal and Court.

== Biography ==
Braz, the son of Portuguese immigrants living in Luxembourg since 1960, was born in Differdange in 1966. He became a Luxembourg citizen when he completed 18 years old, in 1984. After secondary school, he started studying law at Panthéon-Sorbonne University, but broke off his studies after one year.

In 1990 he worked as chief editor and presenter of a news broadcast in Portuguese on RTL Radio Lëtzebuerg.

From 1991 he was the parliamentary secretary for the Greens. He was also a communal councillor in Esch-sur-Alzette from 1995 to 2000, and an alderman (échevin) from 2000 to 2011.

He was first elected to the Chamber of Deputies in 2004 for the Sud constituency, becoming the first Luxembourgish Deputy of Portuguese origin and was re-elected in 2009 and 2013. In the Chamber, he was vice-chairman of the Committee for Transport from 2004 to 2009. After the October 2013 elections, he became chairman of the Greens' parliamentary group. He joined the new coalition government as Minister for Justice on 4 December 2013.

== Personal life ==
Félix Braz regained his Portuguese citizenship in 2024, 40 years after renouncing it in order to become a Luxembourgish citizen, as Luxembourg has allowed multiple citizenship since 2008.

His daughter Liz entered politics in 2023 as a member of the LSAP, being elected that year to both the Esch-sur-Alzette communal council and the Chamber of Deputies, and becoming only the second Portuguese Luxembourger to achieve the latter, after her father.

== Honours ==
- Portugal: Grand Cross of the Order of Merit (23 May 2017)

Political offices
| Preceded by Octavie Modert | Minister for Justice; 2013 – 2019 | Succeeded by Sam Tanson |
