= Tânia Morais =

Luxembourgish football referee

Tânia Fernandes Morais (born 12 September 1982) is a Luxembourgish Association football referee and former footballer.

== Early life ==
Morais moved from Portugal to Luxembourg at the age of eight. Morais studied economics.

== Career ==
Morais played as a goalkeeper before starting refereeing in 2001.

Morais became the first Luxembourgish female referee to referee a senior men's game. She has refereed games in the French and Belgian women's leagues. She has been involved in basketball in Luxembourg. Morais obtained a FIFA Referee License. She has a brother.
