= Max Hengel =

Luxembourgish politician (1977–2024)

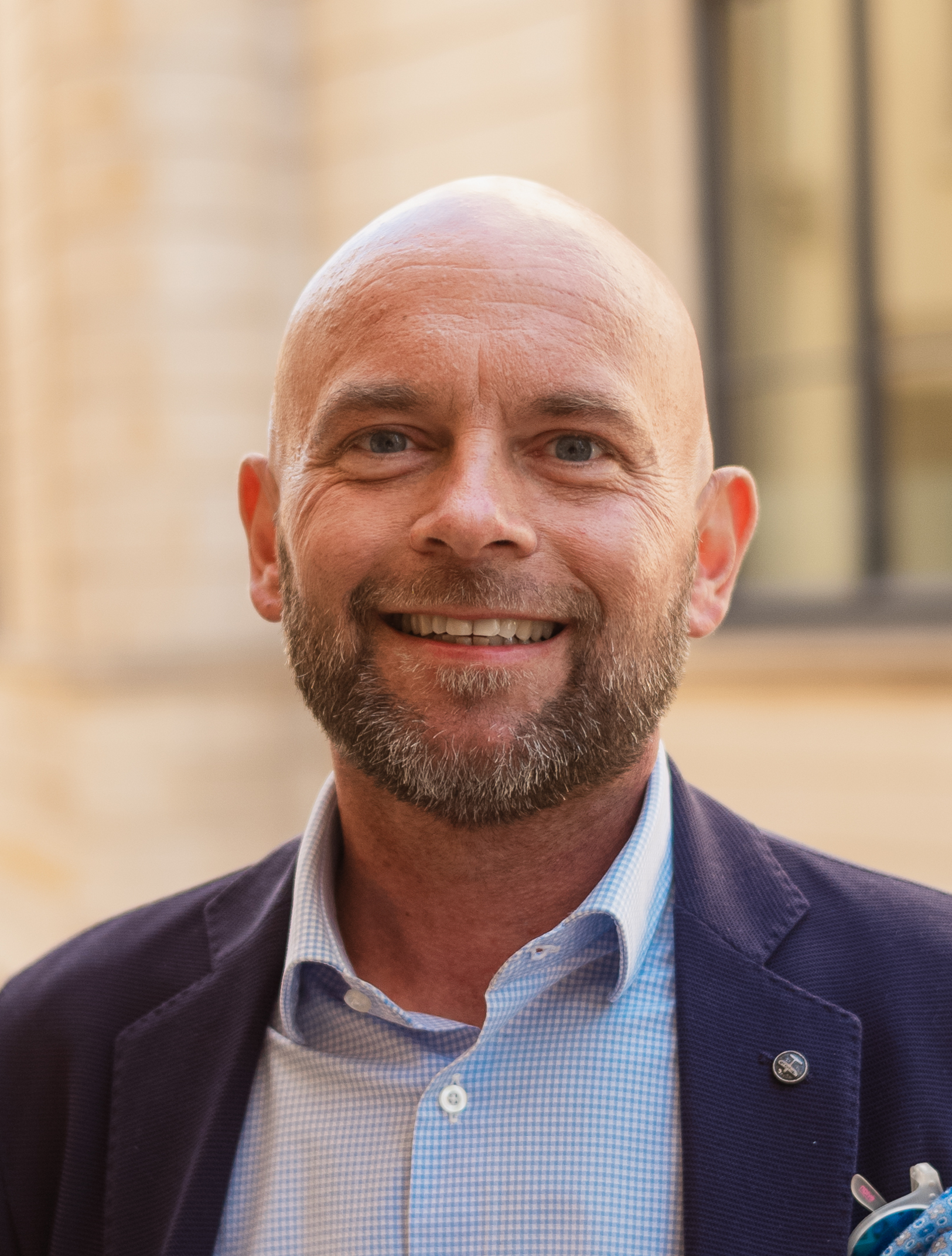
- Hengel in 2023

Member of the Chamber of Deputies
- In office 11 January 2022 – 17 August 2024
- Preceded by: Françoise Hetto-Gaasch
- Succeeded by: Ricardo Marques
- Constituency: East

Mayor of Wormeldange
- In office 3 July 2023 – 17 August 2024
- Preceded by: Mathis Ast
- Succeeded by: Claude Pundel
- In office 16 November 2017 – 4 November 2020
- Succeeded by: Mathis Ast

Personal details
- Born: 8 May 1977 Luxembourg City, Luxembourg
- Died: 17 August 2024 (aged 47)
- Party: Christian Social People's Party
- Children: 2

Max Hengel (8 May 1977 – 17 August 2024) was a Luxembourgish politician. He served as a member of the Chamber of Deputies from 2022, representing the East constituency until his death.

== Life and career ==
Hengel was born on 8 May 1977 in Luxembourg City and was raised in Wormeldange. He joined the Christian Social People's Party (CSV) in 1998 and studied law, history, and political science.

He was first elected to the municipal council of Wormeldange from 2011 to 2017. In the 2017 elections, Hengel received the most votes with 701 and Mathis Ast came second place with 606. However, Hengel's team won four seats while Ast's team won five seats. Despite losing the majority, Hengel claimed the position of mayor. A few days later, an agreement was reached between Hengel and Ast where the former would serve as mayor and the latter as a municipal alderman for three years. Ast would then take over as mayor and Hengel as a municipal alderman and both would serve the remaining three years. Hengel was sworn in as mayor and Ast as a municipal alderman on 16 November 2017. Following his election as mayor, he stepped down as the president of basketball club Musel Pikes after serving in the position for seven years. In accordance with the agreement made, on 4 November 2020, Ast was sworn in as mayor of Wormeldange and Hengel became a municipal alderman.

Following the resignation of Françoise Hetto-Gaasch, Hengel was slated to succeed her seat in the East constituency of the Chamber of Deputies. Hengel was sworn in on 11 January 2022. He was selected to co-lead the CSV ticket in the East constituency for the 2023 election, alongside Léon Gloden. Hengel retained his seat in the election.

In an interview with RTL, Hengel stated his intentions to run for mayor of Wormeldange again in 2023. Hengel ended up running for the list Är Equipe fir d'Wormer Gemeen and won with 1,677 votes, placing first place. Hengel was selected as Wormeldange's mayor and served from July 2023 until his death in August 2024.

=== Death ===
On 17 August 2024, Hengel died from colorectal cancer at the age of 47. Prime Minister of Luxembourg Luc Frieden described Hengel's death as "a major loss for our political landscape and for the CSV". Ricardo Marques, deputy mayor of Echternach, was selected as Hengel's successor; he was sworn in on 10 October. Marques was previously a candidate in the 2023 Chamber of Deputies election.
