= Liz Braz =

Luxembourgish politician (born 1996)

The Honourable Liz Braz
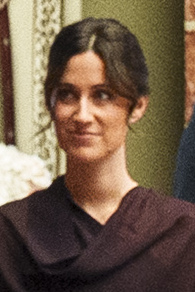
- Braz in 2025

Member of the Chamber of Deputies
- Incumbent
- Assumed office 24 October 2023
- Constituency: South

Personal details
- Born: 29 September 1996 (age 30) Luxembourg City, Luxembourg
- Party: Luxembourg Socialist Workers' Party
- Parent: Félix Braz (father)

Liz Braz (born 29 September 1996) is a Luxembourgish politician of the Luxembourg Socialist Workers' Party who was elected member of the Chamber of Deputies in 2023. She is the daughter of former Deputy Prime Minister Félix Braz, and the second ever Luxembourgish deputy of Portuguese descent after her father. She is also currently the youngest member of the Chamber of Deputies.
