= Yuliya Nikolayenko =

Kazakhstani footballer

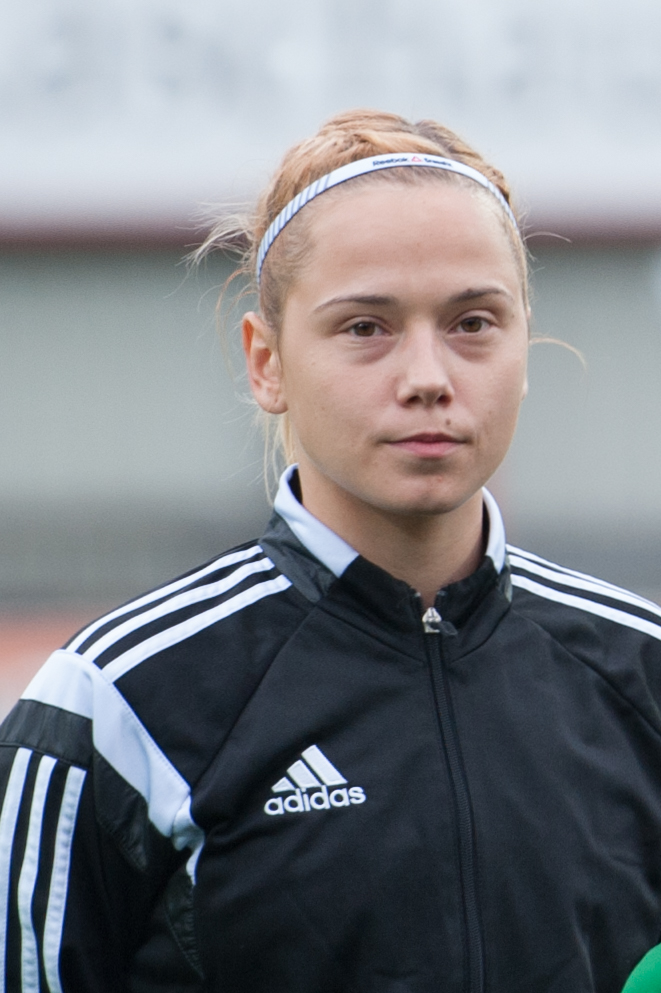

Personal information
- Date of birth: 17 August 1992 (age 34)
- Position: Midfielder

International career^{‡}
Years	Team	Apps	(Gls)
- Kazakhstan
- ‡ National team caps and goals as of 19:10, 30 August 2019 (UTC)

Yuliya Nikolayenko (Russian: Юлия Николаенко; born 17 August 1992) is a Kazakhstani footballer who plays as a midfielder and has appeared for the Kazakhstan women's national team.

== Career ==
Nikolayenko has been capped for the Kazakhstan national team, appearing for the team during the 2019 FIFA Women's World Cup qualifying cycle.
