= Birita Nielsen =

Faroese association football player

Personal information
- Date of birth: 7 September 1999 (age 27)
- Place of birth: Faroe Islands
- Position: Defender

Team information
- Current team: ÍF/Víkingur/B68

Senior career*
| Years | Team | Apps | (Gls) |
| 2016–2018 | B68 | 60 | (1) |
| 2019– | ÍF/Víkingur/B68 | 5 | (0) |

International career^{‡}
| 2014–2015 | Faroe Islands U17 | 5 | (0) |
| 2016–2017 | Faroe Islands U19 | 5 | (0) |
| 2017– | Faroe Islands | 7 | (1) |
- * Club domestic league appearances and goals as of 7 July 2019 ‡ National team caps and goals as of 7 July 2019

Birita Nielsen (born 7 September 1999) is a Faroese football defender who currently plays for ÍF/Víkingur/B68 and the Faroe Islands women's national football team.
