= Gabriela De Lemos =

Luxembourgish footballer

Personal information
- Date of birth: 24 March 1997 (age 29)
- Position: Midfielder

Team information
- Current team: Swift Hesperange
- Number: 19

Senior career*
Years	Team	Apps	(Gls)
2017–2020	Junglinster		
2020–2025	Racing FC	22	(14)
2025–	Swift Hesperange	18	(6)

International career^{‡}
2013–	Luxembourg	23	(5)
- * Club domestic league appearances and goals as of 8 June 2026 ‡ National team caps and goals as of 21 February 2022

Gabriela De Lemos (born 24 March 1997) is a Luxembourgish footballer who plays as a midfielder for Swift Hesperange and the Luxembourg women's national team.

== Career ==
De Lemos has been capped for the Luxembourg national team, appearing for the team during the 2019 FIFA Women's World Cup qualifying cycle.

=== International goals ===
#	Date	Venue	Opponent	Score	Result	Competition
1.	4 November 2016	Stade Kuerzwénkel, Consdorf, Luxembourg	Faroe Islands	1–1	2–1	Friendly
2.	6 November 2016	Stade Albert Kongs, Itzig, Luxembourg	Faroe Islands	1–0	1–1	Friendly
3.	8 April 2017	Tórsvøllur, Tórshavn, Faroe Islands	Turkey	1–5	1–9	2019 FIFA Women's World Cup qualification
4.	11 April 2017	Tórsvøllur, Tórshavn, Faroe Islands	Montenegro	1–7	1–7	2019 FIFA Women's World Cup qualification
5.	19 February 2022	Stade Molsheim, Molsheim, France	Tahiti	11–0	11–0	Friendly
