= Jadranka Pavičević =

Montenegrin footballer

Personal information
- Date of birth: 17 June 1989 (age 37)
- Position: Midfielder

International career^{‡}
Years	Team	Apps	(Gls)
- Montenegro
- ‡ National team caps and goals as of 19:45, 30 August 2019 (UTC)

Jadranka Pavičević (Serbian Cyrillic: Јадранка Павичевић; born 17 June 1989) is a Montenegrin footballer who plays as a midfielder and has appeared for the Montenegro women's national team.

== Career ==
Pavičević has been capped for the Montenegro national team, appearing for the team during the 2019 FIFA Women's World Cup qualifying cycle.
