= Carina Nogueira =

Luxembourgish footballer

Personal information
- Full name: Carina Alves Nogueira
- Date of birth: 19 November 1982 (age 43)
- Position: Defender

Senior career*
Years	Team	Apps	(Gls)
- RFCU Luxemburg
- FC Mamer 32
- Jeunesse Junglinster

International career^{‡}
2007–2012	Luxembourg	16	(1)
- * Club domestic league appearances and goals ‡ National team caps and goals as of 28 November 2012

Carina Alves Nogueira (born 19 November 1982) is a Luxembourgish former footballer who played as a defender. She has also been a member of the Luxembourg women's national team.
