= SC Ell =

Association football club in Luxembourg

Ell
- Full name: Sporting Club Ell
- Founded: Men: 1971; 55 years ago Women: 2005; 21 years ago
- Ground: Stade Um Essig, Ell
- Capacity: 1,500
- League: Men: 2. Division Series 1 Women: Ligue 1
- 2025–26: Men: 2. Division Series 1, 12th of 14; Women: Ligue 1, 6th of 10
- Website: https://www.scell.lu/

Sporting Club Ell is a football club, based in Ell, Luxembourg.

The men's team currently compete in the 2. Division Series 1, the fourth tier of Luxembourgish football.

The women's football team has won the national championship Dames Ligue 1 in 2013–14 and a Luxembourg Women's Cup in 2012.

== History ==
The men's team was founded (originally) in 1920, although it was disbanded three times before the current incarnation was founded in 1971.

The women's team was founded in 2005. In 2009–10 they won promotion to the national top league. They then reached the 2012 cup final against favorites Progrès Niederkorn which they won in a penalty shootout. In 2013–14 the team won the championship.
