= Jeunesse Junglinster =

Association football club in Luxembourg

- Founded: 7 February 1935; 91 years ago
- Ground: Terrain Route de Luxembourg, Junglinster
- Capacity: 1,500
- League: Men: 2. Division Series 2 Women: Ligue 1
- 2025–26: Men: Ligue 1, 4th of 10; Women: Ligue 1, 4th of 10

Jeunesse Junglinster is a football club, based in Junglinster, Luxembourg.

The men's team currently compete in the 2. Division Series 2, the fourth tier of Luxembourgish football.

The women's football team has won the national championship Dames Ligue 1 in 2010, 2012, 2013 and 2015 as well as the Luxembourg Women's Cup in 2010, 2011, 2015.

== Current squad (2022/23 season) ==
Note: Flags indicate national team as defined under FIFA eligibility rules; some limited exceptions apply. Players may hold more than one non-FIFA nationality.

No.	Pos.	Nation	Player
2	DF	COD	Romain Lebale May Mass
4	MF	FRA	Jonathan Furst
6	MF	CPV	Rivone Aleixo
7	DF	CPV	Vanderlei Lopes Gomes
8	MF	LUX	Yannick Delgado
9	FW	MNE	Demir Mekic
10	MF	LUX	Matteo Lumare
11	MF	LUX	Bacar Sanha
17	DF	LUX	Jérémy Mendes
21	MF	LUX	Luc Bausch
24	MF	LUX	Steve Hurt
25	DF	LUX	Mike Hurt
27	FW	LUX	William Rodrigues

No.	Pos.	Nation	Player
32	MF	LUX	William Ferreira
35	MF	LUX	Denilson Andrade
40	MF	POR	Yoann Goncalves
41	GK	LUX	Pit Baum
66	DF	LUX	Henrique Pereira Da Silva Rocha
71	GK	LUX	André Fernandes
75	DF	LUX	Fábio Gaspar
77	MF	GBS	Mamadu Aliu Djalo
93	MF	GER	Meliani Siam
99	GK	POR	Pedro Gonçalves
—	GK	POL	Michał Augustyn ´
—	MF	LUX	Robin Moreira Dos Santos
—	FW	LUX	Lucas Tsapanos
