= 2015 1. deild kvinnur =

1. deild kvinnur
- Season: 2015
- Champions: KÍ Klaksvík (17th title)
- Champions League: KÍ Klaksvík
- Matches: 50
- Goals: 236 (4.72 per match)
- Top goalscorer: Heidi Sevdal, Maria Thomsen (22 goals)
- Biggest home win: KÍ 10–1 AB/B36
- Biggest away win: AB/B36 0–7 KÍ; ÍF/Víkingur 0–7 KÍ; AB/B36 2–9 HB
- Highest scoring: KÍ 10–1 AB/B36; AB/B36 2–9 HB
- All statistics correct as of 11 October 2015.

Location of teams in 1. deild kvinnur 2015

The 2015 1. deild kvinnur was the 31st season of women's league football in the Faroe Islands.

The season was played between 21 March 2015 and 10 October 2015. The defending champions were KÍ, who successfully defended their title for the 15th year running. It was KÍ 17th league title overall and qualified them to play the 2016–17 UEFA Women's Champions League.

== Format ==
In contrast to last season, just five teams played in the league, as AB and B36 merged. In order to have the same number of matches, the teams played each other five times in the season. Thus each team had 20 matches.

== Teams ==
The 2015 season consisted of the following teams.

Team	Home city	Home ground	Capacity
AB/B36	Argir/Tórshavn	Inni í Vika	2,000
EB/Streymur/Skála	Streymnes	við Margáir	1,000
HB	Tórshavn	Gundadalur	5,000
ÍF/Víkingur	Fuglafjørður/Gøta	í Fløtugerði	3,000
KÍ	Klaksvík	Við Djúpumýrar	3,000

== League table ==
Pos	Team	Pld	W	D	L	GF	GA	GD	Pts	Qualification
1	KÍ (C)	20	17	2	1	82	11	+71	53	UEFA Women's Champions League
2	EB/Streymur/Skála	20	13	3	4	67	22	+45	42	
3	HB	20	10	3	7	59	35	+24	33	
4	ÍF/Víkingur	20	4	3	13	19	62	−43	15	
5	AB/B36	20	0	1	19	9	106	−97	1	

(C) Champions

== Results ==
Home \ Away	AB36	EBS	HB	ÍFV	KÍ	AB36	EBS	HB	ÍFV	KÍ	AB36	EBS	HB	ÍFV	KÍ
AB/B36		1–7	1–5	0–3	0–7		1–5	0–5	0–3	0–4			2–9	1–1	
EB/Streymur/Skála	5–2		1–1	2–0	2–2	7–0		4–0	4–2	0–1	8–0				2–1
HB	8–0	1–4		3–0	0–2	3–0	1–2		5–0	1–4		3–2		3–0	
ÍF/Víkingur	2–0	0–5	2–2		0–7	3–0	1–1	1–5		0–3		0–6			1–2
KÍ	10–1	4–0	5–1	7–0		5–0	1–0	4–2	6–0		6–0		1–1		

Updated to match(es) played on 10 October 2015. Source: Soccerway
Legend: Blue = home team win; Yellow = draw; Red = away team win.

== Top scorers ==
As of 11 October 2015

Rank	Scorer	Club	Goals
1	(Faroe Islands) Heidi Sevdal	HB	22
1	(Faroe Islands) Maria Thomsen	KÍ	22
3	(Faroe Islands) Margunn Lindholm	EBS/Skála	17
4	(Faroe Islands) Milja Simonsen	HB	15
5	(Faroe Islands) Rannvá Andreasen	KÍ	13
5	(Faroe Islands) Malena Josephsen	KÍ	13
7	(Faroe Islands) Íðunn Magnussen	EBS/Skála	11
8	(Faroe Islands) Lív Arge	HB	9
9	(Faroe Islands) Fríðrún Olsen	EBS/Skála	8
10	(Faroe Islands) Sigrid Jacobsen	KÍ	7
10	(Faroe Islands) Eyðvør Klakstein	KÍ	7
10	(Faroe Islands) Anna Sofía Sevdal	EBS/Skála	7
