= 2020 1. deild kvinnur =

Betri deildin kvinnur
- Season: 2020
- Dates: 24 Mai – 17 October
- Champions: KÍ
- Champions League: KÍ
- Matches: 60
- Goals: 184 (3.07 per match)
- Top goalscorer: Evy á Lakjuni (17 goals)
- Biggest home win: NSÍ 6–1 EB/S/Skála (11 October 2020)
- Biggest away win: B36 0–5 KÍ (30 August 2020)
- Highest scoring: KÍ 4–4 HB (26 August 2020); EB/Streymur/Skála 2–6 NSÍ (28 June 2020)
- All statistics correct as of 17 October 2020.

The 2020 1. deild kvinnur (also known as Betri deildin kvinnur for sponsorship reasons) was the 36th season of women's league football in the Faroe Islands. KÍ Klaksvík were the defending champions, having won their 18th title the previous season. The season started on 24 May (delayed due to the COVID-19 pandemic) and ended on 17 October. KÍ Klaksvík once again won the championship.

After the football season was over the club Víkingur proclaimed that they wanted to end the co-operation with the two other clubs ÍF and B68. They wanted to continue on their own to develop football for girls and women from the next season and in the future.

== Teams ==
Locations of the 2020 1. deild kvinnur teams

In 2020 the league will be contested by six teams, the same as in 2018, one team more from last season's five, as the women's team from the club NSÍ from Runavík entered the league.

Team	City	Stadium
B36 Tórshavn	Tórshavn	Gundadalur
EB/Streymur/Skála	Streymnes	Við Margáir
Havnar Bóltfelag	Tórshavn	Gundadalur
ÍF/Víkingur/B68	Norðragøta	Sarpugerði
Klaksvíkar Ítróttarfelag	Klaksvík	Við Djúpumýrar
NSÍ Runavík	Runavík	Við Løkin

== League table ==
Pos	Team	Pld	W	D	L	GF	GA	GD	Pts	Qualification or relegation
1	KÍ (C)	20	18	2	0	55	17	+38	56	Qualification for the Champions League first round
2	NSÍ	20	8	6	6	38	29	+9	30	
3	HB	20	7	6	7	38	31	+7	27	
4	B36	20	6	5	9	23	31	−8	23	
5	ÍF/Víkingur/B68	20	5	4	11	26	40	−14	19	
6	EB/Streymur/Skála	20	4	1	15	16	48	−32	13	

Source: Faroe Soccer
Rules for classification: 1) points; 2) goal difference; 3) number of goals scored.
(C) Champions

== Managers ==
Club	Manager
B36 Tórshavn	(Faroe Islands) Súni Olsen
EB/Streymur/Skála	(Faroe Islands) Óli Eidesgaard
HB Tórshavn	(Faroe Islands) Kári Reynheim
ÍF/Víkingur/B68	(Faroe Islands) Sonni Djurhuus
KÍ Klaksvík	(Serbia) Aleksandar Đorđević
NSÍ Runavík	(Faroe Islands) Egil G. Olsen

== Top goalscorers ==
As of 17 October 2020

Source: fsf.fo - Faroe Islands Football Association

Player	Club	Goals
(Faroe Islands) Evy á Lakjuni	KÍ	16
(Faroe Islands) Heidi Sevdal	NSÍ	12
(Faroe Islands) Olga Kristina Hansen	B36	7
(Faroe Islands) Julia Naomi Mortensen	HB	7
(Faroe Islands) Kára Djurhuus	HB	7
(Faroe Islands) Jacoba Langgaard	ÍVB	7
(Faroe Islands) Jensa Tórolvsdóttir	ÍVB	6
(Faroe Islands) Rannvá Andreasen	KÍ	6
(Faroe Islands) Ása Carlsen	HB	6
(Faroe Islands) Laila Pætursdóttir	NSÍ	6
