= Faroese Women's Super Cup =

Stórsteypadystur kvinnur
- Founded: 2019
- Region: Faroe Islands
- Teams: 2
- Current champions: KÍ (4th title)
- Most championships: KÍ (4 titles)
- 2025

The Faroese Women's Super Cup is a football competition in the Faroe Islands, contested between the champions of 1. deild kvinnur and the winners of the Faroese Women's Cup from the previous season.

== History ==
The competition was introduced in 2019 and, as its men's counterpart, is organized in a partnership between the Faroe Islands Football Association and the charity organization Lions Club. In its first edition it was won by HB, the league and cup runners-up, as EB/Streymur/Skála had won the double, in the same day the HB men's team defeated rivals B36 to win the men's competition. The Super Cup will now officially open the season of Faroese women's football.

== Matches ==
=== 2019 ===
3 March 2019
14:00 UTC+0

EB/Streymur/Skála	1–7	HB
B. Mikkelsen 59'	Report	Isaksen 4', 16'; Sevdal 7', 68', 90'; Benbakoura 49', 74'

Tórsvøllur, Tórshavn
Attendance: 50
Referee: Rani Skaalum

=== 2020 ===
14 March 2020
16:00 UTC+0

KÍ	Cancelled	HB

Tórsvøllur, Tórshavn
Referee: Áki Hansen

The match was cancelled due to the COVID-19 pandemic.

=== 2021 ===
13 March 2021
17:00 UTC+0

KÍ	4–1	NSÍ
M. Olsen 2' á Lakjuni 63'; Andreasen 67' (pen.), 86'	Report	Lindholm 77'

Tórsvøllur, Tórshavn
Referee: Jón Þór Baldvinsson

=== 2022 ===
12 March 2022
17:00 UTC+0

KÍ	0–0	NSÍ
	Report
Penalties
T. Joensen (penalty scored); Svarvadal (penalty missed); Hummeland (penalty scored); Mohr (penalty missed)	2–4	(penalty scored) D. Olsen; (penalty scored) Jakobsen; (penalty scored) Hansen; (penalty missed) L. Olsen; (penalty scored) Sevdal

Tórsvøllur, Tórshavn
Referee: Heini Viðoy

=== 2023 ===
4 March 2023
17:00 UTC+0

KÍ	2–0	NSÍ
M. Olsen 14'; E. Klakstein 62'	Report

Tórsvøllur, Tórshavn
Referee: Annfinn Hjaltalin

=== 2024 ===
24 March 2024
17:00 UTC+0

KÍ	2–1	NSÍ
E. Klakstein 5', 44'	Report	S. Joensen 31'

Tórsvøllur, Tórshavn
Referee: Leivur Zachariassen

=== 2025 ===
2 March 2025
15:00 UTC+0

KÍ	2–1	NSÍ
Hummeland 70'; E. Klakstein 75'	Report	Sevdal 61'

Tórsvøllur, Tórshavn
Referee: Andras Frederiksberg

== Performances by club ==
Team	Titles	Runners-up
KÍ Klaksvík	4	1
NSÍ Runavík	1	4
HB	1	0
EB/Streymur/Skála	0	1
