= 2017 1. deild kvinnur =

1. deild kvinnur
- Season: 2017
- Champions: EB/Streymur/Skála
- Champions League: EB/Streymur/Skála
- Matches: 60
- Goals: 279 (4.65 per match)
- Top goalscorer: Heidi Sevdal (33)

The 2017 1. deild kvinnur was the 33rd season of women's league football in the Faroe Islands.

The league was won by EB/Streymur/Skála, winning its first title and ending KÍ's streak of 17 consecutive titles. By winning, EBS/Skála qualified to 2018–19 UEFA Women's Champions League, becoming only the second club from the Faroe Islands to play the competition.

== Format ==
Originally seven teams entered the league, but AB/B71 withdrew after 2 matches. This maintained the league with the same format of the previous seasons, with the six teams playing each other four times for a total of 20 matches.

== League table ==
Pos	Team	Pld	W	D	L	GF	GA	GD	Pts	Qualification
1	EB/Streymur/Skála	20	17	1	2	85	16	+69	52	Qualification to Champions League
2	KÍ	20	16	2	2	98	18	+80	50	
3	HB	20	11	2	7	48	31	+17	35	
4	ÍF/Víkingur	20	5	1	14	15	85	−70	16	
5	B36	20	4	2	14	20	62	−42	14	
6	B68	20	2	2	16	13	67	−54	8	

== Top scorers ==
Rank	Scorer	Club	Goals
1	Heidi Sevdal	EBS/Skála	33
2	Rannvá Andreasen	KÍ	19
3	Malena Josephsen	KÍ	15
4	Rebekka Benbakoura	HB	14
5	Hervør Olsen	KÍ	13
5	Maria Thomsen	KÍ	13
