= 2018 1. deild kvinnur =

Betri deildin kvinnur
- Season: 2018
- Dates: 11 March – 26 October
- Champions: EB/Streymur/Skála (2nd title)
- Matches: 60
- Goals: 273 (4.55 per match)
- Top goalscorer: Heidi Sevdal (23 goals)

The 2018 1. deild kvinnur (also known as Betri deildin kvinnur for sponsorship reasons) was the 34th season of women's league football in the Faroe Islands. EB/Streymur/Skála were the defending champions, having won their first title the previous season. The season started in 11 March and ended on 26 October.

== Format ==
Each team plays each other four times for a total of 20 matches. There is no relegation.

== Teams ==
Locations of the 2018 1. deild kvinnur teams

Team	Home city	Home ground
B36	Tórshavn	Gundadalur
B68	Toftir	Svangaskarð
EB/Streymur/Skála	Streymnes	við Margáir
EB/Streymur/Skála	Skála	undir Mýruhjalla (Note: Used on matchdays 12–15, 19.)
HB	Tórshavn	Gundadalur
ÍF/Víkingur	Norðragøta	Sarpugerði
KÍ	Klaksvík	Við Djúpumýrar

== League table ==
Pos	Team	Pld	W	D	L	GF	GA	GD	Pts	Qualification
1	EB/Streymur/Skála	20	16	2	2	80	14	+66	50	Qualification to Champions League
2	Havnar Bóltfelag	20	14	3	3	76	21	+55	45	
3	KÍ Klaksvík	20	14	3	3	57	19	+38	45	
4	ÍF/Víkingur	20	6	1	13	29	58	−29	19	
5	B68 Toftir	20	2	2	16	19	87	−68	8	
6	B36 Tórshavn	20	1	3	16	12	74	−62	6	

== Results ==
Home \ Away	B36	B68	EBS	HB	ÍFV	KÍ	B36	B68	EBS	HB	ÍFV	KÍ
B36		1–1	0–6	0–5	1–3	2–4		1–2	0–3	0–6	0–1	1–2
B68	0–0		2–8	1–8	0–4	0–7	1–3		0–7	1–9	4–1	1–4
EBS/Skála	7–0	8–1		6–1	2–0	1–0	8–0	4–1		2–0	6–0	1–0
HB	5–0	3–0	2–1		2–0	2–1	6–0	8–1	1–1		7–0	0–2
ÍF/Víkingur	4–2	3–1	0–3	0–4		1–2	0–0	3–1	1–5	3–5		1–5
KÍ	6–0	3–0	4–0	1–1	4–2		4–1	2–1	1–1	1–1	4–2	

Legend: Blue = home team win; Yellow = draw; Red = away team win.

== Top scorers ==
As of 26 October.

Rank	Player	Club	Goals
1	Heidi Sevdal	HB	23
2	Milja Simonsen	HB	22
3	Margunn Lindholm	EBS/Skála	17
3	Rannvá Andreasen	KÍ	17
4	Birna T. Mikkelsen	EBS/Skála	16
5	Ansy Sevdal Jakobsen	EBS/Skála	14
