= 2019 1. deild kvinnur =

Betri deildin kvinnur
- Season: 2019
- Dates: 9 March – 28 September
- Champions: KÍ (19th title)
- Champions League: KÍ
- Matches: 40
- Goals: 135 (3.38 per match)
- Top goalscorer: Heidi Sevdal (25 goals)
- Biggest home win: HB 10–0 B36 (R11)
- Biggest away win: B36 1–6 HB (R6); EBS/Skála 0–5 HB (R12); B36 1–6 KÍ (R16)
- Highest scoring: HB 10–0 B36 (R11)
- All statistics correct as of 28 September 2019.

The 2019 1. deild kvinnur (also known as Betri deildin kvinnur for sponsorship reasons) was the 35th season of women's league football in the Faroe Islands. EB/Streymur/Skála were the defending champions, having won their 2nd title the previous season. The season started on 9 March and ended on 28 September.

== Teams ==
Locations of the 2019 1. deild kvinnur teams

The league was contested by five teams, a decrease from last season's six, as B68 joined ÍF/Víkingur to compete as ÍF/Víkingur/B68.

| Team | City | Stadium |
|---|---|---|
| B36 Tórshavn | Tórshavn | Gundadalur |
| EB/Streymur/Skála | Streymnes | Við Margáir |
| Havnar Bóltfelag | Tórshavn | Gundadalur |
| ÍF/Víkingur/B68 | Norðragøta | Sarpugerði |
| Klaksvíkar Ítróttarfelag | Klaksvík | Við Djúpumýrar |

== League table ==
| Pos | Team | Pld | W | D | L | GF | GA | GD | Pts | Qualification or relegation |
|---|---|---|---|---|---|---|---|---|---|---|
| 1 | KÍ (C) | 16 | 10 | 3 | 3 | 31 | 12 | +19 | 33 | Champions League qualifying round |
| 2 | HB | 16 | 9 | 2 | 5 | 49 | 17 | +32 | 29 | |
| 3 | ÍF/Víkingur/B68 | 16 | 8 | 4 | 4 | 29 | 16 | +13 | 28 | |
| 4 | EB/Streymur/Skála | 16 | 4 | 3 | 9 | 14 | 43 | −29 | 15 | |
| 5 | B36 | 16 | 3 | 0 | 13 | 12 | 47 | −35 | 9 | |

Source: Faroe Soccer
Rules for classification: 1) points; 2) goal difference; 3) number of goals scored.
(C) Champions

== Results ==
Each team played four times (twice at home and twice away) against every other team for a total of 16 matches each.

=== First and second round ===
| Home \ Away | B36 | ESK | HB | IVB | KI |
|---|---|---|---|---|---|
| B36 | — | 1–0 | 1–6 | 0–1 | 0–3 |
| EB/Streymur/Skála | 2–1 | — | 0–4 | 0–4 | 1–5 |
| HB | 1–2 | 8–0 | — | 2–2 | 0–1 |
| ÍF/Víkingur/B68 | 4–1 | 4–1 | 2–1 | — | 0–1 |
| KÍ | 2–1 | 3–0 | 0–2 | 1–1 | — |

Source: Faroe Soccer (in Faroese)
Legend: Blue = home team win; Yellow = draw; Red = away team win.

=== Third and fourth round ===
| Home \ Away | B36 | ESK | HB | IVB | KI |
|---|---|---|---|---|---|
| B36 | — | 2–3 | 1–0 | 0–2 | 1–6 |
| EB/Streymur/Skála | 2–1 | — | 0–5 | 1–1 | 1–0 |
| HB | 10–0 | 3–2 | — | 1–0 | 1–1 |
| ÍF/Víkingur/B68 | 3–0 | 1–1 | 2–3 | — | 2–0 |
| KÍ | 2–0 | 0–0 | 3–2 | 3–0 | — |

Source: Faroe Soccer (in Faroese)
Legend: Blue = home team win; Yellow = draw; Red = away team win.

== Top goalscorers ==
| Player | Club | Goals |
|---|---|---|
| Heidi Sevdal | HB | 25 |
| Rebekka Benbakoura | HB | 11 |
| Julia Naomi Mortensen | HB | 10 |
| Hanna Højgaard | ÍF/Víkingur/B68 | 8 |
| Jacoba Langgaard | ÍF/Víkingur/B68 | 7 |
| Evy á Lakjuni | KÍ | 6 |
| Sarita Maria Mittfoss | B36 | 6 |
| Eyðvør Klakstein | KÍ | 5 |
