= 2016 1. deild kvinnur =

1. deild kvinnur
- Season: 2016
- Matches: 60
- Goals: 276 (4.6 per match)
- Top goalscorer: Milja Simonsen (25)

The 2016 1. deild kvinnur was the 32nd season of women's league football in the Faroe Islands.

The league was won by KÍ, its 17th consecutive title and 18th overall. By winning, KÍ qualified to 2017–18 UEFA Women's Champions League.

== League table ==
Pos	Team	Pld	W	D	L	GF	GA	GD	Pts	Qualification
1	KÍ	20	17	3	0	100	9	+91	54	Qualification to Champions League
2	EB/Streymur/Skála	20	15	3	2	59	19	+40	48	
3	B36	20	10	1	9	37	37	0	31	
4	HB	20	8	1	11	54	35	+19	25	
5	ÍF/Víkingur	20	5	1	14	24	60	−36	16	
6	B68	20	0	1	19	2	116	−114	1	

== Top scorers ==
Rank	Scorer	Club	Goals
1	Milja Simonsen	HB	25
2	Margunn Lindholm	EBS/Skála	19
3	Hervør Olsen	KÍ	17
3	Rannvá Andreasen	KÍ	17
5	Maria Thomsen	KÍ	16
