= Olga Kristina Hansen =

Faroese footballer

Personal information
- Full name: Olga Kristina Hansen
- Date of birth: February 28, 1990 (age 36)
- Position: Midfielder

Team information
- Current team: B36 Torshavn

Senior career*
Years	Team	Apps	(Gls)
2010–2011	AB	25	(29)
2011	KR Reykjavik	5	(1)
2011	AB	1	(1)
2012	KR Reykjavik	13	(1)
2014–?	Østerbro IF		
2014–2016	KÍ Klaksvík	24	(5)
2017–2018	Ballerup-Skovlunde Fodbold	0	(0)
2018	KÍ Klaksvík	3	(0)
2019–	B36 Torshavn	88	(20)

International career^{‡}
2006–2008	Faroe Islands U19	9	(1)
2006–	Faroe Islands	68	(5)
- * Club domestic league appearances and goals as of 26 July 2023 ‡ National team caps and goals as of 26 July 2023

Olga Kristina Hansen (born 28 February 1990) is a Faroese football midfielder who currently plays for B36 Torshavn and the Faroe Islands women's national football team.

== Honours ==
KÍ

- 1. deild kvinnur: 2014, 2015, 2016
- Steypakappingin kvinnur: 2014, 2015, 2016
