= Monika Biskopstø =

Faroese footballer (born 1994)

Personal information
- Full name: Monika Biskopstø
- Date of birth: December 29, 1994 (age 31)
- Place of birth: Faroe Islands,
- Position: Goalkeeper

Team information
- Current team: HB

Senior career*
| Years | Team | Apps | (Gls) |
| 2011–2015 | KÍ | 30 | (0) |
| 2019 | AaB | 0 | (0) |
| 2019- | Kí | 3 | (0) |
| 2022- | HB | 29 | (0) |

International career^{‡}
| 2010 | Faroe Islands U17 | 3 | (0) |
| 2011–2012 | Faroe Islands U19 | 3 | (0) |
| 2017– | Faroe Islands | 1 | (0) |
- * Club domestic league appearances and goals as of 3 July 2019 (UTC) ‡ National team caps and goals as of 3 July 2019 (UTC)

Monika Biskopstø (born 29 December 1994) is a Faroese football goalkeeper who plays for Kí and the Faroe Islands women's national football team.

== Honours ==
KÍ

- 1. deild kvinnur: 2011, 2012, 2013, 2014, 2015
- Steypakappingin kvinnur: 2012, 2013, 2014, 2015
