= Ásla Johannesen =

Faroese footballer (born 1996)

Personal information
- Full name: Ásla Johannesen
- Date of birth: 9 May 1996 (age 30)
- Place of birth: Faroe Islands,
- Position: Midfielder

Team information
- Current team: Piteå IF

Senior career*
Years	Team	Apps	(Gls)
2011	KÍ Klaksvík	3	(0)
2013	B36 Tórshavn	15	(6)
2014	AB Argir	19	(8)
2015	AB/B36	19	(4)
2016–2017	B36 Tórshavn	37	(19)
2019–2021	Nordsjælland	35	(1)
2021-2023	AGF	25	(2)
2023–	Piteå	83	(6)

International career^{‡}
2011–2012	Faroe Islands U17	6	(1)
2013–2014	Faroe Islands U19	5	(1)
2014–	Faroe Islands	19	(1)
- * Club domestic league appearances and goals as of 26 May 2023 ‡ National team caps and goals as of 18 July 2019

Ásla Johannesen (born 9 May 1996) is a Faroese footballer who plays as a midfielder for Damallsvenskan club Piteå IF and the Faroe Islands national team. She previously played for 1. deild kvinnur clubs KÍ Klasvík, B36 Tórshavn and AG Argir, and for Kvindeliga clubs FC Nordsjælland and AGF Aarhus.

== International goals ==
No.	Date	Venue	Opponent	Score	Result	Competition
1.	6 April 2017	Tórsvøllur, Tórshavn, Faroe Islands	Luxembourg	3–0	5–1	2019 FIFA Women's World Cup qualification – UEFA preliminary round
2.	10 June 2021	Alytus Stadium, Alytus, Lithuania	Estonia	1–0	1–1 (5–4 p)	2021 Baltic Women's Cup
3.	6 April 2023	Stade Achille Hammerel, Luxembourg City, Luxembourg	Luxembourg	3–2	5–5	Friendly
4.	31 May 2024	Tórsvøllur, Tórshavn, Faroe Islands	Andorra	2–0	4–0	UEFA Women's Euro 2025 qualifying
5.	16 July 2024	Estadi Nacional, Andorra la Vella, Andorra	Andorra	3–0	4–0	UEFA Women's Euro 2025 qualifying
6.	27 October 2024	Jānis Skredelis' Stadium, Riga, Latvia	Lithuania	1–0	2–1	2024 Women's Baltic Cup
7.	8 April 2025	Tórsvøllur, Torshavn, Faroe Islands	Gibraltar	4–0	5–0	2025 UEFA Women's Nations League
8.	8 April 2025	Tórsvøllur, Torshavn, Faroe Islands	Gibraltar	5–0	5–0	2025 UEFA Women's Nations League
9.	30 May 2025	Zimbru Stadium, Chișinău, Moldova	Moldova	1–0	1–1	2025 UEFA Women's Nations League
10.	3 June 2025	Tórsvøllur, Tórshavn, Faroe Islands	Slovakia	1–1	1–2	2025 UEFA Women's Nations League

== Honours ==
KÍ

- 1. deild kvinnur: 2011, 2012
- Steypakappingin kvinnur: 2012

FC Nordsjælland

- Sydbank Kvindepokalen: 2019–20
