= 2014 1. deild kvinnur =

30th season of women's league football in the Faroe Islands

1. deild kvinnur
- Season: 2014
- Matches: 60
- Goals: 273 (4.55 per match)
- Top goalscorer: Rannvá Andreasen; Heidi Sevdal (29)

The 2014 1. deild kvinnur was the 30th season of women's league football in the Faroe Islands.

The league was won by KÍ, its 15th consecutive title and 16th overall. By winning, KÍ qualified to 2015–16 UEFA Women's Champions League.

== League table ==
| Pos | Team | Pld | W | D | L | GF | GA | GD | Pts | Qualification |
|---|---|---|---|---|---|---|---|---|---|---|
| 1 | KÍ | 20 | 17 | 2 | 1 | 81 | 20 | +61 | 53 | Qualification to Champions League |
| 2 | EB/Streymur/Skála | 20 | 13 | 4 | 3 | 72 | 17 | +55 | 43 | |
| 3 | HB | 20 | 10 | 4 | 6 | 56 | 39 | +17 | 34 | |
| 4 | ÍF/Víkingur | 20 | 6 | 3 | 11 | 28 | 63 | −35 | 21 | |
| 5 | B36 | 20 | 5 | 2 | 13 | 19 | 50 | −31 | 17 | |
| 6 | AB | 20 | 1 | 1 | 18 | 17 | 84 | −67 | 4 | |

== Top scorers ==
| Rank | Scorer | Club | Goals |
|---|---|---|---|
| 1 | Rannvá Andreasen | KÍ | 29 |
| 1 | Heidi Sevdal | HB | 29 |
| 3 | Íðunn Magnussen | EB/Streymur/Skála | 14 |
| 4 | Margunn Lindholm | EB/Streymur/Skála | 12 |
| 5 | Birna Johannesen | EB/Streymur/Skála | 11 |
