= Randi Wardum =

Faroese footballer (born 1986)

Randi S. Wardum
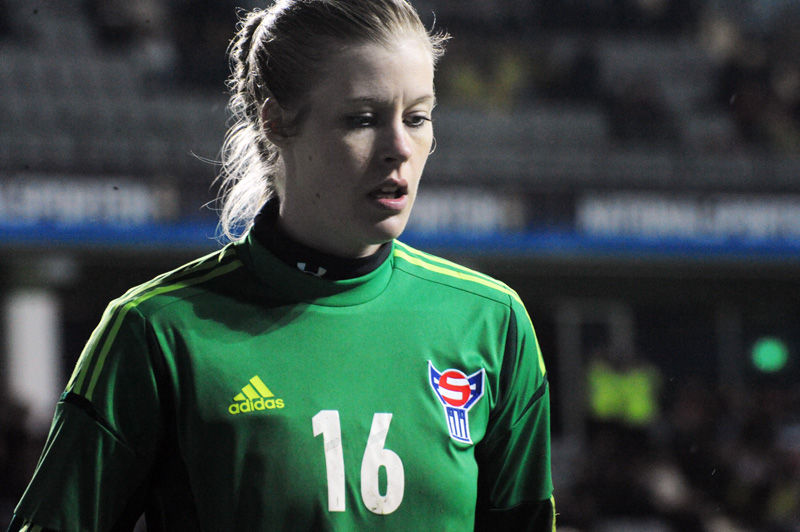
- Playing for the Faroe Islands in October 2013

Personal information
- Full name: Randi Skylvsdóttir Wardum
- Date of birth: 22 November 1986 (age 39)
- Place of birth: Tórshavn, Faroe Islands
- Position: Goalkeeper

Senior career*
Years	Team	Apps	(Gls)
2001–2003	HB	48	(1)
2004–2014	KÍ	209	(6)
2008	→ Valur (loan)	14	(0)

International career
2004–2014	Faroe Islands	38	(0)
- * Club domestic league appearances and goals

Randi Skylvsdóttir Wardum (born 22 November 1986) is a Faroese former football goalkeeper who last played for KÍ Klaksvík in the Faroese 1. deild kvinnur. From 2004 to 2014 she represented the Faroe Islands women's national football team at senior international level. In addition to football, Wardum played handball for Kyndil.

== Club career ==
In April 2008 Wardum signed for Icelandic Úrvalsdeild champions Valur. She became the first female footballer from the Faroe Islands to play for a foreign club. In September 2008 she was in the Valur team who retained their title with an 8–0 win over Stjarnan.

Wardum made 27 appearances for KÍ in the UEFA Women's Champions League, formerly known as the UEFA Women's Cup.

== International career ==
The Faroe Islands Football Association (FSF) relaunched their senior women's national team in 2004 after an eight-year hiatus. Wardum kept goal in their first match, a 2–1 friendly defeat to Ireland. The match was staged in Klaksvík on 12 October 2004, the day before the nations' senior men's teams met at Lansdowne Road, Dublin.

She played in all five games as the Faroe Islands won the football tournament at the 2005 Island Games in Shetland.

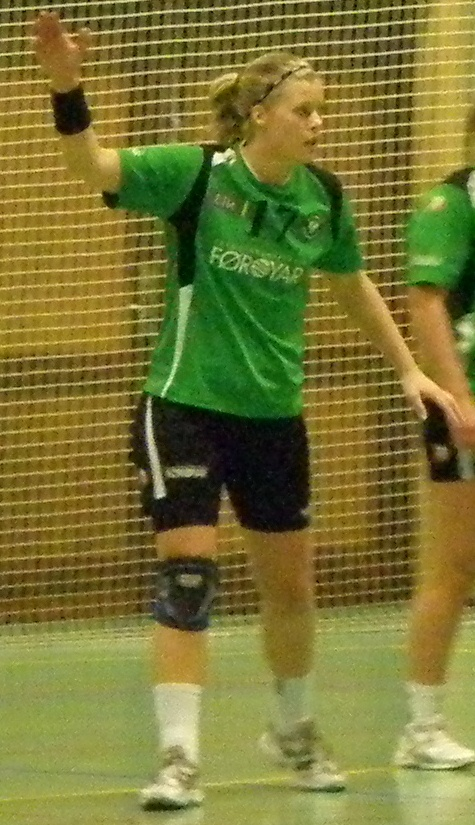
Playing for Kyndil in 2012

In 2012, Wardum and her KÍ teammates Malena Josephsen and Rannvá B. Andreasen simultaneously became the first Faroese women to win 25 caps.

== Handball ==
Wardum is also an accomplished handballer. She played, outfield, for Kyndil and was part of the Faroe Islands women's national handball team.
