= Lív Poulsen =

Faroese footballer (born 1997)

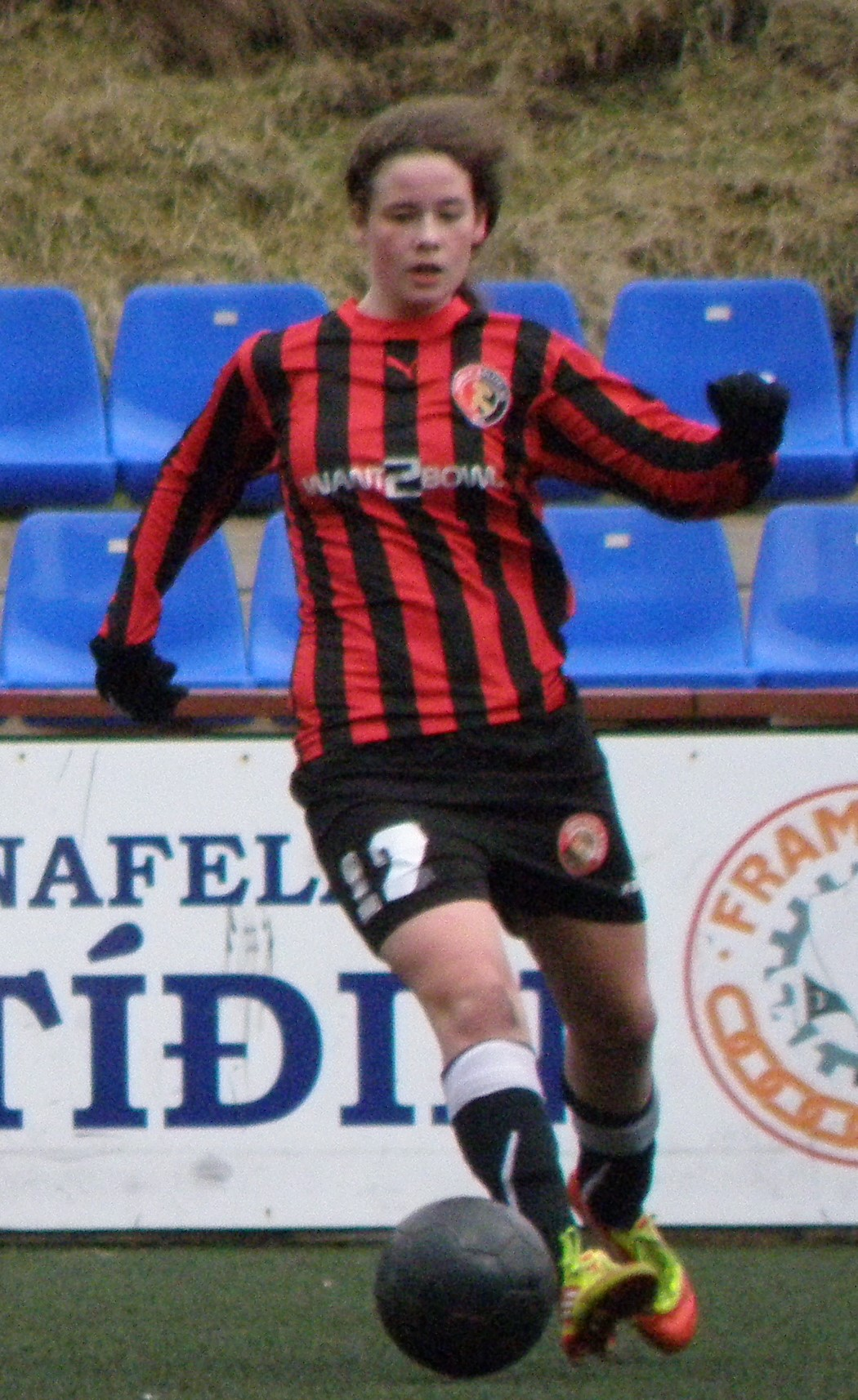
- Lív Poulsen in 2012.

Personal information
- Full name: Lív Finnbogadóttir Arge Poulsen
- Birth name: Lív Finnbogadóttir Arge
- Date of birth: 20 March 1997 (age 29)
- Place of birth: Tórshavn, Faroe Islands
- Position: Midfielder

Senior career*
Years	Team	Apps	(Gls)
2011–2016	HB	101	(41)
–2018	Østerbro		
2018–2019	Nordsjælland		
2019–2020	Sundby		

International career^{‡}
2012–2013	Faroe Islands U17	9	(3)
2014–2015	Faroe Islands U19	13	(0)
2013–	Faroe Islands	31	(2)
- * Club domestic league appearances and goals as of 8 October 2016 ‡ National team caps and goals as of 9 March 2020

Lív Finnbogadóttir Arge Poulsen (née Finnbogadóttir Arge; born 20 March 1997) is a Faroese football midfielder who currently plays for Havnar Bóltfelag.

== Honours ==
Havnar Bóltfelag

Runners-up

- Faroese Women's Cup: 2014

== International goals ==
Scores and results list Faroe Islands' goal tally first.

#	Date	Venue	Opponent	Score	Result	Competition	Source
1	6 April 2015	Victor Tedesco Stadium, Ħamrun, Malta	Andorra	8–0	8–0	UEFA Women's Euro 2017 qualifying preliminary round	
2	6 April 2017	Tórsvøllur, Tórshavn, Faroe Islands	Luxembourg	4–0	5–1	2019 FIFA Women's World Cup qualification – UEFA preliminary round	
