= Sarita Mittfoss =

Faroese footballer

Personal information
- Full name: Sarita Maria Mittfoss
- Date of birth: 4 September 1999 (age 27)
- Place of birth: Faroe Islands,
- Height: 1.68 m (5 ft 6 in)
- Position: Defender

Team information
- Current team: HB

Senior career*
Years	Team	Apps	(Gls)
2014-2017	B36	43	(10)
2018	HB	19	(0)
2019	B36	14	(6)
2020-	HB	77	(9)

International career^{‡}
	Faroe Islands	14	(0)
- * Club domestic league appearances and goals as of 21 September 2023 (UTC) ‡ National team caps and goals as of 21 September 2023 (UTC)

Sarita Mittfoss (born 4 September 1999) is a Faroese footballer who plays as a defender and has appeared for the Faroe Islands women's national team.

== Career ==
Mittfoss has been capped for the Faroe Islands national team, appearing for the team during the 2019 FIFA Women's World Cup qualifying cycle.
