= Valborg Østerø =

Faroese footballer (born 2002)

Personal information
- Date of birth: 6 October 2002 (age 24)
- Place of birth: Tórshavn, Faroe Islands
- Position: Goalkeeper

Team information
- Current team: B36 Tórshavn
- Number: 1

Senior career*
Years	Team	Apps	(Gls)
2020-	B36 Tórshavn	129	(0)

International career^{‡}
2022-	Faroe Islands	7	(0)
- * Club domestic league appearances and goals as of 18 November 2024 ‡ National team caps and goals as of 11:00, 18 November 2024 (UTC)

Valborg Østerø (born 6 October 2002) is a Faroese footballer who plays as a goalkeeper for B36 Tórshavn and the Faroe Islands women's team.

== Club career ==
Valborg Østerø has played her entire senior career in B36 Tórshavn. She became goalkeeper by coincidence in her late teens, and soon revealed that she had an extraordinary talent.

In 2022 she was in the center of a rare act of fairplay. In a match against NSÍ Runavík the referee gave her a red card for picking up the ball outside the penalty area. When the NSÍ players prepared to take the following freekick they told the referee that he had made a mistake by giving the freekick and the red card. Then the referee decided to reverse his decision. He took back the red card, and converted the freekick to a drop ball.

== International career ==
Valborg Østerø made her international debut for the Faroe Islands women's team on 20 February 2022 in a friendly match against Gibraltar, which finished in a 1–0 victory. She is currently reserve keeper on the Faroe Islands women's team.
