= Sanna Svarvadal =

Faroese footballer (born 2001)

Personal information
- Full name: Sanna Judith Frida Svarvadal
- Date of birth: 14 November 2001 (age 24)
- Place of birth: Faroe Islands,
- Position: Defender

Team information
- Current team: KÍ
- Number: 10

Senior career*
Years	Team	Apps	(Gls)
2017–	KÍ	122	(21)

International career^{‡}
2016–2017	Faroe Islands U17	14	(0)
2018–2019	Faroe Islands U19	9	(0)
2019–	Faroe Islands	13	(0)
- * Club domestic league appearances and goals as of 21 September 2023 ‡ National team caps and goals as of 21 September 2023

Sanna Judith Frida Svarvadal (born 14 November 2001) is a Faroese footballer who plays as a defender for 1. deild kvinnur club Klaksvíkar Ítróttarfelag and the Faroe Islands women's national team.

== Club career ==
Svarvadal has played for KÍ in the Faroe Islands.

== International career ==
Svarvadal made her senior debut for the Faroe Islands on 3 September 2019. She capped during the UEFA Women's Euro 2022 qualifying.
