= Jóna Nicolajsen =

Faroese footballer (born 1986)

Personal information
- Date of birth: May 16, 1986 (age 40)
- Place of birth: Faroe Islands
- Position: Goalkeeper

Team information
- Current team: B36 Tórshavn

Senior career*
Years	Team	Apps	(Gls)
2015	AB / B36	7	(0)
2016–	B36 Tórshavn	62	(0)

International career^{‡}
2018–	Faroe Islands	2	(0)
- * Club domestic league appearances and goals as of 3 July 2019 (UTC) ‡ National team caps and goals as of 3 July 2019 (UTC)

Jóna Nicolajsen (born 16 May 1986) is a Faroese football goalkeeper. She plays for B36 Tórshavn and the Faroe Islands women's national football team.
