= Jónvá Hentze =

Faroese footballer

Personal information
- Date of birth: 11 February 1998 (age 28)
- Place of birth: Faroe Islands,
- Positions: Defender; midfielder

Team information
- Current team: HB

Senior career*
Years	Team	Apps	(Gls)
2015-2021	HB	120	(9)

International career^{‡}
- Faroe Islands
- * Club domestic league appearances and goals as of 21 September 2023 (UTC) ‡ National team caps and goals as of 19:37, 30 August 2019 (UTC)

Jónvá Hentze (born 11 February 1998) is a Faroese footballer who plays as a midfielder and has appeared for the Faroe Islands women's national team.

== Career ==
Hentze has been capped for the Faroe Islands national team, appearing for the team during the 2019 FIFA Women's World Cup qualifying cycle.
