= Rebekka Benbakoura =

Faroese footballer (born 1999)

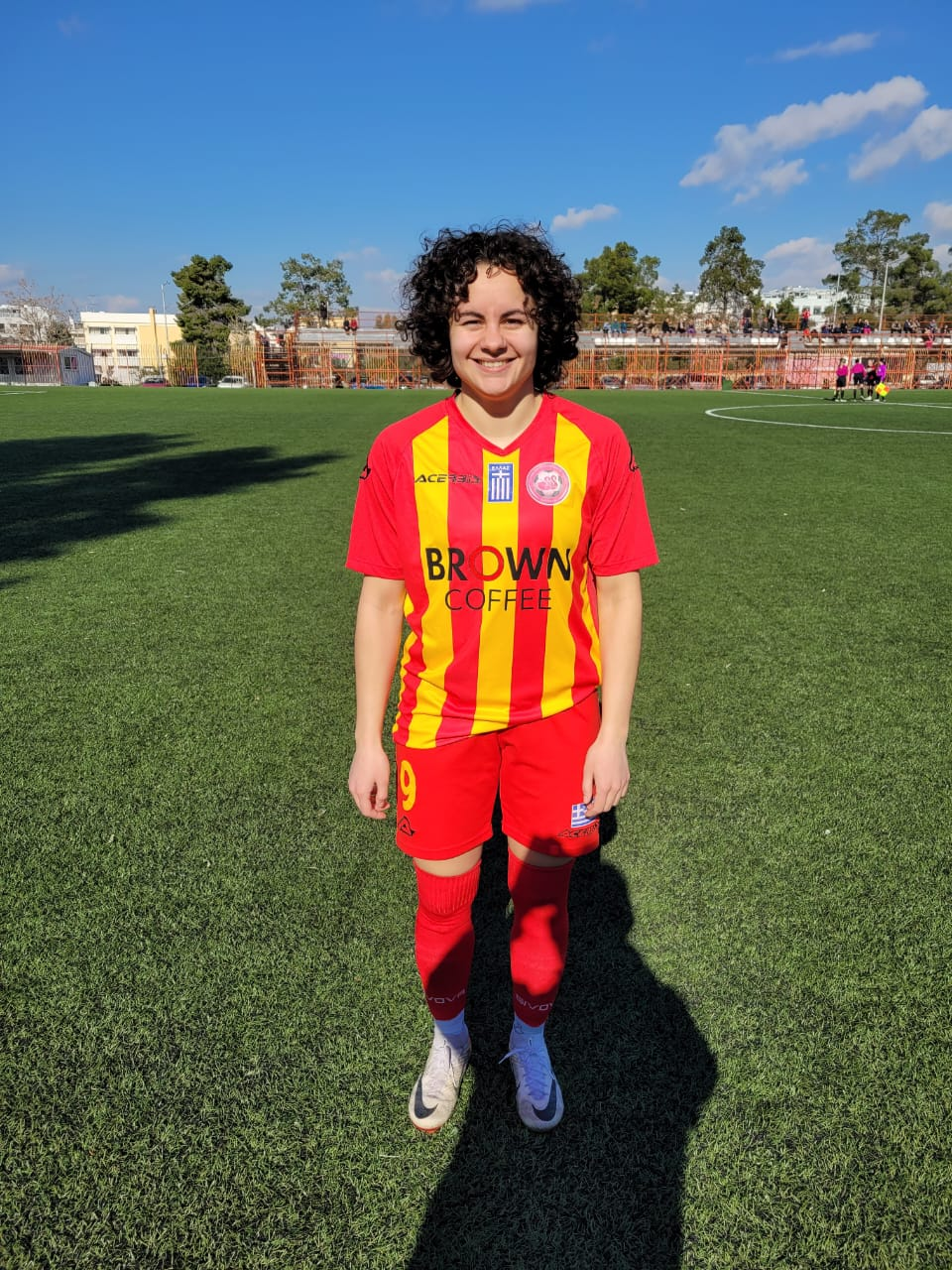
- Benbakoura with Kastoria in 2024

Personal information
- Full name: Rebekka Fjálsá Benbakoura
- Date of birth: 5 January 1999 (age 27)
- Place of birth: Faroe Islands
- Height: 1.59 m (5 ft 3 in)
- Position: Forward

Team information
- Current team: HB

Senior career*
Years	Team	Apps	(Gls)
2014–2022	HB	84	(42)
2023	KÍ	20	(21)
2024	Kastoria	12	(3)
2024–	HB	2	(1)

International career^{‡}
	Faroe Islands	20	(0)
- * Club domestic league appearances and goals as of 14 August 2024 ‡ National team caps and goals as of 16 January 2024 (UTC)

Rebekka Fjallsá Benbakoura (born 5 January 1999) is a Faroese footballer who plays as a forward for the 1. deild kvinnur club HB and the Faroe Islands women's national team.

== Early life ==
Benbakoura was born on 5 January 1999 in the Faroe Islands to an Algerian father, who was raised in Belgium, and a Faroese mother.

== Career ==
Benbakoura has earned caps for the Faroe Islands national team, representing the country during the 2019 FIFA Women's World Cup qualifying cycle.

== Personal life ==
Benbakoura's father converted from Islam to Protestantism. Her parents met in 1996 in Brussels, where her father was working in a hotel and her mother was visiting her sister. The couple moved to the Faroe Islands and married there in 1998, just a year before Benbakoura's birth.
