= Jákup Andreasen =

Faroese footballer

Personal information
- Full name: Jákup Biskopstø Andreasen
- Date of birth: 31 May 1998 (age 28)
- Place of birth: Faroe Islands
- Position: Midfielder

Team information
- Current team: KÍ
- Number: 8

Youth career
- –2016: KÍ

Senior career*
Years	Team	Apps	(Gls)
2014–2015	KÍ II	13	(0)
2014–	KÍ	258	(25)

International career^{‡}
2013–2014	U17 Faroe Islands	11	(0)
2015–2016	U19 Faroe Islands	6	(0)
2016–2019	U21 Faroe Islands	15	(2)
2020–	Faroe Islands	37	(3)
- * Club domestic league appearances and goals as of 1 November 2026 ‡ National team caps and goals as of 16 November 2026 (UTC)

Jákup Biskopstø Andreasen (born 31 May 1998) is a Faroese footballer who plays as a midfielder for KÍ and the Faroe Islands national team. He is the nephew of Faroese international footballers Ragna Patawary and Rannvá Andreasen, and the older brother of fellow KÍ player Dávid.

== Career ==
Andreasen made his international debut for the Faroe Islands on 6 September 2020 in the UEFA Nations League against Andorra, which finished as a 1–0 away win.

== Career statistics ==
=== International ===
As of match played 9 July 2026

Faroe Islands
Year	Apps	Goals
2020	1	0
2021	7	0
2022	6	2
2023	10	0
2024	0	0
2025	8	0
2026	3	1
Total	35	3

== International goals ==
Scores and results list Faros Islands's goal tally first.

No.	Date	Venue	Opponent	Score	Result	Competition
1.	11 June 2022	Tórsvøllur, Tórshavn, Faroe Islands	Lithuania	2–1	2–1	2022–23 UEFA Nations League
2.	22 September 2022	LFF Stadium, Vinius, Lithuania	Lithuania	1–0	1–1	2022–23 UEFA Nations League
3.	28 March 2026	San Marino Stadium, Serravalle, San Marino	San Marino	1–1	2–1	Friendly

== Personal life ==
Andreasen works as a ship crew member while also playing football. Faroese footballing twins Rannvá Andreasen and Ragna Patawary are his paternal aunts.
