= Ragna Patawary =

Faroese footballer (born 1980)

Personal information
- Full name: Ragna Biskopstø Patawary
- Birth name: Ragna Biskopstø Andreasen
- Date of birth: 10 November 1980 (age 46)
- Place of birth: Klaksvík, Faroe Islands
- Position: Defender

Team information
- Current team: KÍ
- Number: 7

Senior career*
Years	Team	Apps	(Gls)
1995-	KÍ	177	(8)

International career^{‡}
1997–1998	Faroe Islands U18	5	(0)
–2011	Faroe Islands	6+	(0+)
- * Club domestic league appearances and goals as of 21 September 2023 ‡ National team caps and goals as of 8 March 2011

Ragna Biskopstø Patawary (née Andreasen; born 10 November 1980) is a Faroese footballer who plays as a defender for Klaksvíkar Ítróttarfelag. She has been a member of the Faroe Islands women's national team. She is the twin sister of fellow Faroese international footballer Rannvá Andreasen and aunt of Faroese international footballer Jákup Andreasen.
