= Eyðvør Klakstein =

Faroese footballer (born 1995)

Personal information
- Full name: Eyðvør Klakstein
- Date of birth: September 5, 1995 (age 31)
- Place of birth: Faroe Islands
- Position: Midfielder

Team information
- Current team: KÍ
- Number: 10

Senior career*
Years	Team	Apps	(Gls)
2010–2015	KÍ	80	(24)
2015–2016	CD Marino	12	(8)
2016-2017	KÍ	20	(8)
2017	Mislata CF	0	(0)
2018-	KÍ	89	(42)

International career^{‡}
2010–2011	Faroe Islands U17	6	(0)
2011–2013	Faroe Islands U19	9	(2)
2013–	Faroe Islands	67	(6)
- * Club domestic league appearances and goals as of 21 September 2023 (UTC) ‡ National team caps and goals as of 9 October 2026

Eyðvør Klakstein (born 5 September 1995) is a Faroese football midfielder who currently plays for KÍ. From August 2015 until May 2016 she was playing for CD Marino in the second best football division in Spain.

== Honours ==
KÍ

Winner

- 1. deild kvinnur (9): 2010, 2011, 2012, 2013, 2014, 2015, 2016, 2019, 2020,
- Faroese Women's Cup (7): 2010, 2012, 2013, 2014, 2015, 2016, 2020,

== International goals ==
Scores and results list Faroe Islands' goal tally first.

#	Date	Venue	Opponent	Score	Result	Competition	Source
1	5 April 2014	Tórsvøllur, Tórshavn, Faroe Islands	Bosnia and Herzegovina	1–1	1–1	2015 FIFA Women's World Cup qualification	
2	7 November 2016	Stade Albert-Kongs, Itzig, Luxembourg	Luxembourg	1–1	1–1	Friendly	
3	6 April 2017	Tórsvøllur, Tórshavn, Faroe Islands	Luxembourg	2–0	5–1	2019 FIFA Women's World Cup qualification	
4	8 April 2017	Tórsvøllur, Tórshavn, Faroe Islands	Montenegro	1–1	2–1	2019 FIFA Women's World Cup qualification	
5	16 July 2024	Estadi Nacional, Andorra la Vella, Andorra	Andorra	2–0	4–0	UEFA Women's Euro 2025 qualifying	
6	8 April 2025	Tórsvøllur, Tórshavn, Faroe Islands	Gibraltar	1–0	5–0	2025 UEFA Women's Nations League C	
