= Milja Simonsen =

Faroese footballer

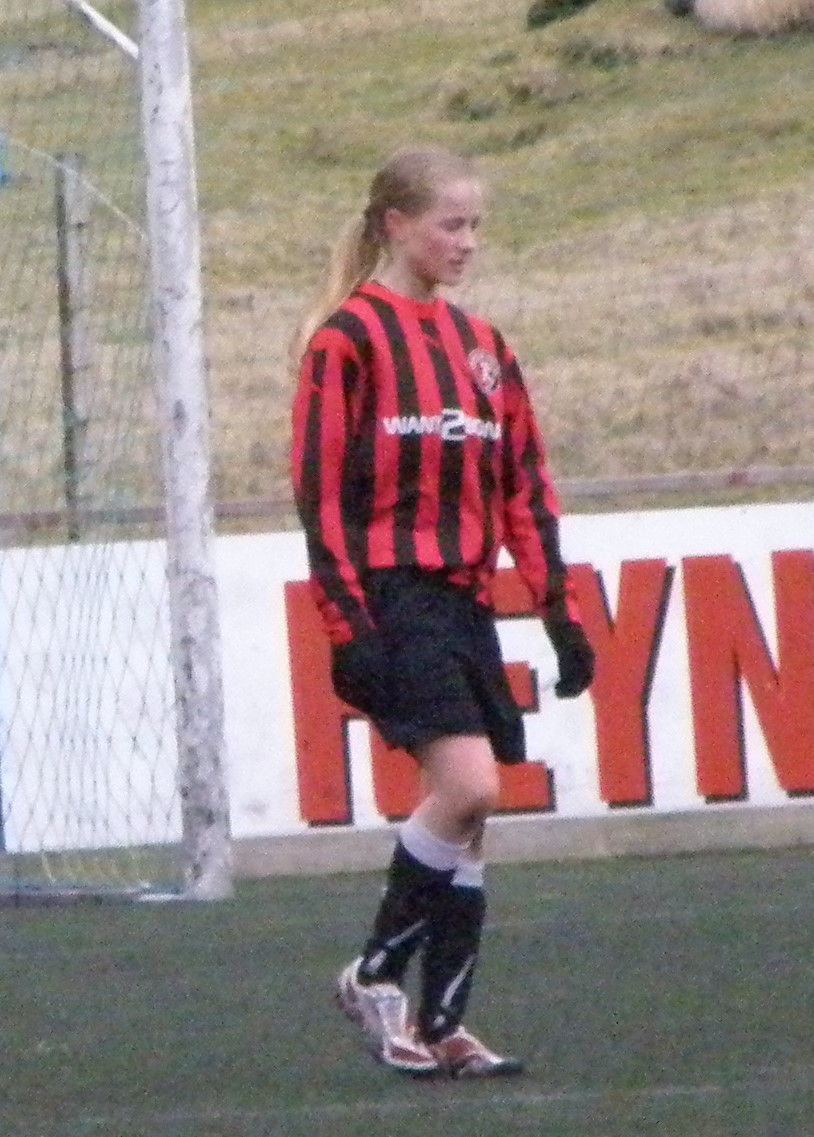

Personal information
- Full name: Milja Reinert Simonsen
- Date of birth: 11 January 1997 (age 29)
- Place of birth: Tórshavn, Faroe Islands
- Position: Forward

Team information
- Current team: HB

Senior career*
Years	Team	Apps	(Gls)
2011–2018	HB	125	(105)

International career^{‡}
2012–2013	Faroe Islands U17	6	(0)
2014–	Faroe Islands U19	3	(2)
2014–	Faroe Islands	14	(2)
- * Club domestic league appearances and goals as of 4 May 2020 ‡ National team caps and goals as of 11 April 2017

Milja Reinert Simonsen (born 11 January 1997) is a Faroese football forward who currently plays for Havnar Bóltfelag.

== Honours ==
Havnar Bóltfelag

Runners-up

- Faroese Women's Cup: 2014

== International goals ==
Scores and results list Faroe Islands' goal tally first.

#	Date	Venue	Opponent	Score	Result	Competition	Source
1	9 April 2015	Victor Tedesco Stadium, Ħamrun, Malta	Malta	2–0	4–2	UEFA Women's Euro 2017 qualifying preliminary round	
2	11 April 2017	Tórsvøllur, Tórshavn, Faroe Islands	Turkey	2–1	2–1	2019 FIFA Women's World Cup qualification – UEFA preliminary round	
