= Margunn Lindholm =

Faroese footballer

Personal information
- Date of birth: 16 April 1996 (age 30)
- Place of birth: Faroe Islands
- Position: Midfielder

Team information
- Current team: NSÍ Runavík

Senior career*
Years	Team	Apps	(Gls)
2011–2012	B68 / NSÍ	21	(7)
2013–2019	EB/Streymur/Skála	100	(79)
2020–	NSÍ Runavík	14	(3)

International career^{‡}
2011–2012	Faroe Islands U-17	6	(0)
2013–2014	Faroe Islands U-19	8	(0)
2014–2020	Faroe Islands	16	(0)
- * Club domestic league appearances and goals as of 19 February 2022 (UTC) ‡ National team caps and goals as of 19 February 2022 (UTC)

Margunn Lindholm (born 16 April 1996) is a Faroese footballer who plays as a midfielder and has appeared for the Faroe Islands women's national team.

== Club career ==
Lindholm started her career playing for the second division side B68/NSÍ.

She was an important player for EB/Streymur/Skála, being the club's topscorer in the 2015, 2016 and 2018 seasons. In the 2018 Faroese Cup Final she scored a famous free-kick wondergoal against HB to win the club's second consecutive cup title, with her team down to 10 players.

In 2020 she moved to NSÍ Runavík.

== International career ==
Lindholm has been capped for the Faroese national team, being part of the team that won the 2016 Baltic Cup and appearing for the team during the 2015 and 2019 FIFA Women's World Cup qualifying cycles.

== Honours ==
=== Club ===
==== EBS/Skála ====
- 1. deild kvinnur: 2017, 2018
- Faroese Women's Cup: 2017, 2018

==== NSÍ Runavík ====
- Faroese Women's Cup: 2021

=== National team ===
- Women's Baltic Cup: 2016

=== Individual ===
- Faroese Best Women's Player: 2018
