= Laila Pætursdóttir =

Faroese footballer

Personal information
- Date of birth: 12 July 1990 (age 36)
- Position: Midfielder

International career^{‡}
Years	Team	Apps	(Gls)
- Faroe Islands
- ‡ National team caps and goals as of 19:38, 30 August 2019 (UTC)

Laila Pætursdóttir (born 12 July 1990) is a Faroese footballer who plays as a midfielder and has appeared for the Faroe Islands women's national team.

== Career ==
Pætursdóttir has been capped for the Faroe Islands national team, appearing for the team during the 2019 FIFA Women's World Cup qualifying cycle.
