= Maria Thomsen =

Faroese footballer

Personal information
- Full name: Maria Klakkstein Thomson
- Date of birth: 7 May 1995 (age 31)
- Place of birth: Faroe Islands,
- Position: Midfielder

Team information
- Current team: Kí
- Number: 10

Senior career*
Years	Team	Apps	(Gls)
2010-2018	Kí	148	(120)
2019	B36	5	(0)
2019	Kí	5	(2)

International career^{‡}
- Faroe Islands
- * Club domestic league appearances and goals as of 17:40, 4 May 2020 (UTC) ‡ National team caps and goals as of 19:38, 30 August 2019 (UTC)

Maria Thomsen (born 7 May 1995) is a Faroese footballer who plays as a midfielder and has appeared for the Faroe Islands women's national team.

== Career ==
Thomsen has been capped for the Faroe Islands national team, appearing for the team during the 2019 FIFA Women's World Cup qualifying cycle.
