= Argja Bóltfelag (women) =

Faroese women's association football club

AB Argir
- Full name: Argja Bóltfelag
- Nicknames: AB; Frensurin
- Founded: August 15, 1973
- Ground: Vika Stadium; Argir, Faroes
- Capacity: 2,000
- Chairman: Marius Thomassen
- Manager: Johan M. Stenberg
- League: 2. deild kvinnur
- 2019: 3rd
Home colours	Away colours

Argja Bóltfelag is a Faroese football club based in Argir.

The women's team of Argja Bóltfelag play in the 1. deild kvinnur in 2020, the second division in Faroese football. They play their home games at Vika Stadium, in Argir.

== History ==
Argja Bóltfelag (or AB) was founded on 15 August 1973 by Danish resident Johnny Nyby and other football lovers on Argir. In the spring of 1974 AB got a board, composed of Johnny Nyby, Chairman; Fróði Olsen, Co-Chairman; Sonja á Argjaboða, accountant; and Kristian Arge, board writer. Other members of the board were Erling Olsen, Sæmundur Mortensen and Jens Hansen. In the same year the team started in the regular competition.

Vika Stadium AB scores against B36 Tórshavn

They had poor training facilities at first – they trained in a school yard. Later they got a small ground to train on, but it was only 20 x 40 m^{2}. There was no football field on Argir at the time, but they were allowed to loan the field Gundadalur, which belongs to HB and B36. AB practiced and played their matches in Gundadalur, and this helped the team to survive.

In 1983 a football field was built on Argjum. This helped the team a lot, because they had their own field. In 1985 a new two-stores house was built for AB. AB did get the lower store, and the second store was a school classroom.

For some years, the second store remained a kindergarten school. In 1998 artificial grass was put on the football field, and the team had the same training facility as the rest of the football teams in the Faroes. In 2004 AB had grown enough to get the whole house.

In the summer of 2009, they are building seats for the fans to sit down, AB have never had seats, and that is the rules from FIFA.

=== Recent history ===
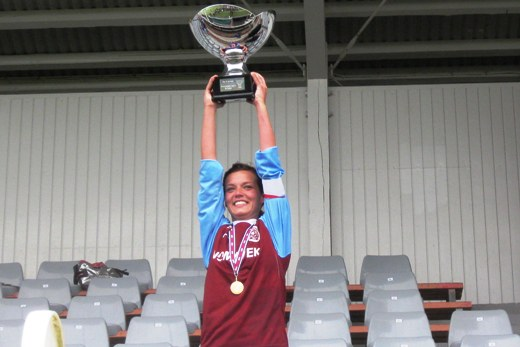
Gundadalur Stadium Asta Magnussen, Capitan, holding the Cup

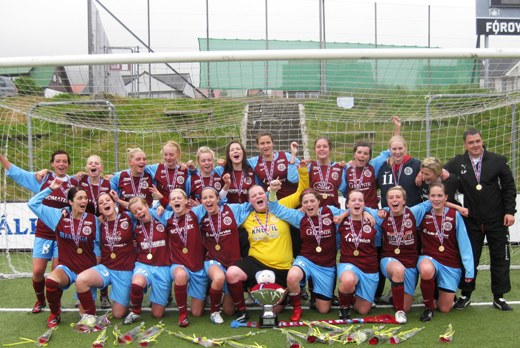
Gundadalur Stadium AB Cup Winners 2009

In 2009 AB had a chance to win cup final, it was against record cup winner KÍ Klaksvík. AB made history and they won the cup for the first time. The result was 2–1 to AB, Mona Brekkman scored the first goal to make it 1–0, then KÍ Klaksvík equalized, but Brekkman scored again and the final score was 2–1 to AB.

In 2011 they again reached the cup final, but this time lost 1–0 to KI.

== First-team squad ==
=== Current squad ===
The former team: Note: Flags indicate national team as defined under FIFA eligibility rules; some limited exceptions apply. Players may hold more than one non-FIFA nationality.

No.	Pos.	Nation	Player
1	GK	FRO	Simona Heinesen
2	DF	FRO	Rudi Rasmussen
3	DF	FRO	Hellen Haraldsen
4	FW	FRO	Ásleyg Súnadóttir
5	DF	FRO	Jytta Drangstein
5	DF	FRO	Vilhelmina Olsen
5	MF	FRO	Barbara Danielsen
5	MF	FRO	Rannvá Jarnskor Gray
6	DF	FRO	Valgerð Andreassen
7	DF	FRO	Rakul Jógvansdóttir
8	DF	FRO	Liljan av Fløtum Petersen
8	DF	FRO	Durita S. Jørgensen
9	FW	FRO	Mona Breckmann
9	FW	FRO	Elsa Jacobsen
10	MF	FRO	Olga Kristina Hansen

No.	Pos.	Nation	Player
11	MF	FRO	Steintóra G. Joensen
11	MF	FRO	Sandra Joensen
13	MF	FRO	Lisa í Liða
14	MF	FRO	Barbara á Dunga
15	DF	FRO	Doris í Garði Joensen
16	MF	FRO	Katarina Saxov
18	FW	FRO	Halltóra Joensen
19	FW	FRO	Anja R. Joensen
21	MF	FRO	Bjørt Miðberg
22	GK	FRO	Anny Thorsen
—	DF	FRO	Elin S. Holm
—	MF	FRO	Rannvá Poulsen
—	MF	FRO	Bjørg Syderbø
—	MF	FRO	Elin Katrina Thomsen
—	DF	FRO	Asta Magnussen

== Technical staff ==
As of 2020.

Manager:	(Faroe Islands) Johan M. Stenberg ( 2019, 2020 -)
Assistant manager:	(Faroe Islands)
Manager Under 18s:	(Faroe Islands) Tonny Brimsvík
