= Heidi Sevdal =

Faroese footballer (born 1989)

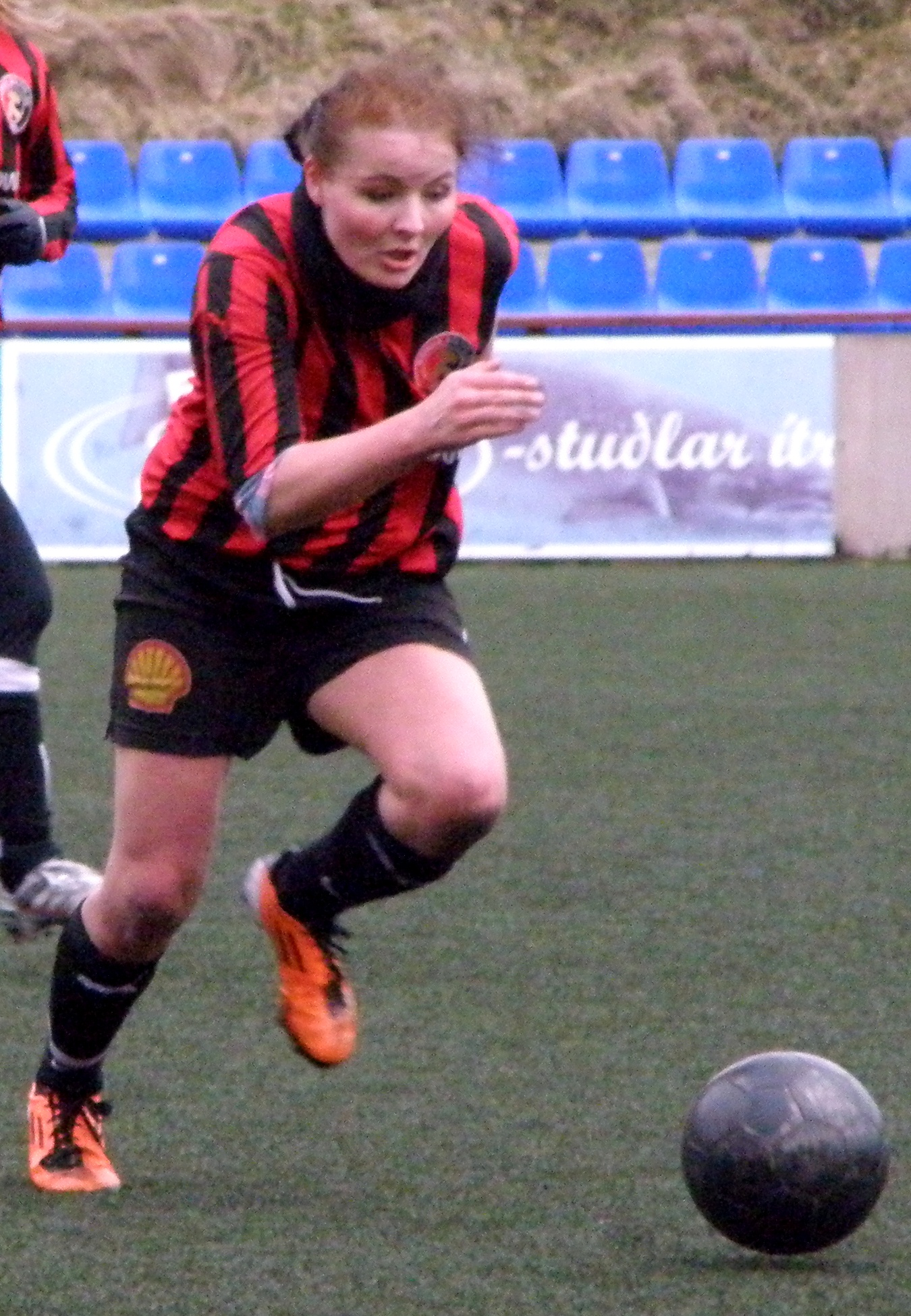
- Playing for HB in 2012

Personal information
- Full name: Heidi Sevdal
- Date of birth: March 6, 1989 (age 37)
- Place of birth: Runavík, Faroe Islands
- Position: Forward

Team information
- Current team: NSÍ

Senior career*
Years	Team	Apps	(Gls)
2005	GÍ Gøta	10	(3)
2006	NSÍ Runavík	14	(7)
2007–2008	B36 Tórshavn	22	(18)
2009–2011	Víkingur Gøta	35	(34)
2012–2016	HB	77	(105)
2017	EB/Streymur/Skála	19	(33)
2018–2019	HB	36	(48)
2020-	NSÍ	120	(154)

International career^{‡}
2005–2007	Faroe Islands U-19	9	(4)
2006–	Faroe Islands	104	(32)
- * Club domestic league appearances and goals as of 20 September 2023 ‡ National team caps and goals as of 12 October 2026

Heidi Sevdal (born 6 March 1989) is a Faroese football forward who currently plays for NSÍ, after representing various other teams in the Faroese 1. deild kvinnur. Since 2006, she has represented the Faroe Islands women's national football team at senior international level.

== Club career ==
Sevdal spent time at the Danish A-Liga club IK Skovbakken in 2006.

In November 2013 Sevdal was named the Faroese women's footballer of the Year after scoring 30 goals for HB Tórshavn. In 2015, she was named player of the year once again. In 2017, along with Adeshina Lawal, she was rewarded for finishing as top scorer and chosen striker of the year in Faroese football.

== International career ==
Sevdal's first appearances for the senior Faroe Islands women's national football team came in November 2006, at the UEFA Women's Euro 2009 qualifying series. At a preliminary round mini-tournament held in Strumica, Macedonia, Malena Josephsen's injury time goal in the Faroe Islands' first match was not enough, as they lost 2–1 to Wales. The team was eliminated after another defeat, 1–0 to Kazakhstan. In the final match the Faroe Islands beat hosts Macedonia 7–0. Sevdal started the first two matches and came on a substitute in the third.

In September 2013, with the Faroe Islands seven goals down to Scotland in a 2015 Women's World Cup qualifier at Tórsvøllur, Sevdal scored two late consolation goals.

== International goals ==
Scores and results list Faroe Islands' goal tally first.

#	Date	Venue	Opponent	Score	Result	Competition	Source
1	25 October 2008	ARVI Football Arena, Marijampolė, Lithuania	Lithuania	2–1	4–1	UEFA friendly competition	
2	27 October 2008	ARVI Football Arena, Marijampolė, Lithuania	Luxembourg	1–0	6–2	UEFA friendly competition	
3	27 October 2008	ARVI Football Arena, Marijampolė, Lithuania	Luxembourg	3–1	6–2	UEFA friendly competition	
4	15 May 2008	Luxembourg, Luxembourg	Luxembourg	4–1	4–2	UEFA friendly competition	
5	11 April 2009	Sportski park Podravac, Virje, Croatia	Croatia	1–1	3–1	UEFA friendly competition	
6	13 April 2009	NK Pitomača, Pitomača, Croatia	Bosnia and Herzegovina	2–2	2–3	UEFA friendly competition	
7	16 April 2009	Gradski stadion, Križevci, Croatia	Lithuania	2–1	3–1	UEFA friendly competition	
8	4 April 2013	LFF Stadium, Vilnius, Lithuania	Montenegro	1–1	3–3	2015 FIFA Women's World Cup Qual. - UEFA Preliminary Round	
9	4 April 2013	LFF Stadium, Vilnius, Lithuania	Montenegro	3–3	3–3	2015 FIFA Women's World Cup Qual. - UEFA Preliminary Round	
10	9 April 2013	LFF Stadium, Vilnius, Lithuania	Georgia	1–0	2–1	2015 FIFA Women's World Cup Qual. - UEFA Preliminary Round	
11	9 April 2013	LFF Stadium, Vilnius, Lithuania	Georgia	2–1	2–1	2015 FIFA Women's World Cup Qual. - UEFA Preliminary Round	
12	22 September 2013	Tórsvøllur, Tórshavn, Faroe Islands	Scotland	1–7	2–7	2015 FIFA Women's World Cup qualification – UEFA Group 4	
13	22 September 2013	Tórsvøllur, Tórshavn, Faroe Islands	Scotland	2–7	2–7	2015 FIFA Women's World Cup qualification – UEFA Group 4	
14	6 April 2015	Victor Tedesco Stadium, Ħamrun, Malta	Andorra	3–0	8–0	UEFA Women's Euro 2017 qualifying preliminary round	
15	6 April 2015	Victor Tedesco Stadium, Ħamrun, Malta	Andorra	4–0	8–0	UEFA Women's Euro 2017 qualifying preliminary round	
16	9 April 2015	Victor Tedesco Stadium, Ħamrun, Malta	Malta	3–2	4–2	UEFA Women's Euro 2017 qualifying preliminary round	
17	9 April 2015	Victor Tedesco Stadium, Ħamrun, Malta	Malta	4–2	4–2	UEFA Women's Euro 2017 qualifying preliminary round	
18	6 April 2017	Tórsvøllur, Tórshavn, Faroe Islands	Luxembourg	1–0	5–1	2019 FIFA Women's World Cup qualification (UEFA)	
19	6 April 2017	Tórsvøllur, Tórshavn, Faroe Islands	Luxembourg	5–0	5–1	2019 FIFA Women's World Cup qualification (UEFA)	
20	7 April 2019	Darius and Girėnas Stadium, Kaunas, Lithuania	Lithuania	1–0	2–2	UEFA friendly competition	
21	7 April 2019	Darius and Girėnas Stadium, Kaunas, Lithuania	Lithuania	2–2	2–2	UEFA friendly competition	
22	25 June 2022	við Djúpumýrar, Klaksvík, Faroe Islands	Andorra	3–1	3–1	UEFA friendly competition	
23	6 October 2022	Võru Sports Centre Stadium, Võru, Estonia	Latvia	1–0	3–2	2022 Baltic Women's Cup	
24	5 April 2023	Stade Achille Hammerel, Luxembourg City, Luxembourg	Luxembourg	1–0	5–5	UEFA friendly competition	
25	5 April 2023	Stade Achille Hammerel, Luxembourg City, Luxembourg	Luxembourg	2–2	5–5	UEFA friendly competition	
26	8 April 2023	Stade Georges Wohlfart, Hosingen, Luxembourg	Luxembourg	1–0	1–2	UEFA friendly competition	
27	12 July 2024	Tórsvøllur, Tórshavn, Faroe Islands	Montenegro	1–0	2–1	UEFA friendly competition	
28	27 October 2024	Jānis Skredelis' Stadium, Riga, Latvia	Lithuania	2–1	2–1	2024 Baltic Women's Cup	
29	25 February 2025	Europa Point Stadium, Gibraltar	Gibraltar	1–0	1–0	2025 UEFA Women's Nations League C	
30	4 April 2025	Tórsvøllur, Tórshavn, Faroe Islands	Moldova	2–0	2–0	2025 UEFA Women's Nations League C	
31	8 April 2025	Tórsvøllur, Tórshavn, Faroe Islands	Gibraltar	3–0	5–0	2025 UEFA Women's Nations League C	
32	12 October 2026	Estadi Nacional, Andorra la Vella, Andorra	Andorra	1–1	1–2	UEFA friendly competition	
