= Malena Josephsen =

Faroese footballer (born 1977)

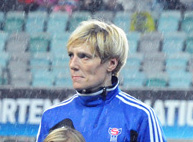
- Playing for the Faroe Islands in October 2013

Personal information
- Full name: Malena Josephsen
- Date of birth: 3 January 1977 (age 49)
- Place of birth: Klaksvík, Faroe Islands
- Position: Midfielder

Team information
- Current team: KÍ
- Number: 8

Senior career*
Years	Team	Apps	(Gls)
1994–	KÍ	446	(328)

International career^{‡}
2004–2015	Faroe Islands	41	(10)
- * Club domestic league appearances and goals as of 20 September 2023 ‡ National team caps and goals as of 9 April 2017

Malena Josephsen (born 3 January 1977) is a Faroese football midfielder who captains KÍ Klaksvík of the Faroese 1. deild kvinnur. From 2004 until 2015, she represented the Faroe Islands women's national football team at senior international level.

== Club career ==
Josephsen broke into the team at KÍ Klaksvík in 1994 and remained loyal to the club for two decades, during which she captained the team to a period of sustained dominance at domestic level. Speaking in 2005, following KÍ's sixth successive league title, she admitted to concerns about the level of competition: "We know when we go on the pitch that we will win the match, the only question is how much we will win. We are not getting any better by playing in this league."

As of 2013–14, Josephsen has made 39 appearances and scored seven goals for KÍ in the UEFA Women's Champions League, formerly known as the UEFA Women's Cup.

== International career ==
The Faroe Islands Football Association (FSF) scrapped their women's team in 1996, following a fruitless 1997 UEFA Women's Championship qualification campaign which culminated in a 9–0 defeat to Belgium. The association was unwilling to fund travel to away fixtures.

When the senior women's national team was relaunched in 2004 after an eight-year hiatus, Malena Josephsen started their first match, a 2–1 friendly defeat to Ireland. The game was staged in Klaksvík on 12 October 2004, the day before the nations' senior men's teams met at Lansdowne Road, Dublin.

She featured as the Faroe Islands won the football tournament at the 2005 Island Games in Shetland.

Josephsen's first matches in UEFA competition came in November 2006, at the UEFA Women's Euro 2009 qualifying series. At a preliminary round mini-tournament held in Strumica, Macedonia, Josephsen's injury time goal in the Faroe Islands' first match was not enough, as they lost 2–1 to Wales. The team was eliminated after another defeat, 1–0 to Kazakhstan. In the final match the Faroe Islands beat hosts Macedonia 7–0. Josephsen netted twice in a result which remains the Faroe Islands' record win.

In 2012, Josephsen and her KÍ teammates Randi Wardum and Rannvá B. Andreasen simultaneously became the first Faroese players to win 25 caps.

In June 2016 she announced that she would no longer play for the national team. She has played 41 matches and scored ten goals for the national team of the Faroe Islands.

== International goals ==
Scores and results list Faroe Islands' goal tally first.

#	Date	Venue	Opponent	Score	Result	Competition	Source
1	18 November 2006	Stadion Mladost, Strumica, Macedonia	Wales	1–2	1–2	UEFA Women's Euro 2009 Qual. - Preliminary round	
2	23 October 2006	Stadion Kukuš, Strumica, Macedonia	Macedonia	1–0	7–0	UEFA Women's Euro 2009 Qual. - Preliminary round	
3	23 October 2006	Stadion Kukuš, Strumica, Macedonia	Macedonia	6–0	7–0	UEFA Women's Euro 2009 Qual. - Preliminary round	
4	7 November 2007	Panevėžys, Lithuania	Latvia	2–0	3–0	UEFA friendly competition	
5	15 May 2008	Luxembourg, Luxembourg	Luxembourg	3–0	4–2	UEFA friendly competition	
6	27 October 2008	ARVI Football Arena, Marijampolė, Lithuania	Luxembourg	6–2	6–2	UEFA friendly competition	
7	11 April 2009	Sportski park Podravac, Virje, Croatia	Croatia	3–1	3–1	UEFA friendly competition	
8	16 April 2009	Gradski stadion, Križevci, Croatia	Lithuania	3–1	3–1	UEFA friendly competition	
9	5 March 2011	Ta' Qali National Stadium, Ta' Qali, Malta	Malta	1–0	2–0	UEFA Women's Euro 2013 qualifying - Preliminary Round	
10	28 November 2012	Stade Jos Haupert, Niederkorn, Luxembourg	Luxembourg	6–0	6–0	Friendly	
