= 1. deild kvinnur =

Top level women's football league of the Faroe Islands

- Founded: 1985
- Country: Faroe Islands
- Confederation: UEFA
- Number of clubs: 6
- Level on pyramid: 1
- Domestic cup: Faroese Women's Cup
- International cup: Women's Champions League
- Current champions: NSÍ Runavík (1st title) (2024)
- Most championships: KÍ Klaksvík (23 titles)
- Current: 2026 1. deild kvinnur

The Faroe Islands Premier League kvinnur (also known as Betri Deildin kvinnur for sponsorship reasons) is the top level women's football league of the Faroe Islands. It was called 1. deild kvinnur until 2018, when the Faroese top tier in the women's football for the first time was named after a sponsor. The new name was Betri Deildin kvinnur and is a deal for five years, from 2018 until the end of the 2022 season.

It is organized by the Faroe Islands Football Association and it was first played in 1985. The winners qualify for the UEFA Women's Champions League.

== History ==
The league was played for the first time in 1985. In its early years and throughout the 1990s, it was dominated by the Tórshavn teams, with HB winning it seven times and B36 four; other teams to be crowned champions in the period were Skála, two times, and ÍF, once. KÍ also won their first title during the successful period of the Tórshavn duo.

=== The KÍ era ===
KÍ dominated the league from 2000, winning it seventeen times in a row, establishing a new world record for consecutive championships won.

The dominance was so big that in an interview in 2005, after winning the league for the sixth consecutive season, KÍ midfielder Malena Josephsen stated: "We know when we go on the pitch that we will win the match, the only question is [by] how much we will win. We are not getting any better by playing in this league."

=== A new champion and sponsorship deal ===
After being runners-up four consecutive times, EB/Streymur/Skála ended KÍ's winning streak in 2017, becoming only the second club to represent the Faroe Islands in the UEFA Women's Champions League, and defended their title in 2018.

For the 2018 season, the league gained its first sponsorship deal, when the FSF announced that Betri, a bank and insurance company headquartered in Tórshavn, would sponsor the men's and women's leagues, thus changing 1. deild kvinnur's name to Betri deildin kvinnur. The second best division was then given the name 1. deild kvinnur.

== Format ==
In 2020 the league will be contested by six teams, playing each other four times for a total of 20 rounds. A second division exists, but there is no promotion and relegation between the two divisions.

== Current teams ==
Locations of the 2020 1. deild kvinnur teams

In 2020 the league will be contested by six teams, the same as in 2018, one team more from last season's five, as the women's team from the club NSÍ from Runavík entered the league.

Team	City	Stadium
B36 Tórshavn	Tórshavn	Gundadalur
EB/Streymur/Skála	Streymnes	Við Margáir
Havnar Bóltfelag	Tórshavn	Gundadalur
ÍF/Víkingur/B68	Norðragøta	Sarpugerði
Klaksvíkar Ítróttarfelag	Klaksvík	Við Djúpumýrar
NSÍ	Runavík	Við Løkin

== List of seasons ==
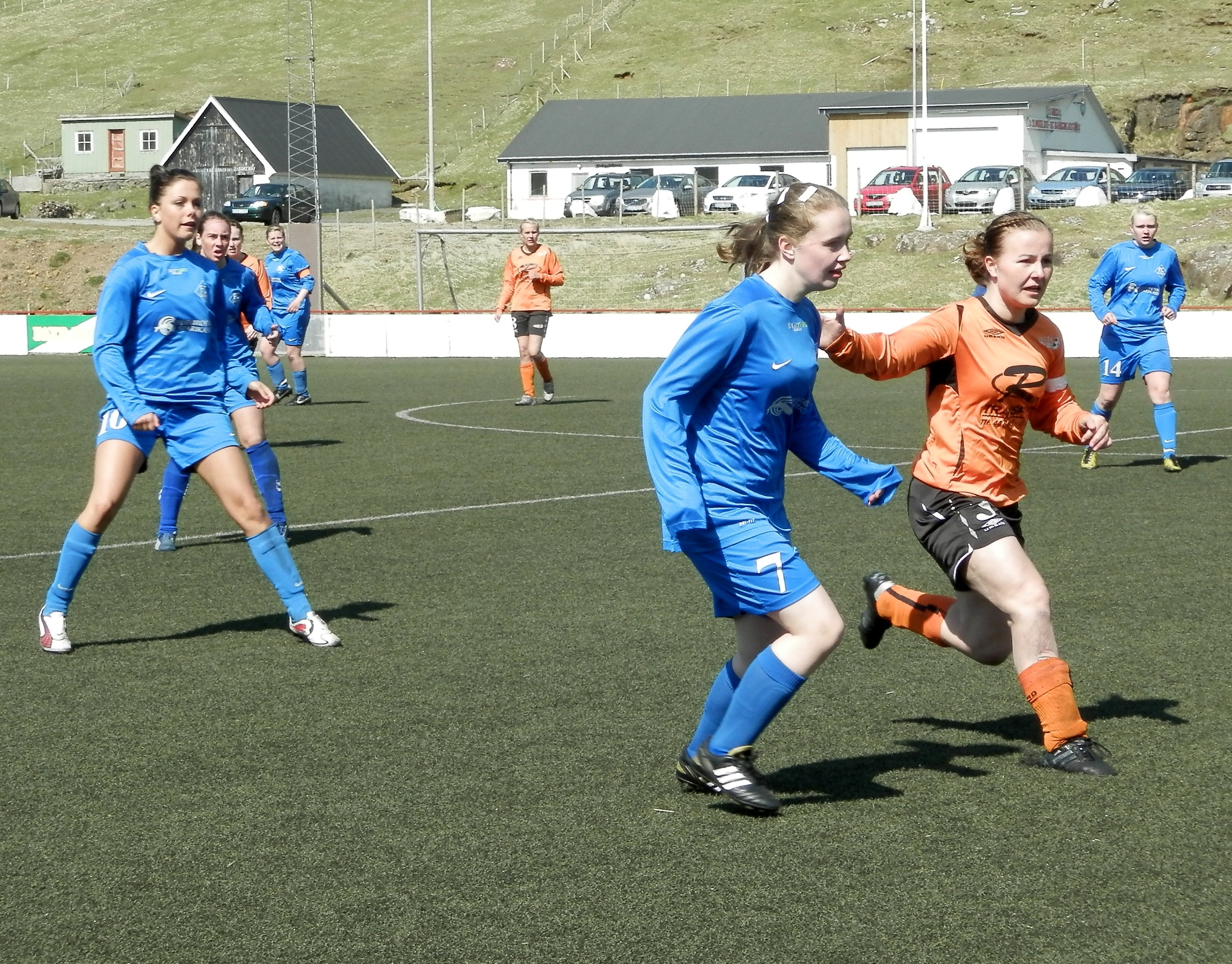
FC Suðuroy vs. Skála in May 2012.

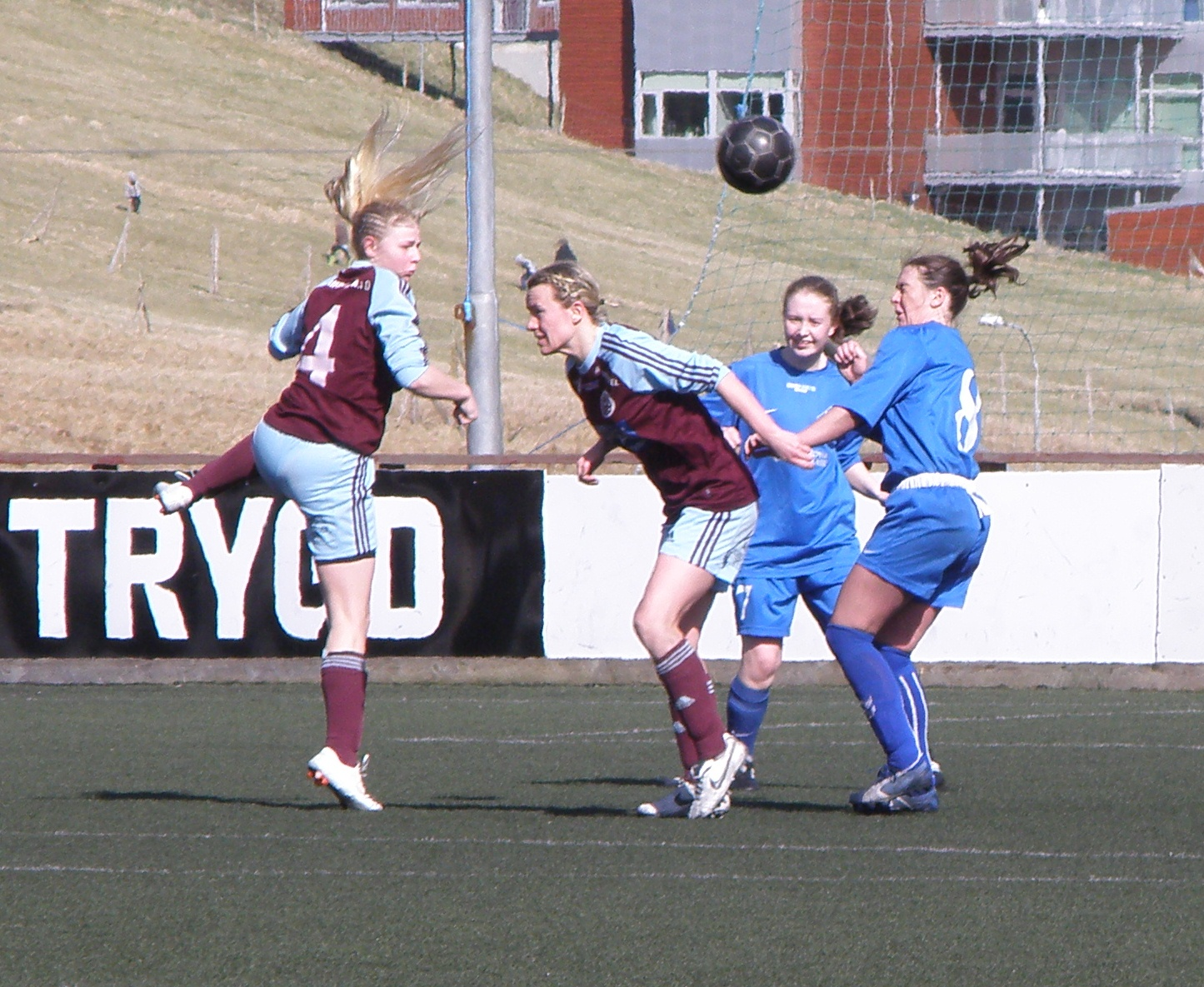
FC Suðuroy vs. AB in April 2012.

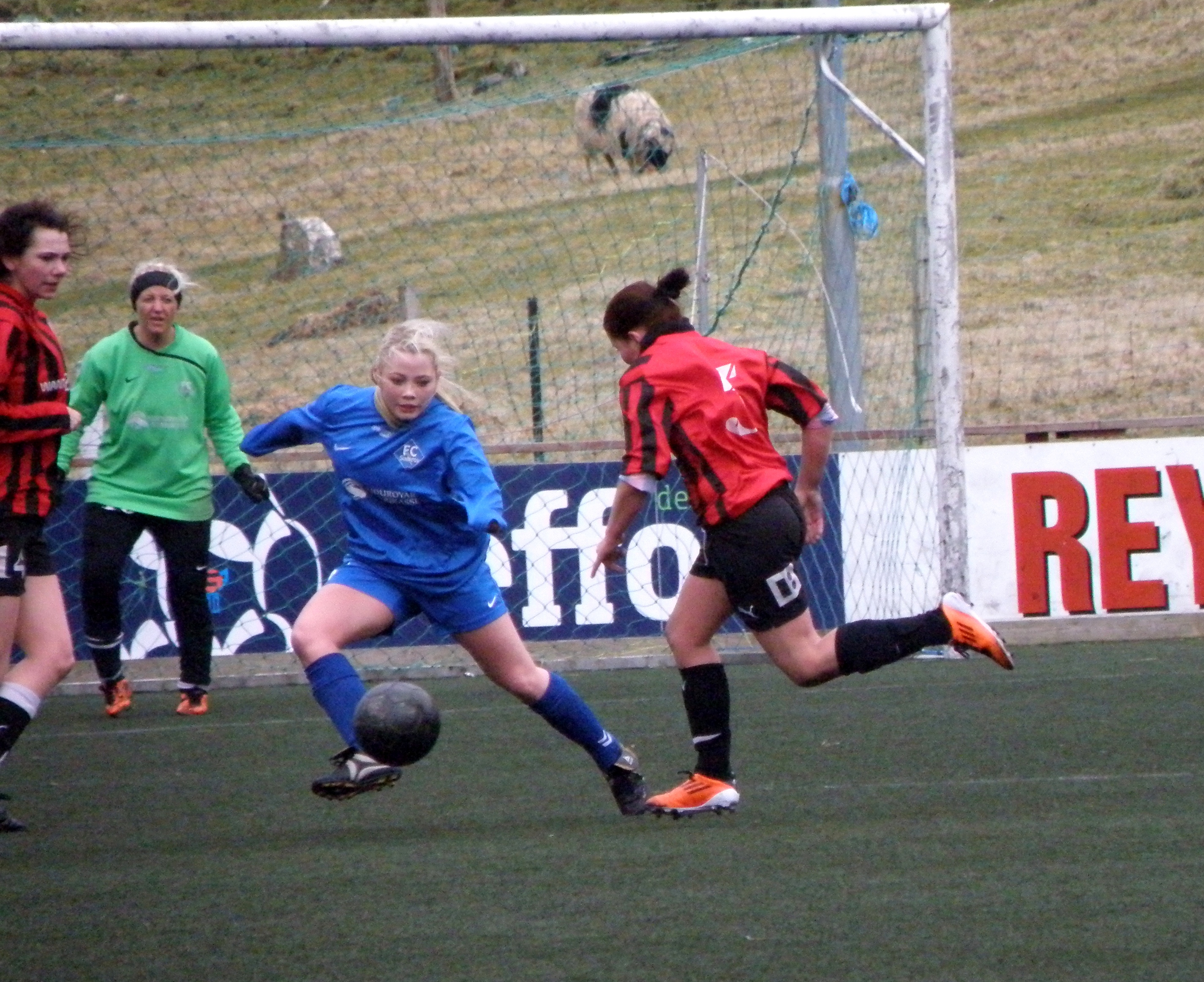
FC Suðuroy vs. HB in April 2012.

Season	Champions	Runners-up	Top Scorer (club)	Goals
1985	B36	HB	not available	
1986	HB	GÍ	not available	
1987	B36 (2)	HB	not available	
1988	HB (2)	B36	not available	
1989	HB (3)	ÍF	Hildur Rasmussen (B36)	16
1990	Skála	HB	Malan Klakkstein (KÍ)	19
1991	ÍF	KÍ	Kristina Eyðbjørnsdóttir (ÍF)	18
1992	Skála (2)	KÍ	Malan Klakkstein (KÍ)	18
1993	HB (4)	VB	Helga Ellingsgaard (HB)	11
1994	HB (5)	B36	Helga Ellingsgaard (HB)	15
1995	HB (6)	B36	Sigrun Mikkelsen (HB)	30
1996	B36 (3)	KÍ	Signhild Petersen (Skála); Sigrun Mikkelsen (HB); Sonja Steinhólm (LÍF)	11
1997	KÍ	HB	Rannvá Andreasen (KÍ)	28
1998	B36 (4)	HB	Rannvá Andreasen (KÍ)	20
1999	HB (7)	KÍ	Eyðfríð Kristiansen (HB); Rakul Joensen (B36)	12
2000	KÍ (2)	VB	Halltóra Joensen (VB)	26
2001	KÍ (3)	B36	Kristina Eyðbjørnsdóttir (HB)	17
2002	KÍ (4)	B36	Rannvá Andreasen (KÍ)	36
2003	KÍ (5)	B68	Rannvá Andreasen (KÍ)	46
2004	KÍ (6)	B36	Rannvá Andreasen (KÍ)	30
2005	KÍ (7)	B36	Malena Josephsen (KÍ)	27
2006	KÍ (8)	GÍ	Rannvá Andreasen (KÍ); Hanna Højgaard (GÍ)	28
2007	KÍ (9)	B36	Malena Josephsen (KÍ)	17
2008	KÍ (10)	AB	Rannvá Andreasen (KÍ)	27
2009	KÍ (11)	AB	Rannvá Andreasen (KÍ)	28
2010	KÍ (12)	AB	Rannvá Andreasen (KÍ)	27
2011	KÍ (13)	AB	Rannvá Andreasen (KÍ)	29
2012	KÍ (14)	B36	Rannvá Andreasen (KÍ)	31
2013	KÍ (15)	EB/Streymur/Skála	Heidi Sevdal (HB)	29
2014	KÍ (16)	EB/Streymur/Skála	Rannvá Andreasen (KÍ); Heidi Sevdal (HB)	29
2015	KÍ (17)	EB/Streymur/Skála	Heidi Sevdal (HB); Maria Thomsen (KÍ)	22
2016	KÍ (18)	EB/Streymur/Skála	Milja Simonsen (HB)	25
2017	EB/Streymur/Skála	KÍ	Heidi Sevdal (EBS/Skála)	33
2018	EB/Streymur/Skála (2)	HB	Heidi Sevdal (HB)	23
2019	KÍ (19)	HB	Heidi Sevdal (HB)	25
2020	KÍ (20)	NSÍ	Evy á Lakjuni (KÍ)	17
2021	KÍ (21)	NSÍ	Heidi Sevdal (NSÍ)	33
2022	KÍ (22)	NSÍ		
2023	KÍ (23)	NSÍ		
2024	NSÍ Runavík	KÍ		
2025	KÍ (24)	NSÍ Runavík		

== Titles by club ==
Club	Location	Titles	Runners-up
**KÍ**	Klaksvík	24	6
**HB**	Tórshavn	7	7
**B36**	Tórshavn	4	9
**EB/Streymur/Skála**	Skála / Streymnes	2	4
Skála	Skála	2	0
**NSÍ**	Runavík	1	5
ÍF	Fuglafjørður	1	1
AB	Argir	0	4
GÍ	Norðragøta	0	2
VB	Vágur	0	2
B68	Toftir	0	1

Clubs in bold are currently playing in the league.
Clubs in italics are competing in cooperation with another club or inactive in women's football.
