= Rannvá Andreasen =

Faroese footballer

Rannvá B. Andreasen
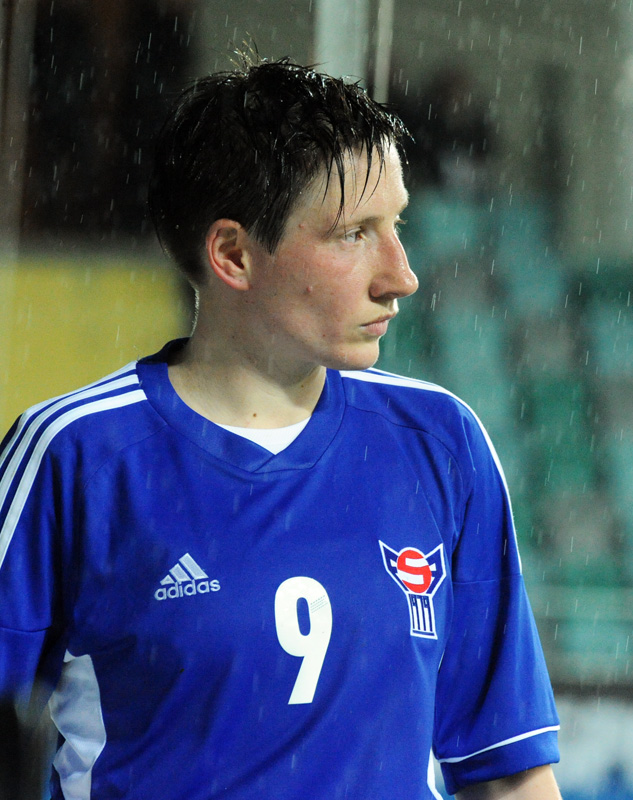
- Playing for the Faroe Islands in October 2013

Personal information
- Full name: Rannvá Biskopstø Andreasen
- Date of birth: 10 November 1980 (age 45)
- Place of birth: Klaksvík, Faroe Islands
- Position: Forward

Team information
- Current team: KÍ
- Number: 9

Senior career*
| Years | Team | Apps | (Gls) |
| 1995– | KÍ | 447 | (561) |

International career^{‡}
| 1997–1998 | Faroe Islands U19 | 6 | (1) |
| 2004–2020 | Faroe Islands | 56 | (27) |
- * Club domestic league appearances and goals as of 20 September 2023 ‡ National team caps and goals as of 23 October 2020

Rannvá Biskopstø Andreasen (born 10 November 1980) is a Faroese football forward for KÍ Klaksvík of the Faroese 1. deild kvinnur. From 2004 to 2020, she represented the Faroe Islands women's national football team at senior international level. She is the national team's second highest goalscorer, inclusive of both male and female players.

== Club career ==
In 1995, aged 14, Andreasen made her 1. deild kvinnur debut for KÍ Klaksvík in an 11–0 thrashing by rivals HB Tórshavn. Despite the inauspicious start Andreasen emerged as a promising player and finished her first season with 15 goals. In 1997 she was the league's top goalscorer for the first time with 28 goals as KÍ won the championship. In 2000, KÍ won a league and cup double, beating HB Tórshavn 2–0 in the cup final.

As of 2013, KÍ have won the league title every season since 2000, with Andreasen as top goalscorer on 11 occasions, including in 2003 when she scored a record 46 goals. She also collected ten Faroese Women's Cup winner's medals.

Andreasen has made 50 appearances and scored 16 goals for KÍ in the UEFA Women's Champions League, formerly known as the UEFA Women's Cup. Her debut came in October 2001, in the first round of the inaugural 2001–02 competition held in Helsinki. Andreasen scored both goals in KÍ's opening 2–1 win over Austrians USC Landhaus Wien, but the team then lost 4–0 to hosts HJK and Italian champions Torres and were eliminated.

== Career statistics ==
=== Club ===
| Klub | Sezon | Liga | Liga | | Puchar kraju | | Europa | | Suma | |
| Klub | Sezon | Liga | Mecze | Bramki | Mecze | Bramki | Mecze | Bramki | Mecze | Bramki |
|---|---|---|---|---|---|---|---|---|---|---|
| KÍ Klaksvík | 1995 | 1. deild kvinnur | 18 | 15 | 0 | 0 | — | | 18 | 15 |
| KÍ Klaksvík | 1996 | 1. deild kvinnur | 12 | 6 | 8 | 6 | — | | 20 | 12 |
| KÍ Klaksvík | 1997 | 1. deild kvinnur | 14 | 28 | 9 | 23 | — | | 23 | 51 |
| KÍ Klaksvík | 1998 | 1. deild kvinnur | 9 | 20 | 6 | 16 | — | | 15 | 36 |
| KÍ Klaksvík | 1999 | 1. deild kvinnur | 6 | 8 | 1 | 1 | — | | 7 | 9 |
| KÍ Klaksvík | 2000 | 1. deild kvinnur | 14 | 24 | 4 | 8 | — | | 18 | 32 |
| KÍ Klaksvík | 2001 | 1. deild kvinnur | 10 | 7 | 4 | 4 | 3 | 2 | 17 | 13 |
| KÍ Klaksvík | 2002 | 1. deild kvinnur | 17 | 36 | 4 | 8 | 3 | 0 | 24 | 44 |
| KÍ Klaksvík | 2003 | 1. deild kvinnur | 16 | 46 | 4 | 8 | 3 | 1 | 23 | 55 |
| KÍ Klaksvík | 2004 | 1. deild kvinnur | 10 | 30 | 4 | 5 | 3 | 3 | 17 | 38 |
| KÍ Klaksvík | 2005 | 1. deild kvinnur | 19 | 21 | 2 | 1 | 2 | 0 | 23 | 22 |
| KÍ Klaksvík | 2006 | 1. deild kvinnur | 18 | 28 | 4 | 3 | 3 | 0 | 25 | 31 |
| KÍ Klaksvík | 2007 | 1. deild kvinnur | 16 | 14 | 4 | 6 | 3 | 0 | 23 | 20 |
| KÍ Klaksvík | 2008 | 1. deild kvinnur | 20 | 27 | 3 | 1 | 3 | 1 | 26 | 29 |
| KÍ Klaksvík | 2009 | 1. deild kvinnur | 20 | 28 | 3 | 1 | 3 | 3 | 26 | 32 |
| KÍ Klaksvík | 2010 | 1. deild kvinnur | 18 | 27 | 4 | 4 | 3 | 1 | 25 | 32 |
| KÍ Klaksvík | 2011 | 1. deild kvinnur | 21 | 29 | 2 | 3 | 3 | 0 | 26 | 32 |
| KÍ Klaksvík | 2012 | 1. deild kvinnur | 18 | 31 | 4 | 4 | 3 | 2 | 25 | 37 |
| KÍ Klaksvík | 2013 | 1. deild kvinnur | 18 | 23 | 3 | 6 | 3 | 1 | 24 | 30 |
| KÍ Klaksvík | 2014 | 1. deild kvinnur | 19 | 29 | 4 | 4 | 3 | 0 | 26 | 33 |
| KÍ Klaksvík | 2015 | 1. deild kvinnur | 3 | 4 | 0 | 0 | 0 | 0 | 3 | 4 |
| KÍ Klaksvík | Ogólnie | | 314 | 481 | 79 | 112 | 41 | 14 | 434 | 607 |

== International career ==
The Faroe Islands Football Association (FSF) relaunched their senior women's national team in 2004 after an eight-year hiatus. Andreasen played the whole of their first match, a 2–1 friendly defeat to Ireland. The match was staged in Klaksvík on 12 October 2004, the day before the nations' senior men's teams met at Lansdowne Road, Dublin.

In the next match, a return friendly with Ireland at the Oscar Traynor Centre in Dublin, Andreasen put the Faroe Islands ahead after six minutes. Ireland hit back to win 2–1.

Andreasen was part of the squad as the Faroe Islands won the football tournament at the 2005 Island Games in Shetland. She struck two goals in a 3–0 win over Bermuda and contributed four to the 12–0 defeat of Guernsey in the gold medal match.

Andreasen's first matches in UEFA competition came in the UEFA Women's Euro 2009 qualifying series. At a preliminary round mini-tournament held in Strumica, Macedonia, the Faroe Islands lost 2–1 to Wales and 1–0 to Kazakhstan, but then beat hosts Macedonia 7–0. Andreasen plundered four goals in a result which remained the Faroe Islands' record win, until their 8–0 thrashing of Andorra on 6 April 2015 with Rannvá again netting four goals.

In 2012, Andreasen and her KÍ teammates Randi Wardum and Malena Josephsen simultaneously became the first female Faroese players to win 25 caps. She holds the record for most matches and scored goals for the Faroe Islands; as of 25 October 2017 she has played 51 matches and scored 26 goals.

In March 2020 Andreasen announced that the friendly match against Estonia on 9 March 2020 was her last international for the Faroe Islands. She came in as a substitute after 81 minutes. She scored the 1-1 goal seven minutes later, which was also the final result of the match.

== Personal life ==
For much of her career at club and international level, Andreasen has played alongside her twin Ragna Patawary. She is also the aunt of Faroese international footballer Jákup Andreasen.

== International goals ==
Scores and results list Faroe Islands' goal tally first.

| # | Date | Venue | Opponent | Score | Result | Competition | Source |
|---|---|---|---|---|---|---|---|
| 1 | 6 June 2005 | Dublin, Ireland | Republic of Ireland | 1–0 | 1–2 | Friendly | |
| 2 | 12 July 2005 | Cunningsburgh, Shetland | Bermuda | 1–0 | 3–0 | 2005 Island Games | |
| 3 | 12 July 2005 | Cunningsburgh, Shetland | Bermuda | 3–0 | 3–0 | 2005 Island Games | |
| 4 | 23 October 2006 | Stadion Kukuš, Strumica, Macedonia | Macedonia | 2–0 | 7–0 | UEFA Women's Euro 2009 Qual. | |
| 5 | 23 October 2006 | Stadion Kukuš, Strumica, Macedonia | Macedonia | 3–0 | 7–0 | UEFA Women's Euro 2009 Qual. | |
| 6 | 23 October 2006 | Stadion Kukuš, Strumica, Macedonia | Macedonia | 4–0 | 7–0 | UEFA Women's Euro 2009 Qual. | |
| 7 | 23 October 2006 | Stadion Kukuš, Strumica, Macedonia | Macedonia | 7–0 | 7–0 | UEFA Women's Euro 2009 Qual. | |
| 8 | 7 November 2007 | Panevėžys, Lithuania | Latvia | 1–0 | 3–0 | UEFA friendly competition | |
| 9 | 25 October 2008 | Marijampolė, Lithuania | Lithuania | 1–0 | 4–1 | UEFA friendly competition | |
| 10 | 12 May 2008 | Luxembourg, Luxembourg | Latvia | 1–1 | 4–2 | UEFA friendly competition | |
| 11 | 12 May 2008 | Luxembourg, Luxembourg | Latvia | 2–1 | 4–2 | UEFA friendly competition | |
| 12 | 15 May 2008 | Luxembourg, Luxembourg | Luxembourg | 1–0 | 4–2 | UEFA friendly competition | |
| 13 | 15 May 2008 | Luxembourg, Luxembourg | Luxembourg | 2–0 | 4–2 | UEFA friendly competition | |
| 14 | 11 April 2009 | Sportski park Podravac, Virje, Croatia | Croatia | 2–1 | 3–1 | UEFA friendly competition | |
| 15 | 13 April 2009 | NK Pitomača, Pitomača, Croatia | Bosnia and Herzegovina | 1–2 | 2–3 | UEFA friendly competition | |
| 16 | 28 November 2012 | Stade Jos Haupert, Niederkorn, Luxembourg | Luxembourg | 1–0 | 6–0 | UEFA friendly competition | |
| 17 | 28 November 2012 | Stade Jos Haupert, Niederkorn, Luxembourg | Luxembourg | 3–0 | 6–0 | UEFA friendly competition | |
| 18 | 6 April 2013 | LFF Stadium, Vilnius, Lithuania | Lithuania | 1–0 | 1–0 | 2015 FIFA Women's World Cup Qual. – UEFA Preliminary Round | |
| 19 | 6 April 2015 | Victor Tedesco Stadium, Ħamrun, Malta | Andorra | 1–0 | 8–0 | UEFA Women's Euro 2017 qualifying preliminary round | |
| 20 | 6 April 2015 | Victor Tedesco Stadium, Ħamrun, Malta | Andorra | 2–0 | 8–0 | UEFA Women's Euro 2017 qualifying preliminary round | |
| 21 | 6 April 2015 | Victor Tedesco Stadium, Ħamrun, Malta | Andorra | 6–0 | 8–0 | UEFA Women's Euro 2017 qualifying preliminary round | |
| 22 | 6 April 2015 | Victor Tedesco Stadium, Ħamrun, Malta | Andorra | 7–0 | 8–0 | UEFA Women's Euro 2017 qualifying preliminary round | |
| 23 | 9 April 2015 | Victor Tedesco Stadium, Ħamrun, Malta | Malta | 1–0 | 4–2 | UEFA Women's Euro 2017 qualifying preliminary round | |
| 24 | 4 August 2016 | Latvia | Estonia | 2–2 | 2–2 | Baltic Cup | |
| 25 | 5 August 2016 | Riga, Latvia | Lithuania | 1–0 | 1–0 | Baltic Cup | |
| 26 | 11 April 2017 | Tórsvøllur, Tórshavn, Faroe Islands | Turkey | 1–1 | 2–1 | 2019 FIFA Women's World Cup qualification – UEFA preliminary round | |
| 27 | 9 March 2020 | Tórsvøllur, Tórshavn, Faroe Islands | Estonia | 1–1 | 1–1 | Friendly | |
