= Við Margáir =

Sports venue in Streymnes, Faroe Islands

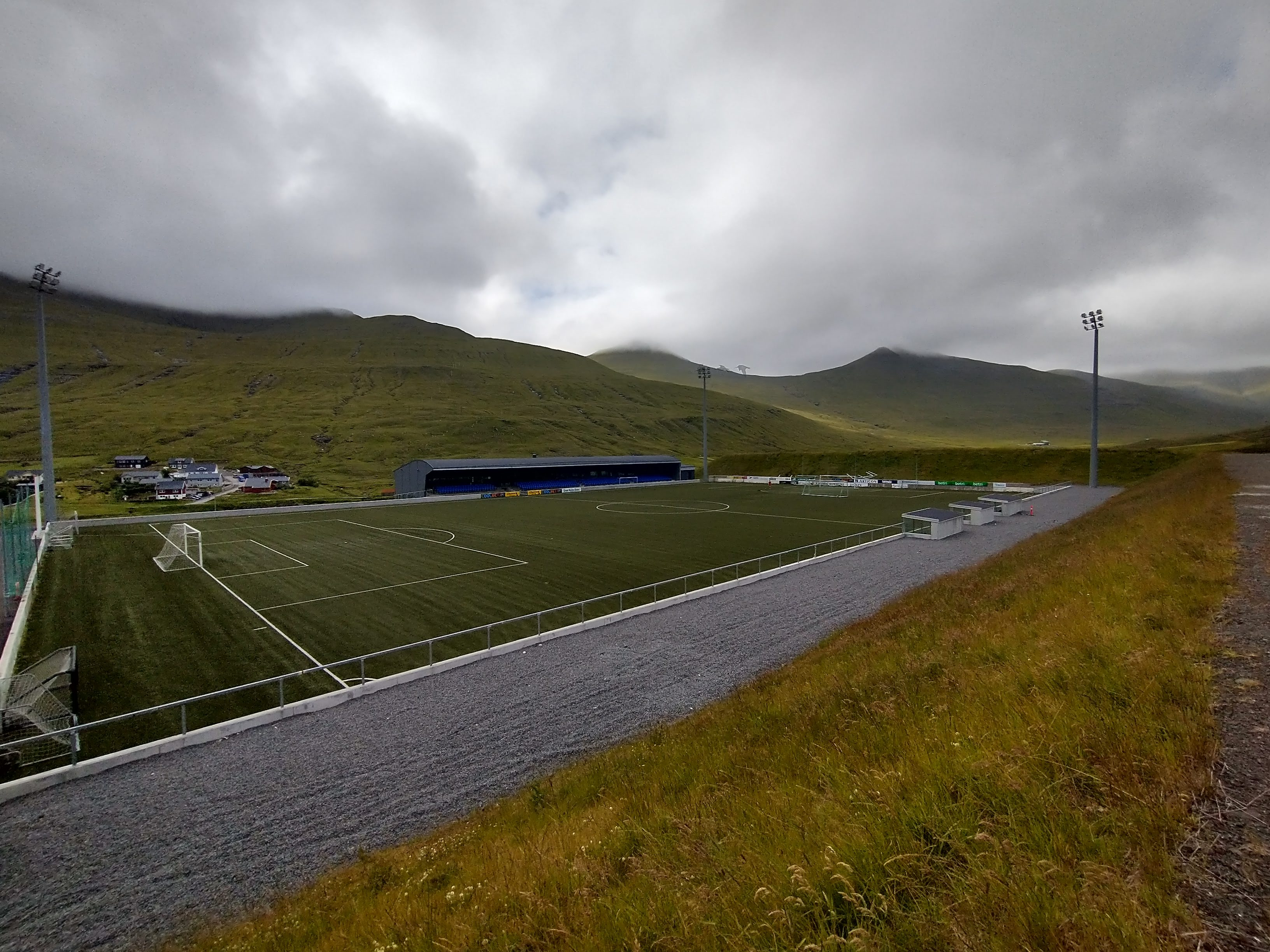
- Interactive map of Við Margáir
- Location: Frammi í Dal, Streymnes, Streymoy, Faroe Islands
- Coordinates: 62.1941°N 7.0431°W
- Capacity: 1,000
- Surface: Artificial turf

Tenant
- EB/Streymur

Við Margáir is a stadium in Streymnes, Faroe Islands. It is currently used mostly for association football matches and is the home ground of EB/Streymur.
