= EB/Streymur/Skála =

Faroese women's football team

- Full name: EB/Streymur/Skála
- Nickname: EBS/Skála
- Founded: 2013
- Ground: undir Mýruhjalla, Skála við Margáir, Streymnes
- Manager: Mathias Davidsen
- League: 1. deild kvinnur
- 2023: 7th
| Home colours | Away colours |

EB/Streymur/Skála is a Faroese women's football team based in Skála and Streymnes. The team is the result of a cooperation between the women's football departments of EB/Streymur and Skála ÍF. They won the 1. deild kvinnur for the first time in 2017, ending KÍ's run of 17 consecutive titles.

== History ==
Before the 2013 season, Skála and EB/Streymur, which finished 5th and 6th, respectively, in the previous season (contested by 10 clubs), unified their women's teams, aiming to compete for the title against the dominant KÍ. Skála was a considerable force in Faroese women's football in the early 1990s, having won the 1. deild kvinnur twice and the Faroese Women's Cup once. EB/Streymur was less successful, having reached only a Cup final in 2004, in which they ended up thrashed by KÍ.

The team had a strong first season, handing KÍ their first loss in nearly four years, and finishing as runners-up only four points behind them. EBS/Skála finished as runners-up for the next three seasons, finally ending the Klaksvík club's streak of 17 consecutive titles in 2017. In the same year they won the Cup for the first time and defended both titles in 2018.

== Current squad ==
As of 4 May 2020.

Note: Flags indicate national team as defined under FIFA eligibility rules; some limited exceptions apply. Players may hold more than one non-FIFA nationality.

| No. | Pos. | Nation | Player |
|---|---|---|---|
| 1 | GK | FRO | Anna Sunadóttir Hansen |
| 2 | DF | FRO | Randi Fagradal |
| 3 | DF | FRO | Mirjam Danielson |
| 5 | MF | FRO | Birna Tummasardóttir Mikkelsen |
| 6 | MF | FRO | Kára Djurhuus |
| 7 | FW | FRO | Silja Augustinussen |
| 8 | MF | FRO | Bjarta Djurhuus |
| 9 | MF | FRO | Rúna Olsen |
| 10 | MF | FRO | Durita Mikkelsen |
| 11 | MF | FRO | Anna Sofía Sevdal (captain) |
| 12 | MF | FRO | Katrina Hansen |

| No. | Pos. | Nation | Player |
|---|---|---|---|
| 13 | FW | FRO | Miriam Egilsdóttir |
| 15 | DF | FRO | Sára Magnussen |
| 16 | DF | FRO | Lea Lisberg |
| 25 | GK | FRO | Sunnuvá Vesturdal |
| — | DF | FRO | Rúna Joensen |
| — | DF | FRO | Rakul Magnussen |
| — | DF | FRO | Sólfríő Persdóttir Rasmussen |
| — | MF | FRO | Sunnvá Johansen |
| — | MF | FRO | Íðunn Magnussen |

== Honours ==
- 1. deild kvinnur
  - Winners: 2017, 2018
  - Runners-up: 2013, 2014, 2015, 2016
- Faroese Women's Cup
  - Winners: 2017, 2018
  - Runners-up: 2015

== European record ==
| Season | Round | Opponent | Result |
|---|---|---|---|
| 2018–19 | Qualifying round | (Bulgaria) NSA Sofia | 0–3 |
| 2018–19 | Qualifying round | (Lithuania) Gintra Universitetas (H) | 0–7 |
| 2018–19 | Qualifying round | (Finland) Honka | 0–7 |
| 2019–20 | Qualifying round | (Kazakhstan) BIIK Kazygurt | 0–9 |
| 2019–20 | Qualifying round | (Finland) PK-35 Vantaa | 0–5 |
| 2019–20 | Qualifying round | (Estonia) Flora (H) | 0–2 |

- (H) = host
