= Við Djúpumýrar =

Football stadium in the Faroe Islands

Coordinates: 62.225246°N 6.579201°W

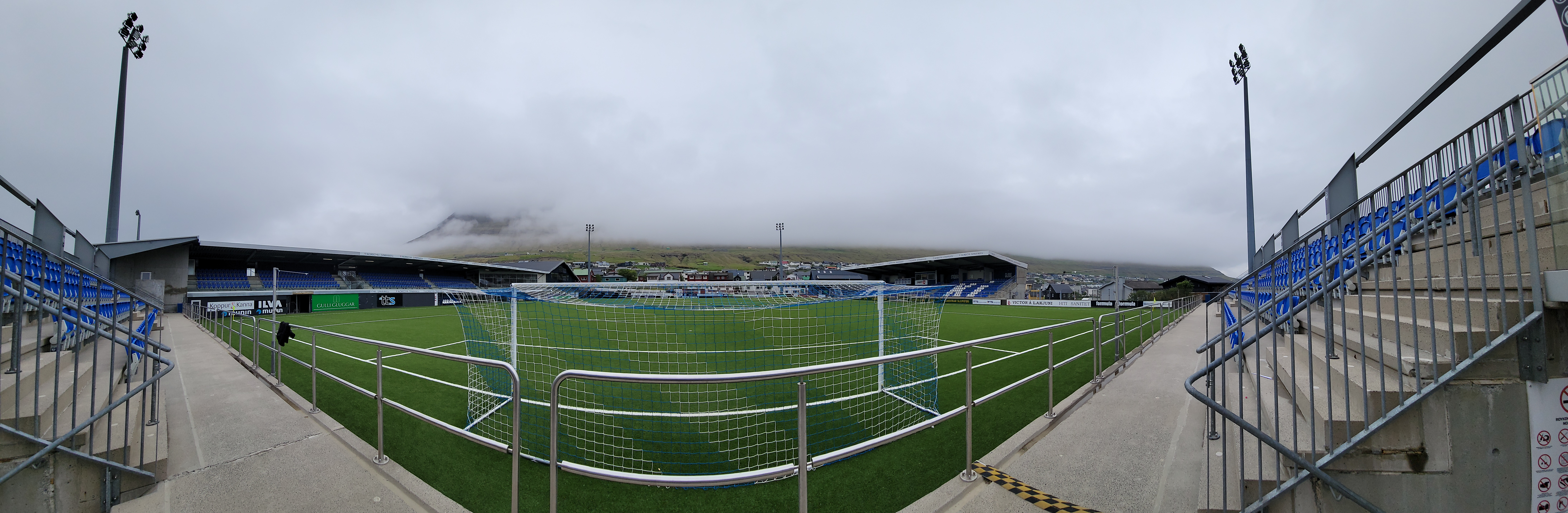
- Interactive map of Við Djúpumýrar
- Full name: Við Djúpumýrar
- Location: Klaksvík, Faroe Islands
- Capacity: 2,500 (1300 seated)

Tenants
- KÍ menn KÍ kvinnur

Við Djúpumýrar (formerly also known as Injector Arena for sponsorship reasons) is a multi-use stadium in Klaksvík, Faroe Islands. It is mostly used for football matches. Við Djúpumýrar is the home ground of Klaksvíkar Ítróttarfelag men's and women's teams and has an approximate capacity of 2,500 people, with 524 seats. The stadium hosted the Faroe Islands Cup final in 2010 and 2011.

== Upgrades in 2019 ==
The stadium went through a renovation before the 2019 season. The main goal is to get it ready to host international and European matches.
