= Faroe Islands women's national under-17 football team =

National association football team

Faroe Islands Women's U-17
- Association: FSF
- Confederation: UEFA (Europe)
- Head coach: Pauli Poulsen
- FIFA code: FRO

First international
- Italy 7–0 Faroe Islands; 16 September 2009

Biggest win
- Faroe Islands 7–0 Georgia; 21 September 2009

Biggest defeat
- Faroe Islands 0–12 Norway; 17 October 2019

UEFA Women's Under-17 Championship
- Appearances: 1 (first in 2025)
- Best result: Group stage (2025)

Faroe Islands women's national under-17 football team represents Faroe Islands in international youth football competitions.

== FIFA U-17 Women's World Cup ==
The team has never qualified for the FIFA U-17 Women's World Cup

Year	Result	Matches	Wins	Draws*	Losses	GF	GA
(New Zealand) 2008	Did not qualify						
(Trinidad and Tobago) 2010	Did not qualify						
(Azerbaijan) 2012	Did not qualify						
(Costa Rica) 2014	Did not qualify						
(Jordan) 2016	Did not qualify						
(Uruguay) 2018	Did not qualify						
(India) 2022	Did not qualify						
(Dominican Republic) 2024	Did not qualify						
(Morocco) 2025	Did not qualify						
Total	0/9	0	0	0	0	0	0

== UEFA Women's Under-17 Championship ==
The team qualified for the first time in 2021 when the Faroe Islands were awarded the hosting rights to the 2025 championship on 19 April. However, the team may qualify earlier than 2025.

Year	Result	MP	W	D	L	GF	GA
(Switzerland) 2008	Did not qualify						
(Switzerland) 2009	Did not qualify						
(Switzerland) 2010	Did not qualify						
(Switzerland) 2011	Did not qualify						
(Switzerland) 2012	Did not qualify						
(Switzerland) 2013	Did not qualify						
(England) 2014	Did not qualify						
(Iceland) 2015	Did not qualify						
(Belarus) 2016	Did not qualify						
(Czech Republic) 2017	Did not qualify						
(Lithuania) 2018	Did not qualify						
(Bulgaria) 2019	Did not qualify						
(Sweden) ~~2020~~	Cancelled						
(Faroe Islands) ~~2021~~	Qualified as host but tournament cancelled						
(Bosnia and Herzegovina) 2022	Did not qualify						
(Estonia) 2023	Did not qualify						
(Sweden) 2024	Did not qualify						
(Faroe Islands) 2025	Group stage	3	0	0	3	0	28
(Northern Ireland) 2026	Did not qualify						
(Finland) 2027	to be determined						
(Belgium) 2028	to be determined						
(Turkey) 2029	to be determined						
Total	1/16	3	0	0	3	0	28

== See also ==
- Faroe Islands women's national football team
