= Faroese Women's Cup =

Steypakappingin í kvinnufótbólti
- Founded: 1990
- Region: Faroe Islands
- Teams: 9
- Current champions: NSÍ Runavík (2nd title)
- Most championships: KÍ Klaksvík (16 titles)
- Website: Official site (in Faroese)

The Faroese Women's Cup (Steypakappingin kvinnur) is the national women's football cup competition in the Faroe Islands. The first edition was contested in 1990.

== Finals ==
Season	Champion	Result	Runners-up	Venue
1990	HB	2–2	Skála	Gundadalur, Tórshavn
1990	HB	Replay: 3–1 (a.e.t.)	Skála	Gundadalur, Tórshavn
1991	B36	1–0	HB	Gundadalur, Tórshavn
1992	Skála	2–1	VB	Gundadalur, Tórshavn
1993	B36	2–1	ÍF	Gundadalur, Tórshavn
1994	B36	4–2 (a.e.t.)	ÍF	Gundadalur, Tórshavn
1995	B36	2–1	Sumba/VB	Gundadalur, Tórshavn
1996	HB	3–1	KÍ	Gundadalur, Tórshavn
1997	B36	5–1	KÍ	Gundadalur, Tórshavn
1998	HB	2–1	B36	Gundadalur, Tórshavn
1999	HB	4–3 (a.e.t.)	KÍ	Gundadalur, Tórshavn
2000	KÍ	2–0	HB	Gundadalur, Tórshavn
2001	HB	3–3 (a.e.t.), 5–4 (p)	KÍ	Gundadalur, Tórshavn
2002	KÍ	6–1	HB	Gundadalur, Tórshavn
2003	KÍ	2–1	HB	Tórsvøllur, Tórshavn
2004	KÍ	15–0	EB/Streymur	Tórsvøllur, Tórshavn
2005	B36	1–0	KÍ	Tórsvøllur, Tórshavn
2006	KÍ	2–0	AB	Tórsvøllur, Tórshavn
2007	KÍ	3–0	GÍ	Uppi á Brekku, Leirvík
2008	KÍ	1–0	B36	Gundadalur, Tórshavn
2009	AB	2–1	KÍ	Gundadalur, Tórshavn
2010	KÍ	1–0	Skála	Gundadalur, Tórshavn
2011	KÍ	1–0	AB	Við Djúpumýrar, Klaksvík
2012	KÍ	2–1	B36	Tórsvøllur, Tórshavn
2013	KÍ	5–1	ÍF	Tórsvøllur, Tórshavn
2014	KÍ	1–0	HB	Tórsvøllur, Tórshavn
2015	KÍ	2–1	EB/Streymur/Skála	Tórsvøllur, Tórshavn
2016	KÍ	3–2	HB	Tórsvøllur, Tórshavn
2017	EB/Streymur/Skála	3–2	HB	Tórsvøllur, Tórshavn
2018	EB/Streymur/Skála	2–1	HB	Tórsvøllur, Tórshavn
2019	HB	3–0	EB/Streymur/Skála	Tórsvøllur, Tórshavn
2020	KÍ	3–0	NSÍ	Tórsvøllur, Tórshavn
2021	NSÍ	4–2	HB	Tórsvøllur, Tórshavn
2022	KÍ	2–1	HB	Tórsvøllur, Tórshavn
2023	NSÍ	2–1 (a.e.t.)	KÍ	Tórsvøllur, Tórshavn

== Titles by club ==
Team	Titles	Runners-up	Last title
KÍ Klaksvík	16	7	2022
HB Tórshavn	6	10	2019
B36 Tórshavn	6	3	2005
EB/Streymur/Skála	2	2	2018
NSÍ	2	1	2023
Skála ÍF	1	2	1992
AB Argir	1	2	2009
ÍF Fuglafjørður	0	3	
VB Vágur	0	1	
Sumba/VB	0	1	
EB/Streymur	0	1	
GÍ Gøta	0	1	

The clubs in italics no longer exist or are currently inactive.

== See also ==
- Faroe Islands Cup, men's edition
