= Klaksvíkar Ítróttarfelag (women) =

KÍ Klaksvík
- Full name: Klaksvíkar Ítróttarfelag
- Nickname: KÍ
- Founded: 24 August 1904 (Women's team 1985)
- Ground: Djúpumýra Stadium; Klaksvík
- Capacity: 3,000
- Chairman: Tummas Lervig
- Manager: Kaveh Magnusson
- League: 1. deild kvinnur
- 2025: Champions
- Website: www.ki.fo/1-deild-kvinnur-mainmenu-210.html
| Home colours | Away colours |

KÍ Klaksvík Kvinnur is the women's football team of KÍ Klaksvík, a Faroese football club, based in Klaksvík and founded in 1904. The club plays in blue and white. Their stadium, Djúpumýra, has a capacity of 3,000.

The women's team was created in 1985. It is the reigning champion of the 1. deild kvinnur and the most successful in the Faroe Islands. They have won the 1. deild for a record-breaking past 17 seasons consecutively. Since the UEFA Women's Cup began in 2001, they were the only women's team to have represented the Faroe Islands in Europe until 2018, and the only team to have participated in every UEFA competition from the inaugural 2001–02 edition to date.

KÍ Klaksvík currently has eight players on the Faroe Islands women's national football team: Óluva Joensen, Birita Ryan, Sanna Svarvadal, Tórunn Joensen, Tóra Mohr, Hervør Olsen, Maria Biskopstø and Eyðvør Klakstein.

== Honours ==
- 1. deild kvinnur
  - Winners (24): 1997, 2000 to 2016, 2019, 2020, 2021, 2022, 2023, 2025
- Faroese Women's Cup
  - Winners (16): 2000, 2001, 2003, 2004, 2006, 2007, 2008, 2010, 2011, 2012, 2013, 2014, 2015, 2016, 2020, 2022
- Faroese Women's Super Cup
  - Winners (3): 2021, 2023, 2024

== Current squad ==
As of 21 September 2023

Note: Flags indicate national team as defined under FIFA eligibility rules; some limited exceptions apply. Players may hold more than one non-FIFA nationality.

| No. | Pos. | Nation | Player |
|---|---|---|---|
| 1 | GK | FRO | Óluva Joensen |
| 2 | FW | FRO | Malena Olsen |
| 3 | DF | FRO | Birita Ryan |
| 4 | FW | FRO | Hervør Olsen |
| 5 | DF | FRO | Vár Johannesen |
| 6 | DF | FRO | Lóa Samuelsen |
| 7 | DF | FRO | Ragna Patawary |
| 8 | MF | FRO | Malena Josephsen |
| 9 | FW | FRO | Rannvá Andreasen |
| 10 | MF | FRO | Sanna Svarvadal |

| No. | Pos. | Nation | Player |
|---|---|---|---|
| 11 | MF | FRO | Maria Johansen |
| 12 | MF | FRO | Elspa Maria Zachariassen |
| 13 | DF | FRO | Tórunn Joensen |
| 14 | FW | FRO | Tóra Mohr |
| 15 | DF | FRO | Durita Hummeland |
| 16 | GK | FRO | Fanni Turi |
| 17 | DF | FRO | Jórun Najma Patawary |
| 18 | MF | FRO | Jancý Mohr |
| 19 | MF | FRO | Eyðvør Klakstein |
| 22 | FW | FRO | Marjun Hjelm |
| — | FW | FRO | Rebekka Benbakoura |

== History ==
Klaksvíkar Ítróttarfelag was founded in 1904, but the women's team was founded in mid 80's. The women's stadium, is the same stadium as the men's, Djúpumýra. The women from Klaksvík have since the first day, been a very successful team. They won their first Faroese league title in 1997, and again in 2000. In 2000, KÍ women started a 17 years streak, winning the title every year from 2000 to 2016. Because of this, the women also competed in UEFA Women's Cup, and later on competed in UEFA Women's Champions League. After two disappointing years in 2017 and 2018, the KÍ women's now have a streak of 3 more titles, in 2019, 2020 and 2021, bringing the club up to a total of 21 national championships. Their last league title was in 2021.

=== Former internationals ===
- Faroe Islands: Randi Wardum, Ragna Patawary, Malena Josephsen and Rannvá Andreasen

== Results in Europe ==
KÍ qualified for 17 consecutive UEFA Women's Champions League's between 2001–02 and 2017–18. Until the 2018–19 campaign, they were the only team to have qualified for every single Champions League.

| Season | Competition | Round | Country | Opponent | Result | Location |
|---|---|---|---|---|---|---|
| 2001–02 | UEFA Women's Cup | Group Stage | (Austria) | USC Landhaus Vienna | 2–1 | Helsinki |
| 2001–02 | UEFA Women's Cup | Group Stage | (Finland) | HJK Helsinki | 0–4 | Helsinki |
| 2001–02 | UEFA Women's Cup | Group Stage | (Italy) | Torres Terra Sarda | 0–4 | Helsinki |
| 2002–03 | UEFA Women's Cup | Group Stage | (Sweden) | Umeå IK | 0–7 | Umeå |
| 2002–03 | UEFA Women's Cup | Group Stage | (Czech Republic) | Sparta Prague | 0–4 | Umeå |
| 2002–03 | UEFA Women's Cup | Group Stage | (Estonia) | TKSK Visa Tallinn | 2–0 | Umeå |
| 2003–04 | UEFA Women's Cup | Qualifying Round | (England) | Fulham LFC | 0–8 | Sanem |
| 2003–04 | UEFA Women's Cup | Qualifying Round | (Netherlands) | Ter Leede | 0–5 | Sanem |
| 2003–04 | UEFA Women's Cup | Qualifying Round | (Moldova) | FC Codru Anenii Noi | 3–5 | Sanem |
| 2004–05 | UEFA Women's Cup | 1st Round | (Ukraine) | Metalist Kharkov | 1–2 | Wrocław |
| 2004–05 | UEFA Women's Cup | 1st Round | (Poland) | AZS Wroclaw | 1–5 | Wrocław |
| 2004–05 | UEFA Women's Cup | 1st Round | (Wales) | Cardiff City L.F.C. | 4–0 | Wrocław |
| 2005–06 | UEFA Women's Cup | 1st Round | (Switzerland) | SC LUwin.ch | 1–5 | Struga |
| 2005–06 | UEFA Women's Cup | 1st Round | (Moldova) | FC Codru Anenii Noi | 1–4 | Struga |
| 2005–06 | UEFA Women's Cup | 1st Round | (North Macedonia) | KFF Skiponjat | 1–1 | Struga |
| 2006–07 | UEFA Women's Cup | 1st Round | (France) | Juvisy FCF | 0–6 | Livingston |
| 2006–07 | UEFA Women's Cup | 1st Round | (Scotland) | Hibernian L.F.C. | 1–2 | Livingston |
| 2006–07 | UEFA Women's Cup | 1st Round | (Spain) | RCD Espanyol | 0–7 | Livingston |
| 2007–08 | UEFA Women's Cup | 1st Round | (Netherlands) | ADO Den Haag | 1–1 | Klaksvík |
| 2007–08 | UEFA Women's Cup | 1st Round | (Iceland) | Valur Reykjavik | 0–6 | Klaksvík |
| 2007–08 | UEFA Women's Cup | 1st Round | (Finland) | FC Honka | 1–4 | Klaksvík |
| 2008–09 | UEFA Women's Cup | 1st Round | (Hungary) | 1. FC Femina Budapest | 2–2 | Šiauliai |
| 2008–09 | UEFA Women's Cup | 1st Round | (Russia) | Zvezda 2005 Perm | 0–8 | Šiauliai |
| 2008–09 | UEFA Women's Cup | 1st Round | (Lithuania) | Gintra Universitetas | 2–2 | Šiauliai |
| 2009–10 | UEFA Women's Champions League | Qualifying Round | (France) | Montpellier HSC | 0–2 | Strumica |
| 2009–10 | UEFA Women's Champions League | Qualifying Round | (Bulgaria) | FC NSA Sofia | 1–2 | Strumica |
| 2009–10 | UEFA Women's Champions League | Qualifying Round | (North Macedonia) | ZFK Tikvesanka | 4–2 | Strumica |
| 2010–11 | UEFA Women's Champions League | Qualifying Round | (England) | Everton LFC | 0–6 | Šiauliai |
| 2010–11 | UEFA Women's Champions League | Qualifying Round | (Lithuania) | Gintra Universitetas | 0–0 | Šiauliai |
| 2010–11 | UEFA Women's Champions League | Qualifying Round | (North Macedonia) | Borec Veles | 2–0 | Šiauliai |
| 2011–12 | UEFA Women's Champions League | Qualifying Round | (Malta) | Mosta | 1–0 | Subotica |
| 2011–12 | UEFA Women's Champions League | Qualifying Round | (Serbia) | ŽFK Spartak Subotica | 2–4 | Subotica |
| 2011–12 | UEFA Women's Champions League | Qualifying Round | (Scotland) | Glasgow City | 0–5 | Subotica |
| 2012–13 | UEFA Women's Champions League | Qualifying Round | (Cyprus) | Apollon Limassol | 0–7 | Limassol |
| 2012–13 | UEFA Women's Champions League | Qualifying Round | (Ukraine) | WFC Zhytlobud-1 Kharkiv | 1–2 | Limassol |
| 2012–13 | UEFA Women's Champions League | Qualifying Round | (Albania) | Ada Velipojë | 11–1 | Limassol |
| 2013–14 | UEFA Women's Champions League | Qualifying Round | (Montenegro) | ŽFK Ekonomist | 1–1 | Torres Novas |
| 2013–14 | UEFA Women's Champions League | Qualifying Round | (Portugal) | Atlético Ouriense | 1–2 | Fátima |
| 2013–14 | UEFA Women's Champions League | Qualifying Round | (Switzerland) | FC Zürich Frauen | 0–3 | Torres Novas |
| 2014–15 | UEFA Women's Champions League | Qualifying Round | (Albania) | Vllaznia | 1–2 | Šiauliai |
| 2014–15 | UEFA Women's Champions League | Qualifying Round | (Lithuania) | Gintra Universitetas | 0–2 | Šiauliai |
| 2014–15 | UEFA Women's Champions League | Qualifying Round | (Cyprus) | Apollon Limassol | 1–3 | Pakruojis |
| 2015–16 | UEFA Women's Champions League | Qualifying Round | (Cyprus) | Apollon Limassol | 0–2 | Paphos |
| 2015–16 | UEFA Women's Champions League | Qualifying Round | (Iceland) | Stjarnan | 0–4 | Geroskipou |
| 2015–16 | UEFA Women's Champions League | Qualifying Round | (Malta) | Hibernians | 3–3 | Paphos |
| 2016–17 | UEFA Women's Champions League | Qualifying Round | (Cyprus) | Apollon Limassol | 0–5 | Paphos |
| 2016–17 | UEFA Women's Champions League | Qualifying Round | (Greece) | PAOK | 1–1 | Paphos |
| 2016–17 | UEFA Women's Champions League | Qualifying Round | (Kosovo) | Hajvalia | 1–1 | Paphos |
| 2017–18 | UEFA Women's Champions League | Qualifying Round | (Iceland) | Stjarnan | 0–9 | Osijek |
| 2017–18 | UEFA Women's Champions League | Qualifying Round | (Croatia) | ŽNK Osijek | 0–4 | Osijek |
| 2017–18 | UEFA Women's Champions League | Qualifying Round | (North Macedonia) | Istatov | 6–1 | Osijek |
| 2020–21 | UEFA Women's Champions League | Qualifying Round | (Norway) | Vålerenga | 0–7 | Oslo |
| 2021–22 | UEFA Women's Champions League | Round 1 | (Iceland) | Breiðablik | 0–7 | Šiauliai |
| 2021–22 | UEFA Women's Champions League | Round 1 | (Estonia) | Flora | 0–1 | Šiauliai |
| 2022–23 | UEFA Women's Champions League | Round 1 | (Switzerland) | FC Zürich Frauen | 0–6 | Nicosia |
| 2022–23 | UEFA Women's Champions League | Round 1 | (Latvia) | RFS Rïga | 1–2 aet | Nicosia |
| 2023–24 | UEFA Women's Champions League | Round 1 | (Serbia) | Spartak Subotica | 0–7 | Køge |
| 2023–24 | UEFA Women's Champions League | Round 1 | (Denmark) | HB Køge | 1–3 | Køge |
| 2024–25 | UEFA Women's Champions League | Round 1 | (Bosnia and Herzegovina) | SFK 2000 | 0–3 | Sarajevo |
| 2024–25 | UEFA Women's Champions League | Round 1 | (Denmark) | Nordsjælland | 0–2 | Sarajevo |
