= B36 Tórshavn (women) =

- Full name: Bóltfelagið 1936
- Nickname: B36
- Founded: 28 March 1936 (Women's team 1984)
- Ground: Gundadalur, Tórshavn
- Capacity: 4,000
- Chairman: Edvard Heen
- Manager: Eliesar Olsen
- League: Betri kvinnur
- 2025: 5th
- Website: http://www.b36.fo/
Home colours	Away colours

B36 Tórshavn kvinnur is the women's team of B36 Tórshavn, a Faroese football club based in Tórshavn and founded in 1936. The club participate in The Faroese Women's League and plays in black and white. Their stadium, Gundadalur, has a capacity of 4,000. The women's section of B36 was created in 1984.

== History ==
Women's football was officially established at The Faroes in 1985, after a trial year in 1984. B36 Tórshavn immediately established a women's section in the club, and gave it priority. This paid off, and the club won the unofficial title in 1984, and the first official woman's national champions title in 1985. The following years women's football at The Faroes was dominated by teams from the capital. B36 Tórshavn took four national titles during this period, and the local rivals HB Tórshavn took seven.

In the new millennium, KÍ Klaksvík dominated women's football at The Faroes, by winning the title in 17 consecutive years, and taking the national Cup 14 times. This dominance lead to a fading interest in women's football elsewhere. The point of zero came in 2009, were none of the big club from the capital had a women's team in the Premier Division. A couple of years ago the dominance was broken, and the interest for women's football is increasing. This may also be based upon the recent success of the national women's team.

B36 Tórshavn gave women's football the same focus and support as the men's game at the youth level. The club's top women’s team receives equal priority, having a long-term plan to develop home-grown talent and prepare players for senior women’s football.

== Current squad ==
As of 1 June 2026

Note: Flags indicate national team as defined under FIFA eligibility rules; some limited exceptions apply. Players may hold more than one non-FIFA nationality.

No.	Pos.	Nation	Player
1	GK	GHA	Portia Asante
2	DF	FRO	Marta Østerø
3	MF	FRO	Emma Hjaltalin
4	DF	FRO	Maia Thomsen
5	DF	FRO	Elsa Anna Mohr
6	MF	FRO	Lilja av Teigum
7	MF	FRO	Ester Vang
8	DF	BRA	Jiselle Lacerda
9	DF	FRO	Beinta Klemmentsen
10	FW	BRA	Livyan Borges Silva
11	MF	FRO	Ester Ellingsgaard
12	FW	FRO	Rita Maria Dalsgaard
13	MF	FRO	Sesilia Simonsen

No.	Pos.	Nation	Player
15	MF	FRO	Sigga Smæra Næs
16	MF	FRO	Ragnhild Magnusson
17	MF	FRO	Jasmin Darvishi
18	MF	FRO	Bára S. Magnussen (captain)
19	DF	FRO	Sonja T. Dalsgaard
20	MF	FRO	Bára Poulsen
21	DF	FRO	Marin S. Guttesen
22	DF	FRO	Kristvør N. Thomsen
23	MF	FRO	Naomi Nolsøe
27	MF	FRO	Sára Skaalum
—	MF	FRO	Katrina Sjóvará
—	DF	FRO	Gunnrið Poulsen
—	FW	FRO	Anna Maria Heðinsdóttir

== Honours ==
- Betri kvinnur
  - Winners (4): 1985, 1987, 1996, 1998
  - Runners-up (10): 1988, 1994, 1995, 1999, 2001, 2002, 2004, 2005, 2007, 2012
- 1. deild kvinnur
  - Winners (3): 1991, 2010, 2012
  - Winners 1/2 vøll (2): 2009, 2011
- Faroese Women's Cup
  - Winners (6): 1991, 1993, 1994, 1995, 1997, 2005
  - Runners-up (3): 1998, 2008, 2012

=== Honours Youth Academy ===
- Faroe Islands Premier League U-18
  - Winners (4): 1993, 1994, 2000, 2002
- Faroe Islands Cup U-18
  - Winners (2): 2018, 2019
- Faroe Islands Premier League U-16
  - Winners (6): 1998, 2003, 2010, 2014, 2015, 2017
- Faroe Islands Cup U-16
  - Winners (3): 2000, 2014, 2018
- Faroe Islands Premier League U-13
  - Winners (1): 2001
- Faroe Islands Premier League U-11
  - Winners (2): 1996, 2006
