= Havnar Bóltfelag (women) =

- Full name: Havnar Bóltfelag Tórshavn
- Nickname: HB
- Founded: October 4, 1904
- Ground: Gundadalur Stadium; Tórshavn, Faroes
- Capacity: 5,000
- Chairman: Tormodur Stórá
- Manager: John Petersen
- League: 1. deild kvinnur
- 2025: 3rd
- Website: http://www.hb.fo/
Home colours	Away colours

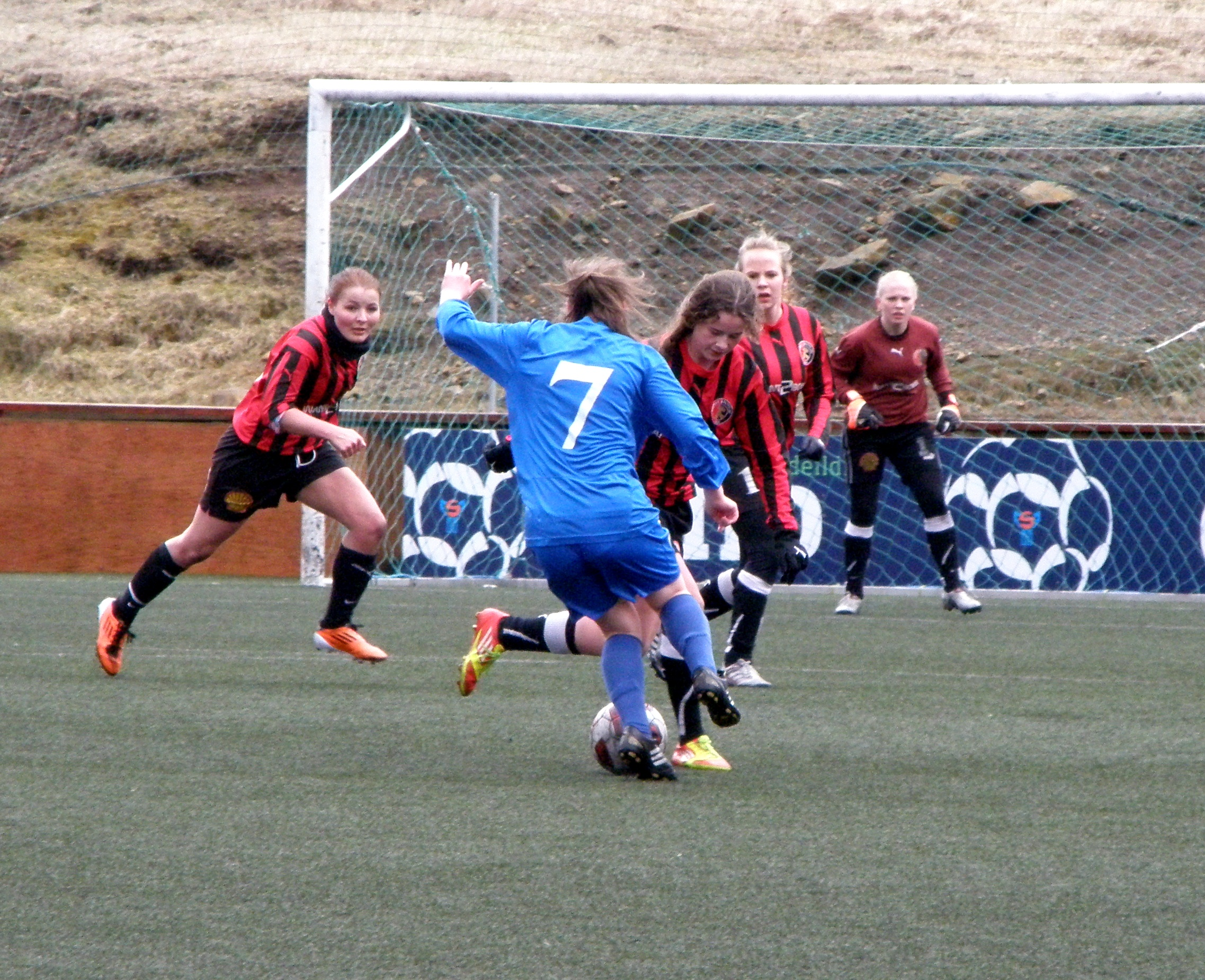
HB Tórshavn vs FC Suðuroy in the women's Faroe Islands Cup. HB won the match 8–1. It was played on 22 April 2012.

HB Tórshavn women is the women's football team of HB Tórshavn, a Faroese-based football club, based in Tórshavn and founded in 1904. The club plays in red and black striped shirts. Their stadium, Gundadalur, has a capacity of 4000.

== Honours ==
- 1. deild kvinnur
  - Winners (7): 1986, 1988, 1989, 1993, 1994, 1995 and 1999
- Faroese Women's Cup
  - Winners (6): 1990, 1996, 1998, 1999, 2001 and 2019
- Faroese Women's Super Cup
  - Winners (1): 2019

== Current squad ==
As of 21 September 2023.

Note: Flags indicate national team as defined under FIFA eligibility rules; some limited exceptions apply. Players may hold more than one non-FIFA nationality.

No.	Pos.	Nation	Player
—	GK	FRO	Monika Biskopstø
—	DF	FRO	Borghild Dánialsdóttir
—	DF	FRO	Sarita Mittfoss
—	DF	FRO	Teresa Jacobsen
—	DF	FRO	Friða Jakobsen
—	FW	FRO	Elin Maria Isaksen
—	MF	FRO	Rúna Jacobsen
—	FW	FRO	Fridrikka Clementsen
—	MF	FRO	Anitha Mortensen

No.	Pos.	Nation	Player
—	DF	FRO	Tina av Skarði
—	MF	FRO	Astrid Mittfoss
—	MF	FRO	Liv Rúnadóttir
—	MF	FRO	Anna Carlsen
—	FW	FRO	Lea Johannesen
—	GK	FRO	Sanna Olsen
—	DF	FRO	Poula Andreasen
—	GK	FRO	Gunnvá Lützen
—	MF	SWE	Sofia Takamäki
