= 2017–18 UEFA Women's Champions League qualifying round =

Tournament details
- Dates: 22–28 August 2017
- Teams: 40 (from 40 associations)

Tournament statistics
- Matches played: 60
- Goals scored: 237 (3.95 per match)
- Attendance: 10,612 (177 per match)
- Top scorer(s): Kader Hançar (6 goals)

The 2017–18 UEFA Women's Champions League qualifying round was played between 22 and 28 August 2017. A total of 40 teams competed in the qualifying round to decide 11 of the 32 places in the knockout phase of the 2017–18 UEFA Women's Champions League.

== Draw ==
The draw of the qualifying round was held on 23 June 2017, 13:30 CEST, at the UEFA headquarters in Nyon, Switzerland. The 40 teams were allocated into four seeding positions based on their UEFA club coefficients at the beginning of the season. They were drawn into ten groups of four containing one team from each of the four seeding positions. First, the ten teams which were pre-selected as hosts were drawn from their own designated pot and allocated to their respective group as per their seeding positions. Next, the remaining 30 teams were drawn from their respective pot which were allocated according to their seeding positions.

Based on the decision taken by the UEFA Emergency Panel at its meeting in Paris on 9 June 2016, teams from Serbia or Bosnia and Herzegovina would not be drawn against teams from Kosovo.

Below were the 40 teams which participated in the qualifying round (with their 2017 UEFA club coefficients, which took into account their performance in European competitions from 2012–13 to 2016–17 plus 33% of their association coefficient from the same time span), with the ten teams which were pre-selected as hosts marked by (H).

Key to colours
Group winners and best runners-up advance to the round of 32

Seeding position 1
Team	Coeff.
(Switzerland) Zürich	43.890
(Kazakhstan) BIIK Kazygurt	24.930
(Cyprus) Apollon Limassol (H)	23.940
(Serbia) Spartak Subotica	20.615
(Romania) Olimpia Cluj (H)	19.950
(Poland) Medyk Konin	19.600
(Belgium) Standard Liège	17.955
(Bosnia and Herzegovina) SFK 2000 (H)	17.290
(Lithuania) Gintra Universitetas	15.960
(Iceland) Stjarnan	15.610

Seeding position 2
Team	Coeff.
(Turkey) Konak Belediyespor	14.960
(Hungary) MTK Hungária (H)	14.620
(Finland) PK-35 Vantaa	13.630
(Austria) Sturm Graz	13.395
(Norway) Avaldsnes	12.075
(Scotland) Hibernian	11.580
(Belarus) FC Minsk	10.800
(Greece) PAOK	10.305
(Croatia) Osijek (H)	9.975
(Netherlands) Ajax	8.250

Seeding position 3
Team	Coeff.
(Estonia) Pärnu (H)	7.315
(Bulgaria) NSA Sofia	6.650
(Faroe Islands) KÍ Klaksvík	3.990
(Slovenia) Olimpija Ljubljana (H)	3.630
(Portugal) Sporting CP	3.465
(Ukraine) Zhytlobud-2 Kharkiv	3.135
(Republic of Ireland) Shelbourne	2.805
(Israel) Kiryat Gat	2.310
(Albania) Vllaznia	1.995
(Slovakia) Partizán Bardejov	1.485

Seeding position 4
Team	Coeff.
(Kosovo) Hajvalia	1.330
(Latvia) Rīgas FS	1.330
(Montenegro) Breznica Pljevlja (H)	0.995
(Northern Ireland) Linfield (H)	0.990
(Wales) Swansea City	0.660
(North Macedonia) Istatov	0.330
(Moldova) Noroc Nimoreni	0.165
(Malta) Birkirkara	0.165
(Luxembourg) Bettembourg	0.000
(Georgia (country)) Martve (H)	0.000

== Format ==
In each group, teams played against each other in a round-robin mini-tournament at the pre-selected hosts. The ten group winners and the runners-up with the best record against the teams finishing first and third in their group advanced to the round of 32 to join the 21 teams which received a bye.

=== Tiebreakers ===
Teams were ranked according to points (3 points for a win, 1 point for a draw, 0 points for a loss), and if tied on points, the following tiebreaking criteria were applied, in the order given, to determine the rankings (Regulations Articles 14.01 and 14.02):

1. Points in head-to-head matches among tied teams;
2. Goal difference in head-to-head matches among tied teams;
3. Goals scored in head-to-head matches among tied teams;
4. If more than two teams are tied, and after applying all head-to-head criteria above, a subset of teams are still tied, all head-to-head criteria above are reapplied exclusively to this subset of teams;
5. Goal difference in all group matches;
6. Goals scored in all group matches;
7. Penalty shoot-out if only two teams have the same number of points, and they met in the last round of the group and are tied after applying all criteria above (not used if more than two teams have the same number of points, or if their rankings are not relevant for qualification for the next stage);
8. Disciplinary points (red card = 3 points, yellow card = 1 point, expulsion for two yellow cards in one match = 3 points);
9. UEFA club coefficient.

To determine the best runner-up, the results against the teams in fourth place were discarded. The following criteria were applied (Regulations Article 14.03):

1. Points;
2. Goal difference;
3. Goals scored;
4. Disciplinary points;
5. UEFA club coefficient.

== Groups ==
The matches were played on 22, 25 and 28 August 2017. In each group, the schedule was as follows (Regulations Article 19.05):

Matchday	Date	Matches
Matchday 1	22 August 2017	1 v 3, 2 v 4
Matchday 2	25 August 2017	1 v 4, 3 v 2
Matchday 3	28 August 2017	2 v 1, 4 v 3

All times were CEST (UTC+2).

=== Group 1 ===
Pos	Team	Pld	W	D	L	GF	GA	GD	Pts	Qualification	GIN	BEL	BAR	MAR
1	(Lithuania) Gintra Universitetas	3	3	0	0	13	1	+12	9	Round of 32	—	—	4–0	6–0
2	(Turkey) Konak Belediyespor	3	2	0	1	11	4	+7	6		1–3	—	—	5–0
3	(Slovakia) Partizán Bardejov	3	1	0	2	4	9	−5	3		—	1–5	—	—
4	(Georgia (country)) Martve (H)	3	0	0	3	0	14	−14	0		—	—	0–3	—

Source: UEFA
(H) Hosts
22 August 2017
15:00

Konak Belediyespor (Turkey)	5–0	(Georgia (country)) Martve
Dușa 33'; Hançar 35', 90+3'; Çınar 41', 54'	Report

Mikheil Meskhi Stadium-2, Tbilisi
Attendance: 350
Referee: Sarah Garratt (England)
22 August 2017
17:00

Gintra Universitetas (Lithuania)	4–0	(Slovakia) Partizán Bardejov
Coleman 22', 89'; Alekperova 23'; Čubrilo 37'	Report

David Petriashvili Stadium, Tbilisi
Attendance: 40
Referee: Vesna Budimir (Croatia)

25 August 2017
15:00

Gintra Universitetas (Lithuania)	6–0	(Georgia (country)) Martve
Alekperova 5'; Čubrilo 28'; Vaitukaitytė 56', 79'; Coleman 63'; Veličkaitė 89'	Report

Mikheil Meskhi Stadium-2, Tbilisi
Attendance: 72
Referee: Hannelore Onsea (Belgium)
25 August 2017
17:00

Partizán Bardejov (Slovakia)	1–5	(Turkey) Konak Belediyespor
Bochinová 12'	Report	Çınar 9'; Esra Erol 30'; Hançar 37', 61', 70'

David Petriashvili Stadium, Tbilisi
Attendance: 40
Referee: Sarah Garratt (England)

28 August 2017
17:00

Konak Belediyespor (Turkey)	1–3	(Lithuania) Gintra Universitetas
Hançar 54'	Report	Alekperova 40', 82' (pen.); Vaitukaitytė 86'

David Petriashvili Stadium, Tbilisi
Attendance: 44
Referee: Vesna Budimir (Croatia)
28 August 2017
17:00

Martve (Georgia (country))	0–3	(Slovakia) Partizán Bardejov
	Report	Semanová 6', 48'; Gasviani 34' (o.g.)

Mikheil Meskhi Stadium-2, Tbilisi
Attendance: 31
Referee: Hannelore Onsea (Belgium)

=== Group 2 ===
Pos	Team	Pld	W	D	L	GF	GA	GD	Pts	Qualification	CLU	HIB	KHA	SWA
1	(Romania) Olimpia Cluj (H)	3	2	1	0	5	1	+4	7	Round of 32	—	—	1–0	3–0
2	(Scotland) Hibernian	3	1	2	0	7	2	+5	5		1–1	—	—	5–0
3	(Ukraine) Zhytlobud-2 Kharkiv	3	1	1	1	10	2	+8	4		—	1–1	—	—
4	(Wales) Swansea City	3	0	0	3	0	17	−17	0		—	—	0–9	—

Source: UEFA
(H) Hosts
22 August 2017
10:00

Hibernian (Scotland)	5–0	(Wales) Swansea City
Small 11'; Turner 18'; Graham 42' (pen.), 87'; Hunter 48'	Report

Cluj Arena, Cluj-Napoca
Attendance: 102
Referee: Julia-Stefanie Baier (Austria)
22 August 2017
17:00

Olimpia Cluj (Romania)	1–0	(Ukraine) Zhytlobud-2 Kharkiv
Carp 33'	Report

Cluj Arena, Cluj-Napoca
Attendance: 350
Referee: Florence Guillemin (France)

25 August 2017
10:00

Zhytlobud-2 Kharkiv (Ukraine)	1–1	(Scotland) Hibernian
Malakhova 43'	Report	Graham 80'

Cluj Arena, Cluj-Napoca
Attendance: 100
Referee: Julia-Stefanie Baier (Austria)
25 August 2017
17:00

Olimpia Cluj (Romania)	3–0	(Wales) Swansea City
Carp 28'; Lunca 52'; Voicu 58'	Report

Cluj Arena, Cluj-Napoca
Attendance: 350
Referee: Ewa Augustyn (Poland)

28 August 2017
17:00

Hibernian (Scotland)	1–1	(Romania) Olimpia Cluj
Graham 84'	Report	Lunca 5'

Cluj Arena, Cluj-Napoca
Attendance: 250
Referee: Florence Guillemin (France)
28 August 2017
17:00

Swansea City (Wales)	0–9	(Ukraine) Zhytlobud-2 Kharkiv
	Report	Vasylyuk 2'; Kalinina 6'; Polyukhovych 20', 30', 90+4'; Skorynina 44', 57'; Djatel 55'; Malakhova 60'

Stadionul Clujana, Cluj-Napoca
Attendance: 60
Referee: Ewa Augustyn (Poland)

=== Group 3 ===
Pos	Team	Pld	W	D	L	GF	GA	GD	Pts	Qualification	AJA	LIE	PÄR	RIG
1	(Netherlands) Ajax	3	3	0	0	11	1	+10	9	Round of 32	—	3–0	—	6–0
2	(Belgium) Standard Liège	3	2	0	1	10	3	+7	6		—	—	2–0	8–0
3	(Estonia) Pärnu (H)	3	1	0	2	3	4	−1	3		1–2	—	—	—
4	(Latvia) Rīgas FS	3	0	0	3	0	16	−16	0		—	—	0–2	—

Source: UEFA
(H) Hosts
22 August 2017
11:00

Ajax (Netherlands)	6–0	(Latvia) Rīgas FS
Van den Bighelaar 4'; Van Dongen 45+1', 53'; Spruntule 50' (o.g.), 74' (o.g.); Lūse 89' (o.g.)	Report

Pärnu Rannastaadion, Pärnu
Attendance: 119
Referee: Ivana Martinčić (Croatia)
22 August 2017
19:00

Standard Liège (Belgium)	2–0	(Estonia) Pärnu
Knapen 56'; Gelders 69'	Report

Pärnu Rannastaadion, Pärnu
Attendance: 630
Referee: Amy Rayner (England)

25 August 2017
11:00

Standard Liège (Belgium)	8–0	(Latvia) Rīgas FS
Marinucci 4'; Gelders 19' (pen.), 36'; Wajnblum 26'; Cranshoff 39'; Hannecart 56'; Dinon 62'; Wolters 67'	Report

Pärnu Rannastaadion, Pärnu
Attendance: 120
Referee: Karolina Radzik-Johan (Poland)
25 August 2017
17:00

Pärnu (Estonia)	1–2	(Netherlands) Ajax
Morkovkina 45+3'	Report	Payne 17'; Van den Bighelaar 31'

Pärnu Rannastaadion, Pärnu
Attendance: 750
Referee: Ivana Martinčić (Croatia)

28 August 2017
17:00

Ajax (Netherlands)	3–0	(Belgium) Standard Liège
Van Lunteren 10' (pen.), 25'; Bakker 16'	Report

Vändra Stadium, Vändra
Attendance: 250
Referee: Amy Rayner (England)
28 August 2017
17:00

Rīgas FS (Latvia)	0–2	(Estonia) Pärnu
	Report	Himanen 70'; Bannikova 72'

Pärnu Rannastaadion, Pärnu
Attendance: 353
Referee: Karolina Radzik-Johan (Poland)

=== Group 4 ===
Pos	Team	Pld	W	D	L	GF	GA	GD	Pts	Qualification	KON	SHE	VAN	LIN
1	(Poland) Medyk Konin	3	2	1	0	6	2	+4	7	Round of 32	—	0–0	—	4–1
2	(Republic of Ireland) Shelbourne	3	1	2	0	3	1	+2	5		—	—	0–0	—
3	(Finland) PK-35 Vantaa	3	1	1	1	2	2	0	4		1–2	—	—	1–0
4	(Northern Ireland) Linfield (H)	3	0	0	3	2	8	−6	0		—	1–3	—	—

Source: UEFA
(H) Hosts
22 August 2017
15:00

Medyk Konin (Poland)	0–0	(Republic of Ireland) Shelbourne
	Report

Seaview, Belfast
Attendance: 213
Referee: Sofia Karagiorgi (Cyprus)
22 August 2017
20:30

PK-35 Vantaa (Finland)	1–0	(Northern Ireland) Linfield
Collin 39'	Report

Seaview, Belfast
Attendance: 252
Referee: Marta Frias Acedo (Spain)

25 August 2017
15:00

Medyk Konin (Poland)	4–1	(Northern Ireland) Linfield
Dudek 8'; Casidee 26'; Gawrońska 36'; Kindzierski 82'	Report	Bell 73'

Seaview, Belfast
Attendance: 102
Referee: Désirée Grundbacher (Switzerland)
25 August 2017
20:30

Shelbourne (Republic of Ireland)	0–0	(Finland) PK-35 Vantaa
	Report

Seaview, Belfast
Attendance: 157
Referee: Marta Frias Acedo (Spain)

28 August 2017
17:00

PK-35 Vantaa (Finland)	1–2	(Poland) Medyk Konin
Franssi 39'	Report	Balcerzak 4'; Pakulska 77'

Solitude, Belfast
Attendance: 58
Referee: Sofia Karagiorgi (Cyprus)
28 August 2017
17:00

Linfield (Northern Ireland)	1–3	(Republic of Ireland) Shelbourne
Bell 83'	Report	Donnolly 63'; Mooney 88'; Prior 90+3'

Seaview, Belfast
Attendance: 281
Referee: Désirée Grundbacher (Switzerland)

=== Group 5 ===
Pos	Team	Pld	W	D	L	GF	GA	GD	Pts	Qualification	LIM	GRA	SOF	NIM
1	(Cyprus) Apollon Limassol (H)	3	3	0	0	14	1	+13	9	Round of 32	—	—	4–0	6–0
2	(Austria) Sturm Graz	3	2	0	1	8	5	+3	6		1–4	—	—	4–0
3	(Bulgaria) NSA Sofia	3	1	0	2	2	7	−5	3		—	1–3	—	—
4	(Moldova) Noroc Nimoreni	3	0	0	3	0	11	−11	0		—	—	0–1	—

Source: UEFA
(H) Hosts
22 August 2017
16:45

Apollon Limassol (Cyprus)	4–0	(Bulgaria) NSA Sofia
Ayane 10'; Molin 16'; Lagonia 36'; Rus 65'	Report

Makario Stadium, Nicosia
Attendance: 99
Referee: Lois Otte (Belgium)
22 August 2017
20:00

Sturm Graz (Austria)	4–0	(Moldova) Noroc Nimoreni
Naschenweng 60', 81'; Kofler 66', 70'	Report

Makario Stadium, Nicosia
Attendance: 20
Referee: Tanja Subotič (Slovenia)

25 August 2017
16:45

NSA Sofia (Bulgaria)	1–3	(Austria) Sturm Graz
Radoyska 22'	Report	Frieser 21'; Naschenweng 30'; Cancienne 56'

Makario Stadium, Nicosia
Attendance: 25
Referee: Tanja Subotič (Slovenia)
25 August 2017
20:00

Apollon Limassol (Cyprus)	6–0	(Moldova) Noroc Nimoreni
Lagonia 6'; Ayane 21', 26', 49'; Rus 64'; Iordanou 84'	Report

Makario Stadium, Nicosia
Attendance: 110
Referee: Marta Huerta De Aza (Spain)

28 August 2017
17:00

Sturm Graz (Austria)	1–4	(Cyprus) Apollon Limassol
Naschenweng 55'	Report	Molin 16'; Kynossidou 35'; Ayane 40'; Rus 74'

Makario Stadium, Nicosia
Attendance: 230
Referee: Lois Otte (Belgium)
28 August 2017
17:00

Noroc Nimoreni (Moldova)	0–1	(Bulgaria) NSA Sofia
	Report	Koshuleva 42'

THOI Lakatamia Stadium, Nicosia
Attendance: 5
Referee: Marta Huerta De Aza (Spain)

=== Group 6 ===
Pos	Team	Pld	W	D	L	GF	GA	GD	Pts	Qualification	MIN	ZÜR	LJU	BIR
1	(Belarus) FC Minsk	3	2	1	0	13	0	+13	7	Round of 32	—	0–0	—	8–0
2	(Switzerland) Zürich	3	2	1	0	7	1	+6	7	Round of 32	—	—	2–1	5–0
3	(Slovenia) Olimpija Ljubljana (H)	3	1	0	2	2	7	−5	3		0–5	—	—	—
4	(Malta) Birkirkara	3	0	0	3	0	14	−14	0		—	—	0–1	—

Source: UEFA
(H) Hosts
22 August 2017
13:00

Zürich (Switzerland)	2–1	(Slovenia) Olimpija Ljubljana
Ramseier 55', 83'	Report	Mori 57'

ŽŠD Ljubljana Stadium, Ljubljana
Attendance: 250
Referee: Eleni Lampadariou (Greece)
22 August 2017
17:15

FC Minsk (Belarus)	8–0	(Malta) Birkirkara
Pilipenko 8', 11', 15'; Linnik 21'; Khimich 25' (pen.), 69'; Duben 41' (pen.); Miroshnichenko 87'	Report

ŽŠD Ljubljana Stadium, Ljubljana
Attendance: 50
Referee: Elvira Nurmustafina (Kazakhstan)

25 August 2017
13:00

Zürich (Switzerland)	5–0	(Malta) Birkirkara
Willi 12'; Stierli 40', 43'; Moser 73', 89' (pen.)	Report

ŽŠD Ljubljana Stadium, Ljubljana
Attendance: 100
Referee: Tess Olofsson (Sweden)
25 August 2017
17:15

Olimpija Ljubljana (Slovenia)	0–5	(Belarus) FC Minsk
	Report	Borisenko 30'; Pilipenko 52'; Abambila 68'; Khimich 88', 90+1'

ŽŠD Ljubljana Stadium, Ljubljana
Attendance: 280
Referee: Elvira Nurmustafina (Kazakhstan)

28 August 2017
17:00

FC Minsk (Belarus)	0–0	(Switzerland) Zürich
	Report

ŽŠD Ljubljana Stadium, Ljubljana
Attendance: 50
Referee: Eleni Lampadariou (Greece)
28 August 2017
17:00

Birkirkara (Malta)	0–1	(Slovenia) Olimpija Ljubljana
	Report	Golob 90+3'

Stožice Stadium, Ljubljana
Attendance: 120
Referee: Viola Raudziņa (Latvia)

=== Group 7 ===
Pos	Team	Pld	W	D	L	GF	GA	GD	Pts	Qualification	STJ	OSI	KLA	IST
1	(Iceland) Stjarnan	3	3	0	0	21	0	+21	9	Round of 32	—	—	9–0	11–0
2	(Croatia) Osijek (H)	3	2	0	1	11	1	+10	6		0–1	—	—	7–0
3	(Faroe Islands) KÍ Klaksvík	3	1	0	2	6	14	−8	3		—	0–4	—	—
4	(North Macedonia) Istatov	3	0	0	3	1	24	−23	0		—	—	1–6	—

Source: UEFA
(H) Hosts
22 August 2017
16:00

Stjarnan (Iceland)	9–0	(Faroe Islands) KÍ Klaksvík
Albertsdóttir 8'; Óladóttir 31', 41'; Josephsen 33' (o.g.); Henry 35', 69'; Ásbjörnsdóttir 42'; Björnsdóttir 44'; Pedersen 90+7'	Report

Stadion Gradski vrt, Osijek
Attendance: 43
Referee: Lorraine Clark (Scotland)
22 August 2017
20:15

Osijek (Croatia)	7–0	(North Macedonia) Istatov
Balić 10', 59', 77'; Nevrkla 45+2'; Andrlić 79'; Jakovac 89'; Lojna 90'	Report

Stadion Gradski vrt, Osijek
Attendance: 178
Referee: Maria Marotta (Italy)

25 August 2017
16:00

Stjarnan (Iceland)	11–0	(North Macedonia) Istatov
White 17'; Ásbjörnsdóttir 31', 43', 62'; Óladóttir 42', 45+3'; Henry 47', 51', 53'; Gudrunardóttir 87'; Krsteska 90+1' (o.g.)	Report

Stadion Gradski vrt, Osijek
Attendance: 39
Referee: Melis Özçiğdem (Turkey)
25 August 2017
20:15

KÍ Klaksvík (Faroe Islands)	0–4	(Croatia) Osijek
	Report	Andrlić 8'; Bojčić 67'; Nevrkla 70'; Jakovac 85'

Stadion Gradski vrt, Osijek
Attendance: 350
Referee: Maria Marotta (Italy)

28 August 2017
17:00

Osijek (Croatia)	0–1	(Iceland) Stjarnan
	Report	Ásbjörnsdóttir 69'

Stadion Gradski vrt, Osijek
Attendance: 400
Referee: Lorraine Clark (Scotland)
28 August 2017
17:00

Istatov (North Macedonia)	1–6	(Faroe Islands) KÍ Klaksvík
Jakovska 37'	Report	Lakjuni 12', 45+1', 64', 66'; Jacobsen 29'; Klakstein 83'

Stadion HNK Cibalia, Vinkovci
Attendance: 100
Referee: Melis Özçiğdem (Turkey)

=== Group 8 ===
Pos	Team	Pld	W	D	L	GF	GA	GD	Pts	Qualification	KAZ	SPO	HUN	HAJ
1	(Kazakhstan) BIIK Kazygurt	3	3	0	0	6	1	+5	9	Round of 32	—	2–1	—	1–0
2	(Portugal) Sporting CP	3	2	0	1	7	3	+4	6		—	—	2–0	—
3	(Hungary) MTK Hungária (H)	3	1	0	2	2	5	−3	3		0–3	—	—	2–0
4	(Kosovo) Hajvalia	3	0	0	3	1	7	−6	0		—	1–4	—	—

Source: UEFA
(H) Hosts
22 August 2017
17:00

BIIK Kazygurt (Kazakhstan)	2–1	(Portugal) Sporting CP
Ihezuo 7'; Adule 83'	Report	Silva 10'

Hévízi úti Stadion, Budapest
Attendance: 300
Referee: Zuzana Kováčová (Slovakia)
22 August 2017
17:00

MTK Hungária (Hungary)	2–0	(Kosovo) Hajvalia
Szabó 60'; Méry 83'	Report

Hidegkuti Nándor Stadion, Budapest
Attendance: 250
Referee: Eleni Antoniou (Greece)

25 August 2017
17:00

BIIK Kazygurt (Kazakhstan)	1–0	(Kosovo) Hajvalia
Gabelia 14'	Report

Hévízi úti Stadion, Budapest
Attendance: 150
Referee: Galiya Echeva (Bulgaria)
25 August 2017
17:00

Sporting CP (Portugal)	2–0	(Hungary) MTK Hungária
Leite 61'; Carvalhas 79'	Report

Hidegkuti Nándor Stadion, Budapest
Attendance: 500
Referee: Eleni Antoniou (Greece)

28 August 2017
17:00

MTK Hungária (Hungary)	0–3	(Kazakhstan) BIIK Kazygurt
	Report	Ihezuo 38'; Gabelia 48'; Szőcs 53' (o.g.)

Hidegkuti Nándor Stadion, Budapest
Attendance: 250
Referee: Zuzana Kováčová (Slovakia)
28 August 2017
17:00

Hajvalia (Kosovo)	1–4	(Portugal) Sporting CP
Shala 17'	Report	Silva 11'; Leite 40'; Pinto 62' (pen.), 64'

Hévízi úti Stadion, Budapest
Attendance: 150
Referee: Galiya Echeva (Bulgaria)

=== Group 9 ===
Pos	Team	Pld	W	D	L	GF	GA	GD	Pts	Qualification	AVA	SUB	PLJ	KIR
1	(Norway) Avaldsnes	3	3	0	0	10	3	+7	9	Round of 32	—	2–0	2–1	—
2	(Serbia) Spartak Subotica	3	2	0	1	13	3	+10	6		—	—	6–0	7–1
3	(Montenegro) Breznica Pljevlja (H)	3	0	1	2	3	10	−7	1		—	—	—	2–2
4	(Israel) Kiryat Gat	3	0	1	2	5	15	−10	1		2–6	—	—	—

Source: UEFA
(H) Hosts
22 August 2017
17:00

Spartak Subotica (Serbia)	7–1	(Israel) Kiryat Gat
Dorine 13'; Slović 22' (pen.); Radojičić 25', 26'; Marcela 48'; Filipović 60', 70'	Report	Schulmann 45'

Gradski stadion, Nikšić
Attendance: 70
Referee: Paula Brady (Ireland)
22 August 2017
17:30

Avaldsnes (Norway)	2–1	(Montenegro) Breznica Pljevlja
Gielnik 33'; Thorsnes 75'	Report	Djurković 22'

Podgorica City Stadium, Podgorica
Attendance: 200
Referee: Tania Fernandes Morais (Luxembourg)

25 August 2017
11:00

Kiryat Gat (Israel)	2–6	(Norway) Avaldsnes
Efraim 57' (pen.); Schulmann 64'	Report	Luana 8'; Thorsnes 17'; Rosa 19'; Pedersen 41', 72'; Gielnik 55'

Gradski stadion, Nikšić
Attendance: 50
Referee: Tania Fernandes Morais (Luxembourg)
25 August 2017
17:30

Spartak Subotica (Serbia)	6–0	(Montenegro) Breznica Pljevlja
Pavlović 4'; Slović 29' (pen.), 43'; Radojičić 30'; Dorine 76'; Krstanovska 90'	Report

Podgorica City Stadium, Podgorica
Attendance: 150
Referee: Ana Aguiar (Portugal)

28 August 2017
17:00

Avaldsnes (Norway)	2–0	(Serbia) Spartak Subotica
Daiane 19'; Logarzo 67'	Report

Gradski stadion, Nikšić
Attendance: 70
Referee: Paula Brady (Ireland)
28 August 2017
17:00

Breznica Pljevlja (Montenegro)	2–2	(Israel) Kiryat Gat
Jankov 29' (pen.); Bojat 36'	Report	Schulmann 10'; Efraim 30'

Podgorica City Stadium, Podgorica
Attendance: 62
Referee: Ana Aguiar (Portugal)

=== Group 10 ===
Pos	Team	Pld	W	D	L	GF	GA	GD	Pts	Qualification	PAO	VLL	SFK	BET
1	(Greece) PAOK	3	3	0	0	12	0	+12	9	Round of 32	—	—	3–0	8–0
2	(Albania) Vllaznia	3	2	0	1	3	1	+2	6		0–1	—	—	—
3	(Bosnia and Herzegovina) SFK 2000 (H)	3	1	0	2	3	4	−1	3		—	0–1	—	3–0
4	(Luxembourg) Bettembourg	3	0	0	3	0	13	−13	0		—	0–2	—	—

Source: UEFA
(H) Hosts
22 August 2017
11:00

PAOK (Greece)	8–0	(Luxembourg) Bettembourg
Dimitrijević 7', 61'; Vardali 10', 72'; Brame 49'; Panteliadou 51', 75', 88'	Report

Asim Ferhatović Hase Stadium, Sarajevo
Attendance: 50
Referee: Graziella Pirriatore (Italy)
22 August 2017
17:00

SFK 2000 (Bosnia and Herzegovina)	0–1	(Albania) Vllaznia
	Report	Doci 90+2'

Asim Ferhatović Hase Stadium, Sarajevo
Attendance: 350
Referee: Vivian Peeters (Netherlands)

25 August 2017
11:00

SFK 2000 (Bosnia and Herzegovina)	3–0	(Luxembourg) Bettembourg
Kapetanović 19'; Kuljanin 54'; Al. Spahić 78'	Report

Asim Ferhatović Hase Stadium, Sarajevo
Attendance: 125
Referee: Rebecca Welch (England)
25 August 2017
17:00

Vllaznia (Albania)	0–1	(Greece) PAOK
	Report	Gkatsou 90+2' (pen.)

Asim Ferhatović Hase Stadium, Sarajevo
Attendance: 32
Referee: Graziella Pirriatore (Italy)

28 August 2017
17:00

PAOK (Greece)	3–0	(Bosnia and Herzegovina) SFK 2000
Brame 16'; Strantzali 51'; Markou 58'	Report

Asim Ferhatović Hase Stadium, Sarajevo
Attendance: 280
Referee: Vivian Peeters (Netherlands)
28 August 2017
17:00

Bettembourg (Luxembourg)	0–2	(Albania) Vllaznia
	Report	Maliqi 9'; Maksuti 23'

Stadion Grbavica, Sarajevo
Attendance: 50
Referee: Rebecca Welch (England)

== Ranking of second-placed teams ==
To determine the best second-placed team from the qualifying round which advanced to the knockout phase, only the results of the second-placed teams against the first and third-placed teams in their group were taken into account, while results against the fourth-placed team were not included. As a result, two matches played by each second-placed team counted for the purposes of determining the ranking.

Pos	Grp	Team	Pld	W	D	L	GF	GA	GD	Pts	Qualification
1	6	(Switzerland) Zürich	2	1	1	0	2	1	+1	4	Round of 32
2	9	(Serbia) Spartak Subotica	2	1	0	1	6	2	+4	3	
3	7	(Croatia) Osijek	2	1	0	1	4	1	+3	3	
4	1	(Turkey) Konak Belediyespor	2	1	0	1	6	4	+2	3	
5	8	(Portugal) Sporting CP	2	1	0	1	3	2	+1	3	
6	10	(Albania) Vllaznia	2	1	0	1	1	1	0	3	
7	5	(Austria) Sturm Graz	2	1	0	1	4	5	−1	3	
8	3	(Belgium) Standard Liège	2	1	0	1	2	3	−1	3	
9	2	(Scotland) Hibernian	2	0	2	0	2	2	0	2	
10	4	(Republic of Ireland) Shelbourne	2	0	2	0	0	0	0	2	

Source: UEFA
Rules for classification: 1) points; 2) goal difference; 3) goals scored; 4) disciplinary points; 5) coefficient.
