= Serbian Footballer of the Year =

Annual sports award

The Football Association of Serbia Golden Ball (Serbian: Златна лопта Фудбалског савеза Србије / Zlatna lopta Fudbalskog saveza Srbije) is an annual award given to players and coaches who are adjudged to have been the best of the year in Serbian football. The award has been presented since 2005.

== Winners ==
=== Footballer of the Year ===
Year	Footballer of the Year	Club
2005	Nemanja Vidić	(Russia) Spartak Moscow
2006	Dejan Stanković	(Italy) Internazionale
2007	Nikola Žigić	(Spain) Valencia
2008	Nemanja Vidić (2)	(England) Manchester United
2009	Miloš Krasić	(Russia) CSKA Moscow
2010	Dejan Stanković (2)	(Italy) Internazionale (2)
2011	Aleksandar Kolarov	(England) Manchester City
2012	Branislav Ivanović	(England) Chelsea
2013	Branislav Ivanović (2)	(England) Chelsea (2)
2014	Nemanja Matić	(England) Chelsea (3)
2015	Nemanja Matić (2)	(England) Chelsea (4)
2016	Dušan Tadić	(England) Southampton
2017	Vladimir Stojković	(Serbia) Partizan
2018	Aleksandar Mitrović	(England) Fulham
2019	Dušan Tadić (2)	(Netherlands) Ajax
2020	Not awarded	
2021	Dušan Tadić (3)	(Netherlands) Ajax (2)
2022	Aleksandar Mitrović (2)	(England) Fulham (2)
2023	Aleksandar Mitrović (3)	(Saudi Arabia) Al Hilal
2024	Dušan Vlahović	(Italy) Juventus
2025	Nikola Milenković	(England) Nottingham Forest

==== Trivia ====
No.	Players	Years
3	Dušan Tadić	2016, 2019, 2021
3	Aleksandar Mitrović	2018, 2022, 2023
2	Nemanja Vidić	2005, 2008
2	Dejan Stanković	2006, 2010
2	Branislav Ivanović	2012, 2013
2	Nemanja Matić	2014, 2015
1	Nikola Žigić	2007
1	Miloš Krasić	2009
1	Aleksandar Kolarov	2011
1	Vladimir Stojković	2017
1	Dušan Vlahović	2024
1	Nikola Milenković	2025

No.	Clubs	Years
4	(England) Chelsea	2012, 2013, 2014, 2015
2	(Italy) Internazionale	2006, 2010
2	(England) Fulham	2018, 2022
2	(Netherlands) Ajax	2019, 2021
1	(Russia) Spartak Moscow	2005
1	(Spain) Valencia	2007
1	(England) Manchester United	2008
1	(Russia) CSKA Moscow	2009
1	(England) Manchester City	2011
1	(England) Southampton	2016
1	(Serbia) Partizan	2017
1	(Saudi Arabia) Al Hilal	2023
1	(Italy) Juventus	2024
1	(England) Nottingham Forest	2025

No.	Leagues	Years
10	(England) Premier League	2008, 2011, 2012, 2013, 2014, 2015, 2016, 2018, 2022, 2025
3	(Italy) Serie A	2006, 2010, 2024
2	(Russia) Russian Premier League	2005, 2009
2	(Netherlands) Eredivisie	2019, 2021
1	(Spain) La Liga	2007
1	(Serbia) Serbian SuperLiga	2017
1	(Saudi Arabia) Saudi Pro League	2023

=== Female Footballer of the Year ===
Year	Footballer of the Year	Club
2019	Violeta Slović	(Serbia) Spartak Subotica
2020	Not awarded	
2021	Jelena Čanković	(Sweden) Rosengård
2022	Jovana Damnjanović	(Germany) Bayern Munich
2023	Violeta Slović (2)	(Serbia) Spartak Subotica (2)
2024	Nina Matejić	(Serbia) Red Star Belgrade
2025	Tijana Filipović	(Russia) Spartak Moscow

==== Trivia ====
No.	Players	Years
2	Violeta Slović	2019, 2023
1	Jelena Čanković	2021
1	Jovana Damnjanović	2022
1	Nina Matejić	2024
1	Tijana Filipović	2025

No.	Clubs	Years
2	(Serbia) Spartak Subotica	2019, 2023
1	(Sweden) Rosengård	2021
1	(Germany) Bayern Munich	2022
1	(Serbia) Red Star Belgrade	2024
1	(Russia) Spartak Moscow	2025

No.	Leagues	Years
3	(Serbia) Serbian SuperLiga	2019, 2023, 2024
1	(Sweden) Damallsvenskan	2021
1	(Germany) Frauen-Bundesliga	2022
1	(Russia) Top Division	2025

== Coach of the Year ==
On the same occasion is also given an award for Serbian Football Coach of the Year.

Year	Coach of the Year	Club / Nation
2005	Ilija Petković	Serbia and Montenegro national football team
2006	Ljubiša Tumbaković	(China) Shandong Luneng
2007	Miroslav Đukić	Partizan; Serbia national football team
2008	Slaviša Jokanović	(Serbia) Partizan (2)
2009	Radomir Antić	Serbia national football team (2)
2010	Milovan Rajevac	Ghana national football team
2011	Ivan Jovanović	(Cyprus) APOEL
2012	Dragan Okuka	(China) Jiangsu Sainty
2013	Ljubinko Drulović	Serbia national under-19 football team
2014	Radovan Ćurčić	Serbia national under-21 football team
2015	Veljko Paunović	Serbia national under-20 football team
2016	Dragan Stojković	(China) Guangzhou R&F
2017	Vladan Milojević	(Serbia) Red Star Belgrade
2018	Vladan Milojević (2)	(Serbia) Red Star Belgrade (2)
2019	Siniša Mihajlović	(Italy) Bologna
2020	Not awarded	
2021	Dragan Stojković (2)	Serbia national football team (3)
2022	Dragan Stojković (3)	Serbia national football team (4)
2023	Dragan Stojković (4)	Serbia national football team (5)
2024	Vladan Milojević (3)	(Serbia) Red Star Belgrade (3)
2025	Lidija Stojkanović	Serbia women's national football team

== See also ==
- Serbian Sportspersonality of the Year
- Awards of Olympic Committee of Serbia
- Serbian Basketball Player of the Year
