= Tijana Krstić =

Serbian footballer (born 1995)

Personal information
- Date of birth: 1 April 1995 (age 31)
- Place of birth: Serbia, FR Yugoslavia
- Height: 1.67 m (5 ft 6 in)
- Position: Defender

Team information
- Current team: KR
- Number: 21

Youth career
- Bubamara

Senior career*
Years	Team	Apps	(Gls)
- Mašinac
- Napredak
- LASK
2013–2016	Spartak Subotica	56	(10)
2016–2018	Pomurje	0	(0)
2018–	KR	37	(2)

International career^{‡}
2010–2012	Serbia U17	8	(0)
2011–2014	Serbia U19	21	(2)
2012–	Serbia	24	(2)
- * Club domestic league appearances and goals as of 28 July 2020 ‡ National team caps and goals as of 15 July 2016

Tijana Krstić (Serbian Cyrillic: Тијана Крстић; born 1 April 1995) is a Serbian footballer who plays as a defender for KR in the Besta-deild kvenna in Iceland.

== Honours ==
Spartak Subotica

- Serbian Super Liga: 2012–13, 2013–14, 2014–15, 2015–16
- Serbian Women's Cup: 2012–13, 2013–14, 2014–15, 2015–16
