= Milena Nikolić =

Bosnian association football player (born 1992)

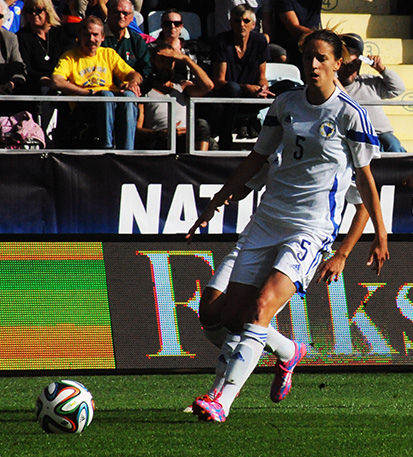

Personal information
- Date of birth: 6 July 1992 (age 34)
- Place of birth: Trebinje, Bosnia and Herzegovina
- Height: 1.87 m (6 ft 2 in)
- Position: Forward

Team information
- Current team: ZFK CSKA Moscow
- Number: 66

Youth career
- 2002–2008: ŽFK Leotar-Tex

Senior career*
Years	Team	Apps	(Gls)
2008–2009	Ekonomist		
2009–2013	Mašinac Niš		
2013–2015	Spartak Subotica	55	(82)
2016–2019	SC Sand	49	(14)
2019–2023	Bayer Leverkusen	73	(28)
2022	Bayer Leverkusen II	1	(2)
2023–2025	Basel	47	(26)
2025–	ZFK CSKA Moscow	22	(20)

International career
2010	Bosnia and Herzegovina U19	12	(2)
2012–	Bosnia and Herzegovina	101	(37)
- * Club domestic league appearances and goals

Milena Nikolić (born 6 July 1992) is a Bosnian professional footballer who currently plays as a forward for the Russian Women's Football Championship side ZFK CSKA Moscow. She is a captain of the Bosnia and Herzegovina women's national football team, for whom she played over 100 official matches and is the team's all-time best goalscorer.

== Club career ==
While playing for of ŽFK Spartak, she was the 2013–14 UEFA Women's Champions League overall top scorer, scoring 11 goals, one ahead of Martina Müller.

== Honours ==
Mašinac

- Serbian Super League (1): 2009/10
- Serbian Cup (3): 2008/09, 2009/10, 2010/11

Spartak

- Serbian Super League (2): 2013/14, 2014/15
- Serbian Cup (2): 2013/14, 2014/15

Sand

- DFB-Pokal; runner-up: 2016/17

== International goals ==
No.	Date	Venue	Opponent	Score	Result	Competition
1.	20 August 2014	Bilino Polje, Zenica, Bosnia & Herzegovina	Faroe Islands	1–0	2–0	2015 FIFA Women's World Cup qualification
2.	23 October 2015	Bosnia and Herzegovina FA Training Centre, Zenica, Bosnia & Herzegovina	Estonia	1–0	4–0	UEFA Women's Euro 2017 qualifying
3.	23 October 2015	Bosnia and Herzegovina FA Training Centre, Zenica, Bosnia & Herzegovina	Estonia	2–0	4–0	UEFA Women's Euro 2017 qualifying
4.	23 October 2015	Bosnia and Herzegovina FA Training Centre, Zenica, Bosnia & Herzegovina	Estonia	3–0	4–0	UEFA Women's Euro 2017 qualifying
5.	25 November 2015	Serbian FA Sports Centre, Stara Pazova, Serbia	Serbia	1–0	1–0	UEFA Women's Euro 2017 qualifying
6.	6 June 2016	Tamme Stadium, Tartu, Estonia	Estonia	1–0	1–0	UEFA Women's Euro 2017 qualifying
7.	20 September 2016	Bosnia and Herzegovina FA Training Centre, Zenica, Bosnia & Herzegovina	Serbia	2–4	2–4	UEFA Women's Euro 2017 qualifying
8.	31 July 2017	Bosnia and Herzegovina FA Training Centre, Zenica, Bosnia & Herzegovina	Jordan	1–0	4–2	Friendly
9.	31 July 2017	Bosnia and Herzegovina FA Training Centre, Zenica, Bosnia & Herzegovina	Jordan	3–1	4–2	Friendly
10.	3 August 2017	Bosnia and Herzegovina FA Training Centre, Zenica, Bosnia & Herzegovina	Jordan	1–0	2–2	Friendly
11.	3 August 2017	Bosnia and Herzegovina FA Training Centre, Zenica, Bosnia & Herzegovina	Jordan	2–0	2–2	Friendly
12.	21 October 2017	Astana Arena, Nur-Sultan, Kazakhstan	Kazakhstan	2–0	2–0	2019 FIFA Women's World Cup qualification
13.	30 August 2019	Bosnia and Herzegovina FA Training Centre, Zenica, Bosnia & Herzegovina	Georgia	3–0	7–1	UEFA Women's Euro 2022 qualifying
14.	30 August 2019	Bosnia and Herzegovina FA Training Centre, Zenica, Bosnia & Herzegovina	Georgia	6–0	7–1	UEFA Women's Euro 2022 qualifying
15.	3 September 2019	Koševo City Stadium, Sarajevo, Bosnia & Herzegovina	Malta	1–0	2–0	UEFA Women's Euro 2022 qualifying
16.	3 September 2019	Koševo City Stadium, Sarajevo, Bosnia & Herzegovina	Malta	2–0	2–0	UEFA Women's Euro 2022 qualifying
17.	5 March 2020	Bosnia and Herzegovina FA Training Centre, Zenica, Bosnia & Herzegovina	Israel	1–0	1–0	UEFA Women's Euro 2022 qualifying
18.	17 September 2021	Bosnia and Herzegovina FA Training Centre, Zenica, Bosnia & Herzegovina	Montenegro	2–2	2–3	2023 FIFA Women's World Cup qualification
19.	21 September 2021	Centenary Stadium, Ta'Qali, Malta	Malta	1–0	2–2	2023 FIFA Women's World Cup qualification
20.	7 April 2022	Stadion Grbavica, Sarajevo, Bosnia & Herzegovina	Azerbaijan	1–0	1–0	2023 FIFA Women's World Cup qualification
21.	12 April 2022	Camp FSCG, Podgorica, Montenegro	Montenegro	2–0	2–0	2023 FIFA Women's World Cup qualification
22.	26 September 2023	Bosnia and Herzegovina FA Training Centre, Zenica, Bosnia & Herzegovina	Slovenia	1–0	1–1	2023–24 UEFA Women's Nations League
23.	31 October 2023	Malšovická aréna, Hradec Králové, Czech Republic	Czech Republic	1–0	2–2	2023–24 UEFA Women's Nations League
24.	31 October 2023	Malšovická aréna, Hradec Králové, Czech Republic	Czech Republic	2–1	2–2	2023–24 UEFA Women's Nations League
25.	31 May 2024	Centenary Stadium, Ta'Qali, Malta	Malta	1–0	1–0	UEFA Women's Euro 2025 qualifying
26.	4 June 2024	Bosnia and Herzegovina FA Training Centre, Zenica, Bosnia & Herzegovina	Malta	1–1	2–1	UEFA Women's Euro 2025 qualifying
27.	4 June 2024	Bosnia and Herzegovina FA Training Centre, Zenica, Bosnia & Herzegovina	Malta	2–1	2–1	UEFA Women's Euro 2025 qualifying
28.	25 October 2024	Bosnia and Herzegovina FA Training Centre, Zenica, Bosnia & Herzegovina	Serbia	2–1	2–2	UEFA Women's Euro 2025 qualifying play-offs
29.	29 October 2024	Serbian FA Sports Center, Stara Pazova, Serbia	Serbia	1–1	1–4	UEFA Women's Euro 2025 qualifying play-offs
30.	26 November 2025	Bosnia and Herzegovina FA Training Centre, Zenica, Bosnia & Herzegovina	Belarus	1–2	1–2	Friendly
31.	7 March 2026	Bosnia and Herzegovina FA Training Centre, Zenica, Bosnia & Herzegovina	Liechtenstein	4–1	13–1	2027 FIFA Women's World Cup qualification
32.	7 March 2026	Bosnia and Herzegovina FA Training Centre, Zenica, Bosnia & Herzegovina	Liechtenstein	6–1	13–1	2027 FIFA Women's World Cup qualification
33.	18 April 2026	Rheinpark Stadion, Vaduz, Liechtenstein	Liechtenstein	1–0	6–0	2027 FIFA Women's World Cup qualification
34.	18 April 2026	Rheinpark Stadion, Vaduz, Liechtenstein	Liechtenstein	4–0	6–0	2027 FIFA Women's World Cup qualification
35.	18 April 2026	Rheinpark Stadion, Vaduz, Liechtenstein	Liechtenstein	5–0	6–0	2027 FIFA Women's World Cup qualification
36.	9 October 2026	DG Arena, Podgorica, Montenegro	Montenegro	1–1	2–3	Friendly

== Achievements and awards ==
Nikolić capped over 100 official matches for the Bosnia and Herzegovina women's national football team. While playing for the Swiss side Basel, she was named the best player for the 2023/24 season of the Women's Super League.

Nikolić was top scorer for the Champions League season 2013–14 with 11 goals. On 11 Aug 2014 in the 2014–15 UEFA Women's Champions League qualifying round (matchday 2), Nikolić scored a competition-record eight (8) goals in one game, in ŽFK Spartak 19–0 win against Moldavian side SS-11 Goliador-Real.
