= Marija Ilić (footballer) =

Serbian footballer (born 1993)

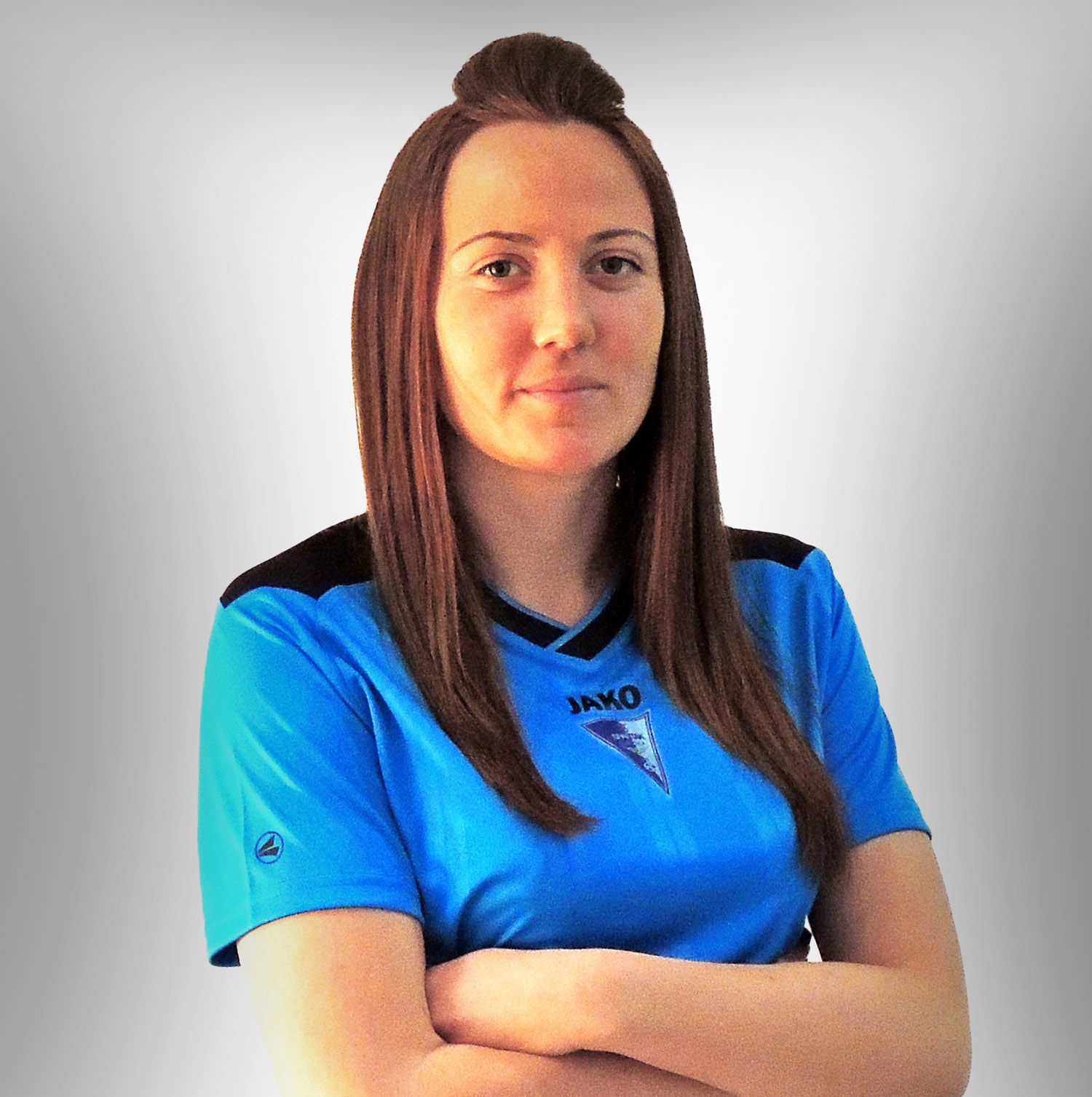

Personal information
- Full name: Marija Ilić
- Date of birth: 3 June 1993 (age 33)
- Place of birth: Smederevo, FR Yugoslavia
- Height: 1.63 m (5 ft 4 in)
- Position: Defender

Team information
- Current team: Fatih Vatan
- Number: 4

Youth career
- Jerina

Senior career*
Years	Team	Apps	(Gls)
2011–2019	Spartak Subotica		
2019–2021	BIIK Kazygurt		
2021–2022	Fatih Karagümrük	20	(6)
2022–2023	MSV Duisburg	17	(4)
2023–	Fatih Vatan	41	(1)

International career^{‡}
2010–2012	Serbia U19	15	(1)
2012–	Serbia	35	(1)
- * Club domestic league appearances and goals as of 15 December 2024 ‡ National team caps and goals as of 6 October 2024

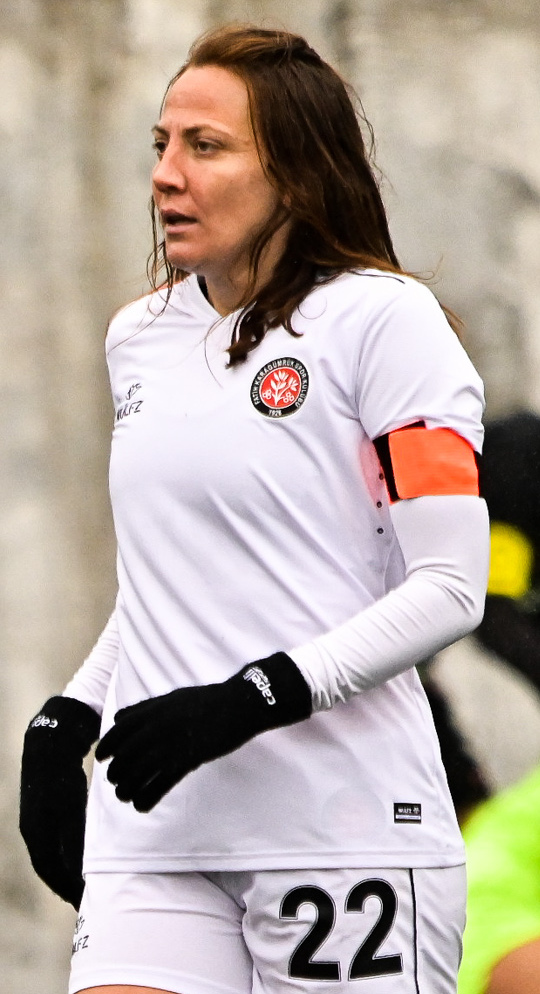
Marija Ilić of Fatih Karagümrük in the 2021–22 Turkish Super League.

Marija Ilić (Serbian Cyrillic: Марија Илић; born 3 June 1993) is a Serbian women's football defender who plays in the Turkish Super League for Fatih Vatan.

== Club career ==
In Dececember 2021, Ilić moved to Turkey and joined the newly established Istanbul club Fatih Karagümrük to play 2021–22 Women's Super League.

After one season, she transferred to the German club MSV Duisburg, where she played the 2022–23 Frauen-Bundesliga season. She scored four goals in 17 matches.

In August 2023, she went again to Turkey, and signed a deal with Fatih Vatan.

== Honours ==
Spartak Subotica

- Serbian Super Liga: Winners (5): 2010–11, 2011–12, 2012–13, 2013–14, 2014–15
- Serbian Women's Cup: Winners (4): 2011–12, 2012–13, 2013–14, 2014–15
