= Kaela Hansen =

Canadian soccer player (born 2000)

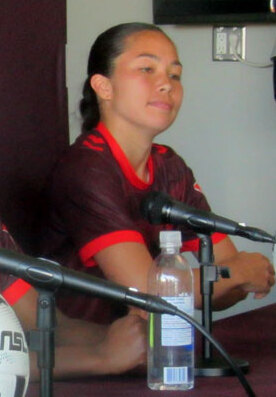
- Hansen in 2025

Personal information
- Full name: Kaela Danielle Mercado Hansen
- Date of birth: April 13, 2000 (age 26)
- Place of birth: Vancouver, British Columbia, Canada
- Height: 5 ft 7 in (1.70 m)
- Position: Defender

Team information
- Current team: Vancouver Rise FC

Youth career
- Burnaby Metro Select SC
- Cliff Avenue United SC
- Burnaby Girls SC
- Mountain United FC
- Whitecaps FC Girls Elite

College career
Years	Team	Apps	(Gls)
2018–2022	Kansas Jayhawks	98	(0)

Senior career*
Years	Team	Apps	(Gls)
2018	TSS FC Rovers		
2023	ŽFK Spartak Subotica	19	(1)
2024	KuPs	20	(0)
2025–2026	AFC Toronto	24	(1)
2026–	Vancouver Rise FC	0	(0)

International career^{‡}
2016	Canada U17	4	(0)
- * Club domestic league appearances and goals as of August 13, 2026 ‡ National team caps and goals as of September 30, 2024

Kaela Danielle Mercado Hansen (born April 13, 2000) is a Canadian professional soccer who plays for Vancouver Rise FC in the Northern Super League.

== Early life ==
Hansen began playing youth soccer at age five with Burnaby Metro Select SC. She later joined Cliff Avenue United FC, Burnaby Girls SC, and Mountain United. She then joined the Whitecaps FC Girls Elite. She was named the Whitecaps FC Youth Player of the Month for July 2016. Kaela attended Burnaby Central Secondary School.

== College career ==
In 2018, Hansen began attending the University of Kansas, where she played for the women's soccer team. In 2019, she won the Big 12 Conference title with the team. She earned Academic All-Big 12 honours four times (2018, 2020, 2021, and 2022) during her time at Kansas. Over her five seasons, she started every match for the team, finishing as the program's all-timer leader in career starts (98) and minutes played (8302).

== Club career ==
In 2018, Hansen played with TSS FC Rovers in the Women's Premier Soccer League.

In 2023, Hansen signed with ŽFK Spartak Subotica of the Serbian Women's Super League. On May 14, 2023, she scored her first pro goal in a match against ŽFK Sloga Zemun. With the club, she won the league title as well as the league cup.

In January 2024, she signed with Finnish club KuPs in the Kansallinen Liiga.

In December 2024, she signed with Northern Super League club AFC Toronto, ahead of the inaugural season in 2025. She debuted in the club's first ever match against Montreal Roses FC. On September 13, 2025, she scored her first goal, in a 7-0 victory over Vancouver Rise FC.

In August 2026, she transferred to fellow Northern Super League club Vancouver Rise FC.

== International career ==
In July 2016, Hansen was called up to the Canada U17 for the first time for a tournament in China, where she appeared in all three matches. She was later named to the squad for the 2016 FIFA U-17 Women's World Cup. She made her U17 World Cup on September 30, 2016 against Cameroon U17. She also attended camps with the Canada U20.

In February 2025, she was called up to a training camp with the Philippines national team.

== Career statistics ==
As of October 20, 2025

Appearances and goals by club, season and competition
Club	Season	League			National Cup (Note: Includes Serbian Women's Cup, Finnish Women's Cup)		Continental		Total	
Club	Season	Division	Apps	Goals	Apps	Goals	Apps	Goals	Apps	Goals
ŽFK Spartak Subotica	2022–23	Serbian SuperLiga	9	1	4	0	0	0	13	1
ŽFK Spartak Subotica	2023–24	Serbian SuperLiga	10	0	0	0	4 (Note: Appearances in UEFA Women's Champions League)	0	14	0
ŽFK Spartak Subotica	Total		19	1	4	0	4	0	27	1
KuPS	2024	Kansallinen Liiga	20	0	2	0	2	0	24	0
AFC Toronto	2025	Northern Super League	18	1	0	0	—		18	1
Career total			57	2	6	0	6	0	69	2

== Honours ==
ŽFK Spartak Subotica

- Serbian SuperLiga: 2022–23
- Serbian Women's Cup: 2022–23
