= Mirela Tenkov =

Serbian footballer (born 1990)

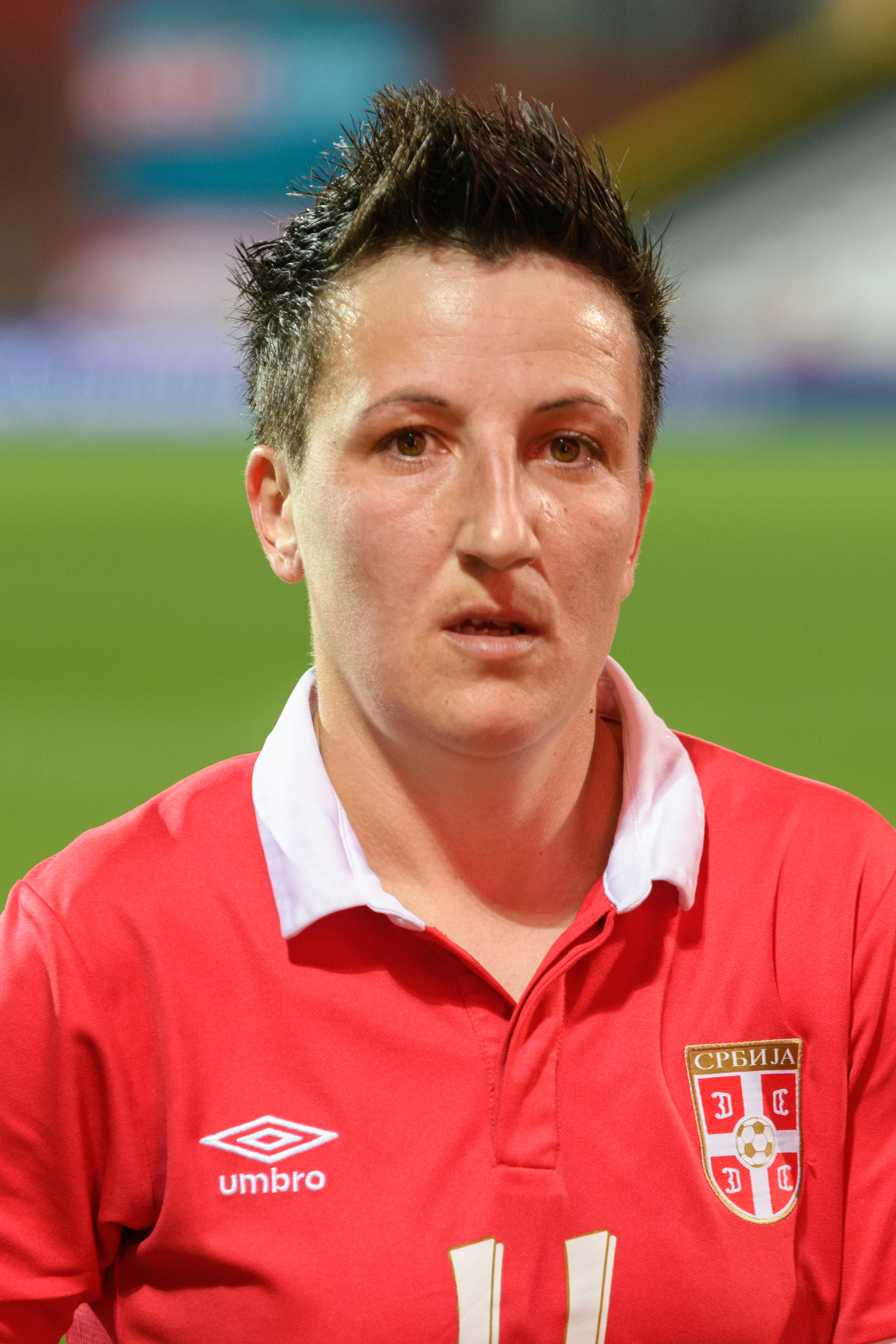

Personal information
- Full name: Mirela Tenkov
- Date of birth: 12 March 1990 (age 36)
- Place of birth: Kucura, SFR Yugoslavia
- Position: Striker

Team information
- Current team: Red Star Belgrade
- Number: 9

Senior career*
Years	Team	Apps	(Gls)
- Spartak Subotica
- Napredak Kruševac
- Red Star Belgrade

International career
2011–	Serbia	6	(0)
- * Club domestic league appearances and goals

Mirela Tenkov (Serbian Cyrillic: Мирела Тенков; born 12 March 1990) is a Serbian football striker currently playing in the Serbian Women's Super League for Red Star Belgrade. She made her Champions League debut in August 2011. One month later she made her debut for the Serbian national team in a surprise draw against England.
