= Željka Radanović =

Montenegrin footballer

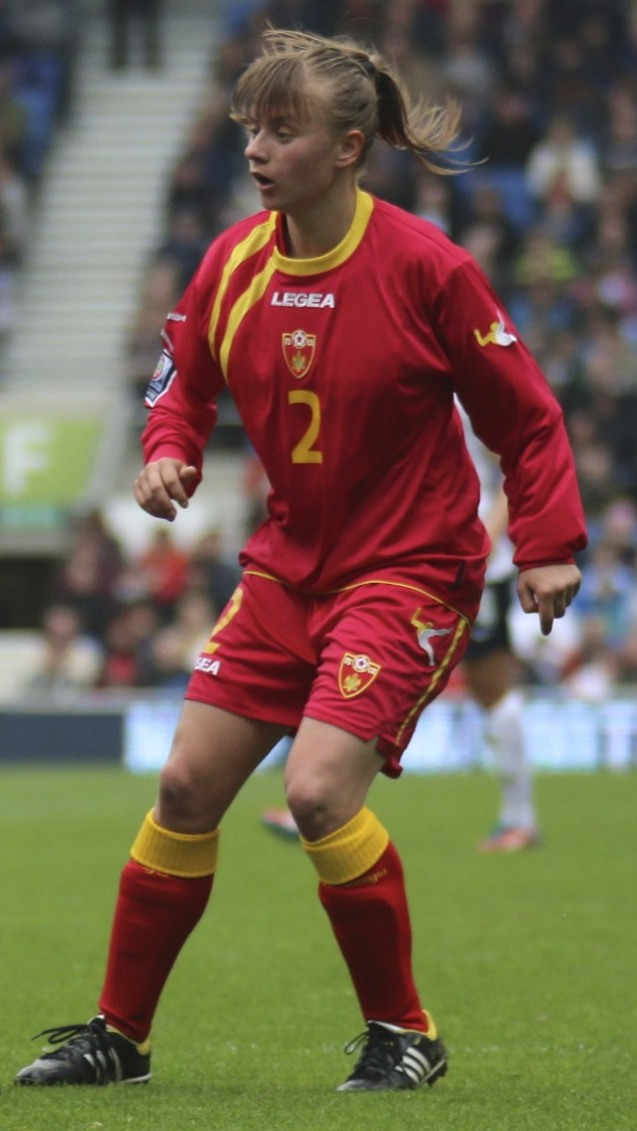

Personal information
- Full name: Željka Radanović
- Date of birth: 14 November 1989 (age 36)
- Place of birth: Bijelo Polje, SFR Yugoslavia
- Height: 1.64 m (5 ft 5 in)
- Position: Defender

Senior career*
| Years | Team | Apps | (Gls) |
- Mašinac Niš
| 2011– | Spartak Subotica | | |

International career
| 2012– | Montenegro | 29 | (0) |
- * Club domestic league appearances and goals

Željka Radanović is a Montenegrin football defender who plays for Spartak Subotica in the Serbian First League She has played the Champions League with Mašinac Niš and Spartak.
