= Marija Radojičić =

Serbian footballer (born 1992)

Personal information
- Full name: Marija Radojičić
- Date of birth: 5 May 1992 (age 34)
- Place of birth: FR Yugoslavia
- Height: 1.67 m (5 ft 6 in)
- Position: Striker

Team information
- Current team: Spartak

Senior career*
Years	Team	Apps	(Gls)
- Masinac Nis
2011–2012	Napredak Krusevac		
2012–2013	Spartak Subotica		
2013–2015	Neulengbach		
2015–2016	Valur		
2016–2017	ZFK Sloga Radnicki		
2017–2018	Spartak		
2018-	Fylkir		

International career
2011–	Serbia	7	(3)
- * Club domestic league appearances and goals

Marija Radojičić (Serbian Cyrillic: Марија Радојичић; born 5 May 1992) is a Serbian football striker currently playing for Spartak in Serbia.

In Serbia she played for Masinac Nis, Napredak Kruševac, Spartak Subotica and ZFK Sloga Radnicki. She took part in the Champions League with both Masinac and Spartak. In 2013, she signed for Austrian champion SV Neulengbach, and in 2015 she moved to Iceland's Valur. Now, she plays for Fylkir, club from Iceland. She is a member of the Serbian national team.
