= Tijana =

Tijana is a feminine given name of Croatian, Serbian and Bosnian origin, also popular in North Macedonia.

== People ==
- Tijana Ajduković (born 1991), Serbian basketball player
- Tijana Arnautović (born 1986), Serbian-Canadian model
- Tijana Bogdanović (born 1998), Serbian taekwondo athlete
- Tijana Bogićević (born 1981), Serbian singer
- Tijana Bošković (born 1997), Serbian volleyball player
- Tijana Filipović (born 1999), Serbian footballer
- Tijana Malešević (born 1991), Serbian volleyball player
- Tijana Matić (born 1996), Serbian footballer
- Tijana Milojević (born 1998), Serbian volleyball player
- Tijana Todevska-Dapčević (born 1976), Macedonian-Serbian pop singer
