= Christina Sampanidis =

Serbian footballer (born 1988)

Personal information
- Full name: Hristina Sampanidou
- Date of birth: 5 December 1988 (age 37)
- Place of birth: Remscheid, West Germany
- Height: 1.64 m (5 ft 4 1/2 in)
- Position: Defender

Team information
- Current team: ŽFK Mašinac
- Number: 3

Youth career
- 1997–2001: TuRa Wermelskirchen
- 2001–2004: TG Hilgen 04

Senior career*
Years	Team	Apps	(Gls)
2004–2007	PAOK	67	(2)
2007–2010	ŽFK Mašinac	74	(3)
2010	Bayer 04 Leverkusen	0	(0)
2010–	ŽFK Mašinac	15	(0)

International career
2005–2007	Serbia U-19	17	(0)
2007–	Serbia	12	(0)
- * Club domestic league appearances and goals

Christina Sampanidis (Serbian Cyrillic: Кристина Сампанидис; born 12 May 1988) is a Serbian female footballer currently playing for ŽFK Mašinac PZP Niš. She represents the Serbia national team, the country of her mother.

== Career ==
Sampanidis began her career with nine years in the youth side for TuRa Wermelskirchen and joined 2001 to TG Hilgen 04. After three years with TG Hilgen 04 signed in July 2004 for his fathers former club PAOK. She won in three years for PAOK two national championships and moved than to the land of her mother Serbia who signed for ŽFK Mašinac PZP Niš. He played for ŽFK Mašinac 74 games and scored 3 goals in three years, before returning to Germany to sign for Bayer 04 Leverkusen. Without having played a Bundesliga match, on 5 October 2010 resigned her contract with Bayer 04 Leverkusen and returned to ŽFK Mašinac.

== International career ==
She is former Serbia U-19 and since 2007 regular starter for the Serbia women's national football team.

== Personal life ==
Her father Dimitris, a Greek, is a former professional player of PAOK, while her mother Suzana comes from Serbia.
