= Jelena Čanković =

Serbian footballer (born 1995)

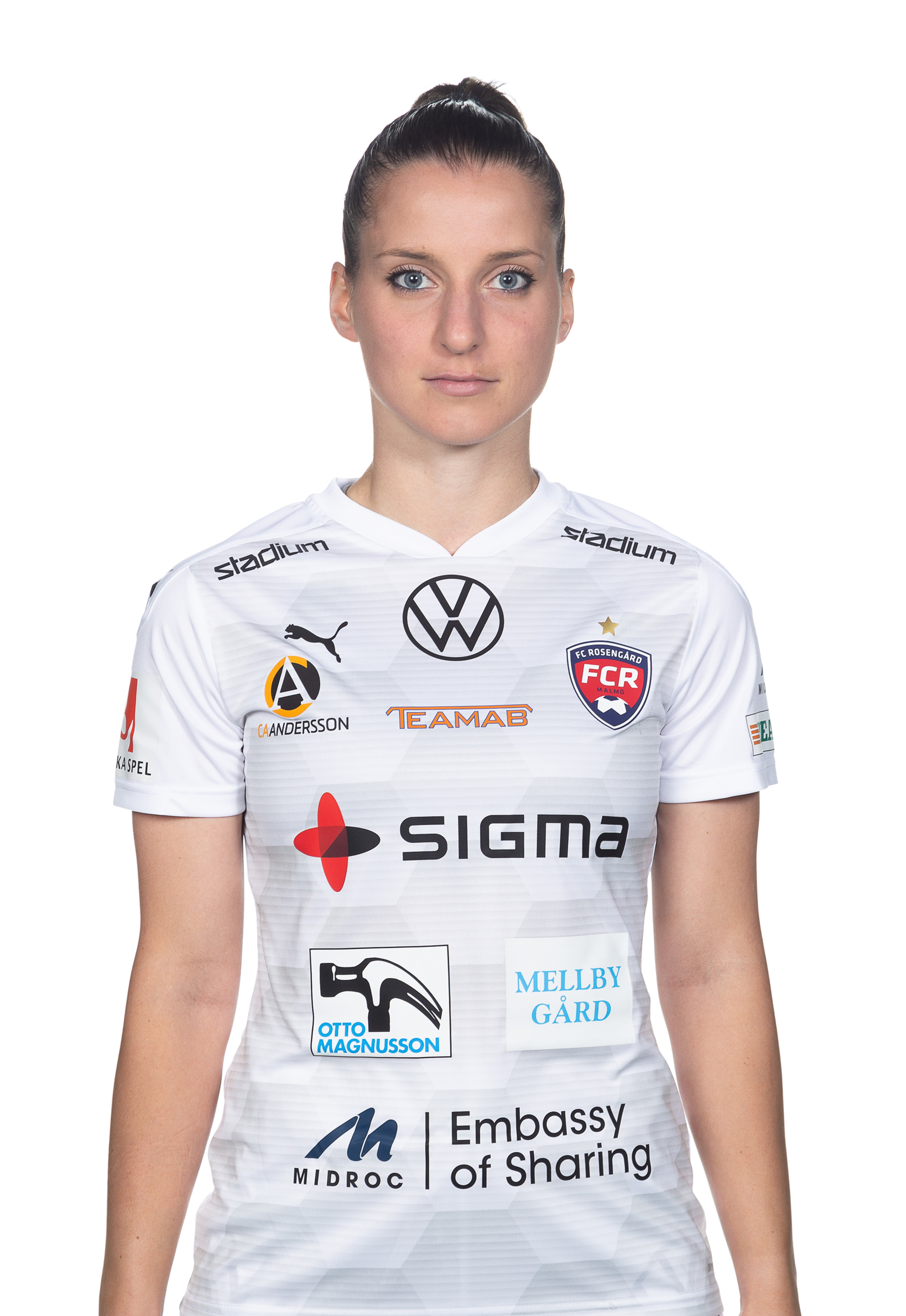
- Čanković with FC Rosengård in 2020

Personal information
- Date of birth: 13 August 1995 (age 31)
- Place of birth: Batajnica, FR Yugoslavia (now Serbia)
- Height: 1.62 m (5 ft 4 in)
- Position: Midfielder

Team information
- Current team: Brighton & Hove Albion
- Number: 10

Youth career
- 2001–2011: FK Perspektiva

Senior career*
Years	Team	Apps	(Gls)
2011–2013	Spartak Subotica	50	(35)
2013–2014	Barcelona	20	(5)
2014–2015	Spartak Subotica	11	(1)
2015–2017	Ferencváros	40	(3)
2017–2019	Växjö	30	(4)
2019–2022	FC Rosengård	62	(19)
2022–2024	Chelsea	23	(4)
2024–	Brighton & Hove Albion	37	(5)

International career^{‡}
2010–2013	Serbia U17		
2011–2014	Serbia U19	17	(3)
2013–2026	Serbia	47	(6)
- * Club domestic league appearances and goals as of 24 October 2026 ‡ National team caps and goals as of 5 July 2026

Jelena Čanković (Serbian Cyrillic: Јелена Чанковић, IPA: [jělena ˈtʃaːŋkovitɕ]; born 13 August 1995) is a Serbian professional footballer who plays as a midfielder for Women's Super League club Brighton & Hove Albion and the Serbia national team. She previously played for FC Rosengård of the Swedish Damallsvenskan.

== Club career ==
Čanković joined FC Barcelona in August 2013 from Spartak Subotica. In September 2013, Čanković made her debut for the senior Serbia national team. She played for Ferencvárosi TC before she signed for Växjö DFF. In 2016 Čanković was chosen as Player of the year in the Hungarian Jet-Sol Liga. In 2018 she provided the most assists in Damallsvenkan and was named one of three nominees for Best Midfielder, selected from Swedish national team players and Damallsvenskan players.

On 26 August 2022, Chelsea announced that they had sign Čanković on a three-year deal. On 23 August 2024, she signed for fellow WSL club Brighton & Hove Albion.

== Personal life ==
The footballer Jovana Damnjanović is Čanković's first cousin.

== Career statistics ==
=== Brighton & Hove Albion ===
As of match played 24 October 2026

Season	League			FA Cup		League Cup		Total	
Season	Division	Apps	Goals	Apps	Goals	Apps	Goals	Apps	Goals
2024–25	Women's Super League	15	3	2	0	4	0	21	3
2025–26	Women's Super League	17	2	5	1	1	0	23	3
2026–27	Women's Super League	5	0	0	0	2	0	7	0
Total		37	5	7	1	7	0	51	6

=== International goals ===
No.	Date	Venue	Opponent	Score	Result	Competition
1.	14 June 2021	Szent Gellért Fórum, Szeged, Hungary	Hungary	2–1	3–2	Friendly
2.	23 February 2022	Gürsel Aksel Stadium, İzmir, Turkey	Turkey	4–2	5–2	2023 FIFA Women's World Cup qualification
3.	22 September 2023	Stadion Miejski im. Kazimierza Deyny, Starogard Gdański, Poland	Ukraine	1–1	2–1	2023–24 UEFA Women's Nations League

== Honours ==
Spartak Subotica

- Serbian Super Liga: 2010–11, 2011–12, 2012–13, 2014–15
- Serbian Women's Cup: 2011–12, 2012–13

Barcelona

- Primera División: 2013–14

Ferencváros

- Női NB I: 2014–15, 2015–16
- Hungarian Women's Cup: 2014–15, 2015–16, 2016–17

Växjö

- Elitettan: 2017

FC Rosengård

- Damallsvenskan: 2019, 2021
- Svenska Cupen: 2021–22

Chelsea

- FA Women's Super League: 2022–23, 2023–24
- Women's FA Cup: 2022–23

Individual

- Női NB I Player of the year: 2016
- Brighton & Hove Albion Goal of the Season: 2024-25
