= Tijana Matić =

Serbian footballer (born 1996)

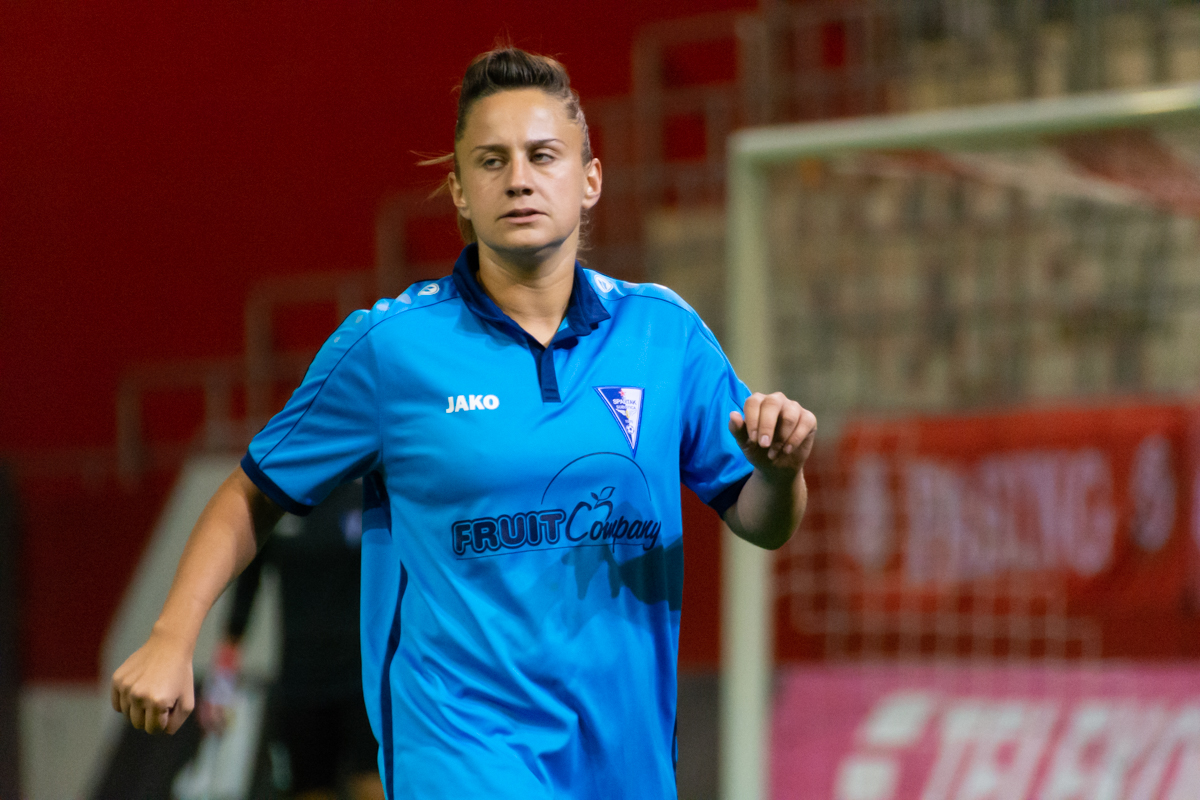

Personal information
- Full name: Tijana Matić
- Date of birth: 22 February 1996 (age 30)
- Place of birth: Pančevo, Serbia, FR Yugoslavia
- Height: 1.60 m (5 ft 3 in)
- Position: Midfielder

Team information
- Current team: Ryazan-VDV

Senior career*
Years	Team	Apps	(Gls)
2015–2021	ŽFK Spartak Subotica	103	(56)
2021–	Ryazan-VDV	4	(0)

International career^{‡}
2018–	Serbia	12	(1)
- * Club domestic league appearances and goals as of 19:10, 30 August 2019 (UTC) ‡ National team caps and goals as of 10 April 2023

Tijana Matić (Serbian Cyrillic: Тијана Матић; born 22 February 1996) is a Serbian footballer who plays as a midfielder for Russian Top Division club Ryazan-VDV and has appeared for the Serbia women's national team.

== Career ==
Matić has been capped for the Serbia national team, appearing for the team during the 2019 FIFA Women's World Cup qualifying cycle.

== International goals ==
No.	Date	Venue	Opponent	Score	Result	Competition
1.	1 September 2019	Kazhymukan Munaitpasov Stadium, Shymkent, Kazakhstan	Kazakhstan	3–0	3–0	UEFA Women's Euro 2022 qualifying
