= Clare Pleuler =

American soccer player

Personal information
- Full name: Clare Murphy Pleuler
- Date of birth: December 20, 1993 (age 32)
- Place of birth: Gloucester, Massachusetts, U.S.
- Position: Defender

College career
| Years | Team | Apps | (Gls) |
| 2012–2015 | Boston University Terriers | 79 | (11) |

Senior career*
| Years | Team | Apps | (Gls) |
| 2016 | Hovås Billdal | 10 | (0) |
| 2017–2019 | Spartak Subotica | | |
| 2019 | Ramat HaSharon | | |
| 2019 | Sparta Prague | | |
| 2019–2021 | Granadilla | 39 | (6) |
| 2021–2022 | Real Sociedad | 11 | (0) |
- * Club domestic league appearances and goals as of 11:48, October 12, 2021 (UTC)

Clare Murphy Pleuler (born December 20, 1993) is an American former professional soccer player who played as a defender for Real Sociedad.

== College career ==
Pleuler started her career at Boston University Terriers.
