= Angelina Hix =

American soccer player

Personal information
- Full name: Angelina Nicole Hix
- Date of birth: July 27, 1993 (age 33)
- Place of birth: Irvine, California, U.S.
- Height: 5 ft 10 in (1.78 m)
- Position: Winger

Team information
- Current team: UNAM
- Number: 12

College career
Years	Team	Apps	(Gls)
2011–2013	MiraCosta Spartans		(52)

Senior career*
Years	Team	Apps	(Gls)
2015	San Diego WFC SeaLions		
2016	Tijuana Xolos USA		
2017	San Diego WFC SeaLions		
2018	LA Galaxy OC		
2018	Spartak Subotica		
2021	Santiago Morning		
2021–2024	Tijuana	51	(17)
2025–	UNAM	21	(8)
- * Club domestic league appearances and goals as of January 31, 2026

Angelina Nicole Hix (born July 27, 1993) is an American soccer player who plays as a forward for Liga MX Femenil side UNAM.

== College career ==
Hix played soccer for the MiraCosta Spartans in 2011 and 2013, recording 52 goals and 27 assists and serving as team captain in her second season. She also played basketball for the school in the 2011–12 and 2012–13 seasons. Hix was scouted by scouted by several universities for soccer, and was offered multiple scholarships in soccer and basketball to play in college. She was offered a full athletic scholarship to play for the Cal State Dominguez Hills Toros, but ultimately did not join the team.

== Club career ==
Hix played for the San Diego WFC SeaLions in 2015 and 2017, while playing for Tijuana Xolos USA in 2016. She played for LA Galaxy OC of United Women's Soccer in 2018. In mid 2018, Hix signed for Serbian side Spartak Subotica, but tore her ACL, MCL, and meniscus during a match in October 2018. Before the 2021 season, she signed for Santiago Morning in Chile. In 2021, she signed for Mexican club Tijuana.

== Personal life ==
Hix was born in Irvine, California, and grew up in nearby Huntington Beach. She competed in surfing contests in her youth, and was sponsored by a surf shop. As a result, she was homeschooled for a few years to allow her to finish schoolwork early and go surfing daily. She was a graduate of Dehesa Charter School.
