= Dorine Chuigoué =

Equatoguinean footballer (born 1988)

Personal information
- Full name: Dorine Nina Chuigoué
- Date of birth: 28 November 1988 (age 37)
- Place of birth: Yaoundé, Cameroon
- Height: 1.70 m (5 ft 7 in)
- Position: Centre-back

Team information
- Current team: Hapoel Jerusalem

Youth career
- Tonnerre Yaoundé

Senior career*
Years	Team	Apps	(Gls)
2005	Tonnerre Yaoundé		
2006–2010	Águilas Verdes		
2010–2011	Estrellas de E'Waiso Ipola		
2011–2012	Spartak Subotica		
2012–2017	Estrellas de E'Waiso Ipola		
2017–2018	Spartak Subotica		
2018–2020	Logroño	42	(3)
2020–2025	Betis	127	(6)
2025–	Hapoel Jerusalem	25	(2)

International career
2006–	Equatorial Guinea		
Medal record
Women's football
Representing Equatorial Guinea
Women's Africa Cup of Nations
First place	2008 Equatorial Guinea
Second place	2010 South Africa
First place	2012 Equatorial Guinea
- * Club domestic league appearances and goals as of 26 August 2026

Dorine Nina Chuigoué (born 28 November 1988) is a professional footballer who plays as a centre-back for Ligat Nashim club Hapoel Jerusalem.

Born and raised in Cameroon to Cameroonian parents, Chuigoué has played in the Equatorial Guinean women's league and subsequently capped for the Equatorial Guinea women's national team.

== Early life ==
Born and raised in Cameroon into a Cameroonian family, Chuigoué was the only female of five siblings. Living in a mostly male environment, she behaved like a man. During her childhood, she played football, tennis and basketball in her neighborhood. Then, her parents signed her to practice karate. She ultimately opted to pursue a career as a footballer.

== Club career ==
After being left in the Stade Omnisports by her brother and father, Chuigoué started her career with Tonnerre Yaoundé. She played originally as a forward, becoming at the time the best scorer in the Cameroonian league. She had then had an offer to play in Singapore, but had to reject it due to her mother's opposition.

In 2006, Chuigoué moved to Equatoguinean women's league club Águilas Verdes FC. In June 2010, she joined Estrellas de E'Waiso Ipola.

After playing the 2011 FIFA Women's World Cup for the Equatorial Guinea national team, Chuigoué signed for Serbian women's league club Spartak Subotica. She lasted one season there. In mid-2012, she came back to the Equatoguinean league and returned to Estrellas de E'Waiso Ipola, where she played until 2017.

On 3 August 2017, Chuigoué rejoined by Serbian club Spartak Subotica. Next season, she moved to Spanish women's top league club EDF Logroño, playing along with her Equatorial Guinean teammate Jade Boho.

On 15 July 2025, Chuigoué signed for Hapoel Jerusalem. On her first season with the club, Chuigoué won the Ligat Al championship for the first time in the club's history, while helping the team's defence concede only 18 goals in 27 games.

== International career ==
Chuigoué just wanted to play for Cameroon, but was not called up despite her impressive performances at Tonnerre Yaoundé. In 2006, she became a naturalised citizen of Equatorial Guinea. She debuted with the women's national team of that country during the 2006 African Women's Championship. She played in the 2011 World Cup.
