= Violeta Slović =

Serbian footballer (born 1991)

Personal information
- Full name: Violeta Slović
- Date of birth: 30 August 1991 (age 35)
- Place of birth: Kragujevac, SFR Yugoslavia
- Height: 1.80 m (5 ft 11 in)
- Position: Defender

Team information
- Current team: Spartak Subotica
- Number: 5

Youth career
- Sušica (Kragujevac)

Senior career*
Years	Team	Apps	(Gls)
2010–	Spartak Subotica	28	(11)

International career^{‡}
2009–	Serbia	111	(7)
- * Club domestic league appearances and goals ‡ National team caps and goals as of 27 October 2025 (UTC)

Violeta Slović (Serbian Cyrillic: Виолета Словић; born 30 August 1991) is a Serbian football defender currently playing for in the Serbian First League for ZFK Spartak Subotica, with which she made her Champions League debut in August 2011. In the next edition she scored the winning goal over Pärnu JK that marked Spartak's qualification to the Round of 32 for the first time. She is a member of the Serbia national team. On 29 October 2024, she made her 100th international appearance in a 4–1 win over Bosnia and Herzegovina during the Euro 2025 qualifying play-offs, becoming the first Serbian player to achieve this feat.

== Honours ==
Spartak Subotica

Winner

- Serbian Super Liga (5): 2010–11, 2011–12, 2012–13, 2013–14, 2014–15
- Serbian Women's Cup (4): 2011–12, 2012–13, 2013–14, 2014–15

== International goals ==
No.	Date	Venue	Opponent	Score	Result	Competition
1.	16 June 2012	Gradski stadion, Vrbovec, Croatia	Croatia	2–0	4–1	UEFA Women's Euro 2013 qualifying
2.	20 September 2016	Bosnia and Herzegovina FA Training Centre, Zenica, Bosnia and Herzegovina	Bosnia and Herzegovina	1–0	4–2	UEFA Women's Euro 2017 qualifying
3.	26 February 2019	Igralište Lučkog, Zagreb, Croatia	Montenegro	1–0	4–0	2019 Istria Cup
4.	14 June 2019	Serbian FA Sports Center, Stara Pazova, Serbia	Switzerland	1–0	1–1	Friendly
5.	11 April 2023	Serbian FA Sports Center, Stara Pazova, Serbia	South Africa	1–0	3–2	Friendly
6.	31 May 2024	Čukarički Stadium, Belgrade, Serbia	Slovakia	1–1	2–1	UEFA Women's Euro 2025 qualifying
