= Jelena Čubrilo =

Serbian footballer (born 1994)

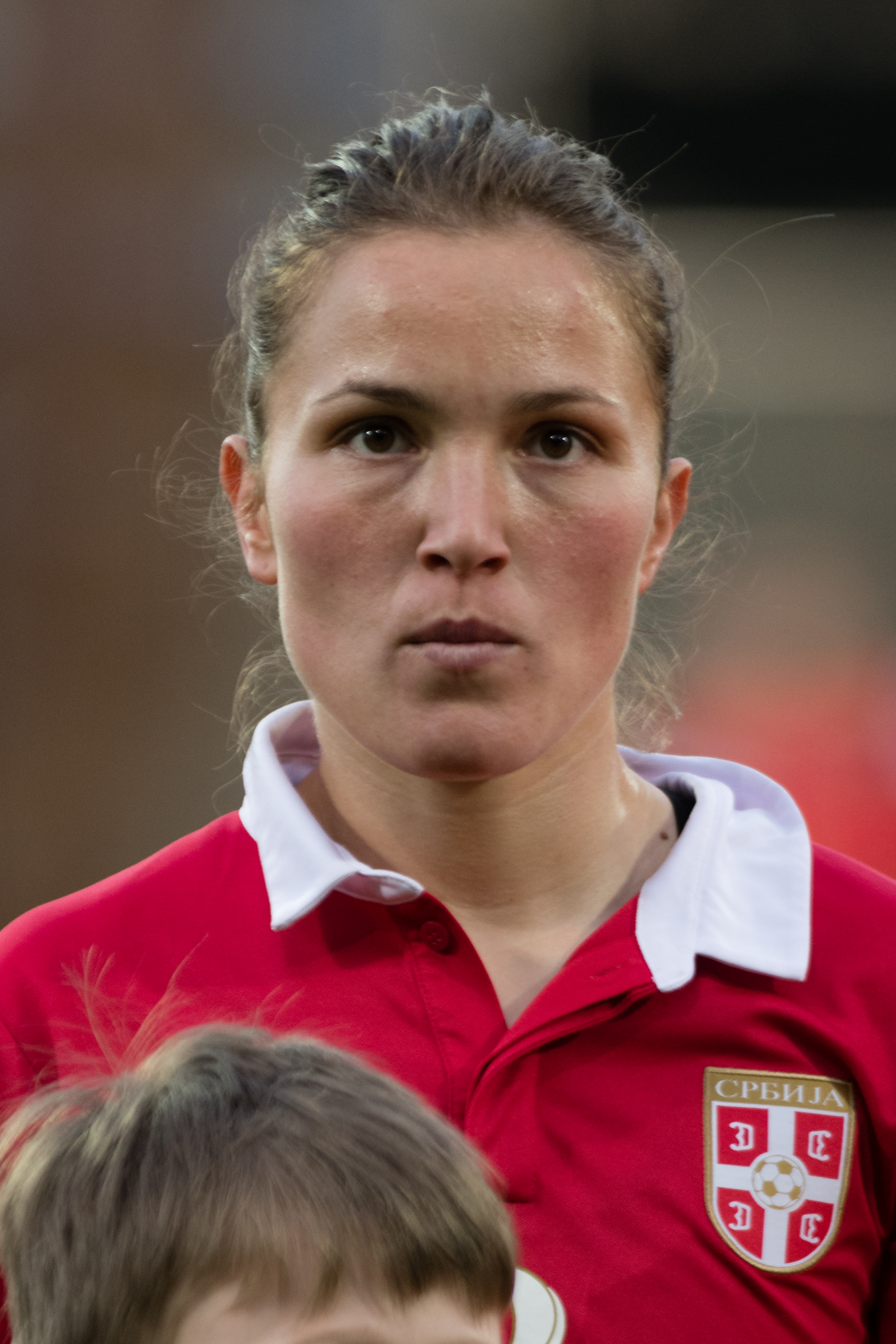

Personal information
- Full name: Jelena Čubrilo
- Date of birth: 9 January 1994 (age 32)
- Place of birth: Belgrade, FR Yugoslavia
- Height: 1.62 m (5 ft 4 in)
- Position: Midfielder

Senior career*
| Years | Team | Apps | (Gls) |
| 2006–2010 | LASK Lazarevac | | |
| 2010–2014 | Spartak Subotica | | |
| 2014 | Amazones Dramas | | |
| 2015 | Osijek | | |
| 2017–2018 | Gintra Universitetas | | |
| 2018–2019 | Rayo Vallecano | 3 | (0) |
| 2019–2020 | Alhama | 11 | (2) |
| 2020–2021 | Gintra | 17 | (25) |
| 2023 | Fatih Vatan Spor | 22 | (4) |

International career
| 2010 | Serbia U17 | 9 | (3) |
| 2010–2013 | Serbia U19 | 14 | (4) |
| 2013– | Serbia | 6 | (1) |
- * Club domestic league appearances and goals as of 5 23 December 2023

Jelena Čubrilo (Serbian Cyrillic: Јелена Чубрило; born 9 January 1994) is a Serbian footballer, who plays as a forward for Turkish Women's Super League club Fatih Vatan Spor and the Serbia women's national team.

== Club career ==
Čubrilo has played for Spartak Subotica, with whom she has played the Champions League.

Jelena in 2020 returned to Gintra Universitetas and play for Lithuanian champions in Lithuanian A lyga; scored 25 goals in 17 matches.

In January 2023, she moved to Turkey and signed with Fatih Vatan Spor to play in the second half of the 2022–23 Super League.

== International career ==
Čubrilo was an under-19 international for Serbia.
