= Evy á Lakjuni =

Faroese footballer

Personal information
- Full name: Evy á Lakjuni
- Date of birth: August 12, 1999 (age 27)
- Position: Midfielder

Team information
- Current team: KÍ

Senior career*
Years	Team	Apps	(Gls)
2014–	KÍ	101	(58)

International career^{‡}
2014–2015	Faroe Islands U17	6	(0)
2016–2017	Faroe Islands U19	6	(1)
2018–	Faroe Islands	6	(0)
- * Club domestic league appearances and goals as of 18 September 2021 ‡ National team caps and goals as of 18 September 2021

Evy á Lakjuni (born 12 August 1999) is a Faroese football midfielder who currently plays for KÍ and the Faroe Islands women's national football team.

== Honours ==
KÍ

- 1. deild kvinnur: 2014, 2015, 2016, 2019, 2020
- Steypakappingin kvinnur: 2014, 2015, 2016, 2020
