= Sara Pavlović =

Serbian footballer (born 1996)

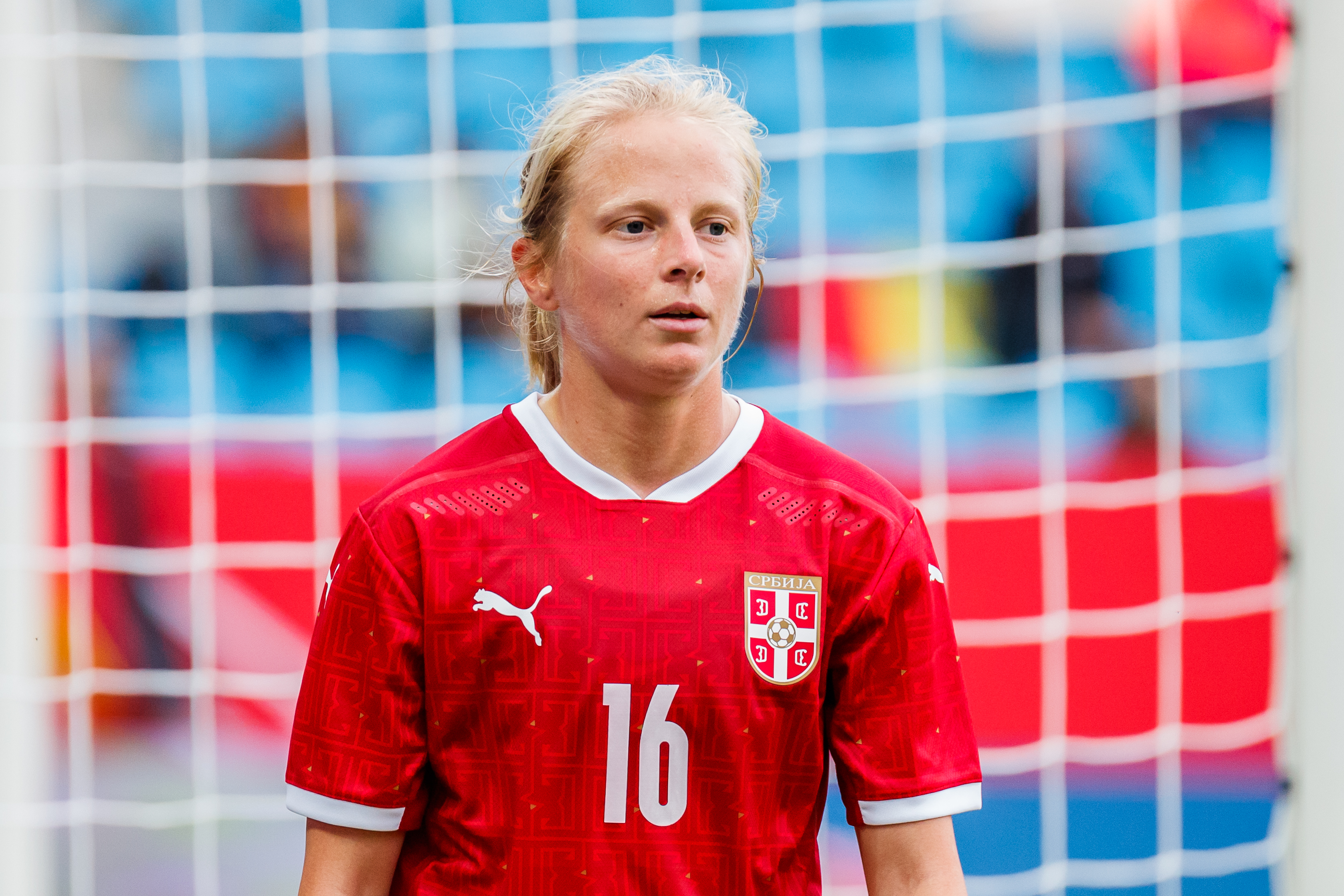
- Sara Pavlović with Serbia national team in 2021

Personal information
- Date of birth: 10 May 1996 (age 30)
- Place of birth: Čačak, Serbia, FR Yugoslavia
- Height: 1.61 m (5 ft 3 1/2 in)
- Position: Midfielder

Team information
- Current team: SK Sturm Graz
- Number: 21

Senior career*
Years	Team	Apps	(Gls)
–2020	Spartak		
2021–2022	Avaldsnes IL	43	(1)
2023	Spartak	9	(3)
2023–2024	Famalicão	17	(0)
2024	UD Tenerife	10	(0)
2025–2026	FK Austria Wien	33	(0)
2026-	SK Sturm Graz	0	(0)

International career^{‡}
	Serbia	19	(0)
- * Club domestic league appearances and goals as of 19:10, 30 August 2019 (UTC) ‡ National team caps and goals as of 20:22, 31 October 2023 (UTC)

Sara Pavlović (Serbian Cyrillic: Сара Павловић; born 10 May 1996) is a Serbian footballer who plays as a midfielder for ÖFB Frauen Bundesliga side SK Sturm Graz and has appeared for the Serbia women's national team.

== Career ==
Pavlović has been capped for the Serbia national team, appearing for the team during the 2019 FIFA Women's World Cup qualifying cycle.

== Honours ==
- ÖFB Frauen-Bundesliga 2025/26
- ÖFB Frauen Cup 2025/26
