= ŽFK Sloga Zemun =

ŽFK Partizan Sloga
- Full name: Ženski fudbalski klub Partizan Sloga
- Founded: 15 June 1969
- Ground: Sports complex Radnički Belgrade, Novi Beograd
- Capacity: 5,000
- League: Serbian Super Liga
- 2022–23: 4th
Home colours	Away colours

ŽFK Partizan Sloga is a Serbian women's football club from the city of Zemun. It was founded in 1969 and is the oldest women's football club in Serbia. It currently competes in the highest level of Serbian women's football championship, known as Prva ženska liga. The team has won the championship three times and the women's cup five times, making it the second most successful women's club behind Mašinac Niš. In 2025, the club was absorbed by FK Partizan and will compete under the name ŽFK Partizan-Sloga.

== Titles ==
- National Championship (3)
  - Champion of Yugoslavia: 1978–79, 1979–80
  - Champion of Serbia and Montenegro : 1993–94
- National Cup (5)
  - Cup of Yugoslavia: 1978–79, 1980–81, 1984–85
  - Cup of Serbia and Montenegro : 1992–93, 1993–94
