= Simona Krstanovska =

Macedonian footballer

Personal information
- Date of birth: 10 August 1997 (age 29)
- Position: Midfielder

Team information
- Current team: Breznica
- Number: 21

Senior career*
Years	Team	Apps	(Gls)
–201?	Kočani		
201?–2018	Spartak Subotica		
2018–2019	Olimpija Ljubljana		
2019–	Breznica		

International career^{‡}
2012–2013	Macedonia U17	6	(0)
2014	Macedonia U19	3	(1)
2014–	North Macedonia	8	(1)
- * Club domestic league appearances and goals ‡ National team caps and goals as of 3 September 2019

Simona Krstanovska (born 10 August 1997) is a Macedonian footballer who plays as a midfielder for Montenegrin 1. ŽFL club ŽFK Breznica and the North Macedonia women's national team.

== International goals ==
Scores and results list Macedonia's goal tally first

No.	Date	Venue	Opponent	Score	Result	Competition
1	15 September 2016	FC Minsk Stadium, Minsk, Belarus	Belarus	2–5	2–6	UEFA Women's Euro 2017 qualifying Group 1
