= ŽFK Spartak Subotica =

- Full name: Ženski fudbalski klub Spartak Subotica
- Nickname: Plave golubice (Blue Doves)
- Founded: 20 May 1970; 55 years ago
- Chairman: (Serbia) Zoran Arsić
- Manager: (Serbia) Bojan Arsić
- Coach: (Serbia) Boris Arsić
- League: SuperLiga
- 2024–25: 2nd
- Website: http://www.zfk-spartak.in.rs/
Home colours	Away colours	Third colours

ŽFK Spartak Subotica (Serbian Cyrillic: ЖФК Спартак Суботица) is women's football team from Subotica, Serbia. The team has won ten national championships, including nine in a row from 2011 to 2019. It also has appeared in the UEFA Women's Champions League.

== History ==
In May 1970 employees of the railway company Željezničar established a women's football club of the same name in Subotica, which became a member of the sports association Jovan Mikic Spartak. ŽFK Željezničar won the first Yugoslavia women's football league in 1975. The team was later renamed Spartak, and following the break-up of Yugoslavia it played the Serbian League.

In 2011, forty years after the club's creation, Spartak won its second championship, and in the next two seasons it won both the championship and the national cup. The team couldn't make it past the qualifying round in its UEFA Champions League debut, but in its two following appearances it reached the Round of 32.

== Titles ==
- 1 Yugoslav League: 1974–75
- 13 Serbian Leagues: 2010–11, 2011–12, 2012–13, 2013–14, 2014–15, 2015–16, 2016–17, 2017–18, 2018–19, 2019–20, 2020–21, 2021–22, 2022-23
- 10 Serbian Cups: 2011–12, 2012–13, 2013–14, 2014–15, 2015–16, 2016–17, 2018–19, 2020-21, 2021-22, 2022-23

== Current squad ==
- As of September 2023 according to UEFA's website.
- Flags indicate national team as defined under FIFA eligibility rules. Players may hold more than one non-FIFA nationality.

Note: Flags indicate national team as defined under FIFA eligibility rules; some limited exceptions apply. Players may hold more than one non-FIFA nationality.

No.	Pos.	Nation	Player
1	GK	SRB	Jefimija Škandro
2	DF	SRB	Alina Baka
3	DF	SRB	Isidora Vučković
4	FW	SRB	Željka Belovan
5	DF	SRB	Violeta Slović
6	DF	USA	Makenzie Langdok
7	MF	USA	Abigail Ostrem
8	MF	CAN	Kaela Hansen
9	FW	BRA	Kamile Martins
10	MF	SRB	Tijana Filipović
11	FW	GHA	Doris Boaduwaa

No.	Pos.	Nation	Player
12	GK	SRB	Dajana Mihajlović
13	DF	SRB	Milica Gaković
14	DF	SRB	Biljana Ilić
15	DF	SRB	Aleksandra Gajić
16	FW	SRB	Milica Šarić
17	FW	SRB	Anđela Marković
18	MF	SRB	Živana Stupar
19	FW	SRB	Nađa Uvalin
20	FW	SRB	Anastasija Ćirić
21	MF	SRB	Elena Cvetković
30	GK	SRB	Iris Ungur

=== Former internationals ===
For details of current and former players, see Category:ŽFK Spartak Subotica players.

- Serbia: Jelena Čanković, Jelena Čubrilo, Nevena Damjanović, Liljana Gordijan, Marija Ilić, Ana Ivanova, Tijana Krstić, Vesna Milivojević, Nikoleta Nikolić, Allegra Poljak, Marija Radojičić, Aleksandra Savanović, Ana Stojanović, Mirela Tenkov
- Bosnia and Herzegovina: Amela Fetahović, Milena Nikolić
- Cameroon: Gaëlle Enganamouit, Adrienne Iven, Jeannette Yango, Claudine Meffometou
- Chinese Taipei: Tseng Shu-o
- Equatorial Guinea: Dorine Chuigoué
- Ghana: Elizabeth Addo, Priscilla Okyere
- Ivory Coast: Josée Nahi, Ines Nrehy
- Montenegro: Željka Radanović
- North Macedonia: Eli Jakovska, Simona Krstanovska, Aleksandra Markovska
- Russia: Yekaterina Gokhman

== UEFA Competitions Record ==
In their first European season the team finished second and failed to qualify for the knock-out stage. In their next season they too finished second but moved on to the round of 32 as one of the two best second-placed teams.

Season	Competition	Stage	Result	Opponent	Scorers
2011-12	Champions League	Qualifying round	0–4	(Scotland) Glasgow City	—
2011-12	Champions League	Qualifying round	4–2	(Faroe Islands) KÍ	Damjanović (2), Čubrilo (1), Ilić (1)
2011-12	Champions League	Qualifying round	11–0	(Malta) Mosta FC	Čubrilo (5), Damjanović (4), Čanković (1), Jovanović (1)
2012-13	Champions League	Qualifying round	7–0	(Bulgaria) NSA Sofia	Radojičić (2), Tenkov (2), Čanković (1), Ilić (1), +1 o.g.
2012-13	Champions League	Qualifying round	0–2	(Kazakhstan) BIIK Kazygurt	—
2012-13	Champions League	Qualifying round	1–0	(Estonia) Pärnu JK	Slović (1)
2012-13	Champions League	Round of 32	0–1	(Sweden) Göteborg FC	—
2012-13	Champions League	Round of 32	0–3	(Sweden) Göteborg FC	—
2013-14	Champions League	Qualifying round	10–0	(Latvia) Liepājas Metalurgs	Nikolić (3), Adamov (2), Čubrilo (2), Nahi (2), Nrehy (1)
2013-14	Champions League	Qualifying round	6–0	(Lithuania) Gintra Universitetas	Nikolić (3), Čubrilo (2), Slović (1)
2013-14	Champions League	Qualifying round	8–3	(Romania) Olimpia Cluj	Nikolić (4), Čubrilo (3), Nahi (1)
2013-14	Champions League	Round of 32	2–4	(Russia) FK Rossiyanka	Meffometou (1), Nahi (1)
2013-14	Champions League	Round of 32	1–1	(Russia) FK Rossiyanka	Nikolić (1)
2014-15	Champions League	Qualifying round	3–0	(Greece) Amazones Dramas	Marenić (1), Nikolić (1), Slović (1)
2014-15	Champions League	Qualifying round	19–0	(Moldova) Goliador-Real	Nikolić (8), Nrehy (3), Slović (3), Čanković (1), Ilić (1), Marenić (1), Radanović (1), +1 o.g.
2014-15	Champions League	Qualifying round	0–1	(Croatia) ŽNK Osijek	—
2015-16	Champions League	Qualifying round	2–1	(Portugal) CF Benfica	Filipović (1), Matić (1)
2015-16	Champions League	Qualifying round	4–1	(Moldova) FC Noroc Nimoreni	Marenić (4)
2015-16	Champions League	Qualifying round	3–0	(Croatia) ŽNK Osijek	Poljak (2), +1 o.g.
2015-16	Champions League	Round of 32	0–0	(Germany) Wolfsburg	—
2015-16	Champions League	Round of 32	0–4	(Germany) Wolfsburg	—
2016-17	Champions League	Qualifying round	1–1	(Iceland) Breiðablik	Quincey (1)
2016-17	Champions League	Qualifying round	3–2	(Wales) Cardiff Met.	Filipović (1), Quincey (1), Tseng (1)
2016-17	Champions League	Qualifying round	2–0	(Bulgaria) NSA Sofia	Quincey (1), Slović (1)
2017-18	Champions League	Qualifying round	7–1	(Israel) Kiryat Gat	Filipović (2), Radojičić (2), Dorine (1), Marcela (1), Slović (1)
2017-18	Champions League	Qualifying round	6–0	(Montenegro) Breznica	Slović (2), Dorine (1), Krstanovska (1), Pavlović (1), Radojičić (1)
2017-18	Champions League	Qualifying round	0–2	(Norway) Avaldsnes	—
2018-19	Champions League	Qualifying round	1–0	(Israel) Kiryat Gat	Pleuler (1)
2018-19	Champions League	Qualifying round	4–0	(Montenegro) Breznica	Okyere (2), Hix (1), Rosa (1)
2018-19	Champions League	Qualifying round	5–0	(Switzerland) Basel	Baka (1), Hix (1), Matić (1), Pavlović (1), Slović (1)
2018-19	Champions League	Round of 32	0–7	(Germany) Bayern Munich	—
2018-19	Champions League	Round of 32	0–4	(Germany) Bayern Munich	—
2019-20	Champions League	Qualifying round	12–0	(Moldova) Agarista-ȘS Anenii Noi	Adamek (3), Delgadillo (3), Filipović (3), Denda (1), Matić (1), Williams (1)
2019-20	Champions League	Qualifying round	7–0	(Slovakia) Slovan Bratislava	Matić (2), Adamek (1), Filipović (1), Slović (1), Stupar (1), +1 o.g.
2019-20	Champions League	Qualifying round	2–2	(Hungary) Ferencvárosi	Filipović (1), Matić (1)
2019-20	Champions League	Round of 32	2–3	(Spain) Atlético Madrid	Slović (1), Matić (1)
2019-20	Champions League	Round of 32	1–1	(Spain) Atlético Madrid	Adamek (1)
2020-21	Champions League	First qualifying round	4–0	(Moldova) Agarista-ȘS Anenii Noi	Filipović (1), Slović (3)
2020-21	Champions League	Second qualifying round	7–0	(Bulgaria) NSA Sofia	Slović (1), Filipović (1), Matić (3), Ćirić (1), Baka (1)
2020-21	Champions League	Round of 32	0–5	(Germany) Wolfsburg	—
2020-21	Champions League	Round of 32	0–2	(Germany) Wolfsburg	—
2021-22	Champions League	Round 1 SF	5–2	(Republic of Ireland) Peamount United	Filipović (4), Kusi (1)
2021-22	Champions League	Round 1 F	3–5	(Netherlands) Twente	Owusu-Ansah (2), Filipović (1)
2022-23	Champions League	Round 1 SF	Bye		
2022-23	Champions League	Round 1 F	1–3	(Norway) Brann	Filipović (1)
2023-24	Champions League	Round 1 SF	7–0	(Faroe Islands) KÍ	Slović (1), Martins (1), Boaduwaa (1), Filipović (1), Langdok (1), Stupar (1), Uvalin (1)
2023-24	Champions League	Round 1 F	2–1	(Finland) KuPS	Boaduwaa (2)
2023-24	Champions League	Round 2	1–2	(Sweden) Rosengård	Belovan (1)
2023-24	Champions League	Round 2	1–5	(Sweden) Rosengård	Filipović (1)

=== Top scorers in UEFA competitions ===
Rank	Player	Goals	Years
1	(Bosnia and Herzegovina) Milena Nikolić	20	2013–15
2	(Serbia) Tijana Filipović	19	2014–present
3	(Serbia) Violeta Slović	18	2010–present
4	(Serbia) Jelena Čubrilo	13	2010–14
5	(Serbia) Tijana Matić	10	2015–21
