= Tijana Filipović =

Serbian footballer (born 1999)

Personal information
- Date of birth: 26 May 1999 (age 27)
- Place of birth: Ruma, Serbia, FR Yugoslavia
- Height: 1.60 m (5 ft 3 in)
- Position: Midfielder

Team information
- Current team: FC Spartak Moscow (women)
- Number: 20

Senior career*
Years	Team	Apps	(Gls)
2014—2024	Spartak Subotica		
2024—	FC Spartak Moscow		

International career^{‡}
	Serbia	28	(14)
- * Club domestic league appearances and goals as of 19:10, 30 August 2019 (UTC) ‡ National team caps and goals as of 18:24, 2 December 2023 (UTC)

Tijana Filipović (Serbian Cyrillic: Тијана Филиповић; born 26 May 1999) is a Serbian footballer who plays as a midfielder for FC Spartak Moscow and has appeared for the Serbia women's national team.

== Career ==
Filipović has been capped for the Serbia national team, appearing for the team during the 2019 FIFA Women's World Cup qualifying cycle.

== International goals ==
No.	Date	Venue	Opponent	Score	Result	Competition
1.	19 October 2017	Čukarički Stadium, Belgrade, Serbia	Israel	1–0	2–0	2019 FIFA Women's World Cup qualification
2.	2 March 2019	Igralište Lučkog, Zagreb, Croatia	Bosnia and Herzegovina	2–0	2–0	2019 Istria Cup
3.	5 October 2019	Petar Miloševski Training Centre, Skopje, North Macedonia	North Macedonia	3–0	6–0	UEFA Women's Euro 2022 qualifying
4.	6 March 2020	Stadion FK Kolubara, Belgrade, Serbia	North Macedonia	3–1	8–1	UEFA Women's Euro 2022 qualifying
5.	6 March 2020	Stadion FK Kolubara, Belgrade, Serbia	North Macedonia	5–1	8–1	UEFA Women's Euro 2022 qualifying
6.	24 October 2020	Serbian FA Sports Center, Stara Pazova, Serbia	Kazakhstan	2–1	4–1	UEFA Women's Euro 2022 qualifying
7.	23 February 2022	Gürsel Aksel Stadium, İzmir, Turkey	Turkey	1–0	5–2	2023 FIFA Women's World Cup qualification
8.	23 February 2022	Gürsel Aksel Stadium, İzmir, Turkey	Turkey	5–2	5–2	2023 FIFA Women's World Cup qualification
9.	7 April 2022	Serbian FA Sports Center, Stara Pazova, Serbia	Israel	2–0	4–0	2023 FIFA Women's World Cup qualification
10.	17 February 2023	Alanya, Turkey	Bosnia and Herzegovina	2–2	3–2	Friendly
11.	17 February 2023	Alanya, Turkey	Bosnia and Herzegovina	3–2	3–2	Friendly
12.	7 April 2023	Serbian FA Sports Center, Stara Pazova, Serbia	Bosnia and Herzegovina	2–0	6–0	Friendly
13.	7 April 2023	Serbian FA Sports Center, Stara Pazova, Serbia	Bosnia and Herzegovina	4–0	6–0	Friendly
14.	7 April 2023	Serbian FA Sports Center, Stara Pazova, Serbia	Bosnia and Herzegovina	5–0	6–0	Friendly
15.	14 July 2023	Matija Gubec Stadium, Krško, Slovenia	Slovenia	2–0	3–0	Friendly
16.	23 February 2024	Serbian FA Sports Center, Stara Pazova, Serbia	Iceland	1–0	1–1	2023–24 UEFA Women's Nations League play-offs
17.	9 April 2024	Ménfői úti Stadion, Győr, Hungary	Israel	2–1	4–2	UEFA Women's Euro 2025 qualifying
18.	12 June 2024	Serbian FA Sports Center, Stara Pazova, Serbia	Israel	1–0	1–0	UEFA Women's Euro 2025 qualifying
19.	2 December 2025	Mardan Sports Complex, Antalya, Turkey	Czech Republic	2–1	2–1	Friendly
