= ŽFK Napredak Kruševac =

Napredak Kruševac
- Full name: Ženski Fudbalski Klub Napredak Kruševac
- Founded: 23 September 1989
- Website: https://www.facebook.com/pages/%D0%96%D0%A4%D0%9A-%D0%9D%D0%B0%D0%BF%D1%80%D0%B5%D0%B4%D0%B0%D0%BA-%D0%9A%D1%80%D1%83%D1%88%D0%B5%D0%B2%D0%B0%D1%86/147264568654030
Home colours	Away colours

ŽFK Napredak Kruševac is a Serbian women's football club from Kruševac founded in 1989. It has won one Serbian league and three Serbian cups including a double in 2007. It has played three more cup finals since, but lost them. Most recently, it was second in both competitions in 2013.

In its only appearance to date in the UEFA Champions League to date Napredak didn't make it past the qualifying stage.

== Honours ==
=== Titles ===
- 1 Serbian League: 2007
- 3 Serbian Cups: 2004, 2005, 2007

=== UEFA competition record ===
Season	Competition	Stage	Result	Opponent	Scorers
2007-08	UEFA Women's Cup	Qualifying Stage	0–7; 2–4; 6–2	(Russia) Rossiyanka (Ukraine) Arsenal Kharkiv (Georgia (country)) Dinamo Tbilisi	Besić, Malimić; Malimić 3, Karadžić, Todorović, Vasić
