= ŽFK Mašinac PZP Niš =

Mašinac PZP
- Full name: Ženski fudbalski klub Mašinac PZP
- Founded: 1970
- Ground: Mašinac stadium, Niš
- Capacity: 5,000
- Chairman: (Serbia) Milutin Gašević
- Manager: (Serbia) Perica Krstić
- League: First League (II)
- 2023–24: ▼8th, Super Liga (relegated)
Home colours	Away colours

ŽFK Mašinac PZP (Serbian Cyrillic: ЖФК Maшинaц ПЗП) is a women's football club based in Niš, Serbia. The club was the most successful women's football club of SFR Yugoslavia, FR Yugoslavia and Serbia. They play at Mašinac Stadium, in Delijski Vis neighbourhood in Niš.

== History ==
Mašinac was founded 1970. In 1987, the club moved to a new stadium in Delijski Vis, Niš. In 1990, they made sponsorship an agreement with Niš Tobacco Factory.

The team manager Perica Krstić, has been the first coach of the Yugoslav women's national team since 1974, and has been the coach of the Yugoslav women's national team for over 20 years.

== Titles ==
Mašinac is the most successful women's football club of FR Yugoslavia and Serbia, winning 19 Yugoslav titles and 10 Yugoslav Cups. The club succeeded to organize a school of football (over 150 players) with its own stadium and side fields.

== Current squad ==
Note: Flags indicate national team as defined under FIFA eligibility rules; some limited exceptions apply. Players may hold more than one non-FIFA nationality.

No.	Pos.	Nation	Player
1	GK	(Serbia) SRB	Dragana Mitić
2	DF	(Serbia) SRB	Marija Nikolić
3	DF	(Serbia) SRB	Maja Trajković
4	DF	(Serbia) SRB	Maja Dimitijević
6	MF	(Serbia) SRB	Ivana Zdravković
7	MF	(Serbia) SRB	Milica Stanković
8	DF	(Serbia) SRB	Danijela Trajković
9	MF	(Serbia) SRB	Milena Pesić
10	MF	(Serbia) SRB	Indira Ilić
11	FW	(Serbia) SRB	Tamara Stojanovic
12	GK	(Serbia) SRB	Ana Marinković
13	FW	(Serbia) SRB	Kristina Krstić

No.	Pos.	Nation	Player
14	DF	(Serbia) SRB	Aleksandra Ristić
15	DF	(Serbia) SRB	Jovana Mitrović
16	FW	(Serbia) SRB	Milena Cvetković
17	FW	(Serbia) SRB	Marija Radoičić
18	MF	(Serbia) SRB	Ana Lilic
19	MF	(Serbia) SRB	Milica Stojanović
20	FW	(Serbia) SRB	Jovana Sretenović
21	GK	(Serbia) SRB	Nevena Stojaković
31	DF	(Serbia) SRB	Aleksandra Dobrosavljević
35	FW	(Serbia) SRB	Biljana Bradić

== Notable former players ==
- (Serbia) Jovana Sretenović
- (Serbia) Christina Sampanidis
- (United States) Aricca Vitanza
- (United States) Catiana Vitanza

== Titles ==
=== Official ===
- National championships (24)
  - Champion of Yugoslavia: 1983/84, 1984/85, 1985/86, 1986/87, 1987/88, 1988/89, 1989/90, 1991/92, 1992/93, 1994/95, 1995/96, 1996/97, 1997/98, 1998/99, 1999/00, 2000/01, 2001/02
  - Champion of Serbia and Montenegro: 2002/03, 2003/04, 2004/05, 2005/06
  - Champion of Serbia: 2007/08, 2008/09, 2009/10
- National cup (15)
  - Cup of Yugoslavia: 1982/83, 1983/84, 1987/88, 1988/89, 1990/91, 1991/92, 1994/95, 1995/96, 1996/97, 1998/99
  - Cup of Serbia and Montenegro: 2002/03
  - Serbian Women's Cup: 2007/08, 2008/09, 2009/10, 2010/11

=== Invitational ===
- Menton Tournament (1): 1989
