= Serbian Women's Cup =

Куп Србије у фудбалу за жене
- Founded: 2007
- Region: Serbia
- Teams: 16
- Current champions: ŽFK Crvena zvezda (2)
- Most championships: ŽFK Spartak Subotica (10 titles)

The Serbian Women's Cup (Serbian: Kupa Srbija za zene) is the national women's football cup competition in Serbia and was first held in 2007.

== List of finals ==
The predecessor of the cup was the Cup of Yugoslavia, held from 1975 to 1991, after that the Cup of FR Yugoslavia until 2002 and the Cup of Serbia and Montenegro until 2006. Those cup winners are listed. After that, the list of finals:

Yugoslavia Cup winners

- 1975 ŽNK Zagreb
- 1977 ŽNK Loto Zagreb
- 1978 ŽNK Loto Zagreb
- 1979 ŽFK Sloga Zemun
- 1980 ŽNK Sloboda '78 Zagreb
- 1981 ŽFK Sloga Zemun
- 1982 ŽNK Sloboda '78 Zagreb
- 1983 ŽFK Mašinac Niš
- 1984 ŽFK Mašinac Niš
- 1985 ŽFK Sloga Zemun
- 1986 ŽFK Željezničar Sarajevo
- 1987 ŽNK Maksimir Zagreb
- 1988 ŽFK Mašinac Niš
- 1989 ŽFK Mašinac Niš
- 1990 ŽNK Maksimir Zagreb
- 1991 ŽFK Classic Mašinac Niš

FR Yugoslavia Cup winners

- 1992 Mašinac Niš
- 1993 Sloga Zemun
- 1994 Sloga Zemun
- 1995 Mašinac Niš
- 1996 Mašinac Niš
- 1997 Mašinac Niš
- 1998 Yumco Vranje
- 1999 Mašinac Niš
- 2000 Yumco Vranje
- 2001 Yumco Vranje
- 2002 Yumco Vranje

Serbia and Montenegro Cup winners

- 2003 Mašinac Niš
- 2004 Napredak Kruševac
- 2005 Napredak Kruševac
- 2006 Napredak Kruševac

Year	Winner	Result	Runner-up
2007	Napredak Kruševac	3–1	Kolibri Kuršumlija
2008	Mašinac Niš	2–0	Napredak Kruševac
2009	Mašinac Niš	2–0	Napredak Kruševac
2010	Mašinac Niš	5–2	Kolibri Kuršumlija
2011	Mašinac Niš	4–1	Spartak Subotica
2012	Spartak Subotica	2–1 (a.e.t.)	Crvena zvezda
2013	Spartak Subotica	3–0	Napredak Kruševac
2014	Spartak Subotica	8–0	Mašinac Niš
2015	Spartak Subotica	3–1	Crvena zvezda
2016	Spartak Subotica	4–0	Mašinac Niš
2017	Spartak Subotica	2–1	Mašinac Niš
2018	Crvena zvezda	3–0	ŽFK Vojvodina
2019	Spartak Subotica	3–1	Crvena zvezda
2020	Cancelled due to COVID-19 pandemic		
2021	Spartak Subotica	3–1	Mašinac Niš
2022	Spartak Subotica	5–0	ŽFK Sloga Zemun
2023	Spartak Subotica	2–0	Crvena zvezda
2024	Crvena zvezda	3–0	Spartak Subotica

== See also ==
- Serbian Cup, men's edition
