= Serbia women's national football team =

Women's association football team

Serbia
- Nickname: Crvene vile (The Red fairies)
- Association: Fudbalski savez Srbije (FSS)
- Confederation: UEFA (Europe)
- Head coach: Lidija Stojkanović
- Captain: Violeta Slović
- Most caps: Violeta Slović (117)
- Top scorer: Jovana Damnjanović (21)
- FIFA code: SRB
First colours	Second colours

FIFA ranking
- Current: 35 (20 October 2026)
- Highest: 28 (July – August 2003; September 2005)
- Lowest: 46 (March 2011; March 2014; July 2015)

First international
- Slovenia 0–5 Serbia (Dravograd, Slovenia; 5 May 2007)

Biggest win
- Serbia 8–1 North Macedonia (Belgrade, Serbia; 6 March 2020)

Biggest defeat
- Switzerland 9–0 Serbia (Nyon, Switzerland, 21 September 2013)

The Serbia women's national football team represents Serbia in international women's football competitions and is controlled by the Football Association of Serbia.

== Background ==
It was previously known as the Yugoslavia women's national football team from 15 January 1992 until 4 February 2003, and then as the Serbia and Montenegro women's national football team until 3 June 2006 when Serbia declared independence as the successor state to the State Union of Serbia and Montenegro. It was officially renamed the Serbia women's national football team on 28 June 2006, while the Montenegro women's national football team was created to represent the new state of Montenegro.

Both FIFA and UEFA consider the Serbia national team the direct descendant of the Serbia and Montenegro national team.

Between 1921 and 1992, this team did not exist as we know it today, since Serbia was part of the Kingdom of Yugoslavia (1918–1943) and later on, the Socialist Federative Republic of Yugoslavia (1945–1991). The Serbia national team existed from 1919 to 1921, and then ceased to exist following the creation of the first Kingdom of Yugoslavia. The new national team formed in 1992 was considered the direct descendant of the Yugoslavia national team, as it kept Yugoslavia's former status, which was not the case for any other country resulting from the breakup of Yugoslavia.

== History ==
After the dissolution of Serbia and Montenegro federation in 2006, the newly created women's team of Serbia played the first competitive match against Slovenia in May 2007, where they beat the hosts 5–0. For much of the late 2000s to 2010s, Serbia had been an insignificant name in the women's stage, only at best managed to finish in third, though the team did have some good results like an impressive 2–2 draw to powerhouse England in the UEFA Women's Euro 2013 qualifying or the 1–1 draw to Denmark in the 2015 FIFA Women's World Cup qualification.

During the 2023 FIFA Women's World Cup qualification, Serbia began with two defeats against European powerhouse Germany and rising force Portugal, leaving expectation as Serbia would again fail to qualify for a major tournament. However, Serbia began its resurgence with consecutive wins against Bulgaria, Israel and Turkey, before getting what would be the greatest achievement ever in their qualification campaign, beating European giant Germany 3–2 in the returning fixture, and thus increased hope for Serbia to qualify for the first ever major international tournament in the history.

== Team image ==
=== Nicknames ===
The Serbia women's national football team has been known or nicknamed as the "Beli orlovi (The White Eagles)".

=== Rivalries ===
Like the men's counterparts, the women's team of Serbia also shares a rivalry with Croatia, albeit not at the scale of the men's sides. Neither sides have ever managed to debut at a major tournament, although Serbia has greatly improved at women's football in recent years, notably during the 2023 FIFA Women's World Cup qualification.

== Results and fixtures ==
The following is a list of match results in the last 12 months, as well as any future matches that have been scheduled.

Legend

Win Draw Loss Fixture

=== 2025 ===
28 November 2025 Friendly	Czech Republic	0–1	Serbia	Antalya, Turkey
13:00		Report	Damnjanović 17'

2 December Friendly	Czech Republic	1–2	Serbia	Antalya, Turkey
13:00	Cahynova 46'		Matejić 2'; Filipović 57'

=== 2026 ===
3 March 2027 FIFA Women's World Cup qualification	Denmark	3–1	Serbia	Horsens, Denmark
18:00	Bredgaard 13'; Vangsgaard 19'; Harder 64' (pen.)	Report (FIFA); Report (UEFA)	Stokić 40'	Stadium: Forum Horsens Stadium; Attendance: 2,814; Referee: Abigail Byrne (England)

7 March 2027 FIFA Women's World Cup qualification	Serbia	0–0	Sweden	Stara Pazova, Serbia
16:00		Report (FIFA); Report (UEFA)		Stadium: Serbian FA Sports Center; Attendance: 412; Referee: Fabienne Michel (Germany)

14 April 2027 FIFA Women's World Cup qualification	Serbia	0–6	Italy	Leskovac, Serbia
18:15		Report (FIFA); Report (UEFA)	Girelli 20'; Oliviero 36'; Lenzini 45'; Caruso 61'; Cantore 88'; Greggi 90+4'	Stadium: Dubočica Stadium; Attendance: 686; Referee: Eleni Antoniou (Greece)

18 April 2027 FIFA Women's World Cup qualification	Sweden	1–0	Serbia	Solna, Sweden
16:00	Blackstenius 50'	Report (FIFA); Report (UEFA)		Stadium: Nationalarenan; Attendance: 20,097; Referee: Désirée Blanco (Switzerland)

5 June 2027 FIFA Women's World Cup qualification	Italy	3–0	Serbia	Pisa, Italy
18:15	Bergamaschi 61'; Caruso 81'; Bonansea 88'	Report (FIFA); Report (UEFA)		Stadium: Arena Garibaldi; Referee: Lina Lehtovaara (Finland)

9 June 2027 FIFA Women's World Cup qualification	Serbia	1–4	Denmark	Stara Pazova, Serbia
19:00	Poljak 15'	Report (FIFA); Report (UEFA)	Fløe 8'; Vangsgaard 14', 42'; Harder 40' (pen.)	Stadium: Serbian FA Sports Center; Referee: Rasa Grigonė (Lithuania)

9 October 2026 2027 FIFA Women's World Cup qualification	Finland	3–1	Serbia	Tampere
17:30 (18:30 UTC+3)	Koivisto 28'; Lindström 36'; Franssi 88'	Report (FIFA); Report (UEFA)	Milivojević 82'	Stadium: Tammelan Stadion; Attendance: 6,296; Referee: Catarina Campos (Portugal)

13 October 2026 2027 FIFA Women's World Cup qualification	Serbia	1–3	Finland	Tampere
17:00	Summanen 27' (o.g.)	Report (FIFA); Report (UEFA)	Koivisto 3'; Lehtola 55'; Ulenius 89'	Stadium: Tammelan Stadion; Referee: Marta Huerta De Aza (Spain)

== Coaching staff ==
=== Current coaching staff ===
Position	Name	Ref.
Head coach	Lidija Stojkanović	
Assistant coach	Danka Podovac	
Goalkeeping coach		
Physical coach		

=== Manager history ===
- Predrag Grozdanović (????–????)
- Dragiša Zečević (20??–2024)
- Lidija Stojkanović (2025– )

== Players ==
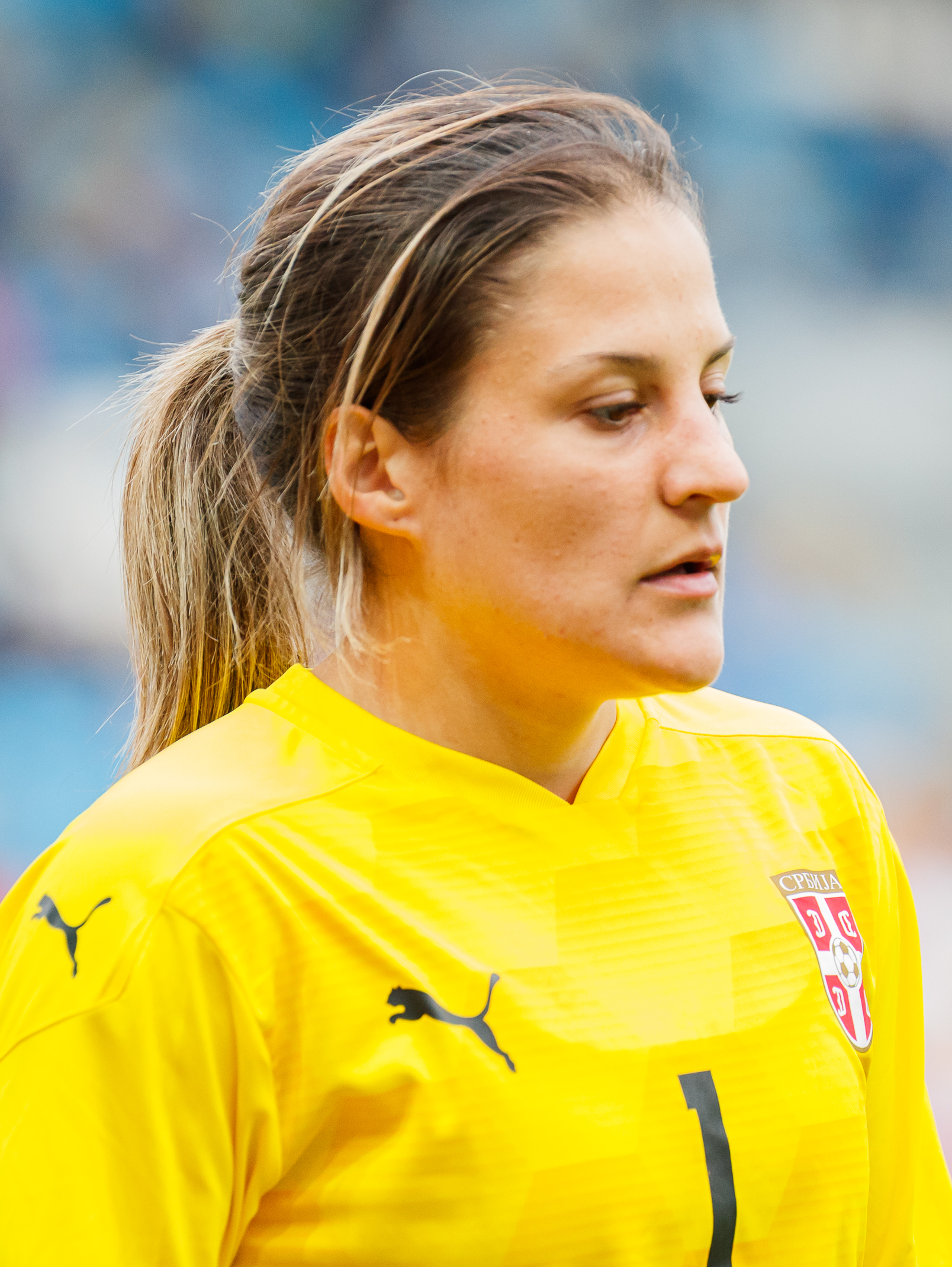
Milica Kostić played numerous games for Serbia

=== Current squad ===
- The following players were named to the squad for the friendly matches against Czech Republic on 28 November and 2 December 2025 in Antalya, Turkey.

No.	Pos.	Player	Date of birth (age)	Caps	Club
1	GK	Milica Kostić	21 December 1997 (age 28)	{{{caps}}}	(Hungary) Ferencváros
12	GK	Ema Aleksić	10 October 2005 (age 21)	{{{caps}}}	(Denmark) HB Køge
23	GK	Jovana Đukić	18 June 2002 (age 24)	{{{caps}}}	(Czech Republic) Sparta Prague
4	DF	Aleksandra Gajić	31 August 2006 (age 20)	{{{caps}}}	(France) Saint-Étienne
5	DF	Violeta Slović	30 August 1991 (age 35)	{{{caps}}}	(Serbia) Spartak Subotica
6	DF	Nevena Damjanović	12 April 1993 (age 33)	{{{caps}}}	(Russia) CSKA Moscow
14	DF	Milica Gaković	6 June 2004 (age 22)	{{{caps}}}	(Serbia) TSC
15	DF	Milica Šarić	3 March 2005 (age 21)	{{{caps}}}	(Serbia) Red Star Belgrade
17	DF	Allegra Poljak	5 February 1999 (age 27)	{{{caps}}}	(Spain) Madrid CFF
18	DF	Emilija Petrović	27 December 2002 (age 23)	{{{caps}}}	(Sweden) Kristianstads
19	DF	Mina Matijević	24 March 2006 (age 20)	{{{caps}}}	(Germany) Eintracht Frankfurt
10	MF	Jelena Čanković	13 August 1995 (age 31)	{{{caps}}}	(England) Brighton & Hove Albion
17	MF	Sara Pavlović	10 May 1996 (age 30)	{{{caps}}}	(Portugal) Famalicão
20	MF	Tijana Filipović	25 May 1999 (age 27)	{{{caps}}}	(Russia) Spartak Moscow
21	MF	Živana Stupar	23 September 2002 (age 24)	{{{caps}}}	(Serbia) Spartak Subotica
22	MF	Sofija Sremčević	13 October 2003 (age 23)	{{{caps}}}	(Serbia) Red Star Belgrade
7	FW	Miljana Ivanović	17 May 2000 (age 26)	{{{caps}}}	(United States) Houston Dash
8	FW	Anastasija Ćirić	11 November 2006 (age 20)	{{{caps}}}	(Serbia) Red Star Belgrade
9	FW	Jovana Damnjanović	24 November 1994 (age 31)	{{{caps}}}	(Germany) Bayern Munich
11	FW	Nina Matejić	8 February 2005 (age 21)	{{{caps}}}	(Russia) Zenit
13	FW	Milica Mijatović	26 June 1991 (age 35)	{{{caps}}}	(Turkey) Ankara B.B. Fomget
19	FW	Mina Čavić	24 March 2006 (age 20)	{{{caps}}}	(Germany) Eintracht Frankfurt

=== Recent call-ups ===
- The following players have been called up to a Serbia squad in the past 12 months.

Pos.	Player	Date of birth (age)	Caps	Goals	Club	Latest call-up
DF	Anđela Frajtović	8 July 2000 (age 26)	0	0	(Hungary) Ferencváros	v. Slovenia, 27 October 2025
MF	Marija Ilić	14 September 2003 (age 23)	0	0	(Serbia) Spartak Subotica	v. Slovenia, 27 October 2025
MF	Vesna Milivojević	8 December 2001 (age 24)	0	0	(Sweden) Malmö	v. Slovenia, 27 October 2025
MF	Mary Stanić-Floody	22 April 2004 (age 22)	0	0	(Australia) Canberra United	v. Slovenia, 27 October 2025
MF	Dejana Stefanović	5 July 1997 (age 29)	0	0	(Serbia) Red Star Belgrade	v. Slovenia, 27 October 2025

== Records ==
- Active players in **bold**, statistics correct as of 2020.

=== Most capped players ===
#	Player	Year(s)	Caps

=== Top goalscorers ===
#	Player	Year(s)	Goals	Caps

== Competitive record ==
=== FIFA Women's World Cup ===
FIFA Women's World Cup record									Qualification record						
Year	Result	Pld	W	D*	L	GF	GA	GD	Pld	W	D*	L	GF	GA	GD
as FR Yugoslavia															
(Sweden) 1995	Withdrew								UEFA Euro 1995						
(United States) 1999	Did not qualify								8	7	1	0	28	5	+23
(United States) 2003	Did not qualify								6	6	0	0	23	3	+20
as Serbia and Montenegro															
(China) 2007	Did not qualify								8	2	0	6	6	27	-21
as Serbia															
(Germany) 2011	Did not qualify								10	2	3	5	7	19	-12
(Canada) 2015	Did not qualify								10	3	1	6	16	34	-18
(France) 2019	Did not qualify								8	2	1	5	5	13	-8
(Australia) (New Zealand) 2023	Did not qualify								10	7	0	3	26	14	+12
(Brazil) 2027	Did not qualify								Future events						
(Costa Rica) (Jamaica) (Mexico) (United States) 2031									Future events						
(United Kingdom) 2035									Future events						
Total	-	-	-	-	-	-	-	-	60	29	6	25	111	115	-4

*Denotes draws including knockout matches decided on penalty kicks.

=== Olympic Games ===
Summer Olympics record
Year	Result	GP	W	D*	L	GS	GA
as FR Yugoslavia
(United States) 1996	Withdrew						
(Australia) 2000	Did not qualify						
as Serbia and Montenegro
(Greece) 2004	Did not qualify						
as Serbia
(China) 2008	Did not qualify						
(United Kingdom) 2012	Did not qualify						
(Brazil) 2016	Did not qualify						
(Japan) 2020	Did not qualify						
(France) 2024	Unable to qualify (Note: Serbia was unable to qualify since Serbia was in the “League B” at the 2023–24 UEFA Women's Nations League.)						
(United States) 2028	Future events						
(Australia) 2032	Future events						
Total	-	-	-	-	-	-	-

*Denotes draws including knockout matches decided on penalty kicks.

=== UEFA Women's Championship ===
UEFA Women's Championship record									Qualifying record								
Year	Result	Pld	W	D*	L	GF	GA	GD	Pld	W	D*	L	GF	GA	GD	P/R	Rnk
as FR Yugoslavia																	
(Italy) 1993	Did not qualify								1	0	0	1	0	3	-3	–	
(Germany) 1995	Withdrew								Withdrew								
(Norway) (Sweden) 1997	Did not qualify								6	3	1	2	13	9	-4	–	
(Germany) 2001	Did not qualify								8	1	0	7	4	25	-21	–	
as Serbia and Montenegro																	
(England) 2005	Did not qualify								8	1	0	7	3	25	-22	–	
as Serbia																	
(Finland) 2009	Did not qualify								8	2	0	6	11	24	-13	–	
(Sweden) 2013	Did not qualify								8	4	1	3	15	18	-3	–	
(Netherlands) 2017	Did not qualify								8	3	1	4	10	21	-11	–	
(England) 2022	Did not qualify								8	4	0	4	21	12	+9	–	
(Switzerland) 2025	Did not qualify								10	5	2	3	17	15	+2	(Note: From Euro 2025 onwards a new qualifying format was introduced, linked to the Women's Nations League where teams are divided into leagues with promotion/relegation between the leagues at the end of each cycle.)	21st
Total	-	-	-	-	-	-	-	-	65	23	5	37	94	152	-66	21st	

*Denotes draws including knockout matches decided on penalty kicks.

=== UEFA Women's Nations League ===
UEFA Women's Nations League record
Year	League	Group	Pos	Pld	W	D	L	GF	GA	P/R	Rnk
2023–24	B	3	2nd	8	3	2	3	12	8	*	22nd
2025	B	3	1st	6	4	2	0	7	1	▲*	19th
Total				14	7	4	3	19	9	22nd and 19th	

▲	Promoted at end of season
Same position	No movement at end of season
▼	Relegated at end of season
*	Participated in promotion/relegation play-offs

== See also ==
- Sport in Serbia
  - Football in Serbia
    - Women's football in Serbia
- Serbia women's national under-19 football team
- Serbia women's national under-17 football team
- Serbia men's national football team
