= Serbian Women's Super League =

Top women's football (soccer) league in Serbia

- Founded: 2006
- Country: Serbia
- Confederation: UEFA
- Divisions: 1
- Number of clubs: 8
- Level on pyramid: 1
- Relegation to: Serbian First Women's League
- Domestic cup: Serbian Women's Cup
- International cup: UEFA Champions League
- Current champions: ŽFK Crvena zvezda (3) (2025-26)
- Most championships: ŽFK Spartak Subotica (13 titles)
- Current: 2026-27 season

The Serbian Women's Super League (Serbian: Супер лига / Super Liga Žene) is the top level women's football league of Serbia. It was founded in 2006. The team with the most championships to date is ŽFK Spartak Subotica with 13 titles. The current champions are ŽFK Crvena zvezda, winning their first title in 2023/24 season.

Until 2013/14 the top-level league was called Prva Ženska Liga (First League). For that season the Super Liga was created on top of the league system. The second-level league is now the prva liga.

== Current format ==
Until 2012/13 the league played a double round robin. The winner was the champion of Serbia.

From 2013/14 onwards, with only eight teams in the league there are two stages. In the first stage, each team plays the other teams two times for a total of 14 matches. After that, the top four teams play a Championship play-off and the bottom four a relegation play-off (play-out). Matches against the teams from the other play-off group are deleted from the standings, thus only matches against teams from the same play-off group make the final standings. In each play-off teams meet each other twice again for a total of 20 matches per season, of which 12 are taken into account for the final standings. The winning team of the championship play-off is Serbian champion and qualifies for a spot in the UEFA Women's Champions League. The bottom placed team of the play-out is relegated to the second league. When tied on points, better results with tied teams decide the rank.

== 2025/2026 teams ==
The following teams took part during the 2025/26 season:

- Crvena Zvezda
- Kanjiža
- Partizan
- Radnički
- Spartak Subotica
- Mašinac PZP
- Milutinac
- Vojvodina

== Serbian Champions ==
Season	Champion	Runners-up
2006–07	ŽFK Napredak (1)	ŽFK Mašinac
2007–08	ŽFK Mašinac (1)	ŽFK Napredak
2008–09	ŽFK Mašinac (2)	ŽFK Napredak
2009–10	ŽFK Mašinac (3)	ŽFK Spartak
2010–11	ŽFK Spartak (1)	ŽFK Napredak
2011–12	ŽFK Spartak (2)	ŽFK Crvena zvezda
2012–13	ŽFK Spartak (3)	ŽFK Napredak
2013–14	ŽFK Spartak (4)	ŽFK Napredak
2014–15	ŽFK Spartak (5)	ŽFK Crvena zvezda
2015–16	ŽFK Spartak (6)	ŽFK Mašinac
2016–17	ŽFK Spartak (7)	ŽFK Crvena zvezda
2017–18	ŽFK Spartak (8)	ŽFK Crvena zvezda
2018–19	ŽFK Spartak (9)	ŽFK Mašinac
2019–20	ŽFK Spartak (10)	ŽFK Sloga
2020–21	ŽFK Spartak (11)	ŽFK Mašinac
2021–22	ŽFK Spartak (12)	ŽFK Crvena zvezda
2022-23	ŽFK Spartak (13)	ŽFK Crvena zvezda
2023-24	ŽFK Crvena zvezda (1)	ŽFK Spartak
2024-25	ŽFK Crvena zvezda (2)	ŽFK Spartak
2025-26	ŽFK Crvena zvezda (3)	Kanjiža

=== Titles by club ===
Team	Number Title	Season
ŽFK Spartak	13	2010/11 to 2022/23
ŽFK Crvena zvezda	3	2023/24, 2024/25, 2025/26
ŽFK Mašinac	3	2007/08, 2008/09, 2009/10
ŽFK Napredak	1	2006/07

== Champions former Yugoslavia republics ==
The women's national football league started to be played in the 1974–75 season, then still part of Yugoslavia. After the split of Yugoslavia in 1991, the league continued in the remaining state of FR Yugoslavia, that was renamed in 2002/03 to Serbia and Montenegro, until the split of the two in 2006. The succeeding league is the one of Serbia.

SFR Yugoslavia

- 1974/75 Železničar Subotica
- 1975/76 ŽNK Zagreb
- 1976/77 ŽNK Zagreb
- 1977/78 ŽNK Zagreb
- 1978/79 Sloga Zemun
- 1979/80 Sloga Zemun
- 1980/81 Sloboda '78 Zagreb
- 1981/82 Maksimir Zagreb
- 1982/83 ŽFK Željezničar Sarajevo
- 1983/84 Mašinac Niš
- 1984/85 Mašinac Niš
- 1985/86 Mašinac Niš
- 1986/87 Mašinac Niš
- 1987/88 Mašinac Niš
- 1988/89 Mašinac Niš
- 1989/90 Mašinac Niš
- 1990/91 Maksimir Zagreb

FR Yugoslavia

- 1991/92 Mašinac Classic Niš
- 1992/93 Mašinac Classic Niš
- 1993/94 Sloga Zemun
- 1994/95 Mašinac Classic Niš
- 1995/96 Mašinac Classic Niš
- 1996/97 Mašinac Classic Niš
- 1997/98 Mašinac Classic Niš
- 1998/99 Mašinac Classic Niš
- 1999/00 Mašinac Classic Niš
- 2000/01 Mašinac Classic Niš
- 2001/02 Mašinac Classic Niš

Serbia-Montenegro

- 2002/03 Mašinac Classic Niš
- 2003/04 Mašinac Niš
- 2004/05 Mašinac Niš
- 2005/06 Mašinac Niš

== Titles by clubs ==
Team	SFR	FR	S&M	SRB	Total
Mašinac PZP Niš	7	10	4	3	24
Spartak Subotica	1			13	14
ŽNK Zagreb	3				3
Dinamo-Maksimir	3				3
Sloga Zemun	2	1			3
Željezničar Sarajevo	1				1
Napredak Kruševac				1	1
ŽFK Crvena zvezda				1	1
