= List of people from Leeds =

See Category:People from Leeds

List of people from Leeds is a list of notable people from the City of Leeds in West Yorkshire, England. This list includes people from the historic settlement, and the wider metropolitan borough, and thus may include people from Horsforth, Morley, Pudsey, Otley and Wetherby and other areas of the city. This list is arranged alphabetically by surname:

Table of contents:
A B C D E F G H I J K L M N O P Q R S T U V W X Y Z
Without biographies • Not from Leeds but buried in Leeds • See also • References

== A ==
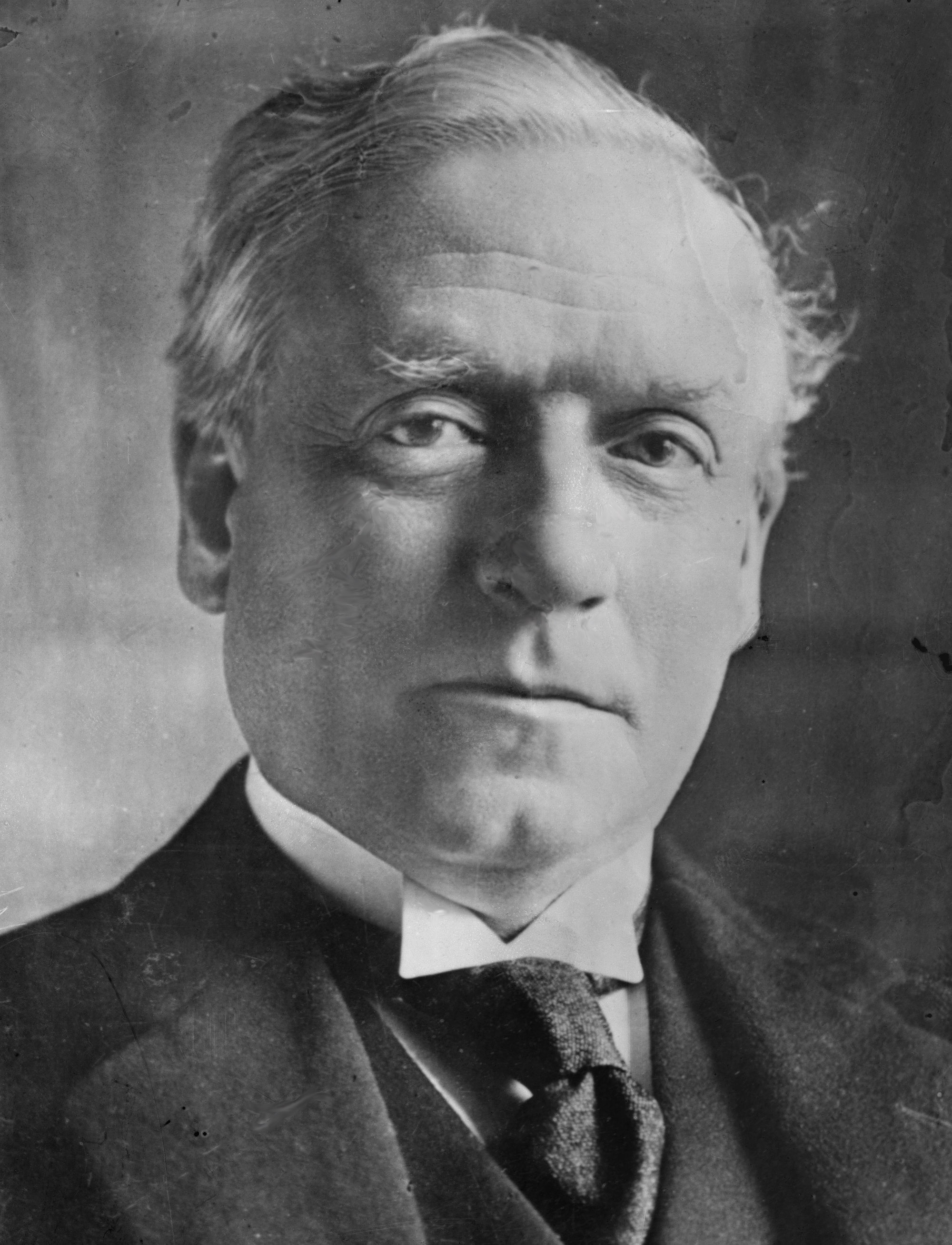
H. H. Asquith, born in Morley, Leeds, Liberal Prime Minister of the United Kingdom from 1908 to 1916

- Arthur Louis Aaron – recipient of the Victoria Cross in 1943
- Carl Ablett – former Rugby League footballer who played for the Leeds Rhinos
- Les "Juicy" Adams – rugby league footballer who played for Leeds, Huddersfield and Castleford.
- Nicola Adams – first female boxer to win an Olympic gold medal
- Joseph Aspdin – inventor of Portland cement
- H. H. Asquith – 1st Earl of Oxford & Asquith, Liberal Prime Minister of the UK from 1908 to 1916
- Alfred Atkinson – recipient of the Victoria Cross in 1900
- Alfred Austin – poet laureate

== B ==
- Ryan Bailey – rugby league player who plays for Leeds Rhinos and has represented Great Britain and England
- Corinne Bailey Rae – singer
- Christopher Paul Baker (1955) – award-winning travel writer, photographer, and adventure motorcyclist, spent his early years in Woodlesford, outside Leeds
- Mark Ballard – Green politician
- Julian Barratt – actor and musician best known for his character Howard Moon in the cult comedy series The Mighty Boosh
- Michael Barratt – Television presenter and journalist, best known for his period as the main presenter of Nationwide from 1969 to 1977.
- David Batty – former Leeds United Midfielder, now living in Filey
- Glen Baxter (artist)
- Adam Baynes – parliamentary army officer during the English Civil War and MP for Leeds during the Commonwealth; as such the first MP for the city
- Richard Beck – rugby union player for Leeds Carnegie
- Tony Bell (physicist) – educated at Leeds Modern School. He is a professor of physics at the University of Oxford and the Rutherford Appleton Laboratory. He is a senior research fellow at Somerville College, Oxford.
- Alan Bennett – performer (notably in Beyond the Fringe), playwright (e.g. The Madness of George III, Talking Heads) and scriptwriter (including The Madness of King George)
- Ivy Benson – bandleader
- Richard Bentley – classical scholar, critic, and theologian of the 17th century; served as Master of Trinity College, Cambridge
- Robert Blackburn – aviation pioneer
- Olivia Blake – MP for Sheffield Hallam
- Andy Bolton – power-lifter, current super-heavyweight deadlift and squat world record holder
- Barbara Taylor Bradford – novelist
- Jack Brett – professional motorcycle racer
- Frances Brody – author of Kate Shackelton mysteries.
- Melanie Brown – "Mel B" from the Spice Girls
- Rampage Brown – British professional wrestler
- Alistair Brownlee – triathlon world champion and Olympic gold medalist
- Jonathan Brownlee – triathlon world champion and Olympic bronze medalist
- Beryl Burton – record-breaking cyclist
- William Boynton Butler – recipient of the Victoria Cross in 1917

== C ==
- Laurence Calvert – recipient of the Victoria Cross in 1918
- Daisy Campbell – actress who plays Amelia Spencer in Emmerdale
- Danny Care – Harlequins and England rugby union scrum-half
- Sean Carr – singer; husband of Yevhenia Carr (daughter of Ukrainian politician Yulia Tymoshenko)
- Phil Carrick – cricketer who captained Yorkshire
- Thomas Chippendale – furniture maker, from Farnley, Otley
- Dave Clark – Sky Sports presenter
- Howard Clark – Walker Cup and Ryder Cup golfer
- Chris Clarkson – rugby league footballer who plays for the Leeds Rhinos
- Jon Clay – Olympic bronze medallist
- Brian Close – cricketer who captained Yorkshire, youngest man ever to play Test cricket for England
- Sean Conlon – singer best known as a member of boy band Five
- Jackson Conway – footballer
- Christian Cooke – actor
- John Craven – presenter of John Craven's Newsround (now known as Newsround)
- Paul Crowther – philosopher, university lecturer and author
- Barry Cryer – comedian

== D ==
- Ellen Wordsworth Darwin (1856–1903) – academic and Fellow of Newnham College, Cambridge
- Rowan Deacon – director and filmmaker
- Brian Deane – former Leeds United centre forward (retired)
- Lizzie Deignan – (née Armitstead; born 18 December 1988); professional world champion track and road racing cyclist. Silver medalist at the 2012 Summer Olympics road race.
- Emmanuel Dieseruvwe – footballer who plays for Salford City
- David Doherty – rugby union player
- MF Doom – British-American rapper
- Jeremy Dyson – writer and member of The League of Gentlemen

== E ==
- E. R. Eddison – fantasy writer, The Worm Ouroboros
- Andrew Edge (born David Andrew Edge) – drummer for the Thompson Twins, Uropa Lula, Savage Progress, singer with Yoyo, and currently working in Austria with Drumsing
- Tom Elliott – footballer, currently playing for Salford City
- Catherine Exley – diarist

== F ==
- Thomas Fairfax, 3rd Lord Fairfax of Cameron – general and parliamentary commander-in-chief during the English Civil War
- Gaynor Faye – known for her characters in Coronation Street and Fat Friends and winning the first series of Dancing on Ice
- Arthur Foxton Ferguson – baritone, lecturer, and German translator, founded the Folk-Song Quartet
- John Fieldhouse, Baron Fieldhouse – Royal Navy officer who commanded five submarines and a frigate before being given responsibility for Operation Corporate, the mission to recover the Falkland Islands
- Helen Fielding – novelist and screenwriter, best known as the creator of the fictional character Bridget Jones
- Caleb Folan – former footballer who played for Leeds United, Rushden and Diamonds and Hull City, amongst others
- Isabella Ford – socialist and feminist from Headingley
- James Frain – actor
- Leigh Francis, aka Avid Merrion – creator of the TV show Bo' Selecta! and Keith Lemon
- Paula Froelich - journalist and author

== G ==
- Barney Gibson – Yorkshire cricketer; in April 2011 he became the youngest cricketer to play first-class cricket in England, making his debut aged 15 years and 27 days
- Angela Griffin – actress in Coronation Street, Emmerdale and Waterloo Road
- John Atkinson Grimshaw – Victorian-era artist
- Geoff Gunney – rugby league player for Hunslet and represented Great Britain. 579 appearances for Hunslet.
- Mandip Gill – Actress best known for her role as Phoebe McQueen in Hollyoaks and companion Yasmin Khan in series 11th,12th and 13 of Doctor Who.

== H ==
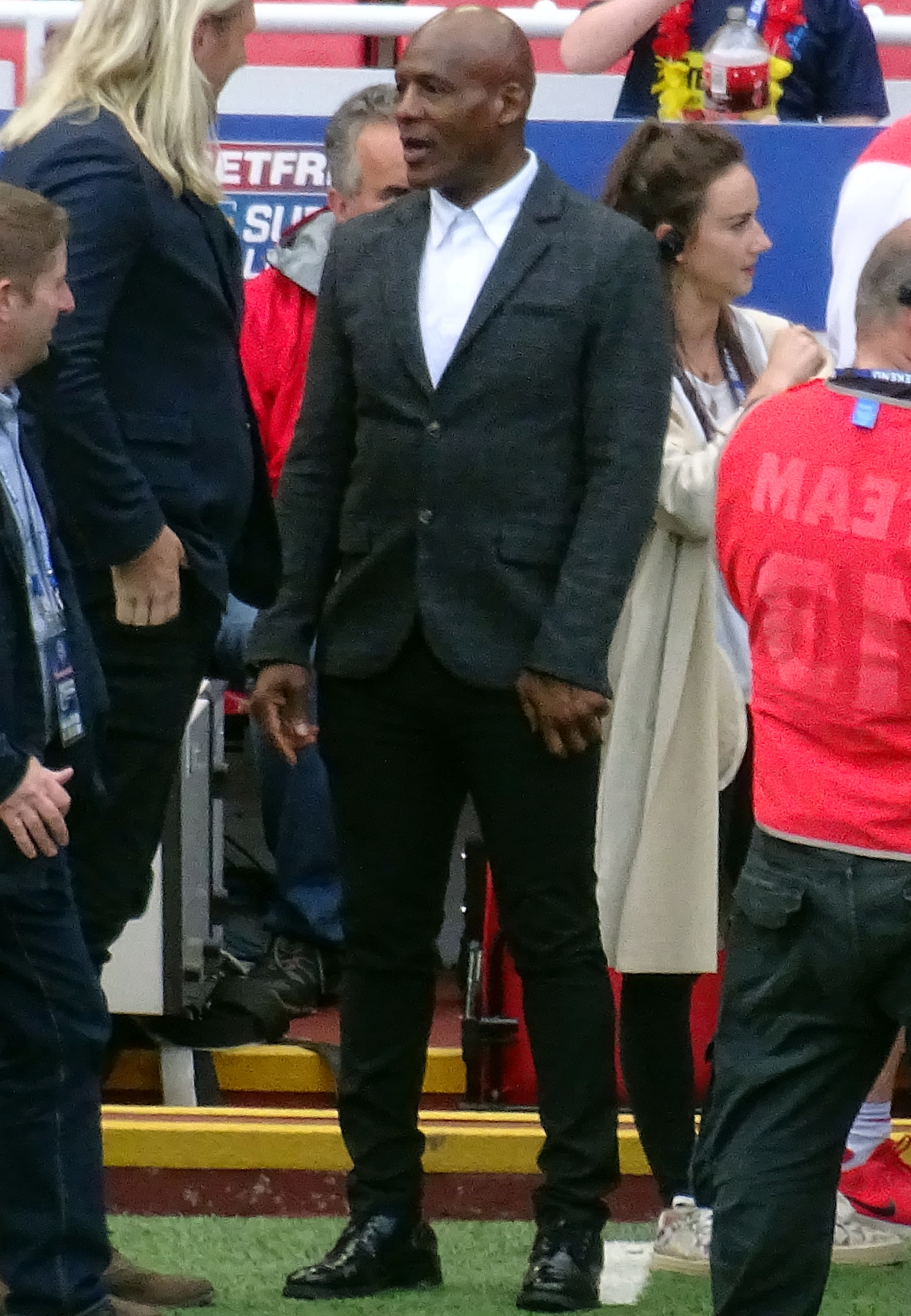
Ellery Hanley, rugby league former captain of Great Britain and England

- Erling Haaland – footballer who represents Norway and plays for Manchester City
- Ryan Hall – rugby league footballer who plays for the Leeds Rhinos and has represented England
- Willis Hall – playwright and radio and television writer, including Billy Liar and Worzel Gummidge with Leeds-born collaborator Keith Waterhouse
- Ellery Hanley – rugby league player, represented Great Britain and won the Rugby League Golden Boot
- Anne Lyon Hansen – nurse
- John Harrison – prominent woollen cloth merchant; mayor of Leeds during the 16th and 17th centuries
- Tony Harrison – poet
- David Harvey – football goalkeeper played for Leeds United and Scotland; Scotland's most successful post-war goalkeeper
- Chris Haskett – guitarist who has worked with Rollins Band, David Bowie and Tool, that lived at 52 Harold Mount between 1982 and 1987.
- Charlie Heaton – actor and musician born in Leeds, known for Stranger Things
- Kevin Hector – footballer, former player for Derby County
- Kim-Joy Hewlett – baker and cookbook author
- Oliver Hindle – singer-songwriter and music producer best known for his solo project Superpowerless
- Frazer Hines – actor in Emmerdale and Doctor Who
- David Philip Hirsch – recipient of the Victoria Cross in 1917
- Damien Hirst – artist, entrepreneur and art collector (Born in Bristol, raised in Leeds)
- Arthur Hiscoe (1848–1912), architect, lived in various Leeds districts and died at Beeston.
- Matthew Hoggard – cricketer for Yorkshire and England
- Field Marshal J N R (Nick) Houghton, Baron Houghton of Richmond – former Chief of the Defence Staff
- Richard Hoggart (24 September 1918 – 10 April 2014) – a British academic whose career covered the fields of sociology, English literature and cultural studies, with emphasis on British popular culture.
- Thomas Houseago – artist and sculptor
- Reginald Horsman – distinguished professor at the University of Wisconsin–Milwaukee
- Jonny Howson – footballer who played for Leeds United and England under-21, currently for Middlesbrough in the EFL Championship
- Paul Hunter – snooker player, died October 2006 from cancer
- Hasib Hussain – Islamic terrorist who murdered 13 people during the 7 July 2005 London bombings
- Sir Leonard Hutton – cricketer, appointed as England's first professional cricket captain in 1952

== I ==
- Ray Illingworth – England and Yorkshire cricket captain
- William H. Illingworth – Wild West pioneer photographer
- Michael Ivey – First-class cricketer

== J ==
- Michael Jackson – writer and journalist, particularly on beer and whisky
- Carl Johanneson – Super-Featherweight boxer and ranked number 2 in Europe in his weight class
- Charles Jones – cricketer and field hockey player
- Jamie Jones-Buchanan – rugby league footballer who plays for the Leeds Rhinos, and has represented both England and Great Britain

== K ==
- Gerald Kaufman – Labour politician
- James Keinhorst – rugby league player who represents Leeds Rhinos and Germany
- James Kellett – racing driver
- Geoffrey Studdert Kennedy – Anglican priest, soldier, and poet, who became known as 'Woodbine Willie' during the First World War for giving Woodbine cigarettes along with spiritual aid to injured and dying soldiers
- Mohammad Sidique Khan – Islamic terrorist who led the 7 July 2005 London bombings
- Ian King – cricketer
- Herbert Klein – barber; second-class barber aboard RMS Titanic. Died in the sinking on 15 April 1912.
- Patric Knowles – film actor who was inducted into the Hollywood Walk of Fame

== L ==
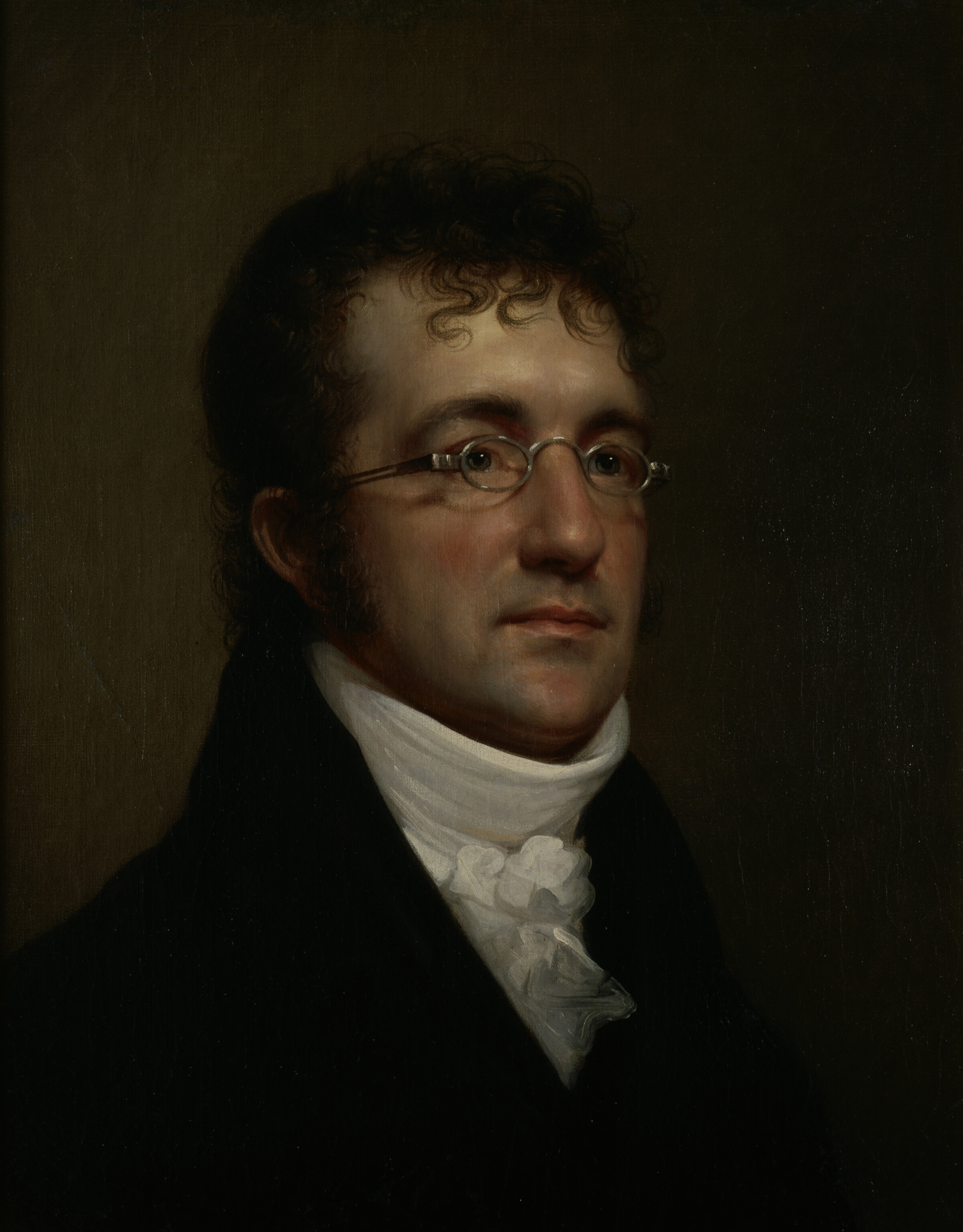
Benjamin Henry Latrobe, from Leeds, served as Architect of the Capitol in Washington D.C. from 1803 to 1817; he is regarded as the "father of American architecture".

- Jon Lancaster – racing driver
- Benjamin Henry Latrobe – neoclassical architect, best known for his design of the United States Capitol
- Samuel Ledgard – bus pioneer
- Aaron Lennon – footballer, started at Leeds United, now retired
- Matthew Lewis – actor, best known for his role as Neville Longbottom in the Harry Potter film series
- Gabby Logan – TV sports presenter; daughter of Terry Yorath, former Leeds Utd footballer and Wales Manager
- Sir Charles Lupton – Lord Mayor of Leeds 1915, co-founder of a law firm that became Dibb Lupton Alsop, (shortened to DLA), precursor to global law firm DLA Piper, with a prime office in Leeds
- Lupton family – prominent land-owning family of woollen cloth merchants and manufacturers in Georgian and Victorian Leeds through to the mid 20th century.

== M ==
- Owney Madden – Prohibition-era gangster
- Paul Madeley – footballer with 711 appearances for Leeds United 1964–80 in every position except goalkeeper
- Albert Mallinson (1870–1946) – composer and organist
- Alexandra Mardell (born 1993) – actress
- Henry Rowland Marsden – Liberal Mayor of Leeds 1873-1875
- Samuel Marsden (1764–1838) – The "Flogging Parson", magistrate of Parramatta, New South Wales; missionary to New Zealand
- Tim Marshall – Foreign Affairs Editor for Sky News, who has reported in a number of war zones
- Phil May – caricaturist
- Nell McAndrew – model; has appeared in Playboy magazine and was a contestant on I'm a Celebrity, Get Me Out of Here!
- Malcolm McDowell – actor; played the wizard in Just Visiting, starred in A Clockwork Orange, Caligula, and Star Trek Generations
- Sir Ian McGeechan – former rugby union player and coach; represented Scotland and the British and Irish Lions; currently chief executive of Leeds Carnegie
- Danny McGuire – rugby league player for Leeds Rhinos
- Michael McIlorum – rugby League footballer
- Edward McKenna – recipient of the Victoria Cross in 1863
- Frederick McNess – recipient of the Victoria Cross in 1916
- Scott McNiven – footballer who plays for Farsley Celtic
- Paul McShane – rugby league footballer who plays for the Leeds Rhinos
- Samuel Meekosha – recipient of the Victoria Cross in 1915
- Kay Mellor – writer of TV drama including Band of Gold
- Nigel Melville – rugby union player for Otley, Wakefield and Wasps; England Captain in 1980s (retired)
- Michael Middleton – father of the Catherine, Princess of Wales; grandfather of Prince George of Wales, Princess Charlotte of Wales and Prince Louis of Wales
- Trevor Midgley – Beau (folk singer/songwriter)
- Isaac Milner – 18th-century mathematician, abolitionist, inventor, and the President of Queens' College, Cambridge and Lucasian Professor of Mathematics
- James Milner – footballer currently playing for Brighton & Hove Albion
- Joseph Milner – 18th-century evangelical divine
- Nick Mohammed – actor, comedian, writer of including a number of hit sitcoms (e.g. Intelligence, Ted Lasso)
- James Roderick "Jim" Moir – comedian better known as Vic Reeves
- Angela Morley – composer (formerly known as Wally Stott)
- Adam Moran – Competitive Eater currently ranked #11 in Major League Eating's rankings
- Bryan Mosley – actor, 'Alf Roberts' in Coronation Street
- Albert Mountain – recipient of the Victoria Cross in 1918
- Chris Moyles – Radio X DJ
- Berkeley Moynihan, 1st Baron Moynihan – British Major-General of the First World War; surgeon
- Simon Musk – professional wrestler under the name El Ligero

== N ==
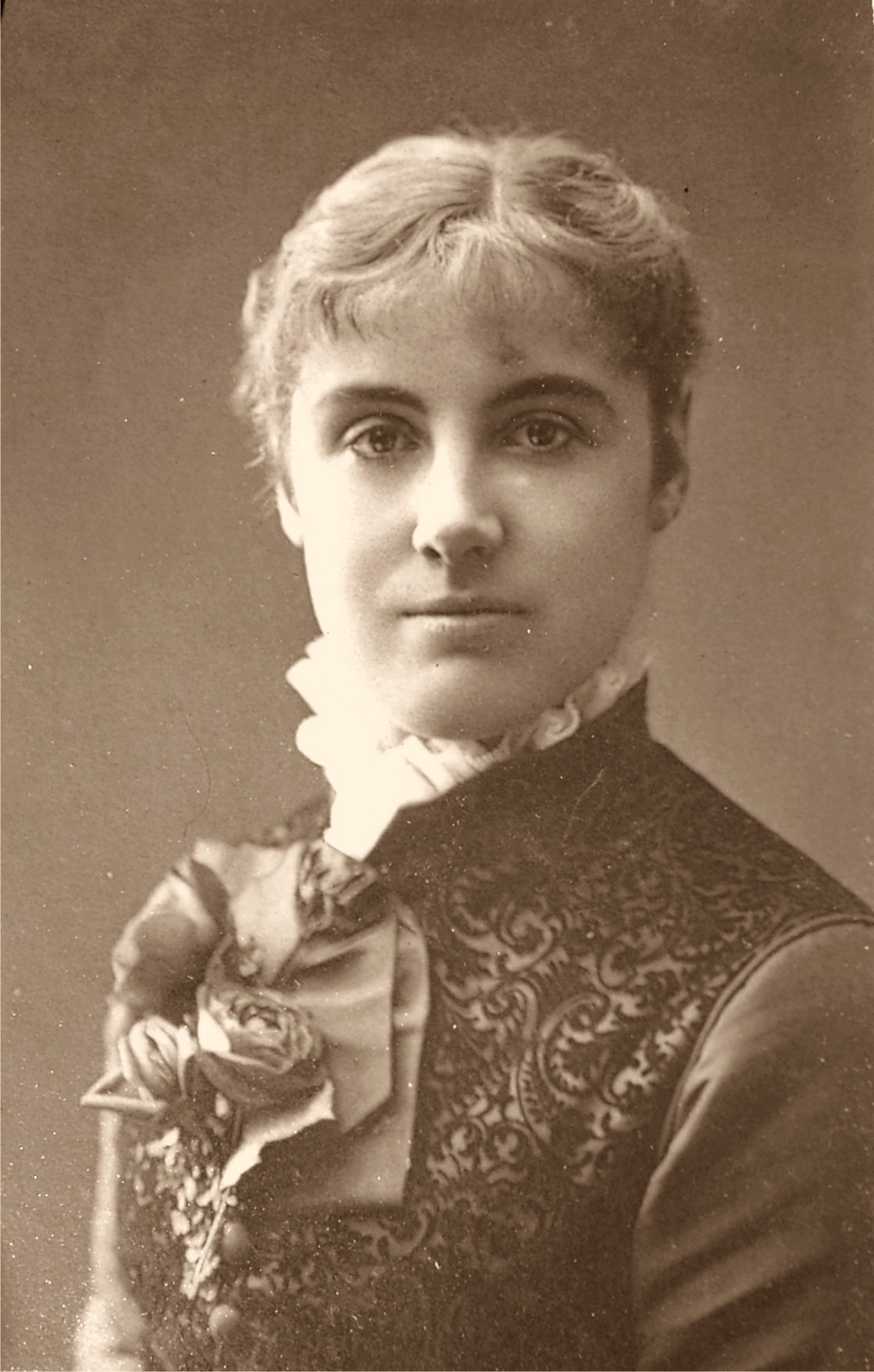
- Adelaide Neilson
  Philip Naviasky – artist
- Richard Naylor – retired footballer, currently coaching the Leeds United Academy
- Adelaide Neilson (real name Elizabeth Ann Brown) – Victorian actress

== O ==
- Richard Oastler – 19th-century reformer
- Jonathan Robert Ogden – 19th-century composer
- Michael O'Grady – former footballer who played for Leeds United and England between 1962 and 1969
- Thomas Osborne, 1st Duke of Leeds – 17th-century Whig statesman; a signatory of the Invitation to William
- Lucy Osburn – 19th-century nurse
- Peter O'Toole – acclaimed stage and screen actor

== P ==
- Joseph Arthur Padway – American Socialist politician, Wisconsin State Senate
- Jeremy Paxman – TV presenter
- Jamie Peacock – rugby league player, former Leeds Rhinos and Great Britain captain
- Billy Pearce – comedian (stand-up and pantomime)
- John Pearson – recipient of the Victoria Cross in 1858
- Bob Peck (1945–1999) – stage, film, TV and voiceover actor; attended Leeds Modern School, graduated from Leeds College of Art; acted for the Royal Shakespeare Company and the Royal National Theatre; starred in more than 20 TV dramas; known for Edge of Darkness, Jurassic Park
- David Pennett – former cricketer
- Adam Perry – drummer for the Bloodhound Gang
- Caryl Phillips – author, playwright
- Kalvin Phillips – footballer, who started his career at Leeds United and is currently with Manchester City.
- Gordon Pirie – middle-distance runner, silver medal winner in 5,000 metres, 1956 Olympics
- Tom Pidcock - Professional Cyclist - Mountain Bike - CycloCross - ProTour
- Joseph Priestley – 18th-century enlightenment theologian, dissenting clergyman, natural philosopher, chemist, educator, and political theorist who published over 150 works

== Q ==
- Bertha Quinn – suffragette, socialist, Labour councillor 1929–1943, recipient of Papal Bene Merenti Medal 1946

== R ==
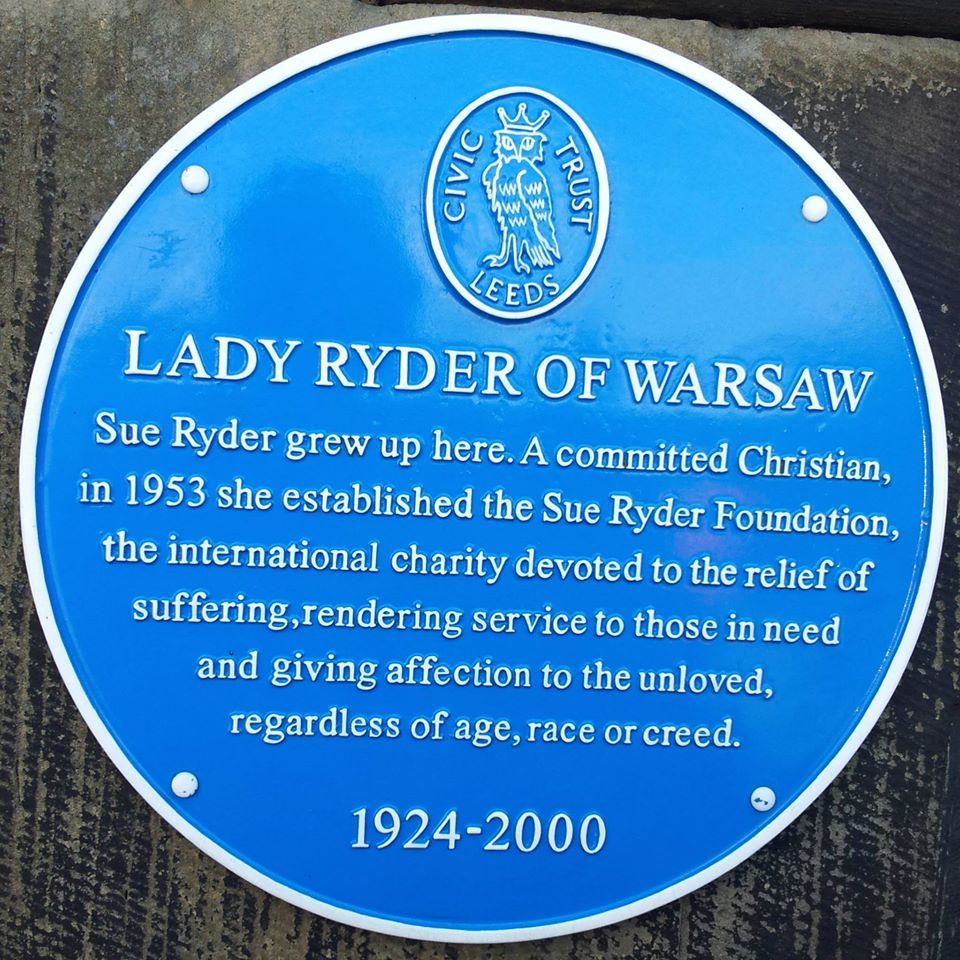
- Blue plaque dedicated to Sue Ryder
  Harry Ramsden – founder of Harry Ramsden's Fish and Chips chain
- Arthur Ransome – journalist and children's author (most notably Swallows and Amazons)
- Francis Rattenbury – architect who designed several well-known Canadian buildings
- Paul Reaney – footballer who played for Leeds United and England between 1962 and 1978; born in Fulham but grew up in Leeds
- Mike Redway – singer-songwriter, record producer, musician
- Andrew J. Richards astronomy professor and scientist
- Micah Richards – Former England footballer, now acting as a TV pundit. He played for Manchester City for 10 years coming through the youth ranks. He has won the Premiership, FA Cup and Carling Cup trophies. He attended Wetherby High School, Leeds but was born in Birmingham (when his mother was visiting relatives)
- Jason Robinson – rugby league player for Hunslet, Wigan and Great Britain; switched codes and played in 2003 World Cup for England; has since captained England Rugby Union
- Peter Robinson – crime novelist best known for his novels set in Yorkshire featuring Inspector Alan Banks
- Stella Rotenberg – poet and Shoah victim
- Katie Rushworth – television gardener on ITV's Love Your Garden
- Paul & Barry Ryan – pop-singing duo; Barry had a solo career after Paul withdrew to songwriting
- Sue Ryder – British peeress who worked with Special Operations Executive in the Second World War and afterwards led many charitable organizations, notably the Sue Ryder charity

== S ==
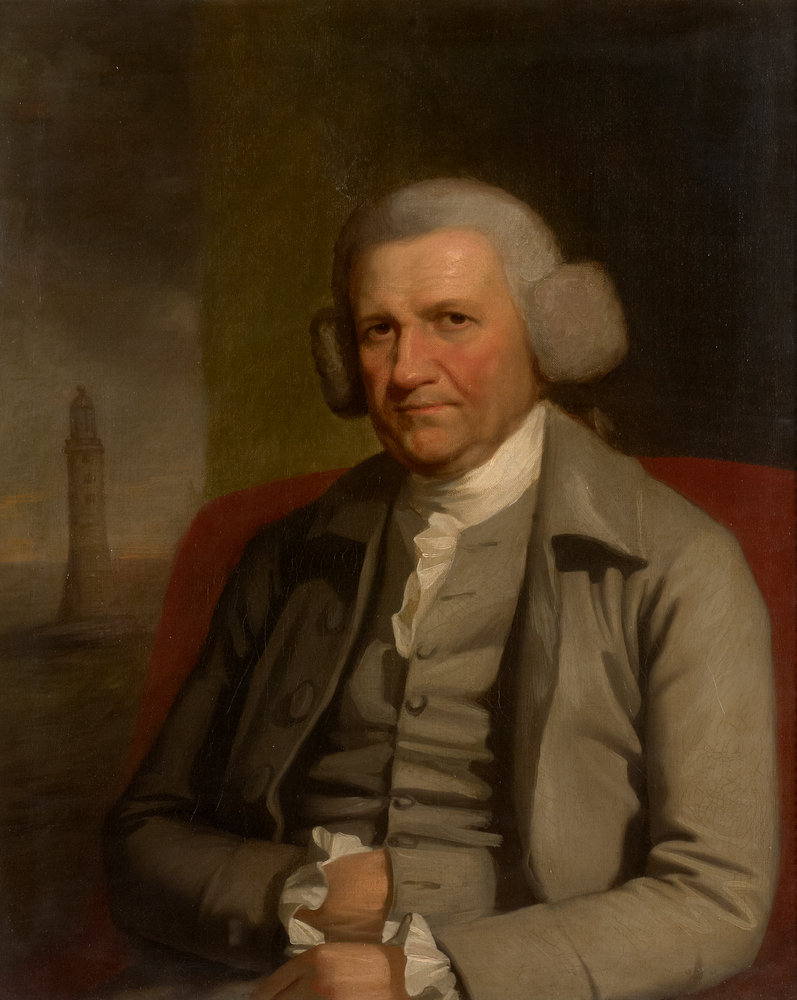
John Smeaton from Leeds, regarded as the "father of civil engineering"

- Sir Titus Salt, 1st Baronet – businessman and philanthropist, founder of Saltaire
- Lloyd Sam – footballer, currently playing for New York Red Bulls
- George Sanders – recipient of the Victoria Cross in 1916 and the Military Cross in 1918
- Jimmy Savile – DJ and TV presenter, Jim'll Fix It and Top of the Pops
- Garry Schofield – rugby league player, represented Great Britain and won the Rugby League Golden Boot
- Jack Shepherd – actor, starred as TV cop Wycliffe
- Paul Shepherd – ex-Leeds United player
- Mick Shoebottom – nicknamed "Shoey", was an English professional rugby league footballer who played in the 1960s and 1970s for Great Britain, England, Yorkshire and Leeds RL
- Florence Shufflebottom, circus performer
- John Simm – actor, Life on Mars and Doctor Who
- Esther Simpson – humanitarian and lobbyist who assisted hundreds of refugee academics during and after World War II
- Emile Sinclair – semi-professional footballer
- John Smeaton – civil engineer and physicist responsible for the design of bridges, canals, harbours and lighthouses throughout England
- Alan Smith – former Leeds United striker now retired
- Lee Smith – former London Wasps rugby union player, now playing for rugby league side Wakefield Trinity Wildcats
- Philip Stone – actor, Indiana Jones and the Temple of Doom, The Shining and A Clockwork Orange
- Marilyn Stowe – divorce lawyer and TV relationship expert
- Elsie Suddaby – a British lyric soprano known as "The Lass with the Delicate Air"
- Billy Sutcliffe – cricketer who captained Yorkshire
- Charles Stross – science fiction author

== T ==
- Tom Taiwo – footballer
- Barry Tebb (born 1942) – poet, novelist, editor, publisher and mental health campaigner
- Joshua Tetley (1778–1859) founder of the Tetley's Brewery in Leeds
- Charles Thackrah – pioneering surgeon in occupational medicine, a founder member of the Leeds School of Medicine; died of tuberculosis in 1833, at the age of 38
- Charles Thackray – pioneer of medical devices and instruments that led to modern hip replacement surgery
- Emma-Jean Thackray – jazz trumpeter, DJ, singer, composer and producer
- Jake Thackray – folk singer
- Jamie Thackray – rugby league player formerly of Leeds Rhinos
- Ralph Thoresby (1658–1724) – first historian of Leeds
- Sally Timms – singer with the band The Mekons
- Mike Tindall – England and Gloucester rugby union outside centre, from Otley
- Christopher Tolkien (1924–2020) – born in Leeds, the third son of the author J. R. R. Tolkien (1892–1973), and the editor of much of his father's posthumously published work.
- Jane Tomlinson – raised £1.75 million for cancer charities through endurance sports events after diagnosis of terminal breast cancer; died 3 September 2007
- Liz Truss – former Conservative prime minister of the United Kingdom, grew up in Leeds and attended Roundhay School.

== V ==
- Fred Verity – (1847–1897), engineer, inventor, iron founder, brass-founder, manufacturer and retailer of ironmongery
- Hedley Verity – England cricketer; playing for Yorkshire he took all 10 Nottinghamshire wickets for 10 runs on 12 July 1932
- Phil Venables – British computer scientist and security specialist
- Vesta Victoria – music-hall star

== W ==
- Chev Walker – English Rugby Union player for Bath RFC, formerly a professional rugby league footballer for Leeds Rhinos and Great Britain
- Charles Ward – recipient of the Victoria Cross in 1900
- Mickey Walker (golfer) – former Solheim Cup captain
- Stevie Ward – rugby league footballer who plays for the Leeds Rhinos
- Josh Warrington – former IBF featherweight boxing champion from 2018 to January 2021
- Keith Waterhouse – author of Billy Liar
- Fanny Waterman – international concert pianist; co-founder of the Leeds International Piano Competition
- Jordan Watson – kickboxer
- Frank Atha Westbury (1838–1901) – author of mystery adventure novels, children's stories and poetry in late 19th-century Australia and New Zealand
- Noel Whelan – footballer who played for Leeds United, Coventry City and Middlesbrough F.C.
- Aidan White – footballer who played for Leeds United. Now plays for Heart of Midlothian
- Craig White – cricketer who captained Yorkshire
- Jack White (born Jacob Weiss) – recipient of the Victoria Cross in 1917
- Marco Pierre White – celebrity chef and restaurateur
- Sir Denys Wilkinson – nuclear physicist
- John Grimshaw Wilkinson – visually impaired botanist
- Tom Wilkinson – actor, Batman Begins, Eternal Sunshine of the Spotless Mind and The Full Monty
- Geoffrey Wilson – cricketer who captained Yorkshire
- Ernie Wise (real name Ernest Wiseman) – of the comedy duo Morecambe and Wise
- Frank Wormald – British army officer, served in the Second Boer War and First World War, earned the rank of Brigadier General, died leading troops on the Western Front
- Stevie Wright – The Easybeats frontman born in Leeds but emigrated to Australia

== Z ==
- Alex Zane – TV presenter and DJ

== See also ==
- List of people from West Yorkshire
