= Andrew Richards =

Andrew Richards may refer to:

- Andrew J. Richards (born 1955), British professor of astronomy
- Andrew Richards (died 1877), black man lynched in Winchester, Illinois, see lynching of Andrew Richards
- Andy Richards (born 1952), English pianist, composer, music producer and keyboardist
