= Ann Hanson =

Ann(e) Hanson or Hansen may refer to:

- Ann Meekitjuk Hanson (born 1946), commissioner of Nunavut
- Ann-Louise Hanson (born 1944), Swedish singer
- Ann Ellis Hanson, American papyrologist and historian
- Anne Coffin Hanson (1921–2004), American art historian
- Ann Hansen (born 1953), Canadian anarchist
- Anne Lena Hansen (born 1974), Norwegian model
- Anne Lyon Hansen, English nurse
- Anne Mette Hansen (born 1994), Danish handball player

== See also ==
- Anna Hansen, Canadian-born chef
- Anna Sunadóttir Hansen (born 1998), Faroese footballer
- Anni Hammergaard Hansen (1930–2000), Danish badminton player
