= Volleyball at the 2015 Island Games =

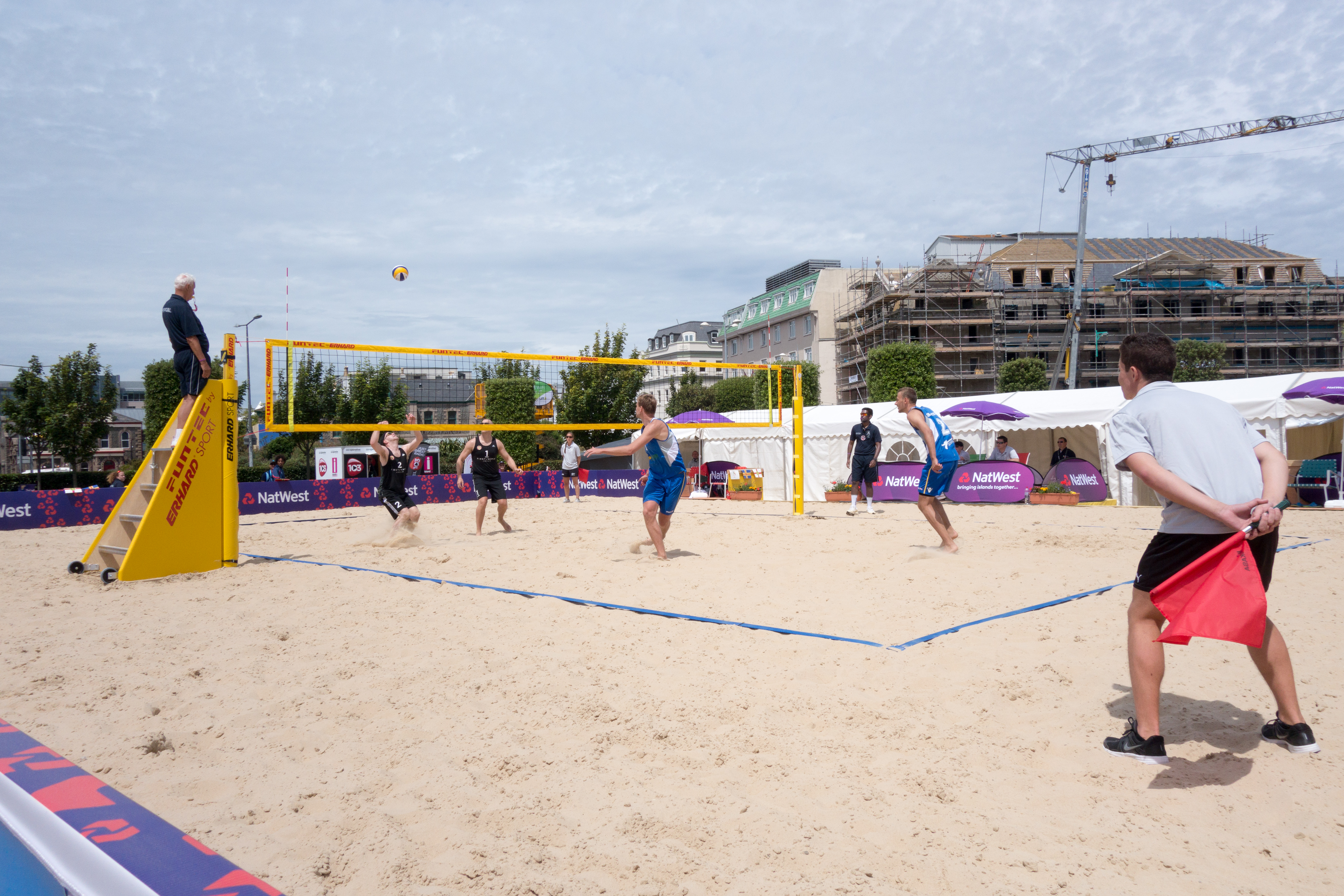
Men's beach volleyball at the 2015 Island Games

Volleyball, for the 2015 Island Games, took place indoors at the Queen's Hall which is located at Fort Regent, and outside at Weighbridge Place in Saint Helier.

== Medal table ==
| Rank | Nation | Gold | Silver | Bronze | Total |
|---|---|---|---|---|---|
| 1 | Saare County | 2 | 0 | 0 | 2 |
| 2 | Faroe Islands (FRO) | 0 | 2 | 0 | 2 |
| 3 | Menorca (Menorca) | 0 | 0 | 1 | 1 |
| 3 | Åland (ALA) | 0 | 0 | 1 | 1 |
| Totals (4 entries) | | 2 | 2 | 2 | 6 |

== Events ==
| Event | Gold | Silver | Bronze |
|---|---|---|---|
| Men | Saare County; Egert Ader; Karel Ellermaa; Helar Jalg; Cris-Karlis Lepp; Kaimar Lomp; Siim Põlluäär; Taavi Prei; Mihkel Tanila; Tom Tom; Villu Vahter | Faroe Islands; Thorvald Danielsen; John Olivar Edvardsson; Bjarki Enni; Jógvan Eli Annfinsson Fagraklett; Trygvi Hansen; Rói Hentze; Bardur Jacobsen; Bjarni Larsen; Bogi Midjord; Bergur Olsen; Steffan Rosenlund Olsen; Suni Juul Pedersen; Rasmus Mortensen Potts; Brian Kærsgård Poulsen; Jóhan Arne Eliasson Wang; Oskar í Haraldstovu Weihe | Åland Islands; Fredrick Boman; Mikael Donning; Christoffer Eriksson; Oskar Flodin; Johan Lindström; Edvard Nordlund; Jacob Nordlund; Tobias Nordlund; Verneri Vetriö; Jonas Witting |
| Women | Saare County; Maali Kanemägi; Gerda Kaubi; Janet Lõbus; Kadi Mägi; Kaia Mägi; Kaisa Õunpuu; Mari Peeters; Eliisa Peit; Nette Peit; Kristi Põld; Raili Sepp; Krista Vahter | Faroe Islands; Anja Danielsen; Karina Poulsdóttir Debes; Birgit Guttesen; Anna Sunadóttir Hansen; Birita Joensen; Guðrun Simona Lindenskov Joensen; Eina Stephania Kalsø; Eyð Guðrunsdóttir Magnussen; Femja Fróðadóttir Mortensen; Eva Winther Nagata; Sóley Mørch Poulsen; Elisabeth Purkhús; Sofía Purkhús; Jastrið Sivertsen; Urd Tormóðsdóttir Traðará | Menorca; Esther Bermejo Gener; Marina Faner Bagur; Mria Jofre Guasch; Júlia LLiufriu Roman; Agnès Melià Febrer; Roser Olives Casanovas; Beatriz Pons Benavides; Aïda Riudavets Carreras; Valentina Stenta |
