= Drumsing =

Austrian musical duo

- Origin: Linz, Austria
- Genres: Pop, Latin American music
- Years active: 2008–present
- Label: Independent
- Members: Andrew Edge; Judy Klausner

Drumsing is a duo of musicians featuring Andrew Edge and Josef 'Judy' Klausner. The duo perform with percussion and vocals, and no other musical instruments. Drumsing was formed in Linz, Austria, in 2008. It took two years to write songs and record their first CD, which was released in Austria, in 2011.

== Background ==
Edge is a musician from Leeds, England. After playing in local bands, he moved to London in the late 1970s, and joined the Thompson Twins. After one year Edge left the group and joined Uropa Lula (with singer David Lloyd), who released three singles (on Arista Records) and later supported Big Country on a tour of Britain. Edge then joined Savage Progress, who supported the Thompson Twins on a tour of Britain in 1984, and in the same year embarked on a tour of Germany, Switzerland and Austria, to support their album and single releases there. Edge moved to Linz, Austria in the late 1980s, forming the band YOYO; signing a record contract with EMI records in Vienna. Edge later worked with Robert Ponger, who was the former producer of Falco. Edge's collaboration with Ponger lasted three years, although Edge only used two songs (from 12 demo songs) for his solo CD on BMG records (Austria) called Northern Sky (1996).

Klausner was born in Linz, Austria, and in 1987 took classes in African and Brazilian music at the ISP (International School of Percussion) in Munich, Germany. He later studied under Nippy Noya, from Amsterdam, and Karl Potter (USA), and participated in a masterclass with Billy Cobham, in Germany. In 1990, he travelled for the first time to Havana, Cuba, and attended the Ignacio Cervantes music school. In 1994, he played a concert in the Netherlands with Dutch percussionist Martin Verdonk, and Armando Peraza (from Carlos Santana's Band). Klausner also works with flamenco guitarist Stefan Brixel, playing concerts across Europe. He also works with his own formations, known as Judy Klausner & Friends, as well as holding regular percussion workshops.

== Formation ==
"Talking All The Time"
Sample of the single "Talking All The Time" by Drumsing

Edge first met Austrian-born Klausner when he moved to Austria in the late 1980s. They worked sporadically together in various formats, until deciding to record a CD that would feature purely percussion instruments and vocals. Klausner then recorded various South American rhythms at the CCP studio in Linz, with Claus Prellinger as engineer. Edge later composed songs over the basic tracks, but all the melodies had to follow the tuning of the congas and percussion.
