= Rakul =

Rakul is a given name. Notable people with the name include:

- Rakul Magnussen (born 1988), Faroese footballer
- Rakul Preet Singh (born 1990), Indian actress
