= Savage Progress =

English pop band

- Origin: London
- Genres: Pop, dance, synthpop
- Years active: 1982–1985
- Label: 10 Records/Virgin Records
- Past members: Glynnis (voc); Rik Kenton (bs); Ned Morant (perc); Carol Isaacs (key); Andrew Edge (dr)

Savage Progress were an English pop group in the 1980s that had hits in Germany, Austria and Switzerland. The band was founded by Rik Kenton (b. 31 October 1945, in Nottingham, Nottinghamshire, England) Glynnis (voc) Ned Morant (perc.) Carol Isaacs (keyboards/background vocals) and Andrew Edge (drums). They were a mixed-race group of musicians who used traditional pop styles as well as reggae, Caribbean dance rhythms and African rhythms.

Savage Progress joined the Thompson Twins on the "Into the Gap" tour of Britain (February 1984) as support act. Savage Progress' biggest hit was "My Soul Unwraps Tonight", which was written by Kenton, a former member of Roxy Music.

== Early years ==
The band started with the meeting of Kenton and Glynnis in 1982. They later recruited Morant, who was not a professional percussionist, but was eager to learn and fitted in with the visual style of the band. They recorded a few basic demos over Christmas in 1982, at The Point studio in Victoria, London, with a young tape operator called Danny Hyde, who used the free time he was allowed by the studio to record four basic tracks. At that time the Point studio was under the control of Rupert Merton, who owned the Point Music publishing company. After hearing their demos he asked them to record more songs. Merton was then the Thompson Twins publisher, and later signed Freur/Underworld.

As Savage Progress had no drummer at that time, they invited Edge to join. Edge had rehearsed in The Point studio a few years before with the Thompson Twins, and was a friend of Alex Burak, the chief engineer. Edge had previously played with David Lloyd in Uropa Lula, and later introduced Isaacs to Savage Progress, as they had both previously worked together in Uropa Lula, which had been signed to Arista records the previous year.

=== Racial mix ===
The racial mix within Savage Progress was never fully stressed in the media, but had a definite effect on their music: Glynnis was born in Zimbabwe to mixed race/African parents, Kenton is from Nottingham, Isaacs is English-Jewish, Morant has Indian parentage, and Edge is from Leeds, in northern England. This mix of differing cultures proved to be advantageous for Savage Progress' music, as Kenton infused their songs with as many cultural influences as possible. Larry Heard commented on his early influences, which include the Savage Progress song, "Heart Begin To Beat".

=== Recording contract ===
After signing a publishing contract with Point Music, the band signed a contract with 10 Records (a subsidiary of Virgin Records) and released their first single, "My Soul Unwraps Tonight". It became a medium hit in Germany peaking at #14 in July 1984. The first album, Celebration, was partly produced by Paul "Wix" Wickens, who plays keyboards for Paul McCartney.

=== Touring ===
Savage Progress supported Tina Turner at The Venue in Victoria, London, and joined the Thompson Twins on the "Into The Gap" tour of Britain (1984) as support act: 21 February 1984, Goldiggers, Chippenham/22, Apollo, Oxford/23, The Leisure Centre, Hereford/24-25, Brighton Conference Centre, Brighton/26-27, Colston Hall, Bristol/28, Coliseum, St. Austell/29, Arts Centre, Dorchester/2-3-4-5–6 March 1984, Hammersmith Odeon, London/8, Sheffield City Hall/9, Newcastle City Hall/10, Glasgow Apollo, Glasgow/11-12, Edinburgh Playhouse/13-14, Royal Concert Hall, Nottingham/15, Royal Court Theatre, Liverpool/16, Manchester Apollo/17-18, Birmingham Odeon, Birmingham/19, De Montfort Hall, Leicester/25, Birmingham Odeon/26-27, Hammersmith Palais.

In October of the same year they went on a tour of Germany, Austria and Switzerland, to capitalize on the success of their single releases.

=== Session musicians ===
Keyboarder Steve French had earlier worked with Haircut One Hundred, and played keyboards for Savage Progress on the Thompson Twins Mind The Gap tour in February 1984, and after Savage Progress he worked with Tom Robinson and numerous other artists. Edge left shortly after the Thompson Twins tour, but was asked back to play on the European tour in October 1984. During his absence, drummer Stuart Elliot (previously with Steve Harley & Cockney Rebel) played drums with the band for a John Peel session on 18 July 1984, and also played on the song, "Ball and Chain", for their first album, Celebration. Neil Conti—from Prefab Sprout—played drums with them during the summer of 1984, before Edge was asked to rejoin. Mark Ferda played guitar with them on their European tour, and later worked with Jah Wobble, Bill Laswell, Brian Eno, and The Wolfgang Press.

=== Lyrics ===
Kenton avoided normal topics and styles when writing lyrics, such as on, "My Souls Unwraps Tonight":

"Suddenly there come a time lately, I'm my own little one / With my spear and my shield, democratically won / Suddenly in summertime baby, when your fire starts to burn / I can turn, I can turn, your disaster to fun / Hey, Hey, My Soul Unwraps Tonight"

=== The end ===
Glynnis left the band after their tour of Europe in October 1984. The band were offered the chance to play European festivals in the summer of 1985 (with another singer) but Kenton declined and broke up the band. The remaining members played together as a backing band for other artists, but never re-formed using the original name.

== Before Savage Progress ==
After Roxy Music, Kenton recorded Bungalow Love in 1974 for Island Records (1974 /UK Island 7 Inch, WIP6214). In 1976 Kenton recorded "The Libertine/Messin' Around" (7" single) (UK) EMI/EMI 2443. His band members for the recording included Chris Spedding/guitars, Jim Cregan/guitars, Herbie Flowers/bass, and Tony Newman/drums.

Glynnis had sung backing vocals with a reggae band, lead vocals in a punk band she had formed with her sister. Called 'The Max Factor ' their debut gig was at Toyah Willcox' 21st Birthday party. Morant had had various jobs, including inoculating chickens. Edge had played with the Thompson Twins, and Viva Lula, as well as drumming for various artists.

== After Savage Progress ==
Kenton worked with Bassomatic on one track of Set the Controls for the Heart of the Bass in 1990, but has not released any solo material. Carol Isaacs went on to work with many other artists, such as Sinéad O'Connor, Sam Brown, Squeeze, and the Indigo Girls. Edge moved to Austria to start a singing career, signing with his band YOYO EMI and later, BMG (as a solo artist), singing on various recordings, but is now working with Drumsing. Morant has worked with other bands, such as The 4 Of Us, Alabama 3, and Anne Clark. Guitarist Ferda later formed a duo with Glynnis after she left the band. Called 'Angel Chorus' they landed a recording deal with Virgin 10 Records and released a single, "Devil on my shoulder", produced by Zeus B. Held. Glynnis has since changed her name to Urtema Dolphin and now runs a successful practice incorporating sound and voice in her work as sound healer /spiritual teacher based in London. She has one son, Marlon (born 2 February 1995).

== Discography ==
=== Albums ===
- Celebration (LP), 10 Records (UK) (1984)

=== Singles ===
- "My Soul Unwraps Tonight" (7"), Virgin Records (Germany) (1984)
- "Burning Bush" (7"), 10 Records (UK) (1984)
- "Heart Begin to Beat" (7"), 10 Records (UK) (1984)

=== Compilation appearances ===
- Hit-News (LP) - "My Soul Unwraps Tonight" – K-Tel International GmbH (1984)
- Megamix Vol. 1 (2xLP) - "My Soul Unwraps Tonight" – Virgin Scandinavia AB (1984)
- Megamix Vol. 2 (2xLP) - "Burning Bush (Testify)" – Virgin Scandinavia AB (1984)
- Super 20 Hit-Sensation (LP) - "Heart Begin to Beat" – Ariola (Germany) (1984)
- The Best of 1980 – 1990 Vol. 6 (2xCD) - "My Soul Unwraps Tonight" – EMI Electrola GmbH (1992)
