= Listed buildings in Leeds (Middleton Park Ward) =

Middleton Park is a ward in the metropolitan borough of the City of Leeds, West Yorkshire, England. It contains 13 listed buildings that are recorded in the National Heritage List for England. All the listed buildings are designated at Grade II, the lowest of the three grades, which is applied to "buildings of national importance and special interest". The ward contains suburbs to the south of the centre of Leeds, including the former village of Middleton and Belle Isle. The listed buildings consist of a house and associated outbuildings, a row of cottages, a church and associated structures, buildings in Hunslet Cemetery, and a group of almshouses and associated structures.

== Buildings ==
Name and location	Photograph	Date	Notes
Ebor House; 53.76130°N 1.52340°W	—	Mid 18th century	The house is in brown brick with a hipped stone slate roof. There are two storeys and three bays, the wider middle projecting under a pediment. In the centre is a doorway with a fanlight and a pediment. To the left is a bay window, with a segmental-arched casement window above, and a round-headed window in the pediment, and the other windows are sashes.
Outbuildings, Ebor House; 53.76133°N 1.52298°W	—	18th century	The outbuildings to the east of the house consist of former stables and sheds in brown brick with a stone slate roof. There is a single storey and a lean-to roof against a wall. The buildings contain doorways and wide windows.
Top-of-the-Town Cottages; 53.75056°N 1.54990°W		Mid 18th century	A row of cottages that was later altered and extended. It is in red brick with a roof partly in stone slate and partly in slate. There are two storeys, and seven upper floor windows. The doorways have plain surrounds, and the windows are sashes, those in the ground floor with segmental heads.
St Mary's Church; 53.75195°N 1.54323°W		1845–46	The church was designed by R. D. Chantrell in Early English style, and is in stone with a slate roof. It consists of a nave, north and south aisles, a chancel and a west tower. The tower has three stages, a porch with a moulded surround, angle buttresses, and an embattled parapet. The windows are lancets.
Lych gate and walls, St Mary's Church; 53.75147°N 1.54287°W		1846 (probable)	The lych gate at the entrance to the churchyard was designed by R. D. Chantrell, it is in stone, and has a stone slate roof with coped gables and cross finials. The lych gate is in Gothic Revival style, and contains an arch with a moulded surround, paired attached columns and a hood mould. The flanking walls have pointed coping, they are about 5 metres (16 ft) long, and the end piers have shallow pyramidal caps.
Hunslet Cemetery Chapels; 53.76877°N 1.52342°W		Mid 19th century	The chapels near the entrance to the cemetery form one building in gritstone that has a slate roof with coped gables. It is in Neo-Norman style. There are paired entrances on the east side in a gabled porch with corner buttresses, round-headed arches, paired attached columns, a stepped hood mould, and a round window in the gable. The main entrances are in the north and south ends, with round-arched doorways, and above are gabled bellcotes. The windows are round-headed with attached columns, between them are pilasters, and there are moulded sills and a corbel table. On the west side is a memorial stone in pink and grey polished granite.
Lodges, gate piers, gates and walls, Hunslet Cemetery; 53.76878°N 1.52388°W		Mid 19th century	The lodges, gate piers, and walls are in gritstone. The lodges are in Tudor style, with a single storey, and slate roofs with moulded gables and tall octagonal chimneys. They contain doorways with plain surrounds and mullioned and transomed windows, and each lodge has a canted bay window. The flanking walls contain small outbuildings and doorways with Gothic arches. The inner and outer gate piers are tall and square with plinths and gabled capstones, and the gates are in wrought iron.
Memorial, Hunslet Cemetery; 53.76799°N 1.52116°W	—	1885	The memorial is to six women who died in an accident in a cut nail works. It is in stone and about 4 metres (13 ft) high. The memorial has a three-stage base, a plinth, a tapering shaft, a band with paterae, and a pedimented capstone surmounted by a kneeling draped female figure. On the shaft is an inscription.
1, 2 and 3 Scott's Almshouses; 53.76967°N 1.52341°W		1896	A row of three almshouses in red brick with stone dressings, a parapet over the ground floor, and a slate roof that has gables with moulded copings and ball and vase finials. There are two storeys and five bays. The recessed porches have a central column and the doorways have fanlights. The windows are cross windows, and there are three gabled pediments. On the left return is a three-light bay window, above which is an inscribed plaque with a segmental pediment.
4–7 Scott's Almshouses; 53.76953°N 1.52320°W		1896	A row of four almshouses in red brick with stone dressings, a parapet over the ground floor, and a slate roof that has gables with moulded copings and ball and vase finials. There are two storeys and four bays. In the ground floor are four bay windows, between which are recessed porches, the middle porch with a central column. The outer bays of the upper floor have round-arched sash windows with pediments on brackets. In the inner bays are two-light windows with ornate gabled pediments above.
8, 9 and 10 Scott's Almshouses; 53.76944°N 1.52347°W		1896	A row of three almshouses in red brick with stone dressings, a parapet over the ground floor, and a slate roof that has gables with moulded copings and ball and vase finials. There are two storeys and five bays. The recessed porches have a central column and the doorways have fanlights. The windows are cross windows, and there are three gabled pediments. On the right return is a three-light bay window, above which is an inscribed plaque with a segmental pediment.
Wall and gate piers, Scott's Almshouses; 53.76954°N 1.52364°W		c. 1896	The boundary wall is in red brick with stone coping, about 1 metre (3 ft 3 in) high, and with an overall length of about 50 metres (160 ft). In the centre is a double gateway with three square stone piers, about 2 metres (6 ft 7 in) high, with moulded capstones.
Bust of John Scott, Scott's Almshouses; 53.76954°N 1.52340°W		c. 1896	The bust is of John Scott, the founder of Scott's Almshouses, and stands in the courtyard of the buildings. The bust is in marble with a moulded circular base, and the rest is in gritstone. This consists of a stepped square base, a lower plinth with fluted pilasters and a brass plaque, and an upper plinth with chamfered edges.
