= A Broad Abroad =

Adventure travel webseries

A Broad Abroad is an adventure travel webseries on Yahoo! Travel hosted by Paula Froelich which launched on September 8, 2014. The 5-minute videos follow Froelich to destinations on every continent where she interviews local residents to learn about their unique culture.

== Paula Froelich ==
The host of A Broad Abroad, Froelich is an author, journalist, and traveler. Froelich became the editor-in-chief of Yahoo! Travel in April 2013. Prior to this assignment, she spent ten years (1999-2009) as deputy editor of the New York Post’s celebrity entertainment column, Page Six. During her tenure there, she was a correspondent for Entertainment Tonight and The Insider, and appeared as a guest on The View, Real Time with Bill Maher, The Today Show, and Good Morning America.

Froelich is The New York Times best-selling author of the novel Mercury In Retrograde. She won a Gold Medal from the North American Travel Journalists Association for her Playboy article, “Down And Out In Baghdad” in January 2012. She also helped the Sundance Channel win a CableFax award in the Integrated Marketing Campaign Category.

== A Broad Abroad ==
Six months after Froelich joined Yahoo! Travel as editor-in-chief, she began producing A Broad Abroad, a female-hosted travel adventure internet series. Her advice to other females who wish to travel is "Just do it. Find what you are good at. Find what you love. Then, just go."

Froelich's travels on A Broad Abroad have focused on the Australian Outback salt lakes, Greenland's fjords, Mexico's baking traditions, and Leeds, England, her childhood home, amongst other international destinations. She opens each episode by saying "Take a journey with me to explore the unknown, and discover the unexpected." The series won the 2014 Silver Award for travel broadcast from the North American Travel Journalists Association.

== Yahoo! Travel ==
Yahoo! website's Yahoo! Travel section offers travel guides, daily articles, booking and reservation services. Categories for travel research include "Cruise", "Eat", "Adventure", "Road Trip", "Romance", "Family", and "Solo". Yahoo! Travel has six employees and receives its revenue through advertisements and sponsorships. It is the second most-visited American travel website, after TripAdvisor and before USAToday Travel.
