= Richard Beck =

Richard Beck may refer to:

- Richard Beck (rugby union) (born 1989), English rugby union player
- Richard Beck (scholar) (1897–1980), American literary historian
- Rick Beck (born 1956), member of the Arkansas House of Representatives
- Rich Beck (born 1940), former Major League Baseball pitcher
- Richard Beck (author), American journalist and author

== See also ==
- The Rape of Richard Beck, a 1985 American television movie
