= Belle Isle, Leeds =

Large suburb 3 mi south of Leeds city centre, West Yorkshire, England

Coordinates: 53.7641°N 1.5278°W

Belle Isle
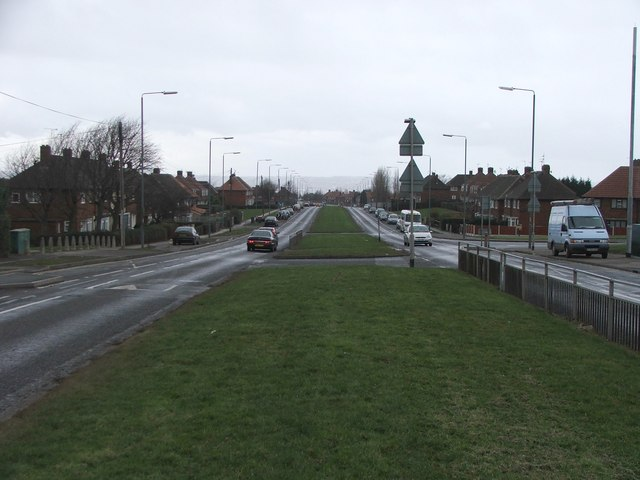
- Belle Isle Road

- Location within West Yorkshire
- OS grid reference: SE3129
- Metropolitan borough: City of Leeds
- Metropolitan county: West Yorkshire
- Region: Yorkshire and the Humber
- Country: England
- Sovereign state: United Kingdom
- Post town: LEEDS
- Postcode district: LS10
- Dialling code: 0113
- Police: West Yorkshire
- Fire: West Yorkshire
- Ambulance: Yorkshire
- UK Parliament: Leeds South

Belle Isle is a large suburb 3 miles (5 km) south of Leeds city centre, West Yorkshire, England. It is bounded to the north and east by the M621 motorway.

The district lies in the LS10 Leeds postcode area. Belle Isle is part of the Middleton Park ward of Leeds City Council and Leeds South parliamentary constituency.

== Etymology ==
The name "Belle Isle" is first attested in the Rothwell parish register for 1762 as Newbell-ile, and then in 1763 as Belle Isle, situated at Middleton Wood End. The name is borrowed from that of the French island Belle Île, off the Breton coast, whose name is French for 'beautiful island'. The island was captured and held by British forces from 1761 to 1763 during the Seven Years' War, and this event inspired the naming of the Yorkshire settlement. There is also speculation that the name might be a pun on the place-name Bell Hill (which allegedly derives from the distinctive "bell" shaped early coal mining bell pits of the hilly area).

== History ==
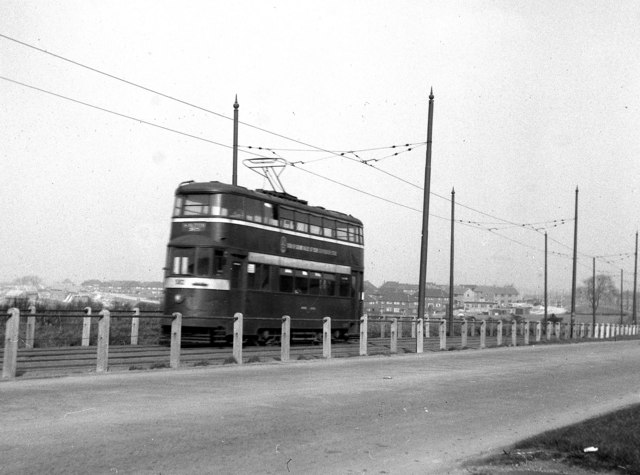
Belle Isle had its own tram link to the city centre which in 1949 was linked to the Middleton arm, creating a circular tramway largely segregated from other traffic.

In the late eighteenth century, Belle Isle was just a small hamlet for workers at a colliery opposite Middleton Woods, near the current site of Middleton colliery railway.

Belle Isle now consists largely of housing estates built on farming land by the local authority housing department during the clearance of slum dwellings and the expansion of Leeds in the early twentieth-century; some of these homes are now in private ownership.

The estate is divided north to south by Belle Isle Road with the wide expanse of Belle Isle Circus lying at the centre of the estate.

The majority of the homes in Belle Isle are red brick semi-detached houses although this stock has been added to over the years. The majority still belong to Leeds City Council and are managed locally by Belle Isle Tenant Management Organisation (TMO). BITMO is a not for profit housing company that is run by a tenant board.

Some of the council estates of Belle Isle are listed below:

- Petersfield Avenue
- Windmill Road
- The Clearings
- Manor Farms (often debated as to whether this lies in Middleton)
- Newhall Road
- The Brooms
- The Aberfields
- The Lanshaws
- The Nesfields

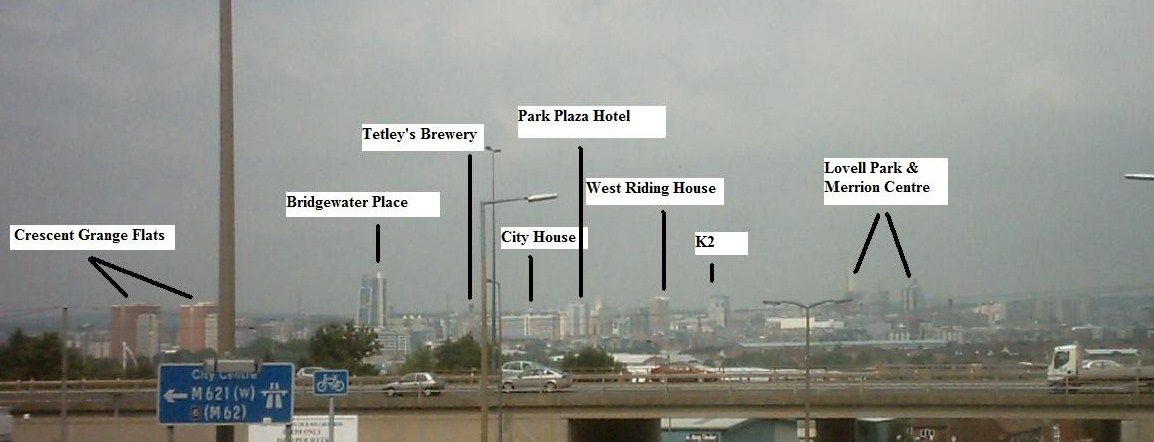
A view of central Leeds from Belle Isle Road

== Demography ==
Like the neighbouring communities of Beeston Hill, Holbeck and Middleton, Belle Isle is considered to be amongst the most deprived areas in the country. Examples of disadvantage found in the district include low educational attainment, low skill levels, and concerns about crime, anti-social behaviour and lack of facilities.

In 2010 the Middleton Park ward which includes Belle Isle had 27487 inhabitants of which 52.2% were female and 47.8% male and 21.5% were aged 15 or under compared with an England average of 18.7%. Life Expectancy for males and females is more than three years less than the rest of Leeds. In 2001, most residents, 96.3%, identified as White British with 71.6% identifying as Christian and over 18% having no religion. Most houses are in the Council Tax Bands A and B. In April 2012, 1493 people were claiming Jobseekers allowance which at 8.3% was nearly double the Leeds' average. While all recorded crime was below the Leeds' average, criminal damage was substantially higher and nearly twice the England average.

In the Middleton Park ward in 2001, there were 10,649 households of which 1,201 households with dependent children had and no adult in employment. Of the 1,410 of lone parent households with dependent children, most, 1,307 were women and most had no job. Male lone parents numbered 95 of which 39 were in full-time employment. Nearly half the households, 5,170 had no car or van.

== Education ==
Belle Isle has a number of schools. Merlyn Rees Community High School, situated at the heart of Belle Isle, provided educational facilities for over 20 years (previously known as Belle Isle Middle School), but, in late 2006, the school closed down. Merlyn Rees then changed its name to South Leeds High School. It was then demolished and is now situated near South Leeds Sports centre. In 2009 the school was renamed South Leeds Academy.

Other schools in the area are Windmill Primary School (previously known as Belle Isle Primary School) opposite Merlyn Rees School, and Clapgate Primary School on Cranmore Drive. Also, Sharp Lane Primary School is located near the Omnibus Pub. Broomfield SILC - Specialist Inclusive Learning Centre, an all-age generic special school is on the Broom estate.

== Religion ==
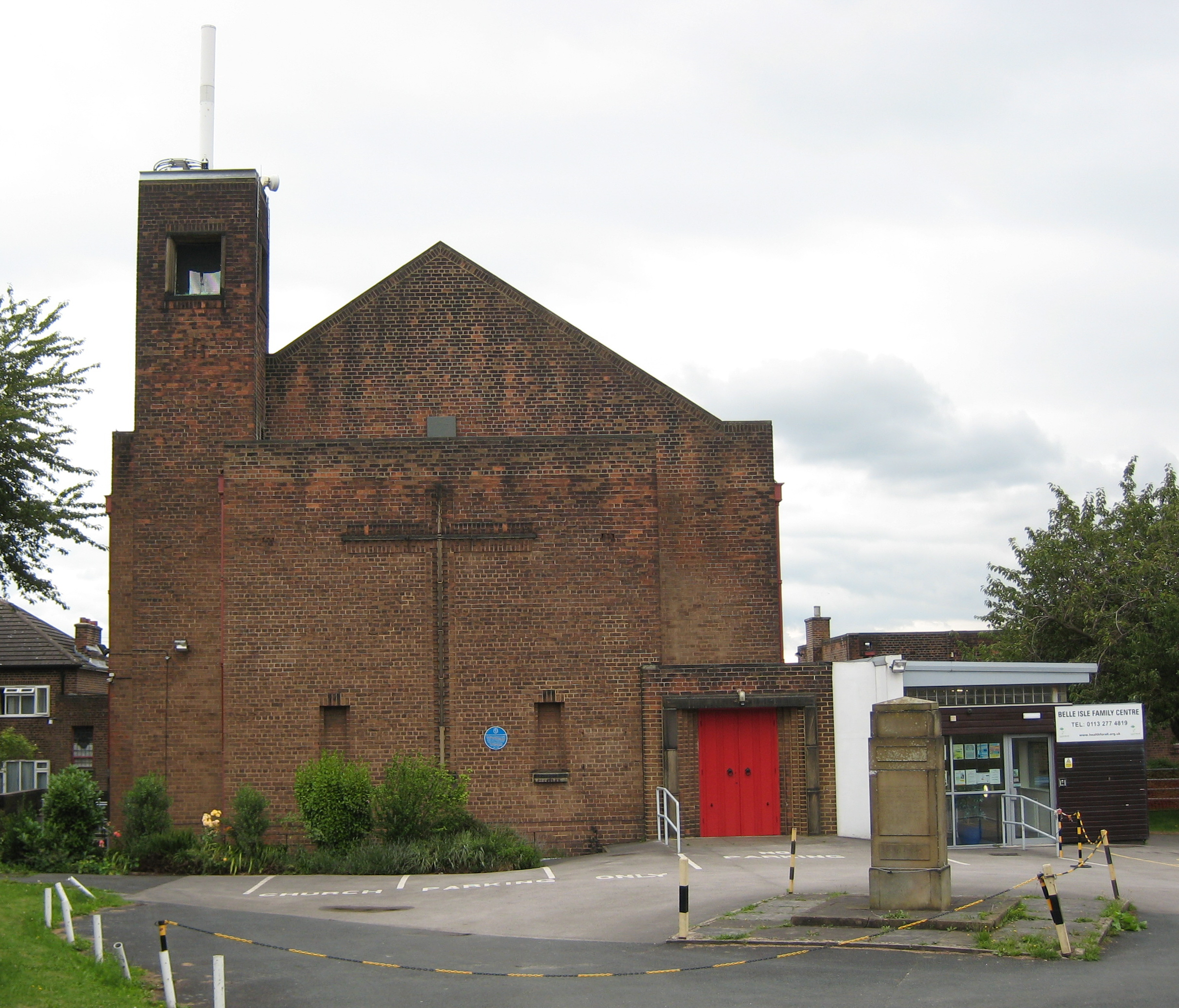
St John and St Barnabas Church

The churches of St John and St Barnabas (Anglican), West Grange (Evangelical) and St Peter (Roman Catholic) serve the area. The United Reformed Church in South Leeds was built in 2011 on the site of a Congregational Church opened in 1952 on Nesfield Road.

== Entertainment ==
It is the site of the popular Belle Isle Working Men's Club, which hosted many regional and national stars during the 1970s club boom. The club burnt to the ground in 2000 but was subsequently rebuilt.

== Notable people ==
The television presenter and model, Nell McAndrew, is from Belle Isle. The England international rugby league players Garry Schofield, Jason Robinson and Sonny Nickle, Snatch singer Darren Britton and the philosopher Paul Crowther also grew up there and were pupils at Belle Isle Primary School. DJ and rapper Tom Zanetti was born and raised in the area And the rapper Tom Lillywhite was born and raised and sings about the area.

== Amenities ==
At the heart of the area is a large area of public open land, in the centre of a traffic roundabout, called Belle Isle Circus; this was originally the site of a terminus for trams.

The spoil tips surrounding the former colliery are now being converted into woodland, adjacent to the ancient semi-natural woodlands of Middleton Wood.

== See also ==
- Listed buildings in Leeds (Middleton Park Ward)
