= Paula Froelich =

American journalist

- Born: October 30, 1973 (age 53); Leeds, England
- Occupation: journalist
- Writing career
- Genre: Fiction

Paula Froelich (born October 30, 1973) is an American journalist.

Froelich was born in Leeds, England in 1973 and grew up in Cincinnati, Ohio.

She wrote the novel, Mercury in Retrograde, which appeared on the New York Times Best Seller list in 2009. She has been a columnist for the New York Post Page Six. From April 2014 to October 2015 she was editor in chief of Yahoo Travel. In 2014, she founded the website, A Broad Abroad. She has been a columnist for The Times.
