= Andrew Edge =

English musician (born 1956)

- Born: David Andrew Edge; 8 December 1956 (age 69)
- Origin: Swarcliffe, Leeds, England
- Genres: Pop, dance, synthpop
- Instruments: Percussion, guitar, keyboards, vocals
- Labels: Arista Records; 10 Records/Virgin Records; EMI; BMG; Reprise
- Website: Andrew Edge

Andrew Edge (born David Andrew Edge; 8 December 1956) is a musician from Leeds, England. He moved to London in the late 1970s, and joined the Thompson Twins. After eighteen months Edge left the group and joined Uropa Lula, who released three singles (on Arista Records) and supported Big Country on a tour of Britain. Edge then joined Savage Progress, who supported the Thompson Twins on a tour of Britain in 1984.

Edge changed to vocals and writing songs after he moved from London to Linz, Austria. He started the group YOYO in 1990, bass/vocals Andreas Raffetseder, guitar/vocals Christoph Raffetseder, guitar Manfred Cellnigg, drums Hans Riener signing with EMI records, before working with Robert Ponger (producer of Falco). Edge later released a solo album in 1996; Northern Sky, on BMG records (Austria). Edge released a CD in 2011 under the name Drumsing, with percussionist Judy Klausner.

== Leeds ==
Edge took drum lessons from Leeds drummer Doug King, and also Geoff Myers, as Myers was a noted drum teacher in Leeds, and played with the big band Syd Lawrence Orchestra. Edge later worked with musicians from the Leeds College of Music in the group GPO (with Dave Cass, who later worked with Jive Bunny), as well as local Working Men's Club bands, like Street Choir.

== London ==
=== The Thompson Twins ===
The Thompson Twins auditioned for drummers at The Point Studio, 9 Eccleston Street, Victoria, London. Edge played with them for eighteen months with Tom Bailey, Pete Dodd and Jon Roog.

=== Uropa Lula ===
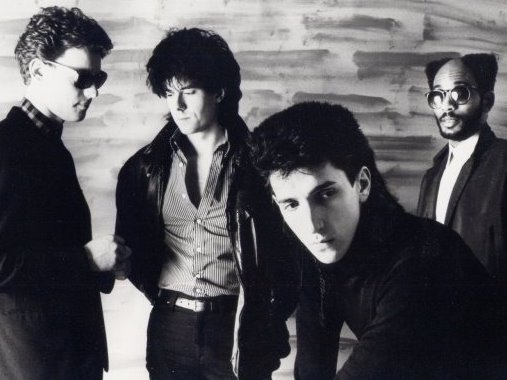
Uropa Lula/Viva Lula, 1982. Edge, Fromm, Lloyd, Dias

Edge later played drums for Uropa Lula (later called Viva Lula), with David Lloyd (voc/gtr), Allan Dias (bass), Pete Fromm (kybd) Carol Isaacs (kybd), and Chester Kamen (gtr) who is the brother of pop singer Nick Kamen.

Uropa Lula toured with Big Country in June 1983.

Arista Records released two singles by the group: Our Love Has Just Begun B/W I've Suddenly Remembered Something (ARIST476, 1982) as Uropa Lula. (Musicians: Lloyd, Fromm, Dias & Edge) Fell Upon A Jewel B/W She Appears to Vanish (ARIST498, 1983) as Uropa Lula. (Musicians: Lloyd, Dias, Edge, Isaacs and Kamen). Arista later dropped the group, and Edge joined Savage Progress.

=== Savage Progress ===
Savage Progress signed a contract with 10 Records (a subsidiary of Virgin Records) and released their first single, "My Soul Unwraps Tonight". Their first album was Celebration. Savage Progress joined the Thompson Twins on their "Into The Gap" tour of Britain (February 1984) as support act. In October of the same year they went on a tour of Germany, Austria and Switzerland, to capitalize on the success of their single releases.

=== Session drummer ===
Edge also played as a session musician for bands like The Chills ("Pink Frost") Julian Cope ("Lunatic and Fire Pistol") and Freur ("Doot Doot", which was initially produced at the Point Studio by Alex Burak). Edge also worked again with Dodd and Roog from the Thompson Twins in a band called Big View, recording a single called August Grass, which was released on Point Records (owned by Merton, the Thompson Twins publisher) in 1982. Edge played a two-week tour of France with the Australian group Died Pretty in 1986, as drummer Chris Welsh had broken his foot in London.

== Linz ==
Edge moved to Linz, Austria in the late 1980s, and recorded a piece called Experiment 501 – Investigating the Magic of the Right Steps, in 1989, with interactive artist Sam Auinger, which was presented as an a cappella piece for the Chemie Linz (Agrolinz Melamine International) and ÖMV (OMV Aktiengesellschaft) companies. Edge then sang for the Austrian band Camorra, with Peter Androsch (guitar) Robert Spour (keyboards) Sandy Sonntagbauer (bass) and Andreas Luger (drums).

=== YOYO ===
Edge later formed the band YOYO in Linz, signing with EMI records in Vienna. They played as the headlining act at the Linz Fest in 1991, and supported The Beach Boys at a concert in Linz.

=== Solo ===
Edge later worked with Robert Ponger, who was producer of Falco, and Austrian duo Paper Moon. Ponger arranged for Edge to support Joan Baez at the Arena, Vienna. Edge's collaboration with Ponger lasted three years, but Edge only used two songs (from 12 demo songs) for his solo CD on BMG records (Austria) called, Northern Sky (1996).

=== Session singer and songwriting ===
Edge sang backing vocals for LaLa Brooks (formerly of The Crystals) on her BMG (Austria) CD LaLa Brooks & Friends in 1994. In 1997, Edge sang Silent Night (in German) with Rainhard Fendrich.

Edge has worked with Mojique v2.0, Karli Möstl, Bob Zabek, Edge recorded a CD with Josef 'Judy' Klausner (percussion) featuring only voice and percussion.
