= Paul Crowther =

British philosopher (born 1953)

Paul David Crowther MRIA (/ˈkraʊðər/; born 24 August 1953) is a British philosopher. He is a professor of philosophy and author specialising in the fields of aesthetics, metaphysics, and visual culture. He has written nine books in the field of History of Art and Philosophy. He was born in Leeds, West Riding of Yorkshire, England, and he was raised in the Belle Isle estate, Hunslet, and Middleton areas of south Leeds. He began taking an interest in art and philosophy at the age of 16. He is a proponent of an approach to aesthetics he dubbed "post-analytic phenomenology".

== Career ==
Crowther initially enrolled at the University of Manchester to study history and politics. He subsequently migrated to the University of Leeds where he took a joint honours degree in Philosophy and the History of Art. He was a graduate student at the University of York and also holds a teaching certificate in Classical Studies. He obtained his doctorate in philosophy from the University of Oxford. Crowther is a former fellow of Corpus Christi College, Oxford where he was a lecturer at the Department of the History of Art and Reader in the History Faculty. He has also taught at the University of St Andrew's (Fife, Scotland), the University of Central Lancashire, and Jacobs University Bremen. Between 2009 and 2016, Crowther held the post of Chair of Philosophy at the National University of Ireland, Galway and subsequently has been emeritus professor of philosophy at the National University of Ireland, Galway.

In May 2017 Crowther was elected as a member of the Royal Irish Academy.

== Philosophical work ==
Crowther's interests and expertise are in the fields of visual aesthetics, phenomenology, and Kant. Works by him on the philosophy of visual art have been translated into Chinese, Korean, German, and Serbian, amongst other languages.

In 2014, Crowther (together with Slovenian artist Mojca Oblak, and assistance from the Ministry of Culture of Slovenia and the Moore Institute in Galway, Ireland) organized an exhibition of Victorian art entitled Awakening Beauty at the National Gallery in Ljubljana, Slovenia.

== Selected bibliography ==
- The Kantian Sublime: From Morality to Art (1989)
- Art and Embodiment: From Aesthetics to Self-Consciousness (1993)
- Critical Aesthetics and Postmodernism (1996)
- The Language of Twentieth-Century Art: A Conceptual History (1997)
- The Transhistorical Image: Philosophizing Art and Its History (2002)
- Philosophy After Postmodernism: Civilized Values and the Scope of Knowledge (2003)
- Defining Art, Creating the Canon: Artistic Value in an Era of Doubt (2007)
- Phenomenology of the Visual Arts (even the frame) (2009)
- The Kantian Aesthetic: From Knowledge to the Avant-Garde (2010)
- The Phenomenology of Modern Art: Exploding Deleuze, Illuminating Style (2012)
- Phenomenologies of Art and Vision: A Post-Analytic Turn (2013)
- How Pictures Complete Us: The Beautiful, the Sublime, and the Divine (2016)
- What Drawing and Painting Really Mean: The Phenomenology of Image and Gesture (2017)
- Geneses of Postmodern Art: Technology As Iconology (2018)
- Digital Art, Aesthetic Creation: The Birth of a Medium (2018)
- The Aesthetics of Self-Becoming: How Art Forms Empower (2019)
- Theory of the Art Object (2021)
- The Phenomenology of Aesthetic Consciousness and Phantasy: Working with Husserl (2021)
