= William Boynton Butler =

Recipient of the Victoria Cross (1894–1972)

William Boynton Butler VC
- Born: 20 November 1894; Armley, Leeds
- Died: 25 March 1972 (aged 77); Leeds
- Burial place: Hunslet Cemetery
- Military career
- Allegiance: United Kingdom
- Branch: British Army
- Rank: Private
- Units: The West Yorkshire Regiment; Home Guard
- Conflicts: World War I World War II
- Awards: Victoria Cross; Croix de Guerre (France)

William Boynton Butler VC (20 November 1894 – 25 March 1972) was an English recipient of the Victoria Cross, the highest and most prestigious award for gallantry in the face of the enemy that can be awarded to British and Commonwealth forces.

Butler was 22 years old, and a private in the 17th Battalion, The West Yorkshire Regiment (The Prince of Wales's Own), British Army, attached to 106th TM. Battery during the First World War when the following deed took place on 6 August 1917 east of Lempire, France for which he was awarded the VC.

For most conspicuous bravery when in charge of a Stokes gun in trenches which were being heavily shelled. Suddenly one of the fly-off levers of a Stokes shell came off and fired the shell in the emplacement. Private Butler picked up the shell and jumped to the entrance of the emplacement, which at that moment a party of infantry were passing. He shouted to them to hurry past as the shell was going off, and turning round, placed himself between the party of men and the live shell and so held it till they were out of danger. He then threw the shell on to the parados, and took cover in the bottom of the trench. The shell exploded almost on leaving his hand, greatly damaging the trench. By extreme good luck Private Butler was contused only. Undoubtedly his great presence of mind and disregard of his own life saved the lives of the officer and men in the emplacement and the party which was passing at the time.

The Stokes gun was a 3-inch trench mortar invented by Sir Wilfred Stokes.

== Bibliography ==
- Gliddon, Gerald (2004). VCs of the First World War: Cambrai 1917. Sutton Publishing. ISBN 978-0-75-247668-1.
- Whitworth, Alan (2012). Yorkshire VCs. Pen and Sword Books. ISBN 978-1-84884-778-1.
