= Florence Shufflebottom =

British circus performer

- Born: 12 December 1931
- Died: 25 October 2014 (aged 82)
- Known for: Circus performance, sharpshooting

Florence Shufflebottom (12 December 1931 – 25 October 2014) was a fairground performer, sharpshooter and snake-charmer who became known as the 'British Annie Oakley'.

== Early life and family history ==
Florence was born into a family of circus performers. Her paternal grandfather was William Shufflebottom (1850s–1916), who worked as a Buffalo Bill impersonator under the name 'Texas Bill'. He and his wife, Rosina (1872–1937) had ten children, including Florence's father Richard Shufflebottom. Rosina was also a snake-charmer, going on to outlive William, who died in 1916 after being crushed by a horse during a performance. Following his father's death, Richard and two of his brothers, Wally and William, toured the UK with their own Wild West inspired show, eventually setting up the Colorado Family Troupe.

== Professional life ==
From a young age, Florence was involved in the family show, performing as a snake-charmer from the age of five, and as a target for her father's knife-throwing act. She was known for a trick called 'The Kiss of Death' where she would place the head of a snake inside her mouth.

She was best known for her skills as a sharpshooter. Using a Winchester .22, she performed a variety of tricks, earning her a reputation as the 'British Annie Oakley'. Her career ended abruptly after an accident in which she shot her mother in the knuckle, having been knocked by a boy in the audience of a show. She married her husband Robert Campbell in 1957 and the two went on to more business ventures, including running a Selby bingo hall.

== Later life and legacy ==
In 1994 Florence and her husband gave a donation to the National Fairground and Circus Archive at The University of Sheffield, comprising their family collection. She died in 2014 at the age of 82, and her body was cremated at Cottingley Crematorium.

Her name is one of those featured on the sculpture Ribbons, unveiled in 2024.
