= Rakul Magnussen =

Faroese footballer (born 1988)

Personal information
- Full name: Rakul Vesturdal Magnussen
- Date of birth: 26 April 1988 (age 38)
- Position: Midfielder

Team information
- Current team: EB/Streymur/Skála

Senior career*
Years	Team	Apps	(Gls)
- EB/Streymur/Skála

International career^{‡}
2004–2006	Faroe Islands U19	9	(0)
2011–2014	Faroe Islands	4	(0)
- * Club domestic league appearances and goals ‡ National team caps and goals as of 19 June 2014

Rakul Vesturdal Magnussen (born 3 April 1988) is a Faroese footballer who plays as a midfielder for 1. deild kvinnur club EB/Streymur/Skála. She has been a member of the Faroe Islands women's national team.
