= Jonathan Robert Ogden =

English composer

Jonathan Robert Ogden (13 June 1806 – 26 March 1882) was an English composer, known for Holy Songs and Musical Prayers, published in 1842.

== Life ==
Ogden was born in Leeds; his father, Robert Ogden (died 1816), was in partnership there with Thomas Bolton, a Liverpool merchant. Ogden was educated in Leeds, partly under Joseph Hutton, minister of Mill Hill Unitarian Chapel; he became a unitarian, though his parents were members of the Church of England. For a short time he was placed in the office of Thomas Bolton in Liverpool, but had no taste for mercantile life, and showed an early bent for music. To forward his musical education, his mother (whose maiden name was Glover) moved to London. Here Ogden became a pupil of Ignaz Moscheles, and later of August Kollman. He studied for a year in Paris under Johann Peter Pixis, and for three years in Munich under Joseph Hartmann Stuntz; in 1827 he visited Vienna.

He married in 1834 Frances, daughter of Thomas Bolton. Afterwards he settled in the Lake District, at Lakefield, Sawrey, Lancashire, where he lived the life of a country gentleman. The religious philosopher James Martineau, when compiling Hymns for the Christian Church and Home (1840), invited Ogden to supply tunes of unusual metre. Ogden, after much persuasion, assented. The result was Holy Songs and Musical Prayers, published by Novello in 1842.

A feature of the volume which evoked criticism was the adaptation as hymn tunes of pieces by Beethoven and others. From the seventh and much enlarged edition (1872) the adaptations were omitted. Alexander Gordon later wrote: "The style of Ogden's original music is not ecclesiastical, nor are his compositions well adapted for ordinary congregational use; but they possess great beauty, and their spirit is rightly indicated in the title of the volume."

Ogden was a J.P. for Lancashire. He died at Lakefield on 26 March 1882, and was buried on 31 March in Hawkshead churchyard.
