= Lynching of Andrew Richards =

Lynching of a black man in Illinois

- Date: September 1877
- Location: Winchester, Illinois, United States
- Participants: Residents of Scott County, Illinois
- Deaths: 1

A mob of white Winchester, Illinois, residents lynched Andrew Richards, a black man, on September 11, 1877. He was forcibly taken from the Winchester, Illinois jail by a mob of several hundred people. He was accused of the rape of a white woman, Mrs. John Pruitt, in a nearby orchard.

== Background information on lynching ==
A misconception about lynching was that it was confined solely to southern practice. However, lynching took place all across the United States in almost every state. Lynchings are acts of extrajudicial killings dating back to the 1830s which marked the pre–Civil War South. The main act of lynching included hanging from trees. Within acts of lynching, African Americans were specifically targeted by whites. There were four main steps of lynching consisting of an accusation by a white person or group, an arrest by police, an assembly of a white mob, and finally a murder. According to the Equal Justice Initiative (EJI), there were about 56 lynchings that took place in Illinois. The historian Michael J. Pfeifer argues that "racial lynching in the North stemmed from the clash between, on the one hand, the claims of an ascendent legal order in the early 1860s that was avowedly racially neutral, and, on the other, the demands of a localistic, aggrieved, racially defined community protective of what it viewed as its social prerogatives." According to the EJI, over 4,000 lynching took place between the years of 1877 and 1950. Lynching became a mechanism for terrifying and controlling African Americans. "it served as a psychological balm for white supremacy." This story of lynching takes place in the North, specifically Winchester, Illinois.

== Lynching of Andrew Richards ==
In the morning of September 11, 1877, Richards was imprisoned for the alleged rape of Mrs. John Pruitt, a white woman. This lynching took place near the end of the Reconstruction era. The alleged rape took place in an orchard near Winchester, Illinois, United States. Winchester, Illinois is a city located in county of Scott County. On Sunday night, Sheriff Blair put Andrew Richards to keep him safe from a mob of people who intended to hurt him. The next morning at 5 A.M., the sheriff took Richards to Winchester. Five hours later, at 10 o'clock A.M., a mob consisted of several hundred people took Andrew Richards. The mob committed the act of hanging him in a place a few miles west of Winchester, in Miner's grove. The Sheriff could not save Andrew Richards.

On September 20, 1877, the Weekly Davenport Democrat published a section of the newspaper detailing the lynching of Richards. The Davenport Democrat was a weekly newspaper originating in Davenport, Iowa, created by a man named Alexander Montgomery in September 1848. Its importance lays within the Democratic party because they wanted this newspaper to represent their interests. On Saturday September 22, 1877, The Great Bend Weekly Tribune published a section of the newspaper shortly detailing the lynching of Richards in one sentence. The Great Bend was published in Great Bend, Kansas.

== Reaction ==
The main reaction to Andrew Richards lynching was African American residents of Winchester fled the city that day. The African American residents left due to fear of violence. Many African Americans in not only the South but also the North lived in fear daily of being lynched. The lynchings in not only the North but the South as well, "indicate how the sectional crisis and the Civil War destabilized and reconfigured northern political culture and social relations". As mentioned above, lynching set fear shockwaves among African Americans in the North and had profound effects on the lives of African Americans. "Lynching created a fearful environment where racial subordination and segregation was maintained with limited resistance for decades."

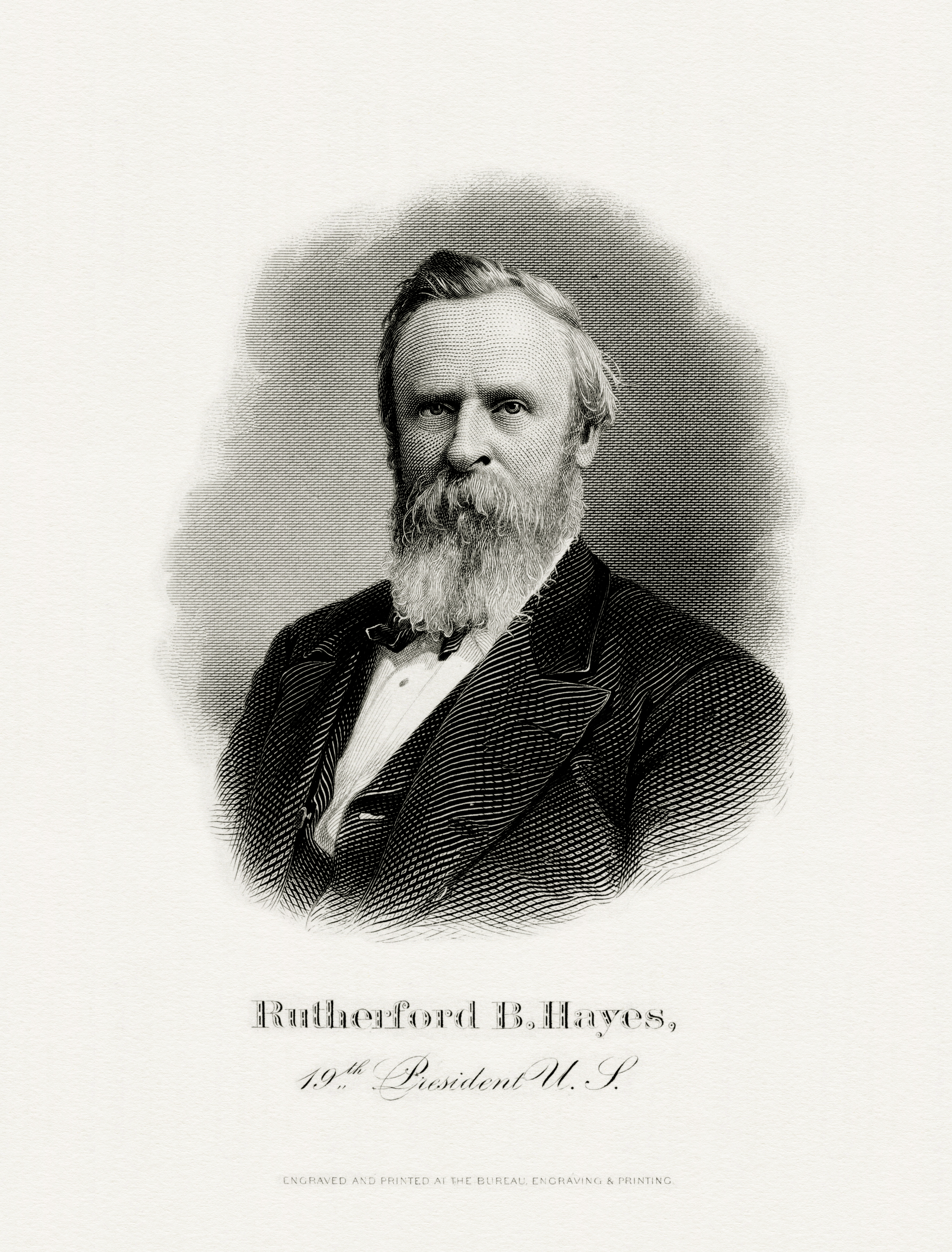

The political climate of the United States also played a role in the views of lynchings. The President in 1877 was Rutherford B. Hayes, serving at the 19th president. Hayes won the presidency due to the Compromise of 1877. In connection with lynching during 1877 was slavery. "An opponent of slavery, he also became active in the newly formed Republican Party, which was organized in the 1850s to oppose the expansion of slavery to U.S. territories." The president's role in the way slavery was viewed had some impact on the country. However, the country still battled with the lynchings in the South and in the North.

== See also ==
- List of lynchings and other homicides in Illinois
- Lynching in the United States
- National Association for the Advancement of Colored People
- Equal Justice Initiative
