= Hunslet Cemetery =

Cemetery in Leeds, England

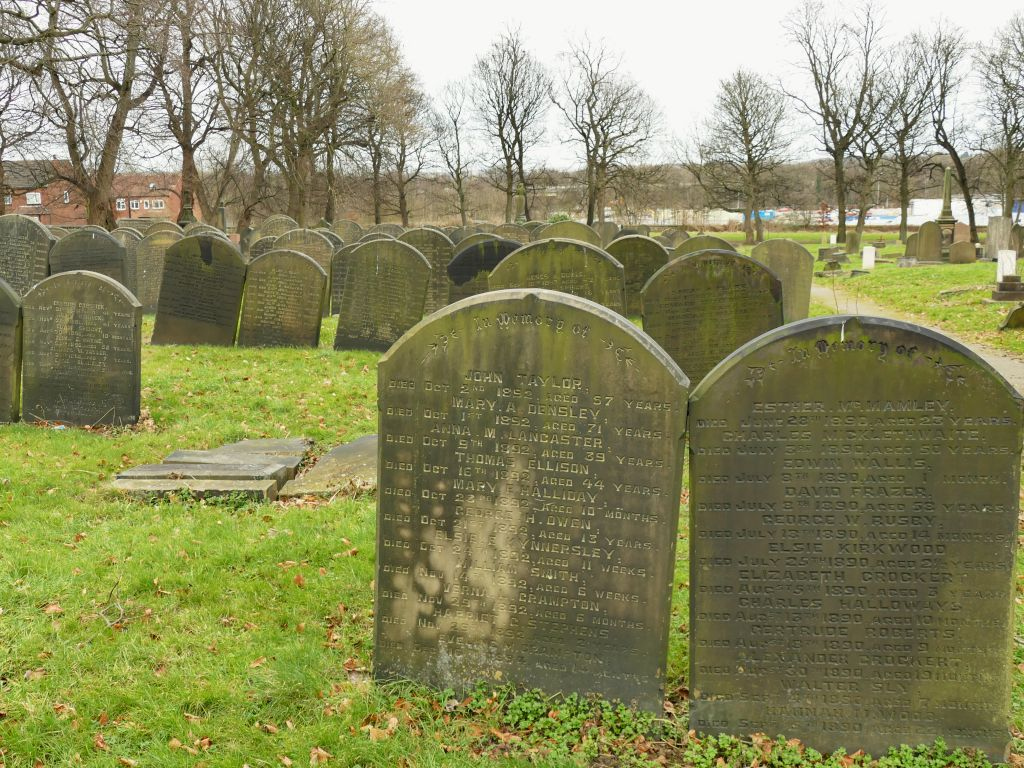
- Hunslet cemetery - paupers' graves
- Interactive map of Hunslet Cemetery

Details
- Established: 1845
- Location: Leeds, West Yorkshire
- Country: England
- Coordinates: 53.768°N 1.522°W
- Type: Public
- Owned by: Leeds City Council
- Website: www.leeds.gov.uk/births-deaths-and-marriages/death/bereavement-services/find-cemeteries-and-crematoria
- Find a Grave: Hunslet Cemetery

Hunslet Cemetery (sometimes known as Woodhouse Hill Cemetery) is an open cemetery in the Hunslet area of south Leeds, West Yorkshire, England. The first part of the cemetery opened in 1845, one of the first municipal cemeteries in England, and has since been enlarged to take in areas to the west, and to the south. The original 1845 section is grade II listed, and the old and new sections combined have 164 Commonwealth War Graves.

== History ==
Hunslet was granted the right to build a chapel (St Mary's) in the 1620s, which was a daughter church to the parish church in the centre of Leeds, St Peter's, (now Leeds Minster). Burials would still routinely take place in the graveyard surrounding St Peter's in Leeds as that was the main parish church. Even so, parishioners from Hunslet could be buried in the graveyard of St Mary's at Hunslet, but the vicar of Leeds parish church was permitted to levy a fee, which irritated the people of Hunslet. Overcrowding of the graveyard at St Peter's in Leeds led to the general surgeon of Leeds to highlight the parlous state of the graveyard of Leeds parish church in 1842, commenting that "...this burial-ground has been disused for some years, excepting for interments in particular graves, on account of its perfectly engorged state, and the danger of disinterring decomposing bodies." The problem of overcrowding extended to the church in Hunslet as well, which in 1832, could not accommodate overwhelming numbers of cholera victims. As a result, the dead from a local cholera outbreak were buried at a new site on Hunslet Moor, but the memorial and the bodies were moved to Hunslet Cemetery in 1968 to make way for the building of the M1 motorway. (Note: The M1 motorway in this section was redesignated as the M621 motorway upon the opening of the M1-A1 link in 1999.) In 1851, Leeds Council closed the graveyard at St Mary's Hunslet except to those who already held family graves or pre-bought empty plots. Three years later, all burials ceased at St Mary's church by order of the government.

The cemetery site at Hunslet was opened after the Leeds Burial Grounds Act 1842 (5 & 6 Vict. c. ciii) was passed through Parliament. (Note: Sub-headed as For providing additional burial grounds in the Parish of Leeds in the West Riding of the County of York.) The first part of the cemetery opened on Woodhouse Hill in the suburb of Hunslet in June 1845, and covered an area of 10 acres (4 ha), at a cost of around £6,000 (equivalent to £631,000 in 2025), with funds raised by levying taxes on the inhabitants of Hunslet Parish. It was the first municipal cemetery to be opened in Leeds, with Burmantofts Cemetery (later Beckett Street Cemetery) opening soon afterwards with its first burial in August 1845. The land set aside for the Church of England burials, was consecrated by the Bishop of Ripon in September 1844, and its first burial, that of an infant, was undertaken in June 1845. This has led to claims that Hunslet is England's first municipal burial site. At that time, Hunslet was still a township and not part of Leeds, and the whole area was in the Diocese of Ripon, so such matters as consecrating ground, which required higher church authorities would fall to the incumbent Bishop of Ripon. (Note: Hunslet would remain a separate township until 1924, when the Leeds Corporation Act combined several areas, including Hunslet, within the City of Leeds.) Further consecrations were undertaken in January 1930, by the Bishop of Knaresborough, who consecrated an area of 2,662 square yards (2,226 m^{2}).

The cemetery was referred to as Woodhouse Hill Cemetery until the 1890s, when the name Hunslet Cemetery became more prevalent; a news report from 1892 stated that the council had approved mortuary chapels to be built at Hunslet Cemetery at a cost of £478 (equivalent to £53,000 in 2025).

By 1891, the cemetery contained 33,767 bodies, though a good portion of those buried had been interred in pauper's or Guinea Graves. A Guinea Grave was one which a family could invest a guinea to have a marked grave, but the grave itself was left open until it was full, which could sometimes number 20 bodies. Hunslet, along with Beckett Street Cemetery, was notable for this type of grave. Around 1892, the burial committee was asked about the period that available space would last, and it was determined that the unconsecrated ground would last 50 years, but the consecrated ground would only last a further 25 years. A description of the old cemetery from 1892, praises the way that the cemetery was laid out in neat rows with tree-lined avenues. However, the same description bemoans the state of the trees due to pollution from the nearby factories and chemical works.

By the start of the 20th century, the increasing number of burials meant that expansion was necessary; land was purchased in December 1917 and February 1918, and so the cemetery was extended across the other side of Middleton Road in 1918, and then a further section to the immediate south of the original cemetery was created in 1959. The old cemetery contains 90 Commonwealth War Graves, and the newer section contains 74. Another grave in the old cemetery contains the resting place of James Barass, a private who survived the Charge of the Light Brigade unscathed. Barass died in 1881. By 1990, the cemetery contained 72,400 graves.

In the 21st century, the cemetery has been plagued by vandalism and stone thefts. Barriers have been installed around monuments, and the monuments themselves have been painted with special coatings to make the monuments easier to clean if spates of vandalism reoccur.

== Structures and layout ==
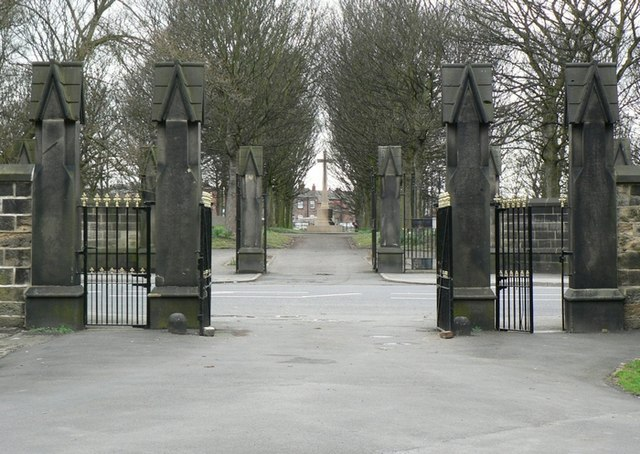
The gates of the cemetery across Middleton Road

The walls, lodges and a large building which later contained two chapels, were designed by Robert Dennis Chantrell and Thomas Shaw. Pevsner described the lodges as "..Tudor-bethan style.. with slender octagonal stacks, [and] Gothic gate piers." The two chapels were debated about for some time, as it was realised that a conformist (Church of England), and non-conformist (other denominations) would be needed. The debate centred around whether there should be two chapels under one roof, or two chapels in the same building but separated by a wall. (Note: Often, the Church of England chapel was referred to incorrectly as a church.) In the end, the conformist chapel was built on the north side, and the non-conformist on the south side of the same building.

The cemetery has the following listed structures:

- The cemetery itself is grade II listed
- The memorial to those who died in the cut nail works collapse (grade II)
- The chapels (grade II)
- The lodges, gate piers, gates and walls to Hunslet Cemetery (grade II)

The cemetery was laid out in a grid pattern, an idea proposed for municipal cemeteries by John Claudius Loudon.

== Notable interments ==
- William Boynton Butler, First World War VC winner, died in 1972
- Albert Goldthorpe, rugby league football player
