= Anne Lyon Hansen =

English nurse

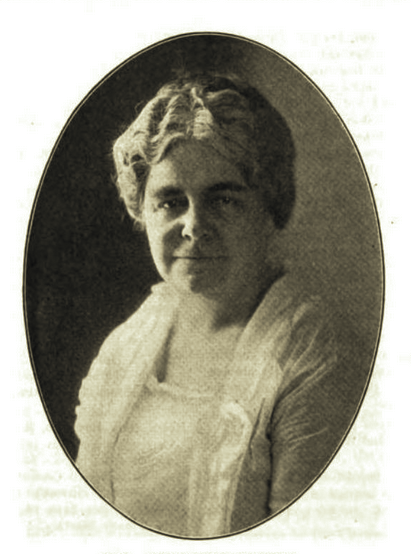
(1925)

Anne Lyon Hanson (4 January 1878 – 11 March 1938) was an English nurse who emigrated to the US. She was a leader in the areas of public health and social work.

She was the president of both the New York State Organisation Public Health Nursing and the President of the New York State Nurses' Association.

== Early life and education ==
Anne Lyon Hansen was born in Leeds, England on 4 January 1878 to Scottish and English parents Anna Lyon and Joseph L. Nichols.

She received a private school education in England, before learning nursing at Buffalo Children's Hospital Training School. She received post-graduate training at Buffalo General Hospital.

== Career ==
Hanson had a long time involvement with the Visiting Nursing Association of Buffalo, from the role of staff nurse in 1905, to the position of Director from 1915 until her death. She was a member of the National Committee on Red Cross Nursing Service, and was a member of the White House conference on Public Health Nursing called by President Herbert Hoover.

She was the president of the New York State Organisation Public Health Nursing for four years and the President of the New York State Nurses' Association for three years.

== Personal life and death ==
Hanson was married to Viggo Hansen, who whom she had a son, also named Viggo; they lived on Franklin Street, Buffalo. She died of a heart condition in Buffalo, New York on 11 March 1938, aged 60.

Her funeral procession included an escort of sixty uniformed nurse members of the Visiting Nursing Association of Buffalo.
