= Anna Sunadóttir Hansen =

Faroese footballer (born 1998)

Personal information
- Date of birth: 20 August 1998 (age 28)
- Position: Goalkeeper

Team information
- Current team: EBS / Skála

Senior career*
| Years | Team | Apps | (Gls) |
| 2014-2021 | EB/Streymur/Skála | 158 | (1) |

International career^{‡}
- Faroe Islands
- * Club domestic league appearances and goals as of 19:37, 30 August 2019 (UTC) ‡ National team caps and goals as of 19:37, 30 August 2019 (UTC)

Anna Sunadóttir Hansen (born 20 August 1998) is a Faroese footballer who plays as a goalkeeper and has appeared for the Faroe Islands women's national team.

== Career ==
Hansen has been capped for the Faroe Islands national team, appearing for the team during the 2019 FIFA Women's World Cup qualifying cycle.
