= Yahoo Travel =

Defunct travel website

Yahoo! Travel
- Website type: Travel
- Owner: Yahoo!
- Commercial: Yes
- Launched: 1997; 29 years ago
- Current status: Defunct

Yahoo! Travel was a website operated by Yahoo! that offered guide books, daily articles, and travel booking services.

== History ==
The site was launched in 1997.

In May 2007, additional features were added.

In January 2014, it was the 9th-largest travel booking website.

In February 2016, the website was shut down.

== See also ==
- Tile Map Service
