= David Lloyd (musician) =

English singer & musician

- Origin: England
- Genres: Rock, indie pop, dance-rock
- Occupations: Singer, songwriter, artist, musician, record producer
- Instruments: Vocalist, keyboards, guitar, synthesizer, harmonica, saxophone
- Years active: 1980–present
- Labels: Worldwide: Arista Records, Canada SPG Music

David Lloyd is an English singer, musician, songwriter, currently living in Newcastle upon Tyne.

== Beginnings ==
David Lloyd is a multi-media artist/composer/singer from South Shields in the North East of England. Lloyd moved to London in 1976 to study at the Central School of Art and Design. Whilst still an art student, he played guitar in punk bands the Fauves and the Brides of Christ before singing in an early incarnation of The The with bassist Tom Johnson and drummer Peter Ashworth. In the late 1970s, Lloyd, under the pseudonym David Elliot, worked on the Snips album La Rocca with Chris Spedding, Midge Ure and Bill Nelson, writing one of the songs, "Happy Sometimes".

== Uropa Lula ==
In 1980, Lloyd formed Uropa Lula with Hilde Swendgaard (manager) and Kevin Smith (drums), making two short films, Here in the Sun and At Night Time with Video Active. They were joined by Colin Prior (bass) and Peter Fromm (keyboards) in 1981 and began performing live in London, opening for John Cale, Alternative TV and Depeche Mode. American bass player Allan Dias replaced Prior in August of the same year. In September, the band recorded three songs, "Here's a Medal", "Timber Fall I" and "My Black Hour" for the Nicky Horne Capital Radio show. Leeds born drummer Andrew Edge joined the group later that year. Uropa Lula signed to Arista Records in May 1982 and spent the rest of that year recording album tracks and their first two singles, "Our Love Has Just Begun" and "Fell Upon a Jewel" at Trident Studios, The Manor Studio, Townhouse Studios and RAK Studios. To tie in with the release of the first single, the band recorded a live session for the David Jensen show on Radio 1 for the BBC. The session was produced by Dale Griffin, the English drummer and founding member of 1970s rock band Mott the Hoople and featured two songs, "Here's a Medal" and "Timber Fall I". A month later, Uropa Lula returned to London's Capital Radio to record their second live session for the Nicky Horne show playing two songs, "I Am My Older Brother" and "Leather and Metal (Winter's Here)". In the fall of 1982, guitarist Chester Kamen and keyboard player Carol Isaacs joined the group in time for tours of the UK and US in 1983. The group's opening US show was at the Ritz in New York (1 February 1982). This was followed by dates at the Mudd Club (7 February 1982), the 9:30 Club in Washington D.C., the New Jersey City Gardens and in a show at Brooklyn Zoo (26 February 1982) where they shared the bill with Holly and the Italians. Upon their return to the UK, on 2 June 1982 the group played at the Camden Palace (now called Koko) and opened for Big Country at the Royal Court Theatre, Liverpool (19 June 1982) and John Cale at The Venue, Victoria, London (5 July 1982). With some irony, the band had by this point changed their name to Viva Lula and as part of the promotion of their third single, "Dad Sings the Blues", they toured the UK with Big Country in June 1983. Lloyd disbanded the group in October 1983 and embarked on a solo career, albeit continuing to work with Uropa Lula members Kamen, Dias and Smith throughout the '80s.

== The Neighbourhood Talks ==
After Uropa Lula, Lloyd began work on The Neighbourhood Talks, a solo project that continued through to the end of the 1990s, producing five albums. Lloyd continued to work with ex-Uropa Lula members Dias, Kamen and Smith, whilst bringing in a number of other musicians who would contribute to the project including vocalists Pepsi Demacque, Carole Rowley, Sony Southern, Janet Sewell and Carmalita Wyatte; guitarists Maurice Michaels and Chris Pye; Simon Etchel on keyboards and Bimbo Acock on saxophone. This project led to Lloyd singing on the motion picture soundtrack of the Rafal Zielinski film Recruits featuring as lead vocalist on "Temptation" and the title track "Recruits". In 1994, "The Sacrifice of Love", a song written by Lloyd and performed by the Neighbourhood Talks, was included on the soundtrack of the motion picture Funny Man. He sang on numerous TV commercials during the 1980s including those for Coca-Cola, Halifax Building Society, BASF Audio, British Gas and Southern Water. In 1992, Lloyd co-wrote and performed "Really Something" with Kamen as ‘The Playground’ for the motion picture Split Second.

== The Lovefield ==
As the principle producer, singer, songwriter and instrumentalist and only official member of the Lovefield, Lloyd was solely responsible for the project's direction, although in 1992 he collaborated with Sep Cipriano (keyboards), Mitch Horner (bass) and ex-Gail Ann Dorsey guitarist Bub Roberts (guitar) for a number of low key live Lovefield performances. In 2009, Lloyd made the Lovefield catalogue available for the first time.

== Dumb Baby Sounds ==
In 2010, Lloyd, by now living in Newcastle, began recording again, covering the Nine Inch Nails song, "Hurt" and the Velvet Underground's "Femme Fatale". Later that year, Lloyd made the films Blue Parade and Chills as the first steps of a new multimedia project Dumb Baby Sounds. In June 2011, Lloyd made the film At the End of Everything for a song of the same name. Lloyd is the principle producer, singer, songwriter and instrumentalist in Dumb Baby Sounds. "Rain Dancing", released on 9 September 2011 was the Dumb Baby Sounds debut single. The follow-up, "World on Fire", was released on 23 April 2012. Both songs were written and produced by Lloyd. An accompanying film using the montage work of Dumb Baby Sounds guitarist Johnny Seven was made to accompany the release of "World on Fire". In November 2012, Lloyd wrote, produced and performed "Dress Me Good", editing and creating the images to accompany the composition. In December of the same year, Lloyd produced the John VII – Seven Minutes project, a collection of seven separate pieces, all one minute long, written and recorded in seven days. The Seven Minutes EP was made available as a legal free download on SoundCloud.

== John VII ==
In 2013, Lloyd, having been the guiding force behind 2012's Seven Minutes project, focussed on creating John VII as an offshoot to Dumb Baby Sounds. The first single "In Babylon" was given a worldwide release on 31 January 2013. The third John VII single "Dress Me Good" was released on 29 July. Lloyd is the sole producer/composer behind the John VII project.

== Discography ==
=== Singles ===
with Uropa Lula

- "Our Love Has Just Begun" b/w "I've Suddenly Remembered Something" (ARIST476, 1982) (as Uropa Lula)
- "Fell Upon a Jewel" b/w "She Appears to Vanish" (ARIST498, 1983) (as Uropa Lula)
- "Dad Sings the Blues" b/w "Surely There Must Be Some Mistake" (ARIST 540, July 1983) (as Viva Lula)

=== Compilation appearances ===
"Our Love Has Just Begun" featured on Hardest Hits Volume 1, SPG Music Productions (1991)
