= Richard Beck (rugby union) =

English rugby union player

- Beck before the British and Irish Cup Final in 2014
- Born: Richard Andrew Beck; 13 June 1989 (age 37) Leeds, England
- Height: 6 ft 5 in (1.95 m)
- Weight: 16 st 4 lb (104 kg)
- School: Leeds Grammar School
- University: University of Leeds

Rugby union career
- Position: Flanker
Amateur team(s)
Years	Team	Apps	(Points)
1994–2003	Roundhegians RFC		
2003–2006	Leodensians RUFC		
2006–2008	Leeds Tykes Academy		
Senior career
Years	Team	Apps	(Points)
2008–2009	Harrogate	28	(5)
2009–2011	Otley RUFC	32	(20)
2011–2019	Yorkshire Carnegie	132	(70)
- Correct as of 27 June 2019 (UTC)

Richard Andrew Beck (born 13 June 1989 in Leeds) is a professional rugby union coach for Wasps. He played for 13 years for Yorkshire Carnegie.

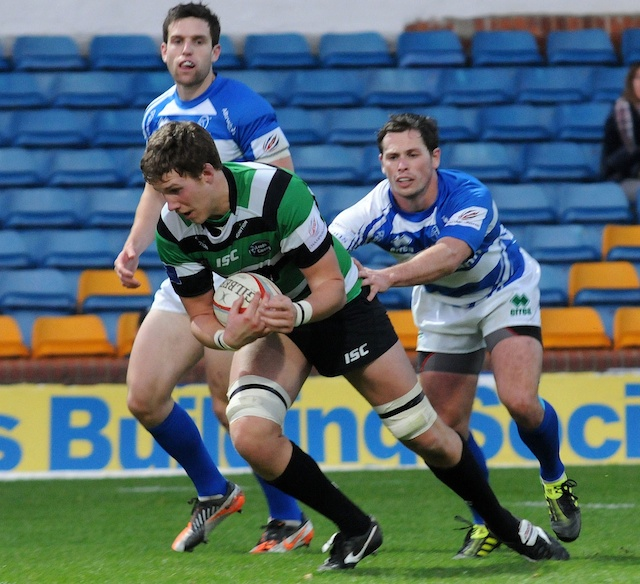
Beck scores for Leeds Carnegie

== Early life ==
Beck was born in Leeds and went to school at North Leeds Preparatory School in Roundhay. He was a student of Leeds Grammar School. While at Leeds Grammar School he excelled at sport playing in the first XV rugby union team, the First XI football team and the first XI cricket team in his final year at school. He went to the University of Leeds after school and graduated in 2011 with a 2:1 honours degree in Economics and Politics.

== Club career ==
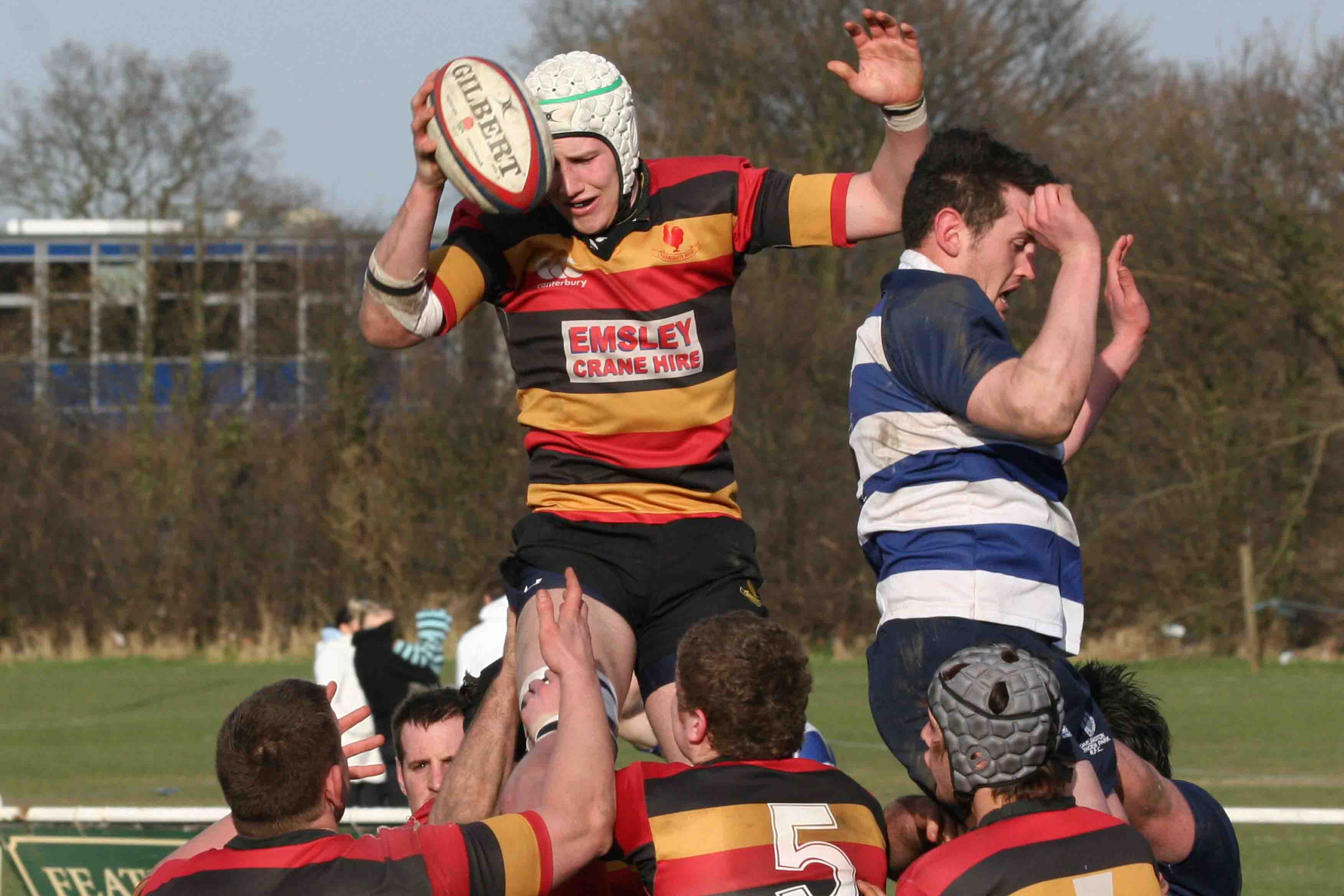
Beck in action for Harrogate

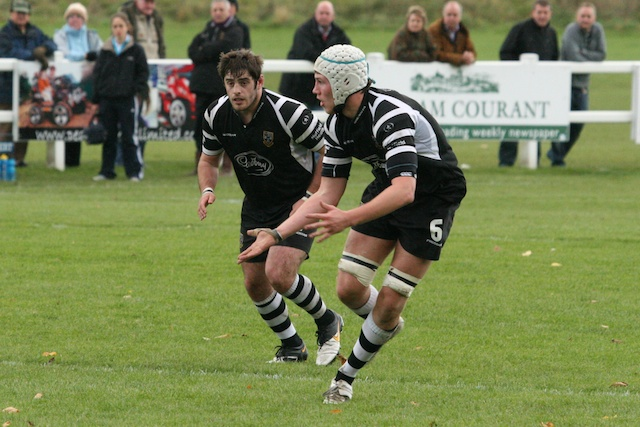
Otley v Tynedale

Beck started playing rugby at the age of five for Roundhegians RFC. He later played amateur rugby at Leodensians RUFC in Leeds. Beck joined Leeds Carnegie (then Leeds Tykes) Academy in 2006 while still at Leeds Grammar School.

After joining the Leeds Carnegie Academy, Beck was loaned to RFU National Three North club Harrogate RUFC for the 2008–09 season and then, during the 2009–10 and 2010–11 seasons, to RFU National Two club Otley RUFC.

In May 2009, Beck played for the Wooden Spoon Society charity team in the Amsterdam Sevens tournament.

He made his Leeds Carnegie debut against Leicester Tigers in the LV= Cup game in the 2009–2010 season when Leeds Carnegie secured a 28–17 victory. He retained his place for the following Cup game against the Sale Sharks, coming on from the bench in the 24–17 defeat.

In the inaugural J P Morgan Premiership Sevens Series in July 2010, Beck played for Leeds Carnegie against the Leicester Tigers, Sale Sharks and the Newcastle Falcons.

He played in the two pre-season games for Leeds Carnegie in the 2011–12 season against the Newcastle Falcons and the Newport Gwent Dragons. He made his full first-team start for Leeds Carnegie against Rotherham Titans in the British and Irish Cup on 21 September 2011. He made his first-team start in the 2011–12 RFU Championship against the Doncaster Knights on 2 October 2011. He scored his first try for Leeds Carnegie against London Scottish on 8 October 2011. He finished the 2011–2012 season with Leeds Carnegie having scored 4 tries for Leeds having made a total of 28 appearances.

At the start of the 2012–2013 season, he started both pre-season friendly games against Newcastle Falcons and London Wasps. Beck suffered a shoulder injury which kept him out of the side for half of the season returning for the second leg of the play-off semi-final against Newcastle Falcons on 12 May 2013.

At the start of the 2013–2014 season, Beck played in both pre-season friendly games against Sale Sharks and Doncaster Knights. In the final warm-up game against Leeds Metropolitan University, he injured his knee which kept him on the sidelines for the first few games of the new season. He made his comeback against London Scottish F.C. on 16 November 2013 and made his first start of the season against Jersey on 24 November 2013, being named Man of the Match by the Leeds Carnegie sponsors.

The 2013–2014 season ended disappointingly for Leeds Carnegie with defeat in the Greene King IPA Championship play-off semi-final against London Welsh and in the British and Irish Cup Final against Leinster 'A'.

On 9 July 2014, it was announced that Leeds Carnegie would change their name to Yorkshire Carnegie for the 2014–2015 season.

The 2014–2015 season for Beck started belatedly with an appearance off the bench against Plymouth Albion in the Greene King IPA Championship on 21 November 2014.

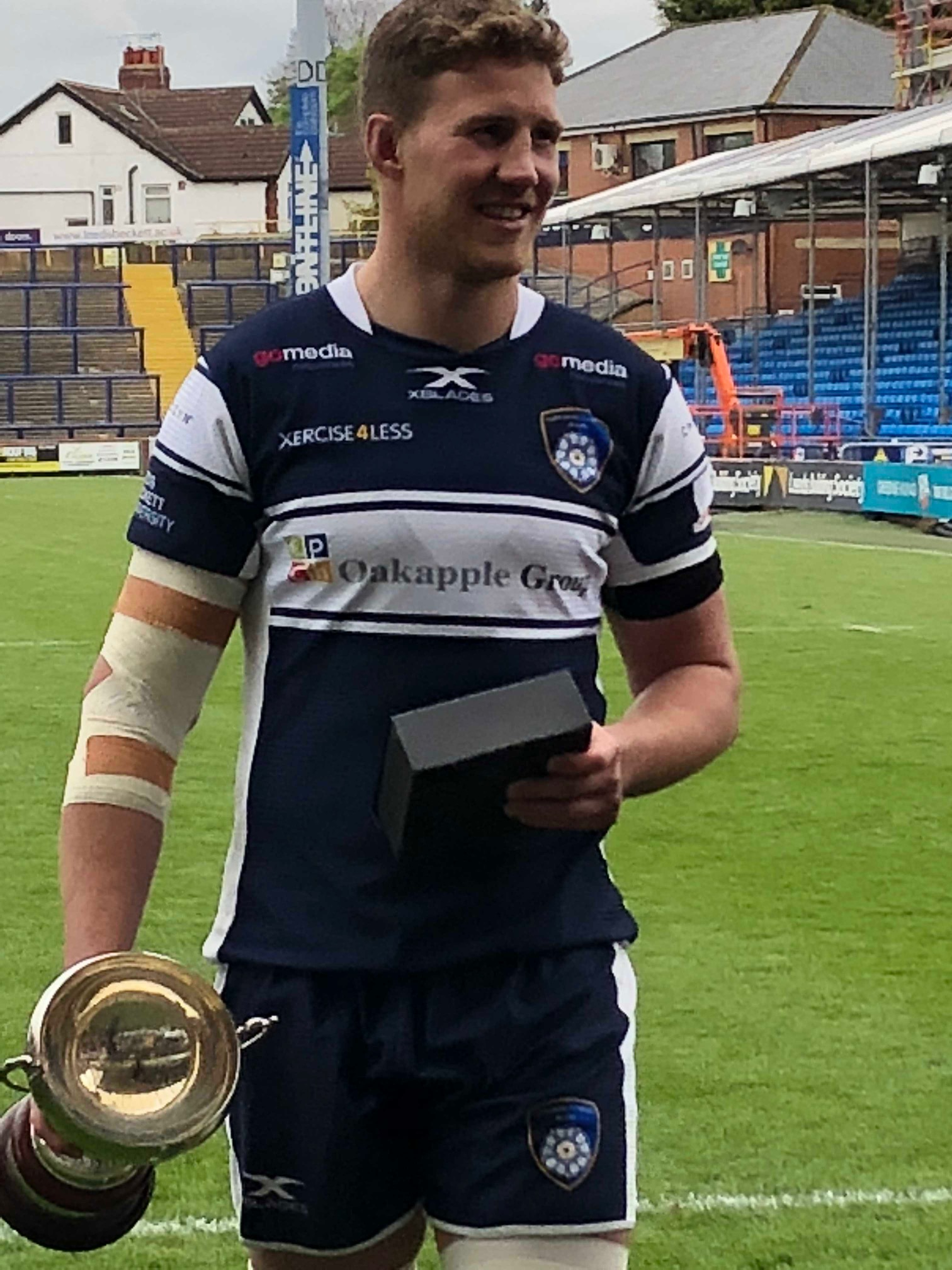
Beck wins Supporter's Player of the Year 2018

Following shoulder surgery in the off season Beck joined Wharfedale R.U.F.C. on loan for a short period before returning to Yorkshire Carnegie for his first match of the 2015–2016 season against Ospreys Premiership Select in the British and Irish Cup. Beck played 18 times for Yorkshire Carnegie in the 2015-2016 scoring two tries. On 2 December 2016 Beck played his 100th game for Yorkshire Carnegie against Bedford Blues at Headingley Carnegie stadium.

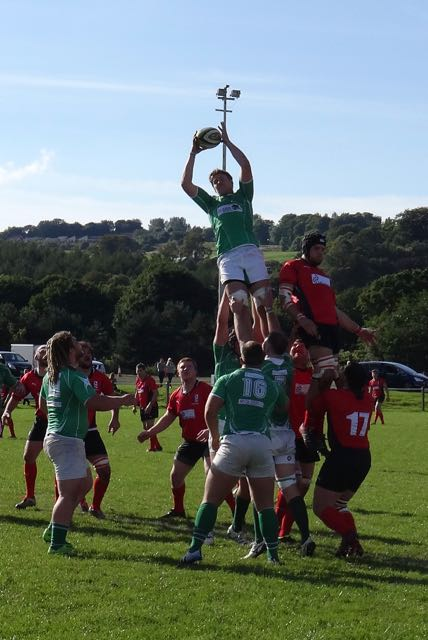
Beck playing for Wharfedale Rugby

In the last game of the 2017–2018 against London Scottish, Beck made his 100th league start becoming only the seventh player in the club's history to reach this milestone. He also picked up the Colin Crampton trophy for Supporter's Player of the Year.

His preferred position was in the back row but he could also play in the Second Row.

On 17 January 2019, Beck announced his retirement from professional rugby on medical grounds. He is one of only nine players to have played over 100 league games for the club having first joined the Academy in 2006. In total he made 132 appearances for Yorkshire Carnegie in all competitions, scoring 14 tries.

== Representative honours ==
Beck has played for Yorkshire and the North of England at under-18 age group and the Yorkshire senior team in the County Championship.

== Coaching roles ==
In June 2019, Beck was appointed Senior Academy Development Coach at Wasps.
