= Uropa Lula =

British pop group

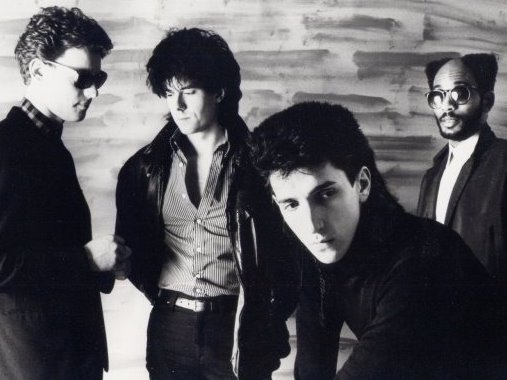
- 1982: Edge, Fromm, Lloyd, Dias

Background information
- Origin: London
- Genres: Pop, synthpop
- Years active: 1980–1983
- Labels: Arista Records, Canada SPG Music
- Past members: David Lloyd; Allan Dias; Pete Fromm; Andrew Edge; Carol Isaacs; Chester Kamen

Uropa Lula were a British pop group, consisting of David Lloyd (vocals and guitar), Allan Dias (bass guitar), Pete Fromm (keyboards), Andrew Edge (drums/percussion), Chester Kamen (guitar), and Carol Isaacs (keyboards). The group were managed by Hilde Swendgaard. The group signed a recording contract with Arista Records in 1982.

== History ==
In 1980, Lloyd formed Uropa Lula with Hilde Swendgaard (manager) and Kevin Smith (drums), making two short films, "Here in the Sun" and "At Night Time" with Video Active. They were joined by Colin Prior (bass) and Peter Fromm (keyboards) in 1981 and began performing live in London, opening for John Cale, Alternative TV and Depeche Mode. American bass player Allan Dias replaced Prior in August of the same year. In September, the band recorded three songs, "Here's a Medal", "Timber Fall" I and "My Black Hour" for the Nicky Horne Capital Radio show. Leeds-born drummer Andrew Edge joined the group later that year. Uropa Lula signed to Arista Records in May 1982 and spent the rest of that year recording album tracks and their first two singles, "Our Love Has Just Begun" and "Fell Upon a Jewel" at Trident Studios, The Manor Studio, Townhouse Studios and RAK Studios. To tie in with the release of the first single, the band recorded a live session for the David Jensen show on Radio 1 for the BBC. The session was produced by Dale Griffin, the English drummer and founding member of 1970s rock band Mott the Hoople and featured two songs, "Here's a Medal" and "Timber Fall I". A month later, Uropa Lula returned to London's Capital Radio to record their second live session for the Nicky Horne show playing two songs, "I Am My Older Brother" and "Leather and Metal (Winter's Here)". In the fall of 1982, guitarist Chester Kamen and keyboard player Carol Isaacs joined the group in time for tours of the UK and US in 1983. The group's opening US show was at the Ritz in New York (1 February 1982). This was followed by dates at the Mudd Club (7 February 1982), the 9:30 Club in Washington, D.C., the New Jersey City Gardens and a show at the Brooklyn Zoo (26 February 1982) where they shared the bill with Holly and the Italians. Upon their return to the UK, on 2 June 1982 the group played at the Camden Palace (now called Koko) and opened for Big Country at the Royal Court Theatre, Liverpool (19 June 1982) and John Cale at The Venue, Victoria, London (5 July 1982). With some irony, the band had by this point changed their name to Viva Lula and as part of the promotion of their third single, "Dad Sings the Blues"; they toured the UK with Big Country in June 1983. Lloyd disbanded the group in October 1983 and embarked on a solo career, albeit continuing to work with Uropa Lula members Kamen, Dias and Smith throughout the 1980s.

== Discography ==
=== Singles ===
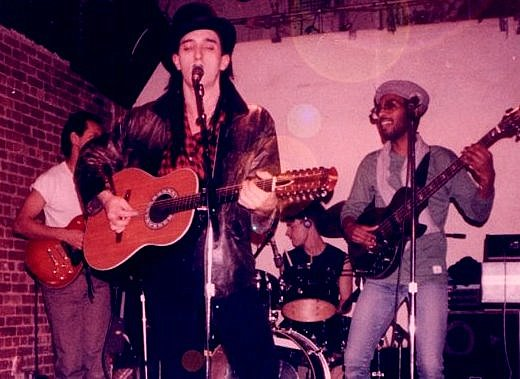
Uropa Lula in New York, 1983: Kamen, Lloyd, Edge, Dias

Arista Records released three singles by the group:

- "Our Love Has Just Begun" b/w "I've Suddenly Remembered Something" (ARIST476, 1982) as Uropa Lula - also featured on Hardest Hits Volume 1 (SPG001), released by SPG Music Productions in 1991
- "Fell Upon a Jewel" b/w "She Appears to Vanish" (ARIST498, 1983) as Uropa Lula
- "Dad Sings the Blues" b/w "Surely There Must Be Some Mistake" (ARIST 540, July 1983) as Viva Lula
