= UEFA Women's Euro 2022 qualifying Group C =

Football tournament qualification stage

Group C of the UEFA Women's Euro 2022 qualifying competition consisted of five teams: Norway, Wales, Belarus, Northern Ireland, and Faroe Islands. The composition of the nine groups in the qualifying group stage was decided by the draw held on 21 February 2019, 13:30 CET (UTC+1), at the UEFA headquarters in Nyon, Switzerland. with the teams seeded according to their coefficient ranking.

The group was played in home-and-away round-robin format between August 2019 and December 2020. The group winners and the three best runners-up among all nine groups (not counting results against the sixth-placed team) qualified directly for the final tournament, while the remaining six runners-up advanced to the play-offs.

On 17 March 2020, all matches were put on hold due to the COVID-19 pandemic.

== Standings ==
Pos	Team	Pld	W	D	L	GF	GA	GD	Pts	Qualification	Norway		Wales	Belarus	Faroe Islands
1	Norway	6	6	0	0	34	1	+33	18	Final tournament	—	6–0	1–0	Canc.	Canc.
2	Northern Ireland	8	4	2	2	17	17	0	14 (Note: Ranked on head-to-head away goals: Northern Ireland 2; Wales 0.)	Play-offs	0–6	—	0–0	3–2	5–1
3	Wales	8	4	2	2	16	4	+12	14		0–1	2–2	—	3–0	4–0
4	Belarus	7	2	0	5	11	15	−4	6		1–7	0–1	0–1	—	6–0
5	Faroe Islands	7	0	0	7	1	42	−41	0		0–13	0–6	0–6	0–2	—

Source: UEFA
Rules for classification: Tiebreakers

== Matches ==
Times are CET/CEST, (Note: CEST (UTC+2) for dates between 31 March and 26 October 2019 and between 29 March and 24 October 2020, and CET (UTC+1) for all other dates.) as listed by UEFA (local times, if different, are in parentheses).

29 August 2019
18:00 (17:00 WEST)

Faroe Islands	0–6	Wales
	Report	Harding 4', 58' (pen.), 79'; Jones 6'; Arge 67' (o.g.); Roberts 90+3'

Tórsvøllur, Tórshavn
Attendance: 733
Referee: Jelena Pejković (Croatia)

30 August 2019
20:45 (19:45 BST)

Northern Ireland	0–6	Norway
	Report	Reiten 4'; Hansen 16', 63', 72'; Eikeland 82', 90'

Seaview, Belfast
Attendance: 1,046
Referee: Veronika Kovarova (Czech Republic)

3 September 2019
19:00 (20:00 FET)

Belarus	6–0	Faroe Islands
Olkhovik 6', 74'; Shcherbachenia 24', 54'; Kharlanova 77' (pen.), 82'	Report

Borisov Arena, Barysaw
Attendance: 2,350
Referee: Jelena Jermolajeva (Latvia)
3 September 2019
20:05 (19:05 BST)

Wales	2–2	Northern Ireland
James 22'; K. Green 69'	Report	Magill 11'; Hutton 90+4'

Rodney Parade, Newport
Attendance: 1,676
Referee: Ainara Andrea Acevedo Dudley (Spain)

4 October 2019
17:45 (18:45 FET)

Belarus	1–7	Norway
Shcherbachenia 18'	Report	Herlovsen 36', 40'; Thorisdottir 45'; Reiten 60'; Hansen 71', 89'; Utland 87'

Borisov Arena, Barysaw
Attendance: 500
Referee: Simona Ghisletta (Switzerland)

8 October 2019
18:00 (17:00 WEST)

Faroe Islands	0–13	Norway
	Report	Utland 8'; Hansen 23' (pen.), 40', 52'; Eikeland 36'; Herlovsen 53', 66', 77'; Sævik 60'; Syrstad Engen 63', 76'; Maanum 65'; Thorsnes 87'

Tórsvøllur, Tórshavn
Attendance: 361
Referee: Galiya Echeva (Bulgaria)
8 October 2019
18:00 (19:00 FET)

Belarus	0–1	Wales
	Report	Rowe 82'

Borisov Arena, Barysaw
Attendance: 300
Referee: Tanja Subotič (Slovenia)

8 November 2019
18:00

Norway	6–0	Northern Ireland
Utland 3', 12'; Reiten 51'; Syrstad Engen 53'; Hansen 70', 90+2'	Report

Viking Stadion, Stavanger
Attendance: 6,709
Referee: Melis Özçiğdem (Turkey)

12 November 2019
20:45 (19:45 GMT)

Northern Ireland	0–0	Wales
	Report

Seaview, Belfast
Attendance: 1,177
Referee: Karoline Wacker (Germany)

18 September 2020
18:00 (17:00 WEST)

Faroe Islands	0–6	Northern Ireland
	Report	Furness 19'; Magill 24', 90'; Wade 27', 56'; K. McGuinness 38'

Tórsvøllur, Tórshavn
Attendance: 0
Referee: Graziella Pirriatore (Italy)

22 September 2020
18:00

Norway	1–0	Wales
Reiten 29'	Report

Ullevaal Stadion, Oslo
Attendance: 0
Referee: Petra Pavlíková (Slovakia)
22 September 2020
18:00 (17:00 WEST)

Faroe Islands	0–2	Belarus
	Report	Shlapakova 56'; Olkhovik 79'

Tórsvøllur, Tórshavn
Attendance: 0
Referee: Abigail Marriott (England)

22 October 2020 (Note: All matches originally scheduled to be played in April and June 2020 were postponed due to the COVID-19 pandemic in Europe. These matches were subsequently rescheduled to be played between October and December 2020.)
17:30 (16:30 BST)

Wales	4–0	Faroe Islands
Ward 33'; Harding 58', 61'; Woodham 67'	Report

Rodney Parade, Newport
Attendance: 0
Referee: Bríet Bragadóttir (Iceland)

27 October 2020
17:30 (16:30 GMT)

Wales	0–1	Norway
	Report	Maanum 61'

Cardiff City Stadium, Cardiff
Attendance: 0
Referee: Marta Frías Acedo (Spain)
27 October 2020
18:00 (19:00 FET)

Belarus	0–1	Northern Ireland
	Report	Furness 42'

Dinamo Stadium, Minsk
Attendance: 362
Referee: Zulema González González (Spain)

26 November 2020
20:00

Norway	Cancelled	Faroe Islands
	Report

Marienlyst Stadion, Drammen

27 November 2020
20:00 (19:00 GMT)

Northern Ireland	3–2	Belarus
K. McGuinness 2'; Furness 61' (pen.); Voskobovich 70' (o.g.)	Report	Shcherbachenia 16', 67'

Seaview, Belfast
Attendance: 0
Referee: Silvia Domingos (Portugal)

1 December 2020
20:00 (19:00 GMT)

Northern Ireland	5–1	Faroe Islands
Furness 6'; K. McGuinness 27'; McCarron 56'; C. McGuinness 77'; Langgaard 88' (o.g.)	Report	Tórolvsdóttir 4'

Seaview, Belfast
Attendance: 0
Referee: Hristiyana Guteva (Bulgaria)
1 December 2020
20:10 (19:10 GMT)

Wales	3–0	Belarus
Harding 15'; Rowe 34'; Fishlock 72' (pen.)	Report

Rodney Parade, Newport
Attendance: 0
Referee: Désirée Grundbacher (Switzerland)

February 2021

Norway	Cancelled	Belarus
	Report

== Goalscorers ==
There were 70 goals scored in 16 matches, for an average of 4.38 goals per match (as of 27 November 2020).

10 goals

- (Norway) Caroline Graham Hansen

6 goals

- (Wales) Natasha Harding

5 goals

- (Belarus) Anastasia Shcherbachenia
- (Norway) Isabell Herlovsen

4 goals

- (Northern Ireland) Rachel Furness
- (Norway) Lisa-Marie Karlseng Utland
- (Norway) Guro Reiten

3 goals

- (Belarus) Karina Olkhovik
- (Northern Ireland) Simone Magill
- (Northern Ireland) Kirsty McGuinness
- (Norway) Amalie Eikeland
- (Norway) Ingrid Syrstad Engen

2 goals

- (Belarus) Anastasiya Kharlanova
- (Northern Ireland) Lauren Wade
- (Norway) Frida Maanum
- (Wales) Rachel Rowe

1 goal

- (Belarus) Anastasiya Shlapakova
- (Faroe Islands) Jensa Kannuberg Tórolvsdóttir
- (Northern Ireland) Ashley Hutton
- (Northern Ireland) Chloe McCarron
- (Northern Ireland) Caitlin McGuinness
- (Norway) Karina Sævik
- (Norway) Maria Thorisdottir
- (Norway) Elise Thorsnes
- (Wales) Jess Fishlock
- (Wales) Kayleigh Green
- (Wales) Angharad James
- (Wales) Emma Jones
- (Wales) Rhiannon Roberts
- (Wales) Helen Ward
- (Wales) Lily Woodham

1 own goal

- (Belarus) Natalia Voskobovich (against Northern Ireland)
- (Faroe Islands) Lív Arge (against Wales)
- (Faroe Islands) Jacoba Langgaard (against Northern Ireland)
