= 2019 in Estonian football =

Football in Estonia
- Season: 2019

Men's football
- Meistriliiga: FC Flora
- Esiliiga: Tallinna JK Legion
- Esiliiga B: FC Nõmme United
- II liiga: Paide Linnameeskond III
- III liiga: Saue JK
- IV liiga: Nõmme Kalju III
- Estonian Cup: JK Narva Trans
- Small Cup: Paide Linnameeskond III
- Supercup: Nõmme Kalju FC

This page summarizes 2019 in Estonian football.

== National team ==
=== Men's ===
==== Senior ====
11 January 2019 Friendly	Finland	1–2	Estonia	Doha, Qatar
14:00 UTC+04	Karjalainen 81'	Report	35' Kams; 62' Anier	Stadium: Khalifa Stadium; Attendance: 200; Referee: (Oman) Khalid Al Shaqsi

15 January 2019 Friendly	Iceland	0–0	Estonia	Doha, Qatar
18:45 UTC+04		Report		Stadium: Jassim bin Hamad Stadium; Referee: (Qatar) Abdulla Ali Al-Marri

21 March 2019 Euro 2020 quali.	Northern Ireland	2–0	Estonia	Belfast, Northern Ireland
21:45 UTC+04	McGinn 56'; Davis 75' (pen.)	Report		Stadium: Windsor Park; Referee: Ivan Bebek (Croatia)

26 March 2019 Friendly	Gibraltar	0–1	Estonia	Gibraltar
21:45 UTC+04		Report	Vassiljev 53'	Stadium: Victoria Stadium; Attendance: 1,900; Referee: Nicolas Walsh

8 June 2019 Euro 2020 quali.	Estonia	1–2	Northern Ireland	A. Le Coq Arena, Tallinn
18:00 (19:00 UTC+3)	Vassiljev 25'	Report	77' Washington; 80' Magennis	Referee: Fabio Verissimo (Portugal)

11 June 2019 Euro 2020 quali.	Germany	8–0	Estonia	Opel Arena, Mainz
20:45	Reus 10', 37'; Gnabry 17', 62'; Goretzka 20'; Gündoğan 26' (pen.); Werner 79'; Sané 88'	Report		Referee: Ali Palabıyık (Turkey)

6 September 2019 Euro 2020 quali.	Estonia	1–2	Belarus	Tallinn, Estonia
20:45	Sorga 54'	Report	48' Naumov; 90+2' Skavysh	Stadium: A. Le Coq Arena; Attendance: 7,314; Referee: Alain Durieux (Luxembourg)

9 September 2019 Euro 2020 quali.	Estonia	0–4	Netherlands	Tallinn, Estonia
21:45		Report	17', 48' Babel; 76' Depay; 87' Wijnaldum	Stadium: A. Le Coq Arena; Attendance: 11,006; Referee: Serhiy Boiko (Ukraine)

10 October 2019 Euro 2020 quali.	Belarus	0–0	Estonia	Minsk, Belarus
19:00 UTC+04		Report		Stadium: Dinamo Stadium; Attendance: 11,300; Referee: Ricardo de Burgos Bengoetxea (Spain)

13 October 2019 Euro 2020 quali.	Estonia	0–3	Germany	Tallinn, Estonia
21:45 UTC+04		Report	Gündoğan 51', 57'; Werner 71'	Stadium: A. le Coq Arena; Attendance: 12,062; Referee: Georgi Kabakov (Bulgaria)

14 November 2019 Friendly	Ukraine	1–0	Estonia	Zaporizhia, Ukraine
19:00 (UTC+2)	Bezus 90+2'	Report		Stadium: Slavutych Arena; Attendance: 11,756; Referee: Juan Martínez Munuera (Spain)

19 November 2019 Euro 2020 quali.	Netherlands	5–0	Estonia	Amsterdam, Netherlands
21:45 UTC+04	Wijnaldum 6', 66', 79'; Aké 19'; Boadu 87'	Report		Stadium: Johan Cruyff Arena; Attendance: 50,386; Referee: Davide Massa (Italy)

==== Under-23 ====
5 June 2019 Friendly	Estonia	2–0	England	Tallinn, Estonia
19:00 UTC+04	Poom 89'; Usta 90+7'	Report		Stadium: Kadriorg Stadium; Attendance: 264; Referee: Kristo Tohver

==== Under-21 ====
21 March 2019 Friendly	Estonia	0–0	Ukraine	Belek, Turkey
14:00 UTC+04		Report

24 March 2019 Friendly	Kazakhstan	1–2	Estonia	Belek, Turkey
16:00 UTC+04	Kusyapov 47'	Report	Uljanov 77'; Lipp 85'

26 March 2019 Friendly	Estonia	1–1	North Macedonia	Belek, Turkey
16:00 UTC+04	Lipp 44'	Report	Unknown 26'

5 September 2019 Euro 2021 quali.	Estonia	0–4	Bulgaria	Tallinn, Estonia
17:30 UTC+04		Report	Yordanov 14', 48', 65'; Ivanov 39'	Stadium: Kadriorg Stadium; Referee: Milovan Milačić (Montenegro)

10 September 2019 Euro 2021 quali.	Poland	4–0	Estonia	Białystok, Poland
18:00 UTC+04	Płacheta 6'; Fila 65'; Jóźwiak 80'; Dziczek 90+4' (pen.)	Report		Stadium: Białystok City Stadium; Referee: Rohit Saggi (Norway)

11 October 2019 Euro 2021 quali.	Estonia	2–1	Latvia	Pärnu, Estonia
18:15 (19:15 EEST)	Soomets 11'; Valge 24'	Report	Regža 18'	Stadium: Pärnu Rannastaadion; Attendance: 247; Referee: Rauf Jabarov (Azerbaijan)

15 October 2019 Euro 2021 quali.	Estonia	0–5	Russia	Pärnu, Estonia
18:15 (19:15 EEST)		Report	Chalov 26'; Glushenkov 35'; Glebov 65'; Krugovoy 69'; Kalugin 75'	Stadium: Pärnu Rannastaadion; Attendance: 403; Referee: Nikolas Neokleous (Cyprus)

15 November 2019 Euro 2021 quali.	Serbia	6−0	Estonia	Niš, Serbia
19:00 UTC+04	L. Ilić 12'; Joveljić 20', 52', 61'; I. Ilić 38'; Tedić 87'	Report		Stadium: Čair Stadium; Attendance: 504; Referee: Nathan Verboomen (Belgium)

==== Under-19 ====
26 March 2019 Friendly	Switzerland	0–1	Estonia	Zürich, Switzerland
16:00 UTC+04		Report	Tunjov 86'

6 June 2019 Baltic Cup	Estonia	0–2	Finland	Tartu, Estonia
18:00 UTC+04		Report	Sejdiu 42'; Tolonen 46'	Stadium: Tartu Tamme Stadium; Attendance: 174; Referee: Roomer Tarajev

7 June 2019 Baltic Cup	Lithuania	0–0	Estonia	Tartu, Estonia
18:00 UTC+04		Report		Stadium: Tartu Tamme Stadium; Attendance: 78; Referee: Siim Rinken

9 June 2019 Baltic Cup	Estonia	0–3	Latvia	Võru, Estonia
13:00 UTC+04		Report	Dusalijevs 31'; Krollis 88', 90+1'	Stadium: Võru Spordikeskuse staadion Attendance: 85; Referee: Andrei Karhu

18 August 2019 Friendly	Papua New Guinea	1–1 (4–5 p)	Estonia	Port Vila, Vanuatu
14:00 UTC+04	Rani 21'	Report	Iljin 90'	Stadium: Korman Stadium; Attendance: 800; Referee: Ben Aukwai (Solomon Islands)

21 August 2019 Friendly	Estonia	0–1	Tahiti	Port Vila, Vanuatu
14:00 UTC+04		Report	Holozet 78' (pen.)	Stadium: Korman Stadium; Attendance: 800; Referee: Veer Singh (Fiji)

24 August 2019 Friendly	Estonia	1–0	New Caledonia	Port Vila, Vanuatu
00:00 UTC+04	Luts 90'	Report		Stadium: Korman Stadium; Attendance: 500; Referee: Ben Aukwai (Solomon Islands)

7 September 2019 Friendly	Belarus	2–1	Estonia	Minsk, Belarus
17:00 UTC+04	Rouda 30'; Kozel 83'	Report	K. Lepik 52'

9 September 2019 Friendly	Belarus	5–0	Estonia	Minsk, Belarus
17:00 UTC+04	Kozel 6', 13'; Dzemchanka 26'; Adamchyk 37'; Nikifatenka 87'	Report		Stadium: Traktor Stadium

12 October 2019 Friendly	Estonia	0–3	Russia	Tallinn, Estonia
15:00 UTC+04		Report	Prokhin 23'; Gerchikov 57'; Mazurin 75'	Stadium: Sportland Arena; Attendance: 215; Referee: Roomer Tarajev

14 October 2019 Friendly	Estonia	0–6	Russia	Tallinn, Estonia
18:00 UTC+04		Report	Petrov 5', 72'; Sevikyan 7'; Kutovoi 19', 37'; Bykovskii 29'	Stadium: Sportland Arena; Attendance: 110; Referee: Grigori Ošomkov

13 November 2019 Euro 2020 quali.	Ukraine	4–0	Estonia	Sandviken, Sweden
13:00 UTC+04	Mudryk 38'; Shulianskyi 45'; Sikan 63' (pen.); Hirnyi 77'	Report		Stadium: Jernvallen

16 November 2019 Euro 2020 quali.	Sweden	4–0	Estonia	Sandviken, Sweden
13:00 UTC+04	Nygren 32', 67'; Suvinõmm 69' (o.g.); Hajal 71'	Report		Stadium: Jernvallen

19 November 2019 Euro 2020 quali.	Estonia	0–7	Slovenia	Sandviken, Sweden
13:00 UTC+04		Report	Simič 41', 57'; Maher 45+1'; Cipot 50'; Prelec 69', 81', 86'	Stadium: Jernvallen

==== Under-18 ====
13 October 2019 Friendly	Georgia	3–0	Estonia	Tbilisi, Georgia
14:00 UTC+04	56'; 77'; 90'	Report

15 October 2019 Friendly	Georgia	2–0	Estonia	Tbilisi, Georgia
14:00 UTC+04	Ogbaidze 46'; Pachulia 88'	Report		Attendance: 115; Referee: George Vadachkoria

==== Under-17 ====
19 March 2019 Friendly	Estonia	0–4	France	Tallinn, Estonia
17:00 UTC+04		Report	Capon 12', 15'; Abline 34'; da Silva 86'	Stadium: Sportland Arena; Attendance: 223; Referee: Kristo Külljastinen

21 March 2019 Friendly	Estonia	2–1	France	Tallinn, Estonia
17:00 UTC+04	Tohver 46'; Liit 62'	Report	da Silva 89'	Stadium: Sportland Arena; Attendance: 158; Referee: Grigori Ošomkov

22 April 2019 Friendly	Estonia	7–0	Liechtenstein	Tallinn, Estonia
17:00 UTC+04	Tarassenkov 3', 64'; Kuraksin 8'; Ivanov 23'; Šapovalov 40', 50' (pen.); Usta 80+2'	Report		Stadium: Sportland Arena; Attendance: 148; Referee: Jagnar Jakobson

24 April 2019 Friendly	Estonia	5–0	Faroe Islands	Tallinn, Estonia
17:00 UTC+04	Viidas 13'; Usta 39', 65'; Vetkal 40+2'; Smirnov 68'	Report		Stadium: Sportland Arena; Attendance: 143; Referee: Grigori Ošomkov

26 April 2019 Friendly	Lithuania	0–2	Estonia	Tallinn, Estonia
13:00 UTC+04		Report	Kuraksin 40'; Usta 76'	Stadium: Sportland Arena; Attendance: 119; Referee: Tanel Üprus

29 June 2019 Baltic Cup	Estonia	0–2	Finland	Tartu, Estonia
13:00 UTC+04		Report	Stjopin 17'; Walta 49'	Stadium: Tartu Tamme Stadium; Attendance: 131; Referee: Marko Liiva

30 June 2019 Baltic Cup	Lithuania	1–1	Estonia	Tartu, Estonia
13:00 UTC+04	Jarusevicius 69' (pen.)	Report	Kallas 75'	Stadium: Tartu Tamme Stadium; Attendance: 87; Referee: Roomer Tarajev

2 July 2019 Baltic Cup	Estonia	2–1	Latvia	Võru, Estonia
13:00 UTC+04	Šapovalov 35', 41'	Report	Puzirevskis 80'	Stadium: Võru Spordikeskuse staadion Attendance: 72; Referee: Marko Liiva

27 August 2019 Friendly	Estonia	3–1	Sweden	Tallinn, Estonia
17:00 UTC+04	Paskotši 19'; Usta 44'; Kuraksin 51'	Report	Navik 12'	Stadium: TNTK Stadium; Attendance: 186; Referee: Reelika Turi

29 August 2019 Friendly	Estonia	0–1	Sweden	Tallinn, Estonia
17:00 UTC+04		Report	Navik 88'	Stadium: TNTK Stadium; Attendance: 151; Referee: Joonas Jaanovits

20 September 2019 Friendly tournament	Portugal	2–0	Estonia	Tartu, Estonia
19:00 UTC+04	Resende 8'; Gomes 30'	Report		Stadium: Tamme Stadium; Attendance: 585; Referee: (Austria) Christopher Jaeger

22 September 2019 Friendly tournament	Estonia	0–2	Slovenia	Otepää, Estonia
17:00 UTC+04		Report	Begic 33'; Perc 62'	Stadium: Tehvandi Stadium; Referee: (Greece) Athanasios Tzilos

24 September 2019 Friendly tournament	Spain	2–3	Estonia	Tartu, Estonia
17:00 UTC+04	Iglesias 30'; Salazar 36'	Report	Kokka 57', 61'; Šapovalov 83'	Stadium: Tamme Stadium; Attendance: 529; Referee: (Denmark) Peter Kjaersgaard

==== Under-16 ====
19 August 2019 Friendly	Northern Ireland	2–0	Estonia	Belfast, Northern Ireland
18:45 UTC+04	Spencer 27'; McDonnell 34'	Report		Stadium: Breda Park; Referee: Jonny Reid

21 August 2019 Friendly	Northern Ireland	5–2	Estonia	Dungannon, Northern Ireland
19:00 UTC+04	Lindsay 4', 49'; Deane 20'; Virkus 58' (o.g.); Forbes 68'	Report	Kaupmees 36'; Kondratski 67'	Stadium: Stangmore Park; Attendance: 57; Referee: Mark Ward

=== Women's ===
==== Senior ====
27 February 2019 Aphrodite Cup	Estonia	0–0	Malta	Cyprus
10:00 UTC+04		Report		Attendance: 10; Referee: (Cyprus) Ioanna Allayiotov

28 February 2019 Aphrodite Cup	Lithuania	0–1	Estonia	Cyprus
10:00 UTC+04		Report	Bannikova 45'	Attendance: 4 Referee: (Cyprus) Loukas Sotoriou

2 March 2019 Aphrodite Cup	Cyprus	1–0	Estonia	Cyprus
12:15 UTC+04	Violari 39'	Report		Attendance: 50; Referee: (Cyprus) Ioanna Allayiotou

3 April 2019 Friendly	Azerbaijan	0–1	Estonia	Baku, Azerbaijan
15:30 UTC+04		Report	Merisalu 2'	Stadium: Dalga Arena; Attendance: 100; Referee: (Azerbaijan) Rahim Hasanov

6 April 2019 Friendly	Azerbaijan	0–0	Estonia	Baku, Azerbaijan
11:00 UTC+04		Report		Stadium: Dalga Arena; Attendance: 100; Referee: (Azerbaijan) Aliyar Agayev

14 June 2019 Baltic Cup	Latvia	3–0	Estonia	Riga, Latvia
18:00 UTC+03	Miksone 56'; Voitāne 76'; Zaičikova 79'	Report		Stadium: Arkādija Stadium; Attendance: 150; Referee: Rasa Imanalijeva (Lithuania)

15 June 2019 Baltic Cup	Estonia	0–2	Lithuania	Baldone, Latvia
14:00 UTC+03		Report	Žižytė 78'; Mažukėlytė 89'	Stadium: Baldone Stadium; Attendance: 22; Referee: Jeļena Jermolajeva (Latvia)

18 June 2019 Friendly	Estonia	0–1	Belarus	Tallinn, Estonia
17:30 UTC+03		Report	Linnik 42'	Stadium: Kadriorg Stadium; Attendance: 213; Referee: Jeļena Jermolajeva (Latvia)

30 August 2019 Euro 2021 quali.	Estonia	0–7	Netherlands	Tallinn, Estonia
19:00 (UTC+3)		Report	Miedema 27', 69'; Roord 31'; Spitse 40', 51'; Bloodworth 81'; E. Jansen 85'	Stadium: A. Le Coq Arena; Attendance: 1,881; Referee: Olga Zadinová (Czech Republic)

3 September 2019 Euro 2021 quali.	Russia	4–0	Estonia	Moscow, Russia
19:00 (UTC+3)	Korovkina 10', 57'; Fedorova 29'; Myagkova 82'	Report		Stadium: Sapsan Arena; Referee: Katalin Sipos (Hungary)

4 October 2019 Euro 2021 quali.	Turkey	0–0	Estonia	Istanbul, Turkey
16:00 (UTC+3)		Report		Stadium: Sancaktepe Stadium; Referee: Marta Frías (Spain)

8 October 2019 Euro 2021 quali.	Estonia	1–2	Kosovo	Tartu, Estonia
19:15 (UTC+3)	Loo 22' (pen.)	Report	Uka 41', 56'	Stadium: Tamme Stadium; Attendance: 377; Referee: Iuliana Demetrescu (Romania)

7 November 2019 Friendly	Belarus	2–0	Estonia	Minsk, Belarus
17:00 (UTC+3)	Shcherbachenia 12'; Linnik 40' (pen.)	Report		Stadium: Krytyj futbolnyj Manesh; Attendance: 100; Referee: Olga Tereshko (Belarus)

10 November 2019 Friendly	Belarus	0–0	Estonia	Minsk, Belarus
15:00 (UTC+3)		Report		Stadium: Krytyj futbolnyj Manesh; Attendance: 75; Referee: Vitaliy Onikhimovskiy (Belarus)

==== U19 ====
27 June 2019 Baltic Cup	Lithuania	2–0	Estonia	Marijampolė, Lithuania
17:00 UTC+03	Saulus 51' (o.g.); Šafranovic 55'	Report		Stadium: Sūduva Stadium; Attendance: 50; Referee: Robertas Valikonis (Lithuania)

28 June 2019 Baltic Cup	Estonia	0–0	Latvia	Marijampolė, Lithuania
14:00 UTC+03		Report		Stadium: Sūduva Stadium; Attendance: 20; Referee: Robertas Valikonis (Lithuania)

2 October 2019 Euro 2020 quali.	Italy	5–0	Estonia	Siena, Italy
15:00	Bragonzi 1', 50'; Anghileri 4'; Boglioni 54'; Landa 62'	Report		Stadium: Stadio Artemio Franchi – Montepaschi Arena; Referee: Neslihan Muratdagi (Turkey)

5 October 2019 Euro 2020 quali.	Russia	6–0	Estonia	Cortona, Italy
12:00	Petrova 24'; Abdullina 42' (pen.); Trenkina 50'; Kozik 59'; Lazareva 61', 84'	Report		Stadium: Stadio Comunale Santi Tiezzi; Referee: Emilie Dokset (Norway)

8 October 2019 Euro 2020 quali.	Estonia	0–5	Slovenia	Cortona, Italy
15:00		Report	Milovič 43'; Potočnik 56'; Kastelec 65', 90', 90+5'	Stadium: Stadio Comunale Santi Tiezzi; Referee: Neslihan Muratdagi (Turkey)

=== Futsal ===
15 January 2019 Friendly	Denmark	3–3	Estonia	Denmark
19:00 UTC+04	Scott 4'; El-Ouaz 14'; Aleksejev 35' (o.g.)	Report	Grigorjev 5'; Stüf 9', 16'	Stadium: Aarhus Ceres Arena; Referee: Martin Koster

16 January 2019 Friendly	Denmark	4–2	Estonia	Denmark
19:00 UTC+04	Larsen 3', 7', 15'; Badran 14'	Report	Tšernei 5'; Grigorjev 34'	Stadium: Aarhus Ceres Arena; Referee: David Nissen

30 January 2019 World Cup 2020 quali.	Netherlands	4–1	Estonia	Palace of Culture and Sports, Varna
18:00 (19:00 EET)	Velseboer 6:01, 34:28, 36:09; Zerouali 24:05	Report	Stüf 5:35	Referee: Javier Moreno Reina (Spain), Daniele D'adamo (San Marino)

31 January 2019 World Cup 2020 quali.	Bulgaria	3–2	Estonia	Palace of Culture and Sports, Varna
15:45 (16:45 EET)	Baharov 27:08; Tsvetanov 32:19, 38:49	Report	Titenok 5:51; Kostin 30:37	Referee: Daniele D'adamo (San Marino), Costas Nicolaou (Cyprus)

2 February 2019 World Cup 2020 quali.	Estonia	0–4	Montenegro	Palace of Culture and Sports, Varna
15:45 (16:45 EET)		Report	Mugoša 20:13; Obradović 25:12; Barović 31:47; Ćorović 33:15	Referee: Daniele D'adamo (San Marino), Hikmat Qafarli (Azerbaijan)

== League system ==
=== Men ===
==== Meistriliiga ====
Ten teams will compete in the league, nine sides from the 2018 season and 2018 Esiliiga champions Maardu Linnameeskond. Vaprus were relegated at the end of the 2018 season after finishing in the bottom of the table. Maardu Linnameeskond will be making their Meistriliiga debut having previously declined promotion after winning the 2017 Esiliiga. Kuressaare retained their Meistriliiga spot after winning a relegation playoff against Esiliiga runners-up Elva.

On the 27th of October it was mathematically confirmed that FC Flora regained the title after one season. In the second to last round it was confirmed that newcomer Maardu Linnameeskond will be relegated after its debut season and that Paide Linnameeskond, who spent most of the season in the top three, will finish fourth. During the final round, JK Tallinna Kalev managed to escape the relegation play-offs spot and therefore FC Kuressaare had to take that place. They competed against Esiliiga's second independent team Pärnu JK Vaprus and defeated them in a home-and-away play-off. The season's top goalscorer was Erik Sorga, while the best player and assister was Konstantin Vassiljev. Flora's manager Jürgen Henn was awarded the Albert Vollrat's trophy (best manager of the year).

Pos	Team	Pld	W	D	L	GF	GA	GD	Pts	Qualification or relegation
1	Flora (C)	36	29	3	4	110	21	+89	90	Qualification for the Champions League first qualifying round
2	FCI Levadia	36	24	6	6	98	32	+66	78	Qualification for the Europa League first qualifying round
3	Nõmme Kalju	36	22	11	3	79	34	+45	77	Qualification for the Europa League first qualifying round
4	Paide Linnameeskond	36	23	5	8	78	30	+48	74	Qualification for the Europa League first qualifying round
5	Tammeka	36	14	7	15	57	62	−5	49	
6	Narva Trans	36	13	9	14	57	49	+8	48	
7	Tulevik	36	7	7	22	35	75	−40	28	
8	Tallinna Kalev	36	6	6	24	29	89	−60	24	
9	Kuressaare (O)	36	6	5	25	24	87	−63	23	Qualification for the Relegation play-offs
10	Maardu Linnameeskond (R)	36	4	5	27	30	118	−88	17	Relegation to the Esiliiga

Source: Estonian Football Association (in Estonian), UEFA
Rules for classification: 1) Points; 2) Less matches awarded against; 3) Head-to-head points; 4) Head-to-head goal difference; 5) Matches won; 6) Goal difference; 7) Goals scored; 8) Away goals scored; 9) Fairplay ranking.
(C) Champions; (O) Play-off winners; (R) Relegated

==== Esiliiga ====
A total of 10 teams were contesting the league, including 6 sides from the 2018 season, one relegated from 2018 Meistriliiga and three promoted from the 2018 Esiliiga B. The 2017 Esiliiga and 2018 Esiliiga champions Maardu Linnameeskond got promoted to the highest tier for the first time. Nõmme Kalju FC U21 was the first team to suffer relegation after just returning to Esiliiga. Keila JK also immediately returned to Esiliiga B after losing the relegation play-offs to Kohtla-Järve JK Järve. JK Tallinna Kalev U21 narrowly avoided getting relegated in their debut season thanks to Tartu FC Santos' decision to start the new season in the fourth tier. The other two teams getting promoted were Tallinna JK Legion, who went almost unbeaten in their previous season, and Tartu JK Tammeka U21, who will be making their debut in Esiliiga.

Pos	Team	Pld	W	D	L	GF	GA	GD	Pts	Promotion, qualification or relegation
1	Legion (C, P)	36	29	4	3	127	35	+92	91	Promotion to the Meistriliiga
2	Flora U21 (Note: Reserve teams are ineligible for promotion.)	36	22	7	7	85	37	+48	73	
3	Vaprus	36	21	4	11	73	48	+25	67	Qualification for promotion play-offs
4	Tammeka U21	36	18	4	14	59	55	+4	58	
5	Elva	36	18	2	16	67	63	+4	56	
6	FCI Levadia U21	36	16	5	15	80	65	+15	53	
7	Järve	36	12	4	20	51	82	−31	40	
8	Tarvas (R)	36	8	4	24	35	98	−63	28	Qualification for relegation play-offs
9	Tallinna Kalev U21 (R)	36	8	4	24	38	82	−44	28	Relegation to the Esiliiga B
10	Welco (R)	36	6	6	24	39	89	−50	24	Relegation to the Esiliiga B

Rules for classification: 1) Points; 2) Less matches awarded against; 3) Head-to-head points; 4) Head-to-head goal difference; 5) Matches won; 6) Goal difference; 7) Goals scored; 8) Away goals scored; 9) Fairplay ranking.
(C) Champions; (P) Promoted; (R) Relegated

==== Esiliiga B ====
Of the 10 participating teams 5 remained following the 2018 Esiliiga B. The 2018 champions Legion, runners-up Tammeka U21 and 3rd placed Järve were promoted to Esiliiga, while 9th and 10th placed Ajax and Flora U19 were relegated to II liiga. They are replaced by Viimsi JK, who returned after a year in the lower leagues, Põhja-Tallinna JK Volta and Tabasalu JK, who are making their debut in the top leagues. Volta and Viimsi both finished the last season on top of their leagues and Tabasalu defeated Ajax in the play-offs. The teams which were relegated from higher tiers were Nõmme Kalju FC U21 and Keila JK, who both got to play a season in Esiliiga. Keila lost in the play-offs against Järve.

Pos	Team	Pld	W	D	L	GF	GA	GD	Pts	Promotion, qualification or relegation
1	Nõmme United (C, P)	36	27	4	5	118	38	+80	85	Promotion to the Esiliiga
2	Vändra (P)	36	21	5	10	97	71	+26	68	Promotion to the Esiliiga
3	Pärnu Jalgpalliklubi (O, P)	36	19	5	12	82	53	+29	62	Qualification for promotion play-offs
4	Nõmme Kalju U21	36	19	4	13	79	50	+29	61	
5	Viimsi	36	16	4	16	75	68	+7	52	
6	Keila	36	14	4	18	67	87	−20	46	
7	Tabasalu	36	13	4	19	77	79	−2	43	
8	Paide Linnameeskond U21	36	11	6	19	61	87	−26	39	
9	Helios	36	10	4	22	48	101	−53	34	
10	Volta (R)	36	9	2	25	53	123	−70	29	Relegation to the II liiga

Source: Soccerway (in English), Esiliiga B (in Estonian)
Rules for classification: 1) Points; 2) Less matches awarded against; 3) Head-to-head points; 4) Head-to-head goal difference; 5) Matches won; 6) Goal difference; 7) Goals scored; 8) Away goals scored; 9) Fairplay ranking.
(C) Champions; (O) Play-off winners; (P) Promoted; (R) Relegated

==== II liiga ====
North/East
- Dates: 22 March - 26 October
- Matches: 146
- Goals: 602 (4.12 per match)
- Top goalscorer: Sander Pabo (19 goals each)
- Total attendance: 5,248
- Average attendance: 36

South/West
- Dates: 22 March - 26 October
- Matches: 146
- Goals: 617 (4.23 per match)
- Top goalscorer: Juhan Jograf Siim (26 goals)
- Total attendance: 5,077
- Average attendance: 36

Group A (North & East)
Pos	Team	Pld	Pts
1	FCI Tallinn (C)	26	64
2	Sillamäe Kalev	26	59
3	Narva Trans II	26	56
4	Tallinna Legion II	26	55
5	Maardu Linnameeskond II	26	41
6	Tartu Welco II	26	41
7	Põhja-Tallinna Volta II	26	32
8	Kohtla-Järve Järve II	26	29
9	Tartu Tammeka III	26	27
10	Jõgeva Noorus-96	26	27
11	Lasnamäe Ajax	26	27
12	Tallinna Ararat	26	27
13	Jõgeva Wolves (R)	26	19
14	Tartu Santos (R)	26	15

(C) Champions; (R) Relegated

Group B (South & West)
Pos	Team	Pld	Pts
1	Paide Linnameeskond III (C)	26	64
2	Tallinna Kalev III	26	56
3	Läänemaa	26	49
4	Kuressaare II	26	47
5	Tallinna Piraaja	26	39
6	Põhja-Sakala	26	38
7	Pärnu Vaprus II	26	36
8	Flora U19	26	34
9	Raplamaa	26	32
10	Viimsi II	26	31
11	Raasiku Joker	26	27
12	Pärnu Poseidon	26	26
13	Viljandi Tulevik U21	26	25
14	Kose (R)	26	18

(C) Champions; (R) Relegated

==== III liiga ====
Group A (North)
Pos	Team	Pld	Pts
1	Harju Laagri (C, P)	22	54
2	Lilleküla Retro	22	45
3	Tallinna Zapoos	22	44
4	Tallinna Eston Villa	22	42
5	Saku Sporting	22	35
6	Tallinna Hell Hunt	22	33
7	Maarjamäe Igiliikur	22	29
8	Rumori Calcio	22	26
9	Tallinna Zenit	22	25
10	Tallinna Dünamo	22	20
11	Tallinna Olympic Olybet (R)	22	17
12	Tallinna Štrommi (R)	22	13

(C) Champions; (P) Promoted; (R) Relegated

Group B (South)
Pos	Team	Pld	Pts
1	Otepää (C, P)	22	58
2	Tartu Helios	22	49
3	Tarvastu and Tõrva ÜM	22	44
4	Valga Warrior	22	43
5	Vastseliina	22	40
6	EMÜ	22	29
7	Võru Helios II	22	28
8	Elva II	22	28
9	Tartu Welco X	22	23
10	Tartu Tammeka IV	22	12
11	SK Illi and Jõgeva Noorus-96 ÜM (R)	22	11
12	Äksi Wolves (R)	22	9

(C) Champions; (P) Promoted; (R) Relegated

Group C (East)
Pos	Team	Pld	Pts
1	Tallinn (C, P)	22	58
2	Türi Ganvix	22	47
3	Paide Linnameeskond IV	22	46
4	Järva-Jaani	22	38
5	Koeru	22	34
6	Maardu Aliens	22	33
7	Loo	22	32
8	Sillamäe	22	29
9	Kadrina	22	19
10	Anija	22	18
11	Põhja-Tallinna Volta III (R)	22	16
12	Tallinna Augur (R)	22	10

(C) Champions; (P) Promoted; (R) Relegated

Group D (West)
Pos	Team	Pld	Pts
1	Saue (C, P)	22	64
2	Pärnu II	22	43
3	Hiiumaa	22	42
4	Kernu Kadakas	22	39
5	Keila II	22	38
6	Rummu Dünamo	22	36
7	Kohila Püsivus	22	27
8	Pakri Alexela	22	26
9	Märjamaa Kompanii	22	25
10	Pärnu Poseidon II	22	19
11	Haapsalu (R)	22	14
12	Saaremaa aameraaS (R)	22	10

(C) Champions; (P) Promoted; (R) Relegated

==== IV liiga ====
Group A (North)
Pos	Team	Pld	Pts
1	Nõmme Kalju III	10	23
2	Tallinna TransferWise	10	18
3	Tallinna Eston Villa II	10	15
4	Toompea	10	14
5	Tallinna Wolves	10	7
6	Tallinna Soccernet	10	7

Group B (North & East)
Pos	Team	Pld	Pts
1	Viimsi Lõvid	10	24
2	Kristiine	10	22
3	Tallinna Reaal	10	19
4	Tallinna Piraaja II	10	16
5	Tallinna Jalgpallihaigla	10	4
6	Kuusalu Kalev	10	3

Group C (South)
Pos	Team	Pld	Pts
1	Lelle	10	24
2	Põhja-Sakala II	10	22
3	Tartu TRT77	10	13
4	Kohtla-Järve Järve III	10	11
5	Põlva Lootos	10	9
6	Kose II	10	6

Group A (First tier)
Pos	Team	Pld	Pts
1	Nõmme Kalju III	10	21
2	Viimsi Lõvid	10	20
3	Lelle	10	17
4	Kristiine	10	14
5	Põhja-Sakala II	10	8
6	Tallinna TransferWise	10	5

Group B (Second tier)
Pos	Team	Pld	Pts
1	Tallinna Reaal	10	20
2	Kohtla-Järve Järve III	10	19
3	Tartu TRT77	10	13
4	Tallinna Piraaja II	10	13
5	Tallinna Eston Villa II	10	12
6	Toompea	10	10

Group C (Third tier)
Pos	Team	Pld	Pts
1	Tallinna Jalgpallihaigla	10	23
2	Tallinna Soccernet	10	18
3	Tallinna Wolves	10	18
4	Kuusalu Kalev	10	13
5	Põlva Lootos	10	10
6	Kose II	10	6

=== Post-season games ===
==== League winners ====
II liiga

Final
Paide Linnameeskond III (II S/W 1st)	1 (6)
FCI Tallinn (II N/E 1st)	1 (5)

Home teams listed on top of bracket. (AET): At Extra Time

III liiga

Semifinals
Saue JK (III W 1st)	1 (4)
FC Otepää (III S 1st)	1 (3)
FC Tallinn (III E 1st)	3
Harju JK Laagri (III N 1st)	–

Final
Saue JK (III W 1st)	1
FC Tallinn (III E 1st)	0

Home teams listed on top of bracket. (AET): At Extra Time

IV liiga

In 2019 the competition did not have a "final match" between the divisions best clubs, because of the format change which put the tier's top six teams in the same group. This meant that the teams had the chance to play with all of their rival clubs and a separate final was not needed. The league was won by Nõmme Kalju III.

==== Promotion & Relegation play-offs ====
To Meistriliiga

Team 1	Agg.	Team 2	1st leg	2nd leg
Pärnu Vaprus (Esiliiga 3rd)	3–5	Kuressaare (Meistriliiga 9th)	1–4	2–1

To Esiliiga

Team 1	Agg.	Team 2	1st leg	2nd leg
Pärnu (Esiliiga B 3rd)	7–2	Rakvere Tarvas (Esiliiga 8th)	3–2	4–0

To Esiliiga B

Team 1	Agg.	Team 2	1st leg	2nd leg
Läänemaa (II S/W 2nd)	1–4	Sillamäe Kalev (II N/E 2nd)	0–2	1–2

- The play-off between Esiliiga B's 8th team (Paide Linnameeskond U21) and first round winner (Sillamäe Kalev) was not held, because FCI Tallinn and JK Tallinna Kalev III (teams, who were supposed to be promoted) both turned down the possibility and so Esiliiga B's 8th and 9th (Võru Helios) were saved from relegation.

To II liiga

Team 1	Agg.	Team 2	1st leg	2nd leg
Tartu Helios (III S 2nd)	w/o	Pärnu II (III W 2nd)	+:–	+:–
Tartu Helios (III S 2nd)	w/o	Pärnu Poseidon (II S/W 12th)	7–2	+:–

Team 1	Agg.	Team 2	1st leg	2nd leg
Lilleküla Retro (III N 2nd)	w/o	Türi Ganvix (III E 2nd)	X	X
–	w/o	Tallinna Ararat (II N/E 12th)	X	X

To III liiga

Team 1	Agg.	Team 2	1st leg	2nd leg
Tartu TRT77 (IV liiga 3rd)	5–5	Tartu Tammeka IV (III S 10th)	2–2	3–3

=== Women ===
League	Promoted to league	Relegated from league
Naiste Meistriliiga	JK Tulevik ja Suure-Jaani Unitedi ÜN^{3} / Saku Sporting	Tallinna FC Ajax / FC Levadia Tallinn^{2}
Naiste Esiliiga	Tartu JK Tammeka II / Tallinna JK Legion	FC Kuressaare^{1}
Naiste Teine liiga	Pärnu JK Vaprus^{4} / Põlva FC Lootos II^{4}	Rakvere JK Tarvas^{2}

1. Club did not want to compete in Esiliiga and decided to join II liiga.
2. Club did not enter the Championship.
3. Club got the chance to play in II liiga, because some other teams from the higher division or on higher positions last season chose not to.
4. Club is making its debut

==== Naiste Meistriliiga ====
Pos	Team	Pld	W	D	L	GF	GA	GD	Pts	Promotion, qualification or relegation
1	FC Flora	14	13	1	0	85	4	+81	40	Qualification for the Championship round
2	Pärnu JK	14	11	2	1	58	7	+51	35	Qualification for the Championship round
3	JK Tallinna Kalev	14	9	0	5	34	21	+13	27	Qualification for the Championship round
4	Saku Sporting	14	6	1	7	33	30	+3	19	Qualification for the Championship round
5	Põlva FC Lootos	14	3	2	9	14	44	−30	11	Qualification for the Relegation round
6	Tartu JK Tammeka	14	3	2	9	9	40	−31	11	Qualification for the Relegation round
7	JK Tulevik ja Suure-Jaani Unitedi ÜN	14	3	2	9	19	52	−33	11	Qualification for the Relegation round
8	Tartu SK 10 Premium	14	3	0	11	10	64	−54	9	Qualification for the Relegation round

Rules for classification: 1) points; 2) goal difference; 3) number of goals scored

Championship round

Pos	Team	Pld	Pts
1	FC Flora (C)	20	56
2	Pärnu JK	20	46
3	JK Tallinna Kalev	20	29
4	Saku Sporting	20	22

(C) Champions
Relegation round

Pos	Team	Pld	Pts
5	Tartu JK Tammeka	20	22
6	JK Tulevik ja Suure-Jaani Unitedi ÜN	20	22
7	Põlva FC Lootos	20	20
8	Tartu SK 10 Premium (R)	20	10

(R) Relegated

==== Naiste Esiliiga ====
Pos	Team	Pld	W	D	L	GF	GA	GD	Pts	Promotion, qualification or relegation
1	Pärnu JK II (Note: Reserve teams are ineligible for promotion.)	14	10	2	2	56	7	+49	32	Qualification for the Promotion round
2	FC Flora II	14	8	4	2	48	11	+37	28	Qualification for the Promotion round
3	Tallinna JK Legion	14	6	3	5	28	49	−21	21	Qualification for the Promotion round
4	Tallinna FC Ajax	14	6	3	5	16	33	−17	21	Qualification for the Promotion round
5	JK Tallinna Kalev II	14	6	1	7	28	28	0	19	Qualification for the Relegation round
6	Tartu JK Tammeka II	14	4	6	4	8	13	−5	18	Qualification for the Relegation round
7	Nõmme Kalju FC	14	1	6	7	9	25	−16	9	Qualification for the Relegation round
8	FC Elva	14	1	3	10	12	38	−26	6	Qualification for the Relegation round

Updated to match(es) played on 18 August 2019. Source:
Rules for classification: 1) points; 2) goal difference; 3) number of goals scored

==== Naiste Teine liiga ====
Pos	Team	Pld	W	D	L	GF	GA	GD	Pts	Promotion, qualification or relegation
1	FC Kuressaare	14	10	3	1	58	18	+40	33	Promotion to 2020 Naiste Esiliiga
2	Pärnu JK Vaprus	14	9	2	3	60	21	+39	29	Qualification to Promotion play-offs
3	JK Narva Trans	14	5	1	8	19	37	−18	16	
4	Paide Linnanaiskond	14	3	6	5	28	36	−8	15	
5	Põlva FC Lootos II	14	3	3	8	8	28	−20	12	
6	Kohtla-Järve JK Järve	14	3	3	8	9	42	−33	12	

Updated to match(es) played on 6 October 2019. Source:
Rules for classification: 1) points; 2) goal difference; 3) number of goals scored

==== Post-season games ====
To Naiste Esiliiga

Team 1	Agg.	Team 2	1st leg	2nd leg
Nõmme Kalju (Esiliiga 7th)	0–9	Pärnu Vaprus (II liiga 2nd)	0–2	0–7

=== Youth ===
Age group	League	Champions	Runners-up	Third place	Top goalscorer	Goals
Boys U19	Eliitliiga Esiliiga (9/16)	Nõmme United (34)	FCI Tallinn (29)	Narva Trans (29)	(Latvia) Dinārs Ekharts (Tabasalu) (Estonia) Aleksandr Jurõšev (Narva Trans)	16 (16 games); 16 (10 games)
Boys U17	Eliitliiga Esiliiga (8/17)	Nõmme United (46)	Tallinna Legion (43)	Tallinna Kalev (33)	(Estonia) Daniil Tarassenkov (Tallinna Legion)	29 (16 games)
Boys U17	Eliitliiga II liiga (12/22)	Tartu Tammeka (52)	Viljandi Tulevik (47)	Keila (45)	(Estonia) Marten Henrik Kelement (Keila)	30 (18 games)
Boys U17	Eliitliiga III liiga (11/20)	Pärnu Vaprus (53)	Tartu Kalev (52)	Sillamäe Kalev (34)	(Estonia) Mauris Villems (Tartu Kalev)	48 (17 games)
Boys U16	Esiliiga (10/18)	Tallinna Kalev (51)	Tartu Tammeka (40)	Tallinna Flora I (40)	(Estonia) Ramol Sillamaa (Tallinna Kalev)	23 (18 games)
Boys U16	II liiga (10/18)	Tabasalu (47)	Narva Trans (44)	Rakvere Tarvas (39)	(Estonia) Deniss Sokkojev (Narva Trans)	39 (17 games)
Boys U15	Esiliiga (10/18)	Harju Laagri (42)	Tabasalu (39)	Nõmme United (37)	(Estonia) Kristjan Kriis (Harju Laagri)	25 (17 games)
Boys U15	II liiga (10/18)	Viimsi MRJK (49)	Paide LM (39)	Tallinna Flora I (33)	(Estonia) Oliver Säälik (Viimsi MRJK)	29 (17 games)
Boys U15	III liiga (10/18)	Rakvere Tarvas (47)	Kuressaare (39)	Kose (38)	(Estonia) Marten Liukonen (Rakvere Tarvas) (Estonia) Karlos Tänav (Kuressaare)	24 (16 games); 24 (17 games)
Boys U15	IV liiga (7/12)	Võru Helios (33)	Tartu Tammeka II (31)	Kuusalu Kalev (23)	(Estonia) Karl Liping (Võru Helios)	14 (12 games)
Boys U14	Esiliiga (10/18)	Tallinna Levadia Roheline (43)	Tallinn (39)	Tallinna Flora I (36)	(Estonia) Alex Dunitš (FCI Tallinn)	25 (18 games)
Boys U14	II liiga A-tier (11/10)	Narva Trans (30)	Elva (23)	Loo (20)	(Estonia) Peeter Alev (Elva)	12 (10 games)
Boys U14	II liiga B-tier (10/9)	Jõhvi Phoenix (24)	Keila (18)	Tallinna Kalev (17)	(Estonia) Veniamin Bogatov (Jõhvi Phoenix)	17 (9 games)
Boys U14	II liiga C-tier (8/7)	Kohtla-Järve Zenit (18)	Tallinna Ararat (16)	Tallinna Flora II (15)	(Estonia) Artjom Maklagin (Kohtla-Järve Zenit)	15 (7 games)
Boys U13	A-tier group A1 (6/10)	Tallinna Flora I (25)	Pärnu Vaprus Kollane (25)	Tartu Merkuur-Juunior (21)	No goalscorers listed	
Boys U13	A-tier group A2	Rakvere Tarvas I	Tartu Tammeka Sinine	Tabasalu Sinine	No goalscorers listed	
Boys U13	A-tier group A3	Harju Laagri	Tallinn II	Viimsi MRJK I	No goalscorers listed	
Boys U13	A-tier group B1	Tallinna Levadia Roheline	Tallinn I	Tartu Tammeka Valge	No goalscorers listed	
Boys U13	A-tier group B2	Olymp	Tallinna Ajax	Tallinna Kalev Sinine	No goalscorers listed	
Boys U13	A-tier group B3	Tallinna Flora II	Pärnu Vaprus Must	Loo I	No goalscorers listed	
Boys U13	B-tier group 1	Tallinna Augur	Viimsi Kratid	Tallinna Levadia Valged	No goalscorers listed	
Boys U13	B-tier group 2	Paide LM Koeru	Viimsi MRJK II	Sillamäe	No goalscorers listed	
Boys U13	B-tier group 3	Vändra Vaprus	Pärnu	Keila	No goalscorers listed	
Boys U12	A-tier group 1	Viimsi MRJK I	Tallinna Levadia Must	Tallinna Kalev Valge	No goalscorers listed	
Boys U12	A-tier group 2	Nõmme United I	Nõmme Kalju I	Tartu Santos I	No goalscorers listed	
Boys U12	A-tier group 3	Narva Trans	Raasiku Joker	FCI Tallinn I	No goalscorers listed	
Boys U12	B-tier group 1	Nõmme United	FCI Tallinn III	Nõmme Kalju II	No goalscorers listed	
Boys U12	B-tier group 2	Viljandi Tulevik Kollane	Elva Valge	Põltsamaa Sport	No goalscorers listed	
Boys U12	B-tier group 3	Tallinn	Saue	Hiiumaa	No goalscorers listed	
Boys U12	B-tier group 4	Tallinna FC Flora Valged	Leisi JK	Suure-Jaani United	No goalscorers listed	
Girls U17	Esiliiga	Tabasalu	Tallinna Levadia	Tallinna Flora	No goalscorers listed	
Girls U15	Esiliiga	Kuressaare	Tabasalu	Rakvere Tarvas	No goalscorers listed	
Girls U13	Group A	Tallinna Ararat	Maardu LM	Tartu Helios	No goalscorers listed	
Girls U13	Group B	Kohila Püsivus	Tallinna Ajax	Tallinna Kalev	No goalscorers listed	
Girls U13	Group c	Tallinna Levadia	Tabasalu	Saku Sporting	No goalscorers listed	

- The brackets in the league category show how many teams and games were there in the league
- The brackets in the medalists category show how many points the respective team earned during the season.

== Cup competitions ==
=== Estonian Cup ===
Fourth Round
JK Tabasalu	6
FC Zenit Tallinn	1
Viimsi JK II	0
FC Elva	3
JK Narva Trans	8
Jõgeva SK Noorus-96	-
Maardu Linnameeskond	4
Läänemaa JK	0
Nõmme Kalju FC	3
JK Tallinna Kalev (a.e.t.)	0
FC Järva-Jaani	0
Tartu JK Tammeka	6
Paide Linnameeskond	2
Tallinna JK Legion	1
FCI Levadia Tallinn	2
Tallinna FC Flora	1

Quarterfinals
Tabasalu JK	1
FC Elva	5
Narva JK Trans	2
Maardu Linnameeskond	0
Nõmme Kalju FC	2
Tartu JK Tammeka (a.e.t.)	1
Paide Linnameeskond	1
FCI Levadia (a.e.t.)	4

Semifinals
JK Narva Trans	5
FC Elva	0
Nõmme Kalju FC	3
FCI Levadia (a.e.t.)	2

Final
JK Narva Trans	2
Nõmme Kalju FC (a.e.t.)	1

Home teams listed on top of bracket. (AET): At Extra Time

=== Small Cup ===
Fourth Round
4	Tartu FC Santos	1
5	Tallinna FC Zenit	3
5	Maarjamäe FC Igiliikur	0
5	Saue JK	2
4	Raasiku FC Joker	2
4	FC Flora U19	1
5	FC Otepää	3
RL	SC ReUnited	0
5	FC Sillamäe	1
4	Pärnu JK Poseidon	3
4	Paide Linnameeskond III	3
4	Lasnamäe FC Ajax	0
5	Türi Ganvix JK	3 (2)
5	Tarvastu & Tõrva ÜM	3 (4)
5	Lilleküla JK Retro	3
5	Tartu JK Welco X	0

Quarterfinals
5	Tallinna FC Zenit	2
5	Saue JK	1
4	Raasiku FC Joker	3 (4)
5	FC Otepää	3 (5)
4	Pärnu JK Poseidon	0
4	Paide Linnameeskond III	3
5	Tarvastu & Tõrva ÜM	1
5	Lilleküla JK Retro	4

Semifinals
5	Tallinna FC Zenit	1
5	FC Otepää	3
4	Paide Linnameeskond III	4
5	Lilleküla JK Retro	0

Final
5	FC Otepää	1
4	Paide Linnameeskond III	4

Home teams listed on top of bracket. (AET): At Extra Time

=== Super Cup ===
3 March 2019 Final	Nõmme Kalju FC	3–2	Tallinna FCI Levadia	Tallinn
13:00	Ugge 53' (pen.); Tamm 62'; Markovych 70'	Report	Zhurakhovskyi 39'; Nesterov 77'	Stadium: Sportland Arena; Attendance: 641; Referee: Grigori Ošomkov

=== Estonian Women's Cup ===
First round
2	FC Elva	2
2	Saku Sporting (a.e.t.)	3
1	Tallinna FC Ajax	4
3	Tallinna JK Legion	1
1	Tartu JK Tammeka	1
1	JK Tallinna Kalev	2
RL	Pärnu JK Vaprus	0
1	Põlva FC Lootos	3

Quarterfinals
1	Tartu SK 10 Premium	1
1	JK Tallinna Kalev	5
2	Tallinna FC Ajax	-
1	Pärnu JK	+
1	Põlva FC Lootos	0
1	FC Flora	10
1	Saku Sporting	+
-	Tallinna FC Levadia	-

Semifinals
1	Pärnu JK	3
1	JK Tallinna Kalev	1
1	Saku Sporting	0
1	FC Flora	4

Finals
1	Pärnu JK	0
1	FC Flora	4

Home teams listed on top of bracket. (AET): At Extra Time

=== Women's Super Cup ===
23 February 2019 Final	FC Flora	2–1	Pärnu JK	Tallinn
14:00	Tullus 45'; Loo 89' (pen.)	Report	Shcherbachenia 48'	Stadium: Sportland Arena; Attendance: 247; Referee: Dmitri Kirilov

== European competitions ==
Nõmme Kalju FC

9 July 2019 Champions League Q1	Nõmme Kalju (Estonia)	0–1	(North Macedonia) Shkëndija	Kadriorg Stadium, Tallinn (Note: Nõmme Kalju play their home match at Kadriorg Stadium, Tallinn, instead of their regular stadium Hiiu Stadium, Tallinn which does not meet UEFA requirements.)
18:00 (19:00 EEST)		Report	Ibraimi 81' (pen.)	Attendance: 1,640; Referee: Donald Robertson (Scotland)

16 July 2019 Champions League Q1	Shkëndija (North Macedonia)	1–2	(Estonia) Nõmme Kalju	Toše Proeski Arena, Skopje (Note: Shkëndija play their home matches at Toše Proeski Arena, Skopje, instead of their regular stadium Ecolog Arena, Tetovo, due to renovation.)
17:00	Ibraimi 62' (pen.)	Report	Uggè 6'; Liliu 90+1'	Attendance: 2,546; Referee: Alain Bieri (Switzerland)

24 July 2019 Champions League Q2	Celtic (Scotland)	5–0	(Estonia) Nõmme Kalju	Celtic Park, Glasgow
20:45 (19:45 BST)	Ajer 36'; Christie 44' (pen.), 65'; Griffiths 45+3'; McGregor 77'	Report		Attendance: 41,872; Referee: Jakob Kehlet (Denmark)

30 July 2019 Champions League Q2	Nõmme Kalju (Estonia)	0–2	(Scotland) Celtic	A. Le Coq Arena, Tallinn (Note: Nõmme Kalju played their home match at A. Le Coq Arena, Tallinn, instead of their regular stadium Hiiu Stadium, Tallinn which did not meet UEFA requirements.)
19:00 (20:00 EEST)		Report	Kulinitš 10' (o.g.); Shved 90+3'	Attendance: 4,014; Referee: Benoît Millot (France)

8 August 2019 Europa League Q3	F91 Dudelange (Luxembourg)	3–1	(Estonia) Nõmme Kalju	Stade Josy Barthel, Luxembourg City
20:00	Stolz 28', 30', 75'	Report	Puri 41'	Attendance: 1,239; Referee: Fábio Veríssimo (Portugal)

13 August 2019 Europa League Q3	Nõmme Kalju (Estonia)	0–1	(Luxembourg) F91 Dudelange	A. Le Coq Arena, Tallinn
18:00 (19:00 EEST)		Report	Sinani 56'	Attendance: 1,202; Referee: Sergey Lapochkin (Russia)

FC Flora

11 July 2019 Europa League Q1	Flora (Estonia)	2–0	(Serbia) Radnički Niš	A. Le Coq Arena, Tallinn
18:00 (19:00 EEST)	Lepik 75'; Vassiljev 89'	Report		Attendance: 1,250; Referee: Alexandru Tean (Moldova)

18 July 2019 Europa League Q1	Radnički Niš (Serbia)	2–2	(Estonia) Flora	Čair Stadium, Niš
20:45	Mihajlović 68'; Čumić 84'	Report	Pürg 80'; Lepik 90+3'	Attendance: 4,329; Referee: Zbyněk Proske (Czech Republic)

25 July 2019 Europa League Q2	Flora (Estonia)	1–2	(Germany) Eintracht Frankfurt	A. Le Coq Arena, Tallinn
19:00 (20:00 EEST)	Ainsalu 34'	Report	Torró 24'; Joveljić 71'	Attendance: 8,500; Referee: Ali Palabıyık (Turkey)

1 August 2019 Europa League Q2	Eintracht Frankfurt (Germany)	2–1	(Estonia) Flora	Waldstadion, Frankfurt
20:30	Paciência 37', 54' (pen.)	Report	Sinyavskiy 40'	Attendance: 48,000; Referee: Jørgen Daugbjerg Burchardt (Denmark)

FCI Levadia

11 July 2019 Europa League Q1	Stjarnan (Iceland)	2–1	(Estonia) FCI Levadia	Stjörnuvöllur, Garðabær
22:00 (20:00 WET)	Ragnarsson 15', 74'	Report	Andreyev 79'	Attendance: 876; Referee: Denis Scherbakov (Belarus)

18 July 2019 Europa League Q1	FCI Levadia (Estonia)	3–2 (a.e.t.)	(Iceland) Stjarnan	A. Le Coq Arena, Tallinn
18:00 (EEST)	Osipov 17', 89'; Kruglov 105' (pen.)		Ragnarsson 25'; Guðjónsson 120+2'	Attendance: 1,446; Referee: Besfort Kasumi (Kosovo)

JK Narva Trans

11 July 2019 Europa League Q1	Narva Trans (Estonia)	0–2	(Montenegro) Budućnost Podgorica	Rakvere Linnastaadion, Rakvere (Note: Narva Trans played their home match at Rakvere Linnastaadion, Rakvere, instead of their regular stadium Narva Kreenholmi Stadium, Narva.)
17:30 (18:30 EEST)		Report	Ivanović 12'; Mijić 88'	Attendance: 319; Referee: Sergey Tsinkevich (Belarus)

18 July 2019 Europa League Q1	Budućnost Podgorica (Montenegro)	4–1	(Estonia) Narva Trans	Podgorica City Stadium, Podgorica
20:45	Vučić 2'; Bakić 49'; Perović 56'; Zarubica 78'	Report	Golovljov 39'	Attendance: 1,700; Referee: Stefan Apostolov (Bulgaria)

== Indoor football ==
=== League season ===
Betsafe Saaliliiga

Pos	Team	Pld	W	D	L	GF	GA	GD	Pts	Promotion, qualification or relegation
1	Tallinna Cosmos	14	12	0	2	119	43	+76	36	Championship play-off semifinal
2	Tallinna Augur Enemat	14	11	0	3	101	51	+50	33	Championship play-off semifinal
3	Viimsi Smsraha	14	10	2	2	87	35	+52	32	Championship play-off quarterfinal
4	Narva United	14	6	1	7	65	46	+19	19	Championship play-off quarterfinal
5	Tartu Ravens Futsal EMÜ	14	5	2	7	71	65	+6	17	Championship play-off quarterfinal
6	Sillamäe NPM Silmet	14	5	0	9	49	106	−57	15	Championship play-off quarterfinal
7	Narva Ganza	14	3	1	10	50	119	−69	10	Relegation play-offs
8	Tartu Maksimum	14	1	0	13	39	116	−77	3	Relegation

Saalijalgpalli Esiliiga

Pos	Team	Pld	W	D	L	GF	GA	GD	Pts	Promotion, qualification or relegation
1	Tallinna Cosmos II	14	12	1	1	110	64	+46	37	
2	Sillamäe Dina	14	9	1	4	81	54	+27	28	Promotion
3	Narva United II	14	6	4	4	66	70	−4	22	
4	Kohila	14	6	1	7	95	80	+15	19	Promotion play-offs
5	Rummu Dünamo	14	5	2	7	98	87	+11	17	
6	Jõgeva Wolves	14	5	1	8	98	100	−2	16	
7	Tallinna Maccabi	14	4	2	8	80	86	−6	14	Relegation play-offs
8	Sillamäe	14	3	0	11	53	140	−87	9	Relegation

Saalijalgpalli Teine liiga

Pos	Team	Pld	W	D	L	GF	GA	GD	Pts	Promotion, qualification or relegation
1	Jõgeva Noorus-96	14	12	0	2	122	62	+60	36	Promotion
2	Kadrina	14	11	0	3	161	115	+46	33	Promotion play-offs
3	Rõuge Saunamaa	14	10	0	4	158	117	+41	30	
4	Põhja-Sakala	14	8	0	6	125	116	+9	24	
5	Padise Rummu Dünamo II	14	6	0	8	115	103	+12	18	
6	Narva United U19	14	6	0	8	78	113	−35	18	
7	Äksi Wolves	14	2	0	12	89	158	−69	6	
8	Sillamäe Kalev Alexela	14	1	0	13	74	138	−64	3	

Naiste Saalijalgpalli Meistriliiga

Pos	Team	Pld	W	D	L	GF	GA	GD	Pts	Promotion, qualification or relegation
1	Pae United	12	11	0	1	166	11	+155	33	Champions
2	Põltsamaa Motiiv	12	7	1	4	68	34	+34	22	
3	Nõmme Kalju	12	6	2	4	39	29	+10	20	
4	RaDina	12	2	2	8	19	83	−64	8	
5	Kuusalu Kalev	12	1	1	10	12	147	−135	4	

=== Play-offs ===
League winner
Play-offs are played to two wins.

Team 1	Series	Team 2	Game 1	Game 2	Game 3
Viimsi FC Smsraha (3rd)	2:1	Sillamäe FC NPM Silmet (6th)	11 : 2	2 : 3	8 : 4
Narva United FC (4th)	0:2	Tartu Ravens Futsal EMÜ SK (5th)	2 : 4	2 : 4	

Team 1	Agg.	Team 2	1st leg	2nd leg
Tallinna FC Cosmos (1st)	2:0	Tartu Ravens Futsal EMÜ SK (5th)	6 : 2	3 : 2
Tallinna SK Augur Enemat (2nd)	0:2	Viimsi FC Smsraha (3rd)	1 : 3	3 : 4 (a.e.t.)

Final is played to three wins.

Team 1	Series	Team 2	Game 1	Game 2	Game 3	Game 4
Tallinna FC Cosmos (1st)	1:3	Viimsi FC Smsraha (3rd)	4 : 1	0 : 3	0 : 8	1 : 4

Promotion to Betsafe Saaliliiga
Play-offs are played to two wins.

Team 1	Agg.	Team 2	1st leg	2nd leg
Narva SK Ganza (B. Saaliliiga 7th)	0:2	JK Kohila (Esiliiga 4th)	5 : 6	3 : 11

Promotion to Saali Esiliiga
Play-offs contain two games.

Team 1	Agg.	Team 2	1st leg	2nd leg
SK Kadrina (Teine liiga 2nd)	11:8	Tallinna Maccabi (Esiliiga 7th)	3 : 4	8 : 4

=== Cup ===
Fourth Round
3	Rõuge Saunamaa	13
2	Maccabi	9
1	Tallinna Cosmos	8
2	Kohila	3
3	Kadrina	3
1	Narva Ganza	10
2	Sillamäe Dina	9
3	Äksi Wolves	6
2	Rummu Dünamo	7
1	Tartu Maksimum	2
2	Sillamäe	3
1	Viimsi Smsraha	13
1	Tallinna Augur Enemat	9
1	Tartu Ravens Futsal EMÜ	3
2	Narva United II	8
SRL	Püssi	4

Quarterfinals
3	Rõuge Saunamaa	17
1	Tallinna Cosmos	11
1	Narva Ganza	4
2	Sillamäe Dina	7
2	Rummu Dünamo	3
1	Viimsi Smsraha	14
1	Tallinna Augur Enemat	4
2	Narva United II	2

Semifinals
3	Rõuge Saunamaa	11
2	Sillamäe Dina	4
1	Viimsi Smsraha	5
1	Tallinna Augur Enemat	1

Final
3	Rõuge Saunamaa	4
1	Viimsi Smsraha	7

Home teams listed on top of bracket. (AET): At Extra Time

=== Super Cup ===
20 October 2018 Final	Tallinna FC Cosmos	4–6	Viimsi FC Smsraha	Tallinn
18:00	Pavel Rubel 1'; Nikita Tšernei 6', 40'; Aleksei Titenok 20' (og.)	Report	Ervin Stüf 8', 15'; Jevgeni Merkurjev 14', 35'; Sergei Kostin 19'; Aleksei Titenok 37'	Stadium: Kalevi Spordihall; Attendance: 177; Referee: Jagnar Jakobson, Rando Kesküla

== Beach football ==
=== Rannajalgpalli Meistriliiga ===
Pos	Team	Pld	W	W+	WP	L	GF	GA	GD	Pts	Qualification
1	BSC Thunder Häcker	12	7	1	0	4	53	28	+25	23	Championship playoffs
2	Nõmme BSC OlyBet	12	6	2	0	4	47	39	+8	22	Championship playoffs
3	SK Augur Enemat	12	5	0	2	5	49	44	+5	17	Championship playoffs
4	BSC Üksjalgvärav Elementmaster	12	4	0	0	8	39	62	−23	12	Championship playoffs
5	Saue JK	12	3	0	0	9	39	54	−15	9	Relegation playoffs

Updated to match(es) played on 10 August. Source: jalgpall.ee

Semi-finals
BSC Thunder Häcker	4
BSC Üksjalgvärav Elementmaster	2
Nõmme BSC Olybet	3
SK Augur Enemat	7

Final
BSC Thunder Häcker	2
SK Augur Enemat	0
Third-place play-off
Nõmme BSC Olybet	4
BSC Üksjalgvärav Elementmaster	5

=== Rannajalgpalli Esiliiga ===
Club	15.06	29.06	20.07	27.07	17.08	Ranking pts	W	W+	Wp	L	Table pts	All pts	Notes
FC Chromtex	1	1	5	1	1	45	10	0	3	2	33	78	Possibility of gaining promotion to 2020 Beach Soccer Meistriliiga
BSC Türi	3	1	3	2	5	37	10	0	0	5	30	67	
Optibet All-Stars	2	2	4	6	3	33	10	1	0	4	32	65	
Santeh	7	3	2	5	4	29	6	1	0	8	20	49	
Schöttli Keskkonnatehnika	4	7	6	3	6	23	4	1	0	7	14	40	
Ärilaen	8	6	8	4	2	22	3	2	1	9	14	36	
BSC IGI Optibet	5	4	7	7	8	16	2	1	1	8	9	31	
JK Fellin	6	8	6	8	7	16	1	0	1	13	4	20	

== Winter tournaments ==
=== Year-ending tournament ===
Age	League	Champions	Runners-up	Third place	Best player	Best goalkeeper	Top goalscorer	Source
Boys U17	Eliitliiga Esiliiga	FC Nõmme United	Tallinna JK Legion	Tallinna FC Levadia	Nikita Ivanonv (Legion)	Dennis Jeremejev (Legion)	Marten Henrik Kelement (Keila)	
Boys U17	Eliitliiga II	Võru FC Helios	FC Elva	Läänemaa / Hiiumaa	Andreas Kiivit (Elva)	Joonas Jõeveer (Helios)	Marcus Lepistik (Helios)	
Girls U17		JK Tabasalu	Tallinna FC Flora	Tallinna FC Levadia	Sandra Pärn (Tabasalu)	Victoria Maria Laht (Flora)	Simona Põlismäe (Flora)	
Boys U16		Tartu JK Tammeka I	Tallinna FC Flora I	Tallinna FC Flora II	Not awarded			

== County Competition ==
=== 2019 Fixtures ===
21 June 2019	Harjumaa	0–2	Jõgevamaa	Keila
19.00		Report	12' Lauri Robert Indus (Jõgeva Noorus-96); 80' Vallo Goroško (clubless)	Stadium: Keila jalgpallistaadioni muruväljak Attendance: 36; Referee: Tanel Üprus

6 July 2019	Tallinn	5–4	Ida-Virumaa	Tallinn
13.00	(Lilleküla Retro) Hans-Kristjan Aasma 6'; (Lilleküla Retro) Vahur Kiis 24', 48', 54', 64'	Report	16' Maksim Aleksejev (Tallinn); 33' Vladislav Ivanov (Narva Trans II); 73', 82' (pen.) Vassili Kulik (Sillamäe Kalev)	Stadium: TNTK stadium Attendance: 16; Referee: Roman Daniljuk

7 July 2019	Valgamaa	5–1	Hiiumaa	Valga
17.00	(Valga Warrior) Sander Rõivassepp 21', 45'; (Valga Warrior) Mark Ivanov 60'; (Valga Warrior) Marek Naal 77'; (Valga Warrior) Inno Tuhkanen 83'	Report	52' Ken Pähn (Hiiumaa)	Stadium: Valga linnastaadion Attendance: 56; Referee: Kristjan Kattus

27 July 2019	Läänemaa	10–2	Põlvamaa	Haapsalu
14.00	(Läänemaa) Martin Salf 12', 15', 17', 45+3'; (Läänemaa) Karmo Einmann 28', 58', 82', 89'; (Läänemaa) Rivo Reinsalu 52'; (Läänemaa) Marten Valk 90'	Report	19', 51' Alar Alve (Värska Originaal)	Stadium: Haapsalu linnastaadion Attendance: 48; Referee: Lauri Salei

4 August 2019	Raplamaa	2–1	Viljandimaa	Rapla
17.00	(Flora) Joonas Soomre 34'; (Raplamaa) Jürgen Andessalu 89'	(Report)	83' Janek Meet (SaareMaa aaMeraaS)	Stadium: Rapla Kesklinnakooli staadion Attendance: 80; Referee: Denis Petrov

10 August 2019	Pärnumaa	3–4	Saaremaa	Pärnu
18:00	(Pärnu Vaprus) Toomas Pent 31', 68'; (clubless) Oleg Mjasojedov 47'	Report	5' Urmas Rajaver (Kose); 37' (o.g.) Henri Rüütli (Pärnu); 70', 90' Kristen Mere (Kuressaare)	Stadium: Pärnu Rannastaadion; Attendance: 178; Referee: Eiko Saar

18 August 2019	Võrumaa	5–2	Järvamaa	Võru
15:00	(Võru Helios) Sten Org 19', 81'; (Vastseliina) Erki Alliksoo 65', 77', 80'	Report	41' (pen.) Arto Saar (Järva-Jaani); 56' Alar Arula (EMÜ)	Stadium: Võru linnastaadion Attendance: 45; Referee: Elar Tarkus

8 September 2019	Lääne-Virumaa	2–12	Tartumaa	Rakvere
13.00				Stadium: Rakvere linnastaadion
