= Langgaard =

Langgaard is a surname of Danish origin. Notable people with this surname include:

- Jacoba Langgaard, Faroese football player
- Johannes Peter Langgaard, Danish mechanician, bricklayer and businessman, father of Siegfried
- Rued Langgaard, Danish composer and organist
- Siegfried Langgaard, Danish pianist and composer, father of Rued

== See also ==
- Lynggaard
