= Anastasia Shcherbachenia =

Belarusian footballer

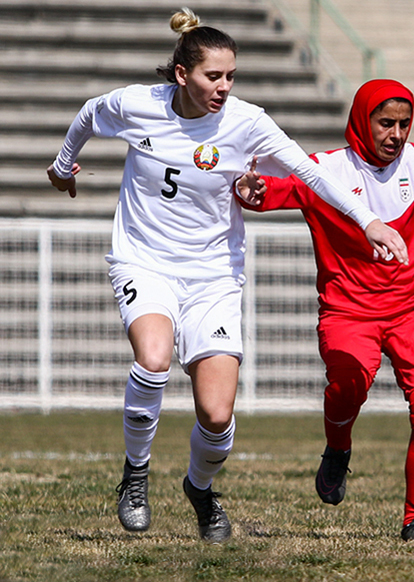

Personal information
- Date of birth: 9 January 1990 (age 36)
- Place of birth: Belarus
- Position: Midfielder

Senior career*
Years	Team	Apps	(Gls)
2010–2011	Zorka-BDU	16	(7)
2012–2014	FC Minsk	42	(9)
2014	Nadezhda	15	(12)
2015	Neman	9	(1)
2015	Bobruichanka	8	(5)
2016–2019	Pärnu JK		
2019–2021	Pärnu Vaprus		

International career
2012–2020	Belarus	22	(7)

Managerial career
- 2022–: Pärnu Vaprus
- * Club domestic league appearances and goals

Anastasia Shcherbachenia (born 9 January 1990) is a Belarusian football manager and former player who played as a midfielder and has appeared for the Belarus women's national team.

== Career ==
Shcherbachenia has been capped for the Belarus national team, appearing for the team during the 2019 FIFA Women's World Cup qualifying cycle.

== International goals ==
No.	Date	Venue	Opponent	Score	Result	Competition
1.	15 September 2016	FC Minsk Stadium, Minsk, Belarus	Macedonia	2–0	6–2	UEFA Women's Euro 2017 qualifying
2.	15 September 2017	Stadion Górnika Łęczna, Łęczna, Poland	Poland	1–3	1–4	2019 FIFA Women's World Cup qualification
3.	3 September 2019	Borisov Arena, Barysaw, Belarus	Faroe Islands	2–0	6–0	UEFA Women's Euro 2022 qualifying
4.	3 September 2019	Borisov Arena, Barysaw, Belarus	Faroe Islands	3–0	6–0	UEFA Women's Euro 2022 qualifying
5.	4 October 2019	Borisov Arena, Barysaw, Belarus	Norway	1–0	1–7	UEFA Women's Euro 2022 qualifying
6.	27 November 2020	Seaview, Belfast, Northern Ireland	Northern Ireland	1–1	2–3	UEFA Women's Euro 2022 qualifying
7.	27 November 2020	Seaview, Belfast, Northern Ireland	Northern Ireland	2–2	2–3	UEFA Women's Euro 2022 qualifying
