= Mona Breckmann =

Faroese footballer (born 1991)

Personal information
- Date of birth: 6 September 1991 (age 35)
- Position: Forward

Senior career*
Years	Team	Apps	(Gls)
2010–2012	AB	26	(27)

International career^{‡}
2008–2009	Faroe Islands U19	6	(0)
2011	Faroe Islands	3	(0)
- * Club domestic league appearances and goals ‡ National team caps and goals as of 8 March 2011

Mona Breckmann (born 6 September 1991) is a Faroese former footballer who played as a forward. She has been a member of the Faroe Islands women's national team.
