= Anna Sofía Sevdal =

Faroese footballer (born 1993)

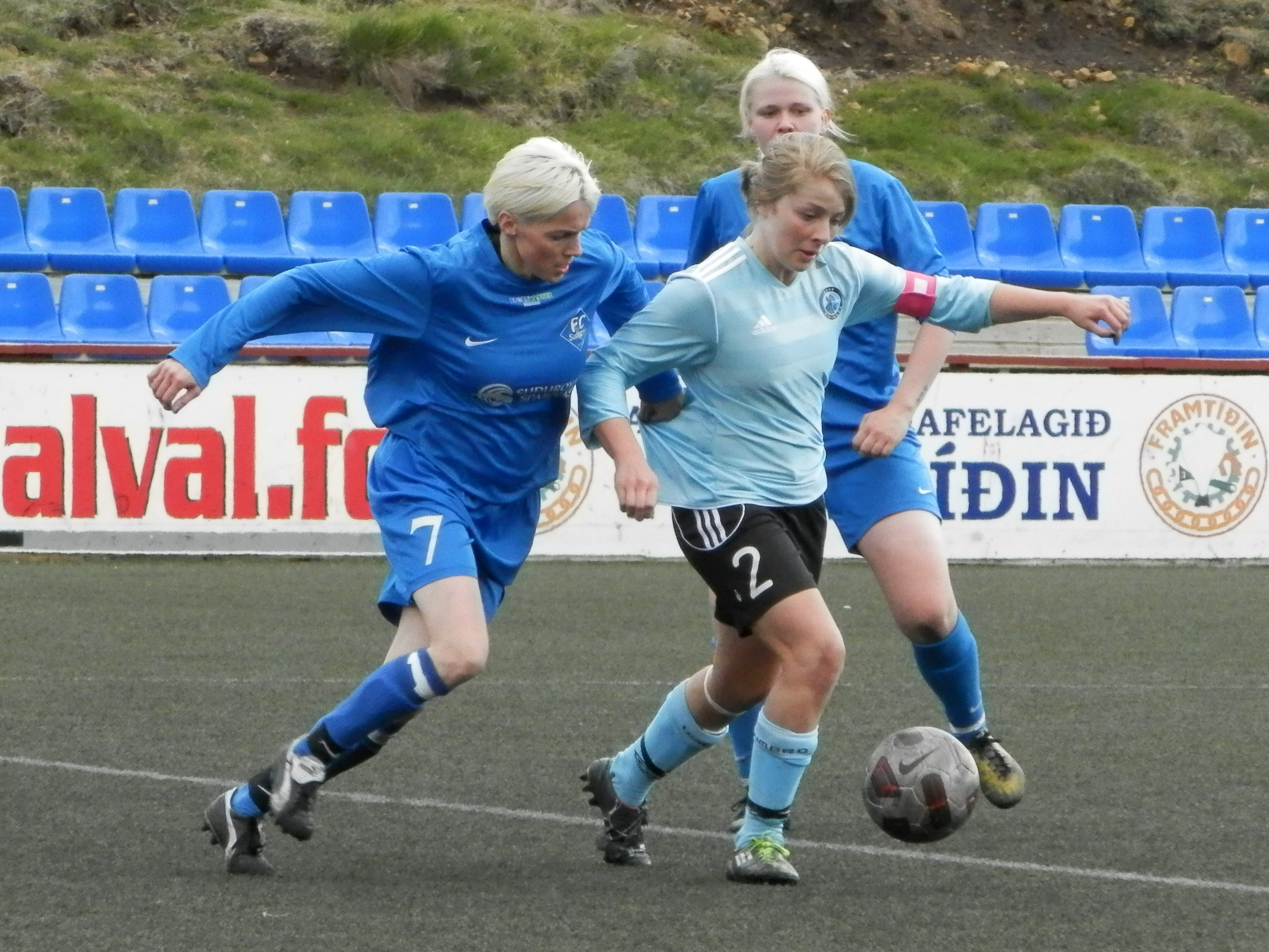
- FC Suðuroy vs Víkingur Gøta women in 2012

Personal information
- Full name: Anna Sofía Sevdal Jakobsen
- Date of birth: December 20, 1993 (age 32)
- Position: Midfielder

Team information
- Current team: EB/Streymur/Skála

Senior career*
| Years | Team | Apps | (Gls) |
| 2010–2012 | Vikingur | 53 | (7) |
| 2013– | EB/Streymur/Skála | 115 | (60) |

International career^{‡}
| 2010–2011 | Faroe Islands U19 | 6 | (1) |
| 2010– | Faroe Islands | 19 | (1) |
- * Club domestic league appearances and goals as of 18 July 2019 ‡ National team caps and goals as of 18 July 2019

Anna Sofía Sevdal Jakobsen (born 20 December 1993), known as Ansy Sevdal, is a Faroese football midfielder who currently plays for EB/Streymur/Skála and the Faroe Islands women's national football team.

== Personal life ==
She is the younger sister of fellow Faroese international Heidi Sevdal.

== Honours ==
EB/Streymur/Skála

- 1. deild kvinnur: 2017, 2018
- Steypakappingin kvinnur: 2017, 2018
