= Anna Brændstrup =

Faroese footballer (born 2005)

Personal information
- Full name: Anna Carolina Brændstrup
- Date of birth: 23 July 2005 (age 21)
- Place of birth: Denmark
- Height: 1.68 m (5 ft 6 in)
- Position: Attacking midfielder

Team information
- Current team: OB Q
- Number: 9

Youth career
- Taastrup FC
- Brøndby
- Nordsjælland

Senior career*
| Years | Team | Apps | (Gls) |
| 2023–2025 | HB Køge | 7 | (2) |
| 2025–2026 | Gil Vicente | 15 | (6) |
| 2026– | OB Q | | |

International career^{‡}
| –2024 | Faroe Islands U19 | 7 | (5) |
| 2024– | Faroe Islands | 14 | (3) |
- * Club domestic league appearances and goals as of 8 November 2025 ‡ National team caps and goals as of 08:45, 24 October 2026 (UTC)

Anna Carolina Brændstrup (born 23 July 2005) is a footballer who plays as a midfielder for A-Liga club OB Q. Born in Denmark, she plays for the Faroe Islands national team. She previously played for Gil Vicente and HB Køge.

== Youth career ==
Brændstrup started playing football with Taastrup FC, later joining Brøndby IF and FC Nordsjælland in succession. She signed a youth player contract with HB Køge in 2021, turning out for their under-18 squad and later debuting for the first team in 2023.

== Club career ==
Brændstrup started her senior career with A-Liga side HB Køge, making her debut for the first team on 13 September 2023 in the Danish Cup. Brændstrup made seven league appearances and scored two goals. Following her stint there, she signed for Portuguese side Gil Vicente during the summer of 2025.

== International career ==
Brændstrup is a Faroe Islands international. In 2025, she played for the Faroe Islands women's national football team for the 2025 UEFA Women's Nations League.

== Style of play ==
Brændstrup plays as a midfielder. Danish news website wrote in 2021 that she "is an offensive player with technical skills. She is described as a dedicated and goal-oriented player who is hardworking".

== International goals ==
| No. | Date | Venue | Opponent | Score | Result | Competition |
|---|---|---|---|---|---|---|
| 1. | 2 March 2026 | Dasaki Stadium, Dasaki Achnas, Cyprus | Cyprus | 1–1 | 1–1 | Friendly |
| 2. | 18 April 2026 | Tórsvøllur, Tórshavn, Faroe Islands | Georgia | 1–0 | 1–0 | 2027 FIFA Women's World Cup qualification |
| 3. | 9 October 2026 | Estadi Nacional, Andorra la Vella, Andorra | Andorra | 2–0 | 5–0 | Friendly |

== Private life ==
Brændstrup was born on 23 July 2005 in Denmark, to a Faroese mother and a Danish father. She is the granddaughter of Danish footballer Bent Erik Nielsen.
