= Birita Ryan =

Faroese footballer

Personal information
- Date of birth: 24 November 2002 (age 23)
- Position: Defender

Team information
- Current team: KÍ
- Number: 3

Senior career*
Years	Team	Apps	(Gls)
2018–	KÍ	98	(7)

International career^{‡}
2017–2018	Faroe Islands U17	5	(0)
2019	Faroe Islands U19	3	(0)
2020–	Faroe Islands	50	(3)
- * Club domestic league appearances and goals as of 21 September 2023. ‡ National team caps and goals as of 12 October 2026.

Birita Ryan (born 24 November 2002) is a Faroese footballer who plays as a defender for 1. deild kvinnur club Klaksvíkar Ítróttarfelag and the Faroe Islands women's national team.

== Club career ==
Ryan has played for KÍ in the Faroe Islands at the UEFA Women's Champions League.

== International career ==
Ryan capped for the Faroe Islands at senior level during the UEFA Women's Euro 2022 qualifying.

== International goals ==
No.	Date	Venue	Opponent	Score	Result	Competition
1.	31 May 2024	Tórsvøllur, Tórshavn, Faroe Islands	Andorra	3–0	4–0	UEFA Women's Euro 2025 qualifying
2.	24 October 2024	LNK Sporta Parks, Riga, Latvia	Latvia	1–1	1–2	2024 Women's Baltic Cup
3.	14 April 2026	Tórsvøllur, Tórshavn, Faroe Islands	Greece	2–3	2–3	2027 FIFA Women's World Cup qualification
