= Lynggaard =

Lynggaard is a surname of Danish origin. Notable people with the surname include:

- Alexander Lynggaard (1990– ), a Danish handballer
- Finn Lynggaard (1930–2011), a Danish artist
- Ole Lynggaard (1936– ), goldsmith and fine jewellery designer. Founded Ole Lynggaard Copenhagen.
- Lucas Lynggaard Tønnesen (2000-), a Danish actor known from the series The Rain (2018) or 1899 (2022) on Netflix

== See also ==
- Langgaard
