= Jensa Kannuberg Tórolvsdóttir =

Faroese football player

Jensa Tórolvsdóttir
Personal information
- Full name: Jensa Kannuberg Tórolvsdóttir
- Date of birth: August 3, 2001 (age 25)
- Place of birth: Syðrugøta, Faroe Islands
- Position: Midfielder

Team information
- Current team: Víkingur Gøta
- Number: 3

Senior career*
Years	Team	Apps	(Gls)
2016–2018	ÍF/Víkingur	39	(15)
2019–2020	ÍVB	36	(11)
2021–2022	Víkingur Gøta	31	(27)
2023	Thy-Thisted		

International career^{‡}
2017-2018	Faroe Islands U-17	12	(3)
2019-2020	Faroe Islands U-19	10	(1)
2020-	Faroe Islands	46	(6)
- * Club domestic league appearances and goals ‡ National team caps and goals as of 12 October 2026

Jensa K. Tórolvsdóttir (born 3 August 2001) is a Faroese football midfielder who currently plays for Víkingur Gøta. Since 2020, she has represented the Faroe Islands women's national football team at senior international level.

== Club career ==
In December 2021 Tórolvsdóttir was chosen the midfielder of the year and also entered in the team of the year in Faroese football after scoring 17 goals and assisting 15, the best result in the Betri Deildin 2021.) for Víkingur Gøta.

== International career ==
Tórolvsdóttir's first appearances for the senior Faroe Islands came in September 2020, at the UEFA Women's Euro 2022 qualifying round against Northern Ireland women's national football team. And in the away game, she scored her first goal for the national team

== International goals ==
No.	Date	Venue	Opponent	Score	Result	Competition
1.	1 December 2020	Seaview, Belfast, Northern Ireland	Northern Ireland	1–0	1–5	UEFA Women's Euro 2022 qualifying
2.	5 April 2023	Stade Achille Hammerel, Luxembourg City, Luxembourg	Luxembourg	4–2	5–5	Friendly
3.	12 July 2024	Tórsvøllur, Tórshavn, Faroe Islands	Montenegro	2–1	2–1	UEFA Women's Euro 2025 qualifying
4.	16 July 2024	Estadi Nacional, Andorra la Vella, Andorra	Andorra	1–0	4–0	UEFA Women's Euro 2025 qualifying
5.	8 April 2025	Tórsvøllur, Tórshavn, Faroe Islands	Gibraltar	2–0	5–0	2025 UEFA Women's Nations League
6.	9 October 2926	Estadi Nacional, Andorra la Vella, Andorra	Andorra	1–0	5–0	Friendly
