= Jacoba Langgaard =

Faroese footballer (born 1988)

Personal information
- Date of birth: 24 September 1988 (age 38)
- Position: Midfielder

Senior career*
Years	Team	Apps	(Gls)
2005–2007	GÍ	62	(15)
2008–2011	Víkingur	23	(9)
2013	ÍF	2	(0)
2015–2020	ÍF/Víkingur	31	(4)
2018–2020	ÍF/Víkingur/B68	39	(16)
2021–	B36 Tórshavn	17	(10)

International career^{‡}
2004–2005	Faroe Islands U19	6	(0)
2005–	Faroe Islands	20	(3)
- * Club domestic league appearances and goals as of 17 December 2022 ‡ National team caps and goals as of 17 December 2022

Jacoba Langgaard (born 24 September 1988) is a Faroese football who plays as a midfielder for B36 Tórshavn and the Faroe Islands women's national football team. In 2020, she was named the Faroese National Team Player of the Year.

In 2021, she signed with B36.
