= Kristiina Tullus =

Estonian footballer

Personal information
- Date of birth: 12 September 1998 (age 28)
- Place of birth: Tallinn, Estonia
- Position: Defender

Team information
- Current team: Flora
- Number: 28

Senior career*
Years	Team	Apps	(Gls)
2016-	Flora		

International career^{‡}
2015–2016	Estonia U-19	16	(0)
2019–	Estonia	20	(0)
- * Club domestic league appearances and goals ‡ National team caps and goals as of 19 April 2026

Kristiina Tullus (born 12 September 1998) is an Estonian footballer who plays as a defender for Flora and the Estonia women's national team.

== Career ==
She made her debut for the Estonia national team on 18 June 2019 against Belarus, starting the match.
