= Pärnu JK Vaprus (women) =

Estonian football club

- Full name: Pärnu Jalgpalliklubi Vaprus
- Ground: Pärnu Rannastaadion, Pärnu
- Capacity: 1,501
- Chairman: Karl Palatu
- Manager: Anastasija-Grazyna Shcherbachenia
- League: Naiste Meistriliiga
- 2022: 6th
- Website: http://vaprus.ee

Pärnu JK Vaprus ladies' team is an Estonian women's association football club in Pärnu. The club currently plays in Naiste Meistriliiga, the first level in the Estonian women's football system.

For the 2023 season they joined forces with Viljandi JK Tulevik, creating Pärnu JK Vaprus/Viljandi JK Tulevik United.
