= Natalia Voskobovich =

Belarusian footballer

Personal information
- Date of birth: 25 October 1993 (age 33)
- Place of birth: Minsk, Belarus,
- Position: Goalkeeper

Team information
- Current team: Zenit

Senior career*
Years	Team	Apps	(Gls)
2010–2017	Zorka-BDU	122	(9)
2018–2020	FC Minsk	32	(0)
2021	Zvezda Perm	13	(0)
2022-	Zenit	2	(0)

International career^{‡}
2010-2011	Belarus U19	5	(0)
2016-	Belarus	18	(0)
- * Club domestic league appearances and goals as of 20:30, 13 August 2022 (UTC) ‡ National team caps and goals as of 10:55, 30 August 2019 (UTC)

Natalia Voskobovich (born 25 October 1993) is a Belarusian footballer who plays as a goalkeeper in the Top Division for Zenit and has appeared for the Belarus women's national team.

== Career ==
Voskobovich has been capped for the Belarus national team, appearing for the team during the 2019 FIFA Women's World Cup qualifying cycle.
