= Faroe Islands women's national football team =

Faroe Islands
- Nickname(s): Kvinnulandsliðið (Women's National Team)
- Association: Faroe Islands; Football Association (FSF)
- Confederation: UEFA (Europe)
- Head coach: Pætur Clementsen
- Captain: Ásla Johannesen
- Most caps: Heidi Sevdal (101)
- Top scorer: Heidi Sevdal (31)
- Home stadium: Tórsvøllur
- FIFA code: FRO
First colours	Second colours

FIFA ranking
- Current: 103 (20 October 2026)
- Highest: 60 (June 2009)
- Lowest: 113 (June 2024)

First international
- Official; Faroe Islands 0–2 Republic of Ireland (Toftir, Faroe Islands; 24 September 1995); Unofficial; Iceland 6–0 Faroe Islands (Kópavogur, Iceland; 25 June 1986)

Biggest win
- Faroe Islands 8–0 Andorra (Ħamrun, Malta; 6 April 2015)

Biggest defeat
- Faroe Islands 0–13 Norway (Tórshavn, Faroe Islands; 8 October 2019)

The Faroe Islands women's national football team represents the Faroe Islands in women's association football and is controlled by the Faroe Islands Football Association (FSF), the governing body of all football in the Faroe Islands. The FSF became a member of the International Federation of Association Football (FIFA) in 1988 and Union of European Football Associations (UEFA) in 1990. By population, it remains the fourth smallest member of UEFA, which encompasses the countries of Europe. The women's team played their first FIFA-sanctioned international match in 1995 and have never advanced to the finals of the FIFA Women's World Cup or UEFA Women's Championship. They took part in the Island Games in 2001, 2003 and 2005 and won all three tournaments, as well as appearing at the 2010 edition of the Algarve Cup. In the Faroe Islands, the team is known as the Kvinnulandsliðið.

== History ==
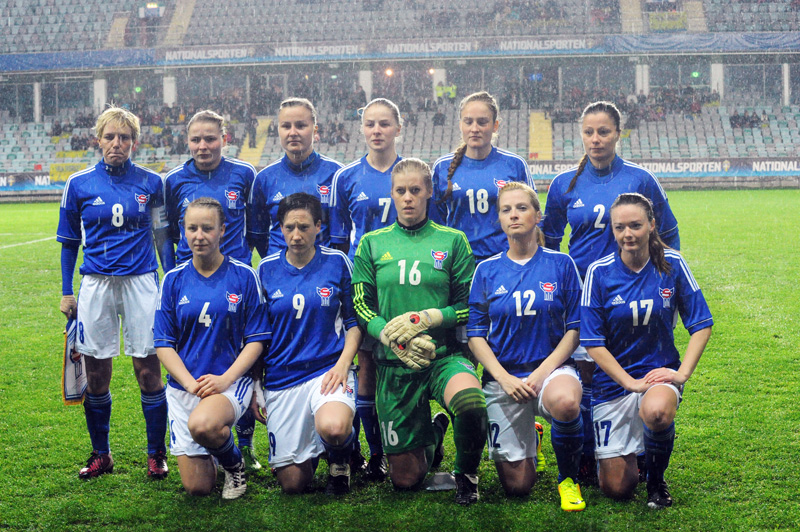
Faroe Islands national team in 2013

The FSF was founded on 13 January 1979 and a women's national league began play in 1985. The first Faroese women's national team games took place in June 1986, with two defeats to Iceland. The matches, a 6–0 defeat at Kópavogsvöllur and a 2–0 defeat at Akranesvöllur, predate the Faroe Islands' membership of FIFA and UEFA but are listed as full internationals at both FIFA.com and the official website of the Football Association of Iceland (KSÍ).

The Faroe Islands joined FIFA on 2 July 1988 and the male national team played its first official match—a 1–0 defeat against Iceland—on 24 August 1988. Membership of UEFA followed on 18 April 1990 and the Faroe Islands' male team entered its first major international competition later that year: the qualifying rounds for the 1992 UEFA European Football Championship.

A women's team was formed to take part in the 1997 UEFA Women's Championship qualification tournament, which began in September 1995. Páll Guðlaugsson was appointed as coach. The Faroe Islands were competing at class B, in a regionalised group alongside Belgium, Ireland, Scotland and Wales. The group winners would not qualify for the final tournament but would play-off against a last placed team from A class for promotion to the higher grade.

The Faroe Islands staged all their home games at the national stadium of the time, Svangaskarð in Toftir. On 24 September 1995 they lost their first ever home match 2–0 to Ireland. The following month, another 2–0 defeat, to Belgium in Brussels, preceded a 7–1 loss in Scotland where Sólvá Joensen scored the team's first ever goal. Two days later, on 25 October 1995, the Faroe Islands beat Wales 1–0 at Farrar Road in Bangor to record their first ever victory. Helga Ellingsgaard scored the decisive goal on 35 minutes, while opposition coach Sue Lopez lamented her team's failure to convert any of their 20 shots at goal.

The next match was a 3–1 defeat in Dublin, Ireland's third goal coming in the last minute. In 1996 the Faroe Islands finished their campaign with three home games, but lost them all. The first, on 18 May 1996, was a 9–0 defeat by group winners Belgium which remained the Faroe Islands' joint record defeat until 2019. Scotland and Wales departed Toftir with 3–0 and 1–0 victories, respectively, as the Faroe Islands finished bottom of the group with three points, having scored three goals and conceded 27.

The FSF scrapped their women's national team after the tournament, as they were unwilling to fund travel to away fixtures. They did enter competitions at youth level, which were not played on a home and away basis but were mini-tournaments staged in a single location to keep costs down.

When the senior women's national team was relaunched in 2004 after an eight-year hiatus, their first match was a 2–1 friendly defeat to Ireland. Irish coach Noel King named an experimental team which lacked his leading players from Arsenal Ladies. The game was staged in Klaksvík on 12 October 2004, the day before the nations' senior men's teams met at Lansdowne Road, Dublin.

In the next match, a return friendly with Ireland at the Oscar Traynor Centre in Dublin, Rannvá B. Andreasen put the Faroe Islands ahead after six minutes. Ireland hit back to win 2–1.

The Faroe Islands' first matches back in UEFA competition came in November 2006, at the UEFA Women's Euro 2009 qualifying series. At a preliminary round mini-tournament held in Strumica, Macedonia, Malena Josephsen's injury time goal in the first match was not enough to avert a 2–1 defeat to Wales. The team was eliminated after another defeat, 1–0 to Kazakhstan. In the final match the Faroe Islands beat hosts Macedonia 7–0 at Stadion Kukuš to record a record win which stood until 2015.

== Team image ==
=== Home stadium ===
The Faroe Islands women's national football team plays their home matches on the Tórsvøllur.

== Results and fixtures ==
The following is a list of match results in the last 12 months, as well as any future matches that have been scheduled.

Legend

Win Draw Loss Fixture

=== 2026 ===
2 March Unofficial Friendly	Cyprus	1–1	Faroe Islands	Larnaca, Cyprus
14:00	Hardy 13'	Report	Brændstrup 73'	Stadium: AEK Arena – Georgios Karapatakis

7 March 2027 FIFA Women's World Cup qualification	Greece	2–0	Faroe Islands	Heraklion, Greece
20:30	Sarri 2' (pen.); Koggouli 78'	Report		Stadium: Theodoros Vardinogiannis Stadium; Referee: Jeļena Jermolajeva (Lithuania)

14 April 2027 FIFA Women's World Cup qualification	Faroe Islands	2–3	Greece	Tórshavn,Faroe Islands
18:00 (17:00 UTC+1)	Johannesen 9'; Ryan 90+6'	Report	Moraitou 8'; Giannaka 53'; Drakogiannaki 78'	Stadium: Tórsvøllur; Attendance: 735; Referee: Hanna Laajanen (Sweden)

18 April 2027 FIFA Women's World Cup qualification	Faroe Islands	1–0	Georgia	Tórshavn, Faroe Islands
18:00 (17:00 UTC+1)	Brændstrup 90'	Report		Stadium: Tórsvøllur; Attendance: 728; Referee: Stacey Pearson (England)

5 June 2027 FIFA Women's World Cup qualification	Georgia	2–3	Faroe Islands	Tbilisi, Georgia
	Bebia 15' (pen.); Bukhrikidze 53'	Report	Zakariasardótti 45+3'; Joensen 87' (pen.); Mohr 90'	Stadium: David Petriashvili Stadium

9 October Friendly	Andorra	0–5	Faroe Islands	Andorra la Vella, Andorra
15:00 CET		Report	Tórolvsdóttir 22'; Brændstrup 66'; Shaki 76'; Djurhuus 83', 90+1'	Stadium: Estadi Nacional; Attendance: 100

12 October Friendly	Andorra	2–1	Faroe Islands	Andorra la Vella, Andorra
17:00 CET	Morato 16'; Bukhrikidze 63'	Report	Sevdal 47'	Stadium: Estadi Nacional; Attendance: 250

== Coaching staff ==
=== Current coaching staff ===
Position	Name	Ref.
Head coach	(Denmark) Signe Pries Andersen	

=== Manager history ===
- (Iceland) Páll Guðlaugsson (1995–1997)
- (Faroe Islands) Álvur Hansen (2001– May 2012)
- (Faroe Islands) Rúni Nolsøe 2012
- (Faroe Islands) Jón Pauli Olsen (2013–2015)
- (Faroe Islands) Pætur Clementsen (December 2015–2018)
- (Faroe Islands) John Petersen (2019–2020)
- (Denmark) Lene Terp (January 2021–2023)
- (Denmark) Signe Pries Andersen (2023–2024)
- (Faroe Islands) Pætur Clementsen (January 2025–)

== Players ==
=== Current squad ===
The following players were called up for the 2027 FIFA Women's World Cup qualification match against Georgia on 5 June 2026.

Caps and goals correct as of 5 June 2026, after the match against Georgia.

No.	Pos.	Player	Date of birth (age)	Caps	Goals	Club
1	GK	Óluva Joensen	21 April 2002 (age 24)	36	0	(Faroe Islands Football Association) KÍ Klaksvík
12	GK	Gunnvá Lützen	25 April 2005 (age 21)	3	0	(Faroe Islands Football Association) HB Tórshavn
3	DF	Birita Ryan	24 November 2002 (age 23)	48	3	(Faroe Islands Football Association) KÍ Klaksvík
11	DF	Sanna Svarvadal	14 November 2001 (age 25)	38	1	(Faroe Islands Football Association) KÍ Klaksvík
15	DF	Tórunn Joensen	27 September 1999 (age 27)	34	2	(Faroe Islands Football Association) KÍ Klaksvík
2	MF	Malena Olsen	19 May 2004 (age 22)	13	0	(Faroe Islands Football Association) KÍ Klaksvík
5	MF	Súsanna Godtfred	31 December 2006 (age 19)	1	0	(Faroe Islands Football Association) HB Tórshavn
6	MF	Heidi Sevdal	6 March 1989 (age 37)	102	31	(Faroe Islands Football Association) NSÍ Runavík
8	MF	Eyðvør Klakstein	5 September 1995 (age 31)	66	6	(Faroe Islands Football Association) KÍ Klaksvík
16	MF	Anna Brændstrup	23 July 2005 (age 21)	13	1	(Portuguese Football Federation) Gil Vicente
17	MF	Sólja Ernstsdóttir	5 September 2006 (age 20)	6	0	(Faroe Islands Football Association) KÍ Klaksvík
18	MF	Helga Mikkelsen	23 July 2007 (age 19)	1	0	(Faroe Islands Football Association) NSÍ Runavík
19	MF	Tóra Mohr	1 April 1999 (age 27)	16	1	(Faroe Islands Football Association) KÍ Klaksvík
20	MF	Durita Hummeland	21 March 1998 (age 28)	33	1	(Faroe Islands Football Association) KÍ Klaksvík
22	MF	Jancy Mohr	4 August 2005 (age 21)	5	0	(Faroe Islands Football Association) KÍ Klaksvík
4	MF	Natalia Dansdóttir Olsen	19 December 2006 (age 19)	0	0	(Faroe Islands Football Association) NSÍ Runavík
9	FW	Rakul Sørensen	21 July 2005 (age 21)	9	0	(Faroe Islands Football Association) Víkingur
10	FW	Brá Zakariasardóttir	15 October 2007 (age 19)	2	1	(Faroe Islands Football Association) HB Tórshavn
13	FW	Eydna Dalheim	1 December 2007 (age 18)	1	0	(Faroe Islands Football Association) Víkingur
14	FW	Mona Rasmusdóttir	2 November 2004 (age 22)	27	1	(Faroe Islands Football Association) Víkingur

=== Recent call ups ===
The following players have also been called up to the squad within the past 12 months.

Pos.	Player	Date of birth (age)	Caps	Goals	Club	Latest call-up
GK	Eyðgerð Berg	20 February 2001 (age 25)	4	0	(Faroe Islands) Víkingur	v. Greece, 14 April 2026
DF	Teresa Jacobsen	30 July 2006 (age 20)	5	0	(Faroe Islands) HB Tórshavn	v. Georgia, 18 April 2026
DF	Vár Johannesen	16 February 2006 (age 20)	2	0	(Faroe Islands) KÍ Klaksvík	v. Estonia, 27 October 2025
MF	Ásla Johannesen ^{WD} (captain)	9 May 1996 (age 30)	65	11	(Sweden) Piteå	v. Georgia, 5 June 2026
MF	Julia Mortensen ^{WD}	28 September 2000 (age 26)	36	2	(Faroe Islands) HB Tórshavn	v. Georgia, 5 June 2026
MF	Sara Shaki ^{WD}	19 December 2000 (age 25)	36	0	(Faroe Islands) HB Tórshavn	v. Georgia, 5 June 2026
MF	Rúna Jacobsen ^{WD}	5 February 1996 (age 30)	27	1	(Faroe Islands) HB Tórshavn	v. Georgia, 5 June 2026
MF	Maria Johansen	23 July 2004 (age 22)	2	0	(Faroe Islands) KÍ Klaksvík	v. Estonia, 27 October 2025
MF	Jonnhild á Sondum	12 May 2007 (age 19)	1	0	(Faroe Islands) NSÍ Runavík	v. Estonia, 27 October 2025
FW	Jensa Tórolvsdóttir ^{WD}	8 March 2001 (age 25)	46	6	(Faroe Islands) Víkingur	v. Georgia, 5 June 2026
FW	Fridrikka Clementsen	18 July 2003 (age 23)	23	0	(Iceland) IBV Vestmannaeyjar	v. Georgia, 18 April 2026
FW	Sunniva Willemoes	12 September 2003 (age 23)	20	3	(Denmark) Osterbro IF	v. Estonia, 27 October 2025
Notes: ^{INJ} = Withdrew due to injury; ^{PER} = Withdrew due to personal issue; ^{RET} = Retired from the national team; ^{WD} = Withdrew for unspecified reason

== Records ==
As of 5 June 2026

Players in bold are still active with the national team.

=== Most appearances ===
Rank	Player	Career	Caps	Goals
1	**Heidi Sevdal**	2006–present	102	31
2	Olga Kristina Hansen	2006–2022	68	5
3	**Eyðvør Klakstein**	2012–present	66	6
4	**Ásla Johannesen**	2014–present	64	11
5	Rannvá Andreasen	2004–2018	55	27
6	**Birita Ryan**	2020–present	48	3
7	**Jensa Tórolvsdóttir**	2020–present	46	6
8	"Ansy" Sevdal	2010–2022	43	0
9	Malena Josephsen	2004–2015	41	10
10	Randi Wardum	2004–2014	38	0

=== Top goalscorers ===
Rank	Player	Career	Goals	Caps	Avg.
1	**Heidi Sevdal**	2006–present	31	102	0.30
2	Rannvá B. Andreasen	2004–2018	27	55	0.49
3	**Ásla Johannesen**	2014–present	11	64	0.17
4	Malena Josephsen	2004–2015	10	41	0.24
5	**Jensa Tórolvsdóttir**	2020–present	6	46	0.13
5	**Eyðvør Klakstein**	2012–present	6	66	0.09
7	Milja Simonsen	2015–2018	5	21	0.24
7	Olga Kristina Hansen	2006–2022	5	68	0.07
9	Vivian Bjartalíð	2004–2007	3	5	0.60
9	Mona Breckmann	2008–2011	3	11	0.27
9	**Sunniva Willemoes**	2023–present	3	20	0.15
9	**Birita Ryan**	2020–present	3	48	0.06

=== Team records ===
On 28 November 2012 two of the players of the Faroe Islands women's national team set a world record. For the first time ever a parent and child played together in a football match for their country. Bára Skaale Klakkstein has played for many years now on the national team, Eyðvør has played for the U17 and U19 national teams, but on 28 November 2012 both mother and daughter played together in a friendly match against Luxembourg. The Faroe Islands won 6–0. Eyðvør was born on 5 September 1995 and was 17 years old when playing this match which was her first for the national team. The mother, Bára Skaale Klakkstein, was born on 24 March 1973 and was 39 years old, when she played the match against Luxembourg. Mother and daughter have played together on the KÍ women's best team since 2010.

== Honours ==
=== Regional ===
Women's Baltic Cup

- Champions: 2016
- Runners-up: 2021

=== Non-FIFA competitions ===
Island Games

- Champions: 2001, 2003, 2005

== Competitive record ==
=== FIFA Women's World Cup ===
FIFA Women's World Cup record									Qualification record						
Year	Result	Pld	W	D*	L	GF	GA	GD	Pld	W	D*	L	GF	GA	GD
(China) 1991 to (Germany) 2011	Did not enter								Did not participate						
(Canada) 2015	Did not qualify								13	2	3	8	9	45	−36
(France) 2019	Did not qualify								11	3	0	8	10	56	−46
(Australia) (New Zealand) 2023	Did not qualify								8	0	0	8	2	56	−54
(Brazil) 2027	To be determined								To be determined						
(Costa Rica) (Jamaica) (Mexico) (United States) 2031	To be determined								To be determined						
(United Kingdom) 2035	To be determined								To be determined						
Total	—	–	–	–	–	–	–	–	32	5	3	24	21	157	−136

*Draws include knockout matches decided on penalty kicks.

=== UEFA Women's Championship ===
UEFA Women's Championship record									Qualifying record								
Year	Result	Pld	W	D*	L	GF	GA	GD	Pld	W	D*	L	GF	GA	GD	P/R	Rnk
1984 to 1995	Did not enter								Did not participate								
(Norway) (Sweden) 1997	Did not qualify								8	1	0	7	3	27	−24	–	
(Germany) 2001	Did not enter								Did not enter								
(England) 2005	Did not enter								Did not enter								
(Finland) 2009	Did not qualify								3	1	0	2	8	3	+5	–	
(Sweden) 2013	Did not qualify								3	1	0	2	2	2	0	–	
(Netherlands) 2017	Did not qualify								3	2	0	1	12	4	+8	–	
(England) 2022	Did not qualify								7	0	0	7	1	42	−41	–	
(Switzerland) 2025	Did not qualify								6	3	0	3	11	9	+2	(Note: From Euro 2025 onwards a new qualifying format was introduced, linked to the Women's Nations League where teams are divided into leagues with promotion/relegation between the leagues at the end of each cycle.)	43rd
2029	To be determined								To be determined								
Total	—	–	–	–	–	–	–	–	30	8	0	22	37	87	−50	43rd	

*Draws include knockout matches decided on penalty kicks.

=== UEFA Women's Nations League ===
UEFA Women's Nations League record
Year	League	Group	Pos	Pld	W	D	L	GF	GA	P/R	Rnk
2023–24	C	3	4th	6	0	0	6	1	15	Same position	50th
2025	C	1	2nd	6	3	1	2	10	6	Same position	42nd
Total				12	3	1	8	11	21	42nd	

▲	Promoted at end of season
Same position	No movement at end of season
▼	Relegated at end of season
*	Participated in promotion/relegation play-offs

=== Island Games ===
Island Games record
Year	Result	GP	W	D	L	GS	GA
(Isle of Man) 2001	Champions	4	4	0	0	39	4
(Guernsey) 2003	Champions	4	4	0	0	34	2
(Shetland) 2005	Champions	5	5	0	0	33	2
(Rhodes) 2007 to present	Did not enter						
TOTAL	3 Titles	13	13	0	0	106	8

== See also ==
- Sport in Faroe Islands
  - Football in Faroe Islands
    - Women's football in Faroe Islands
- Faroe Islands women's national under-20 football team
- Faroe Islands women's national under-17 football team
- Faroe Islands men's national football team

== Bibliography ==
- Lopez, Sue (1997). Women on the Ball: A Guide to Women's Football. London, England: Scarlet Press. ISBN 1857270169.
