= Dimitra Giannakouli =

Greek footballer (born 1998)

Personal information
- Full name: Dimitra Giannakouli
- Date of birth: 8 May 1998 (age 28)
- Place of birth: Argos, Greece
- Position: Goalkeeper

Team information
- Current team: AEK Athens
- Number: 1

Senior career*
Years	Team	Apps	(Gls)
2012–2018	Feidon Argous		
2018–2020	Atromitos	22	(0)
2020–2021	Agia Paraskevi	11	(0)
2021–2022	Avantes Chalkidas	20	(0)
2022–2023	Ergotelis	16	(0)
2023–2024	Panathinaikos	15	(0)
2024–	AEK Athens	40	(0)

International career^{‡}
2014	Greece U17	1	(0)
2016	Greece U19	2	(0)
2019–	Greece	17	(0)
- * Club domestic league appearances and goals as of 25 May 2026 ‡ National team caps and goals as of 25 May 2026

Dimitra Giannakouli (born 8 May 1998) is a Greek footballer currently playing as a goalkeeper for AEK Athens in the Greek A Division and the Greek national team.

== Club career ==
=== Feidon Argous ===
Giannakouli joined Feidon Argous, the first women's football team in her hometown, in 2012 when the club was founded. In the 2015–16 season, she helped them get promoted to the Greek B Division after finishing on equal points with Kariatides Spartis who they later defeated in a decider match.

In the 2016–17 season, Feidon finished second in the third group of the Greek B Division. They competed against Agia Paraskevi in a playoff match for promotion to the Greek A Division. The game ended in a 1–1 draw and went into a penalty shoot-out. Giannakouli saved Agia Paraskevi's final penalty, while her teammate, Eirini Nefrou, scored and gave the win to Feidon. In the Greek Women's Cup, Dimitra helped her team reach the final where they faced PAOK. She played the full 90 minutes as her team lost 7–0.

In the 2017–18 season, Feidon finished in last place and got relegated back to the second division with only 1 win and 83 goals conceded.

=== Atromitos ===
She joined Greek A Division side Atromitos Athens in the summer of 2018 and stayed for two seasons. They finished 4th in 2018–19 and 3rd in 2019–20.

=== Agia Paraskevi ===
In the 2020–21 season, she joined newly promoted club Agia Paraskevi. She helped them finish in second place of the second group after only conceding one goal in 10 matches during regular season. They faced AEL in the playoff match for third place, but ultimately lost 2–0.

=== Avantes Chalkidas ===
She moved to A Division club Avantes Chalkidas in 2021 and she helped them finish at the top of the second group, conceding only 6 goals in 16 matches. They did not manage to win the league though as they came third in the playoffs round. Giannakouli won the PSAP Best Female Goalkeeper award for her performance during the 2021–22 season.

In July 2022, she renewed her contract with Avantes for the following season, but, due to problems with the administration, she and the rest of the team left the club.

=== Ergotelis ===
Giannakouli joined A Division club Ergotelis in November 2022 and helped them finish at the top of the second group undefeated. In the playoffs round, they came in second place after losing two matches against PAOK and Trikala 2011. In total she made 16 appearances for the team.

=== Panathinaikos ===
She joined newly promoted A Division club Panathinaikos on 19 July 2023. She kept 11 clean sheets in 17 appearances as they finished third in the league and reached the quarterfinals of the Greek Cup.

=== AEK ===
On 5 July 2024, Dimitra joined AEK. She was the first-choice goalkeeper as the team won the 2024–25 Greek A Division and the 2025 Greek Cup. She made 21 total appearances and kept 14 clean sheets, including a clean sheet in the cup final. Giannakouli made her UWCL debut in a 5–3 loss against Racing Union on 30 July 2025. She kept a clean sheet in AEK's second match against Flora Tallinn for third place in tournament 1 of the first qualifying round. She was awarded the PSAPP Best Goalkeeper title for her performance in the 2024–25 season and made the PSAPP Best XI. The following season, AEK finished second in the league and reached the semifinals of the cup. Giannakouli had 12 clean sheets in 29 matches in all competitions.

== International career ==
Giannakouli made her debut for the Greek U17 team on 30 September 2014 against the Faroe Islands in the final game of the 2015 UEFA Women's Under-17 Championship qualifying round. She kept a clean sheet as Greece won 3–0.

She made her debut for the Greek U19 team at the 2017 UEFA Women's Under-19 Championship qualifying round. She started the first two games against Slovenia and Russia in which she conceded a total of 6 goals.

She was called up by the senior team for the first time in 2019 for the UEFA Women's Euro 2022 qualifying, but she did not make her first appearance until 25 June 2022 during a friendly match against Portugal, in which she kept a clean sheet but was subbed off at halftime for Anthi Papakonstantinou. Giannakouli played her first full game for the national team a few months later in a 5–1 loss against France at the last match of the 2023 FIFA Women's World Cup qualification.

== Honours ==
=== Club ===
Feidon Argous

- Gamma Ethniki (1): 2015–16
- Greek Cup; runner-up: 2017

Ergotelis

- Greek A Division; runner-up: 2022–23

AEK

- Greek A Division (1): 2024–25; runner-up: 2025–26
- Greek Cup (1): 2025

=== Individual ===
- PSAPP Best Goalkeeper: 2021–22, 2024–25
- PSAPP Best XI: 2024–25
