= Georgia Pavlopoulou =

Greek footballer

Personal information
- Date of birth: 4 December 2004 (age 21)
- Place of birth: Larissa, Greece
- Position: Defender

Team information
- Current team: AEK Athens F.C.
- Number: 4

Youth career
- 2015–2017: AEL

Senior career*
Years	Team	Apps	(Gls)
2017–2022	AEL		
2022–	AEK		

International career^{‡}
2019	Greece U17	3	(0)
2021–2023	Greece U19	11	(0)
2025–	Greece	4	(0)
- * Club domestic league appearances and goals as of 5 March 2026 ‡ National team caps and goals as of 5 March 2026

Georgia Pavlopoulou (born 4 December 2004) is a Greek footballer currently playing as a defender for AEK Athens in the Greek A Division and the Greece national team.

== Club career ==
Georgia Pavlopoulou started playing football at the age of 10 in the academy of AEL before joining the senior team two years later. The team finished fifth and sixth in her first two seasons. In the 2019–20 season, they avoided relegation despite finishing 10th, due to the cancellation of the league during the COVID-19 pandemic and the reorganization of the league format for the 2020–21 season. In the following season, AEL finished second in their group, qualifying for a third-place match against Agia Paraskevi, which they won 2–0. In her final season, Pavlopoulou helped the team finish second in their group before winning two of four play-off matches to finish second overall in the league.

On 27 August 2022, Georgia Pavlopoulou joined AEK in the Greek B Division. She scored her first goal for the club in a 5–0 win against Chania. At the end of the season, AEK won promotion to the Greek A Division after two play-off victories against Nees Atromitou. In the 2023–24 season, the team finished sixth in the league and reached the final of the Greek Cup. The following season, Pavlopoulou made 24 appearances, helping AEK win both the league and the cup for the first time in their history. She made her Champions League debut in a 5–3 loss to Racing Union. She was named in the Team of the Season at the 2025 PSAPP awards. In December 2025, she suffered a proximal biceps tendon rupture and underwent surgery, causing her to miss the remainder of the 2025–26 season.

== International career ==
Georgia Pavlopoulou participated in the 2020 UEFA Women's Under-17 Championship qualification with the Greek U17 team and in the 2022 and 2023 UEFA Women's Under-19 Championship qualification with the Greek U19 team. She made her senior debut against Slovenia on 30 May 2025 in the UEFA Women's Nations League.

== Honours ==
AEL

- Greek A Division; runner-up: 2021–22

AEK

- Greek A Division: 2024–25
- Greek Cup: 2025; runner-up: 2024
- Greek B Division: 2022–23

Individual

- PSAPP Team of the Season: 2025
