= Maria Kapnisi =

Greek footballer

Personal information
- Date of birth: 3 June 1999 (age 27)
- Place of birth: Missolonghi, Greece
- Height: 1.74 m (5 ft 9 in)
- Position: Centre-back

Team information
- Current team: AEK Athens F.C.
- Number: 5

Senior career*
Years	Team	Apps	(Gls)
2011–2018	Messolonghi 2008		
2018–2023	Odysseas Moschatou		
2023–	AEK	60	(9)

International career^{‡}
2014–2016	Greece U17	4	(0)
2016–2018	Greece U19	5	(0)
2021–	Greece	12	(1)
- * Club domestic league appearances and goals as of 29 May 2026 ‡ National team caps and goals as of 29 May 2026

Maria Kapnisi (born 3 June 1999) is a Greek footballer currently playing as a defender for AEK in the Greek A Division and the Greek national team.

== Club career ==
=== Messolonghi 2008 ===
In 2011, Maria Kapnisi started training with Messolonghi 2008, her hometown's first women's football club. She made few appearances for the first team as they were promoted from the Greek second and third tier. In the 2017–18 season, she made 13 appearances and scored 2 goals in her first season in the Greek A Division.

=== Odysseas Moschatou ===
On September 8, 2018, Kapnisi joined A Division club AE Glyfadas, which later moved and changed its name to Odysseas Moschatou. She stayed for the next 5 seasons, helping the team reach thirf place in their group in the 2020–21 season and avoid relegation in the 2021–22 season, when she contributed 4 goals. In her last season, she was the top scorer of Odysseas with 8 goals, but they were ultimately relegated to the Greek B Division during the play-out round.

=== AEK ===
On August 16, 2023, Kapnisi joined newly–promoted AEK Athens. In the 2024–25 season, she captained the club to its first league and cup titles. She made 23 appearances, scoring 4 goals. She made her UWCL debut on 30 July 2025 against Racing Union. Kapnisi remained consistent in the 2025–26 season with 4 goals in 23 matches in all competitions, helping AEK finish second in the league and reach the cup semifinals.

== International career ==
Maria Kapnisi made her debut for the Greek U17 team on 27 September 2014 against Italy at the 2015 UEFA Women's Under-17 Championship qualifying round. She also made appearances off the bench in the 2016 and 2017 editions.

She made her debut for the Greek U19 team on 8 September 2016 against Slovenia at the 2017 UEFA Women's Under-19 Championship qualifying round. She also made appearances off the bench in the 2018 and 2019 editions.

She was called up by the senior team for the first time in 2021 for the 2023 FIFA Women's World Cup qualification, but she did not make her first appearance until 22 June 2022 during a friendly match against Portugal, when she came on as a substitute for Eirini Nefrou. Maria played her first full game for the national team a few months later in an 1–0 friendly win over Cyprus. She also made appearances off the bench in the 2023 World Cup qualifiers and the 2023–24 Nations League. On 25 February 2024, she scored her first goal in a 2–1 friendly win against Turkey.

== Honours ==
Messolonghi 2008

- Gamma Ethniki (1): 2013–14
- Greek B Division (1): 2016–17

AEK

- Greek A Division (1): 2024–25
- Greek Cup (1): 2025
