= 2026–27 Greek Women's Cup =

Κύπελλο Ελλάδας Γυναικών

Tournament details
- Country: Greece
- Dates: 21 October 2025 – TBD
- Teams: 29

The 2026–27 Greek Women's Cup is the 12th edition of the Greek women's association football national cup organized by the Hellenic Football Federation (HFF). PAOK are the defending champions.

== Schedule and format ==
Participation is mandatory for all top division clubs and optional for the rest. In the first phase, teams from the second and third divisions will be divided into two groups. Group A will consist of seven teams from the regions of Macedonia and Thrace, while Group B will consist of ten teams from the rest of Greece. Eight teams will advance to the second phase, where they will compete for qualification to the third phase. In the third phase, Group A will consist of the four teams that qualified from the second phase, along with Kifisia, Volos, Seirines Grevenon and PAS Pyrgos, while Group B will consist of the remaining clubs from the top division.

All ties are played in a single-match decider at the home ground of the lower division opponent. If both sides belong to the same tier, a draw will be held. In the quarterfinals and semifinals, ties will be played over two legs.

Round	Draw date	Match date	Fixtures	Clubs	Divisions entering this round
First round	5 October	21 October–4 November	9	17 → 8	8 B Division teams 9 Gamma Ethniki teams
Second round	5 October	11 November	4	8 → 4	None
Third round	18 November	9–16 December	8	16 → 8	12 A Division teams
Quarter-finals			4	8 → 4	None
Semi-finals			4	4 → 2	None
Final			1	2 → 1	None

== Preliminary round ==
During the draw held on 5 October 2026, Shooters and Anagennisi Alexandroupolis were drawn to play a preliminary match, with the winner advancing to face Vasilissa Thrakis for a place in the second round.

21 October 2026	Shooters WFC	10–0	Anagennisi Alexandroupolis	Filyro, Thessaloniki
16:00 EEST	Sotiriou 26', 39', 55', 80'; Mantzouki 38'; Tourta 72'; Siskou 76'; Katemliadou 83', 86'; Papadopoulou 88'	Report		Stadium: Filyro Municipal Stadium; Referee: Georgios Aslanidis (Pieria)

== First round ==
The draw was completed by the HFF on 5 October 2026.

21 October 2026	Pontiakos Alexandroupolis	0–4	Aris Thessalonikis	Palagia, Alexandroupoli
16:00 EEST		Report	Iliadi 20'; Kechagia 47'; Kostara 79'; Berati 90'	Stadium: Palagia Stadium; Referee: Eleftherios Amoiropoulos (Thrace)

21 October 2026	Rodopi ’87	0–4	Doxa 2016	Komotini
16:00 EEST		Report	Wannamaker 62', 65', 70'; Husein 90' (o.g.)	Stadium: Komotini Municipal Stadium; Referee: Panagiotis Tsopoulidis (Xanthi)

21 October 2026	Diethnis Akadimia 3B	0–4	Atlas Epirus	Vari, East Attica
13:00 EEST		Report	Farmaki 20'; Lagkari 45+1'; Lenti 71' (pen.); Varsani 83'	Stadium: Vari Municipal Stadium; Referee: Niki Georgiadou (Athens)

21 October 2026	Marko	1–1 (3–1 p)	Mykonos	Kouvaras, East Attica
14:00 EEST	Moskofidou 77' (pen.)	Report	Malliari 64'	Stadium: Kouvaras Stadium; Referee: Georgios Christodoulou (Athens)

21 October 2026	Fostiras Kaisarianis	2–1	Kalloni	Kaisariani, Athens
15:00 EEST	Siskou 50', 78'	Report	Valeri 90+3'	Stadium: Kaisariani Municipal Stadium ″Michalis Kritikopoulos″ Referee: Christoforos Asprogiannis (West Attica)

21 October 2026	Chania	1–1 (6–7 p)	Atromitos	Chania
16:00 EEST	Fragkedi 22'	Report	Poursanidi 77'	Stadium: Monachi Elia Municipal Stadium; Referee: Rafail Stavroulakis (Rethymno)

25 October 2026	Ethnikos Piraeus	8–0	Diagoras Rachon	Tavros, Athens
11:30 EET	Xera 28'; Gatoudi 32'; M. Georgakopoulou 34', 35', 70'; Andrikopoulou 47'; Pateraki 58'; Lappa 90'			Stadium: Tavros Municipal Stadium "Charis Pavlidis"; Referee: Charalampos Psaridis (Athens)

4 November 2026	Shooters WFC	0–0 (3–2 p)	Vasilissa Thrakis	Pylaia, Thessaloniki
15:00 EET		Report		Stadium: Pylaia Municipal Stadium "Antonis Karabourniotis"; Referee: Eirini Piggiou (Chalkidiki)

== Second round ==
11 November 2026	Shooters WFC	0–4	Aris Thessalonikis	Filyro, Thessaloniki
15:00 EET		Report	Iliadi 53'; Koutsi 59'; Schortsianiti 87'; Papadopoulou 90+1'	Stadium: Filyro Municipal Stadium; Referee: Lampros Lamprou (Macedonia)

11 November 2026	Atromitos	0–0 (4–3 p)	Doxa 2016	Peristeri, Athens
15:00 EET		Report		Stadium: Chorafa Municipal Stadium; Referee: Stavroula Lampropoulou (Piraeus)

11 November 2026	Ethnikos Piraeus	5–1	Fostiras Kaisarianis	Tavros, Athens
15:00 EET	Koukouvou 7' (o.g.); Xera 57'; Loli 65'; Gatoudi 79'; Pateraki 81'	Report	Siskou 50'	Stadium: Tavros Municipal Stadium "Charis Pavlidis"; Referee: Vasilios Lamprou (West Attica)

11 November 2026	Marko	6–1	Atlas Epirus	Kouvaras, East Attica
15:00 EET	Saridaki 7'; Zerva 16'; Moskofidou 34', 67'; Mpada 56'; Ntzani 65'	Report	Lagkari 6'	Stadium: Kouvaras Stadium; Referee: Zoi Christodoulou (Boeotia)

== Third round ==
The draw was completed by the HFF on 18 November 2026, at the federation's headquarters in Athens.

9 December 2026	Volos	v	Odysseas Moschatou	Volos
15:00 EET				Stadium: Olga Vasdeki Sports Center

9 December 2026	Ethnikos Piraeus	v	AEK	Tavros, Athens
15:00 EET				Stadium: Tavros Municipal Stadium "Charis Pavlidis"

9 December 2026	Kifisia	v	Panathinaikos	Kamatero, Athens
15:00 EET				Stadium: Kamatero Municipal Stadium

9 December 2026	PAS Pyrgos	v	Agia Paraskevi	Pyrgos
15:00 EET				Stadium: Pyrgos Stadium

9 December 2026	Aris Thessalonikis	v	OFI	Evosmos, Thessaloniki
15:00 EET				Stadium: Municipal Athletic Park of Evosmos "Maroko"

9 December 2026	Seirines Grevenon	v	REA	Grevena
15:00 EET				Stadium: Grevena Association Stadium

9 December 2026	Atromitos	v	Asteras Tripolis	Peristeri, Athens
15:00 EET				Stadium: Chorafa Municipal Stadium

9 December 2026	Marko	v	PAOK	Kouvaras, East Attica
15:00 EET				Stadium: Kouvaras Stadium

== Statistics ==
As of 11 November 2026

Rank	Player	Club	Goals
1	(Greece) Sofia Sotiriou	Shooters	4
2	(United States) Sierra Wannamaker	Doxa 2016	3
2	(Greece) Marina Georgakopoulou	Ethnikos	3
2	(Greece) Maria Siskou	Fostiras	3
2	(Greece) Vasiliki Moskofidou	Marko	3
3	(Greece) Sofia Iliadi	Aris	2
3	(Greece) Maria Lagkari	Atlas Epirus	2
3	(Greece) Efrosini Xera	Ethnikos	2
3	(Greece) Eirini Gatoudi	Ethnikos	2
3	(Greece) Anthi Pateraki	Ethnikos	2
3	(Greece) Kalliopi Katemliadou	Shooters	2
