= Matina Ntarzanou =

Greek footballer

Personal information
- Full name: Stamatia Ntarzanou
- Date of birth: 8 June 2005 (age 21)
- Place of birth: Athens, Greece
- Position: Defender

Team information
- Current team: Panathinaikos

Youth career
- 2015–2018: Athinaiki

Senior career*
Years	Team	Apps	(Gls)
2018–2019	Athinaiki	7	(2)
2019–2020	Odysseas Glyfadas	10	(1)
2020–2021	Agia Paraskevi	11	(4)
2021–2025	Panathinaikos	60	(29)
2025–2026	Pogoń Szczecin	9	(1)
2026–	Panathinaikos	1	(0)

International career^{‡}
2021–2022	Greece U17	4	(0)
2022–2024	Greece U19	15	(3)
2025–	Greece	7	(0)
- * Club domestic league appearances and goals as of 20 September 2026 ‡ National team caps and goals as of 20:08, 2 June 2026 (UTC)

Matina Ntarzanou (Greek: Ματίνα Νταρζάνου; born 8 June 2005) is a Greek professional footballer who plays as a defender for Greek A Division club Panathinaikos and the Greek national team.

== Club career ==
=== Early years ===
Matina Ntarzanou began her football career at the youth academy of Athinaiki. She made her senior debut in the Greek second division during the 2018–19 season at just 13 years old. The following season, she transferred to top-flight club Odysseas Glyfadas, where she made 10 appearances and scored one goal, contributing to the team's 7th-place finish. In the summer of 2020, Ntarzanou signed with Agia Paraskevi. During her time there, she made 11 appearances and scored four goals as the club finished in 4th place.

=== Panathinaikos ===
On 9 August 2021, Ntarzanou joined the newly established women's football team of Panathinaikos, competing in the Greek third division. In her debut season, she played a pivotal role in the club's promotion to the second division, finishing as the group's top scorer with 11 goals in six matches. On 11 July 2022, she transferred to Greek A Division club Avantes Chalkidas. She participated in the club's preseason, but, due to problems with the administration, she and the rest of the team left the club before the season began. She then returned to Panathinaikos, where she scored 10 goals in 13 appearances, helping the club secure promotion to the top division for the first time in its history. In the 2023–24 season, she was a key player in Panathinaikos' third-place league finish. The following season, she recorded six goals in 21 appearances as the club finished as league's runners-up and reached the final of the Greek Cup.

=== Pogoń Szczecin ===
On 16 July 2025, Ntarzanou signed a two-year contract with Polish club Pogoń Szczecin. After her debut against UKS SMS Łódź, she suffered an injury that kept her out for the first half of the season. Returning in 2026, she made 10 more appearances as the club finished second in the league and reached the semifinals of the Polish Cup.

=== Return to Panathinaikos ===
On 4 August 2026, she returned to Panathinaikos.

== International career ==
Ntarzanou represented Greece at youth international level, participating in the 2022 UEFA Women's Under-17 Championship qualification with the Greek U17 team, as well as in the 2023 and 2024 UEFA Women's Under-19 Championship qualification with the U19s. On 11 April 2023, she scored twice in a 4–0 victory over Bosnia and Herzegovina and, on 3 April 2024, she recorded a goal and an assist in a 2–2 draw against Denmark.

She made her senior debut on 25 February 2025 in a 1–0 loss against Turkey in the 2025 UEFA Women's Nations League, when she came off the bench in the 70th minute for Athanasia Moraitou.

== Career statistics ==
As of match played 23 May 2026

Appearances and goals by club, season and competition
Club	Season	League			National cup (Note: Includes Greek Cup, Polish Cup)		Continental		Total	
Club	Season	Division	Apps	Goals	Apps	Goals	Apps	Goals	Apps	Goals
Athinaiki	2018–19	Greek B Division	7	2	—		—		7	2
Odysseas Glyfadas	2019–20	Greek A Division	10	1	—		—		10	1
Agia Paraskevi	2020–21	Greek A Division	11	4	—		—		11	4
Panathinaikos	2021–22	Greek C Division	6	11	—		—		6	11
Panathinaikos	2022–23	Greek B Division	13	10	—		—		13	10
Panathinaikos	2023–24	Greek A Division	24	3	2	0	—		26	3
Panathinaikos	2024–25	Greek A Division	17	5	4	1	—		21	6
Panathinaikos	Total		60	29	6	1	—		66	30
Pogoń Szczecin	2025–26	Ekstraliga	9	1	2	0	—		11	1
Career total			97	37	8	1	0	0	105	38

== Honours ==
Panathinaikos

- Greek A Division runner-up: 2024–25
- Greek B Division: 2022–23
- Gamma Ethniki: 2021–22
- Greek Cup runner-up: 2025

Pogoń Szczecin

- Ekstraliga runner-up: 2025–26

Individual

- PSAPP Best Young Player: 2024–25
- PSAPP Best XI: 2024–25
