= Panagiota Chatzicharistou =

Greek footballer (born 2000)

Yiota Chatzicharistou
Personal information
- Full name: Panagiota Chatzicharistou
- Date of birth: 14 November 2000 (age 25)
- Place of birth: Serres, Greece
- Height: 1.75 m (5 ft 9 in)
- Position: Goalkeeper

Team information
- Current team: Odysseas Moschatou W.F.C.

Senior career*
Years	Team	Apps	(Gls)
2014–2017	Panserraiki		
2017–2018	Amazones Dramas		
2019–2020	PAOK	2	(0)
2020–2021	Lokomotiv Plovdiv		
2021–2023	PAOK	13	(0)
2023–2024	AEK	26	(0)
2024–2026	Panathinaikos	13	(0)
2026–	Odysseas Moschatou		

International career^{‡}
2015–2017	Greece U17	2	(0)
2017–2019	Greece U19	5	(0)
2020–	Greece	9	(0)
- * Club domestic league appearances and goals as of 4 June 2026 ‡ National team caps and goals as of 19 August 2024

Panagiota Chatzicharistou (born 14 November 2000) is a Greek footballer currently playing as a goalkeeper for Odysseas Moschatou in the Greek A Division and the Greek national team.

== Club career ==
=== Panserraiki ===
Chatzicharistou started her career in her hometown club Panserraiki which played in the Greek second division. In the 2014/15 season, they were relegated to the third tier from which they bounced back in 2015/16 after an undefeated season.

=== Amazones Dramas ===
In 2017, she joined Amazones Dramas in the Greek A Division where she stayed for one season before the club was dissolved in 2018.

=== PAOK ===
In 2019, she joined Greek champions PAOK. They went on to have a perfect season and they were awarded the title after the second half of the season was cancelled due to the COVID-19 pandemic.

=== Lokomotiv Plovdiv ===
In 2020, she moved to Bulgarian club Lokomotiv Plovdiv and she helped them finish second in the league.

=== Return to PAOK ===
On 24 June 2021, she returned to PAOK. In 2021/22, she made 9 appearances as her club had an unbeaten season. In 2022/23, she made 4 appearances and PAOK won their 9th consecutive title.

=== AEK ===
On 25 July 2023, Panagiota joined newly promoted club AEK. She was the first-choice goalkeeper for the team as they finished 6th in the league and reached the final of the 2024 Greek Cup in which they lost on penalties to PAOK.

=== Panathinaikos ===
On 19 July 2024, she signed for Panathinaikos. She was the second-choice goalkeeper but managed to keep four clean sheets in her seven appearances during the 2024–25 season while her club finished second in the league and reached the cup final. In the 2025–26 season, she made eight appearances and kept three clean sheets.

=== Odysseas Moschatou ===
On 2 July 2026, she transferred to another Athens-based club, Odysseas Moschatou.

== Honours ==
Panserraiki

- Gamma Ethniki: 2015–16

Lokomotiv Plovdiv

- Bulgarian League; runner-up: 2020–21

PAOK

- Greek A Division (3): 2019–20, 2021–22, 2022–23

AEK

- Greek Cup; runner-up: 2024

Panathinaikos

- Greek A Division; runner-up: 2024–25
- Greek Cup; runner-up: 2025
