= Despoina Chatzinikolaou =

Greek footballer (born 1999)

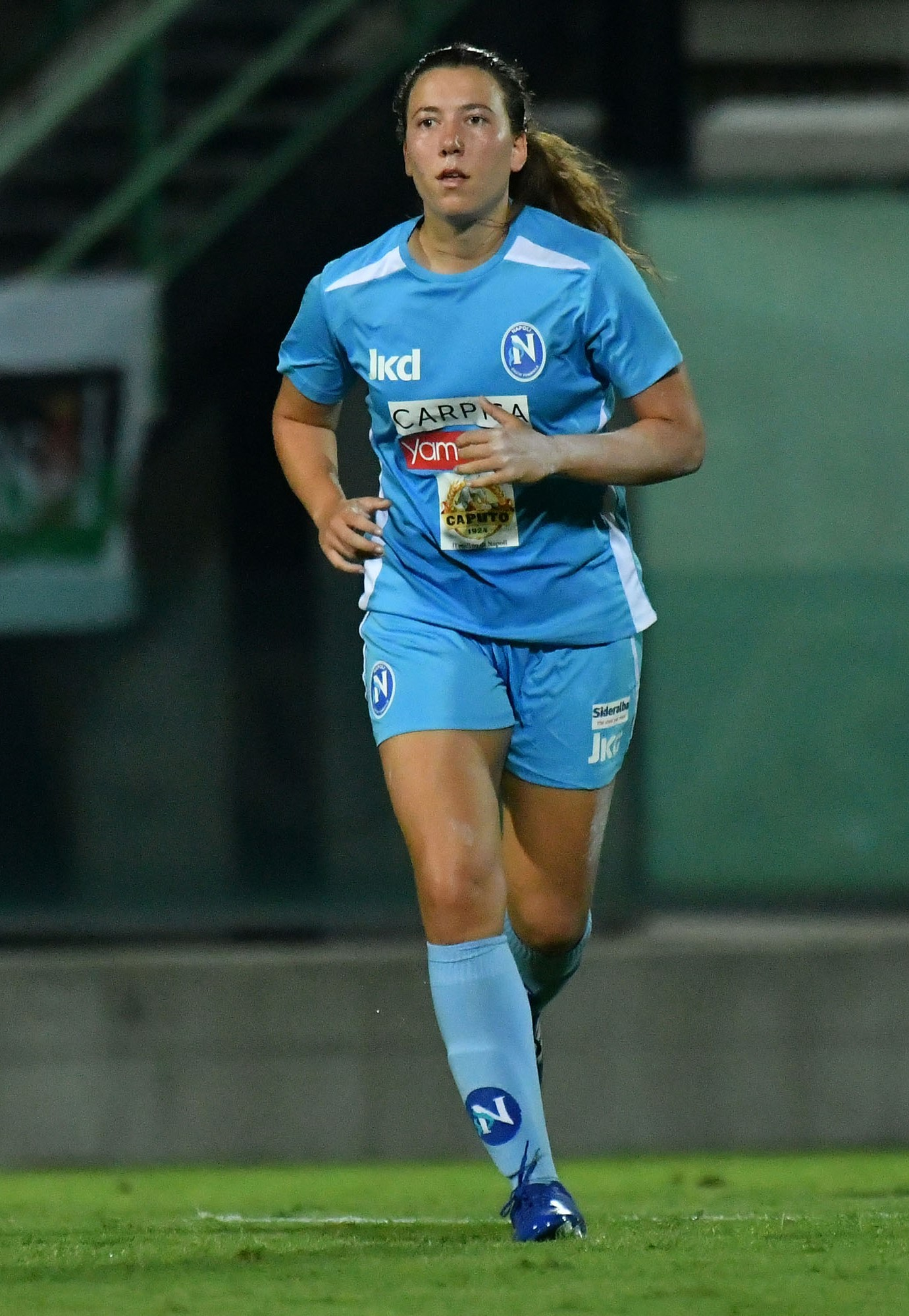
- Despoina Chatzīnikolaou playing for Napoli Femminile

Personal information
- Date of birth: 21 October 1999 (age 27)
- Place of birth: Marousi, Greece
- Position: Striker

Team information
- Current team: AEK Athens
- Number: 9

Senior career*
Years	Team	Apps	(Gls)
2012–2016	Odysseas Glyfadas		
2016–2018	Amazones Dramas		
2018–2019	Aris Thessaloniki		
2019–2022	Napoli	26	(11)
2022–2023	Lazio	23	(13)
2023–	AEK Athens	0	(0)

International career^{‡}
2014–2016	Greece U17	7	(7)
2016–2018	Greece U-19	9	(3)
2019–	Greece	11	(1)
- * Club domestic league appearances and goals as of 22 August 2023 ‡ National team caps and goals as of 25 June 2023

Despoina Chatzinikolaou (Greek: Δέσποινα Χατζηνικολάου; born 21 October 1999) is a Greek footballer who plays as a forward for Greek club AEK Athens women's team. She has been a member of the Greece women's national team. Previous teams she has playerd for include Napoli, Lazio, Aris Thessalonikis, Amazones Dramas and Odysseas Glyfadas.

== Honours ==
Odysseas Glyfadas

- Greek Cup;runner-up : 2015

Napoli

- Serie B (1): 2019/20

AEK

- Greek A Division (1): 2024/25
- Greek Cup (1): 2025

Individual

- PSAPP Best Greek Player: 2024/25
- PSAPP Best XI: 2024/25
