= Fani Doiranli =

Greek footballer

Personal information
- Full name: Fani Doiranli
- Date of birth: 7 August 1998 (age 28)
- Position: Defender

Team information
- Current team: Asteras Tripolis F.C.

Senior career*
| Years | Team | Apps | (Gls) |
| 2014–2025 | PAOK | | |
| 2025–2026 | OFI | 21 | (2) |
| 2026– | Asteras Tripolis | | |

International career^{‡}
| 2014 | Greece U17 | 3 | (0) |
| 2015–2016 | Greece U19 | 6 | (0) |
| 2022– | Greece | 4 | (0) |
- * Club domestic league appearances and goals as of 11 August 2026 ‡ National team caps and goals as of 23 July 2023

Fani Doiranli (born 7 August 1998) is a Greek footballer currently playing as a defender for Asteras Tripolis in the Greek A Division and the Greek national team.

== Club career ==
Fani Doiranli joined A Division club PAOK in 2014. During her time at the team, she has helped them win the league every season, 9 times in total, as well as the three last editions of the Greek Cup.

In the 2019/20 season, she made her UEFA Women's Champions League debut in a 0–1 loss to LSK Kvinner during the qualifying round when she came on in the 84th minute for Chara Dimitriou. In the league, she started in 5 games and came off the bench in 6, while scoring 1 goal, in a season where PAOK went undefeated with 14 wins and only 1 goal conceded. The title was awarded to them after the remaining matches were suspended due to the COVID-19 pandemic.

In 2022/23, she played her first full match in the UEFA Women's Champions League in a 2–0 win over Swansea City in the qualifying round. She also started in the next game against Rangers, but PAOK lost 0–4. In the league, she started in 18 matches as her club were crowned Greek champions for the ninth year in a row.

== International career ==
Doiranli made her debut for the Greek U17 team on 25 September 2014 against Norway in the 2015 UEFA Women's Under-17 Championship qualifying round when she was subbed on for Eleni-Olga Stefatou in the 72nd minute. She started in the next game against Italy two days later and also came off the bench in Greece's only win against the Faroe Islands.

She made her debut for the Greek U19 team at the 2016 UEFA Women's Under-19 Championship qualifying round. She played in all three games, helping her team qualify to the elite round. She was called up again for the 2017 edition of the tournament. In total, she made 6 appearances for Greece U19.

She made her debut for the senior team on 6 September 2022 in the last match of the 2023 FIFA Women's World Cup qualification when she came on in the 57th minute for Maria Mitkou.

== Personal life ==
On May 9, 2022, Doiranli became the first woman to cast her ballot at a Greek professional footballers’ association (PSAPP) election.

== Honours ==
PAOK

- Greek A Division (10): 2014–15, 2015–16, 2016–17, 2017–18, 2018–19, 2019–20, 2020–21, 2021–22, 2022–23, 2023–24
- Greek Cup (4): 2014–15, 2015–16, 2017, 2024
