= Eleni Kakambouki =

Greek footballer (born 1987)

Personal information
- Date of birth: 10 May 1987 (age 39)
- Place of birth: Agrinio, Greece
- Position: Midfielder

Team information
- Current team: Marko WFC

Senior career*
Years	Team	Apps	(Gls)
2004–2006	Acheloos Neochoriou		
2006–2011	Aegina		
2012–2014	Odysseas Glyfadas		
2014–2021	PAOK		
2021–2022	Lugano	16	(0)
2022–2023	Lazio	32	(1)
2023–2024	Panathinaikos	21	(1)
2024–2025	PAOK	9	(1)
2025	AEK	11	(0)
2026	Panetolikos	8	(4)
2026–	Marko	1	(0)

International career^{‡}
2005–2006	Greece U19	3	(1)
2005–2025	Greece	116	(3)
- * Club domestic league appearances and goals as of 22 October 2026 ‡ National team caps and goals as of 4 June 2025

Eleni Kakambouki (Greek: Ελένη Κακαμπούκη; born 10 May 1987) is a Greek footballer who plays as a midfielder for Marko WFC in the Gamma Ethniki. She was the captain of the Greek women's national team.

== Career ==
Kakambouki has been capped for the Greece national team, appearing for the team during the 2019 FIFA Women's World Cup qualifying cycle.

== International goals ==
No.	Date	Venue	Opponent	Score	Result	Competition
1.	25 August 2010	Arta Municipal Stadium, Arta, Greece	Bulgaria	1–0	1–2	2011 FIFA Women's World Cup qualification
2.	8 April 2017	Selman Stërmasi Stadium, Tirana, Albania	Kosovo	3–0	6–0	2019 FIFA Women's World Cup qualification

== Honours ==
Acheloos Neochoriou

- Greek B Division (1): 2004/05

PAOK

- Greek A Division (7): 2014/15, 2015/16, 2016/17, 2017/18, 2018/19, 2019/20, 2020/21
- Greek Cup (3): 2014/15, 2015/16, 2016/17

Lazio

- Serie B; runner-up:2022/23

AEK

- Greek A Division (1): 2024/25
- Greek Cup (1): 2025
