= Zoi Nasi =

Greek footballer (born 2000)

Personal information
- Full name: Zoi Nasi
- Date of birth: 28 April 2000 (age 26)
- Place of birth: Katerini, Greece
- Position: Goalkeeper

Team information
- Current team: AEK Athens F.C.

Senior career*
Years	Team	Apps	(Gls)
2014	Pierides Mouses		
2014–2015	Volos 2004		
2015–2018	AEL		
2018–2021	PAOK	18	(0)
2021–2024	Trikala 2011	42	(3)
2024–2026	Panathinaikos	32	(0)
2026–	AEK		

International career^{‡}
2015–2017	Greece U17	12	(0)
2018–2019	Greece U19	5	(0)
2019–	Greece	16	(0)
- * Club domestic league appearances and goals as of 29 May 2026 ‡ National team caps and goals as of 4 June 2025

Zoi Nasi (born 28 April 2000) is a Greek footballer currently playing as a goalkeeper for AEK Athens in the Greek A Division and the Greek national team.

== Club career ==
=== Volos ===
After spending half a season in the Gamma Ethniki with Pierides Mouses, Nasi joined Greek A Division club Volos 2004. In her first and only season, they got relegated to the second division.

=== AEL ===
The following season, she signed for newly promoted club AEL in the Greek B Division. She helped them win their second promotion in a row as they finished at the top of the first group. In the club's first appearance in the top division, they finished 4th in 2017 and 5th in 2018.

=== PAOK ===
In the summer of 2018, Nasi joined A Division champions PAOK. In her first season, she made 9 appearances as her team went on to win the league undefeated. In the 2019–20 season, she only made 5 appearances before she picked up an ACL injury during training on 12 December 2019, missing the rest of the season. PAOK had a back-to-back perfect season. In the 2020–21 season, most of the matches were cancelled due to the COVID-19 pandemic. Nasi only played in 4 out of 11 games as PAOK did not lose a single game.

=== Trikala ===
On 21 October 2021, Nasi joined A Division club Trikala 2011. In her first season, she only conceded twice in 9 appearances as the club finished third in the first group of the division, just missing out on the playoffs round. In the 2022–23 season, she kept 6 clean sheets in 14 appearances. Trikala finished second in their group and qualified for the playoffs, where they only managed to finish in 5th place. In the final match of the season, Nasi came on as a substitute in the 85th minute for midfielder Angelina Voutsina and scored the last goal of the game. In the 2023 PSAPP awards, she was voted the Best Goalkeeper of the 2022–23 season. In 2023–24, she kept 11 clean sheets in 21 total appearances as her club finished 7th in the league and reached the quarterfinals of the Greek Cup. She scored 2 penalties, against Elpides Karditsas and AEL.

=== Panathinaikos ===
On 10 July 2024, she joined Panathinaikos. She kept 10 clean sheets in 17 appearances, playing a key role in the team's second–place finish in the league and their run to the cup final where they lost to AEK. In the 2025–26 season, she made 18 appearances, keeping 9 clean sheets.

=== AEK ===
On 22 July 2026, she moved to another Athens club, AEK.

== International career ==
Nasi made her debut for the Greek U17 team on 23 October 2015 against Portugal in the 2016 UEFA Women's Under-17 Championship qualification, where she helped her country reach the elite round. She also competed in the 2017 edition. In total, she made 12 appearances for Greece U17, keeping 5 clean sheets and conceding 16 goals.

She made her debut for the Greek U19 team on 28 August 2018 against Serbia in the 2019 UEFA Women's Under-19 Championship qualification. They managed to qualify for the elite round, but they finished last in their group. In total, she made 5 appearances for Greece U19, keeping only 1 clean sheet and conceding 11 goals.

She was called up for the first time by the senior team for the UEFA Women's Euro 2022 qualifying round, but she did not make her debut until 2 September 2022 against Wales in the 2023 FIFA Women's World Cup qualification.

== Personal life ==
She is the daughter of former Pierikos goalkeeper, Panagiotis Nasis.

== Honours ==
=== Club ===
AEL

- Greek B Division (1): 2015–16

PAOK

- Greek A Division (3): 2018–19, 2019–20, 2020–21

=== Individual ===
- PSAPP Best Goalkeeper: 2022–23
