= Maireth Pérez =

Colombian footballer (born 2001)

Personal information
- Full name: Maireth Alejandra Pérez Ramírez
- Date of birth: 31 March 2001 (age 25)
- Place of birth: Valledupar, Colombia
- Height: 1.62 m (5 ft 4 in)
- Positions: Midfielder; forward

Team information
- Current team: AEK Athens
- Number: 13

Youth career
- –2017: Envigado
- –2018: CD Formas Íntimas

Senior career*
Years	Team	Apps	(Gls)
2019	Independiente Medellín	7	(3)
2020–2022	Ñañas	17	(14)
2023	Millonarios	10	(3)
2023	Hapoel Jerusalem		
2024–	AEK Athens	15	(5)

International career^{‡}
2018	Colombia U17	8	(7)
2018	Colombia U18	1	(0)
2020–	Colombia U20	8	(3)
2019–	Colombia	1	(0)
- * Club domestic league appearances and goals as of 6 June 2025 ‡ National team caps and goals as of 11 March 2020

Maireth Alejandra Pérez Ramírez (born 31 March 2001) is a Colombian footballer who plays as a midfielder for the Greek A Division club AEK Athens and the Colombia women's national team.

== International career ==
Pérez made her senior debut for Colombia on 9 November 2019.

== Honours ==
Ñañas

- Superliga Femenina: 2022

AEK Athens

- Greek A Division: 2024/25
- Greek Cup: 2025
