= Tatiana Georgiou =

Greek footballer

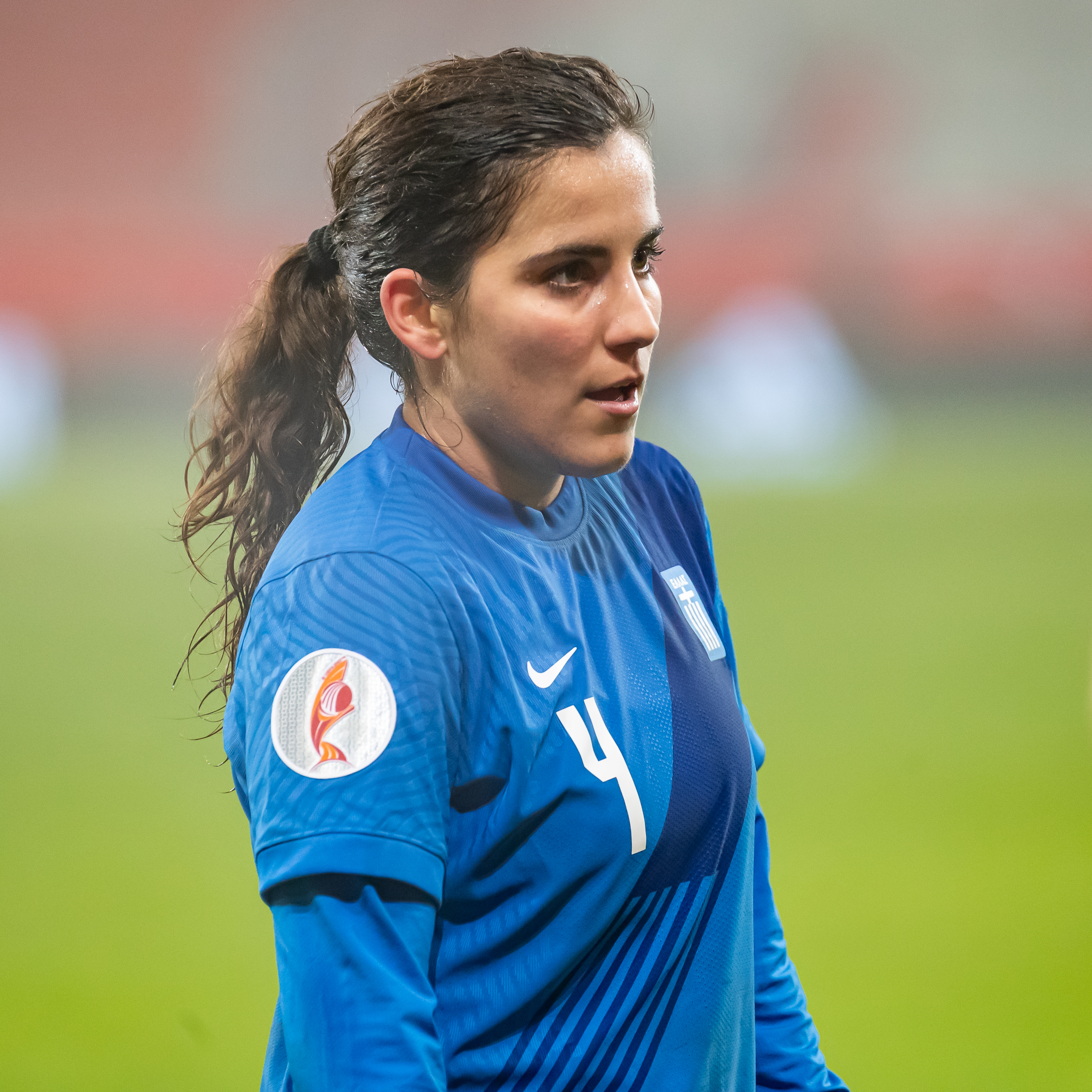

Personal information
- Date of birth: 4 January 1996 (age 30)
- Place of birth: Igoumenitsa, Greece
- Position: Midfielder

Team information
- Current team: AEK Athens
- Number: 6

Youth career
- 2008–2012: Amazones Thesprotia

Senior career*
Years	Team	Apps	(Gls)
2012–2014	Amazones Thesprotia		
2014–2019	PAOK	95	(25)
2019–2020	Napoli	10	(0)
2020–2022	Cesena	55	(2)
2022–2023	Olimpija Ljubljana	25	(9)
2023–2024	Ravenna	28	(1)
2024–	AEK	52	(1)

International career^{‡}
2011–2012	Greece U17	6	(0)
2013–2014	Greece U19	9	(1)
2016–	Greece	38	(0)
- * Club domestic league appearances and goals as of 4 June 2026 ‡ National team caps and goals as of 4 June 2025

Tatiana Georgiou (Greek: Τατιάνα Γεωργίου; born 4 January 1996) is a Greek footballer who plays as a midfielder for AEK and has appeared for the Greece women's national team.

== Career ==
She was born on 4 January 1996. Coming from Karteri, a village in Thesprotia, she grew up in Igoumenitsa where she took her first steps in football. She initially joined the boys' academies of Thesprotos. In 2008, she continued her career at Amazones Thesprotia, while still playing for Thesprotos and, in 2014, took the first big step, as she moved to Thessaloniki to wear the shirt of the Greek Champions, PAOK. After five years, in the summer of 2019, she made the second leap in her career and moved to Italy, where she played for Napoli in the Serie A. In 2021, she moved to Cesena in the Serie B and, in the summer of 2022, to Slovenia and Olimpija Ljubljana, where she still plays to this day. She is one of the key players of the women's national team, appearing for Greece during the 2019 FIFA Women's World Cup qualification.

== Honours ==
PAOK

- Greek A Division (5): 2014–15, 2015–16, 2016–17, 2017–18, 2018–19
- Greek Cup (3): 2014–15, 2015–16, 2017

Napoli

- Serie B (1): 2019–20

AEK

- Greek A Division (1): 2024–25
- Greek Cup (1): 2025
