= Dimitra Proxenou =

Greek footballer

Personal information
- Date of birth: 27 August 2001 (age 25)
- Place of birth: Peraia, Thessaloniki, Greece
- Position: Right back

Team information
- Current team: Asteras Tripolis F.C.
- Number: 18

Youth career
- 2012–2019: PAOK

Senior career*
Years	Team	Apps	(Gls)
2019–2020	Leontes Thessalonikis	3	(8)
2020–2022	Aris Thessalonikis		
2022–2023	Lakatamia	20	(8)
2023–2024	Kastoria		
2024–2026	Asteras Tripolis	43	(9)
2026–	AEK		

International career^{‡}
2018–2019	Greece U19	11	(2)
2024–	Greece	2	(0)
- * Club domestic league appearances and goals as of 16 July 2026 ‡ National team caps and goals as of 6 August 2025

Dimitra Proxenou (Greek: Δήμητρα Προξένου; born 27 August 2001) is a Greek professional footballer who plays as a defender for Greek club AEK and the Greek national team.

== Club career ==
At the age of 11, Dimitra Proxenou joined the academy of PAOK until she was 18 years old. After having difficulty breaking into the senior team, she decided to sign for third division club Leontes Thessalonikis in 2019. She was a key player in their promotion to the second division and finished as the top scorer of the group with 8 goals. The following season she returned to the top flight with Aris Thessalonikis where she played for two seasons. On 30 June 2022, she transferred to Cypriot club Lakatamia where she made 21 appearances and scored 8 goals. On 23 May 2023, she moved back to Greece to play for Kastoria GPO. On 9 August 2024, Proxenou transferred to Asteras Tripolis. In her first season, she scored seven goals in 21 appearances in the league. The following season, she was moved to the right-back position from where she made 28 total appearances and scored twice as her club finished third in the league and reached the final of the 2025–26 Greek Cup. On 15 July 2026, she signed for AEK.

== Honours ==
Leontes Thessalonikis

- Gamma Ethniki: 2019–20

Asteras Tripolis

- Greek Cup; runner-up: 2025–26
