= Sofía Álvarez (footballer) =

Mexican footballer (born 2000)

Personal information
- Full name: Sofía Álvarez Tostado Macín
- Date of birth: 5 June 2000 (age 26)
- Place of birth: Tequisquiapan, Querétaro, Mexico
- Height: 1.55 m (5 ft 1 in)
- Position: Defender

Team information
- Current team: AEK Athens
- Number: 16

Senior career*
Years	Team	Apps	(Gls)
2018–2022	Quéretaro	101	(8)
2022	Valencia	3	(0)
2023–2024	Beşiktaş J.K.	24	(1)
2024–	AEK Athens	19	(3)
- * Club domestic league appearances and goals as of 6 June 2025

Sofía Álvarez Tostado Macín (born 5 June 2000) is a Mexican footballer who plays as a defender for AEK Athens.

== Early life ==
Álvarez focused on ballet dancing before focusing on playing football at the age of four.

== Club career ==
=== Youth ===
As a youth player, Álvarez joined the youth academy of Tuzos del Pachuca.

=== Senior ===
Álvarez started her career with Mexican side Querétaro. She established herself as a prominent part of the team, making 104 appearances and scoring eight goals. In 2022, she signed for Spanish side Valencia, but failed to establish herself as an important player there before signing for Turkish side Beşiktaş, where she experienced the 2023 Turkey–Syria earthquakes. As a result, she became the fifth Mexican women's player to ever sign for a foreign team.

== International career ==
Álvarez has represented Mexico internationally at youth level and has been regarded as one of the best prospects of her generation.

== Style of play ==
Álvarez mainly operates as a defender.

== Honours ==
AEK

- Greek A Division: 2024/25
- Greek Cup: 2025
