= Eirini Nefrou =

Greek footballer

Personal information
- Date of birth: 13 May 1994 (age 32)
- Place of birth: Nafplio, Greece
- Position: Defender

Team information
- Current team: Feidon Argous

Youth career
- 1999-2010: Akadimia 98 Nafpliou

College career
Years	Team	Apps	(Gls)
2015-2017	Holy Family University		

Senior career*
Years	Team	Apps	(Gls)
2010-2012	Toxotis Nafpliou		
2012-2015	Ikaros Petrotou		
2017-2020	PAOK	42	(1)
2020	Diósgyőri	6	(0)
2020-2021	PAOK	3	(0)
2021-2022	Pink Bari		
2022	Ternana	7	(1)
2023	Ergotelis	15	(2)
2023–2025	Panathinaikos	27	(2)
2025	AEK Athens	20	(1)
2026–	Feidon Argous	7	(1)

International career^{‡}
2019–	Greece	11	(0)
- * Club domestic league appearances and goals as of 18 May 2026 ‡ National team caps and goals as of 9 December 2023

Eirini Nefrou (Greek: Ειρήνη Νεφρού; born 13 May 1994) is a Greek footballer who plays as a defender for Greek B Division club Feidon Argous and the Greece women's national team.

== Club career ==
Nefrou has played for PAOK in Greece at the UEFA Women's Champions League.

== International career ==
Nefrou capped for Greece at senior level during the UEFA Women's Euro 2022 qualifying.

== Honours ==
Ikaros Petrotou

- Greek C Division (1): 2012/13
- Greek B Division (1): 2013/14

PAOK

- Greek A Division (3): 2017/18, 2018/19, 2020/21

AEK

- Greek A Division (1): 2024/25
- Greek Cup (1): 2025
