= 2025 Greek Women's Cup =

Κύπελλο Ελλάδας Γυναικών

Tournament details
- Country: Greece
- Dates: 12 February – 24 May 2025
- Teams: 28

Final positions
- Champions: AEK (1st title)
- Runners-up: Panathinaikos

Tournament statistics
- Matches played: 29
- Goals scored: 87 (3 per match)
- Top goal scorer(s): Eleni Stefatou; Sofia Iliadi; Aqsa Mushtaq; Eleonora Kougiou (3 goals)

The 2025 Greek Women's Cup is the 10th edition of the Greek women's association football national cup organized by the Hellenic Football Federation (HFF). PAOK were the defending champions.

AEK Athens won their first cup title and completed a domestic double.

== Schedule and format ==
For the 2025 edition of the tournament, participation is mandatory for all top division clubs and optional for the rest.

In the first phase, teams from the second and third division will be split into eight (8) groups. The division of the teams into groups will take place based on geographical criteria, with exceptions for island clubs.

All ties are played in a single-match decider at the home ground of the lower division opponent. If both sides belong to the same tier, the team that was guest in previous round will be the host or a draw will be held.

Round	Draw date	Match date	Fixtures	Clubs	Divisions entering this round
First round	23 January	12 February–1 March	9	17 → 8	9 B Division teams 8 C Division teams
Second round	23 January	12–18 March	4	8 → 4	None
Third round	17 March	26–29 March	7	14 → 7	10 A Division teams
Quarter-finals	1 April	16–30 April	4	8 → 4	1 A Division team
Semi-finals	25 April	7–14 May	4	4 → 2	None
Final	25 April	24 May	1	2 → 1	None

== Preliminary round ==
During the draw that took place on 23 January 2025, Elpides Irodotou and Nees Ergoteli from Group 8 were picked to play a preliminary match. The winner will then compete against Poseidon Kamisianon-Rapanion for qualification to the second round.

23 February 2025	Elpides Irodotou	0–0 (2–4 p)	Nees Ergoteli	Heraklion
12:00				Stadium: Giannis Skourelos Stadium

== First round ==
The draw was completed by the HFF on 23 January 2025, at the federation's headquarters in Goudi, Athens.

12 February 2025	Orestis Orestiadas	1–5	Pontiakos Alexandroupolis	Nea Vyssa
15:00	Zikidi		Marasli; Karakatsani; Konstantaki	Stadium: Municipal Stadium of Nea Vyssa; Referee: Anastasios Filippidis (Evros)

12 February 2025	PAS Giannina	0–2	Giannena	Ioannina
15:00			Farmaki 17'; Varsani 61'	Stadium: Gipedo Epirus FCA; Referee: Katerina Kyriazi (Epirus)

12 February 2025	Stavros Kalithion	1–3	Trianton Ialysou	Kalythies
15:00	Vogiatzi 59'		Ogutmen 6'; Kougiou 31'; Koufalli 48'	Stadium: Municipal Stadium of Kalythies; Referee: Alexandros Avgenikou (Dodecanese)

12 February 2025	Vasilissa Thrakis	0–3	Aris Thessalonikis	Feloni, Xanthi
15:30			Iliadi; Kotta	Stadium: Feloni Sports Center; Referee: Paschalis Grigoroudis (Thrace)

20 February 2025	Mykonos	2–0	Nereids Phthias	Ano Mera, Mykonos
14:30	Preka 27'; Ntokou 65'			Stadium: Gipedo Ano Meras; Referee: Ioannis Roussos (Cyclades)

26 February 2025	Odysseas Moschatou	0–0 (3–5 p)	Acharnaikos	Moschato
18:00				Stadium: Municipal Stadium of Moschato

28 February 2025	Diagoras Rachon	1–2	Sappho	Evdilos
12:00	Katechi		Vogiatzi 2'; Somaraki	Stadium: Dimotiko Gipedo Eudilou

1 March 2025	Poseidon Kamisianon-Rapanion	0–3	Nees Ergoteli	Kolymvari
15:30			Dettoraki; Kekeri; Trivyzaki	Stadium: Gipedo Kolympariou

== Second round ==
The draw was completed by the HFF on 23 January 2025, at the federation's headquarters in Goudi, Athens.

12 March 2025	Giannena	0–3	Acharnaikos	Ioannina
15:00			Tsimpoukaki 7'; Vasilakopoulou 76'; Harris 90+1'	Stadium: Epirus Sport & Health Center; Referee: Panagiotis Tsioris (Arta)

12 March 2025	Nees Ergoteli	3–4	Trianton Ialysou	Heraklion
16:00	Tougli 23'; Asimoni 45+' (pen.); Kekeri 57'		Kougiou 28', 63' (pen.); Ogutmen 32'; Svinou 90+3'	Stadium: Nikos Kazantzakis Stadium; Referee: Konstantinos Kalyvianakis (Rethymno)

12 March 2025	Pontiakos Alexandroupolis	0–3	Aris Thessalonikis	Alexandroupolis
16:30			Kokoviadou; Savvidou; Iliadi	Stadium: Gipedo Palagias; Referee: Georgios Drosinis (Thrace)

18 March 2025	Mykonos	1–0	Sappho	Ano Mera, Mykonos
13:30	Adam 90'			Stadium: Gipedo Ano Meras

== Third round ==
The draw was completed by the HFF on 17 March 2025, at the federation's headquarters in Goudi, Athens.

26 March 2025	Trianton Ialysou	0–8	OFI	Theologos, Rhodes
14:30		Report	Kydonaki 22'; Efih 37'; Fourlas 45', 67'; Mushtaq 60' (pen.), 68', 77' (pen.); Rybanská 69'	Stadium: Theologos Municipal Stadium; Referee: Grigorios Rigopoulos (Ilia)

26 March 2025	Nees Atromitou	1–0	Kastoria	Peristeri
15:00	Đorđević 75'	Report		Stadium: Chorafa Municipal Stadium; Referee: Alexios Stathopoulos (Athens)

26 March 2025	Aris Thessalonikis	0–4	Panathinaikos	Evosmos
15:00		Report	Dimitriou 17'; Douli 68'; Spyridonidou 79'; Kollia 90'	Stadium: Evosmos Municipal Stadium; Referee: Alexandra Deligianni (Larissa)

27 March 2025	Asteras Tripolis	3–1	Trikala 2011	Tripoli
12:00	Goula 11'; Kanellou 78', 84' (pen.)	Report	Kechagia 73'	Stadium: Filika Municipal Stadium; Referee: Stavroula Lampropoulou (Piraeus)

28 March 2025	REA	2–0	Agia Paraskevi	Rethymno
15:00	Basouri 5'; Yosue 65' (pen.)	Report		Stadium: Sochora Municipal Stadium; Referee: Dimitrios Antoniou (Chania)

29 March 2025	Mykonos	0–5	PAOK	Ano Mera, Mykonos
12:00		Report	Koskeridou 1'; Estévez 23'; Papadopoulou 30'; Doiranli 47'; Drakogiannaki 74'	Stadium: Ano Mera Municipal Stadium; Referee: Efthymios Koktsidis (Cyclades)

29 March 2025	Acharnaikos	1–1 (5–3 p)	Kifisia	Nea Makri
15:00	Xera 68'	Report	Savvopoulou 45'	Stadium: Nea Makri Municipal Stadium; Referee: Anargyros Katsinis (East Attica)

== Quarter-finals ==
The draw was completed by the HFF on 1 April 2025, at the federation's headquarters in Goudi, Athens.

16 April 2025	Acharnaikos	0–3	Panathinaikos	Nea Makri
18:00		Report	Ntarzanou 19'; Brame 33'; Spyridonidou 47'	Stadium: Nea Makri Municipal Stadium; Referee: Vasilios Lamprou (West Attica)

16 April 2025	REA	2–1 (a.e.t.)	OFI	Rethymno
16:00	Kotsaki 61': Situma 102'	Report	Rybanská 73'	Stadium: Sochora Municipal Stadium; Referee: Georgios Koukourakis (Chania)

30 April 2025	Asteras Tripolis	0–3	PAOK	Tripoli
13:00		Report	Gkouni 17'; Manisha 58'; Tzourtzevits 77'	Stadium: Theodoros Kolokotronis Stadium

16 April 2025	Nees Atromitou	0–4	AEK	Peristeri
16:00		Report	Stefatou 11', 32', 75'; Zagkli 73'	Stadium: Chorafa Municipal Stadium; Referee: Petros Lempesis (Piraeus)

== Semi-finals ==
The draw was completed by the HFF on 25 April 2025, at the federation's headquarters in Goudi, Athens.

=== Summary ===
The first legs will be played on 7 May, and the second legs on 14 May 2025.

Semi-finals
Team 1	Agg.	Team 2	1st leg	2nd leg
Panathinaikos	2–1	PAOK	1–1	1–0 (a.e.t.)
REA	2–4	AEK	1–3	1–1

=== Matches ===
7 May 2025
15:00

Panathinaikos	1–1	PAOK
Gkatsou 62'	Report	Papadopoulou 15'

Georgios Kalafatis Sports Center, Koropi, East Attica
Referee: Fotis Daoulas (West Attica)
14 May 2025
15:00

PAOK	0–1 (a.e.t.)	Panathinaikos
	Report	Olszewska 110'

Toumba Stadium, Thessaloniki
Referee: Andromachi Tsiofliki (Larissa)

Panathinaikos won 2–1 on aggregate.

7 May 2025
17:00

REA	1–3	AEK
Kotsaki 49'	Report	Manoukaraki 19' (o.g.); Koggouli 79'; Kapnisi 90' (pen.)

Sochora Municipal Stadium, Rethymno
Referee: Dimitrios Moschou (Lasithi)
14 May 2025
16:00

AEK	1–1	REA
Tzoutzouraki 77'	Report	Basouri 1'

Agioi Anargyroi Municipal Stadium, Athens
Referee: Georgios Takidis (West Attica)

AEK won 4–2 on aggregate.

== Final ==
The final will be played on 24 May 2025 at the Panthessaliko Stadium in Volos. The match took place behind closed doors due to safety concerns.

24 May 2025
16:30 EEST

AEK	2–0	Panathinaikos
Violari 31'; Veniamin 90+6'	Report

Panthessaliko Stadium, Volos
Referee: Eleni Antoniou (Achaea)

GK	1	(Greece) Dimitra Giannakouli
CB	3	(Greece) Sofia Zagkli
CB	5	(Greece) Maria Kapnisi
CB	4	(Greece) Georgia Pavlopoulou
RM	16	(Mexico) Sofía Álvarez (substituted off) 77'
DM	6	(Greece) Tatiana Georgiou
LM	2	(Greece) Eirini Nefrou
CM	7	(Cyprus) Maria Panagiotou (substituted off) 90'
CM	8	(Greece) Eleni Stefatou (c) (substituted off) 77'
CF	10	(Greece) Sophia Koggouli (substituted off) 90+4'
CF	19	(Cyprus) Antri Violari (substituted off) 90'
Substitutes:
GK	15	(Albania) Aleksandra Kocibelli
DF	9	(Greece) Pelagia Bartzakli
DF	11	(Greece) Stefania Stergiouli
FW	12	(Greece) Nagia Veniamin (substituted on) 90+4'
MF	13	(Colombia) Maireth Pérez (substituted on) 77'
DF	14	(Greece) Eleni Tselenti (substituted on) 90'
MF	17	(Greece) Eleni Kakambouki (substituted on) 90'
MF	18	(Greece) Pigi Lompotesi
MF	20	(Greece) Voula Tzoutzouraki (substituted on) 77'
Manager:
(Greece) Nikos Kotsovos

GK	1	(Greece) Zoi Nasi
RB	2	(Greece) Matina Ntarzanou
CB	18	(Greece) Anastasia Gkatsou
CB	19	(Poland) Joanna Olszewska
LB	16	(Poland) Oliwia Rapacka (substituted off) 86'
DM	7	(Greece) Christina Kollia
DM	8	(Greece) Efi Brame
RM	17	(Greece) Ioanna Chamalidou
CM	20	(Greece) Marianna Katopodi (substituted off) 74'
LM	9	(Greece) Grigoria Pouliou
CF	11	(Greece) Anastasia Spyridonidou (c)
Substitutes:
GK	3	(Greece) Fani Kostopoulou
GK	12	(Greece) Panagiota Chatzicharistou
MF	4	(Greece) Maria Douli
MF	5	(Greece) Konstantina Kostopoulou
DF	6	(Greece) Isis Skarlatidi
MF	10	(United States) Fiona Doherty (substituted on) 86'
DF	13	(Greece) Chara Dimitriou (substituted on) 74'
MF	14	(Greece) Natalia Konstantinidi
MF	15	(Greece) Eleftheria Moraitou
Manager:
(Serbia) Dragan Knežević

Assistant referees:
Georgia Komisopoulou (Chania)
Zoi Papadopoulou (Macedonia)
Fourth official:
Alexandra Deligianni (Larissa)
Reserve assistant referee:
Eleni Kyriou (Arcadia)

== Top goalscorers ==
As of 24 May 2025

Rank	Player	Club	Goals
1	(Greece) Eleni Stefatou	AEK	3
1	(Greece) Sofia Iliadi	Aris Thessalonikis	3
1	(Pakistan) Aqsa Mushtaq	OFI	3
1	(Greece) Eleonora Kougiou	Trianton Ialysou	3
2	(Greece) Christina Kanellou	Asteras Tripolis	2
2	(Greece) Faih Kekeri	Nees Ergoteli	2
2	(Canada) Athena Fourlas	OFI	2
2	(Slovakia) Nikola Rybanská	OFI	2
2	(Greece) Anastasia Spyridonidou	Panathinaikos	2
2	(Greece) Antigoni Papadopoulou	PAOK	2
2	(Greece) Panagiota Marasli	Pontiakos	2
2	(Greece) Christina Karakatsani	Pontiakos	2
2	(Greece) Stela Kotsaki	REA	2
2	(Greece) Maria Basouri	REA	2
2	(Greece) Evangelia Ogutmen	Trianton Ialysou	2
