= Chara Dimitriou =

Greek footballer

Personal information
- Date of birth: 12 April 1990 (age 36)
- Place of birth: Potamia, Thesprotia, Greece
- Position: Midfielder

Senior career*
Years	Team	Apps	(Gls)
2007–2009	Volos 2004		
2009–2016	PAOK		
2016–2017	VfL Sindelfingen	21	(2)
2017–2019	BV Cloppenburg	48	(5)
2019–2021	PAOK		
2021–2025	Panathinaikos	62	(16)
2025–2026	Kifisia	7	(0)

International career^{‡}
2008	Greece U19		
2009–2024	Greece	38	(0)
- * Club domestic league appearances and goals as of 30 June 2026 ‡ National team caps and goals as of 10 November 2024

Chara Dimitriou (born 12 April 1990) is a Greek former footballer who played as a midfielder and has appeared for the Greece women's national team.

== Career ==
Dimitriou has been capped for the Greece national team, appearing for the team during the 2019 FIFA Women's World Cup qualifying cycle.

== Honours ==
Volos 2004

- Greek A Division; runner-up: 2008–09

PAOK

- Greek A Division (8): 2009–10, 2010–11, 2011–12, 2012–13, 2014–15, 2015–16, 2019–20, 2020–21
- Greek Cup (4): 2012–13, 2013–14, 2014–15, 2015–16

Panathinaikos

- Greek A Division; runner-up: 2024–25
- Greek B Division (1): 2022–23
- Gamma Ethniki (1): 2021–22
- Greek Cup; runner-up: 2025
