= Vasiliki Moskofidou =

Greek footballer

Personal information
- Full name: Vasiliki Moskofidou
- Date of birth: 22 June 1991 (age 35)
- Place of birth: Greece
- Position: Attacking midfielder

Team information
- Current team: Marko WFC

Senior career*
Years	Team	Apps	(Gls)
2007–2008	Asteras Magoula	12	(21)
2008–2009	Kallithea	18	(11)
2009–2014	Odysseas Glyfadas	90	(56)
2014–2015	Amazones Dramas	18	(7)
- Ammochostos
2021–2022	AEK	8	(26)
2022–2023	Atromitos	14	(22)
2023–2024	Asteras Tripolis	26	(16)
2024	REA	5	(2)
2025	PAOK	9	(3)
2025–2026	Volos	22	(6)
2026–	Marko	1	(5)

International career^{‡}
2008–2010	Greece U19	5	(1)
2011–	Greece	27	(7)
- * Club domestic league appearances and goals as of 22 October 2026 ‡ National team caps and goals as of 9 February 2025

Vasiliki "Vaso" Moskofidou is a Greek women's football striker currently playing for Marko WFC in the Gamma Ethniki.

She is a member of the Greek national team since 2008. In March 2012, she scored her first goal against Poland.

== International goals ==
No.	Date	Venue	Opponent	Score	Result	Competition
1.	31 March 2012	Nea Smyrni Stadium, Athens, Greece	Poland	1–1	1–1	UEFA Women's Euro 2013 qualifying
2.	4 April 2012	Nea Smyrni Stadium, Athens, Greece	North Macedonia	2–2	2–2	UEFA Women's Euro 2013 qualifying
3.	12 March 2014	Glyfada Municipal Stadium, Athens, Greece	Cyprus	3–0	3–0	Friendly
4.	12 March 2015	Peyia Municipal Stadium, Pegeia, Cyprus	Lebanon		14–0	Aphrodite Women Cup
5.	12 March 2015	Peyia Municipal Stadium, Pegeia, Cyprus	Lebanon		14–0	Aphrodite Women Cup
6.	12 March 2015	Peyia Municipal Stadium, Pegeia, Cyprus	Lebanon		14–0	Aphrodite Women Cup
7.	13 March 2015	Peyia Municipal Stadium, Pegeia, Cyprus	United Arab Emirates	1–0	7–0	Aphrodite Women Cup

== Honours ==
Asteras Magoula

- Greek B Division: 2007–08

Amazones Dramas

- Greek A Division; runner-up: 2014–15

AEK

- Gamma Ethniki: 2021–22
