= Manyima Stevelmans =

Gambian footballer (born 2000)

Personal information
- Date of birth: 31 October 2000 (age 25)
- Place of birth: Brufut, Gambia
- Height: 1.63 m (5 ft 4 in)
- Position: Midfielder

Team information
- Current team: AEK Athens F.C.
- Number: 45

Youth career
- BSV Limburgia

College career
| Years | Team | Apps | (Gls) |
| 2019–2020 | Navarro Bulldogs | | |

Senior career*
| Years | Team | Apps | (Gls) |
| 2020–2021 | Genk | 3 | (0) |
| 2021–2022 | Charleroi | 21 | (0) |
| 2022–2023 | FH | | |
| 2023 | Sion | 4 | (0) |
| 2023–2024 | ALG Spor | 20 | (0) |
| 2024–2025 | Riga | 27 | (10) |
| 2026– | AEK | 7 | (0) |

International career
| 2023– | Gambia | | |
- * Club domestic league appearances and goals as of 4 June 2026

Manyima Stevelmans (born 31 October 2000) is a Gambian midfielder who plays football for AEK Athens in the Greek A Division.

After starting her career in the Netherlands, Stevelmans moved to the USA. Upon her return to Europe, she played for multiple teams before joining Riga FC. She was awarded the Best Latvian Women's League Player of The Year for the 2023/24 season by the Latvian Football Federation.

== Early life ==
Stevelmans was born on 31 October 2000 in Brufut, Gambia. When she was six, she was adopted by Ilona and Danny Stevelmans and raised in Brunssum, the Netherlands.

== Education ==
Stevelmans attended Navarro College in the United States as a freshman.

== Club career ==
Stevelmans played for Icelandic side FH, helping the club win the league.

== International career ==
In 2023, Stevelmans was called up to the Gambia women's national football team for the 2024 Women's Africa Cup of Nations qualification.

== Style of play ==
Stevelmans has been described as a "versatile player who is mainly active in midfield".

== Personal life ==
Stevelmans has a brother and a sister.

== Honours ==
FH

- 1. deild kvenna: 2022

Riga

- Latvian League: 2024, 2025
- Latvian Cup: 2025
- Baltic Football League: 2025
