= AEK Athens F.C. (women) =

Greek women's football club (e. 2021)

AEK Athens
- Full name: Αθλητική Ένωσις Κωνσταντινουπόλεως; Athlitikí Énosis Konstantinoupόleos (Athletic Union of Constantinople)
- Nicknames: Vasílissa (Queen); Énosis (Union); Kitrinómavroi (The Yellow-Blacks); Dikéfalos Aetós (Two-Headed Eagle)
- Founded: 5 July 2021; 5 years ago
- Ground: Agioi Anargyroi Stadium
- Chairman: Alexis Alexiou
- Manager: Stelios Kozanidis
- League: Greek A Division
- 2025–26: Greek A Division, 2nd
- Website: aek.gr
Home colours	Away colours

AEK Athens Women's Football Club (Greek: ΠΑΕ A.E.K. [aek]; Αθλητική Ένωσις Κωνσταντινουπόλεως; Athlitiki Enosis Konstantinoupoleos, meaning Athletic Union of Constantinople), commonly referred to as AEK, is the Greek women's association football department of AEK sports club and competes in the Greek A Division.

== History ==
The AEK women's football team was established in July 2021, marking a significant development in the promotion of women's sports within the organization. In the course of the 2021–22 season, the team took part in the Greek C Division, successfully concluding their campaign by remaining undefeated and securing the top position in their group. In a remarkable display of skill, Vasiliki Moskofidou, a Greek international player, topped the league's scoring charts with a noteworthy 26 goals after participating in only 8 games. As the season wrapped up, Christos Christopoulos shifted from his managerial position at AEK to become the technical director, while Nikos Gkalitsios was named the head coach.

In the 2022–23 season, they took part in the Greek B Division, where they once more achieved an impressive feat by finishing at the top of their group without suffering any defeats. That season, AEK showcased the finest defensive strategy in the league, as they remarkably permitted just two goals to be scored against them. The team's leading goal scorers were Eirini Vasilakopoulou and Antonia Nika, who both achieved an outstanding tally of 15 goals.

The 2023–24 football season marked their inaugural year competing at the highest level. AEK made strategic changes to their squad over the summer, signing Greek national team members Panagiota Chatzicharistou, Maria Kapnisi, and Despoina Chatzinikolaou, as well as adding Colombian players Tatiana Vera from CD Parquesol, Vennus Pineda from La Equidad, and Yulie Lopez from América de Cali. On December 17, 2023, after a draw with Trikala, the club made the decision to part ways with manager Nikos Gkalitsios, subsequently appointing Nikos Kotsovos as his successor. Under the guidance of the new manager, the club achieved a sixth-place finish, recording a total of 9 victories, 9 draws, and 8 losses throughout the season. In their very first participation in the 2024 Greek Cup, they reached the final, showcasing their talent; however, they were ultimately defeated in a penalty shootout by the defending champions, PAOK. Despoina Chatzinikolaou emerged as the leading scorer in the competition, netting an impressive total of six goals.

In the 2024–25 football season, the club achieved a remarkable milestone by winning both the league and cup competitions, thereby securing their inaugural qualification for the UEFA Women's Champions League. To enhance their opportunities in the first qualifying round of the 2025–26 UEFA Women's Champions League against Racing Union, AEK successfully signed several players during the summer transfer period, among whom are Gabrielle Vivier-Hannay and Astrid Larsson. In its debut match, AEK, successfully reached a 3–3 draw within regular time; nevertheless, the players were unable to maintain their momentum and lost 3–5 once extra time concluded. On August 2, 2025, AEK achieved a significant milestone by securing their inaugural international victory against FC Flora during the third-place match of the 2025–26 UEFA Women's Champions League first qualifying round.

== Honours ==
AEK W.F.C. honours aek.gr
Type	Competition	Titles	Seasons	Runners-up	Ref.
Domestic	A Division	1	2024–25	2025–26	
Domestic	B Division	1	2022–23		
Domestic	Gamma Ethniki	1	2021–22		
Domestic	Greek Cup	1	2025	2024	

- Record
- ^{S} Shared record

=== Doubles ===
- Winners (1): 2024–25

== Season to season ==
Season	League									Cup	UWCL	Top scorer	
Season	Div	Pos	Pld	W	D	L	GF	GA	Pts	Cup	UWCL	Name(s)	Goal
2021–22	C	1st (Gr:V)	8	8	0	0	66	1	24		—	(Greece) Vasiliki Moskofidou	26
2022–23	B	1st (Gr:III)	16	14	2	0	101	2	44		—	(Greece) Eirini Vasilakopoulou (Greece) Antonia Nika	15
2023–24	A	6th	26	9	9	8	28	17	36	Runner–up	—	(Greece) Despoina Chatzinikolaou	6
2024–25	A	1st	22	19	2	1	67	10	59	Winner	—	(Greece) Sophia Koggouli	16
2025–26	A	2nd	26	20	4	2	69	17	64	Semifinals	Round 1	(Cyprus) Antri Violari	20

== European performance ==
=== Match table ===
Season	Competition	Round	Opponent	Home	Away	Agg.	Qual.	Ref.
2025–26	UEFA Women's Champions League	Round 1 SF	(Luxembourg) Racing Union	–	5–3 (a.e.t.)	3–5		
2025–26	UEFA Women's Champions League	Round 1 CF	(Estonia) FC Flora	–	0–1	1–0		

=== Overall record ===
Competition	Home								Away								Total							
Competition	Pld	W	D	L	GF	GA	GD	Win%	Pld	W	D	L	GF	GA	GD	Win%	Pld	W	D	L	GF	GA	GD	Win%
UEFA Women's Champions League	0	0	0	0	0	0	+0	—	2	1	0	1	4	5	−1	50.00	2	1	0	1	4	5	−1	50.00
Total	0	0	0	0	0	0	+0	—	2	1	0	1	4	5	−1	50.00	2	1	0	1	4	5	−1	50.00

Last updated: 2 August 2025
Source: uefa.com

=== Record by country of opposition ===
Country	Home							Away							Total							
Country	Pld	W	D	L	GF	GA	GD	Pld	W	D	L	GF	GA	GD	Pld	W	D	L	GF	GA	GD	Win%
Estonia	0	0	0	0	0	0	0	1	1	0	0	1	0	+1	1	1	0	0	1	0	+1	100.00
Luxemburg	0	0	0	0	0	0	0	1	0	0	1	3	5	-2	1	0	0	1	3	5	-2	00.00
Europe	0	0	0	0	0	0	0	2	1	0	1	4	5	-1	2	1	0	1	4	5	-1	50.00

Last updated: 2 August 2025
Source: uefa.com

- Last entry is the match against FC Flora for the 2025–26 UEFA Women's Champions League first qualifying round.
- The record after the last entry is 2 matches in total (1W, 0D, 1L, GF4, GA5), with 0 home matches (0W, 0D, 0L, GF0, GA0) and 2 away matches (1W, 0D, 1L, GF4, GA5).
- Single games are considered home or away according to the team's allocation after a UEFA competition draw.

== Players ==
=== Current squad ===
As of 20 September 2026

Note: Flags indicate national team as defined under FIFA eligibility rules; some limited exceptions apply. Players may hold more than one non-FIFA nationality.

No.	Pos.	Nation	Player
1	GK	GRE	Dimitra Giannakouli
2	MF	GRE	Pigi Lompotesi
3	MF	GRE	Sofia Zagkli
4	DF	GRE	Georgia Pavlopoulou
5	DF	GRE	Maria Kapnisi (captain)
6	DF	GRE	Tatiana Georgiou
7	FW	USA	Hannah Anselmo
8	MF	GRE	Eleni Stefatou (vice-captain)
9	FW	GRE	Despoina Chatzinikolaou (third-captain)
10	FW	GRE	Sofia Koggouli
11	MF	ESA	Makenna Domínguez
12	MF	GRE	Eleni Saich

No.	Pos.	Nation	Player
13	GK	GRE	Zoi Nasi
14	DF	GRE	Eleni Tselenti
16	DF	GRE	Dimitra Proxenou
17	MF	USA	Mallory McGuire
18	MF	GRE	Maria-Eleni Mougiou
19	FW	CYP	Antri Violari
20	MF	GRE	Voula Tzoutzouraki
21	FW	GRE	Pelagia Mpartzakli
22	DF	AUS	Ava Piazza
27	FW	IND	Manisha Kalyan
28	MF	COL	Liced Serna
33	FW	GRE	Anastasia Spyridonidou
50	DF	GRE	Aggeliki Koukoulaki

== Personnel ==
As of 23 July 2026

=== Current staff ===
Position	Name
Head coach	(Greece) Stelios Kozanidis
Assistant coach	(Greece) Dimitrios Anakoglou
Fitness coach	(Greece) Giorgos Pidoulas
Technical director	(Greece) Christos Christopoulos
Team manager	(Greece) Ilias Mourousias
Physiotherapist	(Greece) Emmanouil Stavrakakis

=== Managerial history ===
Name	Years	Trophies	Ref.
(Greece) Christos Christopoulos	2021–2022	2021–22 Gamma Ethniki	
(Greece) Nikos Gkalitsios	2022–2023	2022–23 Greek B Division	
(Greece) Nikos Kotsovos	2023–2026	2024–25 Greek A Division, 2025 Greek Cup	
(Greece) Thalis Theodoridis	2026		
(Greece) Stelios Kozanidis	2026–		

== List of former and current players ==
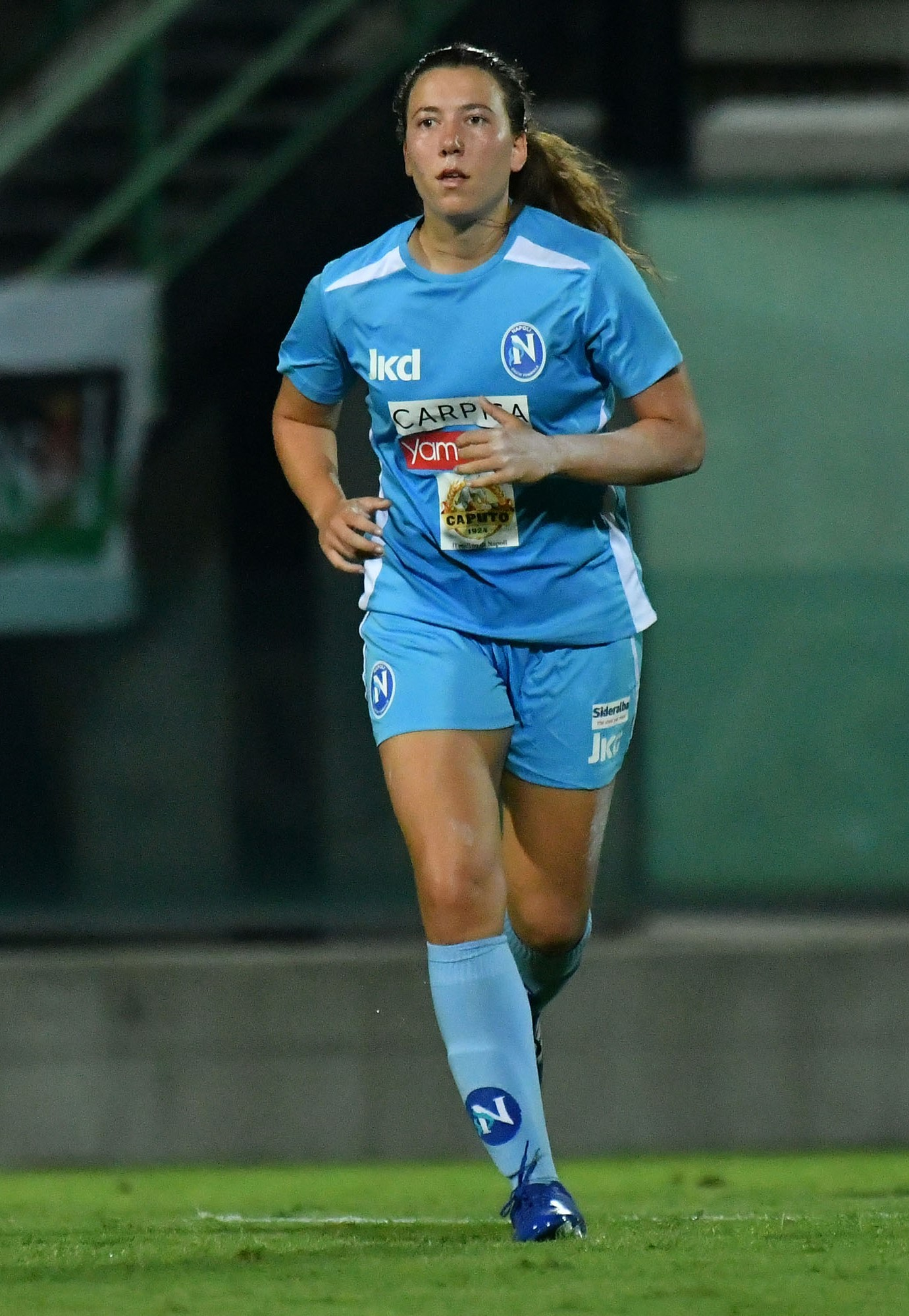
Despoina Chatzinikolaou

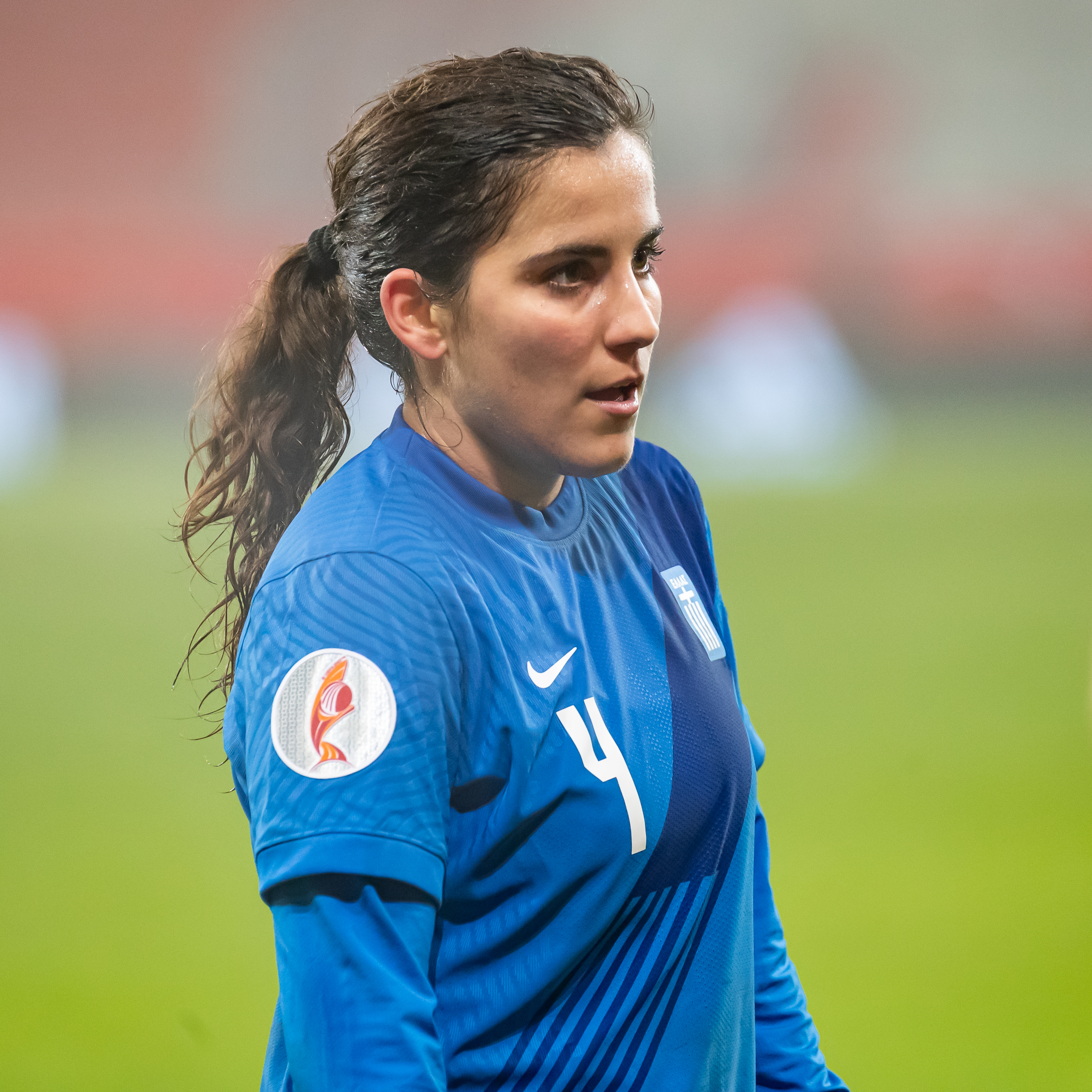
Tatiana Georgiou

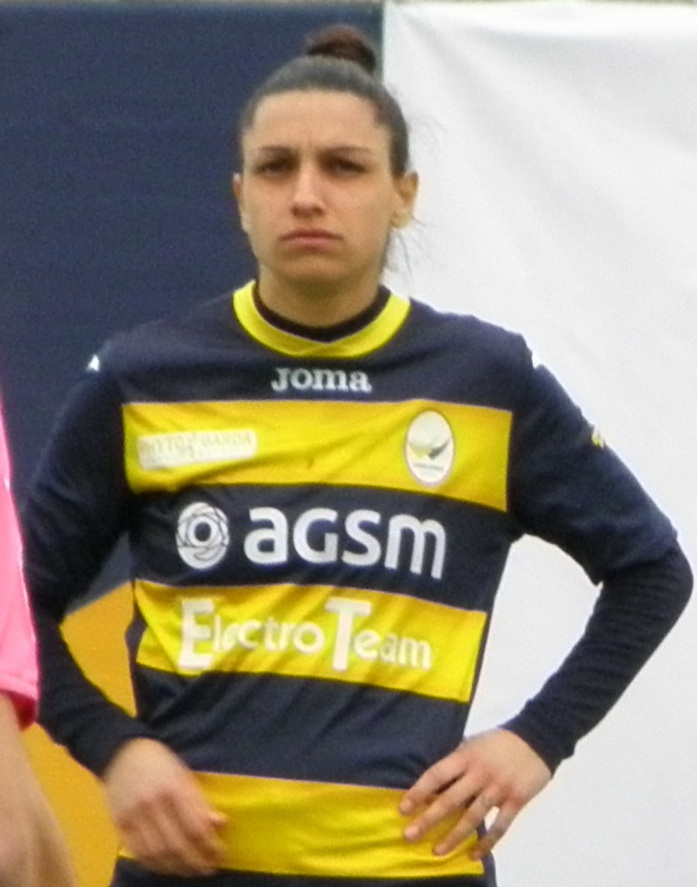
Sophia Koggouli

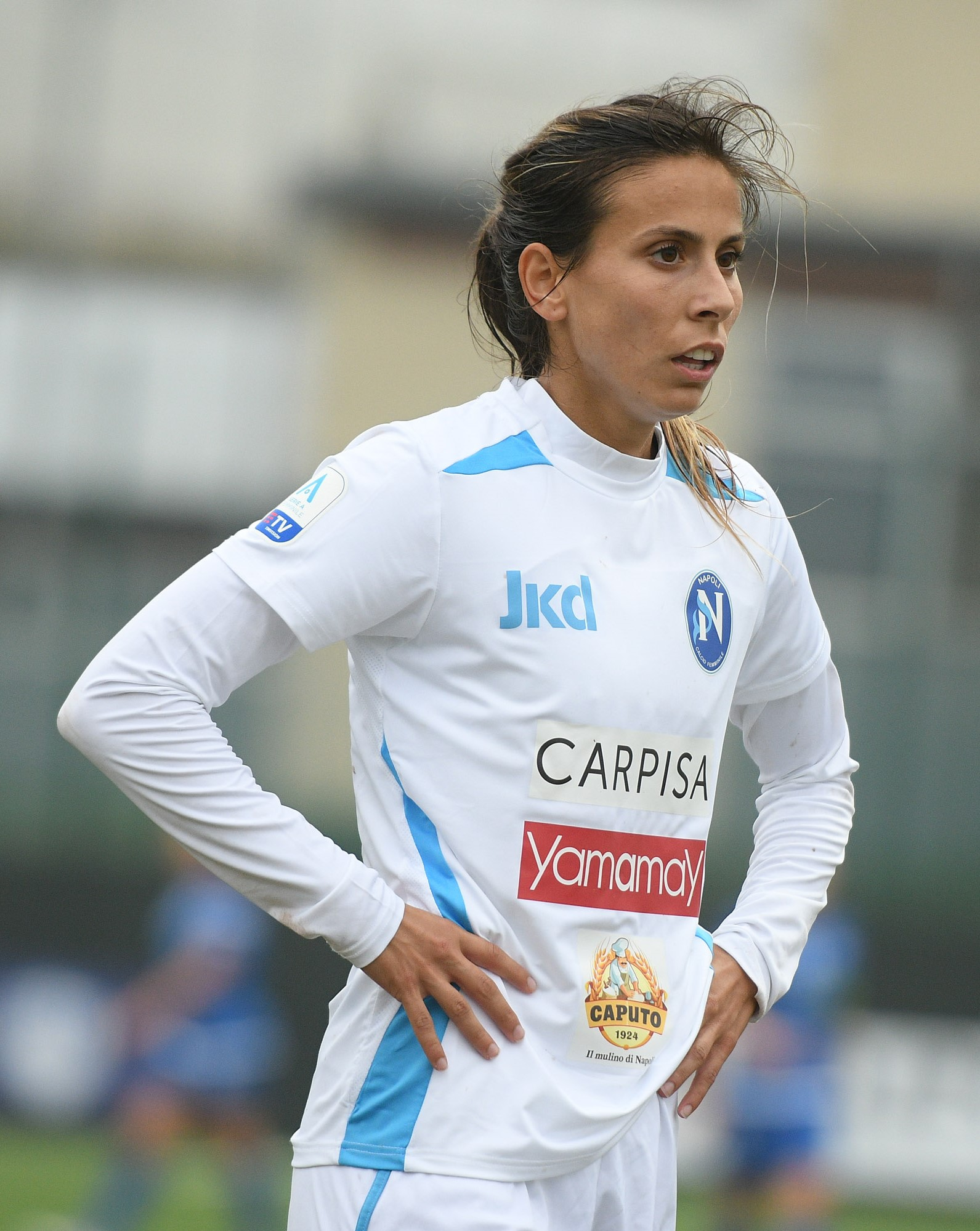
Evdokiya Popadinova

Greece

- (Greece) Vasiliki Moskofidou (2021–22)
- (Greece) Georgia Pavlopoulou (2022–)
- (Greece) Panagiota Chatzicharistou (2023–24)
- (Greece) Georgia Trivizaki (2023–24)
- (Greece) (Serbia) Mila Ivić (2023–24)
- (Greece) Maria Kapnisi (2023–)
- (Greece) Despoina Chatzinikolaou (2023–)
- (Greece) Christianna Kiamou (2024–25)
- (Greece) Sophia Koggouli (2024–)
- (Greece) Dimitra Giannakouli (2024–)
- (Greece) Tatiana Georgiou (2024–)
- (Greece) Eleni Kakambouki (2025)
- (Greece) Ioanna Chamalidou (2025–)
- (Greece) Eleni Saich (2025–)
- (Greece) Eirini Nefrou (2025)
- (Greece) Dimitra Proxenou (2026–)
- (Greece) Zoi Nasi (2026–)
- (Greece) Anastasia Spyridonidou (2026–)

Rest of Europe

- (Albania) (Greece) Aleksandra Kocibelli (2022–)
- (Bulgaria) (Greece) Alexandra Dimitrova (2024)
- (Bulgaria) Evdokiya Popadinova (2026)
- (Sweden) Astrid Wemö Larsson (2025–)

Africa

- (The Gambia) Manyima Stevelmans (2026–)
- (Ghana) Azumah Bugre (2026)

Americas

- (Canada) Gabrielle Vivier-Hannay (2025–)
- (Colombia) Tatiana Vera (2023–24)
- (Colombia) Vennus Pineda (2023–24)
- (Colombia) Yulie Lopez (2023–24)
- (Colombia) Maireth Pérez (2024–25)
- (Colombia) Liced Serna (2026–)
- (El Salvador) Makenna Dominguez (2026–)
- (Mexico) Sofía Álvarez (2024–25)
- (United States) Elizabeth Hill (2026–)
- (United States) Mallory McGuire (2026–)
- (United States) Hannah Anselmo (2026–)

Asia

- (Cyprus) Maria Panagiotou (2024–26)
- (Cyprus) Antri Violari (2024–)
- (India) Manisha Kalyan (2026–)

Oceania

- (Australia) Ava Piazza (2026–)

== Shirt sponsors and manufacturers ==
Kit manufacturer	Period	Shirt sponsor	Period
(United States) Capelli	2021–22	(Sweden) Betsson AB	2021–22
(Italy) Macron	2024–	(Greece) PhysiOsteoTeam (Greece) Seajets	2024–25; 2025–26
(United States) Nike	2026–	(Greece) Seajets	2026–
