= Athletic Union of Larissa =

Greek multi-sports club

AEL
- Full name: Αθλητική Ένωση Λάρισας (Athletic Union of Larissa)
- Nicknames: Queen of the Lowlands
- Founded: 1964; 62 years ago
- Colours: Maroon, White
- Anthem: Hymn of AEL
- Chairman: Nikos Kyriakou
- Club titles: 3: (2 Greek Cup, 1 Greek Championship)
- Website: e-ael.gr

Athlitiki Enosi Larissas (Greek: Αθλητική Ένωση Λάρισας, Athletic Union of Larissa), founded in 1964, is a major Greek multi-sports club based in the city of Larissa, capital of Greece's Thessaly region. The club is also known as AEL, or simply Larissa, and its colors are maroon or crimson and white.

== Departments ==
- Athlitiki Enosi Larissa F.C. - Football
- A.E.L. 1964 B.C. - Basketball
- Volleyball
- Rugby league
- Athletics

The football team currently competes in Super League Greece and the basketball team competed in the Greek A2 Basket League.

== Sport facilities ==
AEL FC Arena

The football team plays at the AEL FC Arena stadium, AEL's home since 2011 and one of the most modern football grounds in Greece. The club has also its own training facilities in the area of the village Dendra. The facilities cover over 30,000 square meters and have multisport purposes for all of the team's athletes.

A.E.L. 1964 B.C. hosts its home games in the Larissa Neapolis Arena.

== Notable supporters ==
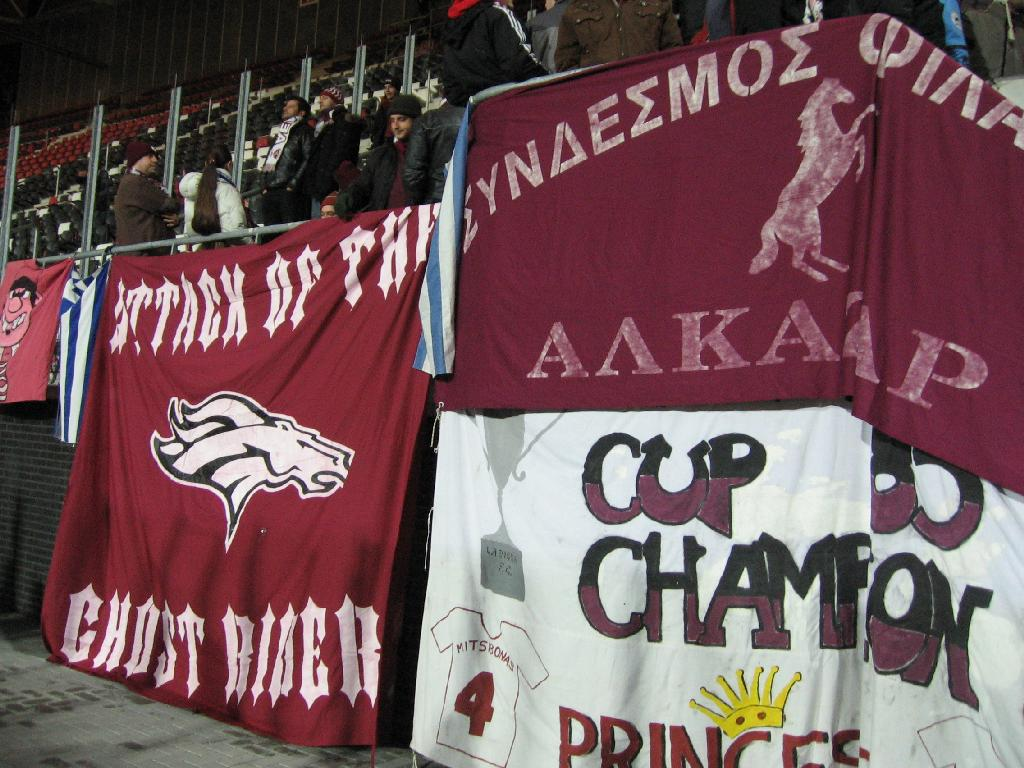
AEL fans in AFAS Stadion in a European game against AZ Alkmaar

- Kostas Agorastos, former MP
- Vangelis Kaounos, footballer, former AEL player
- Giannis Kalamaras, former ultras' chief
- Thomas Kyparissis, football player and coach, former AEL captain
- Vangelis Moras, footballer and coach, former AEL captain
- Filippos Pliatsikas, musician
- Nikos Sotiroulis, entrepreneur, former AEL FC owner
- Sakis Tsiolis, football player and coach, former AEL player, Greek champion
