= Agia Paraskevi W.F.C. =

Greek women's football club (e. 2009)

Agia Paraskevi
- Full name: Agia Paraskevi Women's Football Club
- Nickname: Santa
- Founded: 2009; 17 years ago
- Ground: Agia Paraskevi Stadium, Agia Paraskevi, Athens
- Manager: Dimitrios Kalykas
- League: Greek A Division
- 2024–25: A Division, 7th
- Website: http://santawfc.gr/

Agia Paraskevi (Greek: Αγία Παρασκευή), commonly referred to as Santa, is the Greek women's association football department of Agia Paraskevi F.C. and competes in the Greek A Division.

== History ==
The women’s football team of Agia Paraskevi was established in 2009 following initiatives by the club’s board to create a branch for the development of young female players. In its inaugural campaign, in 2010–11, the club finished second in the newly formed women’s third division and secured promotion after a playoff victory against AO Artas in Patras, winning 3–1.

In the 2011–12 season, Agia Paraskevi competed in the second division but was relegated after not registering a single win. Returning to the third division in 2012–13, the club finished second and, in 2013–14, it achieved its first league championship after defeating Olympiada Ymittou 2–0 in a promotion playoff. In 2014–15, the club finished second in the B Division and reached the second round of the Greek Cup where it was eliminated by Atromitos, while in 2015–16 it placed third in the league and was knocked out of the cup in the second round by Olympiada Ymittou. The 2016–17 season saw another second-place finish in the league, while Santa managed to reach the quarterfinals of the cup where they got eliminated by AO Trikala 2011. Vasiliki Petraki was the group's top scorer with 8 goals, while Sofia Parmaxi was the top scorer of the cup with 7 goals. Agia Paraskevi’s most notable success came in 2017–18, when the team won the B Division championship undefeated, with 13 wins and 1 draw in 14 matches, and earned promotion to the first division for the first time in its history. Vasiliki Petraki was the league's top scorer with 17 goals. The same year, the club was honored with the Fair Play Award at the 36th PSAPP Awards, after deliberately missing a wrongly awarded penalty in a league match against AO Chania.

In 2018–19, Agia Paraskevi competed in the Greek A Division. Despite competitive performances, the team was relegated back to the second division at the end of the season. In January 2019, Giannis Giannoglou, who had served as head coach since the club’s establishment, departed. He was briefly succeeded by Alexandros Skipos, who managed two matches before being replaced by Giannis Charalampidis. The following year, 2019–20, the club finished first in its group and secured an immediate promotion back to the top flight. Loukia Prifti was the group's top scorer with 7 goals. In 2020–21, Agia Paraskevi achieved its best performance in the top flight, finishing second in its group without a defeat. In the playoff match, the team lost 2–0 to AEL and ultimately placed fourth overall. Vasiliki Petraki was the team's top scorer with 6 goals. At the end of the season, Charalampidis departed to take charge of Panathinaikos' newly formed women's teamand the club appointed former Greek national team coach Dimosthenis Kavouras. However, he was replaced before the start of the new season by Giannis Giannoglou. In 2021–22, Santa recorded its poorest campaign in the top division, being relegated without registering a win. Giannoglou renewed his contract in the summer, but he was let go in November 2022 after the first match of the 2022–23 season and was replaced by Glykeria Gkatzogianni. She helped the team finish third in her first season, and in 2023–24, Santa topped their group with 16 wins in 16 games. In the promotion playoffs, the club won two of three matches to secure a return to the A Division. In the cup, they were eliminated by Panathinaikos in the first round.

In the 2024–25 season, Giannis Charalampidis returned as head coach and led Agia Paraskevi to a sixth-place finish. Following the final game of the season against REA, the club filed an appeal due REA fielding an ineligible player. The HFF disciplinary committee awarded the match to Agia Paraskevi with a result of 0–3. Jazmin Issa was the team's top scorer with three goals. Santa were eliminated from the cup in the third round by REA.

== Honours ==
Agia Paraskevi W.F.C. honours santawfc.gr
Type	Competition	Titles	Winners	Runners-up	Third place
Domestic	Beta Ethniki (Second-tier)	2	2019–20 (Group 4), 2023–24	2014–15 (Group 2), 2016–17 (Group 2), 2017–18 (Group 2)	2015–16 (Group 2), 2022–23
Domestic	Gamma Ethniki (Third-tier)	1	2013–14 (Group 4)	2010–11 (Group 3), 2012–13 (Group 4)	

- record
- ^{S} Shared record

== Season to season ==
Season	League									Cup	UWCL	Top scorer	
Season	Div	Pos	Pld	W	D	L	GF	GA	Pts	Cup	UWCL	Name(s)	Goal
2010–11	C	2nd (Gr:III)	7	4	1	2	17	11	13		—		
2011–12	B	7th (Gr:II)	11	0	0	11			0		—		
2012–13	C	2nd (Gr:IV)	10	7	1	2	14	8	22	—	—		
2013–14	C	1st (Gr:IV)	11	10	0	1	50	5	30	—	—		
2014–15	B	2nd (Gr:II)								Second round	—		
2015–16	B	3rd (Gr:II)	8	4	3	1	21	9	15	Second round	—		
2016–17	B	2nd (Gr:II)	8	6	0	2	26	10	18	Quarterfinals	—	(Greece) Vasiliki Petraki	8
2017–18	B	2nd (Gr:II)	14	13	1	0	57	6	40		—	(Greece) Vasiliki Petraki	17
2018–19	A	9th	20	4	5	11	16	42	17		—	(Greece) Sofia Parmaxi (Greece) Eleni Kamarianou	4
2019–20	B	1st (Gr:IV)	10	8	2	0	25	1	26		—	(Greece) Loukia Prifti	7
2020–21	A	4th	11	6	4	1	16	3	22		—	(Greece) Vasiliki Petraki	6
2021–22	A	8th (Gr:II)	16	0	5	11	6	50	5		—	(Greece) Vasiliki Petraki (Greece) Georgia Despollari	2
2022–23	B	3rd	16	11	2	3	56	13	35		—	(Greece) Tonia Pournia	16
2023–24	B	1st	19	18	0	1	54	6	54	First round	—	(Greece) Vasiliki Petraki	17
2024–25	A	6th	22	7	6	9	16	17	27	Third round	—	(Denmark) Jazmin Issa	3
2025–26	A	7th	26	11	5	10	32	25	38	Semifinals	—	(Canada) Kendall Showers	6

== Current squad ==
As of 21 October 2026

Note: Flags indicate national team as defined under FIFA eligibility rules; some limited exceptions apply. Players may hold more than one non-FIFA nationality.

No.	Pos.	Nation	Player
1	GK	USA	Taiana Tolleson
2	MF	GRE	Melina Chatziioannou
3	DF	USA	Zoe Crockett
4	DF	SRB	Jasna Đorđević
7	MF	GRE	Pari Deliou
9	FW	NOR	Rikke Stoltenberg
10	FW	GRE	Loukia Prifti (captain)
11	MF	VEN	Nerimar Suarez
12	MF	GRE	Katerina Roumelioti
13	MF	GRE	Athina Papourtzi
14	MF	GRE	Margarita Mara
15	DF	GRE	Alkistis Dima

No.	Pos.	Nation	Player
17	MF	GRE	Nefeli Manaraki
19	FW	GRE	Ioulia Yiannakis
20	MF	GRE	Maria Zotou
21	MF	GRE	Agapi Lamprou
23	GK	ALB	Alexandra Kocibelli
25	MF	GRE	Melina Magklara
30	MF	GRE	Ifigeneia Skoularioti
34	DF	BEL	Lea Cordier
45	MF	GRE	Dora Preka
73	DF	GRE	Christina Pathiakaki
77	FW	GRE	Eleni Gkatsi
94	GK	GRE	Evi Zarra
99	FW	GRE	Katerina Proimou
—	FW	GRE	Filio Zekiou

== Personnel ==
=== Coaching staff ===
As of 5 December 2025

Position	Name
Head coach	(Greece) Dimitrios Kalykas
Assistant coach	(Greece) Konstantinos Lakiotis
Fitness coach	(Greece) Konstantinos Lakiotis
Performance director	(Greece) Alexandros Kapsis
Goalkeeping coach	(Greece) Konstantinos Drabalis
Analyst	(Greece) Panagiotis Kozakopoulos
Head physiotherapist	(Greece) Lefteris Tamvakis
Ground physiotherapist	(Greece) Alkiviadis Rouvas
Training assistant	(Greece) Thanasis Gkanos
Training assistant	(Greece) Ioanna Vali
Training assistant	(Greece) Nikos Chalkias

=== Managerial history ===
Name	Years
(Greece) Giannis Giannoglou	2009–2019
(Greece) Alexandros Skipos	2019
(Greece) Giannis Charalampidis	2019–2021
(Greece) Dimosthenis Kavouras	2021
(Greece) Giannis Giannoglou	2021–2022
(Greece) Glykeria Gkatzogianni	2022–2024
(Greece) Giannis Charalampidis	2024–2025
(Greece) Dimitrios Kalykas	2025–

== See also ==
- Agia Paraskevi F.C.
