= 2024–25 Greek A Division (women's football) =

36th season of top women's football (soccer) league in Greece

Greek A Division
- Season: 2024–25
- Dates: 5 October 2024 – 11 May 2025
- Champions: AEK Athens (1st title)
- Relegated: Kastoria GPO; Doxa 2016
- Women's Champions League: AEK Athens
- Matches: 132
- Goals: 357 (2.7 per match)
- Top goalscorer: Nikola Rybanská (22 goals)
- Biggest home win: AEK 7–0 Trikala; OFI 7–0 Trikala
- Biggest away win: Doxa 2016 0–7 Trikala
- Highest scoring: AEK 7–1 Nees Atromitou; AEK 4–4 REA; Nees Atromitou 3–5 OFI
- Longest winning run: 9 games Panathinaikos
- Longest unbeaten run: 13 games Panathinaikos
- Longest winless run: 22 games Doxa 2016
- Longest losing run: 17 games Doxa 2016
- All statistics correct as of 18 May 2025.

The 2024–25 Greek A Division season is the 36th season of the women's football top-level league in Greece. PAOK were the defending champions after winning the previous edition unbeaten. AEK Athens won their first league title four years after the team's founding.

The draw for the league was held on 20 September 2024 at the HFF headquarters in Athens.

== Teams ==
=== Changes ===
Promoted from 2023 to 2024 Greek B Division	Relegated from 2023–24 Greek A Division
Agia Paraskevi; Doxa 2016; Kifisia	AEL; Olympiada Imittou; Seirines Grevenon; Volos 2004; Elpides Karditsas

=== Stadiums and locations ===
Locations of the 2024–25 season clubs

Team	City	Stadium	Capacity
AEK Athens	Nea Filadelfeia	Agioi Anargyroi Municipal Stadium	
Agia Paraskevi	Agia Paraskevi	Municipal Stadium of Agia Paraskevi	2,800
Asteras Tripolis	Tripoli	Theodoros Kolokotronis Stadium	7,442
Doxa 2016	Drama	Doxa Drama Stadium	10,000
Kastoria	Kastoria	Municipal Stadium of Kastoria	8,000
Kifisia	Kifissia	Zirineio Stadium	1,500
Nees Atromitou	Peristeri	Chorafa Municipal Stadium	600
OFI Crete	Heraklion	Vardinoyianneio Sports Center	1,000
Panathinaikos	Athens	Rouf Municipal Stadium	1,600
PAOK	Thessaloniki	Neoi Epivates Stadium	1,090
REA	Rethymno	Sohora Municipal Stadium	1,300
Trikala 2011	Trikala	Trikala Municipal Stadium; Raxa-Sotira Sports Center	

=== Personnel and sponsorship ===
Team	Head coach	Captain	Kit manufacturer	Main shirt sponsor
AEK Athens	(Greece) Nikos Kotsovos	(Greece) Maria Kapnisi	Macron	None
Agia Paraskevi	(Greece) Giannis Charalampidis	(Greece) Loukia Prifti	Zeus	None
Asteras Tripolis	(Greece) Makis Tagtalidis	(Greece) Ioanna Melissou	Macron	Action 24
Doxa 2016	(Greece) Michalis Tsokatsidis	(Greece) Vasiliki Banti	Macron	San Ths Giagias
Kastoria	(Greece) Kostas Pantzaridis	(Greece) Thenia Zerva	Acerbis	Brown Coffee, Ohmami
Kifisia	(Greece) Giorgos Dimitropoulos	(Greece) Tonia Giannoutsou	Erima	W.I.N. Hellas
Nees Atromitou	(Greece) Kalomoira Kontomichi	(Serbia) Jasna Đorđević		Amarillo
OFI Crete	(Greece) Antonis Androulakis	(Greece) Vasso Kydonaki	Puma	Braden
Panathinaikos	(Serbia) Dragan Knežević	(Greece) Chara Dimitriou	Adidas	Pame Stoixima
PAOK	(Greece) Kostas Konstantinidis	(Greece) Thomai Vardali	Macron	Morris
REA	(Greece) Stelios Kozanidis	(Greece) Eleftheria Dafermou	Macron	MANKA
Trikala 2011	(Greece) Nikos Valomandras	(Greece) Rallou Tsouni	Macron	NoLo Cuisine

=== Managerial changes ===
Team	Outgoing manager	Manner of departure	Date of vacancy	Position in table	Incoming manager	Date of appointment
Panathinaikos	(Greece) Dimitris Rouvalis	Resigned	20 May 2024	End of season (3rd)	(Serbia) Dragan Knežević	1 July 2024
Asteras Tripolis	(Serbia) Dragan Knežević	End of contract	4 June 2024	Pre-season	(Greece) Makis Tagtalidis	8 July 2024
OFI Crete	(Greece) Kostas Pantzaridis	End of contract	3 July 2024	Pre-season	(Greece) Antonis Androulakis	3 July 2024
Agia Paraskevi	(Greece) Glykeria Gkatzogianni	End of contract	20 July 2024	Pre-season	(Greece) Giannis Charalampidis	25 July 2024
Kastoria	(Greece) Antonis Siskos (interim)	End of interim spell	1 August 2024	Pre-season	(Greece) Dimitris Rouvalis	1 August 2024
Doxa 2016	(Greece) Nikos Tsimplidis	Resigned	18 October 2024	12th	(Greece) Michalis Tsokatsidis	19 October 2024
Kastoria	(Greece) Dimitris Rouvalis	Sacked	19 October 2024	9th	(Greece) Antonis Siskos (interim)	19 October 2024
Kastoria	(Greece) Antonis Siskos (interim)	End of interim spell	28 November 2024	11th	(Greece) Kyrillos Kallimanis	28 November 2024
Kifisia	(Greece) Vangelis Karamoulas	Resigned	12 November 2024	9th	(Greece) Kimonas David (interim)	12 November 2024
Kifisia	(Greece) Kimonas David (interim)	End of interim spell	12 December 2024	11th	(Greece) Giorgos Dimitropoulos	12 December 2024
PAOK	(Greece) Thalis Theodoridis	Sacked	20 November 2024	4th	(Greece) Kostas Konstantinidis	20 November 2024
Kastoria	(Greece) Kyrillos Kallimanis	Sacked	15 January 2025	10th	(Greece) Kostas Pantzaridis	15 January 2025
Kifisia	(Greece) Giorgos Dimitropoulos	Sacked	1 April 2025	11th	(Greece) Thanasis Zygouris (interim)	1 April 2025

== League table ==
Pos	Team	Pld	W	D	L	GF	GA	GD	Pts	Qualification or relegation
1	AEK (C)	22	19	2	1	67	10	+57	59	Qualification for the Champions League qualifiers
2	Panathinaikos	22	17	1	4	38	14	+24	52	
3	OFI	22	16	2	4	50	15	+35	50	
4	Asteras Tripolis	22	14	4	4	40	15	+25	46	
5	PAOK	22	12	7	3	44	13	+31	43	
6	REA	22	7	6	9	33	28	+5	27	
7	Agia Paraskevi	22	6	6	10	14	20	−6	24	
8	Nees Atromitou	22	5	4	13	26	53	−27	19	
9	Kifisia	22	5	4	13	15	43	−28	19	
10	AO Trikala 2011	22	4	6	12	16	38	−22	18	
11	Kastoria GPO (R)	22	2	6	14	12	39	−27	12	Relegation to Greek B Division
12	Doxa 2016 (Note: In January 2025, Doxa 2016 withdrew from the competition after many players left the club. They were deducted 9 points by the Disciplinary Committee of the HFF.) (R)	22	0	2	20	2	69	−67	−7	Club withdrew from the league

Source: EPO
Rules for classification: 1) Points; 2) Head-to-head points; 3) Goal difference; 4) Number of goals scored; 5) Head-to-head goal difference; 6) Head-to-head away goals scored
(C) Champions; (R) Relegated

== Results ==
Home \ Away	AEK	AGI	AST	DOX	KAS	KIF	NEE	OFI	PAN	PAO	REA	TRI
AEK	—	1–0	2–1	5–0	6–0	4–1	7–1	1–0	3–0	3–0	4–4	7–0
Agia Paraskevi	0–1	—	0–0	0–0	1–1	0–1	2–1	0–1	0–2	1–1	0–1	1–0
Asteras Tripolis	0–0	3–0	—	3–0^{[b]}	3–0	2–0	5–1	3–1	0–1	0–0	3–1	1–0
Doxa 2016	0–3^{[b]}	0–3^{[b]}	0–3	—	0–0	0–3^{[b]}	0–3^{[b]}	0–3	0–3^{[b]}	0–3^{[b]}	0–2	0–7
Kastoria GPO	1–3	0–1	1–4	3–0^{[b]}	—	0–0	2–2	0–0	0–2	0–5	1–0	0–0
Kifisia	0–4	0–1	2–3	3–0^{[b]}	1–0	—	0–0	0–5	0–1	0–5	2–2	0–0
Nees Atromitou	1–6	0–2	0–2	4–1	2–1	1–2	—	3–5	1–2	0–4	2–2	0–0
OFI	0–1	2–0	3–1	3–0^{[b]}	1–0	2–0	4–0	—	2–0	3–1	2–1	7–0
Panathinaikos	1–0	1–0	0–2	3–0^{[b]}	3–1	3–0	0–3^{[a]}	2–1	—	1–1	2–0	3–0
PAOK	0–1	1–1	1–1	6–1	1–0	3–0	3–0	0–0	1–0	—	1–1	4–0
REA	0–1	3–1	0–1	3–0^{[b]}	3–1	4–0	3–0	1–3	1–2	0–1	—	0–0
AO Trikala 2011	0–4	0–0	0–1	3–0^{[b]}	1–0	3–0	0–1	1–2	0–4	0–2	1–1	—

Source: EPO
Legend: Blue = home team win; Yellow = draw; Red = away team win.

^{a} The match was cancelled and awarded to Nees Atromitou due to unsuitability of the goalposts.
^{b} Doxa 2016 withdrew from the league and their remaining matches were awarded to the opposing team.

== Season statistics ==
As of 18 May 2025

=== Goalscorers ===
Rank	Player	Club	Goals
1	(Slovakia) Nikola Rybanská	OFI	22
2	(Greece) Sophia Koggouli	AEK	16
2	(Cyprus) Eirini Michail	Asteras Tripolis	16
3	(Greece) Anastasia Spyridonidou	Panathinaikos	15
4	(Cyprus) Antri Violari	AEK	14
5	(Greece) Despoina Chatzinikolaou	AEK	11
6	(Greece) Dimitra Proxenou	Asteras Tripolis	7
6	(Greece) Thomai Vardali	PAOK	7
6	(India) Manisha Kalyan	PAOK	7
6	(Kenya) Topister Situma	REA	7

=== Assists ===
Rank	Player	Club	Assists
1	(Greece) Despoina Chatzinikolaou	AEK	15
2	(Mexico) Sofía Álvarez	AEK	9
3	(Nigeria) Peace Efih	OFI	8
4	(Greece) Thomai Vardali	PAOK	7
4	(Greece) Maria Mitkou	PAOK	7
5	(Greece) Ioanna Chamalidou	Panathinaikos	6
6	(Greece) Tatiana Georgiou	AEK	5
6	(Greece) Anastasia Tzaferi	Asteras Tripolis	5
6	(India) Manisha Kalyan	PAOK	5
7	(Greece) Sophia Koggouli	AEK	4
7	(Greece) Maria Paterna	OFI	4
7	(Greece) Maria Zotou	REA	4
7	(Greece) Maria Basouri	REA	4

=== Hat-tricks ===
Player	For	Against	Result	Date	Round
(Cyprus) Eirini Michail	Asteras Tripolis	Doxa 2016	3–0 (A)	6 October 2024	1
(Greece) Despoina Chatzinikolaou	AEK	Nees Atromitou	6–1 (A)	17 November 2024	5
(Greece) Konstantina Platania	Trikala	Doxa 2016	7–0 (A)	12 January 2025	9
(Slovakia) Nikola Rybanská^{4}	OFI	Kifisia	5–0 (A)	2 February 2025	12
(Greece) Anastasia Spyridonidou	Panathinaikos	Kifisia	3–0 (H)	16 March 2025	16
(Greece) Antigoni Papadopoulou	PAOK	Kifisia	5–0 (A)	24 April 2025	19
(Cyprus) Eirini Michail	Asteras Tripolis	Kifisia	3–2 (A)	18 May 2025	22
(Slovakia) Nikola Rybanská	OFI	Nees Atromitou	5–3 (A)	18 May 2025	22

(H) – Home; (A) – Away

Note: ^{4} – player scored 4 goals

=== Clean sheets ===
Rank	Player	Club	Clean sheets
1	(Greece) Dimitra Giannakouli	AEK	13
2	(Netherlands) Shania van Nuland	OFI	11
3	(Greece) Chrysoula Grigoriadou	Asteras Tripolis	9
3	(Greece) Zoi Nasi	Panathinaikos	9
3	(Brazil) Dani Neuhaus	PAOK	9
4	(Greece) Danai Dimitropoulou	Agia Paraskevi	8
5	(Greece) Danai Dragoutsou	Trikala	7
6	(Greece) Celia Katergiannaki	Doxa 2016/PAOK	5
6	(Greece) Panagiota Vlasiadou	Kastoria	5
6	(Colombia) Camila Vargas	Kifisia	5

== Awards ==
=== Best Greek Player ===
Winner	Club	Nominees	Source
Despoina Chatzinikolaou	AEK	Sophia Koggouli; Eleni Saich	

=== Best Foreign Player ===
Winner	Club	Nominees	Source
(Slovakia) Nikola Rybanská	OFI	(Cyprus) Eirini Michail (Japan) Suzuka Yosue	

=== Best Goalkeeper ===
Winner	Club	Nominees	Source
(Greece) Dimitra Giannakouli	AEK	(Greece) Chrysoula Grigoriadou (Greece) Zoi Nasi	

=== Best Young Player ===
Winner	Club	Nominees	Source
(Greece) Matina Ntarzanou	Panathinaikos	(Greece) Panagiota Argyriou (Greece) Sofia Zagkli	

=== Top Scorer ===
Winner	Club	Goals	Source
(Slovakia) Nikola Rybanská	OFI	22	

=== Best Coach ===
Winner	Club	Nominees	Source
(Greece) Nikos Kotsovos	AEK	(Greece) Stelios Kozanidis (Serbia) Dragan Knežević	

=== Best Greek Female Player Abroad ===
Winner	Club	Nominees	Source
Veatriki Sarri	(England) Everton	Athanasia Moraitou; Ioanna Papatheodorou	

=== Team of the Season ===
PSAPP Best XI
Goalkeeper	(Greece) Dimitra Giannakouli (AEK)			
Defenders	(Greece) Matina Ntarzanou (Panathinaikos)	(Greece) Georgia Pavlopoulou (AEK)	(Greece) Maria Gkouni (PAOK)	(Greece) Maria Mitkou (PAOK)
Midfielders	(Greece) Eleni Saich (Asteras Tripolis)	(Japan) Suzuka Yosue (REA)	(Cyprus) Eirini Michail (Asteras Tripolis)	(Cyprus) Antri Violari (AEK)
Forwards	(Slovakia) Nikola Rybanská (OFI)		(Greece) Despoina Chatzinikolaou (AEK)	
