= 2021–22 Greek A Division (women's football) =

33rd season of top women's football (soccer) league in Greece

Greek A Division
- Season: 2021–22
- Dates: 3 October 2021 – 28 May 2022
- Champions: PAOK; 17th title
- Relegated: Agia Paraskevi; Agrotikos Asteras; AEK Messolonghiou; Giannena; Doxa 2016; Feidon Argous
- Women's Champions League: PAOK
- Matches: 152
- Goals: 483 (3.18 per match)
- Top goalscorer: Esse Akida (18 goals)
- Biggest home win: PAOK 11–0 Agrotikos Asteras
- Biggest away win: Agrotikos Asteras 0–9 PAOK
- Highest scoring: PAOK 11–0 Agrotikos Asteras
- Longest winning run: 18 games PAOK
- Longest unbeaten run: 20 games PAOK
- Longest winless run: 16 games Agia Paraskevi; Feidon Argous
- Longest losing run: 12 games Agrotikos Asteras
- All statistics correct as of 1 September 2023.

The 2021–22 Greek A Division is the 33rd season of the women's football top-level league in Greece. PAOK won their 8th consecutive title and their 17th overall.

== Format ==
The Greek A Division for the 2021–22 season will be held in 2 groups of 9 teams, 18 teams in total. The separation of the teams into these groups will take place based on geographical criteria.

The championship will be held in two phases. In the 1st phase, the teams of each group will compete in two rounds. In the 2nd phase, a play-off round will be held to determine the champion.

The first two teams of each group will form a group of 4 teams and will compete in Phase B. The order of the games will be determined after a draw. No matches will be held between the teams that competed in the same group in Phase A. The matches of Phase B will be in two rounds and a total of 8 matches will be played in 4 matchdays.

After the end of Phase A, for the 2022–23 season, the teams which occupy the last 3 positions in each group will be relegated to the Greek B Division, a total of 6 teams.

== Team changes ==
Promoted from 2020–21 Greek B Division	Relegated from 2020–21 Greek A Division
N/A	Agrotikos Asteras Agias Varvaras; Atromitos; Caryatides Sparta; QOT 2012

== Regular season ==
=== Group 1 ===
==== Teams ====
Locations of the 2021–22 season Group 1 clubs

Team	City	Stadium	Capacity
Agrotikos Asteras	Evosmos	Agrotikos Asteras Stadium	2,267
Aris Thessaloniki	Thessaloniki	Agios Vasileios Stadium	
Doxa Dramas 2016	Drama	Iraklis Adrianis Stadium	1,000
Elpides Karditsas	Karditsa	Municipal Stadium of Karditsa	6,000
Giannena	Ioannina	EPFCA Stadium Ioannina	
Kastoria	Kastoria	Municipal Stadium of Kastoria	8,000
AEL	Larissa	Neapoli Stadium	2,000
PAOK	Thessaloniki	PAOK FC Sport Center	
Trikala 2011	Trikala	Trikala Municipal Stadium	15,000

==== League table ====
Pos	Team	Pld	W	D	L	GF	GA	GD	Pts	Qualification or relegation
1	PAOK	16	16	0	0	73	2	+71	48	Qualification for the play-off round
2	AEL	16	12	0	4	43	9	+34	36	Qualification for the play-off round
3	AO Trikala 2011	16	11	1	4	38	9	+29	34	
4	Aris Thessaloniki	16	8	2	6	30	18	+12	26	
5	Elpides Karditsas	16	6	4	6	19	23	−4	22	
6	Kastoria GPO	16	7	0	9	21	39	−18	21	
7	Doxa Dramas 2016	16	5	2	9	17	27	−10	17	Relegation to Greek B Division
8	Giannena WFC	16	1	1	14	4	48	−44	4	Relegation to Greek B Division
9	Agrotikos Asteras	16	1	0	15	2	72	−70	3	Relegation to Greek B Division

Rules for classification: 1) Points; 2) Head-to-head points; 3) Goal difference; 4) Number of goals scored; 5) Head-to-head goal difference; 6) Head-to-head away goals scored

==== Results ====
Home \ Away	AEL	AGR	ARI	DOX	ELP	GIA	KAS	PAO	TRI
AEL	—	7–0	2–0	7–1	0–1	3–0	4–1	0–2	2–3
Agrotikos Asteras	0–4	—	0–3	0–3	0–3	1–0	0–3	0–9	0–2
Aris Thessaloniki	0–2	5–0	—	4–1	1–1	5–0	3–1	0–3	0–3
Doxa Dramas 2016	0–1	3–0	2–3	—	1–1	1–0	1–0	0–1	0–3
Elpides Karditsas	0–1	4–0	1–0	1–1	—	3–0	1–0	0–7	0–1
Giannena WFC	0–3	1–0	0–3	0–3	1–1	—	1–3	0–7	0–2
Kastoria GPO	0–6	5–1	0–2	2–0	1–0	3–1	—	0–4	2–1
PAOK	1–0	11–0	2–1	3–0	7–1	6–0	7–0	—	2–0
AO Trikala 2011	0–1	9–0	0–0	1–0	2–1	4–0	7–0	0–1	—

Legend: Blue = home team win; Yellow = draw; Red = away team win.

=== Group 2 ===
==== Teams ====
Locations of the 2021–22 season Group 2 clubs

Team	City	Stadium	Capacity
Avantes Chalkida	Chalcis	Municipal Football Stadium of Avlida	2,000
Agia Paraskevi	Agia Paraskevi	Municipal Stadium of Agia Paraskevi	2,800
AEK Messolonghiou	Missolonghi	Messolonghi Municipal Stadium	3,500
Ergotelis	Heraklion	Nikos Kazantzakis Stadium	1,000
Neos Asteras Rethymnou	Rethymno	Sohora Municipal Stadium	
Odysseas Moschato	Moschato	Municipal Stadium of Moschato	900
OFI Crete	Heraklion	Krousonas Municipal Stadium	1,500
Olympiada Imittos	Ymittos	Hymettus Municipal Stadium	1,000
Feidon Argous	Argos	Kiveri Stadium	100

==== League table ====
Pos	Team	Pld	W	D	L	GF	GA	GD	Pts	Qualification or relegation
1	Avantes Chalkida	16	11	4	1	40	6	+34	37	Qualification for the play-off round
2	Ergotelis	16	11	4	1	36	5	+31	37	Qualification for the play-off round
3	OFI	16	11	3	2	34	12	+22	36	
4	Asteras Rethymnou	16	8	3	5	27	9	+18	27	
5	Olympiada Imittou	16	6	4	6	25	18	+7	22	
6	Odysseas Moschato	16	5	3	8	21	21	0	18	
7	AEK Messolonghiou	16	5	2	9	19	25	−6	17	Relegation to Greek B Division
8	Agia Paraskevi	16	0	5	11	6	50	−44	5	Relegation to Greek B Division
9	Feidon Argous	16	0	2	14	8	62	−54	2	Relegation to Greek B Division

Rules for classification: 1) Points; 2) Head-to-head points; 3) Goal difference; 4) Number of goals scored; 5) Head-to-head goal difference; 6) Head-to-head away goals scored

==== Results ====
Home \ Away	AEK	AGI	AST	AVA	ERG	FEI	ODY	OFI	OLY
AEK Messolonghiou	—	3–0	2–0	1–2	2–1	2–0	0–4	1–3	1–1
Agia Paraskevi	1–1	—	0–4	0–3	0–4	1–1	1–1	0–0	0–6
Asteras Rethymnou	2–0	2–0	—	1–0	1–1	7–0	1–1	1–2	0–0
Avantes Chalkida	2–0	6–0	5–0	—	0–0	6–0	2–0	5–1	2–0
Ergotelis	1–0	5–0	4–0	0–0	—	7–0	2–0	0–0	2–1
Feidon Argous	3–6	2–2	0–6	0–3	0–3	—	0–4	0–3	1–2
Odysseas Moschato	2–0	2–0	0–2	1–2	1–2	3–1	—	0–2	1–1
OFI	2–0	7–0	3–0	1–1	0–1	1–0	4–1	—	3–1
Olympiada Imittou	1–0	3–1	0–1	1–1	0–3	6–0	1–0	1–2	—

Legend: Blue = home team win; Yellow = draw; Red = away team win.

== Play-off round ==
Pos	Team	Pld	W	D	L	GF	GA	GD	Pts	Qualification or relegation	PAO	AEL	AVA	ERG
1	PAOK (C)	4	3	1	0	6	1	+5	10	Qualification for the Champions League qualifiers	—	–	1–0	2–0
2	AEL	4	2	0	2	7	5	+2	6		–	—	4–0	0–1
3	Avantes Chalkida	4	1	1	2	3	6	−3	4		1–1	2–0	—	–
4	Ergotelis	4	1	0	3	2	8	−6	3		0–2	2–3	–	—

Rules for classification: 1) Points; 2) Head-to-head points; 3) Goal difference; 4) Number of goals scored; 5) Head-to-head goal difference; 6) Head-to-head away goals scored
(C) Champions

== Season statistics ==
=== Top Scorers ===
As of 6 June 2022

Rank	Player	Club	Goals
1	(Kenya) Esse Akida	PAOK	17
2	(Canada) Kiyani Johnson	Ergotelis	13
3	(Colombia) Gisela Arrieta	Asteras Rethymnou	10
3	(Greece) Maria Basouri	PAOK	10
4	(Slovakia) Sasha Strubelova	AEL	9
4	(Pakistan) Aqsa Mushtaq	Avantes Chalkida	9
4	(Greece) Maria Mitkou	PAOK	9
4	(Greece) Konstantina Kostopoulou	Trikala	9
5	(United States) Nikolina Musto	AEL	8
5	(United States) Trista Seara	AEL	8
5	(Greece) Ilektra Plyta	Avantes Chalkida	8
5	(Estonia) Gerli Israel	OFI	8

== Awards ==
=== Top Scorer ===
Winner	Club	Goals	Source
(Kenya) Esse Akida	PAOK	17	

=== MVP ===
Winner	Club	Nominees	Source
(Pakistan) Aqsa Mushtaq	Avantes Chalkida	Vasia Giannaka; Danai Sidira	

=== Best Goalkeeper ===
Winner	Club	Nominees	Source
(Greece) Dimitra Giannakouli	Avantes Chalkida	Panagiota Vlasiadou; Panagiota Chatzicharistou	

=== Best Greek Female Player Abroad ===
Winner	Club	Nominees	Source
Veatriki Sarri	(England) Birmingham City	Eleni Kakambouki; Eleni Markou	
