= Ergotelis W.F.C. =

Greek women's association football club in Heraklion, Crete

G.S. Ergotelis Women Soccer
- Full name: Γυμναστικός Σύλλογος «Ο Εργοτέλης» Ηρακλείου Κρήτης; Gymnastikós Sýllogos «Ó Ergotélis» Iraklíou Krítis (Gymnastics Club «Ergotelis» Heraklion Crete)
- Nicknames: ĺ Kritikies (The Cretans) ĺ Kitrinómavres (The Yellow-Blacks)
- Ground: Nikos Kazantzakis Stadium
- Capacity: 1,000 (~600 seated)
- Chairman: Marios Papadakis
- League: Greek B Division
- 2025–26: Greek B Division, 5th (Gr:IV)
- Website: http://www.ergotelis.gr/gr
Home colours

The Gymnastics Club «Ergotelis» Heraklion Crete (Greek: Γυμναστικός Σύλλογος «O Εργοτέλης» Ηρακλείου Κρήτης, Γ.Σ. Εργοτέλης), commonly known simply as Ergotelis (Greek: Εργοτέλης), is a Greek women's association football club, department of the multi-sport club Gymnastics Club Ergotelis, which is based in Heraklion, Crete.

== Senior team history ==
=== as Nees Ergoteli (–2016) ===
Originally competing in national competitions as Nees Ergoteli (Greek: Νέες Εργοτέλη, Young Ergotelis (♀)) the club has played in the Pan-Hellenic Women's Football Championship for many years. It is the most successful Women's Football Club in Crete, clinging to a 4th-place finish in the highest professional women's football league in Greece and reaching the Greek Women's Cup semi-finals during the 2015−2016 season. Many of the club's athletes have received multiple call-ups for the Greek women's national football team as a result of the club's success.

=== as G.S. Ergotelis (2016–current) ===
In 2012, Ergotelis established a second women's football department, named after the parent club G.S. Ergotelis (Greek: Γ.Σ. Εργοτέλης) and consisting primarily of younger athletes from the club's training academies. After internal disputes led to the parent club's board of directors to shut-down and dissolve Nees Ergoteli in September 2016, «aiming to purge people and practices that are inappropriate for the ethos and history of Ergotelis», G.S. Ergotelis became the senior Ergotelis Women's football department. After its internal promotion to senior squad, Ergotelis won back-to-back Division titles in both the Gamma and Beta Ethniki, third and second tiers of the Greek women's football league system, thus managing a swift return of the club's women's football department back to top-flight. They since compete in the Pan-Hellenic Women's Football Championship, the top tier of the Greek women's football league system.

== Honours ==
=== Domestic ===
- Beta Ethniki (2nd National Division)
  - Winners (3): 2001–02, 2007–08, 2017–18
- Gamma Ethniki (3rd National Division)
  - Winners (1): 2016–17
- Greek Women's Cup
  - Semi-Finals (1): 2015−16
