= Greece women's national under-19 football team =

Women's national youth football team

Greece Women's U19
- Association: HFF
- Confederation: UEFA (Europe)
- Head coach: Giorgos Papakostas
- FIFA code: GRE

Biggest win
- Georgia 0–8 Greece; 20 September 2015; Kazakhstan 0–8 Greece; 8 October 2019

Biggest defeat
- Germany 9–0 Greece; 6 April 2013

Greece women's national under-19 football team represents Greece in international youth football competitions.

== Results and fixtures ==
- The following is a list of match results in the last 12 months, as well as any future matches that have been scheduled.

Legend

Win Draw Lose Fixture

=== 2026 ===
4 March 2026 Friendly	Serbia	1–0	Greece	Stara Pazova, Serbia
13:00 EET	Šarac 62'	Report		Stadium: Serbian FA Sports Center; Referee: Nikolina Purtić (Serbia)

7 March 2026 Friendly	Serbia	1–1	Greece	Stara Pazova, Serbia
13:00 EET	Zarubica 23'	Report	Platania 81'	Stadium: Serbian FA Sports Center

12 April 2026 2026 UEFA Women's Under-19 Championship qualification	Belgium	0–1	Greece	Września, Poland
15:00 EEST		Report	Nanou 78'	Stadium: Miejski Września; Referee: Karoline Marie Jensen (Norway)

15 April 2026 2026 UEFA Women's Under-19 Championship qualification	Greece	1–0	Romania	Września, Poland
15:00 EEST	Argyriou 67'	Report		Stadium: Sredzkie Centrum Sportu; Referee: Karoline Marie Jensen (Norway)

18 April 2026 2026 UEFA Women's Under-19 Championship qualification	Greece	0–3	Poland	Września, Poland
12:00 EEST		Report	Flis 25'; Zwiazek 62'; Świrska 90+5'	Stadium: Miejski Września; Referee: Sabina Bolic (Croatia)

9 October 2026 Friendly	Wales	1–2	Greece	Newport, Wales
17:00 EEST	Day 81' (pen.)	Report	Stavropoulou 28'; Schortsianiti 38' (pen.)	Stadium: Dragon Park; Referee: Gemma Border (Wales)

12 October 2026 Friendly	Wales	1–0	Greece	Newport, Wales
17:00 EEST	Holt 38'	Report		Stadium: Dragon Park; Referee: Erin Brennan (Wales)

27 November 2026 2027 UEFA Women's Under-19 Championship qualification – Round 1 – Group A3	Slovakia	v	Greece	Senec, Slovakia
17:30 EET		Report		Stadium: National Training Centre

30 November 2026 2027 UEFA Women's Under-19 Championship qualification – Round 1 – Group A3	Greece	v	Kosovo	Dunajská Streda, Slovakia
12:00 EET		Report		Stadium: DAC Football Academy

3 December 2026 2027 UEFA Women's Under-19 Championship qualification – Round 1 – Group A3	Greece	v	Poland	Dunajská Streda, Slovakia
12:00 EET		Report		Stadium: DAC Football Academy

- Official results and fixtures

== Euro 2027 Under-19 Championship qualification ==
=== 2027 UEFA Women's Under-19 Championship qualification ===
==== Group A3 ====
Pos	Team	Pld	W	D	L	GF	GA	GD	Pts	Transfer or relegation
1	Poland	0	0	0	0	0	0	0	0	Transfer to Round 2 League A
2	Greece	0	0	0	0	0	0	0	0	Transfer to Round 2 League A
3	Slovakia (H)	0	0	0	0	0	0	0	0	Transfer to Round 2 League A
4	Kosovo	0	0	0	0	0	0	0	0	Relegation to Round 2 League B

First match(es) will be played: 27 November 2026. Source: UEFA
Rules for classification: Tiebreakers
(H) Hosts

== Players ==
=== Current squad ===
As of 9 October 2026

The following players were called up for the 2027 UEFA Women's Under-19 Championship qualification matches in Slovakia between 27 November and 3 December 2026.

No.	Pos.	Player	Date of birth (age)	Caps	Goals	Club
	GK	Dimitra Teneketzi	27 February 2008 (age 18)	2	0	(Hellenic Football Federation) Mykonos
	GK	Alesia Lekaj		0	0	(Hellenic Football Federation) Volos
	DF	Ioanna Bataoula (captain)	17 December 2009 (age 16)	2	0	(Hellenic Football Federation) OFI
	DF	Maria Gkizari	20 February 2009 (age 17)	2	0	(Hellenic Football Federation) PAOK
	DF	Margarita Mara	31 October 2009 (age 17)	2	0	(Hellenic Football Federation) Agia Paraskevi
	DF	Chrysi Michalakopoulos	16 November 2009 (age 17)	0	0	(German Football Association) SV Fortuna Freudenberg
	DF	Niki Malamousi	8 July 2008 (age 18)	0	0	(Hellenic Football Federation) PAOK
	DF	Myrto Axiarli	22 August 2008 (age 18)	6	0	(Hellenic Football Federation) REA
	DF	Nefeli Manaraki		1	0	(Hellenic Football Federation) Agia Paraskevi
	MF	Katerina Prapa	12 August 2008 (age 18)	7	0	(Hellenic Football Federation) Kifisia
	MF	Ioli Stavropoulou	1 January 2009 (age 17)	2	1	(Hellenic Football Federation) PAOK
	MF	Myrto Kolempa	1 December 2008 (age 17)	11	1	(Hellenic Football Federation) Olympiacos
	MF	Elisavet Schortsianiti	11 December 2009 (age 16)	2	1	(Hellenic Football Federation) PAOK
	MF	Sofia Velissaridou	19 March 2008 (age 18)	2	0	(Hellenic Football Federation) Seirines Grevenon
	MF	Kalliopi Tatsi		0	0	(Hellenic Football Federation) AC Pontion Drapetsonas
	FW	Evelina Tzatzo		2	0	(German Football Association) 1. FC Union Berlin
	FW	Griselda Tsela	3 August 2008 (age 18)	4	0	(Polish Football Association) Pogoń Szczecin
	FW	Panagiota Argyriou	23 February 2008 (age 18)	8	4	(Hellenic Football Federation) PAOK
	FW	Isabel Kyprislidis		2	0	(United States Soccer Federation) LIU Sharks
	FW	Georgia Vlachonikoli	1 October 2009 (age 17)	1	0	(Hellenic Football Federation) Kifisia

=== Recent call-ups ===
- The following players have been called up to a Greece squad in the past 12 months.

Pos.	Player	Date of birth (age)	Caps	Goals	Club	Latest call-up
GK	Eva Konstantinidou	7 January 2008 (age 18)	2	0	(Greece) PAOK	v. Wales, 12 October 2026
GK	Fani Kostopoulou		0	0	(Greece) Panathinaikos	v. Wales, 12 October 2026
GK	Eirini Manoukaraki	15 November 2007 (age 19)	12	0	(Greece) REA	v. Poland, 18 April 2026
GK	Christina Forliaka	25 October 2007 (age 19)	4	0	(Greece) Kifisia	v. Poland, 18 April 2026
GK	Sophia Kouris	28 November 2007 (age 18)	1	0	(Canada) Douglas College Royals	v. Serbia, 7 March 2026
DF	Eleana Katsika	14 July 2008 (age 18)	9	0	(Germany) FC Schalke 04	v. Wales, 12 October 2026
DF	Tzoanna Rakipi	29 April 2009 (age 17)	2	0	(Greece) Doxa Pigadakion	v. Wales, 12 October 2026
DF	Ifigeneia Skoularioti		0	0	(Greece) Agia Paraskevi	v. Wales, 12 October 2026
DF	Markella Pastra	19 October 2007 (age 19)	6	0	(Greece) Kifisia	v. Poland, 18 April 2026
DF	Amaryllis Kosta	19 August 2007 (age 19)	13	0	(Greece) Asteras Tripolis	v. Poland, 18 April 2026
DF	Evmorfia Kiourexidou	13 September 2007 (age 19)	13	1	(Greece) PAOK	v. Poland, 18 April 2026
DF	Marina Theodoraki	30 April 2007 (age 19)	13	0	(Poland) Medyk Konin	v. Poland, 18 April 2026
DF	Kalliopi Kalokairinou	29 May 2007 (age 19)	15	0	(Greece) Panathinaikos	v. Poland, 18 April 2026
DF	Ioanna Ntati	12 October 2007 (age 19)	11	0	(Greece) Kifisia	v. Serbia, 7 March 2026
DF	Paraskevi Deliou	20 January 2007 (age 19)	13	0	(Greece) Agia Paraskevi	v. Serbia, 7 March 2026
DF	Agathi Kolovou	23 December 2007 (age 18)	1	0	(Greece) Panetolikos	v. Serbia, 7 March 2026
MF	Zeta Moschona	17 May 2008 (age 18)	5	0	(Greece) Pyrgos	v. Wales, 12 October 2026
MF	Konstantina Ntagkinis		2	0	(United States) Shattuck-Saint Mary's School	v. Wales, 12 October 2026
MF	Evangelia Nanou	25 May 2007 (age 19)	15	3	(Greece) Panathinaikos	v. Poland, 18 April 2026
MF	Konstantina Platania	4 August 2007 (age 19)	18	4	(Greece) Asteras Tripolis	v. Poland, 18 April 2026
MF	Maria-Eleni Mougiou	17 July 2007 (age 19)	19	1	(Greece) AEK	v. Poland, 18 April 2026
MF	Eftychia Kordi	9 March 2009 (age 17)	1	0	(Greece) Chalkida	v. Serbia, 7 March 2026
FW	Katerina Proimou	17 November 2009 (age 17)	2	0	(Greece) Agia Paraskevi	v. Wales, 12 October 2026
FW	Viktoria Krystalli	22 May 2009 (age 17)	2	0	(Greece) Seirines Grevenon	v. Wales, 12 October 2026
FW	Maria Petraki	6 February 2008 (age 18)	2	0	(Greece) Veria	v. Poland, 18 April 2026
FW	Maryam Melissanidis	1 December 2008 (age 17)	7	0	(Germany) Eintracht Frankfurt	v. Poland, 18 April 2026
FW	Asimina Chatziioannou	7 May 2007 (age 19)	4	0	(Greece) Doxa 2016	v. Poland, 18 April 2026
FW	Electra Tzourtzevits	5 January 2007 (age 19)	17	2	(Greece) Panathinaikos	v. Poland, 18 April 2026
FW	Mila Ivits	28 February 2007 (age 19)	8	0	(United States) Long Beach State Beach	v. Serbia, 7 March 2026
FW	Ioulia Yiannakis	18 October 2008 (age 18)	2	0	(Greece) Agia Paraskevi	v. Serbia, 7 March 2026

== Competitive record ==
=== UEFA Women's U19 Championship record ===
UEFA Women's U19 Championship record									UEFA Women's U19 Championship Qualification record						
Year	Round	Position	Pld	W	D	L	GF	GA	Pld	W	D	L	GF	GA	GD
No host 1998	did not qualify								2	0	0	2	0	3	-3
(Sweden) 1999	did not enter								did not enter						
(France) 2000	did not enter								did not enter						
(Norway) 2001	did not enter								did not enter						
(Sweden) 2002	did not qualify								3	0	0	3	0	23	-23
(Germany) 2003	did not qualify								3	1	0	2	6	17	-11
(Finland) 2004	did not qualify								3	0	0	3	0	8	-8
(Hungary) 2005	did not qualify								6	1	0	5	5	12	-7
(Switzerland) 2006	did not qualify								6	1	0	5	3	22	-19
(Iceland) 2007	did not qualify								3	0	1	2	1	4	-3
(France) 2008	did not qualify								3	1	0	2	2	8	-6
(Belarus) 2009	did not qualify								3	0	1	2	1	5	-4
(North Macedonia) 2010	did not qualify								3	0	0	3	2	9	-7
(Italy) 2011	did not qualify								3	1	0	2	3	10	-7
(Turkey) 2012	did not qualify								3	1	1	1	7	9	-2
(Wales) 2013	did not qualify								6	2	1	3	8	16	-6
(Norway) 2014	did not qualify								3	1	0	2	4	7	-3
(Israel) 2015	did not qualify								3	1	0	2	8	5	+3
(Slovakia) 2016	did not qualify								6	2	0	4	9	17	-8
(Northern Ireland) 2017	did not qualify								3	1	0	2	3	6	-3
(Switzerland) 2018	did not qualify								6	0	2	4	3	17	-14
(Scotland) 2019	did not qualify								6	1	1	4	3	11	-8
(Georgia (country)) 2020	Cancelled								3	1	0	2	8	11	-3
(Belarus) 2021	Cancelled								Cancelled						
(Czech Republic) 2022	did not qualify								6	3	0	3	15	8	+7
(Belgium) 2023	did not qualify								6	2	1	3	7	13	-6
(Lithuania) 2024	did not qualify								6	2	1	3	7	13	-6
(Poland) 2025	did not qualify								6	2	0	4	6	12	-6
(Bosnia and Herzegovina) 2026	did not qualify								6	4	0	2	7	7	0
(Hungary) 2027	TBD								TBD						
Total	—								107	28	9	70	118	273	-155

== See also ==
- Greece women's national football team
- Greece women's national under-17 football team
