= Greek Women's Cup =

Women's association football cup in Greece

Women's Greece Cup
- Organiser(s): Hellenic Football Federation
- Founded: 2000; 26 years ago
- Region: Greece
- Teams: 28 (2025)
- Related competitions: Women's Alpha Ethniki
- Current champions: PAOK (8th title)
- Most championships: PAOK (8 titles)
- Website: www.epo.gr
- 2026–27 Greek Women's Cup

The Greek Women's Cup (Greek: Ελληνικό Κύπελλο Γυναικών), officially known as the Women's Greece Cup (Greek: Κύπελλο Ελλάδας Γυναικών) is the national women's association football competition in Greece. It was played out for three seasons from 2000 to 2002. It returned in the 2012–13 season. Moreover, it was played out from 2017 to 2023 and returned in the 2023–24 season.

== List of finals ==
The following is a list of all the finals.

Year	Winner	Result	Runner-up
2000	G.S. Olympiada '96 Thessaloniki	2–0	Ifestos Peristeri
2001	G.S. Kavala '86	3–1 (a.e.t.)	Ifestos Peristeri
2002	PAOK	4–0	Doxa Piraeus
2013	PAOK	1–0 (a.e.t.)	Elpides Karditsas
2014	PAOK	4–1	Amazones Dramas
2015	PAOK	0–0 (a.e.t.) 4–3 (p.)	Odysseas Glyfadas
2016	PAOK	2–0	Amazones Dramas
2017	PAOK	7–0	Fidon Argous
2024	PAOK	1–1 (a.e.t.) 5–4 (p.)	AEK Athens
2025	AEK Athens	2–0	Panathinaikos
2026	PAOK	2–0	Asteras Tripolis

== Performance by club ==
Club	Titles	Season
PAOK	8	2002, 2013, 2014, 2015, 2016, 2017, 2024, 2026
AEK Athens	1	2025
Olympiada Thessaloniki	1	2000
Kavala '86	1	2001

== See also ==
- Greek A Division (women's football)
