= 2024 Greek Women's Cup =

Κύπελλο Ελλάδας Γυναικών

Tournament details
- Country: Greece
- Dates: 13 March – 22 May 2024
- Teams: 34

Final positions
- Champions: PAOK (7th title)
- Runners-up: AEK

Tournament statistics
- Matches played: 33
- Goals scored: 128 (3.88 per match)
- Top goal scorer: Despoina Chatzinikolaou (6 goals)

The 2024 Greek Women's Cup is the 9th edition of the Greek women's association football national cup organized by the Hellenic Football Federation (HFF). The cup was last held in 2017 with PAOK being the defending champions.

PAOK won their 7th title by beating AEK on penalties in the final.

== Schedule and format ==
In the first phase, teams from the same municipality or/and from the same region will compete. The championship will initially be played in eight (8) groups. The division of the teams into groups will take place based on geographical criteria, with exceptions for island clubs.

All ties are played in a single-match decider at the home ground of the lower division opponent. If both sides belong to the same tier, the team that was guest in previous round will be the host or a draw will be held.

Round	Draw date	Match date	Fixtures	Clubs	Format details
First round	5 March	13–26 March	16	32 → 18	Knock-out tournament type: Single match.
Second round	5 March	27 March–17 April	10	18 → 8	Knock-out tournament type: Single match.
Quarter-finals	12 April	24–25 April	4	8 → 4	Knock-out tournament type: Single match.
Semi-finals	12 April	15 May	2	4 → 2	Knock-out tournament type: Single match.
Final	12 April	22 May	1	2 → 1	Single match.

== First phase ==
=== Draw ===
The draw was completed by the HFF on 5 March 2024, at the federation's headquarters in Nea Smyrni, Athens.

=== Group 1 ===
==== Bracket ====
Round 1
Episkopi Rethymnou	0
OFI	9
Stilvi Chania	0
Poseidon Kamisianon-Rapanion	3

Round 2
Poseidon Kamisianon-Rapanion	0
OFI	4

==== Matches ====
===== Round 1 =====
20 March	Episkopi Rethymnou	0–9	OFI	Episkopi, Rethymno
16:00 EEST (UTC+3)			Peiou 1'; 8' (o.g.); Zerva 12'; Platania 55'; Papakonstanti 63'; Drakogiannaki 64'; Mushtaq 69'; Kaláberová 78'; Koniotaki 83'	Stadium: Dimotiko Gipedo Episkopis; Referee: Evangelia Vragou (Chania)

20 March	Stilvi Chania	0–3	Poseidon Kamisianon-Rapanion	Agia Marina, Chania
16:00 EEST (UTC+3)			Kokkinaki 65', 70'; Melaki 75'	Stadium: Dimotiko Gipedo Agias Marinas; Referee: Dimitrios Zioutis (Chania)

===== Round 2 =====
27 March	Poseidon Kamisianon-Rapanion	0–4	OFI	Kolymvari, Chania
16:00 EEST (UTC+3)			Peiou; Karantonaki 12' (o.g.); Drakogiannaki; Koniotaki 55'	Stadium: Gipedo Kolymvariou

=== Group 2 ===
==== Bracket ====
Round 1
Anagennisi Alexandroupolis	0
Pontiakos	2
Vasilissa Tis Thrakis	3
Soufli 2018	0

Round 2
Pontiakos	1 (2)
Vasilissa Tis Thrakis (p)	1 (4)

==== Matches ====
===== Round 1 =====
13 March	Anagennisi Alexandroupolis	0–2	Pontiakos	Alexandroupoli, Evros
16:00 EEST (UTC+3)			Konstantaki	Stadium: Gipedo KTEO; Referee: Efstratios Stratoudus (Evros)

13 March	Vasilissa Tis Thrakis	3–0	Soufli 2018	Thalassia, Xanthi
16:00 EEST (UTC+3)	Kyriazidou; M. Chatziantoniou			Stadium: Dimotiko Gipedo Thalassias; Referee: Panagiotis Konstantinidis (Kavala)

===== Round 2 =====
3 April	Pontiakos	1–1 (2–4 p)	Vasilissa Tis Thrakis	Alexandroupoli, Evros
16:00 EEST (UTC+3)	Ilia 73'		Metoikidou 27'	Stadium: Gipedo KTEO

==== Group 3 ====
===== Bracket =====
Round 1
Skiouroi (Shooters WFC)	1
Aris Thessaloniki	6
Doxa 2016	1
PAOK	6

Round 2
Aris Thessaloniki	0
PAOK	4

==== Matches ====
===== Round 1 =====
20 March	Skiouroi	1–6	Aris Thessaloniki	Pylaia, Thessaloniki
16:00 EEST (UTC+3)	Geka		Savvidou; Moschidou; Koupetsidou; Kokoviadou; Mperati	Stadium: Antonis Karampourniotis Stadium; Referee: Athanasios Donis (Macedonia)

13 March	Doxa 2016	1–6	PAOK	Drama, Drama
16:00 EEST (UTC+3)	Mpampali 70'	Report	Papadopoulou 2', 78'; Giannaka 13', 36'; Vardali 65'; Chalatsogianni 86'	Stadium: Gipedo Doxas Dramas; Referee: Christos Papadopoulos (Xanthi)

===== Round 2 =====
27 March	Aris Thessaloniki	0–4	PAOK	Agios Vasileios, Thessaloniki
16:00 EEST (UTC+3)		Report	Giannaka 31', 39'; Argyriou 45'; Papadopoulou 46'	Stadium: Gipedo Agiou Vasileiou

==== Group 4 ====
===== Bracket =====
Round 1
Nereids Phthias	1
PAS Lamia 1964	0
Leontikos Kifisias	1
AO Trikala 2011	2

Round 2
Nereids Phthias	0
AO Trikala 2011	3

==== Matches ====
===== Round 1 =====
20 March	Nereids Phthias	1–0	PAS Lamia 1964	Megali Vrysi, Phthiotis
16:00 EEST (UTC+3)	Ogici 22'			Stadium: Alexandros Papathanasis Stadium; Referee: Nikolaos Papakonstantinou (Phtias)

13 March	Leontikos Kifisias	1–2	AO Trikala 2011	Kifissia, Athens
12:00 EEST (UTC+3)	Koratzinou		Kostopoulou; Kalkani	Stadium: I. Zyrinis Municipal Stadium; Referee: Evangelia Stefanopoulou (Athens)

===== Round 2 =====
17 April	Nereids Phthias	0–3	AO Trikala 2011	Megali Vrysi, Phthiotis
15:00 EEST (UTC+3)			Smilijković 4'; Kechagia 30'; Bousinou 60'	Stadium: Alexandros Papathanasis Stadium

==== Group 5 ====
===== Bracket =====
Round 1
KAO Filinos	0
Stavros Kalithion WFC	4
AC Pontion Drapetsonas	0
AEK	2

Round 2
Stavros Kalithion WFC	0
AEK	9

==== Matches ====
===== Round 1 =====
20 March	KAO Filinos	0–4	Stavros WFC	Kos, Kos
21:30 EEST (UTC+3)			Tachramani 19', 53'; Flevari 36'; Konstantinou 72'	Stadium: Neo Dimotiko Stadio Antagoras; Referee: Dimitrios Mastrogiannakos (Dodekanes)

26 March	AC Pontion Drapetsonas	0–2	AEK	Drapetsona, Piraeus
16:00 EEST (UTC+3)		Report	Kapnisi 27'; Chatzinikolaou 65'	Stadium: Dimotiko Gipedo Drapetsonas

===== Round 2 =====
3 April	Stavros WFC	0–9	AEK	Kalythies, Rhodes
15:00 EEST (UTC+3)		Report	Ivits 4'; Bartzakli 28'; Chatzinikolaou; Stefatou; Tzoutzouraki; Nika	Stadium: Dimotiko Gipedo Kalythion

==== Group 6 ====
===== Bracket =====
Round 1
Nees Drapetsonas	0
Odysseas Moschatou	9
Kalloni SC	0
Olympiada Imittou	5

Round 2
Odysseas Moschatou	0
Olympiada Imittou	1

==== Matches ====
===== Round 1 =====
13 March	Nees Drapetsonas	0–9	Odysseas Moschatou	Drapetsona, Piraeus
21:00 EEST (UTC+3)				Stadium: Dimotiko Gipedo Drapetsonas; Referee: Georgios Liatsos (Piraeus)

13 March	Kalloni SC	0–5	Olympiada Imittou	Parakoila, Lesbos
11:30 EEST (UTC+3)			Karathanasi 4', 80'; Gkiogkeza 35'; Vervati 37'; Veini 57'	Stadium: Dimotiko Gipedo Parakoilon; Referee: Charalampos Patsatzis (Lesvos)

===== Round 2 =====
3 April	Odysseas Moschatou	0–1	Olympiada Imittou	Moschato, Athens
17:00 EEST (UTC+3)			Veniamin	Stadium: Municipal Stadium of Moschato

==== Group 7 ====
===== Bracket =====
Round 1
13 March
Acharnaikos	1
Fostiras Kaisarianis	0

Round 2
27 March
Acharnaikos	1
Agia Paraskevi	2
13 March
Diagoras Rachon Ikarias	0
Panathinaikos	9

Round 3
17 April
Agia Paraskevi	0
Panathinaikos	4

==== Matches ====
===== Round 1 =====
13 March	Acharnaikos	1–0	Fostiras Kaisarianis	Acharnes, Attica
16:00 EEST (UTC+3)	Tikopoulou 52'			Stadium: Dimotiko Gipedo Acharnon; Referee: Dimitrios Tzafolias (East Attica)

13 March	Diagoras Rachon Ikarias	0–9	Panathinaikos	Evdilos, Ikaria
15:00 EEST (UTC+3)		Report	Grant 11'; Kanellou 12', 24', 82'; Spyridonidou 15', 21'; Siafarika 18', 46'; Katopodi 57'	Stadium: Dimotiko Gipedo Eudilou; Referee: Konstantinos Galatoudis (Samos)

===== Round 2 =====
27 March	Acharnaikos	1–2	Agia Paraskevi	Acharnes, Attica
20:00 EEST (UTC+3)			Proimou 21'; Prifti 40'	Stadium: Dimotiko Gipedo Acharnon

===== Round 3 =====
17 April	Agia Paraskevi	0–4	Panathinaikos	Agia Paraskevi, Athens
20:00 EEST (UTC+3)		Report	Kanellou 8', 32'; Chamalidou 18'; Spyridonidou 48'	Stadium: Gipedo Notou

==== Group 8 ====
===== Bracket =====
Round 1
20 March
PAS Giannina	0
Giannena WFC	4

Round 2
3 April
Giannena WFC	0
Asteras Tripolis	5
13 March
PAS Agiou Georgiou	0
Flamingo Mesolonghiou (MSL FC)	4

Round 3
17 April
Flamingo Mesolonghiou (MSL FC)	0
Asteras Tripolis	3

==== Matches ====
===== Round 1 =====
20 March	PAS Giannina	0–4	Giannena WFC	Ioannina, Ioannina
16:00 EEST (UTC+3)			Varsani 19', 23'; Kaitatzi 87'; Avgeri 90'	Stadium: Gipedo Epirus FCA; Referee: Apostolos Dadanis (Epirus)

13 March	PAS Agiou Georgiou	0–4	Flamingo Mesolonghiou	Kato Assos, Corinthia
16:00 EEST (UTC+3)			Ntourantoni 21'; Mokka 60'; Papaioannou 62'; Papadogeorgou 85'	Stadium: Gipedo Assou; Referee: Evangelos Demertzis (West Attica)

===== Round 2 =====
3 April	Giannena WFC	0–5	Asteras Tripolis	Ioannina, Ioannina
16:00 EEST (UTC+3)		Report	Moskofidou 3', 18', 41'; Baska 19'; Malliari 65'	Stadium: Stathis Tsanaktsis Stadium

===== Round 3 =====
17 April	Flamingo Mesolonghiou	0–3	Asteras Tripolis	Evinochori, Aetolia-Acarnania
16:00 EEST (UTC+3)		Report	Karagianni 14'; Tzaferi 20'; Baska 77'	Stadium: Gipedo Evinochoriou

- HFF

== Second phase ==
=== Draw ===
The draw was completed by the HFF on 12 April 2024, at the federation's headquarters in Nea Smyrni, Athens.

=== Bracket ===
Quarter-finals
Vasilissa Tis Thrakis	1
Olympiada Imittou	3
AEK	3
Asteras Tripolis	0
AO Trikala 2011	0
OFI	2
PAOK (a.e.t.)	1
Panathinaikos	0

Semi-finals
Olympiada Imittou	0
AEK	4
OFI	0
PAOK	1

Final
AEK	1 (4)
PAOK (p)	1 (5)

=== Quarter-finals ===
==== Matches ====
24 April	Vasilissa Tis Thrakis	1–3	Olympiada Imittou	Koutso, Xanthi
13:00 EEST (UTC+3)	Kyriazidou 9' (pen.)	Report	Vervati 13'; Mylona 74'; Dalmédico 75'	Stadium: Dimotio Gipedo Koutsou; Referee: Vasilios Chorozoglou (Drama)

24 April	AEK	3–0	Asteras Tripolis	Elliniko, Athens
16:00 EEST (UTC+3)	Kapnisi 17' (pen.); Chatzinikolaou 89', 90+'	Report		Stadium: Gipedo Sourmenon; Referee: Andromachi Tsiofliki (Larissa)

25 April	AO Trikala 2011	0–2	OFI	Trikala, Trikala
12:00 EEST (UTC+3)			Mushtaq 17'; Zerva 23'	Stadium: Trikala Municipal Stadium; Referee: Thomas Mpourouzikas (Larissa)

24 April	PAOK	1–0 (a.e.t.)	Panathinaikos	Neoi Epivates, Thessaloniki
16:00 EEST (UTC+3)	Giannaka 117'	Report		Stadium: Neoi Epivates Stadium; Referee: Georgios Kokkinos (Chalkidiki)

=== Semi-finals ===
==== Matches ====
15 May
16:00 EEST (UTC+3)

Olympiada Imittou	0–4	AEK
	Report	Stefatou 10', 51'; Nika 58'; Kapnisi 81'

Dimotiko Stadio Ymittou, Ymittos, Athens
Referee: Ioannis Stergiotis (Athens)

15 May
17:00 EEST (UTC+3)

OFI	0–1	PAOK
	Report	Vardali 50'

Vardinogiannis Sport Center, Gazi, Heraklion
Referee: Dimitrios Moschou (Lasithi)

=== Final ===
22 May
16:00 EEST (UTC+3)

AEK	1–1 (a.e.t.)	PAOK
Stefatou 49'	HFF Report	Papadopoulou 22'
Penalties
Stefatou (penalty scored); Kapnisi (penalty scored); Pineda (penalty scored); Nika (penalty missed); Chatzinikolaou (penalty scored)	4–5	Mitkou (penalty scored); Chalatsogianni (penalty scored); Papadopoulou (penalty scored); Koskeridou (penalty scored); Giannaka (penalty scored)

Panthessaliko Stadium, Volos, Magnesia
Referee: Andromachi Tsiofliki (Larissa)

GK	1	(Greece) Panagiota Chatzicharistou
RB	4	(Greece) Georgia Pavlopoulou
CB	10	(Greece) Maria Kapnisi
CB	2	(Colombia) Tatiana Vera
LB	14	(Greece) Eleni Tselenti
DM	7	(Greece) Christina Kollia (c)
CM	8	(Greece) Eleni Stefatou
CM	5	(Colombia) Vennus Pineda
RW	3	(Greece) Pelagia-Grigoria Bartzakli	(substituted off) 65'
LW	17	(Greece) Voula Tzoutzouraki	(substituted off) 86'
CF	9	(Greece) Stella Tzani	(substituted off) 46'
Substitutes:
GK	15	(Albania) Aleksandra Kocibelli
FW	6	(Greece) Mila-Michaela Ivits
MF	11	(Greece) Antonia Nika	(substituted on) 86'
DF	12	(Greece) Maria Markou
MF	18	(Greece) Georgia Trivyzaki	(substituted on) 65'
DF	20	(Greece) Jenny Aspradaki
FW	21	(Greece) Despoina Chatzinikolaou	(substituted on) 46'
Manager:
(Greece) Nikos Kotsovos

GK	1	(Brazil) Dani Neuhaus
RB	2	(Greece) Markella Koskeridou
CB	27	(Greece) Morfoula Kiourexidou
CB	5	(Greece) Maria Gkouni
LB	17	(Greece) Maria Mitkou
DM	6	(Greece) Konstantina Strantzali (substituted off) 57'
DM	22	(Greece) Georgia Chalatsogianni
RM	8	(Greece) Vasiliki Giannaka
CM	10	(Greece) Thomai Vardali (c) (substituted off) 75'
LM	9	(Sweden) Emelie Helmvall (substituted off) 112'
CF	28	(Greece) Antigoni Papadopoulou
Substitutes:
GK	15	(Greece) Cylia Katergiannaki
MF	3	(Greece) Anastasia Sidiropoulou
DF	4	(Azerbaijan) Ayshan Ahmadova
DF	13	(Greece) Fani Doiranli (substituted on) 57'
FW	14	(Kenya) Esse Akida (substituted on) 112'
FW	18	(Greece) Electra Tzourtzevits
FW	19	(Greece) Elpida Katsanou
MF	21	(Greece) Konstantina Kalietzidou
FW	24	(Greece) Panagiota Argyriou (substituted on) 75'
Manager:
(Greece) Thalis Theodoridis

- HFF

== Top goalscorers ==
As of 22 May 2024

Rank	Player	Club	Goals
1	(Greece) Despoina Chatzinikolaou	AEK	6
2	(Greece) Eleni Stefatou	AEK	5
2	(Greece) Christina Kanellou	Panathinaikos	5
2	(Greece) Vasiliki Giannaka	PAOK	5
3	(Greece) Antigoni Papadopoulou	PAOK	4
4	(Greece) Maria Kapnisi	AEK	3
4	(Greece) Vasiliki Moskofidou	Asteras Tripolis	3
4	(Greece) Anastasia Spyridonidou	Panathinaikos	3
4	(Greece) Maria Kyriazidou	Vasilissa Tis Thrakis	3
