= 2025–26 Greek Women's Cup =

Κύπελλο Ελλάδας Γυναικών

Tournament details
- Country: Greece
- Dates: 15 October 2025 – 24 May 2026
- Teams: 38

Final positions
- Champions: PAOK (8th title)
- Runners-up: Asteras Tripolis

Tournament statistics
- Matches played: 41
- Goals scored: 148 (3.61 per match)
- Top goal scorer(s): Eleni Garyfallidou (6 goals)

The 2025–26 Greek Women's Cup is the 11th edition of the Greek women's association football national cup organized by the Hellenic Football Federation (HFF). AEK were the defending champions.

PAOK won their 8th title, beating Asteras Tripolis in the final.

== Schedule and format ==
The tournament will start in the first half of the season for the first time since the 2015–16 edition. Participation is mandatory for all top division clubs and optional for the rest.

In the first phase, teams from the second and third division will be split into ten (10) groups. The division of the teams into groups will take place based on geographical criteria, with exceptions for island clubs.

All ties are played in a single-match decider at the home ground of the lower division opponent. If both sides belong to the same tier, a draw will be held. In the quarterfinals and semifinals, ties will be played over two legs.

Round	Draw date	Match date	Fixtures	Clubs	Divisions entering this round
First round	3 October	15–29 October	13	23 → 10	11 B Division teams 12 C Division teams
Second round	31 October	12–19 November	7	14 → 8	4 A Division teams
Third round	20 November	10–17 December	8	16 → 8	8 A Division teams
Quarter-finals	18 December	14 January–4 February	8	8 → 4	None
Semi-finals	5 March	25 March–1 April	4	4 → 2	None
Final	5 March	24 May	1	2 → 1	None

== Preliminary round ==
During the draw held on 3 October 2025, all the teams from Chania were paired to play against each other to determine one winner who would qualify for the second round. Koakos Filinos and Stavros Kalithion were also drawn to play a preliminary match, with the winner advancing to face LFC Ialysou for a place in the second round.

15 October 2025	Halis Varypetrou	0–0 (2–3 p) (a.e.t.)	Poseidon Ladies	Varypetro, Chania
16:00		Report		Stadium: Gipedo Varypetrou; Referee: Vasileios Misailidis (Chania)

15 October 2025	Koakos Filinos	1–1 (2–4 p) (a.e.t.)	Stavros Kalithion	Kos
22:15	Trimmati 54' (pen.)	Report	Flevari 48'	Stadium: Palaio Stadio Antagoras; Referee: Apostolos Tzoumalakis (Dodecanese)

22 October 2025	Stilvi Chanion	0–8	AO Chania	Agia Marina, Chania
16:00		Report	Alberti 15'; Katoikou 20', 22', 85'; Fragkedi 32'; Solanaki 47'; Zdravkovic 50'; Sarikavazi 77'	Stadium: Gipedo Agia Marinas; Referee: Ioannis Damadakis (Chania)

== First round ==
The draw was completed by the HFF on 3 October 2025, at the federation's headquarters in Goudi, Athens.

15 October 2025	Anagennisi Alexandroupolis	0–8	Pontiakos Alexandroupolis	Alexandroupoli
16:00		Report	Marasli 2', 29', 56'; Karakatsani 7', 53', 55', 71'; Ioannidou 83'	Stadium: Gipedo KTEO; Referee: Athanasios Chandros (Evros)

15 October 2025	Vasilissa Tis Thrakis	3–0	Kavala 86	Feloni, Xanthi
16:00	Tonikidou 16', 41', 56'	Report		Stadium: Feloni Sports Center "Georgios Panidis"; Referee: Athanasios Lapatas (Thrace)

15 October 2025	Shooters WFC	0–5	Aris Thessalonikis	Pylaia, Thessaloniki
16:00		Report	Dafopoulou 4', 12', 50'; Savvidou 65'; Papadopoulou 80'	Stadium: "Antonis Karabourniotis" Pylaia Municipal Stadium; Referee: Evangelia Vragkou (Macedonia)

15 October 2025	PAS Giannina	0–2	Atlas Epirus	Ioannina
16:00		Report	Zannou 39'; Ferentinou 86'	Stadium: Gipedo Epirus FCA; Referee: Aikaterini Kyriazi (Epirus)

15 October 2025	Pyrgos	5–0	Feidon Argous	Pyrgos
16:00	McBroom 12', 42'; Giazatzidi 40', 45'; Llerena 67'	Report		Stadium: Pyrgos Stadium; Referee: Glykeria Papakonstantinou (Achaea)

15 October 2025	Pythagoras Peramatos	0–4	Fostiras Kaisarianis	Perama, Piraeus
16:00		Report	Kyriakidi 15', 38'; Gjata 66'; Skandalou 70'	Stadium: Perama Municipal Stadium; Referee: Ioannis Papagiannidis (East Attica)

15 October 2025	Irodotos	0–8	Nees Ergoteloi	Heraklion
16:00		Report	Nakayenze 43'; Tougli 44'; Simaiaki 53'; Papakonstanti 73', 76' (goal); Taore 83'; Lampraki 90'	Stadium: Nea Alikarnassos Municipal Stadium; Referee: Georgios Gigourtsis (Heraklion)

24 October 2025	Neos Syrou	0–6	Mykonos	Ano Syros, Syros
16:00		Report	Basouri 28', 32', 48'; Lusher 36'; Williams 39'; Sellavtzi 52'	Stadium: Municipal Stadium of Ano Syros

29 October 2025	AO Chania	3–0	Poseidon Ladies	Chania
15:00	Alberti 18', 58'; Katoikou 22'	Report		Stadium: Gipedo Minotavrou Mournion

29 October 2025	Stavros Kalithion	0–6	LFC Ialysou	Kalythies, Rhodes
20:00		Report	Konstantinou 46'; Kougiou 51', 72', 83'; Papadopoulou 57', 78'	Stadium: Kalythies Municipal Stadium

== Second round ==
The draw was completed by the HFF on 31 October 2025, at the federation's headquarters in Goudi, Athens.

12 November 2025	Vasilissa Tis Thrakis	0–2	Volos 2004	Feloni, Xanthi
15:00		Report	Nenne 53'; Sabo 78'	Stadium: Feloni Sports Center "Georgios Panidis"; Referee: Dimitrios Gkaitatzis (Drama)

12 November 2025	Pontiakos Alexandroupolis	0–1	Aris Thessalonikis	Alexandroupoli
15:00		Report	Iliadi 90+2' (pen.)	Stadium: "Fotis Kosmas" Municipal Stadium; Referee: Anastasia Mylopoulou (Kavala)

12 November 2025	Atlas Epirus	1–2	Trikala 2011	Ioannina
15:00	Varsani 57'	Report	Zheleva 47' (pen.); Katsigianni 67'	Stadium: Epirus Football Arena; Referee: Panagiotis Tsioris (Arta)

12 November 2025	Pyrgos	3–0	Nees Atromitou	Pyrgos
15:00	Llerena 45+1'; McBroom 55', 90+1'	Report		Stadium: Pyrgos Stadium; Referee: Despoina Kordali (Arcadia)

12 November 2025	LFC Ialysou	0–9	Odysseas Moschatou	Theologos, Rhodes
15:00		Report	McManus 18', 36'; Mpalntidi 20', 35', 79'; Mpoutla 42'; Papakosta 50', 75'; Ropoki 52'	Stadium: Gipedo Theologou; Referee: Savvas Katsidonis (Dodecanese)

13 November 2025	Mykonos	4–2	Nees Ergoteloi	Mykonos
15:30	Williams 26' (pen.); Preka 28', 89'; Armaou 86'	Report	Nakayenze 10', 90'	Stadium: Korfos Mykonos Municipal Stadium; Referee: Ioannis Roussos (Cyclades)

19 November 2025	AO Chania	2–3	Fostiras Kaisarianis	Chania
15:00	Asvesta 39'; Alberti 62'	Report	Prouba 20'; Chitou 59'; Somaraki 90+3'	Stadium: Monachi Elia Municipal Stadium; Referee: Anastasios Agaliotis (Rethymno)

== Third round ==
The draw was completed by the HFF on 20 November 2025.

10 December 2025	Fostiras Kaisarianis	0–1	Mykonos	Kaisariani, Athens
13:00		Report	Lusher 61'	Stadium: Kaisariani Municipal Stadium ″Michalis Kritikopoulos″ Referee: Anargyros Katsinis (East Attica)

10 December 2025	OFI	0–1	REA	Skafidaras, Heraklion
14:45		Report	Ruzafa 86'	Stadium: Vardinoyianneio Sports Center; Referee: Antonios Kouklakis (Chania)

10 December 2025	Pyrgos	0–2	Asteras Tripolis	Pyrgos
15:00		Report	Georgantzi 44' (pen.); Pitsiou 46'	Stadium: Pyrgos Stadium; Referee: Michail Triantafyllou (Argolida)

10 December 2025	Kifisia	0–1	Odysseas Moschatou	Kifisia, Athens
15:00		Report	Acuña 88'	Stadium: Kifisia Municipal Stadium ″Ioannis Zirinis″ Referee: Konstantinos Fotakos (Athens)

17 December 2025	AEK	1–0	Panathinaikos	Agioi Anargyroi, Athens
15:00	Chatzinikolaou 72'	Report		Stadium: Agioi Anargyroi Municipal Stadium; Referee: Efstratios Machairas (Athens)

17 December 2025	Trikala 2011	1–4	Agia Paraskevi	Trikala
15:00	Zheleva 42'	Report	Showers 11', 25'; Suarez 13', 37'	Stadium: Trikala Municipal Stadium; Referee: Konstantinos Pagonopoulos (Thessaly)

17 December 2025	Aris Thessalonikis	1–6	Volos	Evosmos, Thessaloniki
15:00	Dafopoulou 67'	Report	Garyfallidou 3', 34', 73', 87'; Reyes 23'; Tillett 43'	Stadium: Evosmos Municipal Stadium; Referee: Eirini Piggiou (Thesprotia)

17 December 2025	Volos 2004	0–3	PAOK	Volos
15:00		Report	Bataoula 17'; Gačanica 88', 90+1'	Stadium: Volos Municipal Stadium; Referee: Georgios Aslanidis (Pieria)

== Quarter–finals ==
The draw was completed by the HFF on 18 December 2025.

=== Summary ===
Team 1	Agg.	Team 2	1st leg	2nd leg
REA	1–5	Asteras Tripolis	1–0	0–5
Volos	3–5	AEK	2–3	1–2
Odysseas Moschatou	2–6	Agia Paraskevi	1–2	1–4
Mykonos	2–7	PAOK	1–6	1–1

=== Matches ===
14 January 2026
12:00

REA	1–0	Asteras Tripolis
Ruzafa 87'	Report

Rethymno Municipal Stadium, Rethymno
Referee: Emmanouil Mandalenakis (Heraklion)
4 February 2026
13:30

Asteras Tripolis	5–0	REA
Gkatsou 1'; Spyridonidou 32', 76'; Tzaferi 42'; Michail 66'	Report

Panarkadikos Stadium, Tripoli
Referee: Theodoros Maranos (Athens)

Asteras Tripolis won 6–1 on aggregate.

14 January 2026
15:00

Volos	2–3	AEK
Garyfallidou 22'; Bouzinou 77'	Report	Stefatou 22'; Violari 33'; Chatzinikolaou 83'

Olga Vasdeki Sports Center, Volos
Referee: Eirini Piggiou (Thesprotia)
4 February 2026
16:00

AEK	2–1	Volos
Larsson 63'; Chatzinikolaou 86'	Report	Garyfallidou 83'

Agioi Anargyroi Municipal Stadium, Agioi Anargyroi, Athens
Referee: Stefanos Xyrogiannis (Boeotia)

AEK won 5–3 on aggregate.

14 January 2026
15:00

Odysseas Moschatou	1–2	Agia Paraskevi
Georgakopoulou 82'	Report	Proimou 69'; Suarez 70'

Municipal Stadium of Moschato, Moschato, Athens
Referee: Leonidas Stavrou (East Attica)
4 February 2026
15:00

Agia Paraskevi	4–1	Odysseas Moschatou
Gkatsi 3'; Showers 20', 47'; Prapa 77'	Report	Mpalntidi 59'

Agia Paraskevi Municipal Stadium, Agia Paraskevi, Athens
Referee: Vasilis Lamprou (West Attica)

Agia Paraskevi won 6–2 on aggregate.

15 January 2026
14:15

Mykonos	1–6	PAOK
Lusher 55'	Report	Wiehe 27'; Kiourexidou 45+1'; Stiglmair 52', 77'; Gkizari 72'; Giannaka 80'

Korfos Municipal Stadium, Mykonos
Referee: Ioannis Roussos (Cyclades)
27 January 2026
11:00

PAOK	1–1	Mykonos
Vardali 72'	Report	Basouri 65'

Neoi Epivates Stadium, Neoi Epivates, Thessaloniki
Referee: Eirini Piggiou (Thesprotia)

PAOK won 7–2 on aggregate.

== Semi–finals ==
The draw was completed by the HFF on 5 March 2026.

=== Summary ===
Team 1	Agg.	Team 2	1st leg	2nd leg
PAOK	1–0	AEK	1–0	0–0
Agia Paraskevi	1–3	Asteras Tripolis	1–2	0–1

=== Matches ===
25 March 2026
16:00

PAOK	1–0	AEK
Wiehe 31'	Report

Neoi Epivates Stadium, Neoi Epivates, Thessaloniki
Referee: Dimitrios Kefalas (Serres)
1 April 2026
16:30

AEK	0–0	PAOK
	Report

Agioi Anargyroi Municipal Stadium, Agioi Anargyroi, Athens
Referee: Fotios Daoulas (West Attica)

PAOK won 1–0 on aggregate.

25 March 2026
16:00

Agia Paraskevi	1–2	Asteras Tripolis
Gkatsi 35'	Report	Gkatsou 71'; Melissou 81'

Agia Paraskevi Municipal Stadium, Agia Paraskevi, Athens
Referee: Konstantinos Andrianos (Achaea)
1 April 2026
16:30

Asteras Tripolis	1–0	Agia Paraskevi
Gkatsou 53'	Report

Panarkadikos Stadium, Tripoli
Referee: Eleni Antoniou (Achaea)

Asteras Tripolis won 3–1 on aggregate.

== Final ==
The final was played on 24 May 2026 at the Panetolikos Stadium in Agrinio. It was the first women's football match in Greece to use VAR.

24 May 2026
17:30 EEST

PAOK	2–0	Asteras Tripolis
Gkouni 33'; Tzourtzevits 87'	Report

Panetolikos Stadium, Agrinio
Referee: Alexandra Deligianni (Larissa)

GK	1	(Brazil) Dani Neuhaus
RB	14	(Greece) Vasiliki Giannaka
CB	5	(Greece) Maria Gkouni
CB	18	(Germany) Samantha Stiglmair
LB	17	(Greece) Maria Mitkou (c)
CM	7	(United States) Samantha Wiehe (substituted off) 83'
CM	23	(Greece) Eleftheria Drakogiannaki (substituted off) 83'
AM	8	(Spain) Marta Llopis
RW	70	(North Macedonia) Lenche Andreevska (substituted off) 90'
CF	24	(Bosnia and Herzegovina) Minela Gačanica
LW	22	(Greece) Panagiota Argyriou (substituted off) 71'
Substitutes:
GK	98	(Greece) Christina Margariti
DF	4	(Greece) Evmorfia Kiourexidou (substituted on) 83'
DF	6	(Greece) Natalia Giovani (substituted on) 90'
FW	9	(Greece) Electra Tzourtzevits (substituted on) 71' (yellow card) 88'
MF	10	(Greece) Thomai Vardali (substituted on) 83'
MF	11	(Greece) Nikoletta Kalesi
MF	13	(Greece) Eirini Askaridou
FW	19	(Greece) Foteini Mpouronikou
MF	77	(Greece) Ioli Stavropoulou
Manager:
(Greece) Panagiotis Patrikidis

GK	88	(Greece) Chrisoula Grigoriadou
RB	7	(Greece) Dimitra Proxenou
CB	5	(Greece) Anastasia Gkatsou (yellow card) 43'
CB	6	(Mexico) Jazmin Castañon
LB	99	(Greece) Ifigeneia Georgantzi
DM	13	(Colombia) Andrea Mendoza (substituted off) 83'
CM	8	(Greece) Efi Brame
CM	16	(Greece) Marianna Goula
RW	18	(Greece) Anastasia Tzaferi (substituted off) 59'
CF	11	(Greece) Anastasia Spyridonidou (c) (substituted off) 78'
LW	20	(Greece) Nikoleta Pitsiou (substituted off) 59'
Substitutes:
GK	24	(Greece) Maria Petropoulou
MF	2	(Greece) Eleni Papageorgiou
DF	4	(Greece) Ioanna Melissou (substituted on) 78'
FW	9	(Greece) Eirini Karagianni
FW	10	(Cyprus) Eirini Michail (substituted on) 59'
FW	14	(Greece) Markella Pastra
DF	17	(Latvia) Anastasija Ročāne
MF	21	(Greece) Eleftheria Dafermou (substituted on) 83'
FW	26	(United States) Nya Baccelli (substituted on) 59'
Manager:
(Slovakia) Martin Masaryk

Player of the Match:
Eleftheria Drakogiannaki (PAOK)

Assistant referees:
Maria Prassa (Athens)
Georgia Dimitriadou (Drama)
Fourth official:
Eirini Piggiou (Thesprotia)
Reserve assistant referee:
Sofia-Ioanna Rafailidi (Argolida)
Video assistant referee:
Eleni Antoniou (Achaea)
Assistant video assistant referee:
Angelos Evangelou (Athens)

== Top goalscorers ==
As of 24 May 2026

Rank	Player	Club	Goals
1	(Greece) Eleni Garyfallidou	Volos	6
2	(Canada) Kendall Showers	Agia Paraskevi	4
2	(Greece) Myrto Dafopoulou	Aris	4
2	(Greece) Despoina Katoikou	Chania	4
2	(Greece) Elpida Alberti	Chania	4
2	(Greece) Maria Basouri	Mykonos	4
2	(Greece) Domna Mpalntidi	Odysseas	4
2	(Greece) Christina Karakatsani	Pontiakos	4
2	(United States) Maggie McBroom	Pyrgos	4
