= Eleftheria Drakogiannaki =

Greek footballer (born 2001)

Personal information
- Date of birth: 3 November 2001 (age 24)
- Place of birth: Krousonas, Greece
- Height: 1.67 m (5 ft 6 in)
- Position: Midfielder

Team information
- Current team: PAOK FC
- Number: 23

Youth career
- 2011–2014: PAO Krousona

Senior career*
Years	Team	Apps	(Gls)
2014–2023	Ergotelis	83	(18)
2023–2024	OFI	23	(0)
2024–	PAOK	34	(0)

International career^{‡}
2019	Greece U19	3	(0)
2025–	Greece	5	(1)
- * Club domestic league appearances and goals as of 17 June 2026 ‡ National team caps and goals as of 17 June 2026

Eleftheria Drakogiannaki (Greek: Ελευθερία Δρακογιαννάκη, born 3 November 2001) is a Greek professional footballer who plays as a midfielder for PAOK in the Greek A Division and the Greece national team.

== Career ==
Eleftheria Drakogiannaki joined the academy of PAO Krousona in 2011 and was scouted by G.S. Ergotelis in 2014. She initially joined the club's reserve team, which competed in the Greek third tier. In September 2016, Nees Ergoteli, the club's first team competing in the Greek A Division, was dissolved, with G.S. Ergotelis assuming its place as the senior team. Over the following two seasons, Drakogiannaki helped the club secure back-to-back promotions to reach the top flight. During the 2017–18 season, she scored six goals in nine appearances. In her first season in the Greek A Division, she made 15 appearances, although Ergotelis were relegated at the end of the campaign. The club secured an immediate return to the top flight and remained there for the next three seasons before withdrawing from the league in 2023 due to financial difficulties. During that three-year spell, Ergotelis reached the championship play-offs twice, finishing fourth in 2021–22 and runners-up in 2022–23. Across those three top-flight seasons, Drakogiannaki made 28 appearances and scored four goals.

On 21 September 2023, she joined fellow Heraklion–based club OFI. She played a key role in the club's most successful season to date, as OFI finished runners-up in the league and reached the semifinals of the cup. In total, she made 25 appearances and scored two goals.

On 8 July 2024, Drakogiannaki signed for the defending champions PAOK. On 4 September 2024, she made her UWCL debut in a 2–1 victory against Kiryat Gat when she came on as a substitute for Markella Koskeridou in the 72nd minute. During the 2024–25 season, she made 17 appearances. She missed several matches towards the end of the campaign due to injury, including the Greek Cup semifinal, in which PAOK were eliminated by Panathinaikos. In the 2025–26 season, she made 22 appearances as PAOK won both the league title and the Greek Cup. She was named the final's Most Valuable Player, becoming the inaugural recipient of the award.

== International career ==
Eleftheria Drakogiannaki was called up to the Greece U19 team in October 2019 for the 2020 UEFA Women's Under-19 Championship qualification, making three appearances. She received her first call-up to the senior national team in June 2025 from head coach Alexandros Katikaridis for a friendly match against Belgium. She made her senior debut on 2 December 2025 in a friendly against Bosnia and Herzegovina. She scored her first international goal on 14 April 2026 in a 3–2 victory over the Faroe Islands during the 2027 FIFA Women's World Cup qualification.

== Career statistics ==
Appearances and goals by club, season and competition
Club	Season	League			National Cup		Continental		Total	
Club	Season	Division	Apps	Goals	Apps	Goals	Apps	Goals	Apps	Goals
Ergotelis	2014–15	Gamma Ethniki	?	?	—		—		?	?
Ergotelis	2015–16	Gamma Ethniki	9	1	—		—		9	1
Ergotelis	2016–17	Gamma Ethniki	5	2	—		—		5	2
Ergotelis	2017–18	Greek B Division	9	6	—		—		9	6
Ergotelis	2018–19	Greek A Division	15	0	—		—		15	0
Ergotelis	2019–20	Greek B Division	9	5	—		—		9	5
Ergotelis	2020–21	Greek A Division	8	3	—		—		8	3
Ergotelis	2021–22	Greek A Division	14	0	—		—		14	0
Ergotelis	2022–23	Greek A Division	?	1	—		—		?	1
Ergotelis	Total		83	18	—		—		83	18
OFI	2023–24	Greek A Division	23	0	2	2	—		25	2
PAOK	2024–25	Greek A Division	16	0	1	1	2	0	19	1
PAOK	2025–26	Greek A Division	18	0	4	0	—		22	0
PAOK	Total		34	0	5	1	2	0	41	1
Career Total			140	18	7	3	2	0	149	21

== Honours ==
Ergotelis

- Greek A Division; runner-up: 2022–23
- Greek B Division (2): 2017–18, 2019–20
- Gamma Ethniki: 2016–17; runner-up: 2015–16

OFI

- Greek A Division; runner-up: 2023–24

PAOK

- Greek A Division: 2025–26
- Greek Cup: 2025–26

Individual

- Greek Cup Final MVP: 2025–26
