= Konstantina Strantzali =

Greek footballer

Personal information
- Date of birth: 16 September 2001 (age 25)
- Height: 1.77 m (5 ft 10 in)
- Position: Midfielder

Youth career
- 2012–2017: PAOK

Senior career*
Years	Team	Apps	(Gls)
2017–2024	PAOK		
2024	OFI	0	(0)

International career
2020–2024	Greece	10	(0)
- * Club domestic league appearances and goals

Konstantina Strantzali (born 16 September 2001) is a Greek former footballer who played as a midfielder for PAOK, OFI and the Greece national team.

== Club career ==
In August 2024, she joined OFI before announcing her retirement a few months later.

== International career ==
Strantzali made her debut for the Greece national team on 27 October 2020, against Ukraine. She competed in the 2022 and 2025 UEFA Women's Euro qualifying, and the 2023 FIFA Women's World Cup qualification.

== Honours ==
PAOK

- Greek A Division (7): 2017/18, 2018/19, 2019/20, 2020/21, 2021/22, 2022/23, 2023/24
- Greek Cup: 2024
