= 2023–24 Greek A Division (women's football) =

35th season of top women's football (soccer) league in Greece

Greek A Division
- Season: 2023–24
- Dates: 1 October 2023 – 26 May 2024
- Champions: PAOK (19th title)
- Relegated: AEL; Olympiada Imittou; Seirines Grevenon; Volos 2004; Elpides Karditsas
- Women's Champions League: PAOK
- Matches: 182
- Goals: 546 (3 per match)
- Top goalscorer: Nikola Rybanská (24 goals)
- Biggest home win: Panathinaikos 12–0 Elpides Karditsas
- Biggest away win: AEL 0–9 PAOK
- Highest scoring: Panathinaikos 12–0 Elpides Karditsas
- Longest winning run: 19 games PAOK
- Longest unbeaten run: 25 games PAOK
- Longest winless run: 25 games Elpides Karditsas
- Longest losing run: 13 games Elpides Karditsas
- All statistics correct as of 26 May 2024.

The 2023–24 Greek A Division is the 35th season of the women's football top-level league in Greece. PAOK won their 10th consecutive title and their 19th overall.

== Format ==
Contrary to the previous seasons, the number of teams has been reduced to 14 and the championship will be held in one group instead of two. After the end of the season, the team that takes first place will be named champion of the Greek A Division for the 2023–24 season. The 5 teams that will occupy the last places will be relegated to the Greek B Division.

== Teams ==
=== Changes ===
Promoted from 2022 to 2023 Greek B Division	Relegated from 2022–23 Greek A Division
AEK; Asteras Tripolis; Nees Atromitou; Panathinaikos; Seirines Grevenon	Aris; Avantes Chalkida; Doxa Pigadakion; Ergotelis (withdrew); Ialysos; Leontikos; Odysseas

=== Stadiums and locations ===
Locations of the 2023–24 season clubs

Team	City	Stadium	Capacity
AEK Athens	Nea Filadelfeia	Sourmenon Football Stadium	
AEL	Larissa	Neapoli Stadium	2,000
Asteras Tripolis	Tripoli	Theodoros Kolokotronis Stadium	7,442
Elpides Karditsas	Karditsa	Municipal Stadium of Karditsa	6,000
Kastoria	Kastoria	Municipal Stadium of Kastoria	8,000
Nees Atromitou	Peristeri	Chorafa Municipal Stadium	600
OFI Crete	Heraklion	Vardinoyianneio Sports Center	1,000
Olympiada Imittou	Ymittos	Hymettus Municipal Stadium	1,000
Panathinaikos	Athens	Georgios Kalafatis Sports Center	200
PAOK	Thessaloniki	PAOK FC Sport Center, Neoi Epivates Stadium	
REA	Rethymno	Sohora Municipal Stadium	
Seirines Grevenon	Grevena	Grevena FCA Stadium	
Trikala 2011	Trikala	Trikala Municipal Stadium	15,000
Volos 2004	Volos	Volos Municipal Stadium	9,000

=== Personnel and sponsorship ===
Team	Head coach	Captain	Kit manufacturer	Main shirt sponsor
AEK Athens	(Greece) Nikos Kotsovos	(Greece) Christina Kollia	Macron	PhysiOsteoTeam
AEL	(Greece) Vasilis Panos	(Greece) Evi Kapareli	Macron	None
Asteras Tripolis	(Serbia) Dragan Knezevic	(Greece) Ioanna Melissou	Macron	Action 24
Elpides Karditsas	(Greece) Takis Koutsonasios	(Greece) Gogo Simou	Zeus	None
Kastoria	(Greece) Antonis Siskos	(Greece) Eleni Saich (Greece) Panagiota Vlasiadou	Acerbis	Brown Coffee, Ohmami
Nees Atromitou	(Greece) Kalomoira Kontomichi	(Greece) Lina Steropoulou	BNS	Amarillo, Minetta
OFI Crete	(Greece) Kostas Pantzaridis	(Greece) Vasso Kydonaki	Macron	Interwetten
Olympiada Imittou	(Greece) Kostantinos Stamelos	(Greece) Efrosini Xera	Kappa	None
Panathinaikos	(Greece) Dimitris Rouvalis	(Greece) Chara Dimitriou	Adidas	Pame Stoixima
PAOK	(Greece) Thalis Theodoridis	(Greece) Thomai Vardali	Macron	None
REA	(Greece) Stelios Kozanidis	(Greece) Eleftheria Dafermou	Macron	MANKA
Seirines Grevenon	(Greece) Christos Kalyvas	(Greece) Sia Aggelidou	3F, Macron	Alfa Wood Group
Trikala 2011	(Greece) Nikos Valomandras	(Greece) Konstantina Kostopoulou	Macron	14oz. Cafe, Theoni
Volos 2004	(Greece) Elena Kouskouni	(Greece) Olia Kekou	Givova, Playsports	Michanourgeio Koutsogianni, Carpit, Anassa, Valis Hotel

=== Managerial changes ===
Team	Outgoing manager	Date of vacancy	Position in table	Incoming manager	Date of appointment
OFI Crete	(Greece) Stamatis Mamantzakis	4 October 2023	–	(Greece) Kostas Pantzaridis	4 October 2023
Kastoria	(Greece) Kyrillos Kallimanis	28 November 2023	12th	(Greece) Petros Tsouklis	28 November 2023
AEK Athens	(Greece) Nikos Gkalitsios	17 December 2023	4th	(Greece) Nikos Kotsovos	19 December 2023
Panathinaikos	(Greece) Giannis Charalampidis	20 December 2023	2nd	(Greece) Dimitris Rouvalis	21 December 2023
REA	(Greece) Nikos Kyriakopoulos	21 December 2023	7th	(Greece) Stelios Kozanidis	23 December 2023
AEL	(Greece) Dimitris Vlachos	3 January 2024	12th	(Greece) Vasilis Panos	3 January 2024
Kastoria	(Greece) Petros Tsouklis	8 April 2024	10th	(Greece) Antonis Siskos	8 April 2024
Trikala 2011	(Greece) Giorgos Loules	11 April 2024	7th	(Greece) Nikos Valomandras	11 April 2024

== League table ==
Pos	Team	Pld	W	D	L	GF	GA	GD	Pts	Qualification or relegation
1	PAOK (C)	26	24	2	0	78	8	+70	74	Qualification for the Champions League qualifiers
2	OFI	26	20	2	4	53	17	+36	62	
3	Panathinaikos	26	19	3	4	77	17	+60	60	
4	Asteras Tripolis	26	13	8	5	52	21	+31	47	
5	REA	26	12	8	6	54	23	+31	44	
6	AEK	26	9	9	8	28	17	+11	36	
7	AO Trikala 2011	26	9	7	10	35	31	+4	34	
8	Kastoria GPO	26	9	6	11	33	37	−4	33	
9	Nees Atromitou	26	9	6	11	37	43	−6	33	
10	AEL (R)	26	7	7	12	24	45	−21	28	Relegation to Greek B Division
11	Olympiada Imittou (R)	26	6	4	16	27	57	−30	22	Relegation to Greek B Division
12	Seirines Grevenon (R)	26	5	4	17	18	58	−40	19	Relegation to Greek B Division
13	Volos 2004 (R)	26	4	4	18	24	73	−49	16	Relegation to Greek B Division
14	Elpides Karditsas (R)	26	0	2	24	6	99	−93	2	Relegation to Greek B Division

Rules for classification: 1) Points; 2) Head-to-head points; 3) Goal difference; 4) Number of goals scored; 5) Head-to-head goal difference; 6) Head-to-head away goals scored
(C) Champions; (R) Relegated

== Results ==
Home \ Away	AEK	AEL	AST	ELP	KAS	NEE	OFI	OLY	PAN	PAO	REA	SEI	TRI	VOL
AEK	—	0–0	2–0	5–0	0–0	2–0	0–1	1–0	1–1	2–2	1–1	5–0	1–1	1–1
AEL	2–0	—	1–1	2–1	0–1	2–0	1–0	2–2	0–2	0–9	0–0	2–1	0–1	0–1
Asteras Tripolis	0–2	1–0	—	6–0	2–1	5–2	1–1	6–1	0–0	0–2	1–1	1–0	0–0	5–0
Elpides Karditsas	0–2	2–2	0–4	—	0–2	1–4	0–4	0–1	0–2	0–6	0–3	1–3	0–3	0–0
Kastoria GPO	1–0	2–1	1–1	3–0	—	3–1	1–1	0–0	0–2	0–2	1–2	4–1	1–1	4–0
Nees Atromitou	0–0	1–0	0–0	6–0	2–2	—	0–2	1–1	0–4	1–2	0–5	2–1	3–1	1–1
OFI	1–0	5–0	0–1	2–0	1–0	2–0	—	5–0	2–1	0–1	1–0	4–2	3–2	4–0
Olympiada Imittos	0–2	3–2	0–4	3–0	0–3	2–3	1–3	—	2–3	0–3	1–3	0–0	3–1	3–2
Panathinaikos	2–0	4–0	1–2	12–0	5–2	1–0	0–1	5–2	—	1–1	3–1	6–0	5–0	3–0
PAOK	1–0	3–0	3–0	2–0	6–0	2–1	3–0	1–0	3–2	—	2–0	8–0	2–1	5–0
REA	1–0	1–1	2–2	8–1	3–0	2–2	1–3	4–0	0–1	0–1	—	3–0	2–1	3–0
Seirines Grevenon	2–0	0–1	0–4	1–0	2–0	1–2	0–3	2–0	0–3	0–3	1–1	—	0–0	0–1
AO Trikala 2011	0–0	2–2	1–0	7–0	2–0	0–2	0–1	1–0	0–1	0–1	0–0	3–0	—	4–3
Volos 2004	0–1	2–3	0–5	6–0	2–1	1–3	2–3	0–2	0–7	0–4	0–7	1–1	1–3	—

Legend: Blue = home team win; Yellow = draw; Red = away team win.

== Season statistics ==
=== Top scorers ===
As of 26 May 2024

Rank	Player	Club	Goals
1	(Slovakia) Nikola Rybanská	OFI	24
2	(Sweden) Emelie Helmvall	PAOK	23
3	(Greece) Anastasia Spyridonidou	Panathinaikos	21
4	(Portugal) Tânia Mateus	REA	15
5	(Greece) Vasiliki Moskofidou	Asteras Tripolis	13
6	(Kenya) Christine Nafula	Kastoria	12
7	(Greece) Antigoni Papadopoulou	PAOK	11
8	(Bulgaria) Leonora Zheleva	AEL	10
8	(Pakistan) Aqsa Mushtaq	OFI	10

== Awards ==
=== Best Greek Player ===
Winner	Club	Nominees	Source
Maria Mitkou	PAOK	Vasia Giannaka; Georgia Chalatsogianni	

=== Best Foreign Player ===
Winner	Club	Nominees	Source
(Slovakia) Nikola Rybanská	OFI	(Sweden) Emelie Helmvall (Slovakia) Victoria Kaláberová	

=== Best Goalkeeper ===
Winner	Club	Nominees	Source
(Brazil) Dani Neuhaus	PAOK	(Austria) Andrea Gurtner (Greece) Zoi Nasi	

=== Best Young Player ===
Winner	Club	Nominees	Source
(Greece) Georgia Chalatsogianni	PAOK	Vasia Giannaka; Maria Gkouni	

=== Top Scorer ===
Winner	Club	Goals	Source
(Slovakia) Nikola Rybanská	OFI	24	

=== Best Coach ===
Winner	Club	Nominees	Source
(Greece) Thalis Theodoridis	PAOK	Stelios Kozanidis; Kostas Pantzaridis	

=== Best Greek Female Player Abroad ===
Winner	Club	Nominees	Source
Veatriki Sarri	(England) Brighton & Hove Albion	Sophia Koggouli; Maria Palama	

=== Team of the Season ===
PSAPP Best XI
Goalkeeper	(Brazil) Dani Neuhaus (PAOK)			
Defenders	(Greece) Maria Paterna (OFI)	(Greece) Anastasia Gkatsou (REA)	(Greece) Maria Gkouni (PAOK)	(Greece) Maria Mitkou (PAOK)
Midfielders	(Greece) Georgia Chalatsogianni (PAOK)		(Greece) Vasia Giannaka (PAOK)	(Slovenia) Manja Rogan (Panathinaikos)
Forwards	(Haiti) Chelsea Domond (Panathinaikos)		(Slovakia) Nikola Rybanská (OFI)	(Sweden) Emelie Helmvall (PAOK)
