= Electra Tzourtzevits =

Greek footballer (born 2007)

Electra Tzourtzevits Електра Ђурђевић
Personal information
- Date of birth: 5 January 2007 (age 19)
- Place of birth: Thessaloniki, Greece
- Height: 1.72 m (5 ft 8 in)
- Position: Forward

Team information
- Current team: Panathinaikos

Youth career
- 2017–2021: Mentekas Kalamarias
- 2021–2023: PAOK

Senior career*
Years	Team	Apps	(Gls)
2023–2026	PAOK	55	(10)
2026–	Panathinaikos	1	(0)

International career^{‡}
2022–2024	Greece U17	11	(1)
2024–	Greece U19	17	(2)
2025–	Greece	5	(1)
- * Club domestic league appearances and goals as of 20 September 2026 ‡ National team caps and goals as of 20 June 2026

Electra Tzourtzevits (Greek: Ηλέκτρα Τζούρτζεβιτς-Serbian Cyrillic: Електра Ђурђевић, born 5 January 2007 in Thessaloniki) is a Greek footballer who plays as a forward for Panathinaikos in the Greek A Division and for the Greece national team.

== Career ==
Electra Tzourtzevits began playing football in the academy of Mentekas Kalamarias, where she spent four years and also made appearances for the senior team, which competed in the second and third tiers of Greek women's football. In 2021, she joined the academy of PAOK. During the 2023–24 season, she made 17 appearances, primarily as a substitute, and scored her first goal for the club in the final league match of the campaign against Asteras Tripolis. PAOK were crowned league and cup champions. In the 2024–25 season, Tzourtzevits scored six goals in 21 appearances, although PAOK finished fifth in the league and were eliminated in the semifinals of the cup. In the 2025–26 season, she made 24 appearances in all competitions, scoring five goals, including one in the Greek Cup final against Asteras Tripolis, and provided three assists. She helped PAOK complete an unbeaten domestic double.

On 15 September 2026, she signed for Panathinaikos.

== International career ==
Electra Tzourtzevits was first called up to the Greece under-17 national team in September 2022 for two friendly matches against Slovakia. She also represented Greece in the 2024 UEFA Women's Under-17 Championship qualification, scoring against Denmark. In November 2024, she received her first call-up to the under-19 national team for the 2025 UEFA Women's Under-19 Championship qualification. As of 2026, she has made 17 appearances for the under-19 team, scoring twice, against Romania during the 2025 qualification and against Austria during the 2026 qualification.

Tzourtzevits received her first call-up to the senior team in November 2025 from head coach Vasilis Spertos for two friendly matches. She made her debut against Belarus, coming on as an 85th-minute substitute for Veatriki Sarri. She scored her first international goal in a 3–0 victory over Georgia during the 2027 FIFA Women's World Cup qualification.

== Personal life ==
Electra is the daughter of Serbian former professional footballer Milan Đurđević who also played for PAOK from 1991 to 1993.

== Honours ==
PAOK

- Greek A Division (2): 2023–24, 2025–26
- Greek Cup (2): 2024,2025–26
