= Maria Gkouni =

Greek footballer (born 2004)

Personal information
- Full name: Maria Gkouni-Papaioannou
- Date of birth: 26 September 2004 (age 22)
- Place of birth: Leros, Greece
- Height: 1.72 m (5 ft 8 in)
- Position: Centre-back

Team information
- Current team: PAOK
- Number: 5

Youth career
- 2011–2014: Olympiacos Lerou
- 2015–2017: Ethnikos Neas Makris

Senior career*
Years	Team	Apps	(Gls)
2017–2020	AO Vrilission		
2020–2022	Olympiada Imittou		
2022–	PAOK	86	(7)

International career^{‡}
2021–2023	Greece U19	11	(3)
2024–	Greece	15	(0)
- * Club domestic league appearances and goals as of 26 May 2026 ‡ National team caps and goals as of 26 May 2026

Maria Gkouni-Papaioannou (Greek: Μαρία Γκούνη-Παπαϊωάννου; born 26 September 2004) is a Greek footballer who plays as a defender for PAOK in the Greek A Division and for the Greek national team.

== Club career ==
At the age of 8, she started playing football in a boys' academy in Leros. In 2014, her family moved to Beijing for a year. After her return to Greece, she joined the Ethnikos academy in Nea Makri, which she left at the age of 12 in search of a women's team. In 2017, she joined Greek B Division club AO Vrilission. She helped them reach the final of the 2019 Greek Women's U17 Cup.

On 31 August 2020, Gkouni joined A Division club Olympiada Imittou. They finished 4th in their group in the 2020–21 season and 5th in 2021–22.

On 1 July 2022, she joined Greek champions PAOK. She made her UWCL debut on August 18 against Swansea City. She immediately broke into the starting XI with 20 league appearances in her first season as her club won the league. In the 2022 PSAT Sports Awards, she represented her team as they were given an honorary award for their many titles. In the 2023–24 season, she made 30 total appearances and scored 3 goals as PAOK won the double. In the 2024/25 season, she made 23 appearances and scored a goal in the quarter-finals of the Greek Cup against Asteras Tripolis. PAOK finished in 5th place in the league and only reached the semifinals of the cup. She was included in the Best XI of the season at the 2024 and 2025 PSAPP Awards, while also being nominated for Best Young Player of the 2023–24 season. In the 2025–26 season, Gkouni made 26 appearances and scored 3 goals, including one in the final of the 2025–26 Greek Cup against Asteras Tripolis, which PAOK ultimately won 2–0. The club also won the league, completing the domestic double undefeated.

== International career ==
She made her Under-19 National Team debut on 20 October 2021, scoring twice in a comprehensive 7–0 win over Kazakhstan in the UEFA Women's Under-19 Championship.

She was called up to the Women's National Team for the first time ahead of the friendly matches against Romania and Turkey in February 2024, making her debut on the 22nd of the month against the former.

== Honours ==
=== Club ===
AO Vrilission

- Greek U17 Cup; runner-up: 2019

PAOK

- Greek A Division (3): 2022–23, 2023–24, 2025–26
- Greek Cup (2): 2024, 2025–26

=== Individual ===
- PSAPP Best XI (3): 2023–24, 2024–25, 2025–26
