= Sofia Pelekouda =

Greek footballer

Personal information
- Full name: Sofia Pelekouda
- Date of birth: 22 September 1994 (age 32)
- Place of birth: Volos, Greece
- Position: Defender

Team information
- Current team: Nees Atromitou

Youth career
- 2004–2009: Volos 2004

Senior career*
| Years | Team | Apps | (Gls) |
| 2009–2012 | Volos 2004 | | |
| 2012–2013 | Elpides Karditsas | | |
| 2013–2015 | Amazones Dramas | | |
| 2015–2016 | PAOK | | |
| 2016–2019 | Giannena WFC | | |
| 2019–2022 | Aris Thessaloniki | | |
| 2022–2023 | Shooters WFC | | |
| 2023–2024 | Roma CF | | |
| 2024–2025 | Nees Atromitou | | |
| 2025– | Olympiacos | 12 | (10) |

International career^{‡}
| 2010–2016 | Greece U17 | 3 | (0) |
| 2012–2013 | Greece U19 | 5 | (0) |
| 2013– | Greece | 5 | (1) |
- * Club domestic league appearances and goals as of 18:53, 3 April 2015 (UTC) ‡ National team caps and goals as of 13 August 2024

Sofia Pelekouda (born 22 September 1994) is a Greek footballer who currently plays as a defender for Olympiacos in the Women's Gamma Ethniki.

== Honours ==
Volos 2004

- Greek A Division; runner-up: 2009/10, 2010/11

Amazones Dramas

- Greek A Division (1): 2013/14
- Greek Cup; runner-up: 2014

PAOK

- Greek A Division (1): 2015/2016
- Greek Cup (1): 2016

Giannena

- Greek B Division (1): 2017/18

Aris Thessalonikis

- Greek A Division; runner-up: 2019/20

Olympiacos

- Gamma Ethniki (1): 2025/26
