= Georgia Chalatsogianni =

Greek footballer

Personal information
- Full name: Georgia Chalatsogianni
- Date of birth: 4 April 2005 (age 21)
- Place of birth: Thessaloniki, Greece
- Height: 1.68 m (5 ft 6 in)
- Position: Midfielder

Team information
- Current team: BSC YB Frauen

Youth career
- 2018–2019: Leontes Thessalonikis

Senior career*
Years	Team	Apps	(Gls)
2019–2021	Leontes Thessalonikis	3	(3)
2021–2025	PAOK	58	(19)
2025–	Young Boys	21	(0)

International career^{‡}
2021–2022	Greece U17	4	(0)
2022–2023	Greece U19	10	(2)
2022–	Greece	17	(0)
- * Club domestic league appearances and goals as of 3 June 2026 ‡ National team caps and goals as of 3 June 2026

Georgia Chalatsogianni (born 4 April 2005) is a Greek footballer currently playing as a midfielder for BSC Young Boys in the Swiss Super League and the Greek national team.

== Club career ==
PAOK signed Georgia Chalatsogianni on October 1, 2021, from the Leontes academy in Thessaloniki, with which she had won the 2019–20 third division. In her first season at the club, they went unbeaten in the league, winning their 8th consecutive title. On 17 July 2022, she renewed her contract for another season and one month later she made her Champions League debut against Swansea City. In the 2022–23 season, she helped them win the league again with 7 goals in 18 appearances and was voted by PSAPP as the best young player of the season. In the 2023–24 season, Georgia scored 6 goals in 29 total appearances as PAOK won the double unbeaten. She missed most of the 2024–25 season after getting an ACL injury during an international match against Montenegro. She made a full recovery by late April and returned to make 6 appearances.

On 21 July 2025, Chalatsogianni signed for Swiss club BSC Young Boys. She made her Europa Cup debut against SFK 2000 on 8 October 2025 where she scored a penalty in the 83rd minute. She made 29 appearances in all competitions as the club reached the finals of the Swiss Super League and of the Swiss Cup, both of which it ultimately lost to Servette.

== International career ==
Chalatsogianni captained both the U17 and U19 national teams. On 11 November 2024, she made her senior debut in a friendly match against Cyprus. She has also made appearances in the Nations League and Euro qualifying.

== International goals ==
No.	Date	Venue	Opponent	Score	Result	Competition
1.	9 June 2026	Mikheil Meskhi Stadium, Tbilisi, Georgia	Georgia	1–0	3–2	2027 FIFA Women's World Cup qualification

== Career statistics ==
As of 3 June 2026

Appearances and goals by club, season and competition
Club	Season	League			National Cup (Note: Includes Greek Cup and Swiss Cup)		Continental (Note: Includes UEFA Women's Champions League and UEFA Women's Europa Cup)		Total	
Club	Season	Division	Apps	Goals	Apps	Goals	Apps	Goals	Apps	Goals
Leontes Thessalonikis	2019–20	Gamma Ethniki	3	3	–		–		3	3
PAOK	2021–22	Greek A Division	15	7	–		–		15	7
PAOK	2022–23	Greek A Division	18	7	–		2	0	20	7
PAOK	2023–24	Greek A Division	22	5	5	1	2	0	29	6
PAOK	2024–25	Greek A Division	3	0	3	0	0	0	6	0
PAOK	Total		58	19	8	1	4	0	70	20
Young Boys	2025–26	Swiss Super League	21	0	4	1	4	1	29	2
Career Total			82	22	12	2	8	1	102	25

== Honours ==
=== Club ===
Leontes Thessalonikis

- Gamma Ethniki: 2019–20

PAOK

- Greek A Division (3): 2021–22, 2022–23, 2023–24
- Greek Cup: 2024

=== Individual ===
- PSAPP Best Young Player: 2022–23, 2023–24
- PSAPP Best XI: 2023–24
