= Antigoni Papadopoulou (footballer) =

Greek footballer

Personal information
- Date of birth: 17 December 2003 (age 22)
- Place of birth: Thessaloniki, Greece
- Height: 1.78 m (5 ft 10 in)
- Position: Striker

Team information
- Current team: Panathinaikos

Senior career*
Years	Team	Apps	(Gls)
2020–2021	Kastoria		
2021–2022	PAOK B		
2022–2023	Aris Thessalonikis		
2023–2025	PAOK	39	(17)
2025–2026	Omonia	15	(8)
2026–	Panathinaikos	1	(0)

International career^{‡}
2023–	Greece	10	(3)
- * Club domestic league appearances and goals as of 20 September 2026 ‡ National team caps and goals as of 4 June 2025

Antigoni Papadopoulou (born 17 December 2003) is a Greek footballer who plays as a forward for Panathinaikos in the Greek A Division and the Greece women's national team.

== Club career ==
She started her career with GPO Kastoria in the Greek A Division during the 2020–21 season. She made her first appearances in the Greek top tier as her club finished 9th in their group, avoiding relegation.

On 29 June 2021, Papadopoulou signed with Greek champions PAOK for the first time. She made her Champions League debut against Agarista on August 18 and contributed a goal and an assist. She made appearances for PAOK's B team before leaving at the end of the season

In the 2022–23 season, she competed for Aris Thessalonikis and, on 3 July 2023, she returned to PAOK where she had a breakout season, scoring 16 goals in 32 matches, mostly coming off the bench. PAOK won both the league and the 2024 Greek Cup, with Papadopoulou scoring in the final. In 2024–25, she scored eight goals in 20 appearances as PAOK finished 5th in the league and reached the semifinals of the cup.

On 26 September 2025, she moved to Cyprus to join Omonia. She made her debut in the 2025 Cypriot Super Cup final, helping the club win the competition for the first time in its history. She made 18 total appearances and scored eight times as Omonia finished third in the league.

== International goals ==
No.	Date	Venue	Opponent	Score	Result	Competition
1.	12 July 2024	Theodoros Vardinogiannis Stadium, Heraklion, Greece	Andorra	4–0	6–0	2025 UEFA Women's Euro qualifying
2.	12 July 2024	Theodoros Vardinogiannis Stadium, Heraklion, Greece	Andorra	5–0	6–0	2025 UEFA Women's Euro qualifying
3.	12 July 2024	Theodoros Vardinogiannis Stadium, Heraklion, Greece	Andorra	6–0	6–0	2025 UEFA Women's Euro qualifying

== Honours ==
PAOK B

- Junior Macedonia FCA Championship U-16: 2021–22

PAOK

- Greek A Division: 2023–24
- Greek Cup: 2024

Omonia

- Cypriot Super Cup: 2025
