= Emelie Helmvall =

Swedish footballer (born 1993)

Personal information
- Full name: Åsa Emelie Helmvall
- Date of birth: 12 July 1993 (age 33)
- Place of birth: Luleå, Sweden
- Height: 1.65 m (5 ft 5 in)
- Position: Forward

Team information
- Current team: Panathinaikos

Senior career*
Years	Team	Apps	(Gls)
2010	Infjärdens	3	(1)
2010	Notvikens	12	(3)
2010–2012	Piteå	9	(1)
2012	Assi	10	(2)
2012–2015	Alviks	24	(15)
2015–2017	Halmia	7	(4)
2017–2019	Assi	63	(23)
2019–2020	Fart	10	(2)
2020–2021	Pink Bari	27	(7)
2021–2022	Sampdoria	18	(2)
2022–2023	Apollon Limassol	26	(38)
2023–2025	PAOK	28	(24)
2025	Panathinaikos	0	(0)
- * Club domestic league appearances and goals as of 18 May 2026

Emelie Helmvall (born 12 July 1993) is a Swedish professional footballer who has played as a forward for club in Sweden, Norway, Italy, Cyprus and, recently, Greece.

== Career statistics ==
As of 7 June 2025

Appearances and goals by club, season and competition
Club	Season	League			National cup (Note: Includes Svenska Cupen, Coppa Italia, Cypriot Cup, Greek Cup)		Europe (Note: Includes UEFA Women's Champions League)		Total	
Club	Season	Division	Apps	Goals	Apps	Goals	Apps	Goals	Apps	Goals
Infjärdens SK	2010	Division 2	3	1	–		–		3	1
Notvikens IK	2010	Division 2	9	2	3	1	–		12	3
Piteå IF	2010	Division 1	6	0	–		–		6	0
Piteå IF	2011	Damallsvenskan	2	0	1	1	–		3	1
Piteå IF	Total		8	0	1	1	–		9	1
Assi IF	2012	Division 1	10	2	–		–		10	2
Alviks IK	2012	Division 2			–		–			
Alviks IK	2013	Division 1			–		–			
Alviks IK	2014	Division 1	17	10	2	1	–		19	11
Alviks IK	2015	Division 1	4	4	1	0	–		5	4
Alviks IK	Total		21	14	3	1	–		24	15
IS Halmia	2015	Division 1	7	4	–		–		7	4
IS Halmia	2016	Division 1			–		–			
IS Halmia	Total		7	4	–		–		7	4
Assi IF	2017	Elitettan	25	7	–		–		25	7
Assi IF	2018	Elitettan	23	10	–		–		23	10
Assi IF	2019	Elitettan	15	6	–		–		15	6
Assi IF	Total		63	23	–		–		63	23
FL Fart	2019	Toppserien	10	2	–		–		10	2
ASD Pink Sport Time	2019–20	Serie A	3	0	–		–		3	0
ASD Pink Sport Time	2020–21	Serie A	22	6	2	1	–		24	7
ASD Pink Sport Time	Total		25	6	2	1	–		27	7
Sampdoria	2021–22	Serie A	14	1	4	1	–		18	2
Apollon Ladies FC	2022–23	Cypriot First Division	21	37	3	1	2	0	26	38
PAOK FC	2023–24	Greek A Division	25	23	3	0	2	4	30	27
PAOK FC	2024–25	Greek A Division	3	1	0	0	2	1	5	2
PAOK FC	Total		28	24	3	0	4	5	35	29
Career total			224	112	18	6	6	5	248	123

== Honours ==
=== Club ===
Piteå IF

- Division 1 Norrettan: 2010

Apollon FC

- Cypriot First Division: 2022/23
- Cypriot Cup: 2022/23

PAOK

- Greek A Division: 2023/24
- Greek Cup: 2024

=== Individual ===
- PASP Top Scorer: 2022/23
- PASP Best11 Women's: 2022/23
- PSAPP Best XI: 2023–24
