= Marina Ewodo =

French-Cameroonian basketball player

Tarbes Gespe Bigorre
- League: Ligue Féminine de Basketball

Personal information
- Born: June 24, 1998 (age 28) Pau, France
- Listed height: 6 ft 2 in (1.88 m)

Career information
- High school: LJ Mermoz Montpellier HS
- College: UC Riverside Highlanders
- NBA draft: 2020: undrafted
- Playing career: 2020–present

Career history
- 2020-2022: Saint-Amand Hainaut Basket
- 2022-2023: PAS Giannina WBC
- 2023-2024: CD Zamarat
- 2024-2025: Tarbes Gespe Bigorre
Medals
Women's basketball
Representing Cameroon
AfroBasket
Bronze medal – third place	2021 Cameroon

Marina Paule Ewodo (born June 24, 1998) is a French-Cameroonian basketball player. She plays for PAS Giannina WBC in Greek Women's Basketball League and the Cameroon national basketball team.

== High school ==
Marina attended LJ Mermoz Montpellier High School. She won the Champion of France in School Sport 2014 and Vice Champion of French Championship 2016.

== College career ==
She played college basketball for the UC Riverside Highlanders, in her first year, she averaged 2 points, 1.6 assists and 1.3 rebounds. She had a game high of 11 points against UC Irvine Anteaters. In her second year in the 2017–18 Season, she averaged 5.6 points, 2.2 assists and 5.4 rebounds. In her third year, she averaged 11.9 points, 2.9 assists and 6.9 rebounds during the 2018–19 season. In her final season, She averaged 10.9 points, 2.2 assists and 8.2 rebounds during the 2018–19 season.

== Professional career ==
Marina plays for the Saint-Amand Hainaut Basket in France.She participated in the 2021 EuroCup Women where she averaged 2 points, 0.7 rebounds and 0.3 assists. She averaged 2.2 points, 1.6 rebounds and 0.3 assists in the 2020–21 Ligue Féminine de Basketball season.

Marina transferred to PAS Giannina WBC in Greek Women's Basketball League.

== Cameroonian National Women's Basketball team ==
Marina represented the Cameroon national basketball team at the 2021 Women's Afrobasket. She averaged 8.6 points, 4.4 rebounds and 1.4 assists. She was named in the Tournaments All Star squad.

== Personal life ==
Marina is the daughter of former Cameroonian Basketball player Narcisse Ewodo. Her younger Sister Yohana Isabelle Ewodo plays youth basketball for the French team.
