= Hymn of PAS Giannina =

Anthem

The Hymn of PAS Giannina or Άγιαξ της Ηπείρου (Ajax of Epirus) is the anthem of the Greek multi-sport club PAS Giannina, based in Epirus. The lyrics were written in the beginning of 70s by the Greek songwriter Alekos Kitsakis.

Historically, the first hymn of PAS Giannina was composed by Alekos Kitsakis (lyrics and music). It was a march-style anthem and more oriented to football matches.

In 2017, Mr. Christovasilis, addressed the Epirote singer Giannis Kapsalis (son of the clarinetist Stavros Kapsalis) who is a worthy follower of folk music and adores PAS Giannina to create a new anthem.
