= 2021 Nigeria Women's Cup =

2021 Aiteo Cup (women)
Nigeria Women's Cup

Tournament details
- Country: Nigeria
- Dates: 4 July – 8 August 2021

Final positions
- Champions: Bayelsa Queens (1st title)

Tournament statistics
- Matches played: 18
- Goals scored: 70 (3.89 per match)
- All statistics correct as of 8 August 2021.

The 2021 Nigeria Women's Cup (known as the 2021 Aiteo Women's Cup for sponsorship reasons) was the 27th edition of the Nigeria Women's Cup, the main knockout tournament for women's football in Nigeria.

Bayelsa Queens won their first Aiteo Cup after defeating Robo Queens 4–2 at the final after they had lost the previous six finals they played in. This also marked the first and only time two clubs from the same state won the Aiteo cup at both the men and women's edition in the same season as Bayelsa United also won the men's edition.

Nasarawa Amazons were the defending champions but were eliminated by Robo Queens at the quarterfinals.

== Format ==
20 clubs from 19 states plus the FCT entered the tournament.

The first round involves the 8 lowest placed clubs, the winners then proceed to the second round where they join the remaining 12 clubs.

Matches are played 90 minutes, tied fixtures goes straight to a penalty shoot-out.

== First round ==
Eight clubs participated in this round. All matches were played on 4 July.

Team 1	Score	Team 2
Tin City Queens (PLA)	1–5	Naija Ratels (BEN)
Beautiful Tours Angels (FCT)	0–6	Sunshine Queens (OND)
Delta Queens (DEL)	9–0	Kada Queens (KAD)
Bright Future FC (ENU)	1–1 (5–4 p)	Dakkada Queens (AKW)

== Second round ==
Sixteen clubs participated in this round, the four winners from the first round and the remaining 12 clubs. Matches were played on 8 July.

Team 1	Score	Team 2
Nasarawa Amazons (NAS)	6–0	Ekiti Queens (EKT)
Robo Queens (LAG)	2–0	Confluence Queens (KOG)
Naija Ratels (BEN)	1–1 (1–4 p)	Edo Queens (EDO)
Sunshine Queens (OND)	0–5	Osun Babes (OSU)
Heartland Queens (IMO)	0–5	Delta Queens (DEL)
Pelican Stars (CRV)	0–4	Bayelsa Queens (BAY)
Bright Future FC (ENU)	1–0	Abia Angels (ABI)
Kwara Ladies (KWA)	w/o	Rivers Angels (RIV)

== Quarter-finals ==
The eight winners from the second round were pitted against each other.

Team 1	Score	Team 2
11 July 2021
Delta Queens (DEL)	0–2	Bayelsa Queens (BAY)
Nasarawa Amazons (NAS)	1–1 (2–3 p)	Robo Queens (LAG)
Edo Queens (EDO)	1–1 (4–3 p)	Osun Babes (OSU)
16 July 2021
Bright Future FC (ENU)	0–5	Rivers Angels (RIV)

== Semi-finals ==
Bayelsa Queens qualified for their seventh cup final (of which they had won none) as they inflicted on Rivers Angels their heaviest defeat in its club's history. Robo Queens also reached their first Aiteo cup final as they defeated Edo Queens on penalty-shootout.

Team 1	Score	Team 2
18 July 2021
Bayelsa Queens (BAY)	5–0	Rivers Angels (RIV)
19 July 2021
Robo Queens (LAG)	0–0 (5–3 p)	Edo Queens (EDO)

18 July	Bayelsa Queens	5–0	Rivers Angels	Godswill Akpabio Stadium Training Pitch, Uyo
14:00	Efih 20', 37' Anjor 26' Sunday 43', 48'	Report

19 July	Robo Queens	0–0 (5–3 p)	Edo Queens	FIFA Goal Project Pitch, Abuja
		Report

== Final ==
The final was played on 8 August at the Samuel Ogbemudia Stadium in Benin City. It was shown live before the men's final which was played later that day.

Team 1	Score	Team 2
Robo Queens (LAG)	2–4	Bayelsa Queens (BAY)

8 August	Robo Queens	2–4	Bayelsa Queens	Samuel Ogbemudia Stadium, Benin City
16:00	Monday 19'; Akinwande 65'; Oguchi (red card) 77'	Report	Anjor 10'; Sunday 37'; Efih 43'; Bokiri 74'

2021 Aiteo Cup (women) winners

1st title

== Awards ==
Award	Winner	Club
Player of the Tournament	(Nigeria) Anjor Mary	Bayelsa Queens
Golden Boot	(Nigeria) Anjor Mary	Bayelsa Queens
