= 2022–23 Greek A Division (women's football) =

34th season of top women's football (soccer) league in Greece

Greek A Division
- Season: 2022–23
- Dates: 20 November 2022 – 28 May 2023
- Champions: PAOK; 18th title
- Relegated: Aris; Avantes Chalkida; Doxa Pigadakia; Ialysos; Leontikos; Odysseas
- Women's Champions League: PAOK
- Matches: 148
- Goals: 500 (3.38 per match)
- Top goalscorer: Kiyani Johnson (19 goals)
- Biggest home win: Ergotelis 10–0 Doxa Pigadakia; Ergotelis 10–0 Ialysos
- Biggest away win: Elpides Karditsas 0–8 Trikala; Avantes Chalkida 0–8 PAOK
- Highest scoring: Ergotelis 10–0 Doxa Pigadakia; Ergotelis 10–0 Ialysos
- Longest winning run: 18 games PAOK
- Longest unbeaten run: 18 games PAOK
- Longest winless run: 14 games Avantes Chalkida
- Longest losing run: 14 games Avantes Chalkida
- All statistics correct as of 1 August 2023.

The 2022–23 Greek A Division was the 34th season of the women's football top-level league in Greece. PAOK won their 9th consecutive title and their 18th overall.

== Format ==
The Greek A Division for the 2022–23 season was held in two groups of eight teams. The teams' groups were decided by geographical criteria.

The league was in two phases: a regular season followed by a play-off round. The top three teams in each group after the regular season progressed to the play-offs.

At the end of the season, six teams were relegated to the Greek B Division, four directly and two after play-out matches.

== Team changes ==
Promoted from 2021 to 2022 Greek B Division	Relegated from 2021–22 Greek A Division
Doxa Pigadakia; Leontikos; Trianton Ialysos; Volos	AEK Mesologgiou; Agia Paraskevi; Agrotikos Asteras; Doxa 2016; Feidon Argos; Giannena

== First phase ==
=== Group 1 ===
==== Teams ====
Locations of the 2022–23 season Group 1 clubs

Team	City	Stadium	Capacity
Aris Thessaloniki	Thessaloniki	Mikra Stadium	1,000
Avantes Chalkida	Chalcis	Municipal Football Stadium of Avlida	2,000
Elpides Karditsas	Karditsa	Municipal Stadium of Karditsa	6,000
Kastoria	Kastoria	Municipal Stadium of Kastoria	8,000
AEL	Larissa	Alcazar Stadium	13,108
PAOK	Thessaloniki	Toumba Stadium	28,703
Trikala 2011	Trikala	Trikala Municipal Stadium	15,000
Volos 2004	Volos	Alli Meria Stadium	1,000

==== League table ====
Pos	Team	Pld	W	D	L	GF	GA	GD	Pts	Qualification or relegation
1	PAOK	14	14	0	0	57	2	+55	42	Qualification for the play-off round
2	AO Trikala 2011	14	9	1	4	31	8	+23	28	Qualification for the play-off round
3	AEL	14	6	4	4	23	10	+13	22	Qualification for the play-off round
4	Elpides Karditsas	14	5	3	6	25	32	−7	18	Qualification for the play-out round
5	Kastoria GPO	14	4	4	6	24	20	+4	16	Qualification for the play-out round
6	Volos 2004	14	4	4	6	24	19	+5	16	Qualification for the play-out round
7	Aris Thessaloniki	14	4	4	6	17	26	−9	16	Relegation to Greek B Division
8	Avantes Chalkida	14	0	0	14	0	84	−84	0	Relegation to Greek B Division

Rules for classification: 1) Points; 2) Head-to-head points; 3) Goal difference; 4) Number of goals scored; 5) Head-to-head goal difference; 6) Head-to-head away goals scored

==== Results ====
Home \ Away	ARI	AVA	ELP	KAS	AEL	PAO	TRI	VOL
Aris Thessaloniki	—	6–0	1–1	0–1	0–0	0–3	1–0	0–0
Avantes Chalkida	0–6	—	0–6	0–7	0–3	0–8	0–6	0–5
Elpides Karditsas	1–2	8–0	—	1–1	1–4	0–4	0–8	2–0
Kastoria GPO	5–1	6–0	0–1	—	1–1	0–3	0–1	1–1
AEL	0–0	6–0	0–1	1–1	—	1–2	2–0	3–0
PAOK	9–0	3–0	6–0	6–0	2–0	—	1–0	5–0
AO Trikala 2011	3–0	6–0	4–1	1–0	1–0	0–3	—	0–0
Volos 2004	3–0	8–0	2–2	3–1	1–2	1–2	0–1	—

Legend: Blue = home team win; Yellow = draw; Red = away team win.

=== Group 2 ===
==== Teams ====
Locations of the 2022–23 Football League clubs

Team	City	Stadium	Capacity
Doxa Pigadakia	Pigadakia, Zakynthos	Machairado Municipal Stadium	200
Ergotelis	Heraklion	Nikos Kazantzakis Stadium	1,000
Leontikos Kifisia	Kifissia	Fotis Vardaxis Stadium	
Odysseas Moschato	Moschato	Municipal Stadium of Moschato	900
OFI Crete	Heraklion	Krousonas Municipal Stadium	1,500
Olympiada Imittos	Ymittos	Hymettus Municipal Stadium	1,000
REA	Rethymno	Sohora Municipal Stadium	
Trianton Ialysos	Ialysos	AS Chalkis Stadium	

==== League table ====
Pos	Team	Pld	W	D	L	GF	GA	GD	Pts	Qualification or relegation
1	Ergotelis	14	12	2	0	56	7	+49	38	Qualification for the play-off round
2	OFI	14	9	3	2	41	9	+32	30	Qualification for the play-off round
3	REA	14	9	2	3	27	9	+18	29	Qualification for the play-off round
4	Olympiada Imittos	14	6	4	4	27	21	+6	22	Qualification for the play-out round
5	Odysseas Moschato	14	5	3	6	19	18	+1	18	Qualification for the play-out round
6	Leontikos Kifisia	14	4	3	7	11	27	−16	15	Qualification for the play-out round
7	Trianton Ialysos	14	1	1	12	9	54	−45	4	Relegation to Greek B Division
8	Doxa Pigadakia	14	1	0	13	11	56	−45	3	Relegation to Greek B Division

Rules for classification: 1) Points; 2) Head-to-head points; 3) Goal difference; 4) Number of goals scored; 5) Head-to-head goal difference; 6) Head-to-head away goals scored

==== Results ====
Home \ Away	DXP	ERG	LEO	ODY	OFI	OLY	REA	IAL
Doxa Pigadakia	—	1–5	2–3	0–3	0–5	0–5	0–3	3–1
Ergotelis	10–0	—	5–0	1–0	0–0	3–1	3–1	10–0
Leontikos Kifisia	3–1	0–2	—	0–1	1–4	0–0	1–0	2–0
Odysseas Moschato	2–0	1–5	0–0	—	0–1	3–3	0–0	5–0
OFI	4–1	0–3	4–0	3–1	—	7–1	1–2	7–0
Olympiada Imittos	5–0	2–2	5–0	1–0	0–0	—	1–2	1–0
REA	3–0	0–1	2–0	4–1	0–0	3–0	—	5–0
Trianton Ialysos	4–3	1–6	1–1	0–2	0–5	1–2	1–2	—

Legend: Blue = home team win; Yellow = draw; Red = away team win.

== Second phase ==
=== Play-off round ===
Pos	Team	Pld	W	D	L	GF	GA	GD	Pts	Qualification or relegation	PAO	ERG	REA	OFI	TRI	AEL
1	PAOK (C)	16	15	0	1	47	8	+39	45	Qualification for the Champions League qualifiers	—	2–0	4–1	3–1	—	—
2	Ergotelis	16	12	2	2	37	12	+25	38		2–0	—	—	—	3–0	2–0
3	REA	16	9	2	5	24	14	+10	29		0–1	—	—	—	3–0	1–0
4	OFI	16	8	4	4	29	14	+15	28		2–3	—	—	—	1–0	2–0
5	AO Trikala 2011	16	7	2	7	20	16	+4	23		—	4–1	0–1	0–0	—	—
6	AEL	16	4	2	10	16	26	−10	14		—	1–4	1–4	0–3	—	—

Rules for classification: 1) Points; 2) Head-to-head points; 3) Goal difference; 4) Number of goals scored; 5) Head-to-head goal difference; 6) Head-to-head away goals scored
(C) Champions

=== Play-out round ===
Pos	Team	Pld	W	D	L	GF	GA	GD	Pts	Qualification or relegation	ELP	OLY	VOL	KAS	ODY	LEO
1	Elpides Karditsas	16	5	3	8	18	41	−23	18		—	2–1	—	—	1–2	2–0
2	Olympiada Imittos	16	4	6	6	22	26	−4	18		4–1	—	0–0	0–0	—	—
3	Volos 2004	16	4	5	7	15	25	−10	17		—	1–3	—	—	2–1	1–0
4	Kastoria GPO	16	4	5	7	16	22	−6	17		—	2–0	—	—	2–0	1–0
5	Odysseas Moschato	16	3	5	8	16	28	−12	14	Relegation to Greek B Division	1–1	—	2–2	3–2	—	—
6	Leontikos Kifisia	16	2	2	12	6	34	−28	8	Relegation to Greek B Division	4–2	—	0–1	0–4	—	—

Rules for classification: 1) Points; 2) Head-to-head points; 3) Goal difference; 4) Number of goals scored; 5) Head-to-head goal difference; 6) Head-to-head away goals scored

== Season statistics ==
=== Top scorers ===
As of 21 June 2023

Rank	Player	Club	Goals
1	(Slovakia) Nikola Rybanská	OFI	17
2	(Canada) Kiyani Johnson	Ergotelis	16
2	(Greece) Thomai Vardali	PAOK	16
2	(Colombia) Gisela Arrieta	REA	16
3	(El Salvador) Samaria Gómez	Elpides Karditsas	14
4	(Kenya) Esse Akida	PAOK	12
5	(Greece) Ioanna Chamalidou	OFI	11
6	(Canada) Tamara Brown	Ergotelis	10
6	(Greece) Nikoleta Tziara	Kastoria	10
7	(Greece) Mila-Michaela Ivits	Olympiada Imittou	9
7	(Greece) Vasiliki Giannaka	PAOK	9
8	(Greece) Maria Kapnisi	Odysseas Moschatou	8

== Awards ==
=== Best Greek Player ===
Winner	Club	Nominees	Source
Vasia Giannaka	PAOK	Danai Sidira; Ioanna Chamalidou	

=== Best Foreign Player ===
Winner	Club	Nominees	Source
(Slovakia) Nikola Rybanská	OFI	(Kenya) Esse Akida (Colombia) Gisela Arrieta Betancourt	

=== Best Goalkeeper ===
Winner	Club	Nominees	Source
(Greece) Zoi Nasi	Trikala	Panagiota Vlasiadou; Dimitra Giannakouli	

=== Best Young Player ===
Winner	Club	Nominees	Source
(Greece) Georgia Chalatsogianni	PAOK	Vasia Giannaka; Konstantina Kostopoulou	

=== Top Scorer ===
Winner	Club	Goals	Source
(Slovakia) Nikola Rybanská	OFI	17	

=== Best Coach ===
Winner	Club	Nominees	Source
(Greece) Lefteris Kanatas	PAOK	Nikos Kyriakopoulos; Giorgos Loules	

=== Best Greek Female Player Abroad ===
Winner	Club	Nominees	Source
Veatriki Sarri	(England) Brighton & Hove Albion	Eleni Markou; Anastasia Spyridonidou	
