= Thenia Zerva =

Greek footballer

Personal information
- Full name: Theoni Zerva
- Date of birth: 18 July 1997 (age 29)
- Place of birth: Athens, Greece
- Height: 1.63 m (5 ft 4 in)
- Position: Midfielder

Team information
- Current team: Marko WFC

Youth career
- Kalamata 91
- Elefsina

College career
Years	Team	Apps	(Gls)
2017–2018	MCC Tribunes	32	(36)
2019	Lincoln Memorial Railsplitters	21	(5)
2020–2021	Louisiana–Monroe Warhawks	28	(13)

Senior career*
Years	Team	Apps	(Gls)
- Odysseas Glyfadas
2014–2016	Ergotelis		
2016–2017	PAOK		
2019	Rochester Lady Lancers	3	(0)
2022–2023	Ergotelis	20	(6)
2023–2024	OFI	24	(1)
2024–2025	Kastoria		
2025–2026	Kifisia	22	(1)
2026–	Marko	1	(1)

International career^{‡}
2012–2013	Greece U17	9	(3)
2014–2016	Greece U19	9	(2)
2016–	Greece	3	(0)
- * Club domestic league appearances and goals as of 22 October 2026 ‡ National team caps and goals as of 27 October 2020

Theoni “Thenia” Zerva (Greek: Θεώνη “Θένια” Ζέρβα; born 18 July 1997), also known as Thenia Zervas, is a Greek footballer who plays as a midfielder for Marko WFC in the Gamma Ethniki and the Greece national team.

== Early life ==
Zerva was born in Athens and raised in Kalamata.

== College career ==
Zerva has attended the Monroe Community College, the Lincoln Memorial University and the University of Louisiana at Monroe in the United States.

== Club career ==
Zerva has played for Kalamata 91, Eleusina, Glyfada, Ergotelis and PAOK in Greece and for the Rochester Lady Lancers in the United States.

== International career ==
Zerva capped for Greece at senior level during two UEFA Women's Euro qualifyings (2017 and 2022).
