= Narcisse Ewodo =

Cameroonian-French basketball player

Personal information
- Born: 29 October 1972 (age 54) Yaoundé, Cameroon
- Listed height: 202 cm (6 ft 8 in)
- Listed weight: 96 kg (212 lb)

Career information
- High school: Lycee Leclerc (Yaoundé, Cameroon)
- College: Davidson (1994–1997)
- NBA draft: 1997: undrafted
- Playing career: 1997–2007
- Position: Small forward

Career history
- 1997: Spacer's de Toulouse
- 1998–1999: Élan Béarnais Pau-Orthez
- 1999–2000: Cholet
- 2001–2002: STB Le Havre
- 2002–2003: Ludwigsburg
- 2003–2007: BG Karlsruhe

Career highlights
- 2× French League champion (1998, 1999); All-BBL Second Team (2005); BBL Top Scorer (2005); Second-team All-SoCon (1997)

Narcisse Ewodo Beyala (born 29 October 1972) is a Cameroonian-French former professional basketball player. He played college basketball in the United States for the Davidson Wildcats and was an All-Southern Conference second-team during his senior season in 1997. Ewodo played professionally in France and Germany. He won two French League championships with Élan Béarnais Pau-Orthez in 1998 and 1999.

== Early life ==
Ewodo was born in Yaoundé, Cameroon, as one of seven children. His father, Joseph, was the chief of a tribe. Ewodo did not start playing basketball until he was aged 12. He attended Lycee Leclerc High School in Cameroon and averaged 20 points and 9 rebounds per game during his final season.

== College career ==
Ewodo moved to France where he attended L'Universite d'Aixen-Provence. Davidson Wildcats head coach, Bob McKillop, was encouraged by a friend to visit France so he could scout Ewodo and McKillop realised he was talented enough to play for the Wildcats. In August 1994, Ewodo was signed by the Wildcats. He joined the team alongside fellow Cameroonian Ray Minlend. The National Collegiate Athletic Association (NCAA) granted Ewodo three years of collegiate eligibility due to his age.

Ewodo averaged 8.5 points per game as a sophomore and 10.1 as a junior. He averaged 15.8 points per game during his senior season and was named to the All-Southern Conference second-team in 1997.

== Professional career ==
Ewodo began his career in France with Spacer's de Toulouse but left the team midseason to join Élan Béarnais Pau-Orthez. He won two French League championships with Pau in 1998 and 1999. Ewodo also played for Cholet and STB Le Havre in France.

Ewodo played in the German Basketball Bundesliga (BBL) where he was the top scorer with BG Karlsruhe during the 2004–05 season when he averaged 21 points per game.

== National team career ==
Ewodo played for the Cameroon national team at the FIBA Africa Championship 1992.

== Personal life ==
Ewodo has two daughters who are basketball players. His daughter, Marina, played college basketball for the UC Riverside Highlanders and has been a member of the Cameroon national team. Another daughter, Yohana, played at the youth level for the French national team.
