= Nikola Rybanská =

Slovak footballer (born 1995)

Personal information
- Date of birth: 3 February 1995 (age 31)
- Position: Forward

Team information
- Current team: OFI
- Number: 20

Youth career
- MFK Topvar Topoľčany

Senior career*
Years	Team	Apps	(Gls)
2010–2012	MFK Topvar Topoľčany		
2012	→ FK Union Nové Zámky (loan)		
2012–2015	FK Union Nové Zámky	35	(25)
2015–2016	Slovan Teplice	14	(17)
2018–2020	GFC Topoľčany	29	(77)
2020–2021	AEL	7	(10)
2022–	OFI	84	(71)

International career^{‡}
2011–2013	Slovakia U19	6	(0)
2014–	Slovakia	15	(7)
- * Club domestic league appearances and goals as of 4 June 2026 ‡ National team caps and goals as of 30 August 2025

Nikola Rybanská (born 3 February 1995) is a Slovak professional footballer who plays as a forward for Greek A Division club OFI and the Slovak national team. She also plays futsal for FSC Prievidza in the Slovak Futsal Extraliga and is the captain for the Slovakia women's national futsal team.

== Club career ==
=== Football ===
Rybanská began her career at MFK Topvar Topoľčany. On 22 March 2012, she was loaned to FK Union Nové Zámky with an option to buy. She was able to impress there in the next six months and moved permanently to Union Nové Zámky on 14 August 2012. In the 2012/2013 season, Rybanská won the championship for the first time with her club. She helped them win 3 league titles in a row as well as a Slovak Cup title. She made her Champions League debut on 8 August 2013 against Apollon. She scored her first and only UWCL goal in 2014 against Glentoran. In the second half of the 2014/15 season, she moved to Slovan Teplice and helped them reach 4th place in the league by scoring 7 goals in 5 matches. She started the first half of the following season by making 9 appearances and scoring 10 times, before taking a break from her football career to play futsal.

She returned in August 2018 to join Slovak second division club GFC Topoľčany. In 2018/19, they finished 2nd in their group and Rybanská was the top scorer of the league with 49 goals. In the following season, they were sitting at the top of their group undefeated after 10 games, but the second half of the season was cancelled due to the COVID-19 pandemic.

On 18 August 2020, she moved to Greece to join Greek A Division club AEL. She helped the club finish 3rd in the league as she scored 10 goals in 7 appearances. On 7 February 2022, she joined OFI. She only played 6 times in the 2021/22 season scoring 4 goals. In 2022/23, OFI finished 4th and Rybanská was the league's top scorer with 17 goals in 18 matches. She was also given the Best Foreign Player award. In 2023/24, she improved on her performance by scoring 24 goals in 22 matches, finishing as the season's top scorer again, and by helping OFI reach 2nd place in the league. She was once again awarded Best Foreign Player in the PSAPP awards and made the season's Best 11.

=== Futsal ===
She was playing for the Union Nové Zámky futsal team until 29 February 2016 when she joined Győri ETO futsal club in Hungary. In 2018, she returned to Slovakia to join CopyLeaders Prievidza where she plays until today. She was named Slovakia's Best Futsal Player for the 2021 season.

== International goals ==
No.	Date	Venue	Opponent	Score	Result	Competition
1.	27 February 2024	Anton Malatinský Stadium, Trnava, Slovakia	Latvia	2–0	6–0	2023–24 UEFA Women's Nations League play-off matches
2.	4 April 2025	Europa Point Stadium, Europa Point, Gibraltar	Gibraltar	7–0	8–0	2025 UEFA Women's Nations League
3.	8 April 2025	Zimbru Stadium, Chișinău, Moldova	Moldova	2–0	2–0	2025 UEFA Women's Nations League
4.	30 May 2025	Futbal Tatran Arena, Prešov, Slovakia	Gibraltar	1–0	11–0	2025 UEFA Women's Nations League
5.	30 May 2025	Futbal Tatran Arena, Prešov, Slovakia	Gibraltar	8–0	11–0	2025 UEFA Women's Nations League
6.	30 May 2025	Futbal Tatran Arena, Prešov, Slovakia	Gibraltar	11–0	11–0	2025 UEFA Women's Nations League

== Honours ==
=== Club ===
Topvar Topoľčany

- Slovak Cup; runner-up: 2010–11

Union Nové Zámky

- Slovak First League (3): 2012–13, 2013–14, 2014–15; runner-up: 2011–12
- Slovak Cup (2): 2013–14, 2014–15; runner-up: 2012–13

OFI

- Greek A Division; runner-up: 2023–24

=== Individual ===
- Slovakia's Best Futsal Player: 2021
- PSAPP Best Foreign Player: 2022–23, 2023–24, 2024–25
- PSAPP Top Scorer: 2022–23, 2023–24, 2024–25
- PSAPP Best XI: 2023–24, 2024–25
