= Maria Baska =

Albanian footballer (born 2000)

Personal information
- Date of birth: 2 November 2000 (age 26)
- Place of birth: Greece
- Height: 1.68 m (5 ft 6 in)
- Position: Striker

Team information
- Current team: UMF Afturelding

Senior career*
Years	Team	Apps	(Gls)
2015–2018	Amazones Thesprotias		(22)
2018–2019	Proodeftiki Peramatos	18	(5)
2019–2021	Elpides Karditsas	9	(6)
2021	Lokomotiv Stara Zagora	13	(19)
2021–2022	Omonia	11	(6)
2022	Lokomotiv Stara Zagora		
2022	Vllaznia		
2023	Trabzonspor	8	(5)
2023–2024	Vllaznia		
2024	Asteras Tripolis	15	(6)
2025–2026	Grótta	6	(1)
2026–	Afturelding		

International career^{‡}
2023—	Albania	3	(0)
- * Club domestic league appearances and goals as of 28 March 2025 ‡ National team caps and goals as of 28 March 2025

Maria Baska (Greek: Μαρία Μπάσκα; Albanian: Maria Bashka, born 2 November 2000) is a Greek-Albanian footballer who plays as a striker for Icelandic club UMF Afterelding. Born in Greece, she plays for the Albania national team.

== Early life ==
Maria was born into an Albanian family in Albania. Her family immigrated to Greece for work, where she grew up, attended school, and developed through the Greek football system. Despite this, she chose to represent the Albania national team at senior level. Although she was eligible and called to play for both Albania and Greece, she described the decision as a very difficult one, because she loves both countries equally. However, representing the country that she was born in felt like the fairer choice.

== Career ==
Baska played for Bulgarian side Lokomotiv (Stara Zagora), helping the club win the league. She then played for Cypriot side Omonia, where she was described as "one of the most resounding in the summer transfer window, as she is a particularly remarkable and talented footballer". She played for Albanian side Vllaznia in the UEFA Women's Champions League.

== Style of play ==
Baska mainly operates as a striker and is known for her speed.

== Personal life ==
Baska experienced sexist harassment in her football career, especially in Greece.
