= Vasiliki Giannaka =

Greek footballer

Vasia Giannaka
Personal information
- Full name: Vasiliki Giannaka
- Date of birth: 13 October 2004 (age 22)
- Place of birth: Agrinio, Greece
- Height: 1.65 m (5 ft 5 in)
- Position: Forward

Team information
- Current team: PAOK FC

Youth career
- 2011–2015: Kanarinia Agriniou
- 2015–2016: AEK Mesologgiou

Senior career*
Years	Team	Apps	(Gls)
2016–2021	AEK Mesologgiou	75	(27)
2021–2024	PAOK	58	(15)
2024–2025	Växjö	13	(1)
2025–	PAOK	13	(6)

International career^{‡}
2019	Greece U17	3	(0)
2021–2023	Greece U19	12	(5)
2021–	Greece	31	(1)
- * Club domestic league appearances and goals as of 28 May 2026 ‡ National team caps and goals as of 14 April 2026

Vasiliki Giannaka (born 13 October 2004) is a Greek professional footballer who plays as a forward for PAOK in the Greek A Division and for the Greek women's national team.

== Club career ==
Giannaka has played for PAOK in Greece at the UEFA Women's Champions League.

== International career ==
Giannaka has been capped for Greece at senior level for the 2023 FIFA Women's World Cup qualification round.

== Honours ==
=== Club ===
AEK Mesologgiou

- Greek B Division (2): 2016–17, 2018–19
- Greek U17 Cup (1): 2018

PAOK

- Greek A Division (4): 2021–22, 2022–23, 2023–24, 2025–26
- Greek Cup (2): 2024, 2025–26

=== Individual ===
- PSAPP Best Greek Player: 2022–23
- PSAPP Best XI: 2023–24
