= Olympiacos F.C. Women =

Olympiacos
- Full name: Olympiacos Football Club
- Nicknames: Thrylos (Legend); Erythrolefkes (Red-Whites)
- Founded: 2011 (refounded in 2025)
- Chairman: Michalis Kountouris
- Manager: Anastasios Fleggas
- League: Women's Beta Ethniki
- 2025-26: Women's Gamma Ethniki 4th Group, 1st (Promoted)
Home colours	Away colours	Third colours

Olympiacos Football Club is a Greek semi-professional women's football club, which currently competes in the Women's Beta Ethniki. It is part of the major multi-sports club Olympiacos SFP.

== History ==
The women's football department was founded in 2011 under Evangelos Marinakis, although up until 2016, they did not participate in any formal competition. In the 2016–17 season, the football team of the academy in Karditsa announced its participation in the Women's Gamma Ethniki.

=== Refounding ===
The women's department was refounded in 2025. In the 2025–26 season, they participated in the Gamma Ethniki. Their first training session took place shortly after that. Their first game was a 10–0 victory over Ethnikos Kalamatas. Olympiacos later won the championship of the 4th group of the Women's Gamma Ethniki, their first ever title.

== Players ==
=== Current squad ===
As of 6 November 2026

Note: Flags indicate national team as defined under FIFA eligibility rules; some limited exceptions apply. Players may hold more than one non-FIFA nationality.

No.	Pos.	Nation	Player
1	GK	GRE	Marisofi Mougiou
3	DF	GRE	Maria Georgoula
4	DF	GRE	Konstantina Mylona (captain)
5	MF	GRE	Sofia Pelekouda
6	MF	GRE	Maria Ioannidi
7	DF	GRE	Konstantina Xylouri
8	MF	GRE	Faidra Logou
10	FW	GRE	Nagia Veniamin
11	FW	GRE	Katerina Tzani
12	FW	GRE	Elpida Katsanou
13	DF	GRE	Xanthi Misirli
14	FW	GRE	Vasiliki Trygouti

No.	Pos.	Nation	Player
16	MF	GRE	Myrto Kolempa
17	MF	GRE	Athina Feggouli
19	FW	GRE	Konstantina Giannou
23	DF	GRE	Maria Matzana
25	FW	SWE	Astrid Larsson
27	DF	POR	Matilde Figueiras
29	FW	KEN	Nancy Atako
30	GK	GRE	Anna-Maria Panagiotopoulou
—	MF	KEN	Diana Wacera

== Personnel ==
=== Current staff ===
As of 25 August 2026

Position	Name
Head coach	(Greece) Anastasios Fleggas
Goalkeeper coach	(Greece) Konstantinos Dafkos
Fitness coach	(Greece) Nancy Kriempardi

== Honours ==
- Women's Gamma Ethniki (Tier III): Winners (1): 2025-26 (Group 4).
