= Nikoleta Pitsiou =

Greek footballer

Personal information
- Date of birth: 4 September 2000 (age 26)
- Position: Midfielder

Team information
- Current team: Asteras Tripolis
- Number: 20

Youth career
- 2014–2016: PAOK

Senior career*
Years	Team	Apps	(Gls)
2016–2021	PAOK		
2021–2022	Aris Limassol	16	(4)
2022–2024	Medyk Konin	24	(1)
2024–	Asteras Tripolis	44	(5)

International career^{‡}
2015–2016	Greece U17		
2018–2019	Greece U19	9	(0)
2020–	Greece	5	(0)
- * Club domestic league appearances and goals as of 4 June 2026 ‡ National team caps and goals as of 17 February 2023

Nikoleta Pitsiou (born 4 September 2000) is a Greek footballer who plays as a midfielder for Asteras Tripolis and the Greece national team. She previously played for Medyk Konin, Aris Limassol and PAOK.

== International career ==
Pitsiou made her debut for the Greece national team on 27 October 2020, coming on as a substitute for Thenia Zerva against Ukraine.

== Honours ==
PAOK

- Greek A Division (5): 2016–17, 2017–18, 2018–19, 2019–20, 2020–21
- Greek Cup: 2017
