= Andrea Gurtner =

Austrian footballer (born 2001)

Personal information
- Date of birth: 1 February 2001 (age 25)
- Place of birth: Braunau am Inn, Austra
- Height: 1.77 m (5 ft 10 in)
- Position: Goalkeeper

Team information
- Current team: Trabzonspor

Youth career
- 2006–2011: FC Branau
- 2011–2012: WSV-ATSV Ranshofen
- 2012–2015: ATSV Laab

Senior career*
Years	Team	Apps	(Gls)
2015	Raiffeisen Geretsberg		
2015–2018	Union Kleinmünchen	4	(0)
2018–2019	Altenmarkt	17	(0)
2019–2021	Landhaus/Austria Wien	14	(0)
2021	Wacker Innsbruck	4	(0)
2021–2023	Tenerife B	24	(0)
2023	LASK	12	(0)
2023–2024	OFI	24	(0)
2024–	Trabzonspor	18	(0)

International career
2019–2020	Austria U19	6	(0)
- * Club domestic league appearances and goals as of 27 December 2025

Andrea Gurtner (born 1 February 2001) is an Austrian women's football goalkeeper who playsin the Turkish Super League for Trabzonspor and the Austria national team.

== Early years in sport ==
Gurtner started playing football at FC Brunau in 2008. In 2011, she moved to WSV ATSV Ranshofen, and the next year to ATSV Laab. In 2015, she was with SB Raiffesien Geretsberg and Union Kleinmünchen.

== Club career ==
Gurtner moved to Altenmarkt in 2018, and the next year to FK Austria Wien. After a brief stay at FC Wacker Innsbruck, she transferred to UD Tenerife in Spain starting her professional career late August 2021. She went back home and joined LASK in Linz, where she was two months.

She moved to Greece, and played for OFI in the 2023–24 Greek A Division season.

Mid August 2024, she moved to Turkey, and signed with Trabzonspor to play in the Super League.

== Personal life ==
Andrea Gurtner was born in Braunau am Inn, Austra on 1 February 2001.
