= Peace Efih =

Nigerian footballer

Personal information
- Full name: Peace Ewomazino Efih
- Date of birth: 5 August 2000 (age 26)
- Height: 1.60 m (5 ft 3 in)
- Position: Midfielder

Team information
- Current team: Panathinaikos

Senior career*
Years	Team	Apps	(Gls)
- Edo Queens
2019	River Angels		
2019–2020	Sporting de Huelva	18	(0)
2020–2021	Zaragoza CFF	9	(0)
2021	Bayelsa Queens		
2021–2022	Kiryat Gat	2	(0)
2022–2024	Braga	28	(1)
2024–2026	OFI	40	(14)
2026–	Panathinaikos	1	

International career^{‡}
2016	Nigeria U17	2	(0)
2018	Nigeria U20	4	(1)
2022–	Nigeria	5	(1)
- * Club domestic league appearances and goals as of 20 September 2026 ‡ National team caps and goals as of 18 July 2024

Peace Ewomazino Efih (born 5 August 2000) is a Nigerian footballer who plays as a midfielder for Greek A Division club Panathinaikos and the Nigeria women's national team. She previously played for Edo Queens and Rivers Angels in the Nigeria Women Premier League. At the 2018 WAFU Zone B Women's Cup, Efih scored the lone goal in Nigeria's first game at the tournament.

In July 2019, Efih signed for Sporting de Huelva on a year deal.
