= Vasso Kydonaki =

Greek footballer

Vaso Kydonaki
Personal information
- Full name: Vasiliki Kydonaki
- Date of birth: 26 March 1993 (age 33)
- Place of birth: Tympaki, Greece
- Position: Midfielder

Team information
- Current team: OFI Crete W.F.C.

Youth career
- 2002–2010: AOT

Senior career*
Years	Team	Apps	(Gls)
2010–2016	Ergotelis		
2016–	OFI		

International career^{‡}
2010–2011	Greece U19	6	(1)
2010–	Greece	18	(1)
- * Club domestic league appearances and goals as of 28 August 2023 ‡ National team caps and goals as of 11:45, 24 October 2015 (UTC)

Vassiliki Kydonaki (born 26 March 1993), commonly known also as Vasso Kydonaki, is a Greek footballer who plays as a midfielder for Greek A Division club OFI.
