= Danai-Eleni Sidira =

Greek footballer

Personal information
- Full name: Danai-Eleni Sidira
- Date of birth: 14 January 1991 (age 35)
- Place of birth: Heraklion, Greece
- Position: Defender

Team information
- Current team: OFI Crete W.F.C. (assistant coach)

Youth career
- 1997–2007: Nees Ergoteli

Senior career*
Years	Team	Apps	(Gls)
2007–2013	Ergotelis		
2013–2020	Apollon Ladies	141	(59)
2020–2023	Ergotelis	39	(10)
2023–2024	Panathinaikos	22	(2)
2024–2025	OFI	18	(1)

International career^{‡}
2009–2024	Greece	84	(15)

Managerial career
- 2025: OFI (caretaker)
- 2026–: OFI (assistant)
- * Club domestic league appearances and goals as of 12 May 2025 ‡ National team caps and goals as of 12 May 2025

Danai-Eleni Sidira (born 14 January 1991) is a former Greek footballer who played as a defender. She spent most of her career playing in Cyprus, where she won numerous titles for Apollon Limassol. In Greece, she played for Ergotelis, Panathinaikos and OFI. She is one of the most capped players of all time for the Greek national team.

== Honours ==
Ergotelis

- B Division (1): 2008

Apollon Ladies

- First Division (5): 2014, 2015, 2016, 2017, 2019
- Cypriot Cup (5): 2014, 2015, 2016, 2017, 2018
- Cypriot Super Cup (4): 2013, 2014, 2015, 2017

Individual

- PASP Best 11 Women: 2018/19
- PSAT Fair Play Award: 2021

== International goals ==
No.	Date	Venue	Opponent	Score	Result	Competition
1.	15 April 2010	Mikheil Meskhi Stadium, Tbilisi, Georgia	Georgia	3–0	3–0	2011 FIFA Women's World Cup qualification
2.	21 August 2010	Arta Municipal Stadium, Arta, Greece	Scotland	1–0	1–4	2011 FIFA Women's World Cup qualification
3.	15 September 2012	Koševo City Stadium, Sarajevo, Bosnia and Herzegovina	Bosnia and Herzegovina	1–1	1–1	UEFA Women's Euro 2013 qualifying
4.	13 March 2015	Peyia Municipal Stadium, Pegeia, Cyprus	United Arab Emirates	2–0	7–0	Aphrodite Women Cup
5.	18 March 2015	Stelios Kyriakides Stadium, Paphos, Cyprus	Cyprus	2–0	2–0	Aphrodite Women Cup
6.	22 October 2015	Loni Papuçiu Stadium, Fier, Albania	Albania	3–1	4–1	UEFA Women's Euro 2017 qualifying
7.	26 January 2016	Trikala Municipal Stadium, Trikala, Greece	Albania	1–0	3–2	UEFA Women's Euro 2017 qualifying
8.	23 November 2016	Komotini Municipal Stadium, Komotini, Greece	Cyprus	2–0	5–1	Friendly
9.	8 April 2017	Selman Stërmasi Stadium, Tirana, Albania	Kosovo	6–0	6–0	2019 FIFA Women's World Cup qualification
10.	6 November 2019	Podgorica City Stadium, Podgorica, Montenegro	Montenegro	1–0	4–0	UEFA Women's Euro 2022 qualifying
11.	6 November 2019	Podgorica City Stadium, Podgorica, Montenegro	Montenegro	3-0	4–0	UEFA Women's Euro 2022 qualifying
