= Leonora Zheleva =

Bulgarian footballer

Leonora Zheleva Леонора Желева (Bulgarian)
Personal information
- Full name: Leonora Zhivkova Zheleva
- Date of birth: 13 May 1999 (age 27)
- Position: Midfielder

Team information
- Current team: Ludogorets Razgrad
- Number: 24

Senior career*
Years	Team	Apps	(Gls)
2018–2022	NSA Sofia		
2022–2023	Parquesol	29	(3)
2023–2024	AEL	26	(10)
2024–2025	Trikala 2011	21	(4)
2025	Farul Constanța	0	(0)
2025–2026	Trikala 2011	23	(3)
2026–	Ludogorets Razgrad	0	(0)

International career^{‡}
2015	Bulgaria U17	3	(0)
2016–2017	Bulgaria U19	6	(0)
2019–	Bulgaria	8	(1)
- * Club domestic league appearances and goals as of 4 June 2026 ‡ National team caps and goals as of 11 March 2024

Leonora Zhivkova Zheleva (Bulgarian: Леонора Живкова Желева; born 13 May 1999) is a Bulgarian footballer who plays as a midfielder for Ludogorets Razgrad and the Bulgaria women's national team.

== International career ==
Zheleva was capped for Bulgaria at senior level in a 0–6 friendly loss to Croatia on 14 June 2019.

== Honours ==
NSA Sofia

- Bulgarian League (3): 2018/19, 2019/20, 2020/21
- Bulgarian Cup (2): 2020/21, 2021/22
