= Ioanna Chamalidou =

Greek footballer

Personal information
- Full name: Ioanna Chamalidou
- Date of birth: 11 October 1996 (age 30)
- Place of birth: Giannitsa, Pella, Greece
- Position: Forward

Team information
- Current team: Asteras Tripolis F.C.

Senior career*
Years	Team	Apps	(Gls)
2011–2018	PAOK		
2018–2019	Aris Thessaloniki		
2019–2020	Zaragoza	9	(0)
2020	Beşiktaş	2	(0)
2020	Doxa 2016	1	(1)
2021	Badajoz	11	(2)
2021–2022	Aris Limassol	11	(9)
2022–2023	OFI	17	(11)
2023–2025	Panathinaikos	37	(8)
2025–2026	AEK	18	(2)
2026–	Asteras Tripolis		

International career^{‡}
2012	Greece U17	3	(0)
2013–2014	Greece U19	6	(1)
2016–	Greece	23	(0)
- * Club domestic league appearances and goals as of 4 August 2026 ‡ National team caps and goals as of 4 June 2026

Ioanna Chamalidou (Greek: Ἰωάννα Χαμαλίδου, born 11 October 1996 in Giannitsa, Greece) is a Greek footballer who plays as a forward for Asteras Tripolis and the Greece women's national team.

== Club career ==
From 2011 to 2018, Chamalidou played for the Greek Women's A Division team PAOK. While at PAOK, Chamalidou won six Greek A Division championship titles and five Greek Women's Cup championship titles. She participated in the 2010–11 UEFA Women's Champions League, all three Group 6 matches in the 2013–14 UEFA Women's Champions League qualifying round, all five matches in the 2015–16 UEFA Women's Champions League, scoring one goal against FC NSA Sofia. Chamalidou could not play during her last two seasons at PAOK due to two successive injuries.

By November 2018, Chamalidou had left PAOK, who had intended to loan her to a club outside of Thessaloniki. As she was attending the Aristotle University of Thessaloniki, Chamalidou rejected the offer and transferred to the A Division team Aris Thessaloniki.

In July 2019, Chamalidou moved to Spain to sign with Zaragoza CFF, which plays in the North Group of the Segunda División Pro League.

By the end of January 2020, Chamalidou had transferred to the Istanbul-based Beşiktaş J.K. to play in the second half of the 2019–20 Turkish Women's First Football League.

On 23 June 2020, she returned to Greece to play for A Division club Doxa 2016, but due to COVID-19 restrictions, she went back to Spain in January 2021, this time for Primera Federación club CD Badajoz. In the summer of the same year, she moved once again to Cyprus to play for Aris Limassol where she remained for the 2021/22 season.

On 2 November 2022, Chamalidou returned to Greece with A Division club OFI.

== International career ==
As a member of the Greek women's national under-19 football team, Chamalidou took part in the 2014 UEFA Women's Under-19 Championship qualification round, playing three matches and scoring a penalty against Kazakhstan. She also played in three matches at the 2015 UEFA Women's Under-19 Championship qualification round.

Chamalidou was then called up to the Greek women's national team and appeared in one of the UEFA Women's Euro 2017 qualifying Group 3 matches. After an injury that kept her off the national team list, Chamalidou returned to the team in 2020. She was a member of the team at the UEFA Women's Euro 2022 qualifying round and the 2023 FIFA Women's World Cup qualification round.

== Honours ==
=== Club ===
PAOK

- A Division (6): 2011/12, 2012/13, 2014/15, 2015/16, 2016/17, 2017/18
- Greek Cup (5): 2012/13, 2013/14, 2014/15, 2015/16, 2016/17

=== Individual ===
- PSAPP Special Award: 2021
