= Municipal Stadium of Moschato =

Football stadium in Moschato, Athens, Greece

Coordinates: 37°57′13.7″N 23°41′12.1″E

Stadium of Moschato
- Δημοτικό Γήπεδο Μοσχάτου
- Moschato stadium location
- Full name: Municipal Stadium of Moschato
- Address: Kapodistriou & Miaouli streets
- Location: Moschato, South Athens, Attica, Greece
- Owner: Moschato - Tavros Municipality
- Seating type: Wooden
- Capacity: 900 Spectators
- Executive suites: Νο
- Type: Stadium
- Event: Football matches
- Surface: Artificial turf
- Scoreboard: No
- Field size: 103 × 62,5 m
- Field shape: Rectangular
- Acreage: 9550 m²
- Public transit: Metro line 1, Moschato Station Tram line 1, Stop O.A.E.D. Bus line 500, Stop Gipedo Bus line 218, Stop Gipedo OSY

Construction
- Renovated: 21/12/2013
- Cost: €467,000 (for renovation)
- Project manager: Ioannis Asproulakis
- General contractor: Attica administrative region
- Main contractor: Terrain

The stadium of Moschato is a football stadium in Moschato, a suburb of Athens, Greece. It is owned by the Moschato-Tavros municipality and it is the home stadium of multiple clubs.

== Location ==
The stadium of Moschato is a sports venue owned by the municipality of Moschato - Tavros, located in southern Athens. It is to be found at the Kapodistriou & Miaouli streets junction and it hosts only football matches.

== Clubs ==
It is the home for numerous amateur and semi-professional football clubs playing at the 4th (or lower) tier of Greek football in Piraeus Football Clubs Association championships.

== Characteristics ==
The stadium can accommodate approximately 900 spectators on its two metal stands with wooden planks, one behind the goal on the South-southwest side of the pitch and another going along the touch-line at the west-northwest side of the pitch. Moschato's stadium is adequately equipped with floodlights and it is capable of hosting night games.

== Renovation ==
It was recently renovated (December 2013) and had its surface replaced with what it is to be considered one of the best artificial turfs, as it has been awarded with one star FIFA rating. In that renovation railings surrounding the pitch were also replaced and the total cost was of €467,000, solely financed by the Attica administrative region due to the municipality's insufficient funds.

== Access and public transit ==
Moschato's stadium does not possess parking infrastructures for its public. One can visit the sports centre by bus line 500, stop Gipedo and with bus line 218, stop Gipedo. There is also the possibility of using tram line 1, stop O.A.E.D. and metro line 1, Moschato station.
