= Asteras Tripolis F.C. (women) =

Greek women's football club (e. 2022)

Asteras Tripolis
- Full name: Αθλητικός Γυμναστικός Σύλλογος Αστέρας Τρίπολης (Athletic Gymnastic Club Asteras Tripolis)
- Nicknames: The Yellow-Blues; Arkádes (Arcadians)
- Founded: 31 August 2022; 4 years ago
- Ground: Theodoros Kolokotronis Stadium
- Chairman: Ioannis Tzorvas
- Manager: Alexandros Katikaridis
- League: Greek A Division
- 2025–26: A Division, 3rd
- Website: asterastripolis.gr
Home colours	Away colours

Asteras Tripolis Women's Football Club (Greek: ΠΑΕ Αστέρας Τρίπολης), commonly referred to as Asteras Tripolis (meaning "Star of Tripoli"), is a Greek women's association football club that competes in the Greek A Division and represents the major Greek football club Asteras Tripolis F.C..

It was founded in 2022 as Asteras took over Aris Tripolis, who had won promotion from the Greek C Division the previous season. They finished top of their group in the B Division and, after a play-off win against Feidon Argous, they earned a spot in the A Division for the first time.

== Current squad ==
As of 21 October 2026

Note: Flags indicate national team as defined under FIFA eligibility rules; some limited exceptions apply. Players may hold more than one non-FIFA nationality.

No.	Pos.	Nation	Player
1	GK	POR	Ana Rita Oliveira
2	DF	POL	Joanna Olszewska
3	DF	GRE	Zoi Kosta
4	MF	USA	Shelby High
5	DF	GRE	Anastasia Gkatsou (captain)
6	DF	GRE	Christina Bartza
7	FW	GRE	Konstantina Platania
8	DF	GRE	Fani Doiranli
9	FW	PUR	Juelle Love
10	FW	CYP	Maria Panagiotou
11	MF	GRE	Ioanna Pachaki
12	MF	GRE	Melina Glava

No.	Pos.	Nation	Player
13	FW	GRE	Katerina Vasilouni
15	GK	GRE	Panagiota Vlasiadou
16	MF	GRE	Marianna Goula
17	FW	GRE	Ioanna Chamalidou
18	MF	GRE	Anastasia Tzaferi
19	MF	GRE	Antonia Nika
20	FW	GRE	Nikoleta Pitsiou
22	DF	GRE	Maria Paterna
24	GK	GRE	Maria Petropoulou
25	DF	USA	Maddy Perez
45	FW	NGR	Olamide Adugbe
55	DF	CYP	Chryso Michael

== Personnel ==
As of 8 July 2026

Position	Name
Head of department	(Greece) Ioannis Tzorvas
General manager	(Greece) Giannis Vasilopoulos
Head coach	(Greece) Alexandros Katikaridis
Physiotherapist	(Greece) Andrianna Aligeorga
Reserve team coach	(Greece) Dimitris Eleftheriadis

=== Managerial history ===
Name	Years
(Greece) Grigoris Panagiotaros	2022–2023
(Serbia) Dragan Knezevic	2023–2024
(Greece) Makis Tagtalidis	2024–2025
(Slovakia) Martin Masaryk	2025–2026
(Greece) Alexandros Katikaridis	2026–

== Season to season ==
Season	League									Cup	UWCL	Top scorer	
Season	Div	Pos	Pld	W	D	L	GF	GA	Pts	Cup	UWCL	Name(s)	Goal
2022–23	B	1st (Gr:II)	16	13	1	2	59	6	40		—	(Greece) Georgia Marini	12
2023–24	A	4th	26	13	8	5	52	21	47	Quarterfinals	—	(Greece) Vasiliki Moskofidou	13
2024–25	A	4th	22	14	4	4	40	15	46	Quarterfinals	—	(Cyprus) Eirini Michail	16
2025–26	A	3rd	26	16	3	7	61	25	51	Runner-up	—	(Greece) Anastasia Spyridonidou	12

== Honours ==
- Greek B Division:
  - Winners (1) 2022/23,
