= Panathinaikos women's football =

Panathinaikos
- Full name: Παναθηναϊκός Αθλητικός Όμιλος; Panathinaïkós Athlitikós Ómilos (Pan-Athenian Athletic Club)
- Nicknames: I Prasines (The Greens); To Tryfili (The Shamrock)
- Founded: 1980; 2021 (re-establishment)
- Ground: Georgios Kalafatis Sports Center
- Chairman: Dimitris Vranopoulos
- Manager: Giannis Charalampidis
- League: Greek A Division
- 2025–26: Greek A Division, 5th
- Website: pao1908.com
Home colours	Away colours

Panathinaikos AC women's football is a Greek team, part of the major Athens-based multi-sport club Panathinaikos A.O. It was first founded in 1980 and operated until 1982. In its short presence, it produced the athletes who starred in the following years, who were decisive factors for the development of women's football in Greece. On June 30, 2021, the reactivation of the department was officially announced.

== History ==
The women's football department of Panathinaikos was one of the first to be established in Greece. It was founded in 1980 under the responsibility of Panathinaikos F.C. The original roster was completed through a selection between 200 young athletes.

The technical leadership of the team was taken over successively by Spilios Zacharopoulos, Gómez de Faria and Takis Ikonomopoulos. The department operated from 1980 to 1982 and the activity of the team was limited to friendly matches with other women's teams but also with men's. The most talented athletes of Panathinaikos were the striker Georgia Tzani, whom coach Gómez de Faria used to call "white Pelé", and the stopper Fotini Karadima, who was also called "Novoselac". The leader of the team was Anna Kotsopoulou.

The absence of a domestic championship, which started in 1987, or other competitive events was condemnatory for the section, although it consisted of athletes with remarkable potential. In 1982 the division ceased to exist, but Panathinaikos players continued to compete together as they immediately founded "Doxa Athens" (later renamed to "Doxa Piraeus"), with which they won 4 championships in 5 years, losing only one in a draw.

== Current squad ==
As of 21 October 2026

Note: Flags indicate national team as defined under FIFA eligibility rules; some limited exceptions apply. Players may hold more than one non-FIFA nationality.

No.	Pos.	Nation	Player
1	GK	USA	Jessica Berlin
2	DF	GRE	Matina Ntarzanou
4	DF	GRE	Kalliopi Kalokairinou
5	DF	USA	Sydney Shepherd
7	FW	JAM	Chinyelu Asher
8	MF	GRE	Evangelia Nanou
9	FW	GRE	Grigoria Pouliou (captain)
10	FW	GRE	Christina Kanellou
11	DF	GRE	Stefania Stergiouli
12	MF	GRE	Eirini Anastasia Askaridou

No.	Pos.	Nation	Player
13	FW	HAI	Chelsea Domond
14	DF	GRE	Foteini Koudouni
17	DF	GRE	Niki Siafarika
19	MF	GRE	Konstantina Kostopoulou
20	GK	GRE	Celia Katergiannaki
21	DF	USA	Kyra Karfonta
22	MF	GRE	Nasia Peiou
24	MF	NGR	Peace Efih
28	FW	GRE	Antigoni Papadopoulou
33	FW	GRE	Electra Tzourtzevits

== Technical and managerial staff ==
Position	Staff
Head coach	(Greece) Giannis Charalampidis
Assistant / Goalkeeper coach	(Greece) Nikos Thanopoulos
Physical trainer	(Greece) Dimitris Karkaletsos
Analyst	(Greece) Nikos Karadimitris
Physiotherapist	(Greece) Giorgos Spiliotopoulos
Team manager	(Greece) Ignatios Kartsaklis
Team manager	(Greece) Chara Dimitriou

== Season to season ==
Season	League									Cup	UWCL	Top scorer	
Season	Div	Pos	Pld	W	D	L	GF	GA	Pts	Cup	UWCL	Name(s)	Goal
2021–22	C	1st (Gr:VI)	8	8	0	0	50	0	24		—	(Greece) Matina Ntarzanou	11
2022–23	B	1st (Gr:III)	16	15	0	1	92	7	45		—	(Greece) Stella Ntzani	21
2023–24	A	3rd	26	19	3	4	77	17	60	Quarterfinals	—	(Greece) Anastasia Spyridonidou	21
2024–25	A	2nd	22	17	1	4	38	14	52	Runner-up	—	(Greece) Anastasia Spyridonidou	15
2025–26	A	5th	26	14	6	6	43	26	48	Third round	—	(Greece) Grigoria Pouliou	16

== Honours ==
- Greek 2nd division
  - Winner (1): 2022–23
- Greek 3rd division
  - Winner (1): 2021–22

== Notable players ==
- (Greece) Ioanna Chamalidou
- (Greece) Chara Dimitriou
- (Greece) Dimitra Giannakouli
- (Greece) Anastasia Gkatsou
- (Greece) Danai-Eleni Sidira
- (Greece) Eleni Kakambouki
- (Greece) Christina Kanellou
- (Greece) Fotini Karadima
- (Greece) Anna Kotsopoulou
- (Greece) Stella Ntzani
- (Greece) Niki Siafarika
- (Greece) Anastasia Spyridonidou
- (Greece) Marina Tsirouli
- (Greece) Georgia Tzani
- (Poland) Joanna Olszewska
- (Poland) Oliwia Rapacka
- (Portugal) Giovana Maia
- (Scotland) Abbi Grant
- (Slovenia) Manja Rogan

== Notable coaches ==
- (Greece) Giannis Charalampidis
- (Greece) Dimitris Rouvalis
- (Portugal) Gómez de Faria

== Shirt manufacturers and sponsors ==
Period	Kit manufacturer	Shirt main sponsor
2021–2023	Macron	Pame Stoixima
2023–present	Adidas	Pame Stoixima
