= Women's Gamma Ethniki =

Football league in Greece

- Organising body: Hellenic Football Federation (2010); Women's Football Clubs Association (2025)
- Founded: 2010; 16 years ago
- Country: Greece
- Confederation: UEFA
- Number of clubs: 63
- Level on pyramid: 3
- Promotion to: Women's Beta Ethniki
- Domestic cup: Greek Women's Cup
- Current champions: Group 1: Vasilissa Thrakis (2nd title); Group 2: PAOK Koilon Kozanis (1st title); Group 3: Omonoia Ano Liosion (1st title); Group 4: Olympiacos (1st title); Group 5: Niki Galatsiou (1st title); Group 6: Poseidon Kamisianon Rapanianion (1st title); Group 7: APGMS Kalloni (1st title)
- Most championships: Koakos Filinos; Aris Tripolis; Diagoras Rachon Ikarias (3 titles)
- Website: epo.gr
- Current: 2025–26 Gamma Ethniki

The Women's Gamma Ethniki (Greek: Γ΄ Κατηγορία ποδοσφαίρου γυναικών Ελλάδας) is a Greek Women's semi-professional football league, after the Regional Championship was split into second and third tiers from the 2010–11 season. It is the 3rd and lowest tier of the Greek Women's Football pyramid, behind the first tier Alpha Ethniki and the second tier Beta Ethniki.

== Champions ==
In italic, clubs that did not get promoted to the Beta Ethniki.

Season	Group 1	Group 2	Group 3	Group 4	Group 5	Group 6	Group 7	Group 8	Group 9	Group 10	Group 11
2010–11	Pierides Mouses	Amazones Thesprotias	Ifaistos Peristeriou	Chania							
2011–12	Mentekas Kalamarias	Olympiakos Kamynion	Koakos Filinos								
2012–13	Agrotikos Asteras Agias Varvaras	Thesprotos	Ikaros Petrotou	Pigasos Thriasiou	Arion Sitias	Aris Archangelou					
2013–14	Rodopi '87	Messolonghi 2008	Paniliakos	Agia Paraskevi	Sepoliakos	Analipsi	Stavros Kalythion				
2014–15	Vasilissa Thrakis	Asteras Ioanninon	AEL	Aris Tripolis	Rodia Xylokastrou	Athinaiki Agiou Dimitriou	Asteras Peramatos	Olympiada Ymittou			
2015–16	Panserraiki	Proodeftiki Peramatos	Pierides Mouses	Aris Korinthou	Feidon Argous	Pigasos Thriasiou	OFI	AS Trianton Ialysos			
2016–17	Agrotikos Asteras Evosmou	Agrotikos Asteras Agias Varvaras	Amazones Thesprotias	Diagoras Rachon Ikarias	Foinikas Agias Sofias	Karyatides Spartis	AO Vrilission	Ergotelis			
2017–18	Kilkisiakos	Kastoria	Seirines Grevenon	Aris Tripolis	Ethnikos Kalamatas	Apollonides Eretrias	Nees Drapetsonas	Neos Asteras Rethymnou	Koakos Filinos		
2018–19	Doxa 2016	Atromitos Patron	AO Trikala 2011	Ikaros Petrotou	Nees Atromitou	AE Kalamakiou Alimou	Chania	Stavros Kalythion			
2019–20	Leontes Thessalonikis	Seirines Grevenon	Magnisiakos	Niki Traganou	AS Pontion Drapetsonas	AO Trachonon Alimou	Sappho (Region 1); Diagoras Rachon Ikarias (Region 2)	Vasilissa Notou (Region 1); Koakos Filinos (Region 2)			
2020–21	The league was cancelled due to the COVID-19 pandemic.										
2021–22	Mentekas Kalamarias	Veria	Volos	Aris Tripolis	AEK	Panathinaikos	Mykonos	Ergotelis			
2022–23	Elpis Geniseas	Tigreis Ioanninon	PAOK B	Nefeles Katerinis	Chalkida	AOPK Patista	Aris Patron	Akratitos Ano Liosion	Thriamvos Haidariou	PO Agiou Thoma Goudi	Candia Sport
2023–24	Panserraiki	Panetolikos	PAOK B	Nereides Phthias	PAS Spartis	Acharnaikos	Thriamvos Haidariou	PAS Lesvou	Halis Varipetrou		
2024–25	Pontiakos Alexandroupolis	Shooters WFC	Thyella Pyrgou	AOPK Patista	AO Zoi	Fostiras Kaisarianis	Diagoras Rachon Ikarias	Irodotos			
2025-26	Vasilissa Thrakis	PAOK Koilon Kozanis	Omonoia Ano Liosion	Olympiacos	Niki Galatsiou	Poseidon Kamisianon Rapanianion	APGMS Kalloni				

== Notes ==
1.Amazones Thesprotias withdrew from the 2011–12 Beta Ethniki and a play-off match was held between Agia Paraskevi and AO Artas, with the former gaining promotion to the second division.
2.AO Trikala 2011 and AO Lavra also won promotion to the second division through the play-offs.
3.The club was dissolved.
4.Aris Tripolis was taken over by Asteras Tripolis, which took its place in the second division.
5.Elpis Geniseas parted ways with the men’s team and did not participate in any leagues for the 2023–24 season.
6.Thriamvos Haidariou finished level on points at the top of their group with PAS Athinon. A play-off match was held, in which PAS Athinon won 1–0 and secured promotion to the Beta Ethniki.
