= Anastasia Spyridonidou =

Greek footballer

Personal information
- Date of birth: 11 June 1997 (age 29)
- Place of birth: Veria, Greece
- Position: Winger

Team information
- Current team: AEK Athens F.C.

Senior career*
Years	Team	Apps	(Gls)
2011–2014	Agrotikos Asteras Agias Varvaras	32	(62)
2015–2018	Aris Thessaloniki	58	(42)
2018–2019	PAOK	17	(21)
2019–2020	Zaragoza CFF	7	(2)
2020	Apollon Ladies	8	(7)
2020–2021	PAOK	8	(18)
2021–2021	Pink Bari	27	(12)
2022–2023	Ternana	30	(30)
2023	Parma	11	(5)
2024–2025	Panathinaikos	35	(36)
2025–2026	Asteras Tripolis	24	(12)
2026–	AEK		

International career^{‡}
2014–2016	Greece U19	9	(0)
2016–	Greece	58	(19)
- * Club domestic league appearances and goals as of 29 July 2026 ‡ National team caps and goals as of 4 June 2026

Anastasia Spyridonidou (Greek: Αναστασία Σπυριδωνίδου; born 11 June 1997) is a Greek footballer who plays as a forward for the Greek club AEK Athens and the Greece women's national team.

== International goals ==
No.	Date	Venue	Opponent	Score	Result	Competition
1.	23 November 2016	Komotini Municipal Stadium, Komotini, Greece	Cyprus	5–1	5–1	Friendly
2.	12 November 2017	Štadión pod Čebraťom, Ružomberok, Slovakia	Slovakia	1–0	1–1	Friendly
3.	12 November 2019	Nea Smyrni Stadium, Athens, Greece	Republic of Ireland	1–1	1–1	UEFA Women's Euro 2022 qualifying
4.	21 September 2021	Pampeloponnisiako Stadium, Patras, Greece	Kazakhstan	1–0	3–2	2023 FIFA Women's World Cup qualification
5.	21 September 2021	Pampeloponnisiako Stadium, Patras, Greece	Kazakhstan	3–1	3–2	2023 FIFA Women's World Cup qualification
6.	11 November 2022	Georgios Kamaras Stadium, Athens, Greece	Cyprus	2–0	4–0	Friendly
7.	11 November 2022	Georgios Kamaras Stadium, Athens, Greece	Cyprus	3–0	4–0	Friendly
8.	7 April 2023	Georgios Kamaras Stadium, Athens, Greece	Croatia	1–0	1–1	Friendly
9.	10 April 2023	Georgios Kamaras Stadium, Athens, Greece	Croatia	1–1	2–1	Friendly
10.	10 April 2023	Georgios Kamaras Stadium, Athens, Greece	Croatia	2–1	2–1	Friendly
11.	15 July 2023	Telki Training Center, Telki, Hungary	Bosnia and Herzegovina	1–0	3–0	Friendly
12.	15 July 2023	Telki Training Center, Telki, Hungary	Bosnia and Herzegovina	2–0	3–0	Friendly
13.	15 July 2023	Telki Training Center, Telki, Hungary	Bosnia and Herzegovina	3–0	3–0	Friendly
14.	27 October 2023	Theodoros Vardinogiannis Stadium, Heraklion, Greece	Ukraine	2–1	2–1	2023–24 UEFA Women's Nations League
15.	25 February 2024	Arslan Zeki Demirci Sports Complex, Manavgat, Turkey	Turkey	2–1	2–1	Friendly
16.	9 April 2024	Estadi Nacional, Andorra la Vella, Andorra	Andorra	2–0	3–0	UEFA Women's Euro 2025 qualifying
17.	31 May 2024	Theodoros Vardinogiannis Stadium, Heraklion, Greece	Montenegro	2–1	2–2	UEFA Women's Euro 2025 qualifying
18.	16 July 2024	Camp FSCG, Podgorica, Montenegro	Montenegro	2–0	3–2	UEFA Women's Euro 2025 qualifying
19.	28 November 2024	NTC Senec, Senec, Slovakia	Slovakia	1–1	1–2	Friendly

== Honours ==
Agrotikos Asteras

- Gamma Ethniki (1): 2012–13

PAOK

- Greek A Division (2): 2018–19, 2020–21
