= OFI Crete W.F.C. =

Greek football club

OFI
- Full name: Όμιλος Φιλάθλων Ηρακλείου; Ómilos Filáthlon Heraklíou (Heraklion Fans' Club)
- Short name: OFI
- Founded: 2015; 11 years ago
- Ground: Vardinoyianneio Sports Center
- Chairman: Akis Georgakakos
- Manager: Giannis Chatzisevastos
- League: Greek A Division
- 2025–26: A Division, 4th

OFI Crete Women Football Club, or simply OFI, is a Greek women's association football club based in Heraklion, Greece and part of the professional football club O.F.I.. The club was founded in 2015 and currently competes in the Greek A Division.

== History ==
O.F.I. established a women's football department in the 2015–16 season, which started its journey from the Greek third division. In their first season, they went unbeaten in their group thus winning promotion to the second division. In 2016–17, OFI continued their undefeated streak, winning all eight of their games to get promoted to the Greek A Division for the first time.

During the 2017-18 Greek A Division season, they only won 3 out of 22 matches, resulting in their relegation back to the B Division. In 2018–19, they managed to top their group and bounce back to the first tier with the help of Maria Araviaki, who scored 18 goals, as well as Greek internationals Vasso Kydonaki, Maria Kokotsaki and Elisavet Apostolaki.

Since the 2019–20 season, they have been competing in the top tier of Greek football and in recent years they have become one of the best teams in the league. OFI have signed some notable players like Ioanna Chamalidou, Maria Paterna and Nasia Peiou that have represented Greece at international level, as well as footballers from abroad, like Gerli Israel, Nikola Rybanská, Victoria Kaláberová, Andrea Gurtner and Aqsa Mushtaq.

In the 2023-24 season, OFI finished second, the highest ranking in their history. Their top goal scorer was Slovak Nikola Rybanská who scored 24 goals. They also reached the semifinals of the 2024 Greek Cup, where they lost to PAOK.

== Current squad ==
As of 21 October 2026

Note: Flags indicate national team as defined under FIFA eligibility rules; some limited exceptions apply. Players may hold more than one non-FIFA nationality.

No.	Pos.	Nation	Player
1	GK	USA	Faith Davies
4	DF	GRE	Ioanna Bataoula
5	FW	GRE	Katerina Moschampari
6	FW	GRE	Elisavet Tachramani
7	DF	GRE	Matina Papadopoulou
8	MF	GRE	Eirini Drakonaki
9	MF	COL	Ximena Llerena
10	MF	GRE	Vasso Kydonaki (captain)
11	MF	GRE	Viktoria Spatharaki
12	GK	GRE	Christiana Vika

No.	Pos.	Nation	Player
13	MF	GRE	Giota Charitaki
14	DF	SSD	Amy Lasu
16	MF	GRE	Erofili Trouli
17	FW	GRE	Aimilia Giazatzidi
18	MF	CRO	Katarina Ðukić
19	DF	GRE	Ioanna Karnomouraki
20	FW	SVK	Nikola Rybanská
21	MF	MKD	Bojana Petkova
25	FW	GRE	Dimitra Lampraki
27	FW	GRE	Nefeli Mathioudaki
—	FW	GRE	Frantzeska Fisaraki
—	GK	GRE	Marina Saitaki

== Personnel ==
=== Management ===
As of 20 August 2026

Position	Name
President	
Vice President	
Technical Director	

=== Coaching staff ===
As of 31 August 2026

Position	Name
Head coach	(Greece) Giannis Chatzisevastos
Assistant coach	(Greece) Danai Sidira
Goalkeeping coach	(Greece) Giorgos Kalaitzakis
Fitness coach	(Greece) Giannis Kotis

=== Managerial history ===
Name	Years
(Greece) Zafiris Latsoudis	2015–2017
(Greece) Kostas Pantzaridis	2017–2018
(Greece) Dimitris Chomatas	2018–2020
(Greece) Petros Marinakis	2020
(Greece) Stamatis Mamatzakis	2020–2023
(Greece) Kostas Pantzaridis	2023–2024
(Greece) Antonis Androulakis	2024–2025
(Greece) Alexandros Katikaridis	2025–2026
(Greece) Giannis Chatzisevastos	2026–

== Season to season ==
Season	League									Cup	UWCL	Top scorer	
Season	Div	Pos	Pld	W	D	L	GF	GA	Pts	Cup	UWCL	Name(s)	Goal
2015–16	C	1st (Gr:VII)	10	10	0	0	48	1	30	—	—		
2016–17	B	1st (Gr:II)	8	8	0	0	25	1	24	First round	—	(Greece) Lena Nikitara (Greece) Vasso Kydonaki (Greece) Maria Christaki	4
2017–18	A	10th	22	3	4	15	10	48	10		—	(Greece) Vasso Kydonaki	5
2018–19	B	1st (Gr:IV)	14				47	7	32		—	(Greece) Maria Araviaki	17
2019–20	A	6th	14	6	1	7	21	26	19		—	(Greece) Vasso Kydonaki	10
2020–21	A	7th (Gr:II)	10	3	4	3	11	12	13		—	(Greece) Vasso Kydonaki	3
2021–22	A	3rd (Gr:II)	16	11	3	2	34	12	36		—	(Estonia) Gerli Israel	8
2022–23	A	4th	20	12	4	4	50	15	40		—	(Slovakia) Nikola Rybanská	17
2023–24	A	2nd	26	20	2	4	53	17	62	Semifinals	—	(Slovakia) Nikola Rybanská	24
2024–25	A	3rd	22	16	2	4	50	15	50	Quarterfinals	—	(Slovakia) Nikola Rybanská	22
2025–26	A	4th	26	15	4	7	49	20	49	Third round	—	(Nigeria) Peace Efih	9

== Honours ==
- Greek B Division (2): 2016–17, 2018–19
- Gamma Ethniki (1): 2015–16
