= Thomai Vardali =

Greek footballer

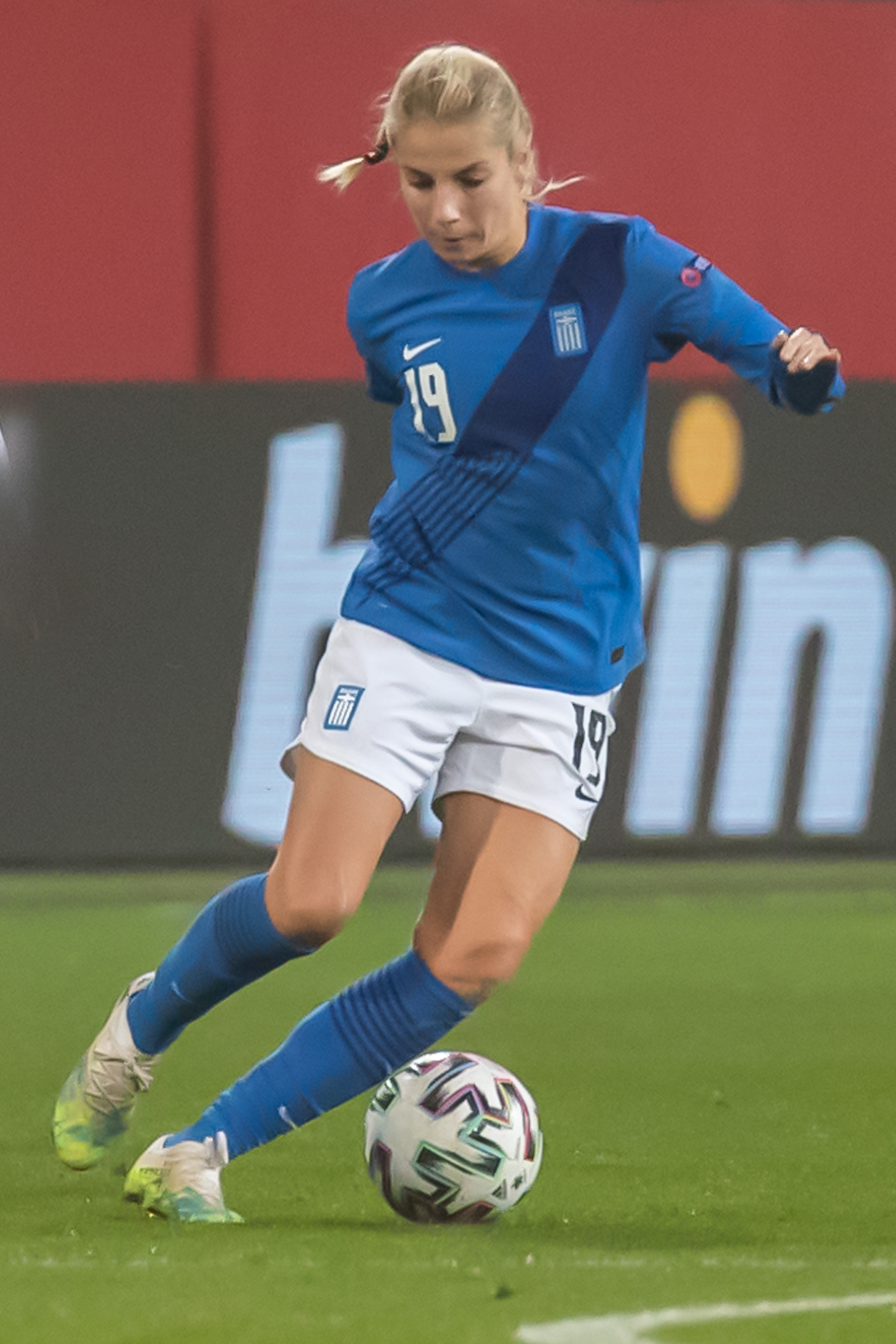
- 2020 for the Greek national team

Personal information
- Date of birth: 9 January 1995 (age 31)
- Place of birth: Thessaloniki
- Position: Midfielder

Team information
- Current team: PAOK
- Number: 10

College career
Years	Team	Apps	(Gls)
2013–2016	ETSU Buccaneers		

Senior career*
Years	Team	Apps	(Gls)
2008–	PAOK		

International career^{‡}
2010–2011	Greece U17	6	(1)
2011–2013	Greece U19	10	(3)
2019–	Greece	13	(1)
- * Club domestic league appearances and goals ‡ National team caps and goals as of 19 August 2024

Thomai Vardali (born 9 January 1995) is a Greek footballer who plays as a forward for A Division club PAOK FC and the Greece women's national team.

== Career ==
On 19 February 2024 she scored her 100th official goal with PAOK FC.
