= PAS Giannina (sports club) =

Multi-sport club based in Ioannina, Greece

- Full name: Πανηπειρωτικός Αθλητικός Σύλλογος Γιάννινα (Panepirotic Athletic Club Giannina)
- Nickname: Άγιαξ της Ηπείρου (Ajax of Epirus)
- Founded: 8 July 1966; 60 years ago
- Colours: Blue, White
- Chairman: Napoleon Tsakanelis
- Website: fcpasgiannina.gr

Panepirotikos Athlitikos Syllogos Giannina (Greek: Πανηπειρωτικός Αθλητικός Σύλλογος Γιάννινα, Panepirotic Athletic Club Giannina) is a Greek multi-sport club based in the city of Ioannina, capital of Greece's Epirus region.

PAS Giannina was formed in 8 July 1966 as a result of the union of the two local teams – AO Ioanninon (union of Atromitos Ioanninon and Olympiacos Ioanninon in 1962) and PAS Averof. Its colors are blue and white. A bull was chosen as the emblem of the new team, as it appeared on the ancient coin of the Epirote League.

== Departments ==
- PAS Giannina FC - Football
- PAS Giannina BC
- PAS Giannina women's basketball
- PAS Giannina women's volleyball
- Swimming
- Finswimming
- Fencing

== Sport facilities ==
The football team plays in Zosimades stadium in Ioannina. The basketball teams play in the Eanki indoor arena until 2018. From this year, the teams will use the new indoor arena. The volleyball team play in the Eanki indoor arena. The swimming and finswimming team play in the natatorium of Eanki. The fencing team used training facilities in Kepavi. The team uses new training facilities from October 2019.

== Notable supporters ==
- Giorgos Christovasilis, former club owner
- Ray Hudson, footballer, commentator
- Karolos Papoulias, former President of Hellenic Republic
