= 2026–27 Greek A Division (women's football) =

38th season of top women's football (soccer) league in Greece

Greek A Division
- Season: 2026–27
- Dates: 19 September 2026 – 11 April 2027
- Matches: 12
- Goals: 33 (2.75 per match)
- All statistics correct as of 4 October 2026.

The 2026–27 Greek A Division season is the 38th and current season of the women's football top-level league in Greece. PAOK are the defending champions.

== Teams ==
=== Changes ===
Promoted from 2025–26 Greek B Division	Relegated from 2025–26 Greek A Division
Seirines Grevenon; PAS Pyrgos	Acharnaikos (Note: On 7 October 2025, Acharnaikos withdrew from the competition due to serious administrative issues.); Nees Atromitou; Trikala 2011; Volos 2004

=== Stadiums and locations ===
Locations of the 2026–27 season clubs

Team	City	Stadium	Capacity
AEK Athens	Nea Filadelfeia	Agioi Anargyroi Municipal Stadium	5,000
Agia Paraskevi	Agia Paraskevi	Agia Paraskevi Stadium	2,800
Asteras Tripolis	Tripoli	Panarkadikos Stadium	4,000
Kifisia	Kifissia	Municipal Stadium of Kifissia "Zirineio"	1,400
Odysseas Moschatou	Moschato	Municipal Stadium of Moschato	900
OFI Crete	Heraklion	Vardinoyianneio Sports Center	1,000
Panathinaikos	Athens	Vari Municipal Stadium	2,500
PAOK	Thessaloniki	Neoi Epivates Municipal Stadium	3,000
PAS Pyrgos	Pyrgos	Grigorios Kalakos Stadium	700
REA	Rethymno	Rethymno Municipal Stadium	1,300
Seirines Grevenon	Grevena	Grevena Association Stadium	
Volos	Volos	Olga Vasdeki Sports Center	

=== Personnel and sponsorship ===
Team	Head coach	Captain	Kit manufacturer	Main shirt sponsor
AEK Athens	(Greece) Dimitrios Anakoglou	(Greece) Despoina Chatzinikolaou	(United States) Nike	Novibet
Agia Paraskevi	(Greece) Dimitrios Kalykas	(Greece) Loukia Prifti	(United States) Nike	Dixan
Asteras Tripolis	(Greece) Alexandros Katikaridis	(Greece) Anastasia Gkatsou	(United States) Nike	None
Kifisia	(Greece) Giorgos Papakostoulis	(Greece) Ioanna Melissou	(Germany) Erima	Tutu Deals
Odysseas Moschatou	(Greece) Nikos Galitsios	(Greece) Maria Papakosta	(Germany) Adidas	None
OFI Crete	(Greece) Giannis Chatzisevastos	(Greece) Vasso Kydonaki	(Italy) Macron	None
Panathinaikos	(Greece) Giannis Charalampidis	(Greece) Grigoria Pouliou	(Germany) Adidas	Pame Stoixima
PAOK	(Greece) Thanasis Patrikidis	(Greece) Maria Mitkou	(Italy) Macron	Stoiximan
PAS Pyrgos	(Greece) Andreas Tryfonopoulos	(Greece) Aspasia Biriti	(Germany) Adidas	None
REA	(Greece) Gianna Douka	(Greece) Kalioppi Vorria	(Italy) Erreà	Avin Oil
Seirines Grevenon	(Greece) Vasilios Dellios	(Greece) Eleni Mouratidou	(Italy) Macron	Alfa Wood Group
Volos	(Greece) Dimitrios Vlachos	(Colombia) Gisela Betancourt	(England) Admiral	None

=== Managerial changes ===
Team	Outgoing manager	Manner of departure	Date of vacancy	Position in table	Incoming manager	Date of appointment
OFI	(Greece) Nikos Tsagatakis (interim)	End of interim spell	17 May 2026	Preseason	(Greece) Giannis Chatzisevastos	19 August 2026
REA	(Greece) Stelios Kozanidis	End of contract	18 May 2026	Preseason	(Greece) Gianna Douka	19 May 2026
Asteras Tripolis	(Slovakia) Martin Masaryk	End of contract	30 May 2026	Preseason	(Greece) Alexandros Katikaridis	8 July 2026
AEK	(Greece) Thalis Theodoridis	End of contract	6 June 2026	Preseason	(Greece) Stelios Kozanidis	6 June 2026
Kifisia	(Greece) Dimitris Benetatos (interim)	End of interim spell	10 June 2026	Preseason	(Greece) Giorgos Papakostoulis	25 June 2026
Volos	(Greece) Elena Kouskouni	End of contract	20 June 2026	Preseason	(Greece) Dimitris Vlachos	1 July 2026
Pyrgos	(Greece) Andreas Tryfonopoulos	End of contract	30 June 2026	Preseason	(Greece) Elena Kouskouni	22 July 2026
Seirines Grevenon	(Greece) Christos Chasiotis	Sacked	25 October 2026	9th	(Greece) Sofoklis Kyratzis (caretaker)	25 October 2026
Seirines Grevenon	(Greece) Sofoklis Kyratzis (caretaker)	End of tenure as caretaker	1 November 2026	10th	(Greece) Vasilios Dellios	1 November 2026
Pyrgos	(Greece) Elena Kouskouni	Mutual consent	12 November 2026	10th	(Greece) Andreas Tryfonopoulos (caretaker)	12 November 2026
AEK	(Greece) Stelios Kozanidis	Sacked	18 November 2026	3rd	(Greece) Dimitrios Anakoglou	18 November 2026

=== Foreign players ===
- Clubs were allowed to include only up to six (6) foreign players on the match sheet, and up to six (6) foreign players could participate throughout the duration of the match.
- Player names in **bold** indicate the player was registered during the mid-season transfer window.
- Player names in italics were out of the squad or left the club within the season, after the pre-season transfer window, or in the mid-season transfer window, and at least had one appearance.

Team	Player 1	Player 2	Player 3	Player 4	Player 5	Player 6	Extra players	Former players
AEK	(El Salvador) Makenna Domínguez	(Australia) Ava Piazza	(United States) Mallory McGuire	(India) Manisha Kalyan	(United States) Hannah Anselmo	(Cyprus) Antri Violari	(Colombia) Liced Serna	
Agia Paraskevi	(United States) Taiana Tolleson	(Belgium) Léa Cordier	(Venezuela) Nerimar Suárez	(Norway) Rikke Stoltenberg	(United States) Zoe Crockett	(Serbia) Jasna Đorđević		
Asteras Tripolis	(United States) Shelby High	(Portugal) Ana Rita Oliveira	(Cyprus) Chryso Michael	(Nigeria) Olamide Adugbe	(United States) Maddy Perez	(Poland) Joanna Olszewska	(Puerto Rico) Juelle Love (Cyprus) Maria Panagiotou	
Kifisia	(Republic of Ireland) Michelle O’Driscoll	(United States) Isabella Da Silva						
Odysseas Moschatou	(Norway) Karoline Riisnæs	(United States) Bailey Moyer	(United States) Sophia Jaime	(Pakistan) Aqsa Mushtaq				
OFI	(Slovakia) Nikolá Rybanska	(South Sudan) Amy Lasu	(United States) Faith Davies	(Croatia) Katarina Ðukić	(North Macedonia) Bojana Petkova			(Colombia) Ximena Llerena
Panathinaikos	(Haiti) Chelsea Domond	(Nigeria) Peace Efih	(United States) Sydney Shepherd	(United States) Kyra Karfonta	(United States) Jessica Berlin	(Jamaica) Chinyelu Asher		(France) Lalia Storti
PAOK	(Brazil) Daniele Neuhaus	(Bosnia and Herzegovina) Minela Gačanica	(North Macedonia) Lenche Andreevska	(Spain) Marta Llopis	(Cyprus) Eirini Michail	(Wales) Grace Morris		
Pyrgos	(Latvia) Anastasija Ročāne	(Montenegro) Tatjana Đurković	(United States) Maggie McBroom	(Colombia) Sofía Buitrago	(New Zealand) Jana Radosavljević	(Colombia) Andrea Mendoza	(Venezuela) Jaimar Torrealba (Egypt) Sarah Essam (England) Eve Blakey	
REA	(Andorra) Maria Ruzafa	(Kenya) Topister Situma	(Spain) Yolanda Bonnín	(Japan) Nanako Kobayashi	(United States) Avery Klingensmith	(United States) Lindsey Chau	(United States) Maddy Murphy	
Seirines Grevenon	(Kenya) Dorcas Sikobe	(Kenya) Tumaini Waliaula	(Kenya) Leila Apiyo	(Netherlands) Sofie Beene	(Kenya) Samantha Okeya	(New Zealand) Isabella Atkinson	(Netherlands) Carmen Segers	
Volos	(Argentina) Yamila Francescato	(Colombia) Gisela Betancourt	(El Salvador) Idalia Serrano	(United States) Reagan Bridges	(Albania) Ezmiralda Franja	(Turkey) Gülsüm Çakır	(Zimbabwe) Samiah Phiri	

== League table ==
Pos	Team	Pld	W	D	L	GF	GA	GD	Pts	Qualification or relegation
1	PAOK	8	8	0	0	22	2	+20	24	Qualification for the Champions League first qualifying round
2	Asteras Tripolis	7	6	0	1	26	2	+24	18	
3	Panathinaikos	7	6	0	1	18	3	+15	18	
4	AEK	8	5	1	2	16	3	+13	16	
5	Volos	8	3	2	3	10	10	0	11	
6	Agia Paraskevi	8	3	1	4	8	9	−1	10	
7	REA	8	3	1	4	8	12	−4	10	
8	Seirines Grevenon	8	3	1	4	7	15	−8	10	
9	PAS Pyrgos	8	3	0	5	8	18	−10	9	
10	Kifisia	8	1	2	5	5	24	−19	5	
11	Odysseas Moschatou (Note: Odysseas Moschatou were dedacted 3 points by the ESPG.)	8	1	1	6	3	17	−14	1	Relegation to Greek B Division
12	OFI	8	0	1	7	2	18	−16	1	Relegation to Greek B Division

First match(es) will be played: 22 November 2026. Source: EPO
Rules for classification: 1) Points; 2) Head-to-head points; 3) Goal difference; 4) Number of goals scored; 5) Head-to-head goal difference; 6) Head-to-head away goals scored

== Results ==
Home \ Away	AEK	AGI	AST	KIF	ODY	OFI	PAN	PAO	PYR	REA	SEI	VLS
AEK	—							0–1	4–0		3–0	1–1
Agia Paraskevi	0–1	—		1–1						2–0	2–1	
Asteras Tripolis			—	6–0	6–1	4–0						
Kifisia	0–5			—						1–1		0–4
Odysseas Moschatou	0–2				—	0–0	0–1	0–2				
OFI				1–2		—	0–4		1–2	0–2		
Panathinaikos							—		4–0	2–0		
PAOK		2–0		5–1			3–1	—				
PAS Pyrgos		1–2	0–2					0–5	—			
REA			0–4		2–0				0–3^{[a]}	—		3–0
Seirines Grevenon			0–4		3–0	1–0	0–5				—	
Volos		1–0				3–0		0–3			1–1	—

Updated to match(es) played on 21 November 2026. Source: EPO
Legend: Blue = home team win; Yellow = draw; Red = away team win.

^{a} The match was cancelled and awarded to PAS Pyrgos due to unsuitability of the field.

== Season statistics ==
As of 22 November 2026

=== Goalscorers ===
Rank	Player	Club	Goals
1	(Nigeria) Olamide Adugbe	Asteras Tripolis	9
1	(Bosnia and Herzegovina) Minela Gačanica	PAOK	9
2	(Greece) Despoina Chatzinikolaou	AEK	7
3	(Greece) Anastasia Gkatsou	Asteras Tripolis	4
4	(Greece) Eleni Saich	AEK	3
4	(Norway) Rikke Stoltenberg	Agia Paraskevi	3
4	(Greece) Christina Kanellou	Panathinaikos	3
4	(Greece) Evangelia Nanou	Panathinaikos	3
4	(North Macedonia) Lenche Andreevska	PAOK	3
4	(Andorra) Maria Ruzafa	REA	3

=== Assists ===
Rank	Player	Club	Goals
1	(Cyprus) Maria Panagiotou	Asteras Tripolis	4
2	(Nigeria) Olamide Adugbe	Asteras Tripolis	3
2	(Greece) Maria Mitkou	PAOK	3
3	13 players		2

=== Hat-tricks ===
Player	For	Against	Result	Date	Round
(Nigeria) Olamide Adugbe	Asteras Tripolis	Odysseas Moschatou	6–1 (H)	18 October 2026	3

(H) – Home; (A) – Away

=== Clean sheets ===
Rank	Player	Club	Goals
1	(Greece) Celia Katergiannaki	Panathinaikos	6
2	(Greece) Zoi Nasi	AEK	5
2	(Greece) Panagiota Vlasiadou	Asteras Tripolis	5
3	(Greece) Chrysa Grigoriadou	PAOK	4
4	(Greece) Eirini Manoukaraki	REA	3
4	(El Salvador) Idalia Serrano	Volos	3
5	(Brazil) Dani Neuhaus	PAOK	2
5	(Kenya) Samantha Okeya	Seirines Grevenon	2

=== Discipline ===
	Most yellow cards	Total	Most red cards	Total
Player	(Greece) Ioanna Melissou (Kifisia)	4	(United States) Avery Klingensmith (REA)	1
Club	OFI	19	REA	1
