= Greece women's national football team results (2020–present) =

- Win Draw Loss

This is a list of the Greece women's national football team results and scheduled fixtures from 2020 to the present.

== Results ==
Legend

Win Draw Lose Fixture

=== 2020 ===
5 March 2020 UEFA Women's Euro 2022 qualifying	Republic of Ireland	1–0	Greece	Dublin, Ireland
21:15 EET	Caldwell 45'	UEFA; HFF		Stadium: Tallaght Stadium; Attendance: 4,511; Referee: María Dolores Martínez Madrona (Spain)

22 September 2020 UEFA Women's Euro 2022 qualifying	Ukraine	4–0	Greece	Kyiv, Ukraine
19:00 EEST	Kozlova 59', 71'; Kravets 88'; Apanaschenko 90+5'	UEFA; HFF		Stadium: Obolon Arena; Attendance: 0 Referee: Ivana Martinčić (Croatia)

22 October 2020 UEFA Women's Euro 2022 qualifying	Greece	1–0	Montenegro	Athens, Greece
17:30 EEST	Markou 84'	UEFA; HFF		Stadium: Leoforos Alexandras Stadium; Attendance: 0 Referee: Miriama Matulová (Slovakia)

27 October 2020 UEFA Women's Euro 2022 qualifying	Greece	0–4	Ukraine	Athens, Greece
17:30 EET		UEFA; HFF	Pantsulaia 5'; Kravets 29', 55'; Kunina 83'	Stadium: Leoforos Alexandras Stadium; Attendance: 0 Referee: Shona Shukrula (Netherlands)

27 November 2020 UEFA Women's Euro 2022 qualifying	Germany	6–0	Greece	Ingolstadt, Germany
17:00 EET	Hegering 17'; Freigang 21', 39', 45'; Dallmann 72'; Krumbiegel 90+2'	UEFA; HFF		Stadium: Audi Sportpark; Attendance: 0 Referee: Marta Frías Acedo (Spain)

=== 2021 ===
17 September 2021 2023 FIFA Women's World Cup qualification	Greece	0–10	France	Patras, Greece
18:00 EEST		FIFA; UEFA; HFF	Majri 14'; Geyoro 15', 40'; Katoto 18', 25', 53'; Palama 30' (o.g.); Diani 38'; Asseyi 65'; Renard 90+2' (pen.)	Stadium: Pampeloponnisiako Stadium; Referee: Anastasia Pustovoitova (Russia)

21 September 2021 2023 FIFA Women's World Cup qualification	Greece	3–2	Kazakhstan	Patras, Greece
20:00 EEST	Spyridonidou 7', 72'; Aitymova 45+2' (o.g.)	FIFA; UEFA; HFF	Bortnikova 19'; Kirgizbaeva 81'	Stadium: Pampeloponnisiako Stadium; Referee: Eszter Urbán (Hungary)

22 October 2021 2023 FIFA Women's World Cup qualification	Kazakhstan	0–1	Greece	Astana, Kazakhstan
14:00 EEST		FIFA; UEFA; HFF	Pouliou 85'	Stadium: Astana Arena; Referee: Marina Krupskaya (Russia)

26 October 2021 2023 FIFA Women's World Cup qualification	Greece	1–4	Slovenia	Larissa, Greece
21:00 EEST	Chatzinikolaou 10' (pen.)	Report (FIFA); Report (UEFA); HFF	Zver 8', 59'; Prašnikar 18', 86'	Stadium: AEL FC Arena; Referee: Ivana Projkovska (North Macedonia)

26 November 2021 2023 FIFA Women's World Cup qualification	Wales	5–0	Greece	Llanelli, Wales
21:15 EET	Ingle 7'; K. Green 17'; Holland 26', 56'; Harding 64'	Report (FIFA); Report (UEFA); HFF		Stadium: Parc y Scarlets; Referee: Henrikke Nervik (Norway)

30 November 2021 2023 FIFA Women's World Cup qualification	Slovenia	0–0	Greece	Nova Gorica, Slovenia
19:00 EET		Report (FIFA); Report (UEFA); HFF		Stadium: Nova Gorica Sports Park; Referee: Maria Sole Caputi (Italy)

=== 2022 ===
19 February 2022 Friendly	Greece	1–0	Israel	Patras, Greece
14:30 EET	Nakav 35' (o.g.)	HFF		Stadium: Pampeloponnisiako Stadium

21 February 2022 Friendly	Greece	2–2	Israel	Patras, Greece
11:00 EET	David 6' (o.g.); Mitkou 42'	HFF	Selimhodzic 28'; Sommer 90'	Stadium: Pampeloponnisiako Stadium

8 April 2022 2023 FIFA Women's World Cup qualification	Estonia	1–3	Greece	Tallinn, Estonia
19:00 EEST	Himanen 63'	Report (FIFA); Report (UEFA); HFF	Kongouli 14', 21'; Sarri 76'	Stadium: Lilleküla Stadium; Referee: Lucie Šulcová (Czech Republic)

12 April 2022 2023 FIFA Women's World Cup qualification	Greece	3–0	Estonia	Patras, Greece
20:00 EEST	Sarri 19'; Kongouli 48'; Pouliou 74'	Report (FIFA); Report (UEFA); HFF		Stadium: Pampeloponnisiako Stadium; Referee: Simona Ghisletta (Switzerland)

22 June 2022 Friendly	Portugal	4–0	Greece	Lisbon, Portugal
20:00 EEST	D. Silva 14' (pen.); Nazareth 29', 42'; J. Silva 36'	HFF		Stadium: Estádio do Restelo

25 June 2022 Friendly	Portugal	1–0	Greece	Estoril, Portugal
21:00 EEST	Costa 61' (pen.)	HFF		Stadium: Estádio António Coimbra da Mota

2 September 2022 2023 FIFA Women's World Cup qualification	Greece	0–1	Wales	Volos, Greece
20:00 EEST		Report (FIFA); Report (UEFA); HFF	Jones 34'	Stadium: Panthessaliko Stadium; Referee: Monika Mularczyk (Poland)

6 September 2022 2023 FIFA Women's World Cup qualification	France	5–1	Greece	Sedan, France
21:45 EEST	Geyoro 9'; Diani 18', 45+9'; Malard 45'; Baltimore 59'	Report (FIFA); Report (UEFA); HFF	Koggouli 20'	Stadium: Stade Louis Dugauguez; Referee: Riem Hussein (Germany)

11 November 2022 Friendly	Greece	4–0	Cyprus	Athens, Greece
12:00 EET	Sarri 17'; Spyridonidou 29', 41'; Pouliou 94'	HFF		Stadium: Georgios Kamaras Stadium

14 November 2022 Friendly	Greece	1–0	Cyprus	Athens, Greece
12:00 EET	Sarri 70'	HFF		Stadium: Georgios Kamaras Stadium

=== 2023 ===
7 April 2023 Friendly	Greece	1–1	Croatia	Athens, Greece
12:00 EEST	Spyridonidou 10'	HFF	Rudelić 62'	Stadium: Georgios Kamaras Stadium

10 April 2023 Friendly	Greece	2–1	Croatia	Athens, Greece
11:00 EEST	Spyridonidou 52', 70'	HFF	Gegollaj 43'	Stadium: Georgios Kamaras Stadium

12 July 2023 Friendly	Hungary	1–0	Greece	Budapest , Hungary
19:30 EEST	Turányi 70'	HFF		Stadium: Bozsik Aréna

15 July 2023 Friendly	Greece	3–0	Bosnia and Herzegovina	Telki, Hungary
12:00 EEST	Spyridonidou 55', 57', 64' (pen.)	HFF		Stadium: Telki Training Center

22 September 2023 2023–24 UEFA Women's Nations League	Greece	1–3	Poland	Athens, Greece
20:00 EEST	Markou 24'	UEFA; HFF	Pajor 2'; Padilla 39'; Pawollek 82'	Stadium: Georgios Kamaras Stadium; Referee: Réka Molnar (Hungary)

26 September 2023 2023–24 UEFA Women's Nations League	Serbia	4–0	Greece	Stara Pazova, Serbia
20:00 EEST	Ivanović 16', 44'; Damnjanović 32', 52'	UEFA; HFF		Stadium: Sport Center FAS; Referee: Désirée Grundbacher (Switzerland)

27 October 2023 2023–24 UEFA Women's Nations League	Greece	2–1	Ukraine	Heraklion, Greece
17:00 EEST	Markou 36'; Spyridonidou 72'	UEFA; HFF	Kalinina 3'	Stadium: Theodoros Vardinogiannis Stadium; Referee: Jana van Laere (Belgium)

31 October 2023 2023–24 UEFA Women's Nations League	Ukraine	1–0	Greece	Heraklion, Greece
17:00 EET	Apanashchenko 32'	UEFA; HFF		Stadium: Theodoros Vardinogiannis Stadium; Referee: Veronika Kovarova (Czech Republic)

1 December 2023 2023–24 UEFA Women's Nations League	Greece	0–2	Serbia	Heraklion, Greece
17:00 EET		UEFA; HFF	Mijatović 45'; Poljak 89'	Stadium: Theodoros Vardinogiannis Stadium; Referee: Gamze Durmuş (Turkey)

5 December 2023 2023–24 UEFA Women's Nations League	Poland	2–0	Greece	Sosnowiec, Poland
20:00 EET	Pajor 37'; Kozak 59'	UEFA; HFF		Stadium: Zagłębiowski Park Sportowy; Referee: Jelena Pejković (Croatia

=== 2024 ===
22 February 2024 Friendly	Romania	0–0	Greece	Manavgat, Turkey
15:30 EET		HFF		Stadium: Manavgat Stadium

25 February 2024 Friendly	Turkey	1–2	Greece	Manavgat, Turkey
15:30 EET	Uraz 12'	HFF	Kapnisi 49'; Spyridonidou 90+5'	Stadium: Emirhan Sport Complex

5 April 2024 UEFA Women's Euro 2025 qualifying	Greece	1–0	Faroe Islands	Heraklion, Greece
20:00 EEST	Sarri 55' (pen.)	UEFA; HFF		Stadium: Theodoros Vardinogiannis Stadium; Referee: Rita Vehapi (Kosovo)

9 April 2024 UEFA Women's Euro 2025 qualifying	Andorra	0–3	Greece	Andorra la Vella, Andorra
20:00 EEST		UEFA; HFF	Sarri 45+3' (pen.); Spyridonidou 56'; Gkatsou 67'	Stadium: Estadi Nacional; Referee: Jurgita Mačikunytė (Lithuania)

31 May 2024 UEFA Women's Euro 2025 qualifying	Greece	2–2	Montenegro	Heraklion, Greece
18:00 EEST	Markou 11'; Spyridonidou 49'	UEFA; HFF	Kuč 3'; Bulatović 90+4' (pen.)	Stadium: Theodoros Vardinogiannis Stadium; Referee: Fatemeh Zangeneh (Norway)

4 June 2024 UEFA Women's Euro 2025 qualifying	Faroe Islands	0–2	Greece	Tórshavn, Faroe Islands
18:45 EEST		UEFA; HFF	Sarri 13'; Koggouli 78'	Stadium: Tórsvøllur; Referee: Laura Mauricio (Switzerland)

12 July 2024 UEFA Women's Euro 2025 qualifying	Greece	6–0	Andorra	Heraklion, Greece
20:00 EEST	Koggouli 1', 58'; Sarri 23'; Papadopoulou 69', 79', 89'	UEFA; HFF		Stadium: Theodoros Vardinogiannis Stadium; Referee: Roxana Recorean (Romania)

16 July 2024 UEFA Women's Euro 2025 qualifying	Montenegro	2–3	Greece	Podgorica, Montenegro
20:00 EEST	Bulatović 90+5' (pen.), 90+8' (pen.)	UEFA; HFF	Koggouli 6', 62'; Spyridonidou 24'	Stadium: Camp FSCG; Referee: Karoline Wacker (Germany)

25 October UEFA Women's Euro 2025 qualifying play-offs	Greece	0–0	Belgium	Heraklion, Greece
19:00		UEFA; HFF		Stadium: Theodoros Vardinogiannis Stadium; Attendance: 1,550; Referee: Ainara Acevedo (Spain)

29 October UEFA Women's Euro 2025 qualifying play-offs	Belgium	5–0	Greece	Leuven, Belgium
21:15	Van Kerkhoven 36', 57'; Wullaert 39', 45+4'; Missipo 55'	UEFA; HFF		Stadium: Den Dreef; Attendance: 5,812; Referee: Volha Blotskaya (Belarus

28 November Friendly	Slovakia	2–1	Greece	Senec, Slovakia
18:30	Maťavková 21'; Mazúchová 90+6'	HFF	Spyridonidou 66'	Stadium: NTC Senec; Referee: Milica Milovanović (Serbia)

1 December Friendly	Slovakia	1–2	Greece	Senec, Slovakia
14:00	Fabová 51'	HFF	Koggouli 36', 59'	Stadium: NTC Senec; Referee: Vesna Miletic (Bosnia and Herzegovina)

=== 2025 ===
21 February 2025 UEFA Women's Nations League	Greece	1–2	Slovenia	Heraklion, Greece
18:00	Sarri 26'	UEFA; HFF	Sternad 33'; Kramžar 67'	Stadium: Theodoros Vardinogiannis Stadium; Referee: Nanna Andersen (Denmark)

25 February 2025 UEFA Women's Nations League	Turkey	1–0	Greece	Istanbul, Turkey
18:00	Keskin 33'	UEFA; HFF		Stadium: Pendik Stadium; Referee: Miriama Bočková (Slovakia)

4 April 2025 UEFA Women's Nations – League B – Group 2	Greece	0–4	Republic of Ireland	Heraklion, Greece
17:00 EEST		UEFA; HFF	Sheva 49'; Carusa 61'; Stapleton 74'; Barrett 90+3'	Stadium: Theodoros Vardinogiannis Stadium; Referee: Jelena Pejković (Croatia)

8 April 2025 UEFA Women's Nations – League B – Group 2	Republic of Ireland	2–1	Greece	Dublin, Ireland
21:30 EEST	Barrett 9' (pen.); Patten 50'	UEFA; HFF	Sarri 72'	Stadium: Tallaght Stadium; Referee: Franziska Wildfeuer (Germany)

30 May 2025 UEFA Women's Nations – League B – Group 2	Slovenia	2–0	Greece	Ljubljana, Slovenia
19:00 EEST	Kramžar 24'; Prašnikar 50'	UEFA; HFF		Stadium: Šiška Sports Park; Referee: Réka Molnár (Hungary)

3 June 2025 UEFA Women's Nations – League B – Group 2	Greece	0–1	Turkey	Heraklion, Greece
20:00 EEST		UEFA; HFF	Hançar 42'	Stadium: Theodoros Vardinogiannis Stadium; Referee: Maïka Vanderstichel (France)

26 June Friendly	Belgium	2–0	Greece	Brussels, Belgium
21:15 EEST	Wullaert 24'; Janssens 48'	HFF		Stadium: Edmond Machtens Stadium

29 November Friendly	Belarus	0–2	Greece	Zenica, Bosnia and Herzegovina
16:00 EET		HFF	Pouliou 66'; Brookshire 70'	Stadium: Bosnia and Herzegovina FA Training Centre; Referee: Aida Jusufović (Bosnia and Herzegovina)

2 December Friendly	Bosnia and Herzegovina	1–1	Greece	Zenica, Bosnia and Herzegovina
14:30 EET	Grebenar 60'	HFF	Koggouli 43' (pen.)	Stadium: Bosnia and Herzegovina FA Training Centre

=== 2026 ===
3 March 2027 FIFA Women's World Cup qualification – League C – Group 4	Greece	3–0	Georgia	Heraklion, Greece
18:30 EET	Markou 20'; Brookshire 80'; Tzourtzevits 86'	UEFA; HFF		Stadium: Theodoros Vardinogiannis Stadium; Referee: Lizzy van der Helm (Netherlands)

7 March 2027 FIFA Women's World Cup qualification – League C – Group 4	Greece	2–0	Faroe Islands	Heraklion, Greece
20:30 EET	Sarri 2' (pen.); Sophia Koggouli 78'	UEFA; HFF		Stadium: Theodoros Vardinogiannis Stadium; Referee: Jelena Jermolajeva (Latvia)

14 April 2027 FIFA Women's World Cup qualification – League C – Group 4	Faroe Islands	2–3	Greece	Tórshavn, Faroe Islands
19:00 EEST	Johannesen 9'; Ryan 90+6'	UEFA; HFF	Moraitou 8'; Giannaka 53'; Drakogiannaki 78'	Stadium: Tórsvøllur; Referee: Hanna Laajanen (Sweden)

18 April Friendly	Greece	1–1	Moldova	Athens, Greece
16:00 EEST	Paterna 60'	HFF	Rubanovici 90'	Stadium: Nea Smyrni Stadium; Referee: Roxana Timiș (Romania)

9 June 2027 FIFA Women's World Cup qualification – League C – Group 4	Georgia	2–3	Greece	Tbilisi, Georgia
20:00 EEST	Theodoraki 6' (o.g.); Brame 63' (o.g.)	UEFA; HFF	Chalatsogianni 3'; Theodoraki 22'; Brookshire 60'	Stadium: Mikheil Meskhi Stadium; Referee: Veronika Vasylchenko (Ukraine)

9 October 2027 FIFA Women's World Cup qualification – play-offs	Greece	1–3	England	Heraklion, Greece
19:30 EET	Brookshire 78'	FIFA; UEFA; HFF	Stanway 39'; Le Tissier 63'; Russo 67'	Stadium: Pankritio Stadium; Referee: Martina Molinaro (Italy)

13 October 2027 FIFA Women's World Cup qualification – play-offs	England	5–0	Greece	Leicester, England
20:30 EET	Russo 3', 75'; James 16', 35'; Stanway 30'	FIFA; UEFA; HFF		Stadium: King Power Stadium; Referee: Rasa Grigonė (Lithuania)

== Record by opponent ==
Positive Record Neutral Record Negative Record

Opponents	Pld	W	D	L	GF	GA	GD
Andorra	2	2	0	0	9	0	+9
Belarus	1	1	0	0	2	0	+2
Belgium	3	0	1	2	0	7	-7
Bosnia and Herzegovina	2	1	1	0	4	1	+3
Croatia	2	1	1	0	3	2	+1
Cyprus	2	2	0	0	5	0	+5
England	2	0	0	2	1	8	-7
Estonia	2	2	0	0	6	1	+5
Faroe Islands	4	4	0	0	8	2	+6
France	2	0	0	2	1	15	-14
Georgia	2	2	0	0	6	2	+4
Germany	1	0	0	1	0	6	-6
Hungary	1	0	0	1	0	1	-1
Israel	2	1	1	0	3	2	+1
Kazakhstan	2	2	0	0	4	2	+2
Moldova	1	0	1	0	1	1	0
Montenegro	3	2	1	0	6	4	+2
Poland	2	0	0	2	1	5	-4
Portugal	2	0	0	2	0	5	-5
Republic of Ireland	3	0	0	3	1	7	-6
Romania	1	0	1	0	0	0	0
Serbia	2	0	0	2	0	6	-6
Slovakia	2	1	0	1	3	3	0
Slovenia	4	0	1	3	2	8	-6
Turkey	3	1	0	2	2	3	-1
Ukraine	4	1	0	3	2	10	-8
Wales	2	0	0	2	0	6	-6
Total (27)	57	23	8	27	70	102	-32

== Stats ==
=== Most appearances ===
#	Player	Caps
1	Veatriki Sarri	56
2	Athanasia Moraitou	53
3	Eleni Markou	49
4	Anastasia Spyridonidou	47
5	Eleni Kakambouki	46
5	Sophia Koggouli	46
6	Maria Mitkou	39
7	Maria Paterna	38
8	Maria Palama	35
9	Vasiliki Giannaka	34
10	Grigoria Pouliou	33

=== Most assists ===
#	Player	Assists	Caps
1	Veatriki Sarri	8	56
2	Anastasia Spyridonidou	4	47
3	Maria Mitkou	3	39
3	Markella Koskeridou	3	10
4	Athanasia Moraitou	2	53
4	Calliste Brookshire	2	11
5	12 players	1	—

=== Top goalscorers ===
#	Player	Goals	Caps
1	Anastasia Spyridonidou	16	47
2	Sophia Koggouli	13	46
3	Veatriki Sarri	11	56
4	Eleni Markou	5	49
5	Grigoria Pouliou	4	33
5	Calliste Brookshire	4	11
6	Antigoni Papadopoulou	3	10
7	11 players	1	—

=== Most clean sheets ===
#	Player	Clean sheets	Caps
1	Dimitra Giannakouli	7	18
2	Panagiota Chatzicharistou	5	9
3	Anthi Papakonstantinou	4	9
4	Rafaella Petaloti	3	8
5	Zoi Nasi	2	15
6	Ariana Anastasiadis	1	1
