= Eleni Saich =

Greek footballer

Personal information
- Full name: Eleni-Nikoleta Saich
- Date of birth: 9 February 2001 (age 25)
- Place of birth: Larissa, Greece
- Height: 1.60 m (5 ft 3 in)
- Position: Attacking midfielder

Team information
- Current team: AEK Athens F.C.

Youth career
- 2011–2013: TuRa Niederhöchstadt
- 2013–2018: 1. FFC Frankfurt

Senior career*
Years	Team	Apps	(Gls)
2018–2019	1. FFC Frankfurt III		
2019	PAOK	0	(0)
2019–2022	Aris Thessaloniki		
2022–2024	Kastoria		
2024–2025	Asteras Tripolis	19	(1)
2025–	AEK	23	(2)

International career^{‡}
2019	Greece U19	2	(1)
2024–	Greece	15	(0)
- * Club domestic league appearances and goals as of 27 May 2026 ‡ National team caps and goals as of 27 May 2026

Eleni Saich (Greek: Ελένη Σάιχ; born 9 February 2001) is a Greek footballer who plays as a midfielder for Greek A Division club AEK Athens and has appeared for the Greek national team.

== Club career ==
Eleni Saich started playing football in the Giorgos Plitsis Academy in Larissa. She then moved to Germany where she joined TuRa Niederhöchstadt and later 1.FFC Frankfurt. She played in 1.FFC Frankfurt's academy for 6 years.

On 13 July 2019, Saich returned to Greece to sign for PAOK. She made her Champions League debut a month later against Anderlecht when she came on as a substitute in the 89th minute for Dimitra Karapetsa. That was her only appearance for the club as she later joined their rivals Aris Thessaloniki before the start of the 2019-20 season. After 3 years, she moved to Kastoria GPO where she played until the 2023-24 season.

On 16 July 2024, she joined Asteras Tripolis. She made 21 appearances and scored a goal in a 3–1 win over OFI. Asteras finished 4th in the league and reached the quarterfinals of the cup.

On 21 June 2025, she joined Greek A Division champions AEK. She made 28 appearances in all competitions, helping the club finish second in the league and reach the cup semifinals, while also scoring twice, against Kifisia and Volos.

== International career ==
Eleni Saich was called up for the Greek U19 team and made her debut on 2 October 2019 against Iceland in the 2020 UEFA Women's Under-19 Championship qualification. Five days later, she scored her first goal for the national team against Kazakhstan.

She made her senior team debut on 25 October 2024 against Belgium in the UEFA Women's Euro 2025 qualifying play-offs when she was subbed on in the 56th minute for Markella Koskeridou.

== Honours ==
Aris Thessaloniki

- Greek A Division; runner-up: 2019–20

AEK

- Greek A Division; runner-up: 2025–26

Individual

- PSAPP Best XI (2): 2024–25, 2025–26
