= 2025–26 Greek A Division (women's football) =

37th season of top women's football (soccer) league in Greece

Greek A Division
- Season: 2025–26
- Dates: 20 September 2025 – 17 May 2026
- Champions: PAOK (20th title)
- Relegated: Acharnaikos; Nees Atromitou; Trikala 2011; Volos 2004
- Women's Champions League: PAOK
- Matches: 182
- Goals: 542 (2.98 per match)
- Top goalscorer: Minela Gačanica (23 goals)
- Biggest home win: PAOK 12–0 Nees Atromitou
- Biggest away win: Odysseas Moschatou 0–6 PAOK
- Highest scoring: PAOK 12–0 Nees Atromitou
- Longest winning run: 11 games PAOK
- Longest unbeaten run: 26 games PAOK
- Longest winless run: 26 games Acharnaikos
- Longest losing run: 26 games Acharnaikos
- All statistics correct as of 7 July 2026.

The 2025–26 Greek A Division season is the 37th season of the women's football top-level league in Greece. AEK Athens were the defending champions. PAOK FC were crowned undefeated champions, winning their 20th overall title.

The draw for the league took place on 4 September 2025 in Pallini.

== Teams ==
=== Changes ===
Promoted from 2024 to 2025 Greek B Division	Relegated from 2024–25 Greek A Division
Acharnaikos; Volos 2004; Volos; Odysseas Moschatou	Doxa 2016 (Note: In January 2025, Doxa 2016 withdrew from the competition after many players left the club.); Kastoria

=== Stadiums and locations ===
Locations of the 2025–26 season clubs

Team	City	Stadium	Capacity
Acharnaikos	Acharnes	Acharnes Municipal Stadium	4,450
AEK Athens	Nea Filadelfeia	Agioi Anargyroi Municipal Stadium	5,000
Agia Paraskevi	Agia Paraskevi	Agia Paraskevi Stadium	2,800
Asteras Tripolis	Tripoli	Panarkadikos Stadium	4,000
Kifisia	Kifissia	Kamatero Municipal Stadium	
Nees Atromitou	Peristeri	Chorafa Municipal Stadium	600
Odysseas Moschatou	Moschato	Municipal Stadium of Moschato	900
OFI Crete	Heraklion	Vardinoyianneio Sports Center	1,000
Panathinaikos	Athens	Rouf Municipal Stadium	1,600
PAOK	Thessaloniki	Neoi Epivates Municipal Stadium	3,000
REA	Rethymno	Rethymno Municipal Stadium	1,300
Trikala 2011	Trikala	Trikala Municipal Stadium	15,000
Volos 2004	Volos	Volos Municipal Stadium	9,000
Volos	Volos	Olga Vasdeki Sports Center	

=== Personnel and sponsorship ===
Team	Head coach	Captain	Kit manufacturer	Main shirt sponsor
Acharnaikos	(Greece) Giorgos Papakostoulis	(Greece) Matoula Pithoula	Adidas	None
AEK Athens	(Greece) Thalis Theodoridis	(Greece) Maria Kapnisi	Macron	Seajets
Agia Paraskevi	(Greece) Dimitrios Kalykas	(Greece) Loukia Prifti	Zeus	None
Asteras Tripolis	(Slovakia) Martin Masaryk	(Greece) Anastasia Spyridonidou	Macron	None
Kifisia	(Greece) Dimitris Benetatos	(Greece) Aggeliki Gkoufa	Erima	Real Greek Dairies
Nees Atromitou	(Greece) Kalomoira Kontomichi	(Greece) Katerina Verra		Il Gusto
Odysseas Moschatou	(Greece) Nikos Galitsios	(Greece) Maria Papakosta	Macron	Power Health
OFI Crete	(Greece) Nikolaos Tsagatakis	(Greece) Vasso Kydonaki	Joma	Braden
Panathinaikos	(Greece) Giannis Charalampidis	(Greece) Zoi Nasi	Adidas	Pame Stoixima
PAOK	(Greece) Thanasis Patrikidis	(Greece) Maria Mitkou	Macron	Stoiximan
REA	(Greece) Stelios Kozanidis	(Greece) Kalioppi Vorria	Zeus	MANKA
Trikala 2011	(Greece) Nikos Valomandras	(Greece) Rallou Tsouni	Macron	Trikalini Zymi, Lifewalkers Hydrogym
Volos 2004	(Greece) Dimitris Vlachos	(Greece) Chara Nenne	Playsports	Stager
Volos	(Greece) Eleni Kouskouni	(Greece) Eleni Garyfallidou	Admiral	None

=== Managerial changes ===
Team	Outgoing manager	Manner of departure	Date of vacancy	Position in table	Incoming manager	Date of appointment
Kifisia	(Greece) Thanasis Zygouris (interim)	End of interim spell	24 May 2025	End of season (9th)	(Greece) Giannis Papadopoulos	24 May 2025
Asteras Tripolis	(Greece) Makis Tagtalidis	End of contract	26 May 2025	End of season (4th)	(Slovakia) Martin Masaryk	7 July 2025
PAOK	(Greece) Kostas Konstantinidis	End of contract	19 June 2025	End of season (5th)	(Greece) Thanasis Patrikidis	19 June 2025
Kifisia	(Greece) Giannis Papadopoulos	Contract termination	1 July 2025	—	(Australia) Michalis Eracleous	1 July 2025
OFI	(Greece) Antonis Androulakis	Mutual consent	14 October 2025	5th	(Greece) Danai Sidira (caretaker)	14 October 2025
OFI	(Greece) Danai Sidira (caretaker)	End of tenure as caretaker	7 November 2025	4th	(Greece) Alexandros Katikaridis	7 November 2025
Agia Paraskevi	(Greece) Giannis Charalampidis	Sacked	20 November 2025	10th	(Greece) Dimitrios Kalykas	5 December 2025
Panathinaikos	(Serbia) Dragan Knezevic	Sacked	22 November 2025	7th	(Greece) Giannis Charalampidis	27 November 2025
AEK	(Greece) Nikos Kotsovos	Resigned	28 January 2026	2nd	(Greece) Thalis Theodoridis	29 January 2026
Kifisia	(Australia) Michalis Eracleous	Mutual consent	11 February 2026	10th	(Greece) Dimitris Benetatos (interim)	11 February 2026
OFI	(Greece) Alexandros Katikaridis	Resigned	20 April 2026	4th	(Greece) Nikolaos Tsagatakis (interim)	20 April 2026

=== Foreign players ===
- Clubs were allowed to include only up to six (6) foreign players on the match sheet, and up to six (6) foreign players could participate throughout the duration of the match.
- Player names in **bold** indicate the player was registered during the mid-season transfer window.
- Player names in italics were out of the squad or left the club within the season, after the pre-season transfer window, or in the mid-season transfer window, and at least had one appearance.

Team	Player 1	Player 2	Player 3	Player 4	Player 5	Player 6	Extra players	Former players
Acharnaikos								(Aruba) Aisse Gumbs (United States) Elizabeth Harrington (Puerto Rico) Imani Morlock (Albania) Klarita Myrtollari (Curaçao) Jeleaugh Rosa (United States) Murita Storey
AEK	(United States) **Elizabeth Hill**	(Bulgaria) **Evdokiya Popadinova**	(The Gambia) **Manyima Stevelmans**	(Cyprus) Antri Violari	(Canada) Gabrielle Vivier-Hannay	(Sweden) Astrid Larsson		(Cyprus) Maria Panagiotou
Agia Paraskevi	(Belgium) **Léa Cordier**	(Serbia) Jasna Đorđević	(Venezuela) Nerimar Suárez	(United States) Hannah Kroupa	(Canada) Kendall Showers	(United States) Taiana Tolleson		(North Macedonia) Biljana Paneska
Asteras Tripolis	(Mexico) Jazmin Castañon	(Colombia) Andrea Mendoza	(Cyprus) Eirini Michail	(Latvia) Anastasija Ročāne	(Hungary) Virág Sipőcz	(Kazakhstan) **Angelina Portnova**	(United States) Nya Bacelli	(Angola) Alexandra Soares
Kifisia	(Jordan) Farah Abu Tayeh	(United States) Kate Gibson	(Italy) Francesca Imprezzabile	(United States) Velize King	(Switzerland) Sara Tonelli			
Nees Atromitou	(Australia) **Shivani Battaglia**	(United States) Amanda DaSilva	(United States) Laken Gallman	(Japan) Nanako Kobayashi	(Japan) **Nanami Sone**			(United States) Jacqueline Isensee (United States) Yabeserra Fiesa-Rich (United States) Adrianna Schroeder
Odysseas Moschatou	(United States) **Zoë Hudson**	(United States) Brooke Parnello	(Colombia) Natalia Acuña	(United States) Lauren Bastian	(United States) **Zoë Swift**	(Puerto Rico) Imani Morlock	(Netherlands) **Carolina Wolters**	(Republic of Ireland) Carla McManus (United States) Autumn Weeks
OFI	(Nigeria) Peace Efih	(Angola) **Alexandra Soares**	(Poland) **Joanna Olszewska**	(Cyprus) **Maria Panagiotou**	(Slovakia) Nikolá Rybanska	(England) Elisha Sulola		(Brazil) Pâmela Dutra (Portugal) Paula Fernandes (Netherlands) Shania van Nuland
Panathinaikos	(Serbia) Biljana Bradic	(Aruba) Aisse Gumbs	(Serbia) Biljana Ilić	(Georgia (country)) Mariam Kalandadze	(Serbia) Nikoleta Nikolić	(Bosnia and Herzegovina) Ena Šabanagić		
PAOK	(North Macedonia) Lenche Andreevska	(Bosnia and Herzegovina) Minela Gačanica	(Spain) Marta Llopis	(Brazil) Daniele Neuhaus	(Germany) Samantha Stiglmair	(United States) Samantha Wiehe		
REA	(Spain) Yolanda Bonnín	(United States) Maeve English	(Argentina) Anela Nigito	(France) Léa Renoux	(Andorra) Maria Ruzafa	(Kenya) Topister Situma		
Trikala 2011	(Germany) Selina Boveleth	(Bulgaria) Leonora Zheleva						(Cyprus) Antria Efstratiou (Cyprus) Chara Neofytou
Volos 2004	(Canada) **Sofia Iaderosa**	(Norway) **Karoline Riisnæs**	(El Salvador) Idalia Serrano					(United States) Victoria Hines (United States) Isabella Sabo
Volos	(Colombia) Vennus Pineda	(El Salvador) Karen Reyes	(United States) **Madison Slater**	(United States) Hannah Tillett	(Colombia) Tatiana Vera	(United States) Emma Wakeman		

== League table ==
Pos	Team	Pld	W	D	L	GF	GA	GD	Pts	Qualification or relegation
1	PAOK (C)	26	23	3	0	89	4	+85	72	Qualification for the Champions League qualifiers
2	AEK	26	20	4	2	69	17	+52	64	
3	Asteras Tripolis	26	16	3	7	61	25	+36	51	
4	OFI	26	15	4	7	49	20	+29	49	
5	Panathinaikos	26	14	6	6	43	26	+17	48	
6	REA	26	14	5	7	53	23	+30	47	
7	Agia Paraskevi	26	11	5	10	32	25	+7	38	
8	Odysseas Moschatou	26	10	7	9	32	37	−5	37	
9	Kifisia	26	10	3	13	33	42	−9	33	
10	Volos	26	8	8	10	36	40	−4	32	
11	Volos 2004 (R)	26	4	4	18	14	63	−49	16	Relegation to Greek B Division
12	Nees Atromitou (R)	26	4	4	18	15	76	−61	16	Relegation to Greek B Division
13	AO Trikala 2011 (R)	26	4	2	20	16	68	−52	14	Relegation to Greek B Division
14	Acharnaikos (Note: On 7 October 2025, Acharnaikos withdrew from the competition due to serious administrative issues. They were deducted 9 points by the Disciplinary Committee of the HFF.) (R)	26	0	0	26	0	76	−76	−9	Club withdrew from the league

Source: EPO
Rules for classification: 1) Points; 2) Head-to-head points; 3) Goal difference; 4) Number of goals scored; 5) Head-to-head goal difference; 6) Head-to-head away goals scored
(C) Champions; (R) Relegated

== Results ==
Home \ Away	ACH	AEK	AGI	AST	KIF	NEE	ODY	OFI	PAN	PAO	REA	TRI	VOL	VLS
Acharnaikos	—	0–3^{[a]}	0–3	0–3^{[a]}	0–3^{[a]}	0–3^{[a]}	0–3^{[a]}	0–3^{[a]}	0–3^{[a]}	0–3	0–3^{[a]}	0–3^{[a]}	0–3^{[a]}	0–3^{[a]}
AEK	3–0^{[a]}	—	1–0	5–1	3–0	3–0	3–1	2–1	2–1	0–0	1–0	8–0	6–0	1–1
Agia Paraskevi	3–0^{[a]}	0–3	—	1–2	3–0	4–1	4–0	0–0	0–3	0–0	3–2	2–1	4–1	0–0
Asteras Tripolis	3–0^{[a]}	2–0	0–1	—	1–0	5–1	1–0	2–1	4–0	0–2	0–0	5–0	9–0	4–2
Kifisia	3–0^{[a]}	1–3	2–1	2–4	—	2–0	1–1	0–2	1–3	0–5	1–3	2–0	1–0	1–2
Nees Atromitou	3–0^{[a]}	0–5	0–0	0–4	0–3	—	1–1	0–4	1–2	0–4	0–5	2–1	2–0	0–0
Odysseas Moschatou	3–0^{[a]}	1–1	3–0	2–1	0–0	4–0	—	0–2	0–0	0–6	3–1	3–1	0–1	2–0
OFI	3–0^{[a]}	1–2	2–0	1–1	4–0	3–0	0–0	—	0–1	0–1	1–0	1–0	4–1	3–3
Panathinaikos	1–0	1–2	1–0	3–1	2–0	3–0	0–0	2–1	—	1–3	0–3	4–0	3–1	1–1
PAOK	3–0^{[a]}	4–1	1–0	1–0	3–0	12–0	6–0	3–1	2–0	—	2–1	8–0	4–0	6–0
REA	3–0^{[a]}	1–3	1–0	2–0	2–2	5–0	4–0	1–3	2–2	0–0	—	2–1	5–0	2–0
AO Trikala 2011	3–0^{[a]}	0–5	0–1	0–5	0–1	1–1	0–3	1–2	0–4	0–4	0–2	—	1–1	0–1
Volos 2004	3–0^{[a]}	0–2	0–0	0–0	0–3^{[b]}	2–0	1–2	0–2	0–0	0–5	0–2	0–1	—	0–4
Volos	3–0^{[a]}	1–1	1–2	1–3	0–4	3–0	3–0	0–4	2–2	0–1	1–1	1–2	3–0	—

Source: EPO
Legend: Blue = home team win; Yellow = draw; Red = away team win.

^{a} Acharnaikos withdrew from the league and their remaining matches were awarded to the opposing team.
^{b} The match was cancelled and awarded to Kifisia due to unsuitability of the field.

== Season statistics ==
As of 17 May 2026

=== Goalscorers ===
Rank	Player	Club	Goals
1	(Bosnia and Herzegovina) Minela Gačanica	PAOK	23
2	(Cyprus) Antri Violari	AEK	20
3	(Greece) Grigoria Pouliou	Panathinaikos	16
4	(Greece) Anastasia Spyridonidou	Asteras Tripolis	12
5	(Cyprus) Eirini Michail	Asteras Tripolis	11
6	(Nigeria) Peace Efih	OFI	9
6	(North Macedonia) Lenche Andreevska	PAOK	9
6	(Argentina) Anela Nigito	REA	9
6	(Kenya) Topister Situma	REA	9
6	(Andorra) Maria Ruzafa	REA	9
6	(Greece) Eleni Garyfallidou	Volos	9

=== Assists ===
Rank	Player	Club	Assists
1	(United States) Lauren Bastian	Odysseas Moschatou	10
1	(North Macedonia) Lenche Andreevska	PAOK	10
1	(United States) Samantha Wiehe	PAOK	10
2	(Greece) Anastasia Spyridonidou	Asteras Tripolis	9
2	(Spain) Marta Llopis	PAOK	9
3	(Venezuela) Nerimar Suarez	Agia Paraskevi	8
3	(Greece) Maria Mitkou	PAOK	8
4	(Greece) Fani Doiranli	OFI	7
5	(Greece) Voula Tzoutzouraki	AEK	6
5	(Greece) Ioanna Chamalidou	AEK	6
5	(Greece) Efi Brame	Asteras Tripolis	6

=== Hat-tricks ===
Player	For	Against	Result	Date	Round
(United States) Brooke Parnello	Odysseas Moschatou	Nees Atromitou	4–0 (H)	21 September 2025	1
(Greece) Eleni Garyfallidou	Volos	OFI	3–3 (A)	5 October 2025	3
(Greece) Maria Mitkou^{4}	PAOK	Nees Atromitou	12–0 (H)	19 October 2025	5
(Nigeria) Peace Efih	OFI	REA	3–1 (A)	1 November 2025	6
(Bosnia and Herzegovina) Minela Gačanica	PAOK	Odysseas Moschatou	6–0 (H)	14 March 2026	19

(H) – Home; (A) – Away

Note: ^{4} – player scored 4 goals

=== Clean sheets ===
Rank	Player	Club	Clean sheets
1	(Brazil) Dani Neuhaus	PAOK	21
2	(United States) Taiana Tolleson	Agia Paraskevi	10
3	(Greece) Dimitra Giannakouli	AEK	9
3	(Greece) Zoi Nasi	Panathinaikos	9
4	(United States) Emma Wakeman	Volos	7
5	(Greece) Chrysa Grigoriadou	Asteras Tripolis	6
5	(Greece) Ariana Anastasiadis	Kifisia	6
5	(Greece) Evi Gavriilidou	Odysseas Moschatou	6
5	(Greece) Rafaella Petaloti	OFI	6

=== Discipline ===
	Most yellow cards	Total	Most red cards	Total
Player	(Greece) Efi Brame (Asteras Tripolis) (Greece) Aggeliki Panteri (REA)	9	(Greece) Efi Brame (Asteras Tripolis) (Greece) Aggeliki Panteri (REA)	2
Club	Agia Paraskevi	43	Asteras Tripolis	3

== Awards ==
=== Best Greek Player ===
Winner	Club	Nominees	Source
Grigoria Pouliou	Panathinaikos	Panagiota Argyriou; Eleni Saich	

=== Best Foreign Player ===
Winner	Club	Nominees	Source
(Bosnia and Herzegovina) Minela Gačanica	PAOK	(Cyprus) Antri Violari (Spain) Marta Llopis	

=== Best Goalkeeper ===
Winner	Club	Nominees	Source
(Brazil) Dani Neuhaus	PAOK	(Greece) Zoi Nasi (United States) Taiana Tolleson	

=== Best Young Player ===
Winner	Club	Nominees	Source
(Greece) Panagiota Argyriou	PAOK	(Greece) Konstantina Kostopoulou (Greece) Griselda Tsela	

=== Best Coach ===
Winner	Club	Nominees	Source
(Greece) Thanasis Patrikidis	AEK	(Greece) Stelios Kozanidis (Greece) Elena Kouskouni	

=== Best Greek Female Player Abroad ===
Winner	Club	Nominees	Source
Veatriki Sarri	(England) Birmingham City	Ioanna Papatheodorou; Calliste Brookshire	

=== Team of the Season ===
PSAPP Best XI
Goalkeeper	(Brazil) Dani Neuhaus (PAOK)			
Defenders	(Greece) Maria Paterna (OFI)	(Greece) Maria Gkouni (PAOK)	(Greece) Anastasia Gkatsou (Asteras Tripolis)	(Greece) Maria Mitkou (PAOK)
Midfielders	(North Macedonia) Lenche Andreevska (PAOK)	(Greece) Eleni Saich (AEK)	(Spain) Marta Llopis (PAOK)	(Greece) Panagiota Argyriou (PAOK)
Forwards	(Bosnia and Herzegovina) Minela Gačanica (PAOK)		(Greece) Grigoria Pouliou (Panathinaikos)	
