= Panagiota Argyriou =

Greek footballer (born 2008)

Personal information
- Date of birth: 23 February 2008 (age 18)
- Place of birth: Attali, Euboea, Greece
- Height: 1.63 m (5 ft 4 in)
- Position: Left winger

Team information
- Current team: PAOK FC
- Number: 22

Youth career
- Kyzikos Neas Artakis

Senior career*
Years	Team	Apps	(Gls)
2020–2022	Avantes Chalkidas	14	(1)
2022–2023	Olympiada Ymittou	20	(3)
2023–	PAOK	64	(13)

International career^{‡}
2023–2025	Greece U17	13	(0)
2025–	Greece U19	8	(4)
2025–	Greece	4	(0)
- * Club domestic league appearances and goals as of 8 November 2026 ‡ National team caps and goals as of 8 November 2026

Panagiota Argyriou (Greek: Παναγιώτα Αργυρίου, born 23 February 2008) is a Greek footballer who plays as a winger for PAOK in the Greek A Division and the Greece national team.

== Club career ==
Panagiota Argyriou began playing football at the boys' academy of Kyzikos Neas Artakis. On 21 September 2020, aged 12, she joined Avantes Chalkidas. The 2020–21 season was postponed until April 2021 due to the COVID-19 pandemic. Argyriou made three appearances during the season, all as a substitute, including the final against PAOK, in which she replaced Anastasia Tzaferi in added time. The following season, she scored her first league goal in a 6–0 victory over Agia Paraskevi. She made 11 appearances during the campaign as Avantes finished top of their group for the second consecutive season, qualifying for the play-offs, where they finished third. Until that point in her career, Argyriou had played in several defensive positions, as well as on both wings, but had primarily featured as a defensive midfielder. In the summer of 2022, she renewed her contract with Avantes Chalkidas. However, following administrative problems, she and the rest of the squad left the club. A few days later, she joined Olympiada Ymittou. She was a regular member of the team, having been moved into a central or attacking midfielder role.

On 12 July 2023, aged 15, Argyriou signed for Greek champions PAOK. In her debut season, she scored four goals in 22 appearances as the club won both the league and the Greek Cup. She also featured in the 2024 Greek Cup final, replacing Thomai Vardali in the 75th minute. In the 2024–25 season, she made 23 appearances as PAOK finished fifth in the league, their lowest-ever placing, and were eliminated in the semi-finals of the cup. The following season, Argyriou was given a more attacking role, featuring primarily on the left wing. She enjoyed a breakthrough campaign, recording six goals and five assists in 26 appearances. Among her goals were a header against defending champions AEK and a volley against Panathinaikos, which was described as a "masterpiece" by ERT. PAOK won the league and the cup, with Argyriou starting in the 2025–26 Greek Cup final. At the 2026 PSAPP Awards, she received the Best Young Player award for her performances during the 2025–26 season. She made her UWCL debut against Hapoel Jerusalem. She scored three goals in six appearances during PAOK's European campaign: against Neftçi and Ferencváros in the Champions League, and against Spartak Myjava in the second leg of their Europa Cup tie.

== International career ==
Panagiota Argyriou has represented the Greece under-17 team in three UEFA Women's Under-17 Championship qualifying campaigns between 2023 and 2025. She has also captained the Greece under-19 team, scoring four goals in six appearances during the 2026 UEFA Women's Under-19 Championship qualification.

She made her senior international debut, aged 17, in a friendly against Belarus on 29 November 2025, replacing Ioanna Papatheodorou in the 79th minute. She has since made substitute appearances in 2027 FIFA Women's World Cup qualification matches against the Faroe Islands and England.

== Career statistics ==
As of 8 November 2026

Appearances and goals by club, season and competition
Club	Season	League			National Cup (Note: Includes Greek Cup)		Continental (Note: Includes UEFA Women's Champions League and UEFA Women's Europa Cup)		Total	
Club	Season	Division	Apps	Goals	Apps	Goals	Apps	Goals	Apps	Goals
Avantes Chalkidas	2020–21	Greek A Division	3	0	–		–		3	0
Avantes Chalkidas	2021–22	Greek A Division	11	1	–		–		11	1
Avantes Chalkidas	Total		14	1	–		–		14	1
Olympiada Ymittou	2022–23	Greek A Division	20	3	–		–		20	3
PAOK	2023–24	Greek A Division	18	3	4	1	0	0	22	4
PAOK	2024–25	Greek A Division	19	2	4	0	0	0	23	2
PAOK	2025–26	Greek A Division	21	6	5	0	–		26	6
PAOK	2026–27	Greek A Division	6	2	0	0	6	3	12	5
PAOK	Total		64	13	13	1	6	3	83	17
Career Total			98	17	13	1	6	3	117	21

== Honours ==
=== Club ===
Avantes Chalkidas

- Greek A Division; runner-up: 2020–21

PAOK

- Greek A Division (2): 2023–24, 2025–26
- Greek Cup (2): 2024, 2025–26

=== Individual ===
- PSAPP Best Young Player: 2025–26
- PSAPP Best XI: 2025–26
