= Dimitra Karapetsa =

Greek footballer (born 2000)

Personal information
- Date of birth: 2 January 2000 (age 26)
- Place of birth: Serres, Greece
- Height: 1.63 m (5 ft 4 in)
- Position: Center back

Team information
- Current team: Aris Limassol
- Number: 14

Youth career
- 2006–2009: Amphipoli
- 2009–2011: Ofrynio
- 2011–2013: Ermis Kalamarias

Senior career*
Years	Team	Apps	(Gls)
2013–2014	Panserraiki		
2014–2018	Amazones Dramas		
2018–2021	PAOK	35	(2)
2021–	Aris Limassol	76	(10)

International career^{‡}
2015–2016	Greece U17	9	(4)
2016–2018	Greece U19	8	(0)
2021–	Greece	7	(0)
- * Club domestic league appearances and goals as of 29 May 2026 ‡ National team caps and goals as of 29 May 2026

Dimitra Karapetsa (Greek: Δήμητρα Καραπέτσα; born 2 January 2000) is a Greek professional footballer who plays as a center back for Cypriot First Division club Aris Limassol FC and the Greece women's national team. She previously played for Amazones Dramas and PAOK.

== Honours ==
=== Club ===
Amazones Dramas

- Greek Cup; runner-up: 2016

PAOK

- Greek A Division (3): 2018–19, 2019–20, 2020–21

Aris Limassol

- Cypriot First Division; runner-up: 2024–25, 2025–26

=== Individual ===
- PASP Women's Best 11: 2021–22, 2022–23

== Personal life ==
Karapetsa hails from Nea Kerdylia, Serres.
