= Rafaella Petaloti =

Greek footballer

Personal information
- Full name: Rafailia-Dimitra Petaloti
- Date of birth: 8 November 2007 (age 18)
- Place of birth: Greece
- Position: Goalkeeper

Team information
- Current team: Moncalieri Calcio

Youth career
- 2019–2021: Agrotikos Asteras
- 2024–2025: Sassuolo

Senior career*
Years	Team	Apps	(Gls)
2021–2022	Agrotikos Asteras		
2022–2023	AEL	3	(0)
2023–2024	Olympiada Ymittou		
2025	SCR Altach	2	(0)
2026	OFI	11	(0)
2026–	Moncalieri		

International career^{‡}
2022–2023	Greece U17	8	(0)
2023–	Greece U19	12	(0)
2025–	Greece	7	(0)
- * Club domestic league appearances and goals as of 25 August 2026 ‡ National team caps and goals as of 12 May 2026

Rafaella Petaloti (Greek: Ραφαέλλα Πεταλωτή, born 8 November 2007) is a Greek footballer currently playing as a goalkeeper for Moncalieri in the Serie B and the Greece national football team.

== Club career ==
Rafaella Petaloti started playing football at the age of six in boys' academies. In 2019, she joined the girls' youth team of Agrotikos Asteras and made her debut for the senior team in the Greek A Division in a 5–1 loss against Kastoria on 16 October 2021. She made a few appearances during the season, primarily serving as a backup goalkeeper. On 30 January 2022, she started in a match against Doxa Dramas but was sent off in the 31st minute after handling the ball outside the penalty area. Agrotikos Asteras finished last in their group and were relegated to the second division.

On 14 October 2022, Petaloti transferred to fellow Greek A Division club AEL. She served as the second–choice goalkeeper after Christina Margariti. She only made three appearances, coming on as a substitute in matches against PAOK, Trikala 2011 and Volos 2004. On 1 February 2023, she moved to Olympiada Ymittou. She was the club's starting keeper during the one-and-a-half seasons she spent in Athens. She helped the team finish second in the play-out round of the 2022–23 season, securing their place in the top division. However, in the 2023–24 season, the number of relegated teams increased to five, and despite finishing 11th out of 14 teams, Olympiada dropped to the second tier.

In the summer of 2024, Petaloti was announced as a signing for Kastoria, but the transfer ultimately collapsed and she instead joined the under-19 team of Sassuolo on 5 October 2024. After a season in Italy, during which the club finished fourth in the Campionato Primavera 1, she moved to ÖFB Bundesliga club SCR Altach. She made her debut in a 4–2 loss against Red Bull Salzburg, playing the full 90 minutes, and also came off the bench in a 6–2 win over Südburgenland/Hartberg. She also made a few appearances for the reserve team, playing the first half in four matches and keeping three clean sheets. On 10 January 2025, she returned to Greece to sign for OFI. She was brought in as the replacement for first-choice goalkeeper Shania van Nuland who had left the club at the end of 2025. Petaloti made 11 appearances, keeping 6 clean sheets, as OFI finished fourth in the league.

On 24 August 2026, Petaloti signed for Moncalieri who were just promoted for the first time to the Italian Serie B.

== International career ==
Rafaella Petaloti made eight appearances for the Greece U17 football team, keeping four clean sheets, including two in the 2023 UEFA Women's Under-17 Championship qualification against Lithuania and the Faroe Islands. She also represented the Greece U19 national team on 12 occasions and was the team's first-choice goalkeeper during the 2024 UEFA Women's Under-19 Championship qualification campaign, keeping three clean sheets. She remains eligible for the under-19 team, having made her most recent appearance on 25 October 2025 against England in the 2025 UEFA Women's Under-19 Championship qualification.

Petaloti made her debut with the senior team on 30 May 2025 against Slovenia in the 2025 UEFA Women's Nations League. As of April 2026, she has started in seven matches and has kept three clean sheets. She has been the main keeper for Greece in the 2027 FIFA Women's World Cup qualification campaign.
