= Chara Neofytou =

Cypriot footballer

Personal information
- Date of birth: 18 January 1996 (age 30)
- Position: Defender

Team information
- Current team: AO Trikala 2011

Senior career*
Years	Team	Apps	(Gls)
2008–2014	Apollon Ladies FC		
2011–2012	→ Dafni Troulloi (loan)		
2015–2017	Aris Thessalonikis		
2017–2018	Amazones Dramas		
2018–2019	AEL		
2019–2020	Avantes Chalkidas		
2020–2021	Chieti Calcio		
2021–2022	Avantes Chalkidas		
2022–2023	Atromitos	16	(5)
2023–2025	Asteras Tripolis	16	(3)
2025	Kastoria		
2025–2026	Trikala 2011	5	(0)

International career^{‡}
2013–2014	Cyprus U19	6	(0)
2019–	Cyprus	6	(0)
- * Club domestic league appearances and goals as of 4 June 2026 ‡ National team caps and goals as of 8 December 2023

Chara Neofytou (Greek: Χαρά Νεοφύτου; born 18 January 1996) is a Cypriot footballer who plays as a defender for Greek A Division club Trikala and the Cyprus women's national team.

== International career ==
Neofytou capped for Cyprus at senior level six matches since 2019.

== Honours ==
Apollon

- Cypriot First Division (6): 2008/09, 2009/10, 2010/11, 2011/12, 2012/13, 2013/14
- Cypriot Cup (6): 2008/09, 2009/10, 2010/11, 2011/12, 2012/13, 2013/14
- Cypriot Super Cup (5): 2009, 2010, 2011, 2013, 2014
