= Gisela Arrieta =

Colombian football player and manager (born 1987)

Personal information
- Full name: Gisela Lisbeth Arrieta Betancourt
- Date of birth: 16 April 1987 (age 39)
- Place of birth: Valledupar, Colombia
- Height: 1.65 m (5 ft 5 in)
- Positions: Midfielder; forward

Team information
- Current team: Volos F.C.
- Number: 11

Youth career
- 1992–1999: Gaviotas
- 2000–2004: Selección Cesar
- 2005–2007: Selección Tolima
- 2006–2007: Escuela Carlos Sarmiento Lora

College career
| Years | Team | Apps | (Gls) |
| 2009–2012 | Graceland Yellowjackets | 70 | (72) |

Senior career*
| Years | Team | Apps | (Gls) |
| 2007 | UCAB Spirit | | |
| 2008 | Dragonas Oriente | | |
| 2016–2018 | Houston Aces | | |
| 2016–2018 | Elpides Karditsas | | |
| 2018–2021 | PAOK | | |
| 2021–2022 | Asteras Rethymnou | 8 | (10) |
| 2022–2023 | REA | 18 | (16) |
| 2023–2024 | AO Trikala 2011 | 14 | (9) |
| 2025–2026 | SFK 2000 | 17 | (12) |
| 2026– | Volos | | |

International career^{‡}
| 2005–2006 | Colombia U20 | | |
| 2005–2010 | Colombia | 4+ | (0+) |

Managerial career
- 2013–2016: Graceland Yellowjackets Women (assistant)
- 2023–2024: Houston Aces (assistant)
- * Club domestic league appearances and goals as of 22 July 2026 ‡ National team caps and goals as of 17 November 2010.

Gisela Lisbeth Arrieta Betancourt (born 16 April 1987) is a Colombian footballer who plays as a midfielder and a forward for Greek A Division club Volos F.C. and the Colombia national team.

== College career ==
Arrieta attended Graceland University in the United States.

== Club career ==
Arrieta has played for UCAB Spirit in Venezuela, for Dragonas Oriente in Mexico, for Houston Aces in the United States and for Elpides Karditsas and PAOK in Greece. At the beginning of the 2025–2026 season she signed for the Bosnia and Herzegovina champions, SFK 2000 Sarajevo.

== International career ==
Arrieta capped for Colombia at senior level during two Bolivarian Games editions (2005 and 2009) and two Copa América Femenina editions (2006 and 2010).

== Managerial career ==
During her time as a player in Mexico, Arrieta also coached the Instituto Oriente Arboleda. In 2013, after graduating from Graceland University, she became the women's team assistant coach.

== Honours ==
Dragones Oriente

- Campeón de Campeones (1): 2008

Graceland Yellowjackets

- HAAC women's soccer tournament (3): 2009, 2010, 2012

Houston Aces

- United Women's Soccer (1): 2018

PAOK

- Greek A Division (3): 2018–19, 2019–20, 2020–21

SFK 2000

- Bosnia and Herzegovina Premier League (1): 2025–26
- Bosnia and Herzegovina Football Cup (1): 2025–26

Colombia

- Bolivarian Games (1): 2009

Individual

- All–HAAC First Team: 2011, 2012
- HAAC Player of the Year: 2011
- HAAC Offensive Player of the Year: 2011
- NAIA All-America Second Team: 2012
- UWS Golden Boot Award: 2018
- UWS All-League First Team: 2018
- UWS Southwest Conference First Team: 2018
- UWS Southwest Conference Offensive Player: 2018
