= Maria Mitkou =

Greek footballer

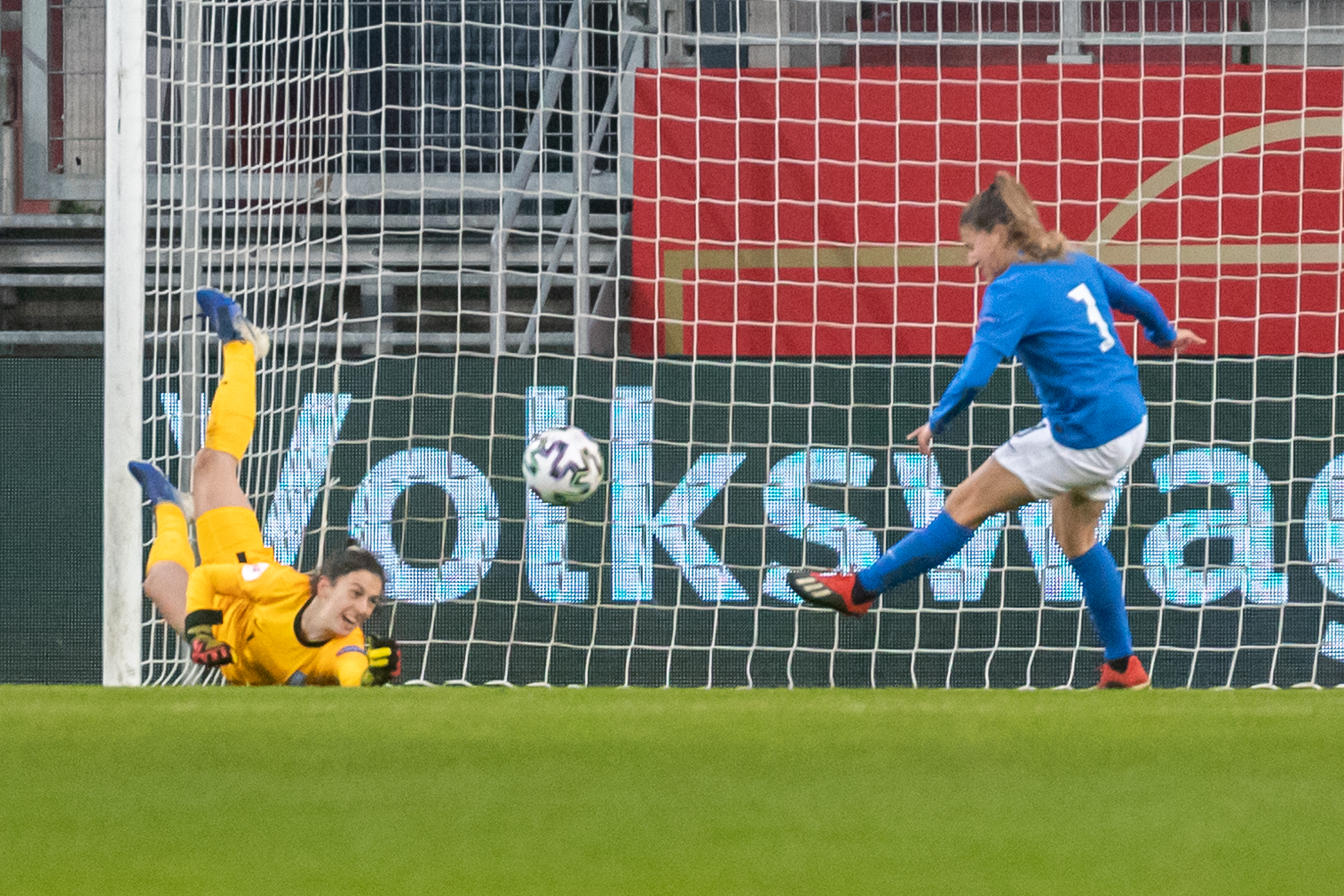
- Maria Mitkou during the International Women´s Friendly match between Portugal and Greece on June 22, 2022 in Lisbon, Portugal.

Personal information
- Full name: Maria Mitkou
- Date of birth: 11 April 1994 (age 32)
- Place of birth: Thessaloniki, Greece
- Height: 1.58 m (5 ft 2 in)
- Position: Midfielder

Team information
- Current team: PAOK
- Number: 17

Senior career*
Years	Team	Apps	(Gls)
2007–2008	Ilioupoli		
2008–2011	Aris Thessaloniki		
2011–2018	Amazones Dramas		
2018–	PAOK	136	(45)

International career^{‡}
2010	Greece U17	3	(2)
2010–2013	Greece U19	12	(3)
2010–	Greece	69	(5)
- * Club domestic league appearances and goals as of 29 May 2026 ‡ National team caps and goals as of 29 May 2026

Maria Mitkou (born 11 April 1994) is a Greek football midfielder currently playing for PAOK Thessaloniki in the Greek A Division and Greece women's national team.

She has represented Greece at the U17 and U19 levels. In April 2012 she scored her first official goal for the senior team against Macedonia at age 17.

== International goals ==
No.	Date	Venue	Opponent	Score	Result	Competition
1.	4 April 2012	Nea Smyrni Stadium, Athens, Greece	North Macedonia	1–1	2–2	UEFA Women's Euro 2013 qualifying
2.	21 February 2022	Pampeloponnisiako Stadium, Patras, Greece	Israel	2–1	2–2	Friendly

== Honours ==
=== Club ===
Amazones Dramas

- Greek A Division (1): 2013–14

PAOK

- Greek A Division (7): 2018–19, 2019–20, 2020–21, 2021–22, 2022–23, 2023–24, 2025–26
- Greek Cup (2): 2024, 2025–26

=== Individual ===
- PSAPP Best Greek Player: 2023–24
- PSAPP Best XI (3): 2023–24, 2024–25, 2025–26
