= Markella Koskeridou =

Greek footballer (born 2000)

Personal information
- Full name: Markella-Dimitra Koskeridou
- Date of birth: 15 May 2000 (age 26)
- Place of birth: Thessaloniki, Greece
- Height: 1.70 m (5 ft 7 in)
- Position: Defender

Team information
- Current team: PAOK FC
- Number: 27

Youth career
- 2012–2017: Hamburger SV

College career
Years	Team	Apps	(Gls)
2021	UNC Wilmington Seahawks	5	(0)

Senior career*
Years	Team	Apps	(Gls)
2017–2023	Hamburger SV	25	(2)
2022–2023	Hamburger SV II	7	(3)
2023–	PAOK	58	(3)

International career^{‡}
2024–	Greece	10	(0)
- * Club domestic league appearances and goals as of 29 May 2026 ‡ National team caps and goals as of 29 May 2026

Markella Koskeridou (born 15 May 2000) is a Greek professional footballer who plays as a defender for PAOK and the Greek national team.

== Club career ==
=== Hamburg ===
When Markella Koskeridou was 12, her family moved from Thessaloniki to Norderstedt in Germany. In 2012, she joined the Hamburger SV academy and, in 2017, she was promoted to the senior team, which played in the Oberliga Hamburg. In the 2018–19 season, they finished undefeated at the top of the table, winning promotion to the Regionalliga Nord. She played in Germany's third division for four years until 2023. In her final season, Hamburg won promotion to the 2. Frauen-Bundesliga by finishing first in their division. In the 2022–23 season, she also played for the reserve team, helping them win the Oberliga Hamburg.

=== UNC Wilmington Seahawks ===
At the start of the 2021–22 season, Koskeridou moved to North Carolina to spend a semester studying at the UNC Wilmington where she also joined their women's soccer team. She made five appearances, helping them finish first in the CAA Regular Season championship.

=== PAOK ===
On 4 September 2023, Koskeridou returned to Greece to join PAOK, the reigning Greek A Division champions. In her debut season, she made 23 appearances as the team won both the league and the 2024 Greek Cup. She scored in her UEFA Women's Champions League debut on 4 September 2024 against Kiryat Gat, but PAOK was eliminated in the next game against Servette. In the 2024–25 season, she made 25 total appearances, scoring three goals. The following season, she made 24 appearances, but her campaign was cut short after she suffered an ACL injury to her right knee during a national team match against the Faroe Islands on 14 April 2026. PAOK went on to complete an unbeaten domestic double, with Koskeridou having played a key role in the club's success prior to her injury.

== International career ==
Markella Koskeridou made her debut for the Greek national football team on 12 July 2024 against Andorra in the 2025 UEFA Women's Euro qualifying. She has also participated in the 2025 UEFA Women's Nations League.

== Career statistics ==
=== College ===
Team	Season	NCAA Regular Season			CAA Tournament		NCAA Tournament		Total	
Team	Season	Division	Apps	Goals	Apps	Goals	Apps	Goals	Apps	Goals
UNC Wilmington Seahawks	2021	Div. I	5	0	0	0	—		5	0

=== Club ===
Appearances and goals by club, season and competition
Club	Season	League			National Cup		Continental		Total	
Club	Season	Division	Apps	Goals	Apps	Goals	Apps	Goals	Apps	Goals
Hamburger SV	2017–18	Oberliga Hamburg	?	?	0	0	—		?	?
Hamburger SV	2018–19	Oberliga Hamburg	?	?	—		—		?	?
Hamburger SV	2019–20	Regionalliga Nord	4	0	0	0	—		4	0
Hamburger SV	2020–21	Regionalliga Nord	2	0	—		—		2	0
Hamburger SV	2021–22	Regionalliga Nord	12	2	2	0	—		14	2
Hamburger SV	2022–23	Regionalliga Nord	7	0	1	0	—		8	0
Hamburger SV	Total		25	2	3	0	—		28	2
Hamburger SV II	2022–23	Oberliga Hamburg	7	3	—		—		7	3
PAOK	2023–24	Greek A Division	19	1	4	0	—		23	1
PAOK	2024–25	Greek A Division	19	1	4	1	2	1	25	3
PAOK	2025–26	Greek A Division	20	1	4	0	—		24	1
PAOK	Total		58	3	12	1	2	1	72	5
Career total			90	8	15	1	2	1	107	10

== Honours ==
Hamburger SV

- Regionalliga Nord (1): 2022–23
- Oberliga Hamburg (2): 2018–19, 2022–23

UNC Wilmington

- CAA Regular Season (1): 2021

PAOK

- Greek A Division (2): 2023–24, 2025–26
- Greek Cup (2): 2024, 2025–26
