= Glykeria Gkatzogianni =

Greek footballer

Personal information
- Date of birth: 20 January 1987 (age 39)
- Place of birth: Trikala, Greece
- Position: Midfielder

Senior career*
Years	Team	Apps	(Gls)
2001–2004	Elpides Karditsas		
2004–2007	Doxa Trilofou		
2007–2015	PAOK		
2015–2016	Trikala		
2016–2017	AEL		
2017–2018	Elpides Karditsas		
2020–2021	Ialysos		
2022	Ialysos		

International career^{‡}
2009–2012	Greece	15	(1)

Managerial career
- 2020–2021: Agrotikos Asteras
- 2022–2024: Agia Paraskevi
- * Club domestic league appearances and goals as of 5 August 2024 ‡ National team caps and goals as of 13 September 2014

Glykeria Gkatzogianni (Greek: Γλυκερία Γκατζογιάννη; born 20 January 1987) is a Greek former footballer who played as a midfielder. Now she is the head coach of Agia Paraskevi WFC. She has been a member of the Greece women's national team. She has an UEFA C licence.
