= Anthi Papakonstantinou =

Greek footballer

Personal information
- Date of birth: 13 September 1995 (age 31)
- Place of birth: Thessaloniki, Greece
- Position: Goalkeeper

Team information
- Current team: Aris Limassol
- Number: 13

Youth career
- 2008-2011: PAOK

Senior career*
Years	Team	Apps	(Gls)
2011-2021	PAOK		
2021–	Aris Limassol	50	(0)

International career^{‡}
2010–2011	Greece U17	6	(0)
2011–2013	Greece U19	12	(0)
2014–	Greece	10	(0)
- * Club domestic league appearances and goals as of 22 February 2025 ‡ National team caps and goals as of 18 June 2023

Anthi Papakonstantinou (born 13 September 1995) is a Greek footballer who plays as a goalkeeper for First Division club Aris Limassol and the Greece women's national team.

== Honours ==
PAOK

- A Division(9): 2012, 2013, 2015, 2016, 2017, 2018, 2019, 2020, 2021
- Greek Cup(5): 2013, 2014, 2015, 2016, 2017
