= Idalia Serrano =

Salvadoran footballer (born 1999)

Personal information
- Full name: Idalia Ester Serrano Franco
- Date of birth: 22 August 1999 (age 27)
- Place of birth: Fresno, California, U.S.
- Height: 1.60 m (5 ft 3 in)
- Position: Goalkeeper

Team information
- Current team: Volos F.C.

Youth career
- Mendota Aztecs
- Sacramento United
- Santa Clara Sporting

College career
Years	Team	Apps	(Gls)
2018–2021	UCLA Bruins	0	(0)
2022–2023	Utah Valley Wolverines	21	(0)

Senior career*
Years	Team	Apps	(Gls)
2024–2026	Volos 2004	39	(0)
2026–	Volos		

International career^{‡}
2021–	El Salvador	15	(0)
Medal record
Women's football
Representing El Salvador
Central American and Caribbean Games
Bronze medal – third place	2023 San Salvador
- * Club domestic league appearances and goals as of 2 August 2026 ‡ National team caps and goals as of 19 November 2021.

Idalia Ester Serrano Franco (born 22 August 1999) is a footballer who plays as a goalkeeper for Greek A Division club Volos F.C.. Born in the United States, she represents the El Salvador national team.

== Early life ==
Serrano was born in Fresno, California and raised in Mendota, California.

== High school and college career ==
Serrano has attended the Mendota High School in her hometown and the University of California, Los Angeles in Los Angeles, California.

== Club career ==
Serrano is a product of Sacramento United and Santa Clara Sporting in the United States.

On 5 August 2024, Serrano joined Greek B Division side Volos 2004. She made 17 appearances in goal as the club won their group and were promoted to the first division. In the 2025–26 season, she kept five clean sheets in 22 matches, however Volos 2004 were ultimately relegated. On 2 August 2025, she transferred to neighbouring club Volos FC.

== International career ==
Serrano made her senior debut for El Salvador on 19 November 2021.

== See also ==
- List of El Salvador women's international footballers
