= Alexandros Katikaridis =

Greek football manager

Personal information
- Date of birth: 3 June 1971 (age 55)
- Place of birth: Polichni, Thessaloniki, Greece

Team information
- Current team: Asteras Tripolis WFC (manager)

Senior career*
Years	Team	Apps	(Gls)
- Anagennisi Neapolis
- ILTEX Lykoi

Managerial career
- 2013–2016: PAOK WFC
- 2016–2017: APE Langadas
- 2017–2018: Foinikas Polichni
- 2018: APE Langadas
- 2018–2019: Kilkisiakos
- 2019–2020: Foinikas Polichni
- 2020–2022: Greece women (assistant)
- 2023–2025: Greece women
- 2025–2026: OFI WFC
- 2026–: Asteras Tripolis WFC
- * Club domestic league appearances and goals as of 8 July 2026

Alexandros Katikaridis (Greek: Aλέξανδρος Κατηκαρίδης; born 3 June 1971 in Polichni Thessalonikis) is a Greek football manager and former footballer who played in amateur and professional level. He is the head coach of Asteras Tripolis in the Greek A Division.

Katikaridis was born, grew up and lives in Polichni, a suburb of the Thessaloniki Urban Area. He is originally from Agios Vartholomaios, Florina. He has played professionally for Anagennisi Neapolis and ILTEX Lykoi.He was the head coach of the Greece women's national football team.

== Managerial career ==
Alexandros Katikaridis worked in the academies of Iraklis from 2005 to 2010 and Proteas from 2010 to 2016. In September 2013, he became the head coach of PAOK's women's team. He helped them win two league titles and three cup titles. In the 2015–16 season, they reached the round of 32 of the UEFA Women's Champions League.

On 28 October 2016, he joined APE Langadas in the Greek third division. They finished third in their group and reached the quarterfinals of the Third Division Cup. In the 2017–18 season, he joined his hometown club Foinikas Polichni and helped them win the Macedonia FCA A Division. On 20 March 2018, he returned to APE Langadas, but only managed the last two games of the season before leaving in the summer. On 5 November 2018, he signed for Kilkisiakos. He helped them win the Kilkis FCA A1 Division and get promoted to the third division. On 8 October 2019, he returned to Foinikas Polichni. They finished 11th in the Macedonia FCA A1 Division.

On 8 September 2020, Alexandros Katikaridis became the assistant coach of the Greek women's national team. Together with Georgios Kyriazis, they managed the national team in the 2022 Euro qualifying and the 2023 World Cup qualifying. On 17 January 2023, he replaced Kyriazis as the new head coach of the national team. He has led Greece in the 2023–24 Nations League and the 2025 Euro qualifying.

On 7 November 2025, he returned to coaching women’s club football, taking over OFI. He stayed in Heraklion for five months, during which he kept the club in fourth place in the league, before resigning in April due to personal reasons.. On 8 July 2026, he signed for Asteras Tripolis.

== Managerial statistics ==
As of 8 July 2026

Team	From	To	Record				
Team	From	To	P	W	D	L	Win %
(Greece) PAOK WFC	September 2013	14 July 2016	71	59	7	5	83.10
(Greece) APE Langadas	28 October 2016	28 November 2017	35	20	4	11	57.14
(Greece) Foinikas Polichni	2017	2018					
(Greece) APE Langadas	20 March 2018	30 June 2018	2	2	0	0	100.00
(Greece) Kilkisiakos	5 November 2018	2019	24	17	6	1	70.83
(Greece) Foinikas Polichni	8 October 2019	2020	18	8	2	8	44.44
Greece	17 January 2023	6 August 2025	29	10	4	15	34.48
(Greece) OFI WFC	7 November 2025	20 April 2026	16	8	3	5	50.00
(Greece) Asteras Tripolis WFC	8 July 2026	present					
Total			195	124	26	45	63.59

== Honours ==
=== Manager ===
PAOK WFC

- Greek A Division (2): 2014/15, 2015/16
- Greek Cup (3): 2014, 2015, 2016

Foinikas Polichni

- Macedonia FCA A Division (1): 2017/18

Kilkisiakos

- Kilkis FCA A1 Division (1): 2018/19
