= Dani Neuhaus =

Brazilian footballer (born 1993)

Personal information
- Full name: Daniele Neuhaus Turnes
- Date of birth: 21 March 1993 (age 33)
- Place of birth: Santo Amaro da Imperatriz, Brazil
- Height: 1.78 m (5 ft 10 in)
- Position: Goalkeeper

Team information
- Current team: PAOK
- Number: 1

Youth career
- Scorpions de Florianópolis

Senior career*
Years	Team	Apps	(Gls)
2010–2012	Foz Cataratas FC		
2013–2015	Vitória das Tabocas	20	(0)
2015–2018	Santos FC	28	(0)
2018–2021	Benfica	38	(0)
2021–2023	Famalicão	14	(0)
2023–	PAOK	56	(0)

International career^{‡}
2017–	Brazil	3	(0)
- * Club domestic league appearances and goals as of 4 June 2026 ‡ National team caps and goals as of 17 February 2023

Daniele "Dani" Neuhaus Turnes (born 21 March 1993) is a Brazilian professional footballer who plays as a goalkeeper for Greek club PAOK and the Brazil women's national team.

== Club career ==
As a talented childhood volleyball player, Neuhaus found that she could use some of the same skills as a football goalkeeper. She began her football career with Scorpions de Florianópolis, where she was noticed by youth national team scouts. This brought her to the attention of bigger clubs and she played for Foz Cataratas and Vitória das Tabocas, before joining Santos in April 2015.

In January 2018, Neuhaus was announced as the first ever signing for S.L. Benfica's newly formed women's football team. She left Benfica at the end of her contract in June 2021, having collected Second Division, First Division and Portuguese Cup winners' medals. Three weeks later she joined Famalicão, who were coached by her compatriot Jorge Barcellos.

== International career ==
Neuhaus represented Brazil's youth team at the inaugural 2008 FIFA U-17 Women's World Cup in New Zealand and at the 2010 FIFA U-17 Women's World Cup in Trinidad and Tobago. After graduating to the under-20 team, she played at the 2012 FIFA U-20 Women's World Cup.

National coach Emily Lima called Neuhaus into the senior Brazil squad for the first time in June 2017. At the following month's 2017 Tournament of Nations, she played in Brazil's third and final game, a 6–1 defeat by Australia. Neuhaus played in two further friendly defeats by Australia in September 2017, 2–1 and 3–2, when first choice goalkeeper Bárbara was injured.

Neuhaus retained her place in the national squad when Vadão returned to the head coach position and named his squad for the 2017 Yongchuan International Tournament in October.

== Personal life ==
Neuhaus studied physiotherapy at Universidade Santa Cecília (UNISANTA).

== Honours ==
=== Club ===
Benfica

- Campeonato Nacional Feminino: 2020–21
- Campeonato Nacional II Divisão Feminino: 2018–19
- Taça de Portugal: 2018–19
- Taça da Liga: 2019–20
- Supertaça de Portugal: 2019

PAOK

- Greek A Division (2): 2023–24, 2025–26
- Greek Cup (2): 2024, 2025–26

=== Individual ===
- PSAPP Best Goalkeeper (2): 2023–24, 2025–26
- PSAPP Best XI (2): 2023–24, 2025–26
