= Lenche Andreevska =

Macedonian football midfielder (born 1992)

Personal information
- Date of birth: 13 August 1992 (age 34)
- Place of birth: Republic of North Macedonia
- Height: 1.70 m (5 ft 7 in)
- Position: Attacking midfielder

Team information
- Current team: PAOK FC

Senior career*
Years	Team	Apps	(Gls)
2008–2009	Shkiponjat		
2009–2010	Tikvesanka		
2010–2011	Borec Veles		
2011–2012	Naše Taksi		
2012–2013	Ada Velipojë		
2015–2020	Skopje 2014		
2020–2023	Kamenica Sasa		
2023–2024	Horozkent	22	(18)
2024–2025	Ünye Kadın	24	(6)
2025–	PAOK	22	(9)

International career^{‡}
2007–2009	North Macedonia U17	9	(0)
2008–2010	North Macedonia U19	9	(0)
2011–	North Macedonia	27	(1)
- * Club domestic league appearances and goals as of 4 June 226 ‡ National team caps and goals as of 1 August 2025

Lenche Andreevska (Macedonian: Ленче Андреевска, born 13 August 1992) is a Macedonian women's football midfielder who plays for PAOK in the Greek A Division.

== Club career ==
Andreevska is 1.70 m (5 ft 7 in) tall, and plays .n the winger midfielder position.

She has played in the Champions League with Shkiponjat, Tikvesanka, Borec Veles and Naše Taksi.

She then played for Kamenica Sasa, and took part in the Champions League for her team.

In October 2023, she moved to Turkey, and signed with Denizli-based club Horozkeny S.K. to play in the second-tşer First League. She scored 18 goals in 22 matches played.

The next season, she transferred to the newly to the Turkish Super League promoted club Ünye Kadın in Ordu.

== International career ==
She is a member of the Macedonian national team. As a junior international she played the 2010 U-19 European Championship.

== International goals ==
No.	Date	Venue	Opponent	Score	Result	Competition
1.	4 June 2024	Zimbru Stadium, Chișinău, Moldova	Moldova	3–1	4–2	UEFA Women's Euro 2025 qualifying

== Honours ==
=== Club ===
Naše Taksi

- Macedonian Football Championship: 2011–12
- Macedonian Football Cup: 2011–12

Ada Velipojë

- Kategoria Superiore: 2012–13

Skopje 2014

- Macedonian Football Championship (3): 2015–16, 2017–18, 2018–19
- Macedonian Football Cup (2): 2015–16, 2018–19

Kamenica Sasa

- Macedonian Football Championship: 2020–21
- Macedonian Football Cup: 2021–22

PAOK

- Greek A Division: 2025–26
- Greek Cup: 2025–26

=== Individual ===
- PSAPP Best XI: 2025–26
