= Anastasia Gkatsou =

Greek footballer

Personal information
- Date of birth: 13 October 1997 (age 29)
- Position: Centre-back

Team information
- Current team: Asteras Tripolis F.C.
- Number: 5

Youth career
- 2006–2013: PAOK

Senior career*
Years	Team	Apps	(Gls)
2013–2021	PAOK		
2021–2022	Pink Bari		
2023–2024	REA	21	(5)
2024–2025	Panathinaikos	16	(1)
2025–	Asteras Tripolis	23	(6)

International career^{‡}
2016–	Greece	36	(1)
- * Club domestic league appearances and goals as of 29 May 2026 ‡ National team caps and goals as of 29 May 2026

Anastasia Gkatsou (Greek: Αναστασία Γκάτσου; born 13 October 1997) is a Greek footballer who plays as a defender for Asteras Tripolis and has appeared for the Greece women's national team.

== Career ==
Gkatsou has been capped for the Greece national team, appearing for the team during the 2019 FIFA Women's World Cup qualifying cycle.

== Honours ==
=== Clubs ===
PAOK

- Greek A Division (7): 2014–15, 2015–16, 2016–17, 2017–18, 2018–19, 2019–20, 2020–21
- Greek Cup (4): 2013–14, 2014–15, 2015–16, 2017

=== Individual ===
- PSAPP Best XI (2): 2023–24, 2025–26
