= Maria Paterna =

Greek footballer

Personal information
- Date of birth: 8 April 2000 (age 26)
- Position: Right-back

Team information
- Current team: Asteras Tripolis F.C.

Senior career*
Years	Team	Apps	(Gls)
2016–2021	PAOK		
2021–2022	Aris Limassol	16	(2)
2022	Afturelding	2	(0)
2022	Lakatamia	8	(1)
2023–2026	OFI	78	(7)
2026–	Asteras Tripolis		

International career^{‡}
2015–2017	Greece U17	12	(0)
2017–2019	Greece U19	9	(0)
2020–	Greece	35	(1)
- * Club domestic league appearances and goals as of 25 May 2026 ‡ National team caps and goals as of 20 April 2026

Maria Paterna (Greek: Μαρία Πατερνά; born 8 April 2000) is a Greek footballer who plays as a defender for A Division club Asteras Tripolis and the Greece women's national team.

== Club career ==
Paterna has played for PAOK in Greece at the UEFA Women's Champions League.

== International career ==
Paterna capped for Greece at senior level during the UEFA Women's Euro 2022 qualifying.

== Honours ==
=== Club ===
PAOK

- A Division (5): 2016/17, 2017/18, 2018/19, 2019/20, 2020/21
- Greek Cup (1): 2017

OFI

- A Division; runner-up: 2023/24

=== Individual ===
- PSAPP Best XI (2): 2023–24, 2025–26
