= Taiana Tolleson =

American soccer player (born 1998)

Personal information
- Full name: Taiana Ku’uipo Kamalalani Tolleson
- Date of birth: April 24, 1998 (age 28)
- Height: 6 ft 0 in (1.83 m)
- Position: Goalkeeper

Team information
- Current team: Agia Paraskevi
- Number: 1

Youth career
- Surf Soccer Hawaii

College career
Years	Team	Apps	(Gls)
2016–2019	Vanderbilt Commodores	34	(0)

Senior career*
Years	Team	Apps	(Gls)
2023–2024	Tennessee SC	21	(0)
2024–2025	Lexington SC	1	(0)
2025–	Agia Paraskevi	24	(0)
- * Club domestic league appearances and goals as of 4 June 2026

Taiana Ku’uipo Kamalalani Tolleson (born April 24, 1998) is an American professional soccer player who plays as a goalkeeper for Greek A Division club Agia Paraskevi. She played college soccer for the Vanderbilt Commodores before starting her professional career with USL Super League club Lexington SC.

== Early life ==
Tolleson is from Kailua-Kona, Hawaii. She began playing soccer at the age of 4 and eventually started competing as a goalkeeper at Konawaena High School. While playing in a state tournament playoff match, she was recruited to local club Surf Soccer Hawaii by coach Shawn Kuroda. Tolleson accepted the offer and also played for Surf Soccer throughout high school.

== College career ==
During high school, Tolleson was recruited by the Vanderbilt Commodores. Although she initially struggled to meet the program's academic standards, she was eventually able to join Vanderbilt and become the first Big Island goalkeeper to sign with an NCAA Division I school. Tolleson's presence on the team also made her the first Hawaiian soccer player in Vanderbilt's program history.

Upon moving to Tennessee, Tolleson faced competition on the squad and did not make any appearances as a freshman. However, over the next two seasons, she split playing time with original starter Lauren Demarchi. Tolleson, with 6 second-year appearances, got the lion's share of minutes in her sophomore season. The following year, the two teammates ended up with a more equal split of playing time and both recorded 5 shutouts. In her senior year, Tolleson appeared in all 21 of the Commodores' games, often coming in as a substitute to close out matches. Despite being direct competitors, Tolleson and Demarchi managed to cultivate a friendship throughout their four seasons of soccer and have credited each other in their growth as goalkeepers. Tolleson ended her college career with 34 appearances under her belt, including 2 in the NCAA tournament. She also made the SEC Academic Honor Roll in all four years.

== Club career ==
=== Tennessee SC ===
After graduating, Tolleson spent several years away from soccer. In 2023, she returned to the sport and ended up playing two consecutive seasons for Tennessee SC of the pre-professional USL W League. She became Tennessee SC's starter in her first season and was named to the league's Team of the Month for June 2023. In both campaigns, Tolleson contributed to South Central Division championship victories.

=== Lexington SC ===
On July 5, 2024, Tolleson signed her first professional contract with Lexington SC ahead of the inaugural USL Super League season. In doing so, she became the first Big Island native to ink a deal with a professional club in the United States. She made her professional debut on May 29, 2025, starting and playing 90 minutes in Lexington's final match of the season. Tolleson did not return to Lexington after her first season with the club.

=== Agia Paraskevi ===
Tolleson signed with Greek club Agia Paraskevi on July 11, 2025. In her first season, she started in every match for the club, keeping 10 clean sheets in 29 total appearances.

== Career statistics ==
=== College ===
Team	Season	NCAA Regular Season			SEC Tournament		NCAA Tournament		Total	
Team	Season	Division	Apps	Goals	Apps	Goals	Apps	Goals	Apps	Goals
Vanderbilt Commodores	2017	Div. I	5	0	0	0	0	0	5	0
Vanderbilt Commodores	2018	Div. I	9	0	0	0	0	0	9	0
Vanderbilt Commodores	2019	Div. I	18	0	1	0	1	0	20	0
Vanderbilt Commodores	Total		32	0	1	0	1	0	34	0

=== Club ===
As of 4 June 2026

Appearances and goals by club, season and competition
Club	Season	League			Cup		Continental		Total	
Club	Season	Division	Apps	Goals	Apps	Goals	Apps	Goals	Apps	Goals
Tennessee SC	2023	USL W League	13	0	—		—		13	0
Tennessee SC	2024	USL W League	8	0	—		—		8	0
Tennessee SC	Total		21	0	—		—		21	0
Lexington SC	2024–25	USL Super League	1	0	0	0	—		1	0
Agia Paraskevi	2025–26	Greek A Division	24	0	5	0	—		29	0
Career total			46	0	5	0	—		51	0
