= Joanna Olszewska =

Polish footballer (born 1999)

Personal information
- Full name: Joanna Teresa Olszewska
- Date of birth: 26 April 1999 (age 27)
- Height: 1.70 m (5 ft 7 in)
- Position: Centre back

Team information
- Current team: Asteras Tripolis

Senior career*
Years	Team	Apps	(Gls)
2012–2018	AZS Wrocław		
2018–2024	GKS Katowice	91	(7)
2024–2025	Panathinaikos	19	(0)
2025–2026	Mura	7	(0)
2026	OFI	11	(1)
2026–	Asteras Tripolis	0	(0)

International career
2015	Poland U17	2	(0)
2016–2018	Poland U19	11	(2)
2023	Poland U23	1	(0)
2019	Poland	5	(0)
- * Club domestic league appearances and goals as of 10 August 2026

Joanna Teresa Olszewska (born 26 April 1999) is a Polish professional footballer who plays as a centre back for Greek A Division club Asteras Tripolis.

== Career statistics ==
=== International ===
Appearances and goals by national team and year
National team	Year	Apps	Goals
Poland	2019	5	0
Total		5	0

== Honours ==
GKS Katowice

- Ekstraliga: 2022–23
- Polish Cup: 2023–24
