= Samantha Akinyi =

Kenyan footballer (born 1995)

Personal information
- Full name: Samantha Akinyi Okeya
- Date of birth: 6 January 1995 (age 31)
- Place of birth: Nairobi, Kenya
- Height: 1.84 m (6 ft 0 in)
- Position: Goalkeeper

Team information
- Current team: Makolanders

Youth career
- 2003–2012: Babadogo United

Senior career*
Years	Team	Apps	(Gls)
2012–2014	Matuu FC (National Youth Talent Academy)		
2016–2018	Spedag		
2018–2019	Vihiga Queens		
2020–	Makolanders		

International career
2012–	Kenya		
- * Club domestic league appearances and goals

Samantha Akinyi Okeya (born 6 January 1995) is a Kenyan professional footballer who plays as a goalkeeper for Makolander Ladies FC and the Kenya women's national team.

== Club career ==
Samantha Akinyi joined the Mathare Youths Sports Association (MYSA) in 2002, where she was playing for Ruaraka zone Babadogo United Ladies.

In December 2011 she transferred to National Youth Talent Academy, which later joined the Kenya Women's League as Matuu Girls and emerge the title holders that season, later in the long run she joined Kenya Methodist University majorly known as KEMU QUEENS the 2015 League winners, she also spend some time with Spedag Fc that was so far dominating the league then. In 2018 She joined the reigning champions Vihiga Queens in the Kenya

Women Premier League. where she helped the team win the league 2018–2019, emerging the best goal keeper for the team that year

She is currently featuring for Makolander LFC .

Harambee Starlets player Samantha Akinyi begun her coaching journey on Friday, November 11, 2021, after being duly certified after attending a CAF D coaching course in Baba Dogo.

== International career ==
She was the starting goalkeeper for Kenya in a 2016 Africa Women Cup of Nations qualification match against Equatorial Guinea. She represented Kenya at the 2016 Africa Women Cup of Nations, and was the goalkeeper in the match against Ghana.

== See also ==
- List of Kenya women's international footballers
