= Grigoria Pouliou =

Greek footballer

Personal information
- Date of birth: 23 October 2000 (age 26)
- Height: 1.71 m (5 ft 7 in)
- Position: Striker

Team information
- Current team: Panathinaikos
- Number: 9

Senior career*
Years	Team	Apps	(Gls)
2014–2018	Mesologgi 2008		
2018–2021	PAOK	44	(39)
2021–2022	Aris Limassol	18	(10)
2022–2024	Medyk Konin	41	(5)
2024–	Panathinaikos	37	(20)

International career^{‡}
2015–2017	Greece U17	12	(0)
2017–2019	Greece U19	9	(2)
2019–	Greece	33	(4)
- * Club domestic league appearances and goals as of 20 September 2026 ‡ National team caps and goals as of 28 May 2026

Grigoria Pouliou (Greek: Γρηγορία Πουλίου; born 23 October 2000) is a Greek footballer who plays as a forward for Greek A Division club Panathinaikos and the Greece women's national team.

== Club career ==
Pouliou has played for PAOK in Greece at the UEFA Women's Champions League.

== International career ==
Pouliou capped for Greece at senior level during the UEFA Women's Euro 2022 qualifying.

== International goals ==
No.	Date	Venue	Opponent	Score	Result	Competition
1.	22 October 2021	Astana Arena, Astana, Kazakhstan	Kazakhstan	1–0	1–0	2023 FIFA Women's World Cup qualification
2.	12 April 2022	Pampeloponnisiako Stadium, Patras, Greece	Estonia	3–0	3–0	2023 FIFA Women's World Cup qualification
3.	11 November 2022	Georgios Kamaras Stadium, Athens, Greece	Cyprus	4–0	4–0	Friendly
4.	29 November 2025	BH FF Training Center, Zenica, Bosnia and Herzegovina	Belarus	1–0	2–0	Friendly

== Honours ==
=== Club ===
Mesologgi 2008

- Greek B Division (1): 2016–17

PAOK

- Greek A Division (3): 2018–19, 2019–20, 2020–21

=== Individual ===
- PSAPP Best Greek Player: 2025–26
- PSAPP Best XI: 2025–26
