= Minela Gačanica =

Bosnia and Herzegovina footballer

Personal information
- Date of birth: 9 March 2000 (age 26)
- Place of birth: Mostar, Bosnia and Herzegovina
- Height: 1.75 m (5 ft 9 in)
- Position: Forward

Team information
- Current team: PAOK
- Number: 11

Senior career*
Years	Team	Apps	(Gls)
2014–2021	Emina Mostar		
2021–2022	Breznica	20	(43)
2022–2024	SFK 2000	37	(58)
2024–2025	Beşiktaş J.K.	16	(4)
2025–	PAOK	24	(23)

International career^{‡}
2015–2017	Bosnia and Herzegovina U17	9	(2)
2017–2018	Bosnia and Herzegovina U19	6	(1)
2019–	Bosnia and Herzegovina	33	(3)
- * Club domestic league appearances and goals as of 4 June 2026 ‡ National team caps and goals as of 17 August 2025

Minela Gačanica (born 9 March 2000) is a Bosnia and Herzegovina footballer who plays as a forward for Greek A Division club PAOK and the Bosnia and Herzegovina women's national team.

== International goals ==
No.	Date	Venue	Opponent	Score	Result	Competition
1.	6 September 2022	Dalga Arena, Baku, Azerbaijan	Azerbaijan	1–0	1–1	2023 FIFA Women's World Cup qualification
2.	5 December 2023	Bilino Polje Stadium, Zenica, Bosnia and Herzegovina	Belarus	1–0	1–0	2023–24 UEFA Women's Nations League
3.	21 February 2025	Bosnia and Herzegovina FA Training Centre, Zenica, Bosnia and Herzegovina	Romania	3–0	4–0	2025 UEFA Women's Nations League
4.	7 March 2026	Bosnia and Herzegovina FA Training Centre, Zenica, Bosnia and Herzegovina	Liechtenstein	11–1	13–1	2027 FIFA Women's World Cup qualification

== Honours ==
=== Club ===
Breznica

- 1. ŽFL (1): 2021–22

SFK 2000

- Bosnia and Herzegovina Premier League (2): 2022–23, 2023–24
- Bosnia and Herzegovina Football Cup (2): 2022–23, 2023–24

PAOK

- Greek A Division (1): 2025–26
- Greek Cup (1): 2025–26

=== Individual ===
- PSAPP Best Foreign Player: 2025–26
- PSAPP Best XI: 2025–26
