= Shania van Nuland =

Dutch association football player

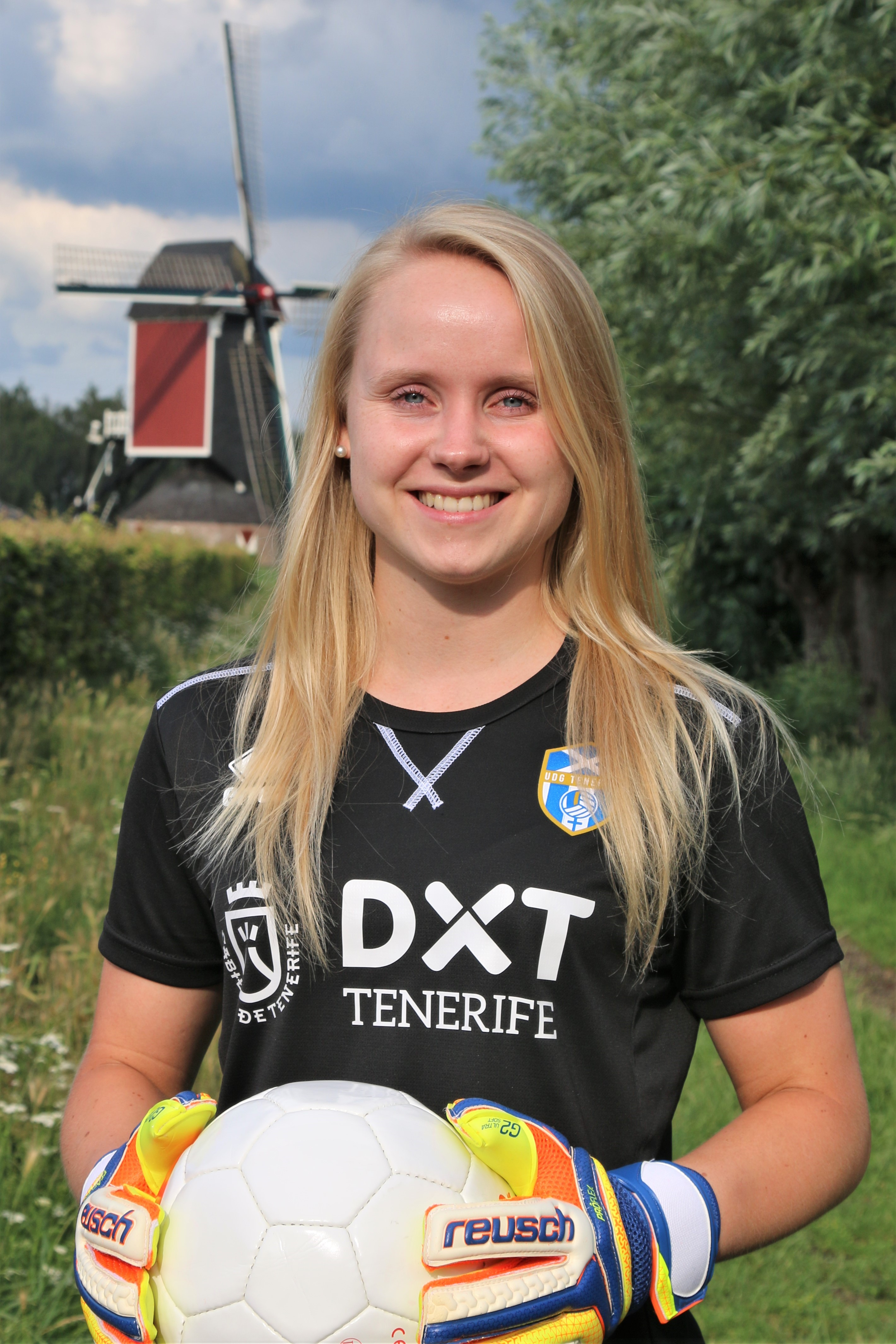

Personal information
- Full name: Shania Petronella Johanna Maria van Nuland
- Date of birth: 13 April 1997 (age 29)
- Place of birth: 's-Hertogenbosch, Netherlands
- Position: Goalkeeper

Team information
- Current team: Gil Vicente
- Number: 1

Youth career
- 2002–2010: EVVC Vinkel
- 2010–2012: SteDoCo

College career
Years	Team	Apps	(Gls)
2015–2018	Niagara Purple Eagles	33	(0)
2018–2019	Florida Gulf Coast Eagles		

Senior career*
Years	Team	Apps	(Gls)
2012–2013	RKSV Prinses Irene		
2013–2015	Buitenveldert		
2019	Heerenveen	0	(0)
2020	Tacuense		
2020–2021	Tenerife B	3	(0)
2022–2023	La Solana	1	(0)
2023	Real Betis B	9	(0)
2023–2024	Elche	8	(0)
2024	Servette	1	(0)
2024–2026	OFI	28	(0)
2026–	Gil Vicente	9	(0)

International career
2013	Netherlands U16	1	(0)
- * Club domestic league appearances and goals as of 18 May 2026

Shania Petronella Johanna Maria van Nuland (born 13 April 1997) is a Dutch footballer who plays as a goalkeeper for Portuguese club Gil Vicente F.C. in the Campeonato Nacional II. She has previously played in Spain, Switzerland and Greece.

== International career ==
Shania van Nuland has represented the Netherlands at youth level.

== Honours ==
Servette

- Swiss Women's Super League (1): 2023–24
