= Amazones Dramas =

- Full name: Amazones Dramas AS
- Nickname: Amazones
- Founded: 2005
- Dissolved: 2018
- Ground: Gipedo Kokkinogeia Dramas
- Capacity: 1,000

Amazones Dramas A.S. (Greek: Α.Σ. Αμαζόνες Δράμας) is a Greek women's football club from the city of Drama. It plays in Greek's highest national football league, the Greek A Division known as Alpha Ethniki. The team won the championship in 2013–14, ending an eight-year title run by PAOK. However, in 2018, it withdrew from the league due to financial problems.

== History ==
The club was founded in September 2005. In 2010/11 the team played its first season in the top division finishing 10th out of 13.

== Honours ==
- Greek A Division champions: 2014
- Greek Women's Cup runners-up: 2014, 2016
