= 2020–21 Greek A Division (women's football) =

32nd season of top women's football (soccer) league in Greece

Greek A Division
- Season: 2020–21
- Dates: 11 April – 13 June 2021
- Champions: PAOK (16th title)
- Relegated: Agrotikos Asteras Agias Varvaras; Vasilissa Thrakis; Atromitos; Karyatides Spartis
- Women's Champions League: PAOK
- Matches: 112
- Goals: 403 (3.6 per match)
- Top goalscorer: Anastasia Spyridonidou (22 goals)
- Biggest home win: PAOK 15–0 Agrotikos Asteras Agias Varvaras
- Biggest away win: Vasilissa Thrakis 0–10 PAOK
- Highest scoring: PAOK 15–0 Agrotikos Asteras Agias Varvaras
- Longest winning run: 11 games PAOK
- Longest unbeaten run: 11 games PAOK
- Longest winless run: 10 games Vasilissa Thrakis; Karyatides Spartis
- Longest losing run: 10 games Vasilissa Thrakis; Karyatides Spartis
- All statistics correct as of 28 December 2025.

The 2020–21 Greek A Division season was the 32nd season of the top–level women's football league in Greece. PAOK were the defending champions.

The competition was originally scheduled to begin on 1 November 1, 2020 but was postponed due to the COVID-19 pandemic. On 5 April 2021, the executive committee of the HFF decided that the league would officially begin on 11 April.

The 22 participating teams were divided into two groups based on geographical criteria. During the first phase, the teams competed in a single round of matches. After the completion of the group stage, single classification matches would be held at a neutral venue between the group winners to determine the champion, as well as between the runners-up to decide third place.

PAOK won their seventh consecutive title and their sixteenth overall.

== Teams Changes ==
Promoted from 2019 to 2020 Greek B Division	Relegated from 2019–20 Greek A Division
Kastoria; Karyatides Spartis; Ergotelis; Agia Paraskevi	None

== North group ==
=== Teams, stadiums and locations ===
Locations of the 2020–21 season clubs

Team	City	Stadium	Capacity
AEL	Larissa	AEL FC Arena	17,118
Agrotikos Asteras Agias Varvaras	Agia Varvara, Imathia	Agia Varvara Stadium	
Agrotikos Asteras	Evosmos	Agrotikos Asteras Stadium	2,267
Aris Thessaloniki	Thessaloniki	Agios Vasileios Stadium	
Doxa 2016	Drama	Adriani Stadium	1,000
Elpides Karditsas	Karditsa	Municipal Stadium of Karditsa	6,000
Giannena	Evosmos	Epirus Sport Stadium	
Kastoria	Kastoria	Municipal Stadium of Kastoria	8,000
PAOK	Thessaloniki	PAOK FC Sport Center	
Trikala 2011	Trikala	Trikala Municipal Stadium	15,000
Vasilissa Thrakis	Xanthi	Thalassia Municipal Stadium	

=== Personnel and sponsorship ===
Team	Head coach	Captain	Kit manufacturer	Main shirt sponsor
AEL	(Greece) Vasilis Mitakos	(Greece) Dimitra Riga	Macron	None
Agrotikos Asteras Agias Varvaras	(Greece) Giorgos Koulakiotis	(Greece) Agni Kioutachiali	Givova	Aretakis Cucine
Agrotikos Asteras	(Greece) Glykeria Gkatzogianni	(Greece) Maria Kaltsidi	Joma	Auto Control KTEO
Aris Thessaloniki	(Greece) Ilias Salamanis	(Greece) Christina Kokoviadou	Adidas	None
Doxa 2016	(Greece) Ntinos Tegxizoglou	(Greece) Stela Kotsaki	Zeus	Estate Manolesakis
Elpides Karditsas	(Greece) Dimitris Koutsonasios	(Greece) Georgia Simou	Zeus	None
Giannena	(Greece) Anestis Zois	(Greece) Glykeria Nikopoulou	Givova	Kausima Mparatsas
Kastoria	(Greece) Christos Kalyvas	(Greece) Argyro Lioulia	VSR	H Papia Pizza & Barfood
PAOK	(Serbia) Perica Krstic	(Greece) Thomai Vardali	Macron	None
Trikala 2011	(Greece) Giorgos Loules	(Greece) Vaso Tziora	Legea	To Tsagali
Vasilissa Thrakis	(Greece) Anestis Alexoudis	(Greece) Evangelia Katsarou	Erima	None

=== League table ===
Pos	Team	Pld	W	D	L	GF	GA	GD	Pts	Qualification or relegation
1	PAOK	10	10	0	0	69	2	+67	30	Classification matches
2	AEL	10	7	1	2	37	6	+31	22	Classification matches
3	Aris Thessaloniki	10	7	1	2	21	10	+11	22	
4	Agrotikos Asteras	10	7	1	2	28	8	+20	22	
5	Trikala 2011	10	5	1	4	25	22	+3	16	
6	Doxa 2016	10	5	1	4	13	12	+1	16	
7	Giannena	10	4	0	6	6	19	−13	12	
8	Elpides Karditsas	10	3	2	5	14	23	−9	11	
9	Kastoria	10	2	0	8	11	42	−31	6	
10	Agrotikos Asteras Agias Varvaras (R)	10	1	1	8	9	45	−36	4	Relegation to Greek B Division
11	Vasilissa Thrakis (R)	10	0	0	10	2	46	−44	0	Relegation to Greek B Division

Source: EPO
Rules for classification: 1) Points; 2) Head-to-head points; 3) Goal difference; 4) Number of goals scored; 5) Head-to-head goal difference; 6) Head-to-head away goals scored
(R) Relegated

=== Results ===
Home \ Away	AEL	AAV	AAE	ARI	DOX	ELP	GIA	KAS	PAO	TRI	VAS
AEL	—	10–0		1–0		3–0		6–2			9–0
Agrotikos Asteras Agias Varvaras		—				3–3	0–1	1–3		0–2	
Agrotikos Asteras	0–0	6–1	—			4–0			0–3	3–1	
Aris Thessaloniki		4–1	2–1	—	1–1		2–0	2–0	0–3		
Doxa 2016	2–0	1–0	0–1		—	2–1			0–3		2–0
Elpides Karditsas				1–2		—	2–1		0–5	2–2	2–1
Giannena	0–3		0–2		2–0		—	1–0			
Kastoria			1–6		1–4	0–3		—		0–4	4–1
PAOK	2–0	15–0					6–0	14–0	—	8–2	
Trikala 2011	0–5			2–3	3–1		4–0			—	5–0
Vasilissa Thrakis		0–3	0–5	0–5			0–1		0–10		—

Source: EPO
Legend: Blue = home team win; Yellow = draw; Red = away team win.

== South group ==
=== Teams, stadiums and locations ===
Locations of the 2020–21 season clubs

Team	City	Stadium	Capacity
AEK Messolonghiou	Messolonghi	Messolonghi Municipal Stadium	3,500
Agia Paraskevi	Agia Paraskevi	Agia Paraskevi Stadium	2,800
Asteras Rethymnou	Rethymno	Sohora Municipal Stadium	1,300
Atromitos	Peristeri	Agios Ierotheos Stadium	
Avantes Chalkidas	Chalkida	Enosiako Gipedo Evias	
Ergotelis	Heraklion	Nikos Kazantzakis Stadium	1,000
Feidon Argous	Argos	Kiveri Stadium	100
Karyatides Spartis	Sparti	Sparti Municipal Stadium	1,500
Odysseas Glyfadas	Glyfada	Charis Pavlidis Stadium	500
OFI Crete	Heraklion	Almyros Stadium	2,000
Olympiada Ymittou	Ymittos	Ymittos Municipal Stadium	1,000

=== Personnel and sponsorship ===
Team	Head coach	Captain	Kit manufacturer	Main shirt sponsor
AEK Messolonghiou	(Greece) Giannis Goulis	(Greece) Maria Gromitsari	Givova	Nea Odos
Agia Paraskevi	(Greece) Giannis Charalampidis	(Greece) Despoina Vitoula	Legea	None
Asteras Rethymnou	(Greece) Giorgos Ioannidis	(Greece) Eleftheria Dafermou	Macron	None
Atromitos	(Greece) Vasilis Spertos	(Greece) Xanthi Misirli	Hummel	ETEKA
Avantes Chalkidas	(Serbia) Dragan Knežević	(Greece) Faidra Logou	Legea	J.S. Construction
Ergotelis	(Greece) Gianna Douka	(Greece) Efrosini Xera	Capelli	None
Feidon Argous	(Greece) Dimitris Totsikas	(Greece) Eirini Karagianni	Legea	None
Karyatides Spartis	None			
Odysseas Glyfadas	(Greece) Georgios Vaitsis	(Greece) Maria Papakosta	Nike	Ten Brinke
OFI Crete	(Greece) Stamatis Mamatzakis	(Greece) Vasso Kydonaki	Puma	None
Olympiada Ymittou	(Greece) Nikos Gkalitsios	(Greece) Mariniki Michalopoulou	Playsports	Syghroni Metaforiki

=== League table ===
Pos	Team	Pld	W	D	L	GF	GA	GD	Pts	Qualification or relegation
1	Avantes Chalkidas	10	8	1	1	20	8	+12	25	Classification matches
2	Agia Paraskevi	10	6	4	0	16	1	+15	22	Classification matches
3	Odysseas Glyfadas	10	6	3	1	26	5	+21	21	
4	Olympiada Ymittou	10	6	3	1	22	6	+16	21	
5	AEK Messolonghiou	10	4	2	4	20	17	+3	14	
6	Ergotelis	10	3	4	3	17	9	+8	13	
7	OFI	10	3	4	3	11	12	−1	13	
8	Asteras Rethymnou	10	3	2	5	14	21	−7	11	
9	Feidon Argous	10	3	0	7	12	21	−9	9	
10	Atromitos (R)	10	1	1	8	6	34	−28	4	Relegation to Greek B Division
11	Karyatides Spartis (Note: Karyatides Spartis withdrew from the competition due to financial problems.) (R)	10	0	0	10	0	30	−30	0	Club withdrew from the league

Source: EPO
Rules for classification: 1) Points; 2) Head-to-head points; 3) Goal difference; 4) Number of goals scored; 5) Head-to-head goal difference; 6) Head-to-head away goals scored
(R) Relegated

=== Results ===
Home \ Away	AEK	AGI	AST	ATR	AVA	ERG	FEI	KAR	ODY	OFI	OLY
AEK Messolonghiou	—					2–6	4–1		2–4		0–1
Agia Paraskevi	2–0	—	5–0		1–0		1–0		1–1		
Asteras Rethymnou	1–1		—	1–0	0–1					1–2	2–7
Atromitos	0–5	0–3		—		0–4	0–3			1–1	
Avantes Chalkidas	1–1			6–2	—			3–0^{[a]}	2–1	2–1	1–0
Ergotelis		0–0	1–1		0–1	—		3–0^{[a]}			2–3
Feidon Argous			0–5		2–3	2–1	—			1–2	0–2
Karyatides Spartis	0–3^{[a]}	0–3^{[a]}	0–3^{[a]}	0–3^{[a]}			0–3^{[a]}	—		0–3^{[a]}	
Odysseas Glyfadas			4–0	6–0		0–0	3–0	3–0^{[a]}	—		
OFI	1–2	0–0				0–0			0–4	—	1–1
Olympiada Ymittou		0–0		5–0				3–0^{[a]}	0–0		—

Source: EPO
Legend: Blue = home team win; Yellow = draw; Red = away team win.

^{a} Karyatides Spartis withdrew from the league and their remaining matches were awarded to the opposing team.

== Classification matches ==
The finals took place on 13 June 2021 at the Panthessaliko Stadium in Volos.

=== Third-place match ===
17:00 EEST

Agia Paraskevi	0–2	AEL
	Report	Rybanská 31'; Nafula 71'

Referee: Georgios Aslanidis (Pieria)

=== Final ===
20:30 EEST

Avantes Chalkidas	0–2	PAOK
	Report	Mitkou 8'; Spyridonidou 87'

Referee: Andromachi Tsiofliki (Larissa)

=== Final Classification ===
Position	Team	Qualification
1st place, gold medalist(s)	PAOK	Qualification for the Champions League qualifying round
2nd place, silver medalist(s)	Avantes Chalkidas	
3rd place, bronze medalist(s)	AEL	
4	Agia Paraskevi	

== Season statistics ==
As of 14 June 2021

=== Top Goalscorers ===
Rank	Player	Club	Goals
1	(Greece) Anastasia Spyridonidou	PAOK	22
2	(Greece) Grigoria Pouliou	PAOK	14
3	(Slovakia) Nikola Rybanská	AEL	12
3	(Kenya) Christine Nafula	AEL	12
4	(Greece) Maria Kapnisi	Odysseas Glyfadas	8
4	(Greece) Eleni Kakambouki	PAOK	8
5	(Greece) Vasiliki Petraki	Agia Paraskevi	6
5	(Greece) Magdalini Tsoukala	Agrotikos Asteras	6
5	(Greece) Christina Kokoviadou	Aris	6
5	(Greece) Stela Kotsaki	Doxa 2016	6
5	(France) Amon Scheers	Elpides Karditsas	6
5	(Greece) Maria Mitkou	PAOK	6
5	(Serbia) Ivana Zdravkovic	Trikala 2011	6
5	(Greece) Konstantina Kostopoulou	Trikala 2011	6
