= Elpides Karditsas =

Elpides Karditsas Ελπίδες Καρδίτσας
- Full name: Elpides Karditsas Football Club
- Founded: 1994
- Ground: Gipedo Kallifono
- Capacity: 1,000
- Manager: Dimitrios Drosos
- League: Greek B Division
- 2025–26: Greek Β Division, 10th (Gr:I)
Home colours

Elpides Karditsas is a Greek women's football club from the city of Karditsa. It was founded in 1994 and currently competes in the Greek A Division known as Alpha Ethniki. The team finished in second position, behind their main rivals PAOK, in two consecutive seasons – 2011–12 and 2012–13. In 2013–14 they again finished second.
