= PAOK FC (women) =

FC PAOK
- Full name: (Greek: Πανθεσσαλονίκειος Αθλητικός Όμιλος Κωνσταντινοπολιτών) (Pan-Thessalonikian Athletic Club of Constantinopolitans)
- Nickname: Dikefalos tou Vorra (Doublehead Eagle of the North)
- Founded: 2001
- Ground: Toumba Stadium
- Capacity: 28,703
- Chairman: Thanasis Katsaris
- Manager: Thanasis Patrikidis
- League: Greek A Division
- 2025–26: Greek A Division, Champions
- Website: paok.gr
Home colours	Away colours

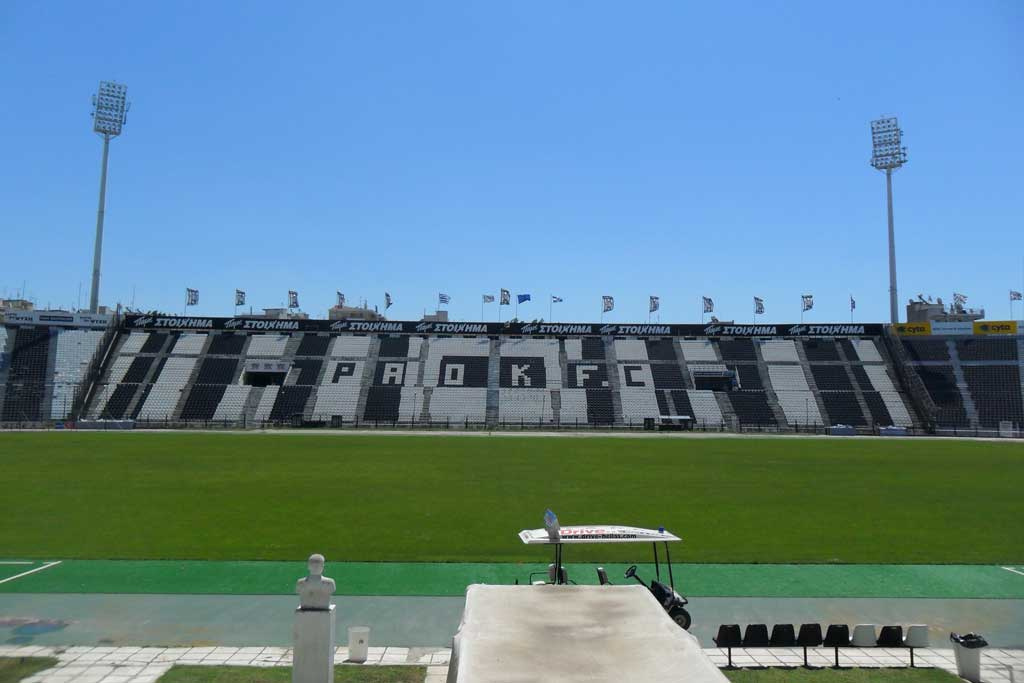
Toumba Stadium

Football Club P.A.O.K. Thessaloniki Women's Football or with its official name FC PAOK Thessaloniki, represents the major Greek multi-sports club AC PAOK in the national A Division and international women's football competitions.

It was founded in 2001 as PAOK took over Olympiada'96 Thessaloniki, which faced economic problems. It is currently the leading women's football team in Greece, having represented the country in the UEFA Women's Champions League for the last seven years.

== Current squad ==
As of 8 November 2026

Note: Flags indicate national team as defined under FIFA eligibility rules; some limited exceptions apply. Players may hold more than one non-FIFA nationality.

No.	Pos.	Nation	Player
1	GK	BRA	Dani Neuhaus
3	DF	GRE	Maria Gkizari
4	DF	GRE	Evmorfia Kiourexidou
5	DF	GRE	Maria Gkouni
6	DF	WAL	Grace Morris
7	FW	CYP	Eirini Michail
8	MF	ESP	Marta Llopis
10	MF	GRE	Thomai Vardali (captain)
11	MF	GRE	Nikoleta Kalesi
12	DF	GRE	Anna Veliani
13	GK	GRE	Chrysa Grigoriadou
14	FW	GRE	Vasiliki Giannaka
17	MF	GRE	Maria Mitkou (vice-captain)

No.	Pos.	Nation	Player
18	MF	GRE	Efi Brame
19	FW	GRE	Foteini Mpouronikou
22	MF	GRE	Panagiota Argyriou
23	MF	GRE	Eleftheria Drakogiannaki
24	FW	BIH	Minela Gačanica
25	DF	GRE	Elisavet Schortsianiti
27	DF	GRE	Markella Koskeridou
33	MF	GRE	Chrysanthi Voila
70	MF	MKD	Lenche Andreevska
77	MF	GRE	Ioli Stavropoulou
96	DF	GRE	Niki Malamousi
—	GK	GRE	Maria Tsakiri
—	DF	GRE	Konstantina Drakogiannaki
—	GK	GRE	Eva Konstantinidou

=== Out on loan ===
Note: Flags indicate national team as defined under FIFA eligibility rules; some limited exceptions apply. Players may hold more than one non-FIFA nationality.

No.	Pos.	Nation	Player
—	DF	GRE	Afroditi Stefani (at Volos until 30 June 2027)

== PAOK B (Youth Infrastructure Team) ==
- 'Panhellenic Junior Infrastructure Championship U-17
- Championship (2): 2023, 2024
- Infrastructure Championship U-12 Macedonia FCA Championship
- Championship (1): 2024
- 1st place in K12 in Macedonian Christmas Football Tournament with 7 games 2021.
- 1st place in a tournament in Kastoria for the B team of PAOK 2017.
- 1st place in 2022 "Scoring for Equality" tournament.
- 1st place in Junior Macedonia FCA Championship U-16 2022.
- 1st Lamia Tournament: 2024

== Notable players ==
- (United States) Kori Butterfield
- (Serbia) Jelena Dimitrijevic
- (Colombia) Gisela Arrieta
- (Latvia) (United States) Anna Kristīne Gornela
- (Greece) Ioanna Chamalidou
- (Greece) Natalia Chatzigiannidou
- (Cyprus) Eleni Giannou
- (Greece) Anastasia Gkatsou
- (Greece) Glykeria Gkatzogianni
- (Greece) Eleni Kakambouki
- (Greece) Dimitra Karapetsa
- (Greece) Kyriaki Kynossidou
- (Greece) Eirini Nefrou
- (Greece) Dimitra Panteliadou
- (Greece) Anthi Papakonstantinou
- (Greece) Maria Paterna
- (Greece) Nikoleta Pitsiou
- (Greece) Grigoria Pouliou
- (Greece) Anastasia Spyridonidou
- (Greece) Thenia Zerva
- (India) Manisha Kalyan

== Honours ==
- A Division (20) (record): 2001–02, 2005–06, 2006–07, 2007–08, 2008–09, 2009–10, 2010–11, 2011–12, 2012–13, 2014–15, 2015–16, 2016–17, 2017–18, 2018–19, 2019–20, 2020–21, 2021–22, 2022–23, 2023–24, 2025–26
- Greek Women's Cup (8) (record): 2002, 2013, 2014, 2015, 2016, 2017, 2024, 2026
- Double (7) (record): 2002, 2013, 2015, 2016, 2017, 2023, 2026

== Season to season ==
Season	League									Cup	UWCL	Top scorer	
Season	Div	Pos	Pld	W	D	L	GF	GA	Pts	Cup	UWCL	Name(s)	Goal
2001–02	A	1st	17	15	1	1			46	Champion	—		
2002–03	A	2nd	22				78	17	50		Second qualifying round	(Greece) Dimitra Panteliadou	23
2003–04	A	3rd/4th	12								—		
2004–05	A	2nd	16	8	5	3	54	15	29		—		
2005–06	A	1st	13						35		—		
2006–07	A	1st									First qualifying round		
2007–08	A	1st	16	13	2	1	53	9	41		First qualifying round		
2008–09	A	1st	16	14	2	0	66	3	44		First qualifying round		
2009–10	A	1st	22	18	4	0	73	15	58		Round of 32		
2010–11	A	1st	24	24	0	0	101	9	72		Round of 32		
2011–12	A	1st	18	15	2	1	77	13	47		Qualifying round	(Greece) Dimitra Panteliadou	20
2012–13	A	1st	18	16	1	1	80	11	49	Champion	Qualifying round		
2013–14	A	3rd	18	12	3	3	74	21	39	Champion	Qualifying round		
2014–15	A	1st	18	15	3	0	78	6	48	Champion	—		
2015–16	A	1st	18	17	1	0	70	6	52	Champion	Round of 32	(Greece) Dimitra Panteliadou	20
2016–17	A	1st	16	16	0	0	79	7	48	Champion	Qualifying round	(Greece) Eleni Markou	18
2017–18	A	1st	22	18	2	2	90	10	56		Round of 32	(Greece) Eleni Markou	27
2018–19	A	1st	20	20	0	0	106	5	60		—	(Colombia) Gisela Betancourt	30
2019–20	A	1st	14	14	0	0	75	1	42		Qualifying round	(Colombia) Gisela Betancourt	25
2020–21	A	1st	11	11	0	0	71	2	33		First qualifying round	(Greece) Anastasia Spyridonidou	22
2021–22	A	1st	20	19	1	0	79	3	58		Round 1	(Kenya) Esse Akida	17
2022–23	A	1st	20	19	0	1	70	8	57		Round 1	(Greece) Thomai Vardali	16
2023–24	A	1st	26	24	2	0	78	8	74	Champion	Round 1	(Sweden) Emelie Helmvall	23
2024–25	A	5th	22	12	7	3	44	13	43	Semifinals	Round 1	(Greece) Thomai Vardali (India) Manisha Kalyan	7
2025–26	A	1st	26	23	3	0	89	4	72	Champion	—	(Bosnia and Herzegovina) Minela Gačanica	23

== UEFA competitions record ==
Season	Competition	Round	Club	Home	Away	Aggregate	Qual.
2002–03	UEFA Women's Cup	Second Qualifying Round	(Romania) Regal București	0–3		4th place	
2002–03	UEFA Women's Cup	Second Qualifying Round	(Norway) Trondheims-Ørn	0–12		4th place	
2002–03	UEFA Women's Cup	Second Qualifying Round	(Netherlands) SV Saestum	1–8		4th place	
2006–07	UEFA Women's Cup	First Qualifying Round	(Israel) Maccabi Holon	1–1		3rd place	
2006–07	UEFA Women's Cup	First Qualifying Round	(Ukraine) Lehenda Chernihiv	0–5		3rd place	
2006–07	UEFA Women's Cup	First Qualifying Round	(Cyprus) AEK Kokkinochovion	5–2		3rd place	
2007–08	UEFA Women's Cup	First Qualifying Round	(Belarus) Universitet Vitebsk	0–4		3rd place	
2007–08	UEFA Women's Cup	First Qualifying Round	(Bulgaria) FC NSA Sofia	2–2		3rd place	
2007–08	UEFA Women's Cup	First Qualifying Round	(Estonia) Pärnu JK	3–2		3rd place	
2008–09	UEFA Women's Cup	First Qualifying Round	(Estonia) Levadia Tallinn	3–0		3rd place	
2008–09	UEFA Women's Cup	First Qualifying Round	(Ukraine) Naftokhimik Kalush	0–1		3rd place	
2008–09	UEFA Women's Cup	First Qualifying Round	(Poland) AZS Wroclaw	0–4		3rd place	
2009–10	Champions League	Round of 32	(England) Arsenal	0–9	0–9	0–18	
2010–11	Champions League	Round of 32	(Austria) SV Neulengbach	1–0	0–3	1–3	
2011–12	Champions League	Qualifying Round	(Moldova) Goliador Chisinau	3–0		3rd place	
2011–12	Champions League	Qualifying Round	(North Macedonia) ZFK Nase Taksi	0–1		3rd place	
2011–12	Champions League	Qualifying Round	(Switzerland) YB Frauen	1–1		3rd place	
2012–13	Champions League	Qualifying Round	(North Macedonia) ZFK Nase Taksi	1–0		2nd place	
2012–13	Champions League	Qualifying Round	(Latvia) FC Skonto/Cerība	8–0		2nd place	
2012–13	Champions League	Qualifying Round	(Hungary) MTK Hungária FC	0–2		2nd place	
2013–14	Champions League	Qualifying Round	(Estonia) Pärnu JK	1–3		3rd place	
2013–14	Champions League	Qualifying Round	(North Macedonia) ŽFK Biljanini Izvori	5–0		3rd place	
2013–14	Champions League	Qualifying Round	(Finland) PK-35 Vantaa	1–2		3rd place	
2015–16	Champions League	Qualifying Round	(Northern Ireland) Glentoran Belfast United	4–0		1st place	
2015–16	Champions League	Qualifying Round	(North Macedonia) ŽFK Dragon 2014	10–0		1st place	
2015–16	Champions League	Qualifying Round	(Bulgaria) FC NSA Sofia	4–0		1st place	
2015–16	Champions League	Round of 32	(Sweden) KIF Örebro DFF	0–3	0–5	0–8	
2016–17	Champions League	Qualifying Round	(Kosovo) WFC Hajvalia	1–1		2nd place	
2016–17	Champions League	Qualifying Round	(Faroe Islands) KÍ Klaksvík	1–1		2nd place	
2016–17	Champions League	Qualifying Round	(Cyprus) Apollon Limassol	3–3		2nd place	
2017–18	Champions League	Qualifying Round	(Luxembourg) Bettembourg	8–0		1st place	
2017–18	Champions League	Qualifying Round	(Albania) Vllaznia	1–0		1st place	
2017–18	Champions League	Qualifying Round	(Bosnia and Herzegovina) SFK 2000	3–0		1st place	
2017–18	Champions League	Round of 32	(Czech Republic) Sparta Praha	0–5	0–3	0–8	
2019–20	Champions League	Qualifying Round	(Belgium) Anderlecht	0–5		4th place	
2019–20	Champions League	Qualifying Round	(Norway) LSK Kvinner	0–1		4th place	
2019–20	Champions League	Qualifying Round	(Northern Ireland) Linfield	2–3		4th place	
2020–21	Champions League	First Qualifying Round	(Portugal) Benfica	1–3		1–3	
2021–22	Champions League	First Qualifying Round	(Moldova) Agarista Anenii Noi	6–0		2nd place	
2021–22	Champions League	First Qualifying Round	(Norway) Vålerenga	0–2		2nd place	
2022–23	Champions League	First Qualifying Round	(Wales) Swansea City	2–0		2nd place	
2022–23	Champions League	First Qualifying Round	(Scotland) Rangers	0–4		2nd place	
2023–24	Champions League	First Qualifying Round	(Luxembourg) Racing Union	6–1		2nd place	
2023–24	Champions League	First Qualifying Round	(Austria) St. Pölten	0–3		2nd place	
2024–25	Champions League	First Qualifying Round	(Israel) Kiryat Gat	2–1		2nd place	
2024–25	Champions League	First Qualifying Round	(Switzerland) Servette FC	0–2		2nd place	
2026–27	Champions League	First Qualifying Round	(Israel) Hapoel Katamon Jerusalem	3–1		1st place	
2026–27	Champions League	First Qualifying Round	(Azerbaijan) Neftçi	3–0		1st place	
2026–27	Champions League	Second Qualifying Round	(Hungary) Ferencváros	3–2		2nd place	
2026–27	Champions League	Second Qualifying Round	(Norway) Brann	2–3		2nd place	
2026–27	Europa Cup	Second Qualifying round	(Slovakia) Spartak Myjava	2–3	1–1	3–4	
