= Greek A Division (women's football) =

First-tier women's association football league in Greece

Women's Alpha Ethniki
- Organising body: Hellenic Football Federation (1989); Women's Football Clubs Association (2025)
- Founded: 1989; 37 years ago
- First season: Panellinio Protathlima, Greek: Πανελλήνιο Πρωτάθλημα, lit. 'Panhellenic Championship' (1989–90); Alpha Ethniki Katigoria, Greek: Α΄ Εθνική Κατηγορία, lit. 'First National Division' (1992–93)
- Country: Greece
- Confederation: UEFA
- Number of clubs: 12
- Level on pyramid: 1
- Relegation to: Women's Beta Ethniki
- Domestic cup: Women's Greece Cup
- International cups: UEFA Women's Champions League; UEFA Women's Europa Cup
- Current champions: PAOK (2025–26)
- Most championships: PAOK (20 titles)
- Top scorer: Dimitra Panteliadou (274 goals)
- Broadcaster(s): E.R.T.
- Website: espg.gr
- Current: 2026–27 Greek A Division

The Women's Alpha Ethniki Katigoria (Greek: Α΄ Εθνική Κατηγορία Γυναικών, lit. 'Women's First National Division') is the first-tier women's association football league in Greece, organised by the Women's Football Clubs Association.

The Women's Panhellenic Championship was founded in 1989. Prior to 1989, the championship was organised by the regional Football Clubs Associations. In 1989, the Hellenic Football Federation created a committee on women's association football which organized the Panhellenic Championship. In 1989, the first organization was made by Hellenic Football Federation (E.P.O.), which was named testing and the Hellenic Football Federation did not recognize him as a formal organization. The current champion is AEK Athens with 1 domestic title won in total.

== Format ==
The 2009–10 championship is organized into one group of 7 clubs and one group of 8 clubs. In the first phase of the championship, each club in the first group plays a total of 12 matches (home and away) against the other 6 clubs in the group over 14 rounds, while each club in the second group plays a total of 14 matches (home and away) against the other 7 clubs in the group over 14 rounds. In the second phase, the top three clubs from each group with participate in a new group competition with each club playing 10 matches (home and away) against the other 5 clubs. The clubs which did not finish in the top three of their group in the first phase will be relegated to the regional competition for the 2010–11 season. From the 2026–27 season, all 12 clubs will play a round robin league, so each team plays 22 matches. The champion will be the first-place finisher.

== Current members ==
Locations of the 2026–27 season clubs

The following 12 clubs are competing in the A Division during the 2026–27 season.

- AEK
- Agia Paraskevi
- Asteras Tripolis
- Kifisia
- Odysseas Moschatou
- OFI
- Panathinaikos
- PAOK
- Pyrgos
- REA
- Seirines Grevenon
- Volos

== List of champions ==
The list of champions:

Unofficial (organised by the clubs)
Season	Champion
1986–87	Ilioupoli Thessaloniki
1987–88	Centauros Larisa
1988–89	Doxa Piraeus

Panhellenic Championship
Season	Champion
1989–90	Olympiada Thessaloniki
1990–91	Doxa Piraeus
1991–92	Doxa Piraeus

First National Division
Season	Champion
1992–93	Kavala 86
1993–94	Doxa Piraeus
1994–95	Doxa Piraeus
1995–96	Olympiada Thessaloniki
1996–97	Ilioupoli Thessaloniki
1997–98	Olympiada Thessaloniki
1998–99	Union Doxa/Artemis Piraeus
1999–2000	Filyriakos Florina
2000–01	Kavala 86
2001–02	PAOK
2002–03	A.E. Aeginas
2003–04	A.E. Aeginas
2004–05	A.E. Aeginas
2005–06	PAOK
2006–07	PAOK
2007–08	PAOK
2008–09	PAOK
2009–10	PAOK
2010–11	PAOK
2011–12	PAOK
2012–13	PAOK
2013–14	Amazones Dramas
2014–15	PAOK
2015–16	PAOK
2016–17	PAOK
2017–18	PAOK
2018–19	PAOK
2019–20	PAOK
2020–21	PAOK
2021–22	PAOK
2022–23	PAOK
2023–24	PAOK
2024–25	AEK Athens
2025–26	PAOK

== Performance by club ==
Club	Titles	Season
PAOK	20	2002, 2006, 2007, 2008, 2009, 2010, 2011, 2012, 2013, 2015, 2016, 2017, 2018, 2019, 2020, 2021, 2022, 2023, 2024, 2026
Doxa Piraeus	4	1991, 1992, 1994, 1995
Olympiada Thessaloniki	3	1990, 1996, 1998
A.E. Aeginas	3	2003, 2004, 2005
Kavala 86	2	1993, 2001
Ilioupoli Thessaloniki	1	1997
Union Doxa/Artemis Piraeus	1	1999
Filyriakos Florina	1	2000
Amazones Dramas	1	2014
AEK Athens	1	2025

== Individual statistics ==
=== Top goalscorer by season ===
Season	Player(s)	Club(s)	Goals	Ref.
2002–03	(Greece) Angeliki Lagoumtzi	Aegina	24	
2006–07	(Greece) Dimitra Kossova	Pampatraikos	19	
2010–11	(Greece) Sophia Koggouli	Elpides Karditsas	27	
2011–12	(Greece) Sophia Koggouli	Elpides Karditsas	21	
2012–13	(Greece) Sophia Koggouli	Elpides Karditsas	18	
2013–14	(Greece) Sophia Koggouli	Elpides Karditsas	23	
2014–15	(Greece) Sophia Koggouli	Elpides Karditsas	24	
2015–16	(Greece) Sophia Koggouli	Elpides Karditsas	25	
2016–17	(Greece) Eleni Markou	PAOK	18	
2016–17	(Colombia) Gisela Betancourt	Elpides Karditsas	18	
2017–18	(Greece) Eleni Markou	PAOK	27	
2018–19	(Colombia) Gisela Betancourt	PAOK	30	
2019–20	(Colombia) Gisela Betancourt	PAOK	25	
2020–21	(Greece) Anastasia Spyridonidou	PAOK	22	
2021–22	(Kenya) Esse Akida	PAOK	17	
2022–23	(Slovakia) Nikola Rybanská	OFI	17	
2023–24	(Slovakia) Nikola Rybanská	OFI	24	
2024–25	(Slovakia) Nikola Rybanská	OFI	22	
2025–26	(Bosnia and Herzegovina) Minela Gačanica	PAOK	23	

Most times Goalscorer

- 6 times.
  - (Greece) Sophia Koggouli (2010-11, 2011-12, 2012-13, 2013-14, 2014-15 and 2015-16)

Most goals by a player in a single season

- 30 goals.
  - (Colombia) Gisela Betancourt (2018–19).

== See also ==
- Greek Women's Cup
