= 2014 UEFA Women's Under-17 Championship qualification =

Football tournament qualification stage

The qualification rounds for the 2014 UEFA Women's Under-17 Championship were a series of association football matches between national teams to determine the participants to the European Youth Championship. The first matches were played on 2 July 2013.

All times are CEST (UTC+02:00).

== Qualification modus ==
| | Teams entering in this round | Teams advancing from previous round | Competition format |
|---|---|---|---|
| Qualifying round (40 teams) | 40 teams from associations ranked 3–53 | | 10 groups of 4 teams, hosted by one nation, seeded into four pots by UEFA coefficient |
| Elite round (24 teams) | Germany; Spain; France | 10 group winners and runners-up from qualifying round; 1 best third-place finisher from qualifying round | 6 groups of 4 teams, hosted by one nation, seeded into four pots by UEFA coefficient |
| Final tournament (8 teams) | England | 6 group winners from elite round; 1 best runner-up from elite round | 2 groups of 4 teams, semi-finals, final |

== Qualifying round ==
The qualifying round was played from 2 July to 11 August 2013. Top seeded teams Germany, Spain and France received a bye to the second round. The draw was made on 20 November 2012.

=== Tiebreakers ===
Tie-breakers between teams with the same number of points are:

1. Higher number of points obtained in the matches played between the teams in question
2. Superior goal difference resulting from the matches played between the teams in question
3. Higher number of goals scored in the matches played between the teams in question

If now two teams still are tied, reapply tie-breakers 1–3, if this does not break the tie, go on.

1. Superior goal difference in all group matches
2. Higher number of goals scored in all group matches
3. Drawing of lots

=== Group 1 ===
Hosted by Scotland.

| Team | Pld | W | D | L | GF | GA | GD | Pts |
|---|---|---|---|---|---|---|---|---|
| Czech Republic | 3 | 2 | 0 | 1 | 18 | 4 | +14 | 6 |
| Scotland | 3 | 2 | 0 | 1 | 10 | 6 | +4 | 6 |
| Northern Ireland | 3 | 2 | 0 | 1 | 9 | 8 | +1 | 6 |
| Montenegro | 3 | 0 | 0 | 3 | 1 | 20 | −19 | 0 |

2 August 2013
16:00

| Czech Republic | 3–4 | Northern Ireland |
|---|---|---|
| Szewieczková 6'; Křivská 58' (pen.), 80+1' (pen.) | Report | Mackin 9', 20', 37'; Burden 46' |

Harlaw Park, Inverurie
Referee: Beatriz Gil Gozalo (Spain)
2 August 2013
20:00

| Scotland | 5–1 | Montenegro |
|---|---|---|
| Jackson 8'; Howat 48', 69'; C. Brown 61'; Cuthbert 72' | Report | Bojat 47' |

Harlaw Park, Inverurie
Referee: Irina Gavrilova (Kazakhstan)

4 August 2013
14:00

| Northern Ireland | 1–5 | Scotland |
|---|---|---|
| Mackin 40' | Report | Cornet 7'; Rafferty 12'; Walker 25', 40+2', 77' |

North Lodge Park, Pitmedden
Attendance: 425
Referee: Tania Fernandes Morais (Luxembourg)
4 August 2013
18:00

| Czech Republic | 11–0 | Montenegro |
|---|---|---|
| Daňková 2', 42', 71'; Braunerová 6'; Veselá 10', 26', 54'; Křivská 22', 58', 79'; Majerová 78' | Report |

North Lodge Park, Pitmedden
Referee: Irina Gavrilova (Kazakhstan)

7 August 2013
20:00

| Scotland | 0–4 | Czech Republic |
|---|---|---|
| | Report | Křivská 23', 49'; Majerová 60'; Szewieczková 63' |

Harlaw Park, Inverurie
Referee: Beatriz Gil Gozalo (Spain)
7 August 2013
20:00

| Montenegro | 0–4 | Northern Ireland |
|---|---|---|
| | Report | Doherty 7'; Connolly 7', 28', 74' |

North Lodge Park, Pitmedden
Referee: Tania Fernandes Morais (Luxembourg)

=== Group 2 ===
Hosted by Estonia.

| Team | Pld | W | D | L | GF | GA | GD | Pts |
|---|---|---|---|---|---|---|---|---|
| Norway | 3 | 3 | 0 | 0 | 16 | 1 | +15 | 9 |
| Romania | 3 | 2 | 0 | 1 | 7 | 5 | +2 | 6 |
| Croatia | 3 | 1 | 0 | 2 | 4 | 8 | −4 | 3 |
| Estonia | 3 | 0 | 0 | 3 | 1 | 14 | −13 | 0 |

29 July 2013
13:30

| Norway | 5–1 | Croatia |
|---|---|---|
| Dekkerhus 11'; Fjelldal 13'; Haugland 19'; Hafnor 67'; Markussen 74' | Report | Balić 40' |

Kadrioru Stadium, Tallinn
Referee: Evgenia Kaskantiri (Greece)
29 July 2013
16:30

| Romania | 5–0 | Estonia |
|---|---|---|
| Petre 10'; Ciolacu 18'; Vasile 58', 68'; Indrei 65' | Report |

Tallinn Youth Training Centre, Tallinn
Referee: Barbara Bollenberg (Austria)

31 July 2013
13:30

| Croatia | 1–2 | Romania |
|---|---|---|
| Mihić 65' | Report | Ciolacu 10'; Ambruș 48' |

Kadrioru Stadium, Tallinn
Referee: Dimitrina Milkova (Bulgaria)
31 July 2013
16:30

| Norway | 7–0 | Estonia |
|---|---|---|
| Kleppe 17'; Hafnor 23'; Haugland 35'; Døvle 38'; Lie 47'; Markussen 70', 79' | Report |

Lilleküla Stadium, Tallinn
Referee: Barbara Bollenberg (Austria)

3 August 2013
13:30

| Romania | 0–4 | Norway |
|---|---|---|
| | Report | Markussen 49', 75'; Tărășilă 71' (o.g.); Døvle 80+3' |

Kadrioru Stadium, Tallinn
Referee: Evgenia Kaskantiri (Greece)
3 August 2013
13:30

| Estonia | 1–2 | Croatia |
|---|---|---|
| Tammik 63' | Report | Zrno 80+1'; Mihić 80+3' |

Lilleküla Stadium, Tallinn
Referee: Dimitrina Milkova (Bulgaria)

=== Group 3 ===
Hosted by Ukraine.

| Team | Pld | W | D | L | GF | GA | GD | Pts |
|---|---|---|---|---|---|---|---|---|
| Finland | 3 | 2 | 1 | 0 | 6 | 2 | +4 | 7 |
| Netherlands | 3 | 2 | 0 | 1 | 8 | 2 | +6 | 6 |
| Slovakia | 3 | 0 | 2 | 1 | 5 | 9 | −4 | 2 |
| Ukraine | 3 | 0 | 1 | 2 | 4 | 10 | −6 | 1 |

2 August 2013
16:00

| Finland | 2–2 | Slovakia |
|---|---|---|
| Kauppi 57'; Ahtinen 62' | Report | Maťavková 14', 30' |

Ukraina Stadium, Lviv
Referee: Graziella Pirriatore (Italy)
2 August 2013
17:00

| Netherlands | 4–1 | Ukraine |
|---|---|---|
| Van Der Linden 3'; Admiraal 16'; Van Gurp 29'; Folkertsma 80' | Report | Levytska 49' |

Arena Lviv, Lviv
Referee: Lorraine Clark (Scotland)

4 August 2013
15:00

| Netherlands | 4–0 | Slovakia |
|---|---|---|
| Van Gurp 45', 51', 70'; Achterhof 62' | Report |

Ukraina Stadium, Lviv
Referee: Graziella Pirriatore (Italy)
4 August 2013
17:00

| Ukraine | 0–3 | Finland |
|---|---|---|
| | Report | Bröijer 44'; Rantanen 48', 68' |

Arena Lviv, Lviv
Referee: Ivana Projkovska (Macedonia)

7 August 2013
17:00

| Finland | 1–0 | Netherlands |
|---|---|---|
| Collin 40+3' | Report |

Ukraina Stadium, Lviv
Referee: Lorraine Clark (Scotland)
7 August 2013
17:00

| Slovakia | 3–3 | Ukraine |
|---|---|---|
| Havranová 40'; Fabová 43'; Maťavková 65' | Report | Holovach 29'; Ruban 49'; Shevchuk 56' |

Arena Lviv, Lviv
Referee: Ivana Projkovska (Macedonia)

=== Group 4 ===
Hosted by Russia.

| Team | Pld | W | D | L | GF | GA | GD | Pts |
|---|---|---|---|---|---|---|---|---|
| Russia | 3 | 3 | 0 | 0 | 3 | 0 | +3 | 9 |
| Republic of Ireland | 3 | 2 | 0 | 1 | 13 | 2 | +11 | 6 |
| Turkey | 3 | 1 | 0 | 2 | 3 | 2 | +1 | 3 |
| Bosnia and Herzegovina | 3 | 0 | 0 | 3 | 1 | 16 | −15 | 0 |

6 August 2013
11:00

| Republic of Ireland | 12–1 | Bosnia and Herzegovina |
|---|---|---|
| Lynch 13'; Mclaughlin 15', 37', 67'; Connolly 17', 56' (pen.), 75'; Gargan 28', 32', 51', 60'; Keenan 40' | Report | Lihović 59' |

Trud Stadion, Ulyanovsk
Referee: Marija Kurtes (Germany)
6 August 2013
16:00

| Russia | 1–0 | Turkey |
|---|---|---|
| Voloshina 44' | Report |

Trud Stadion, Ulyanovsk
Referee: Biljana Lukić (Serbia)

8 August 2013
11:00

| Republic of Ireland | 1–0 | Turkey |
|---|---|---|
| Connolly 18' | Report |

Trud Stadion, Ulyanovsk
Referee: Biljana Lukić (Serbia)
8 August 2013
16:00

| Bosnia and Herzegovina | 0–1 | Russia |
|---|---|---|
| | Report | Khotyreva 62' |

Trud Stadion, Ulyanovsk
Referee: Zuzana Strpkova (Slovakia)

11 August 2013
16:00

| Turkey | 3–0 | Bosnia and Herzegovina |
|---|---|---|
| Sivrikaya 62', 66', 79' | Report |

Torpedo, Dimitrovgrad
Referee: Zuzana Strpkova (Slovakia)
11 August 2013
16:00

| Russia | 1–0 | Republic of Ireland |
|---|---|---|
| Khotyreva 42' | Report |

Trud Stadion, Ulyanovsk
Referee: Marija Kurtes (Germany)

=== Group 5 ===
Hosted by Moldova.

| Team | Pld | W | D | L | GF | GA | GD | Pts |
|---|---|---|---|---|---|---|---|---|
| Hungary | 3 | 2 | 1 | 0 | 15 | 2 | +13 | 7 |
| Iceland | 3 | 2 | 1 | 0 | 13 | 2 | +11 | 7 |
| Moldova | 3 | 0 | 1 | 2 | 1 | 12 | −11 | 1 |
| Latvia | 3 | 0 | 1 | 2 | 1 | 14 | −13 | 1 |

30 July 2013
17:00

| Iceland | 5–0 | Latvia |
|---|---|---|
| Arnarsdóttir 6', 21'; Sigurdardóttir 31', 37'; Hlynsdóttir 51' | Report |

District Sport Complex, Orhei
Attendance: 100
Referee: Irina Tereshchenko (Russia)
30 July 2013
17:00

| Hungary | 5–0 | Moldova |
|---|---|---|
| Csányi 2', 11'; Kaján 15'; Ferencz 26'; Szabó 48' | Report |

CPSM, Vadul lui Vodă
Attendance: 200
Referee: Justyna Zajac (Poland)

1 August 2013
17:00

| Iceland | 6–0 | Moldova |
|---|---|---|
| Sigurdardóttir 6', 8', 61'; H. Jónsdóttir 50'; Arnarsdóttir 55', 74' | Report |

District Sport Complex, Orhei
Attendance: 200
Referee: Justyna Zajac (Poland)
1 August 2013
17:00

| Latvia | 0–8 | Hungary |
|---|---|---|
| | Report | Kaján 15', 60' (pen.); Gruber 22'; Krascsenics 46', 76'; Csányi 48'; Szakonyi 55'; Szabó 66' |

CPSM, Vadul lui Voda
Attendance: 50
Referee: Cristina Bujor (Romania)

4 August 2013
17:00

| Hungary | 2–2 | Iceland |
|---|---|---|
| Vancsik 60'; P. Krascsenics 75' | Report | H. Jónsdóttir 56'; S. Sigurdardóttir 63' |

District Sport Complex, Orhei
Attendance: 100
Referee: Irina Tereshchenko (Russia)
4 August 2013
17:00

| Moldova | 1–1 | Latvia |
|---|---|---|
| Mițul 78' | Report | Tarasova 57' |

CPSM, Vadul lui Voda
Attendance: 200
Referee: Cristina Bujor (Romania)

=== Group 6 ===
Hosted by Israel.

| Team | Pld | W | D | L | GF | GA | GD | Pts |
|---|---|---|---|---|---|---|---|---|
| Sweden | 3 | 3 | 0 | 0 | 14 | 1 | +13 | 9 |
| Portugal | 3 | 2 | 0 | 1 | 4 | 3 | +1 | 6 |
| Serbia | 3 | 1 | 0 | 2 | 3 | 6 | −3 | 3 |
| Israel | 3 | 0 | 0 | 3 | 1 | 12 | −11 | 0 |

2 August 2013
16:00

| Sweden | 3–0 | Portugal |
|---|---|---|
| Blomqvist 42'; Björn 52', 80' | Report |

National team complex, Shefayim
Referee: Marta Frias Acedo (Spain)
2 August 2013
16:00

| Serbia | 2–1 | Israel |
|---|---|---|
| Arandjelović 20', 26' | Report | Eide 73' |

Ramat Gan Stadium, Ramat Gan
Referee: Tanja Subotič (Slovenia)

4 August 2013
16:30

| Portugal | 2–0 | Serbia |
|---|---|---|
| Nadine Cordeiro 11'; Carolina Ferreira 73' | Report |

National team complex, Shefayim
Referee: Iryna Petrova (Ukraine)
4 August 2013
18:30

| Sweden | 8–0 | Israel |
|---|---|---|
| Persson 26'; Handfast 39'; Angeldal 40+2', 60'; Anvegård 44'; Ökvist 50'; Renlund 77'; Nilsson 80+3' | Report |

Ramat Gan Stadium, Ramat Gan
Referee: Tanja Subotič (Slovenia)

7 August 2013
17:30

| Israel | 0–2 | Portugal |
|---|---|---|
| | Report | Carolina Ferreira 33', 69' |

Netanya Stadium, Netanya
Referee: Iryna Petrova (Ukraine)
7 August 2013
17:30

| Serbia | 1–3 | Sweden |
|---|---|---|
| Blagojević 35' | Report | Zigiotti Olme 26'; Angeldal 32'; Nilsson 53' |

National team complex, Shefayim
Referee: Marta Frias Acedo (Spain)

=== Group 7 ===
Hosted by Slovenia.

| Team | Pld | W | D | L | GF | GA | GD | Pts |
|---|---|---|---|---|---|---|---|---|
| Belgium | 3 | 3 | 0 | 0 | 13 | 0 | +13 | 9 |
| Belarus | 3 | 2 | 0 | 1 | 8 | 6 | +2 | 6 |
| Slovenia | 3 | 1 | 0 | 2 | 11 | 9 | +2 | 3 |
| Lithuania | 3 | 0 | 0 | 3 | 0 | 17 | −17 | 0 |

6 August 2013
17:00

| Belgium | 3–0 | Belarus |
|---|---|---|
| Maximus 44', 55'; De Smet 61' (pen.) | Report |

Bakovci Stadium, Bakovci
Referee: Monica Larsen (Norway)
6 August 2013
17:00

| Slovenia | 8–0 | Lithuania |
|---|---|---|
| Gadnik 12', 46'; Horvat 26'; Kolbl 51'; Ivanuša 61'; Prašnikar 64' (pen.), 80+3'; Babnik 75' | Report |

NK Odranci, Odranci
Referee: Kristina Husballe (Denmark)

8 August 2013
17:00

| Belgium | 5–0 | Lithuania |
|---|---|---|
| Janssens 16'; Baldewijns 33'; De Smet 36'; Velde 76'; Awete 80' | Report |

Bakovci Stadium, Bakovci
Referee: Kristina Husballe (Denmark)
8 August 2013
17:00

| Belarus | 4–3 | Slovenia |
|---|---|---|
| Dranouskaya 2', 34'; Shuppo 51', 80' | Report | Ivanuša 26', 57' (pen.), 60' |

NK Odranci, Odranci
Referee: Silvia Domingos (Portugal)

11 August 2013
17:00

| Slovenia | 0–5 | Belgium |
|---|---|---|
| | Report | Vangheluwe 3'; Janssens 21'; De Smet 34'; Appermont 41'; Maximus 56' |

NK Odranci, Odranci
Referee: Monica Larsen (Norway)
11 August 2013
17:00

| Lithuania | 0–4 | Belarus |
|---|---|---|
| | Report | Dranouskaya 7'; Buividaviciutė 40' (o.g.); Stsezhko 48'; Shuppo 64' |

Bakovci Stadium, Bakovci
Referee: Silvia Domingos (Portugal)

=== Group 8 ===
Hosted by Poland.

| Team | Pld | W | D | L | GF | GA | GD | Pts |
|---|---|---|---|---|---|---|---|---|
| Austria | 3 | 3 | 0 | 0 | 18 | 0 | +18 | 9 |
| Poland | 3 | 2 | 0 | 1 | 14 | 1 | +13 | 6 |
| Azerbaijan | 3 | 1 | 0 | 2 | 2 | 12 | −10 | 3 |
| Kazakhstan | 3 | 0 | 0 | 3 | 0 | 21 | −21 | 0 |

2 August 2013
13:00

| Austria | 7–0 | Azerbaijan |
|---|---|---|
| Schmid 26', 45', 49'; Pinther 52', 68'; Georgieva 63', 74' | Report |

Kuzniczka Stadium, Kedzierzyn-Kozle
Referee: Donka Jeleva-Terzieva (Bulgaria)
2 August 2013
18:00

| Poland | 9–0 | Kazakhstan |
|---|---|---|
| Jędrzejewicz 13', 28', 37'; Matysik 30', 52'; Dudek 33', 42', 51' (pen.); Lizoń 67' | Report |

Mosir Brzeg, Brzeg
Referee: Vivian Peeters (Netherlands)

4 August 2013
13:00

| Kazakhstan | 0–10 | Austria |
|---|---|---|
| | Report | Feric 16', 53', 74'; Knauseder 25' (pen.), 43' (pen.); Schmid 26'; Pinther 37', 40+1', 56'; Kofler 73' |

Kuzniczka Stadium, Kedzierzyn-Kozle
Referee: Marianne Svendsen (Denmark)
4 August 2013
18:00

| Poland | 5–0 | Azerbaijan |
|---|---|---|
| Grabowska 20', 56', 58'; Jędrzejewicz 48'; Mesjasz 80+2' | Report |

Mosir Brzeg, Brzeg
Referee: Donka Jeleva-Terzieva (Bulgaria)

7 August 2013
18:00

| Austria | 1–0 | Poland |
|---|---|---|
| Kofler 36' | Report |

Mosir Brzeg, Brzeg
Referee: Vivian Peeters (Netherlands)
7 August 2013
18:00

| Azerbaijan | 2–0 | Kazakhstan |
|---|---|---|
| Alimova 33'; Gluic 57' | Report |

Kuzniczka Stadium, Kedzierzyn-Kozle
Referee: Marianne Svendsen (Denmark)

=== Group 9 ===
Hosted by Bulgaria.

| Team | Pld | W | D | L | GF | GA | GD | Pts |
|---|---|---|---|---|---|---|---|---|
| Italy | 3 | 3 | 0 | 0 | 21 | 1 | +20 | 9 |
| Switzerland | 3 | 2 | 0 | 1 | 19 | 5 | +14 | 6 |
| Bulgaria | 3 | 1 | 0 | 2 | 2 | 17 | −15 | 3 |
| Macedonia | 3 | 0 | 0 | 3 | 1 | 20 | −19 | 0 |

2 July 2013
17:00

| Switzerland | 6–0 | Bulgaria |
|---|---|---|
| Widmer 21'; Germanier 27'; Imhof 38'; Fasel 42' (pen.); Geissbühler 44'; Stierli 80+1' | Report |

Druzhba Stadium, Dobrich
Attendance: 50
Referee: Paula Brady (Ireland)
2 July 2013
17:00

| Italy | 6–0 | Macedonia |
|---|---|---|
| Giugliano 2', 22' (pen.); Nikolova 6' (o.g.); Simonetti 10'; Mella 37'; Vigilucci 73' | Report |

Kaliakra Stadium, Kavarna
Attendance: 40
Referee: Svetlana Cebanu (Moldova)

4 July 2013
17:00

| Switzerland | 12–0 | Macedonia |
|---|---|---|
| Ameti 3', 80+2'; Stierli 16', 32'; Zehnder 28'; Germanier 36', 49'; Villiger 53', 75'; Geissbühler 66', 72'; Skerlevska 77' (o.g.) | Report |

Kaliakra Stadium, Kavarna
Attendance: 50
Referee: Svetlana Cebanu (Moldova)
4 July 2013
17:00

| Bulgaria | 0–10 | Italy |
|---|---|---|
| | Report | Boattin 4', 13'; Bergamaschi 17', 19', 32'; Vigilucci 36', 38', 49'; Mascarello 58' (pen.); Simonetti 75' |

Druzhba Stadium, Dobrich
Attendance: 60
Referee: Ruzanna Petrosyan (Armenia)

7 July 2013
17:00

| Italy | 5–1 | Switzerland |
|---|---|---|
| Vigilucci 17'; Bergamaschi 25', 34'; Giugliano 38', 80+2' | Report | Ameti 13' |

Kaliakra Stadium Kavarna
Attendance: 50
Referee: Paula Brady (Ireland)
7 July 2013
17:00

| Bulgaria | 2–1 | Macedonia |
|---|---|---|
| Petkova 4', 43' | Report | Skerlevska 8' |

Druzhba Stadium, Dobrich
Attendance: 100
Referee: Ruzanna Petrosyan (Armenia)

=== Group 10 ===
Hosted by Denmark.

| Team | Pld | W | D | L | GF | GA | GD | Pts |
|---|---|---|---|---|---|---|---|---|
| Denmark | 3 | 2 | 1 | 0 | 18 | 3 | +15 | 7 |
| Greece | 3 | 2 | 1 | 0 | 6 | 4 | +2 | 7 |
| Wales | 3 | 1 | 0 | 2 | 3 | 8 | −5 | 3 |
| Faroe Islands | 3 | 0 | 0 | 3 | 2 | 14 | −12 | 0 |

5 August 2013
15:00

| Denmark | 9–0 | Faroe Islands |
|---|---|---|
| Bruun 6', 22', 42'; Schioldan 9'; N. Sørensen 30', 37'; Henriksen 34', 73'; Carstensen 51' | Report |

Ballerup, Ballerup
Referee: Ana Jovanović (Serbia)
5 August 2013
15:00

| Wales | 0–1 | Greece |
|---|---|---|
| | Report | Zerva 67' |

Gladsaxe, Søborg
Referee: Elvira Nurmustafina (Kazakhstan)

7 August 2013
15:00

| Denmark | 2–2 | Greece |
|---|---|---|
| Bruun 60'; Henriksen 80+3' (pen.) | Report | Kaldaridou 18'; Zerva 38' |

Gladsaxe, Søborg
Referee: Elvira Nurmustafina (Kazakhstan)
7 August 2013
15:00

| Faroe Islands | 0–2 | Wales |
|---|---|---|
| | Report | Doran 46'; Nolan 53' |

Brøndby, Brondby
Referee: Kateryna Zora (Ukraine)

10 August 2013
14:00

| Wales | 1–7 | Denmark |
|---|---|---|
| Fuller 48' | Report | Dybdahl 7', 11', 63'; N. Sørensen 40+2'; Carstensen 54'; Bruun 73'; Lindhardt 80+3' |

Brøndby, Brondby
Referee: Ana Jovanović (Serbia)
10 August 2013
14:00

| Greece | 3–2 | Faroe Islands |
|---|---|---|
| Sarri 11'; Konstantopoulou 33'; Kaldaridou 51' (pen.) | Report | Arge 55', 80+2' (pen.) |

Ballerup, Ballerup
Referee: Kateryna Zora (Ukraine)

=== Ranking of third-placed teams ===
To determine the best third-placed team from the qualifying round, only the results against the top two teams in each group were taken into account.

The following criteria are applied to determine the rankings:

1. higher number of points obtained in these matches
2. superior goal difference from these matches
3. higher number of goals scored in these matches
4. fair play conduct of the teams in all group matches in the qualifying round
5. drawing of lots

| Grp | Team | Pld | W | D | L | GF | GA | GD | Pts |
|---|---|---|---|---|---|---|---|---|---|
| 1 | Northern Ireland | 2 | 1 | 0 | 1 | 5 | 8 | −3 | 3 |
| 3 | Slovakia | 2 | 0 | 1 | 1 | 2 | 6 | −4 | 1 |
| 4 | Turkey | 2 | 0 | 0 | 2 | 0 | 2 | −2 | 0 |
| 6 | Serbia | 2 | 0 | 0 | 2 | 1 | 5 | −4 | 0 |
| 2 | Croatia | 2 | 0 | 0 | 2 | 2 | 7 | −5 | 0 |
| 7 | Slovenia | 2 | 0 | 0 | 2 | 3 | 9 | −6 | 0 |
| 10 | Wales | 2 | 0 | 0 | 2 | 1 | 8 | −7 | 0 |
| 5 | Moldova | 2 | 0 | 0 | 2 | 0 | 11 | −11 | 0 |
| 8 | Azerbaijan | 2 | 0 | 0 | 2 | 0 | 12 | −12 | 0 |
| 9 | Bulgaria | 2 | 0 | 0 | 2 | 0 | 16 | −16 | 0 |

== Elite round ==
21 teams from the qualifying round are joined by Germany, Spain and France to make it a total of 24 teams. The round consists of six groups with four teams in each group. Group winners and the best second-placed team advance to the final tournament in England. The draw was held on 15 August 2013.

=== Tiebreakers ===
Tie-breakers between teams with the same number of points are:

1. Higher number of points obtained in the matches played between the teams in question
2. Superior goal difference resulting from the matches played between the teams in question
3. Higher number of goals scored in the matches played between the teams in question

If now two teams still are tied, reapply tie-breakers 1–3, if this does not break the tie, go on.

1. Superior goal difference in all group matches
2. Higher number of goals scored in all group matches
3. Drawing of lots

=== Group 1 ===
Hosted by Romania.

| Team | Pld | W | D | L | GF | GA | GD | Pts |
|---|---|---|---|---|---|---|---|---|
| Spain | 3 | 3 | 0 | 0 | 13 | 2 | +11 | 9 |
| Republic of Ireland | 3 | 2 | 0 | 1 | 7 | 3 | +4 | 6 |
| Iceland | 3 | 1 | 0 | 2 | 4 | 6 | −2 | 3 |
| Romania | 3 | 0 | 0 | 3 | 1 | 14 | −13 | 0 |

30 September 2013
13:00

| Spain | 2–1 | Republic of Ireland |
|---|---|---|
| Falcón 18'; Garrote 33' | Report | Clifford 34' |

Football Centre FRF, Buftea
Referee: Zuzana Strpkova (Slovakia)
30 September 2013
17:00

| Iceland | 2–1 | Romania |
|---|---|---|
| H. Jónsdóttir 57', 71' | Report | Ambruș 48' |

Football Centre FRF, Buftea
Referee: Barbara Bollenberg (Austria)

2 October 2013
14:00

| Spain | 8–0 | Romania |
|---|---|---|
| García 18', 74', 80+3'; Falcón 24'; García Boa 48'; Oroz 51'; Guijarro 56'; Galvez 69' | Report |

Football Centre FR, Buftea
Referee: Ruzanna Petrosyan (Armenia)
2 October 2013
16:00

| Republic of Ireland | 2–1 | Iceland |
|---|---|---|
| McKevitt 32'; Connolly 51' | Report | Arnarsdóttir 80' (pen.) |

Football Centre FRF, Buftea
Referee: Barbara Bollenberg (Austria)

5 October 2013
10:00

| Iceland | 1–3 | Spain |
|---|---|---|
| H. Arnarsdóttir 68' | Report | Domínguez 52'; García 72', 80' |

Football Centre FR, Buftea
Referee: Zuzana Strpkova (Slovakia)
5 October 2013
10:00

| Romania | 0–4 | Republic of Ireland |
|---|---|---|
| | Report | Gargan 6'; Barabasi 21' (o.g.); McKevitt 30'; Lynch 60' |

Football Centre FRF, Mogoșoaia
Referee: Ruzanna Petrosyan (Armenia)

=== Group 2 ===
Hosted by Austria.

| Team | Pld | W | D | L | GF | GA | GD | Pts |
|---|---|---|---|---|---|---|---|---|
| Austria | 3 | 3 | 0 | 0 | 13 | 2 | +11 | 9 |
| Greece | 3 | 1 | 1 | 1 | 5 | 4 | +1 | 4 |
| Russia | 3 | 1 | 1 | 1 | 5 | 8 | −3 | 4 |
| Belarus | 3 | 0 | 0 | 3 | 3 | 12 | −9 | 0 |

8 October 2013
11:00

| Russia | 3–2 | Belarus |
|---|---|---|
| Andreeva 25', 27'; Bychkova 76' | Report | Vasilyeva 2'; Stsezhko 80' |

Sportschule Müss, Fussach
Referee: Lorraine Clark (Scotland)
8 October 2013
18:00

| Austria | 2–1 | Greece |
|---|---|---|
| Gagara 41' (o.g.); Georgieva 78' (pen.) | Report | Moraitou 18' (pen.) |

Birkenwiese, Dornbirn
Referee: Cristina Bujor (Romania)

10 October 2013
11:00

| Greece | 1–1 | Russia |
|---|---|---|
| Kotsaki 27' | Report | Zerva 52' (o.g.) |

Birkenwiese, Dornbirn
Referee: Dimitrina Milkova (Bulgaria)
10 October 2013
18:00

| Austria | 6–0 | Belarus |
|---|---|---|
| Wasserbauer 7'; Pinther 18'; Kofler 41', 61', 68'; Georgieva 80+3' (pen.) | Report |

Casino-Stadion, Bregenz
Referee: Lorraine Clark (Scotland)

13 October 2013
15:00

| Russia | 1–5 | Austria |
|---|---|---|
| Andreeva 3' | Report | Wasserbauer 31', 54'; Kofler 39', 51', 67' |

Birkenwiese, Dornbirn
Referee: Cristina Bujor (Romania)
13 October 2013
15:00

| Belarus | 1–3 | Greece |
|---|---|---|
| Shuppo 40' | Report | Kotsaki 32'; Zerva 36'; Sarri 76' |

Casino-Stadion, Bregenz
Referee: Dimitrina Milkova (Bulgaria)

=== Group 3 ===
Hosted by Portugal.

| Team | Pld | W | D | L | GF | GA | GD | Pts |
|---|---|---|---|---|---|---|---|---|
| Italy | 3 | 2 | 0 | 1 | 4 | 3 | +1 | 6 |
| Portugal | 3 | 1 | 2 | 0 | 3 | 2 | +1 | 5 |
| Czech Republic | 3 | 1 | 1 | 1 | 4 | 2 | +2 | 4 |
| Denmark | 3 | 0 | 1 | 2 | 1 | 5 | −4 | 1 |

15 October 2013
16:00

| Italy | 1–0 | Czech Republic |
|---|---|---|
| Giugliano 62' | Report |

Municipal de Abrantes, Abrantes
Referee: Vesna Budimir (Croatia)
15 October 2013
17:00

| Denmark | 0–0 | Portugal |
|---|---|---|
| | Report |

Municipal, Fátima
Referee: Agnieszka Plaskocinska (Poland)

17 October 2013
16:00

| Czech Republic | 3–0 | Denmark |
|---|---|---|
| Křivská 40+2'; Kovaříková 42'; Obel 80+5' (o.g.) | Report |

Complexo Desportivo do Bonito, Entroncamento
Referee: Evgenia Kaskantiri (Greece)
17 October 2013
17:00

| Italy | 1–2 | Portugal |
|---|---|---|
| Giugliano 74' | Report | Pereira 58'; Azevedo 80+3' |

Municipal, Torres Novas
Referee: Agnieszka Plaskocinska (Poland)

20 October 2013
17:00

| Denmark | 1–2 | Italy |
|---|---|---|
| Bruun 17' | Report | Giugliano 13'; Serturini 74' |

Municipal de Abrantes, Abrantes
Referee: Vesna Budimir (Croatia)
20 October 2013
17:00

| Portugal | 1–1 | Czech Republic |
|---|---|---|
| Silva 25' | Report | Stárová 12' |

Municipal, Torres Novas
Referee: Evgenia Kaskantiri (Greece)

=== Group 4 ===
Hosted by Northern Ireland.

| Team | Pld | W | D | L | GF | GA | GD | Pts |
|---|---|---|---|---|---|---|---|---|
| France | 3 | 3 | 0 | 0 | 6 | 0 | +6 | 9 |
| Sweden | 3 | 1 | 1 | 1 | 4 | 3 | +1 | 4 |
| Poland | 3 | 1 | 1 | 1 | 3 | 5 | −2 | 4 |
| Northern Ireland | 3 | 0 | 0 | 3 | 0 | 5 | −5 | 0 |

12 October 2013
15:00

| France | 3–0 | Poland |
|---|---|---|
| Julian 26'; Lahmari 33'; Uffren 80+3' | Report |

Solitude, Belfast
Referee: Marija Kurtes (Germany)
12 October 2013
20:00

| Sweden | 2–0 | Northern Ireland |
|---|---|---|
| Blomqvist 28', 56' | Report |

Solitude, Belfast
Referee: Melis Özçiğdem (Turkey)

14 October 2013
15:00

| Poland | 2–2 | Sweden |
|---|---|---|
| Lizoń 50'; Grabowska 80+2' | Report | Blomqvist 10'; Zigiotti Olme 22' |

Showgrounds, Ballymena
Referee: Ivana Vlaić (Bosnia and Herzegovina)
14 October 2013
20:00

| France | 2–0 | Northern Ireland |
|---|---|---|
| Jouanno 24', 80+2' | Report |

Stangmore Park, Dungannon
Referee: Melis Özçiğdem (Turkey)

17 October 2013
15:00

| Sweden | 0–1 | France |
|---|---|---|
| | Report | Morroni 73' |

Stangmore Park, Dungannon
Referee: Marija Kurtes (Germany)
17 October 2013
15:00

| Northern Ireland | 0–1 | Poland |
|---|---|---|
| | Report | Lizoń 50' |

Shamrock Park, Portadown
Referee: Ivana Vlaić (Bosnia and Herzegovina)

=== Group 5 ===
Hosted by Hungary.

| Team | Pld | W | D | L | GF | GA | GD | Pts |
|---|---|---|---|---|---|---|---|---|
| Scotland | 3 | 2 | 0 | 1 | 7 | 5 | +2 | 6 |
| Norway | 3 | 2 | 0 | 1 | 13 | 4 | +9 | 6 |
| Finland | 3 | 1 | 0 | 2 | 4 | 7 | −3 | 3 |
| Hungary | 3 | 1 | 0 | 2 | 5 | 13 | −8 | 3 |

2 October 2013
14:00

| Norway | 5–1 | Finland |
|---|---|---|
| Miettinen 5' (o.g.); Lund 33' (pen.); Haugland 39'; Fjelldal 50'; Jørgensen 69' | Report | Kauppi 57' |

Bük, Bük
Referee: Vivian Peeters (Netherlands)
2 October 2013
14:00

| Hungary | 4–3 | Scotland |
|---|---|---|
| Kaján 31', 35', 61'; Szakonyi 47' | Report | Robertson 12'; Rafferty 22'; Walker 40+1' |

Városi, Sopron
Referee: Dilek Koçbay (Turkey)

4 October 2013
14:00

| Norway | 1–2 | Scotland |
|---|---|---|
| Lund 34' | Report | Whyte 54'; Walker 69' |

Bük, Bük
Referee: Dilek Koçbay (Turkey)
4 October 2013
14:00

| Finland | 3–0 | Hungary |
|---|---|---|
| Kuoksa 2'; Rantanen 20'; Kollanen 80+2' | Report |

Városi, Sopron
Referee: Iryna Petrova (Ukraine)

7 October 2013
14:00

| Hungary | 1–7 | Norway |
|---|---|---|
| Szabó 70' | Report | N. Hanssen 13', 52'; Fjelldal 22', 80+1'; Haugland 41', 71'; Lund 64' |

Városi, Sopron
Referee: Vivian Peeters (Netherlands)
7 October 2013
14:00

| Scotland | 2–0 | Finland |
|---|---|---|
| Cuthbert 33' (pen.); Walker 52' | Report |

Bük, Bük
Referee: Iryna Petrova (Ukraine)

=== Group 6 ===
Hosted by Germany.

| Team | Pld | W | D | L | GF | GA | GD | Pts |
|---|---|---|---|---|---|---|---|---|
| Germany | 3 | 2 | 1 | 0 | 7 | 0 | +7 | 7 |
| Belgium | 3 | 1 | 1 | 1 | 2 | 2 | 0 | 4 |
| Netherlands | 3 | 1 | 1 | 1 | 3 | 2 | +1 | 4 |
| Switzerland | 3 | 0 | 1 | 2 | 2 | 10 | −8 | 1 |

11 October 2013
16:00

| Belgium | 1–0 | Netherlands |
|---|---|---|
| Wal 23' (o.g.) | Report |

Willy Sachs, Schweinfurt
Referee: Ana Jovanović (Serbia)
11 October 2013
19:00

| Germany | 6–0 | Switzerland |
|---|---|---|
| Walkling 17' (pen.), 40+2', 55'; Sehan 18', 66'; Meier 69' | Report |

Willy Sachs, Schweinfurt
Referee: Irina Tereshchenko (Russia)

13 October 2013
13:00

| Switzerland | 1–1 | Belgium |
|---|---|---|
| Lucchini 74' | Report | De Smet 58' |

Fuchs-Park-Stadion, Bamberg
Referee: Marianne Svendsen (Denmark)
13 October 2013
16:00

| Germany | 0–0 | Netherlands |
|---|---|---|
| | Report |

Fuchs-Park-Stadion, Bamberg
Referee: Ana Jovanović (Serbia)

16 October 2013
11:00

| Belgium | 0–1 | Germany |
|---|---|---|
| | Report | Sehan 70' |

Bioenergie-Arena, Großbardorf
Referee: Irina Tereshchenko (Russia)
16 October 2013
11:00

| Netherlands | 3–1 | Switzerland |
|---|---|---|
| Van Gurp 51'; Sanders 53'; Folkertsma 57' | Report | Stierli 48' |

Willy Sachs, Schweinfurt
Referee: Marianne Svendsen (Denmark)

=== Ranking of second-placed teams ===
To determine the best runners-up from the elite round, only the results against the top two teams in each group were taken into account.

The following criteria are applied to determine the rankings:

1. higher number of points obtained in these matches
2. superior goal difference from these matches
3. higher number of goals scored in these matches
4. fair play conduct of the teams in all group matches in the elite round
5. drawing of lots

| Grp | Team | Pld | W | D | L | GF | GA | GD | Pts |
|---|---|---|---|---|---|---|---|---|---|
| 3 | Portugal | 2 | 1 | 1 | 0 | 3 | 2 | +1 | 4 |
| 5 | Norway | 2 | 1 | 0 | 1 | 6 | 3 | +3 | 3 |
| 1 | Republic of Ireland | 2 | 1 | 0 | 1 | 3 | 3 | 0 | 3 |
| 6 | Belgium | 2 | 1 | 0 | 1 | 1 | 1 | 0 | 3 |
| 4 | Sweden | 2 | 0 | 1 | 1 | 2 | 3 | −1 | 1 |
| 2 | Greece | 2 | 0 | 1 | 1 | 2 | 3 | −1 | 1 |
