= Andorra women's national football team results =

Andorra women's team played its first friendly match in 2014 and its first official one in 2015. It is organised and headed by Andorran Football Federation.

This is a list of the Andorra women's national football team results.

== Results ==
=== 2014 ===
1 July 2014 UEFA Development Tournament	Gibraltar	0–1	Andorra	Gibraltar
		Report	López 61'	Stadium: Victoria Stadium

2 July 2014 UEFA Development Tournament	Andorra	0–4	Luxembourg	Gibraltar
		Report	Thompson; Estevez; Birkel; Maurer	Stadium: Victoria Stadium

=== 2015 ===
4 April UEFA Women's Euro 2017 qualifying	Andorra	3–5	Malta	Ħamrun, Malta
14:15	López 3'; Gonçalves 57'; Fernández 90+3'		Cuschieri 5', 21'; Theuma 24', 51'; Carabott 45+2'	Stadium: Victor Tedesco Stadium; Referee: Paula Brady (Republic of Ireland)

6 April UEFA Women's Euro 2017 qualifying	Faroe Islands	8–0	Andorra	Ħamrun, Malta
11:00	Andreasen 20' (pen.), 45+1', 83' (pen.), 90+2'; H. Sevdal 49', 62'; F. Danielsen 69'; Arge 90+3'			Stadium: Victor Tedesco Stadium; Referee: Paula Brady (Republic of Ireland)

9 April UEFA Women's Euro 2017 qualifying	Andorra	0–7	Georgia	Ta' Qali, Malta
14:15			Matveeva 3', 6'; Chichinadze 25'; Tchkonia 26', 69' (pen.), 83', 85'	Stadium: Ta' Qali National Stadium; Referee: Yuliya Medvedeva-Keldyusheva (Kazakhstan)

=== 2016 ===
22 November Friendly	Malta	3–0	Andorra	Ta' Qali, Malta
18:00				Stadium: Ta' Qali National Stadium

24 November Friendly	Malta	4–0	Andorra	Ta' Qali, Malta
14:00				Stadium: Ta' Qali National Stadium

=== 2017 ===
6 April 2019 FIFA Women's World Cup qualification	Moldova	4–0	Andorra	Vilnius, Lithuania
13:00	Chiper 9'; Cerescu 41'; Munteanu 45' (pen.); Colesnicenco 71'	Report		Stadium: LFF Stadium; Referee: Marte Sørø (Norway)

8 April 2019 FIFA Women's World Cup qualification	Israel	7–0	Andorra	Vilnius, Lithuania
17:30	Shahaf 15', 37'; Tizón 29' (o.g.); Rogers 34'; O. Sofer 45+1' (pen.); D. Sofer 47'; Sendel 62' (pen.)	Report		Stadium: LFF Stadium; Referee: Barbara Poxhofer (Austria)

11 April 2019 FIFA Women's World Cup qualification	Andorra	0–2	Lithuania	Kaunas, Lithuania
14:00			Kyžaitė 49'; Vaičiulaitytė 90+2'	Stadium: National Football Academy Stadium; Referee: Barbara Poxhofer (Austria)

=== 2019 ===
24 June Friendly	Luxembourg	2–1	Andorra	Bettembourg, Luxembourg
19:00	Silva 22'; Delgado 62'	Report FAF; Report FLF	Tizón 60'	Stadium: Stade Municipal; Referee: Viki de Cremer (Belgium)

=== 2021 ===
18 September Friendly	Liechtenstein	2–4	Andorra	Triesen, Liechtenstein
	Vogt 41'; Müssner 68'	Report (LFV)	Morató 6', 26' (pen.), 36'; Gonçalves 60'	Stadium: Sportanlage Blumenau; Attendance: 150; Referee: Michèle Schmölzer Switzerland

=== 2022 ===
16 February Friendly	Andorra	4–1	Gibraltar	Andorra la Vella, Andorra
15:00 (CET)	Morató 13', 17'; Ruzafa 26'; Fernández 38'	Report	Gilbert 45'	Stadium: Estadi Nacional

22 February Friendly	Tahiti	0–0	Andorra	Schiltigheim, France
19:00				Stadium: Stade de l'Aar

25 June Friendly	Faroe Islands	3–1	Andorra	Faroe Islands
16:00			Carrançà

28 June Friendly	Faroe Islands	1–0	Andorra	Faroe Islands

3 September Friendly	Andorra	3–1	Liechtenstein	Andorra la Vella, Andorra
	Fernández 53'; Tizón 79'; Ruzafa 90+2' (pen.)	Report	Fasel 31'	Stadium: Center FAF

=== 2023 ===
13 June Friendly	Andorra	3–1	Saudi Arabia	Peralada, Spain
	Gonçalves 6'; Ruzafa 19'; Morató 45'		Ibrahim 25'	Stadium: Municipal

17 June Friendly	Andorra	3–0	Saudi Arabia	Peralada, Spain
	Morató 21', 72'; Ruzafa 90'			Stadium: Municipal

22 September 2023–24 UEFA Women's Nations League C	Moldova	1–2	Andorra	Orhei, Moldova
17:00	Topal 17'	Report	Muelas 28'; Del Barco 77'	Stadium: CSR Orhei; Referee: Marina Zechner (Austria)

26 September 2023–24 UEFA Women's Nations League C	Andorra	0–4	Latvia	Andorra la Vella, Andorra
18:00 UTC+2	Miksone 15', 26', 45+4'; Zaičikova 36'	Report		Stadium: Estadi Nacional; Referee: Nanna Løf Andersen (Denmark)

27 October 2023–24 UEFA Women's Nations League C	Malta	5–0	Andorra	Ta' Qali, Malta
20:00	Bugeja 17', 46'; Farrugia 23'; Farrugia 74'; Cuschieri 77'	Report		Stadium: Ta' Qali National Stadium

31 October 2023–24 UEFA Women's Nations League C	Andorra	0–3	Malta	Andorra la Vella, Andorra
19:00		Report	Bugeja 36', 40', 43' (pen.)	Stadium: Estadi Nacional; Attendance: 603; Referee: Sofik Torosyan (Armenia)

1 December 2023–24 UEFA Women's Nations League C	Latvia	4–0	Andorra	Riga, Latvia
12:00 (13:00 EET)	Ševcova 42', 45', 47'; Poļuhoviča 68'	Report		Stadium: LNK Sporta Parks; Attendance: 69; Referee: Silvia Gasperotti (Italy)

15 December 2023–24 UEFA Women's Nations League C	Andorra	0–0	Moldova	Andorra la Vella, Andorra
16:00		Report		Stadium: Estadi Nacional; Referee: Ioanna Allayiotou (Cyprus)

=== 2024 ===
5 April UEFA Women's Euro 2025 qualifying	Montenegro	6–1	Andorra	Podgorica, Montenegro
				Stadium: Podgorica City Stadium; Attendance: 250; Referee: Farida Lutfaliyeva (Azerbaijan)

9 April UEFA Women's Euro 2025 qualifying	Andorra	0–3	Greece	Andorra la Vella, Andorra
				Stadium: Estadi Nacional; Attendance: 428; Referee: Jurgita Mačikunytė (Lithuania)

31 May UEFA Women's Euro 2025 qualifying	Faroe Islands	4–0	Andorra	Tórshavn, Faroe Islands
				Stadium: Tórsvøllur; Attendance: 507; Referee: Marisca Overtoom (Netherlands)

4 June UEFA Women's Euro 2025 qualifying	Andorra	1–5	Montenegro	Andorra la Vella, Andorra
				Stadium: Estadi Nacional; Attendance: 376; Referee: Joanna Vassallo (Malta)

12 July Euro 2025 qualifying	Greece	6–0	Andorra	Heraklion
		Report		Stadium: Theodoros Vardinogiannis Stadium; Attendance: 725

16 July Euro 2025 qualifying	Andorra	0–4	Faroe Islands	Andorra la Vella
19:00		Report		Stadium: Estadi Nacional; Attendance: 426

23 October International friendly	Gibraltar	1–4	Andorra	Europa Point, Gibraltar
13:00	Viagas 78'		Morató 7', 43'; Ruzafa 45+1'; Plaja 85'	Stadium: Europa Point Stadium

26 October International friendly	Gibraltar	2–4	Andorra	Europa Point, Gibraltar
11:00	J. Gilbert 40'; Viagas 60'		Morató 8'; Ruzafa 21'; Colobrans 56'; Fernández 86'	Stadium: Europa Point Stadium

=== 2025 ===
21 February 2025 UEFA Women's Nations League	Georgia	2–1	Andorra	Tbilisi
16:00	Bebia 84' (pen.); Bakradze 87'	Report	Solé Palau 69'	Stadium: Mikheil Meskhi Stadium; Attendance: 850; Referee: Ugne Šmitaite (Lithuania)

25 February 2025 UEFA Women's Nations League	Malta	1–0	Andorra	Ta' Qali
19:30	Zammit 11'	Report		Stadium: Centenary Stadium; Attendance: 612; Referee: Teresa Oliveira (Portugal)

4 April 2025 UEFA Women's Nations League	Cyprus	2–2	Andorra	Achnas, Cyprus
18:00 (19:00 EEST)	Violari 11'; Michail 72'	Report	Morató 7', 83'	Stadium: Dasaki Stadium; Attendance: 180; Referee: Eszter Urban (Hungary)

8 April 2025 UEFA Women's Nations League	Andorra	2–1	Cyprus	Andorra la Vella, Andorra
20:00	Morató 84', 90+2' (pen.)	Report	Aristodimou 30'	Stadium: Estadi Nacional; Attendance: 407; Referee: Araksya Saribekyan (Armenia)

30 May 2025 UEFA Women's Nations League	Andorra	1–2	Georgia	Encamp
19:00	Ber 17'	Report	Ambalia 12'; Mtskerashvili 28'	Stadium: Estadi de la FAF; Attendance: 513; Referee: Vesna Miletić (Bosnia and Herzegovina)

3 June 2025 UEFA Women's Nations League	Andorra	0–0	Malta	Encamp
19:00		Report		Stadium: Estadi de la FAF; Attendance: 470; Referee: Satu Miettunen (Finland)

22 October International friendly	Andorra	2–0	Gibraltar	Andorra la Vella, Andorra
16:00	Morató 89'; Ruzafa 90+8'			Stadium: Estadi Nacional

25 October International friendly	Andorra	3–1	Gibraltar	Encamp, Andorra
	Morató 11', 56', 82' (pen.)		Lawrence 22'	Stadium: Estadi de la FAF

=== 2026 ===
3 March 2027 FIFA Women's World Cup qualification	Andorra	0–0	Hungary	Andorra la Vella, Andorra
19:00		Report		Stadium: Estadi Nacional; Attendance: 330; Referee: Roxana Recorean (Romania)

7 March 2027 FIFA Women's World Cup qualification	North Macedonia	3–0	Andorra	Bitola, North Macedonia
15:00	Galabovska 17'; Meijer 20'; Grozdanova 83'	Report		Stadium: Petar Miloševski Stadium; Attendance: 650; Referee: Charlotte Carpenter (Wales)

14 April 2027 FIFA Women's World Cup qualification	Andorra	1–3	Azerbaijan	Andorra la Vella, Andorra
19:00	Morató 12'	Report	Jafarzade 15', 50' (pen.); Manya 90+5'	Stadium: Estadi Nacional; Attendance: 353; Referee: Kristina Kozoroh (Ukraine)

18 April 2027 FIFA Women's World Cup qualification	Azerbaijan	v	Andorra	Absheron, Azerbaijan
		Report		Stadium: Bank Respublika Arena

5 June 2027 FIFA Women's World Cup qualification	Andorra	v	North Macedonia	Andorra
		Report

9 June 2027 FIFA Women's World Cup qualification	Hungary	v	Andorra	Hungary
		Report
