= UEFA Women's Euro 2017 qualifying preliminary round =

The preliminary round of the UEFA Women's Euro 2017 qualifying competition involved the eight lowest-ranked teams among the 46 qualifying entrants: Andorra, Faroe Islands, Georgia, Latvia, Lithuania, Luxembourg, Malta and Moldova. The draw for the preliminary round, where the eight teams were drawn into two groups of four teams, was held on 19 January 2015.

Each group was played in single round-robin format at the pre-selected hosts. The two group winners advanced to the qualifying group stage.

All times were CEST (UTC+2).

== Group 1 ==
Pos	Team	Pld	W	D	L	GF	GA	GD	Pts	Qualification	Moldova	Latvia	Lithuania	Luxembourg
1	Moldova (H)	3	2	0	1	5	1	+4	6	Qualifying group stage	—	0–1	2–0	—
2	Latvia	3	1	1	1	5	5	0	4		—	—	1–1	—
3	Lithuania	3	1	1	1	3	3	0	4		—	—	—	2–0
4	Luxembourg	3	1	0	2	4	8	−4	3		0–3	4–3	—	—

Source: UEFA
Rules for classification: Qualification tiebreakers
(H) Hosts
4 April 2015
11:00

Luxembourg	4–3	Latvia
Bidermane 44' (o.g.); Birkel 60'; Thompson 69', 90+5'	Report	Voitāne 17'; Fedotova 57'; Vāciete 72'

CSR Orhei, Orhei
Attendance: 35
Referee: Simona Ghisletta (Switzerland)
4 April 2015
15:00

Moldova	2–0	Lithuania
Chiper 68'; Porojniuc 85'	Report

Stadionul CPSM, Vadul lui Vodă
Attendance: 400
Referee: Sabine Bonnin (France)

6 April 2015
11:00

Lithuania	2–0	Luxembourg
Vanagaitė 16'; Imanalijeva 86'	Report

CSR Orhei, Orhei
Attendance: 41
Referee: Simona Ghisletta (Switzerland)
6 April 2015
15:00

Moldova	0–1	Latvia
	Report	Vāciete 26'

Stadionul CPSM, Vadul lui Vodă
Attendance: 250
Referee: Gordana Kuzmanović (Serbia)

9 April 2015
14:00

Luxembourg	0–3	Moldova
	Report	Chiper 13', 86'; Andone 87'

Stadionul CPSM, Vadul lui Vodă
Attendance: 200
Referee: Sabine Bonnin (France)
9 April 2015
14:00

Latvia	1–1	Lithuania
Vāciete 70'	Report	Imanalijeva 38'

CSR Orhei, Orhei
Attendance: 60
Referee: Gordana Kuzmanović (Serbia)

== Group 2 ==
Pos	Team	Pld	W	D	L	GF	GA	GD	Pts	Qualification	Georgia	Faroe Islands	Malta	Andorra
1	Georgia	3	2	0	1	10	2	+8	6 (Note: Ranked by head-to-head record (Georgia: 3 pts, +1 GD; Faroe Islands: 3 pts, 0 GD; Malta: 3 pts, −1 GD).)	Qualifying group stage	—	2–0	1–2	—
2	Faroe Islands	3	2	0	1	12	4	+8	6		—	—	—	8–0
3	Malta (H)	3	2	0	1	9	8	+1	6		—	2–4	—	—
4	Andorra	3	0	0	3	3	20	−17	0		0–7	—	3–5	—

Source: UEFA
Rules for classification: Qualification tiebreakers
(H) Hosts
Notes:
4 April 2015
11:00

Georgia	2–0	Faroe Islands
Matveeva 22'; Chichinadze 89'	Report

Victor Tedesco Stadium, Ħamrun
Attendance: 30
Referee: Yuliya Medvedeva-Keldyusheva (Kazakhstan)
4 April 2015
14:15

Andorra	3–5	Malta
López 3'; Gonçalves 57'; Fernández 90+3'	Report	Cuschieri 5', 21'; Theuma 24', 51'; Carabott 45+2'

Victor Tedesco Stadium, Ħamrun
Attendance: 210
Referee: Paula Brady (Republic of Ireland)

6 April 2015
11:00

Faroe Islands	8–0	Andorra
Andreasen 20' (pen.), 45+1', 83' (pen.), 90+2'; H. Sevdal 49', 62'; F. Danielsen 69'; Arge 90+3'	Report

Victor Tedesco Stadium, Ħamrun
Attendance: 20
Referee: Paula Brady (Republic of Ireland)
6 April 2015
14:15

Georgia	1–2	Malta
Chichinadze 55' (pen.)	Report	Carabott 47'; Theuma 90'

Victor Tedesco Stadium, Ħamrun
Attendance: 210
Referee: Dilan Gökçek (Turkey)

9 April 2015
11:00

Malta	2–4	Faroe Islands
Carabott 39'; M. Borg 49'	Report	Andreasen 13'; Simonsen 15'; H. Sevdal 53', 90'

Victor Tedesco Stadium, Ħamrun
Attendance: 340
Referee: Dilan Gökçek (Turkey)
9 April 2015
11:00

Andorra	0–7	Georgia
	Report	Matveeva 3', 6'; Chichinadze 25'; Tchkonia 26', 69' (pen.), 83', 85'

Ta' Qali National Stadium, Ta' Qali
Attendance: 35
Referee: Yuliya Medvedeva-Keldyusheva (Kazakhstan)

== Goalscorers ==
5 goals

- (Faroe Islands) Rannvá Andreasen

4 goals

- (Faroe Islands) Heidi Sevdal
- (Georgia (country)) Khatia Tchkonia

3 goals

- (Georgia (country)) Lela Chichinadze
- (Georgia (country)) Tatiana Matveeva
- (Latvia) Liene Vāciete
- (Malta) Ylenia Carabott
- (Malta) Dorianne Theuma
- (Moldova) Claudia Chiper

2 goals

- (Lithuania) Rasa Imanalijeva
- (Luxembourg) Amy Thompson
- (Malta) Rachel Cuschieri

1 goal

- (Andorra) Marina Fernández
- (Andorra) Bibiana Gonçalves
- (Andorra) Alba López
- (Faroe Islands) Lív Arge
- (Faroe Islands) Fríðrún Danielsen
- (Faroe Islands) Milja Simonsen
- (Latvia) Renāte Fedotova
- (Latvia) Sandra Voitāne
- (Lithuania) Sonata Vanagaitė
- (Luxembourg) Jessica Birkel
- (Malta) Martina Borg
- (Moldova) Ludmila Andone
- (Moldova) Elena Porojniuc

1 own goal

- (Latvia) Ieva Bidermane (playing against Luxembourg)
