= List of Andorra women's international footballers =

This is a non-exhaustive list of Andorra women's international footballers – association football players who have appeared at least once for the senior Andorra women's national football team.

== Players ==
Key
**Bold**	Named to the national team in the past year

Name	Caps	Goals	National team years	Club(s)	Ref.
Ainhoa Fernández	2	0			
**Marina Fernández**	6	1		(Andorra) ENFAF	
Margot Llobera	3	0			
**Maria Moles**	1	0	2021–	(Spain) Levante Las Planas Juvenil A	
**Teresa Morató**	3	0		(Spain) Villarreal	
**Maria Ruzafa**	5	0		(Spain) Águilas	

== See also ==
- Andorra women's national football team
