= Renlund =

Renlund is a surname. Notable people with the surname include:

- Dale G. Renlund (born 1952), American cardiologist and leader in the Church of Jesus Christ of Latter-day Saints
- Liza Renlund (born 1997), Swedish footballer
