= Dilek Koçbay =

Turkish football referee

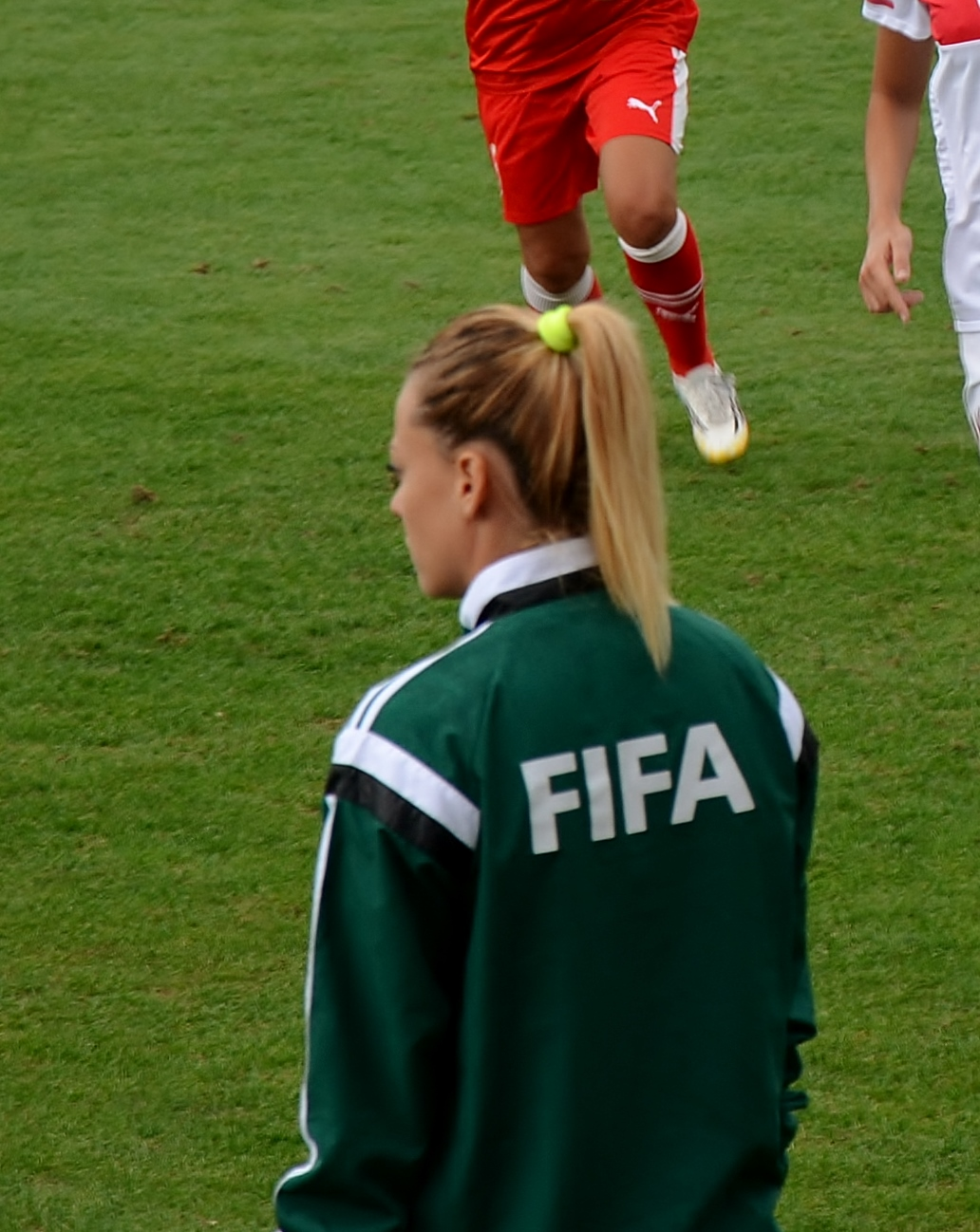
- Dilek Koçbay acting as fourth official at the 2015 FIFA Women's World Cup qualification – UEFA Group 6 match Turkey vs Belarus.
- Born: December 30, 1982 (age 43); Balıkesir, Turkey
- Other occupation: Teacher

Domestic
Years	League	Role
2010–2012	A2	referee
2012–2014	Regional Amateur	referee
2012–2014	TFF Third	fourth official

International
Years	League	Role
2013	UEFA Women's Under-17 Championship	referee

Dilek Koçbay (born Dilek Özdemir on December 30, 1982), is a Turkish FIFA listed football referee. She is a teacher of physical education by profession.

== Personal life ==
She was born in Balıkesir on December 30, 1982. Her father Mehmet Özdemir was a football referee, who inspired her for her later career as referee. She studied physical education and sports in Balıkesir University, becoming a teacher after graduation. She is married to Zafer Koçbay, a former football referee. They live in Çanakkale.

During her school years, she played volleyball. At the age of 17, she assisted with her sister their father in a football match as referee. And one year later, she assisted her later husband in a match.

== Sports career ==
=== Referee ===
Koçbay began her referee career officially as an assistant referee in a match of the TFF Third League on October 20, 2007.

She made her debut as a referee in the PAF League, the predecessor of A2 League, on February 17, 2007. She officiated a youth super league, (Turkish: Deplasmanlı Süper Gençler Ligi, DSGL), match for the first time on March 8, 2008. She was promoted to officiate Turkish men's reserve team league, called A2 Ligi, matches on September 20, 2010. Then on November 4, 2012, Koçbay served for the first time as referee in the Regional Amateur League.

In September 2012, she officiated the friendly match between Turkey women's national U-19 and Wales teams held in Turkey. Koçbay served as referee at two of the 2014 UEFA Women's Under-17 Championship qualification – Group 5 matches in October 2013. She served as fourth official in the 2015 FIFA Women's World Cup qualification – UEFA Group 6 match of Turkey vs Belarus on September 17, 2014.
