= AO Rethymniaki Enosi Athliton =

Greek women's football club (e. 2022)

REA
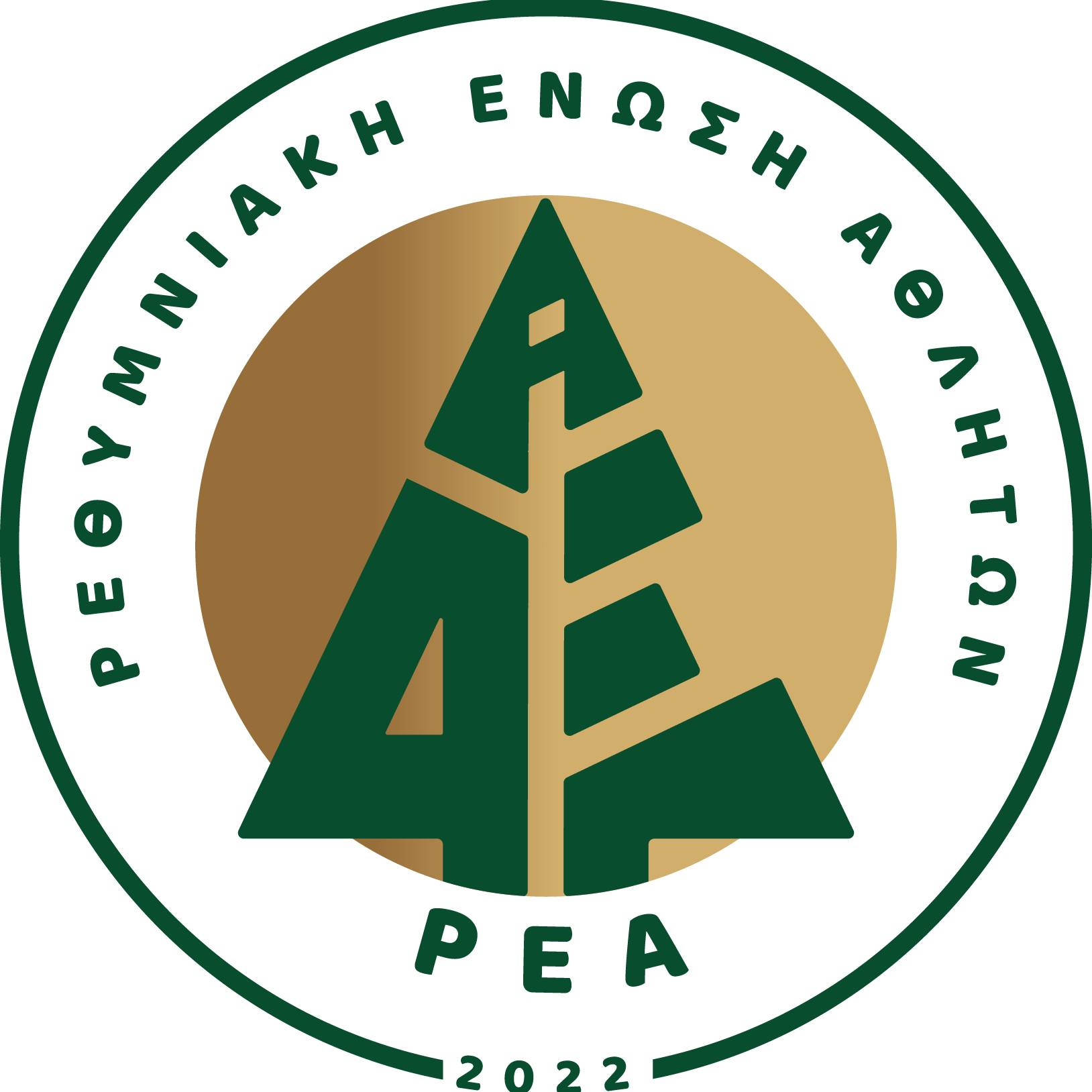
- Full name: Athletic Club Rethymniaki Enosi Athliton
- Short name: REA
- Founded: 9 July 2022; 4 years ago
- Ground: Sochora Municipal Stadium
- Chairman: Iraklis Manoukarakis
- Manager: Gianna Douka
- League: Greek A Division
- 2025–26: A Division, 6th
- Website: http://reafc.gr/

AO Rethymniaki Enosi Athliton (Greek: Α.Ο. Ρεθυμνιακή Ένωση Αθλητών), or simply REA, is a Greek women's association football club that competes in the Greek A Division. It was established in 2022 when the women's team of Neos Asteras Rethymno broke away from the Crete-based club and was rebranded as REA.

== History ==
Asteras Ladies was created in 2015 and represented Asteras Rethymno in the Greek C Division. They were promoted to the first division in 2020, where they competed for two seasons, finishing 8th in 2020/21 and 4th in 2021/22 in the second group.

In the summer of 2022, they broke away and changed the club's name, colors and badge. The new name, REA, refers to Rhea, the mother goddess in Greek mythology, but it also stands for Rethymniaki Enosi Athliton (lit. 'Athletes' Union of Rethymno').

The team consisted of the former Asteras players as well as new signings like Marina Koutri and Miljana Smiljkovic from PAOK, Viverly Erazo from Millonarios and Greek international defender Stela Kotsaki from Doxa 2016.

In 2022/23, during the regular season, they finished 3rd in the second group with 9 wins, 2 draws and 3 losses. They qualified for the play-offs round in which they won 4 out of 6 matches, finishing 3rd behind PAOK and Ergotelis. Gisela Arrieta was the top goalscorer of the club with 16 goals.

In 2023/24, they finished 5th with 12 wins, 8 draws and 6 losses. Tânia Mateus was the top goalscorrer of the club with 15 goals. Manager Nikos Kyriakopoulos parted ways with the club on 21 December 2023 and was replaced by former professional footballer and men's football manager Stelios Kozanidis. Kozanidis renewed his contract at the end of the season.

== Colours and badge ==
The colors of REA are gold, which symbolizes brightness and knowledge, and green, which represents the beginning of a new journey.

The club crest includes a tree with the Sun in the background. The Sun signifies the transmission of light, of life-giving energy and shows the unlimited potential for growth. The Tree is one of the symbols of the goddess Rhea, while also being the most sacred symbol of growth and the ultimate symbolism of man's path and purpose. The Tree is formed by the letters of the acronym REA.

== Current squad ==
As of 8 November 2026

Note: Flags indicate national team as defined under FIFA eligibility rules; some limited exceptions apply. Players may hold more than one non-FIFA nationality.

| No. | Pos. | Nation | Player |
|---|---|---|---|
| 1 | GK | GRE | Eirini Manoukaraki (vice-captain) |
| 2 | MF | GRE | Stela Kotsaki (4th captain) |
| 3 | DF | GRE | Kalioppi Vorria (5th captain) |
| 4 | DF | JPN | Nanako Kobayashi |
| 5 | DF | GRE | Glykeria Nikopoulou |
| 6 | DF | GRE | Rania Tougli |
| 7 | MF | ESP | Yolanda Bonnín |
| 9 | FW | AND | Maria Ruzafa |
| 10 | MF | USA | Avery Klingensmith |
| 11 | FW | USA | Lindsey Chau |
| 12 | MF | GRE | Eleni Tsiledaki |

| No. | Pos. | Nation | Player |
|---|---|---|---|
| 13 | DF | GRE | Dimitra Markoutsa (3rd captain) |
| 14 | DF | GRE | Marianna Theodosoulaki |
| 15 | GK | GRE | Georgia Balasi |
| 17 | FW | KEN | Topister Situma |
| 18 | DF | GRE | Aggeliki Panteri |
| 19 | DF | GRE | Maria Kelaidi (captain) |
| 20 | FW | GRE | Despoina Pantalaki |
| 21 | FW | GRE | Eleftheria Plakia |
| 22 | MF | GRE | Myrto Axiarli |
| 24 | FW | USA | Maddy Murphy |
| 28 | GK | GRE | Anastasia Orfanoudaki |

== Coaching staff ==
As of 21 October 2026

| Position | Name | Ref. |
|---|---|---|
| Head coach | (Greece) Gianna Douka | |
| Technical director | (Greece) Antonis Platis | |
| Goalkeeping coach | (Greece) Antonis Platis | |
| Analyst | (Greece) Antonis Platis | |
| Fitness coach | (Greece) Andreas Drygiannakis | |
| Team Manager | (Greece) Eirini Drakaki | |

== Season to season ==
| Season | League | | | | | | | | | Cup | UWCL | Top scorer | |
| Season | Div | Pos | Pld | W | D | L | GF | GA | Pts | Cup | UWCL | Name(s) | Goal |
|---|---|---|---|---|---|---|---|---|---|---|---|---|---|
As Neos Asteras Rethymnou
| 2015–16 | C | 4th (Gr:VII) | 10 | 2 | 4 | 4 | 12 | 24 | 10 | — | — | | |
| 2016–17 | C | 2nd (Gr:VIII) | 8 | 6 | 1 | 1 | 35 | 13 | 19 | — | — | (Greece) Maria Nikiforou | 7 |
| 2017–18 | C | 1th (Gr:VIII) | 8 | 6 | 1 | 1 | 27 | 11 | 19 | | — | (Greece) Eleftheria Dafermou (Greece) Zoi Drakaki | 6 |
| 2018–19 | B | 2nd (Gr:IV) | 14 | | | | 34 | 15 | 28 | | — | (Greece) Evi Touna | 12 |
| 2019–20 | B | 2nd (Gr:III) | 14 | | | | | | | | — | (Greece) Evi Touna | 14 |
| 2020–21 | A | 8th (Gr:II) | 10 | 3 | 2 | 5 | 14 | 21 | 11 | | — | (Greece) Christianna Manolitsi | 3 |
| 2021–22 | A | 4th (Gr:II) | 16 | 8 | 3 | 5 | 28 | 18 | 27 | | — | (Colombia) Gisela Betancourt | 10 |
As REA
| 2022–23 | A | 3rd | 20 | 13 | 2 | 5 | 60 | 21 | 41 | | — | (Colombia) Gisela Betancourt | 16 |
| 2023–24 | A | 5th | 26 | 12 | 8 | 6 | 54 | 23 | 44 | — | — | (Portugal) Tânia Mateus | 15 |
| 2024–25 | A | 6th | 22 | 7 | 6 | 9 | 33 | 28 | 27 | Semifinals | — | (Kenya) Topister Situma | 7 |
| 2025–26 | A | 6th | 26 | 14 | 5 | 7 | 53 | 23 | 47 | Quarterfinals | — | (Argentina) Anela Nigito (Kenya) Topister Situma (Andorra) Maria Ruzafa | 9 |
