= Tânia Mateus =

Portuguese footballer (born 1998)

Personal information
- Full name: Tânia Rita Pontes Mateus
- Date of birth: 6 August 1998 (age 28)
- Place of birth: Portugal
- Height: 1.65 m (5 ft 5 in)
- Position: Forward

Team information
- Current team: Beşiktaş J.K.
- Number: 7

Youth career
- Real Madrid
- 2012–2015: Marítimo (F7)
- 2015–2017: Apel (F9) (futsal)

Senior career*
Years	Team	Apps	(Gls)
2017–2019	Apel (futsal)	12	(12)
2019–2023	Marítimo	91	(13)
2023–2024	REA	26	(15)
2024–2025	Damaiense	18	(4)
2025–	Beşiktaş	3	(1)

International career^{‡}
2015	Portugal U17	3	(3)
2015–2017	Portugal U19	5	(1)
2021	Portugal U23	2	(0)
- * Club domestic league appearances and goals as of 27 December 2025 ‡ National team caps and goals as of 19 February 2024

Tânia Rita Pontes Mateus (born 6 August 1998) is a Portuguese footballer and futsal player who plays as a forward for Turkish Super League club Beşiktaş.

== Club career ==
Tânia Mateus started playing football in the academy of Real Madrid and at the age of 15 she was chosen by the Portuguese side Marítimo, where she stayed for four years. She competed simultaneously in both the youth and senior teams, winning the regional championship several times. She then moved to the futsal club GD Apel for four years, which was competing in the Portuguese second division, before returning to Marítimo at the age of 21, making her professional debut in Portugal's 1st division, where she remained until 2023.

== International career ==
Tânia Mateus was part of the Portuguese U17 team that competed at the 2015 UEFA U17 Women's Development Tournament, in which she scored three goals in three matches. She also made five appearances for the U19 team, scoring one goal in a 3–1 defeat to Poland. She has participated in the 2016 UEFA Women's Under-19 Championship qualification.
