= Marina Fernández =

Marina Fernández may refer to:

- Marina Fernández (footballer)
- Marina Fernandez (actress)
- Marina Fernandez (gymnast)
- Marina Fernández de Córdoba, fourth Lady of Casarrubios del Monte in the province of Toledo
