= Claudia Chiper =

Moldovan footballer

Personal information
- Full name: Claudia Chiper
- Date of birth: 16 June 1995 (age 31)
- Place of birth: Moldova
- Position: Forward

Team information
- Current team: Rio Ave

Senior career*
| Years | Team | Apps | (Gls) |
| 2007–2011 | FC Roma Calfa | | |
| 2012–2018 | FC Noroc Nimoreni | 33 | (61) |
| 2016–2017 | Heniu Prundu Bârgăului | | |
| 2017 | Nea Salamis | | |
| 2017–2019 | Ammoschostou | 26 | (35) |
| 2018–2019 | Barcelona FA | 11 | (0) |
| 2019–2020 | Pyrgos Limassol | 15 | (9) |
| 2020 | Omonia Leikosias | 5 | (2) |
| 2020–2021 | Nea Salamis | 7 | (5) |
| 2021 | Heniu Prundu Bârgăului | 2 | (1) |
| 2021–2022 | Apulia Trani | 11 | (7) |
| 2022–2023 | Carmen București | 16 | (10) |
| 2023–2026 | Farul Constanța | 38 | (21) |
| 2026 | Rio Ave | | |

International career
| 2010–2012 | Moldova U17 | 6 | (1) |
| 2012–2014 | Moldova U19 | 9 | (1) |
| 2015– | Moldova | 55 | (6) |
- * Club domestic league appearances and goals

Claudia Chiper (born 16 June 1995) is a Moldovan footballer who plays as a forward for Rio Ave and the Moldova women's national team. Before being promoted to the senior team, she played for the under 17 and under 19 national teams.

== International goals ==
| No. | Date | Venue | Opponent | Score | Result | Competition |
|---|---|---|---|---|---|---|
| 1. | 4 April 2015 | Stadionul CPSM, Vadul lui Vodă, Moldova | Lithuania | 1–0 | 2–0 | UEFA Women's Euro 2017 qualifying preliminary round |
| 2. | 9 April 2015 | Stadionul CPSM, Vadul lui Vodă, Moldova | Luxembourg | 1–0 | 3–0 | UEFA Women's Euro 2017 qualifying preliminary round |
| 3. | 9 April 2015 | Stadionul CPSM, Vadul lui Vodă, Moldova | Luxembourg | 2–0 | 3–0 | UEFA Women's Euro 2017 qualifying preliminary round |
| 4. | 6 April 2017 | LFF Stadium, Vilnius, Lithuania | Andorra | 1–0 | 4–0 | 2019 FIFA Women's World Cup qualification preliminary round |
| 5. | 14 July 2023 | Stadionul CPSM, Vadul lui Vodă, Moldova | Montenegro | 1–0 | 2–1 | Friendly |
| 6. | 16 July 2024 | Daugava Stadium, Riga, Latvia | Latvia | 1–1 | 1–2 | UEFA Women's Euro 2025 qualifying |
| 7. | 3 June 2025 | Europa Sports Park, Europa Point, Gibraltar | Gibraltar | 1–0 | 4–0 | 2025 UEFA Women's Nations League |
| 8. | 3 June 2025 | Europa Sports Park, Europa Point, Gibraltar | Gibraltar | 2–0 | 4–0 | 2025 UEFA Women's Nations League |

== Career statistics ==
=== Club ===
| Club | Season | Division | League | | Cup | | Continental | | Total | |
| Club | Season | Division | Apps | Goals | Apps | Goals | Apps | Goals | Apps | Goals |
|---|---|---|---|---|---|---|---|---|---|---|
| Noroc Nimoreni | 2012-13 | Women Championship | 8 | 2 | | | 3 | 0 | 11 | 2 |
| Noroc Nimoreni | 2013-14 | Women Championship | 18 | 34 | 1 | 1 | | | 10 | 35 |
| Noroc Nimoreni | 2014-15 | Women Championship | 2 | 3 | | | | | 2 | 3 |
| Noroc Nimoreni | 2015-16 | Women Championship | 2 | 13 | 2 | 3 | 3 | 1 | 7 | 17 |
| Noroc Nimoreni | 2016-17 | Women Championship | 3 | 9 | 1 | 2 | | | 4 | 11 |
| Noroc Nimoreni | 2017-18 | Women Championship | | | | | 3 | 0 | 3 | 0 |
| Noroc Nimoreni | Total | | 33 | 61 | 4 | 6 | 9 | 1 | 46 | 68 |
| Heniu Prundu Bargaului | 2016-17 | Liga I Feminin | | | 1 | 2 | | | 1 | 2 |
| Heniu Prundu Bargaului | 2020-21 | Liga I Feminin | 2 | 1 | 1 | 0 | | | 3 | 1 |
| Heniu Prundu Bargaului | Total | | 2 | 1 | 2 | 2 | | | 4 | 3 |
| Ammoschostou | 2017-18 | Cyprus Women's Championship | 18 | 34 | | | | | 18 | 34 |
| Ammoschostou | 2018-19 | Cyprus Women's Championship | 8 | 1 | 2 | 0 | | | 10 | 1 |
| Ammoschostou | Total | | 26 | 35 | 2 | 0 | | | 28 | 35 |
| Barcelona FA | 2018-19 | Cyprus Women's Championship | 11 | 0 | | | | | 11 | 0 |
| Pirgeos Limassol | 2019-20 | Cyprus Women's Championship | 15 | 9 | 1 | 0 | | | 16 | 9 |
| Nea Salamis | 2020-21 | Cyprus Women's Championship | 7 | 5 | 1 | 0 | | | 8 | 5 |
| Omonia Leikosias | 2020-21 | Cyprus Women's Championship | 5 | 2 | 1 | 0 | | | 6 | 1 |
| Apulia Trani | 2021-22 | Serie C | 11 | 7 | | | | | 11 | 7 |
| Carmen Bucuresti | 2022-23 | Liga I Feminin | 16 | 10 | | | | | 16 | 10 |
| Farul Constanța | 2023-24 | Liga I Feminin | 12 | 7 | | | | | 12 | 7 |
| Farul Constanța | 2024-25 | Liga I Feminin | 13 | 5 | | | 2 | 0 | 15 | 5 |
| Farul Constanța | 2025-26 | Liga I Feminin | 12 | 9 | 1 | 0 | 4 | 0 | 17 | 9 |
| Farul Constanța | Total | | 38 | 21 | | | 6 | 0 | 44 | 21 |
| Total career | | | 164 | 151 | 11 | 8 | 15 | 1 | 190 | 160 |

== See also ==
- List of Moldova women's international footballers
