= Ashley Delgado Do Rosario =

Luxembourgish footballer

Personal information
- Date of birth: 18 August 2004 (age 22)
- Position: Midfielder

Senior career*
Years	Team	Apps	(Gls)
2018–2024	Young Boys Diekirch	98	(12)

International career^{‡}
2019–2023	Luxembourg	5	(1)
- * Club domestic league appearances and goals as of 8 June 2026 ‡ National team caps and goals as of 19 February 2023

Ashley Delgado Do Rosario (born 18 August 2004) is a Luxembourgish footballer who last played as a midfielder for Dames Ligue 1 club Young Boys Diekirch and the Luxembourg women's national team.

== International career ==
Delgado Do Rosario made her senior debut for Luxembourg on 21 June 2019 during a 2–1 friendly win against Andorra.

== Career statistics ==
#	Date	Venue	Opponent	Score	Result	Competition
1.	21 June 2019	Stade Municipal, Bettembourg, Luxembourg	Andorra	2–1	2–1	Friendly
