= Lela Chichinadze =

Georgian football striker

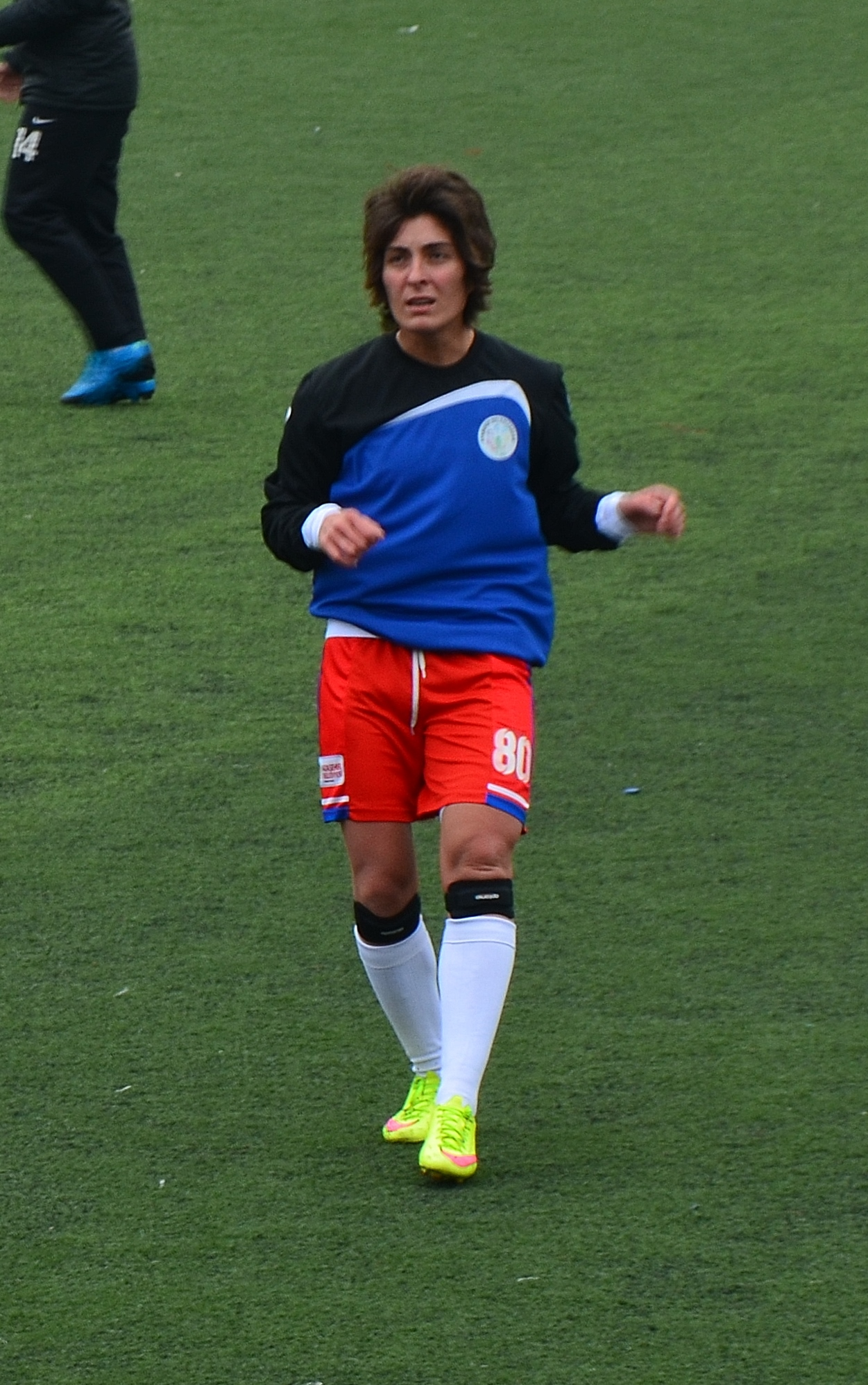
- Lela Chichinadze playing for Ataşehir Belediyespor (March 2016).

Personal information
- Full name: Lela Chichinadze
- Date of birth: December 22, 1988 (age 37)
- Place of birth: Soviet Union (now Georgia)
- Position: Striker

Senior career*
Years	Team	Apps	(Gls)
- Iveria Khashuri
- Norchi Dinamoeli
- Baia Zugdidi
2014–2016	Adana İdmanyurduspor	16	(23)
2016–2018	Ataşehir Belediyespor	20	(5)

International career^{‡}
2009–	Georgia	12	(3)
- * Club domestic league appearances and goals as of January 13, 2018 ‡ National team caps and goals as of April 9, 2013

Lela Chichinadze (Georgian: ლელა ჭიჭინაძე, also transliterated via French: Tchitchinadze, born December 22, 1988) is a Georgian football striker. She is a member of the Georgian national team. She played in the Turkish Women's First Football League for Ataşehir Belediyespor with jersey number 88.

== Playing career ==
=== Club ===
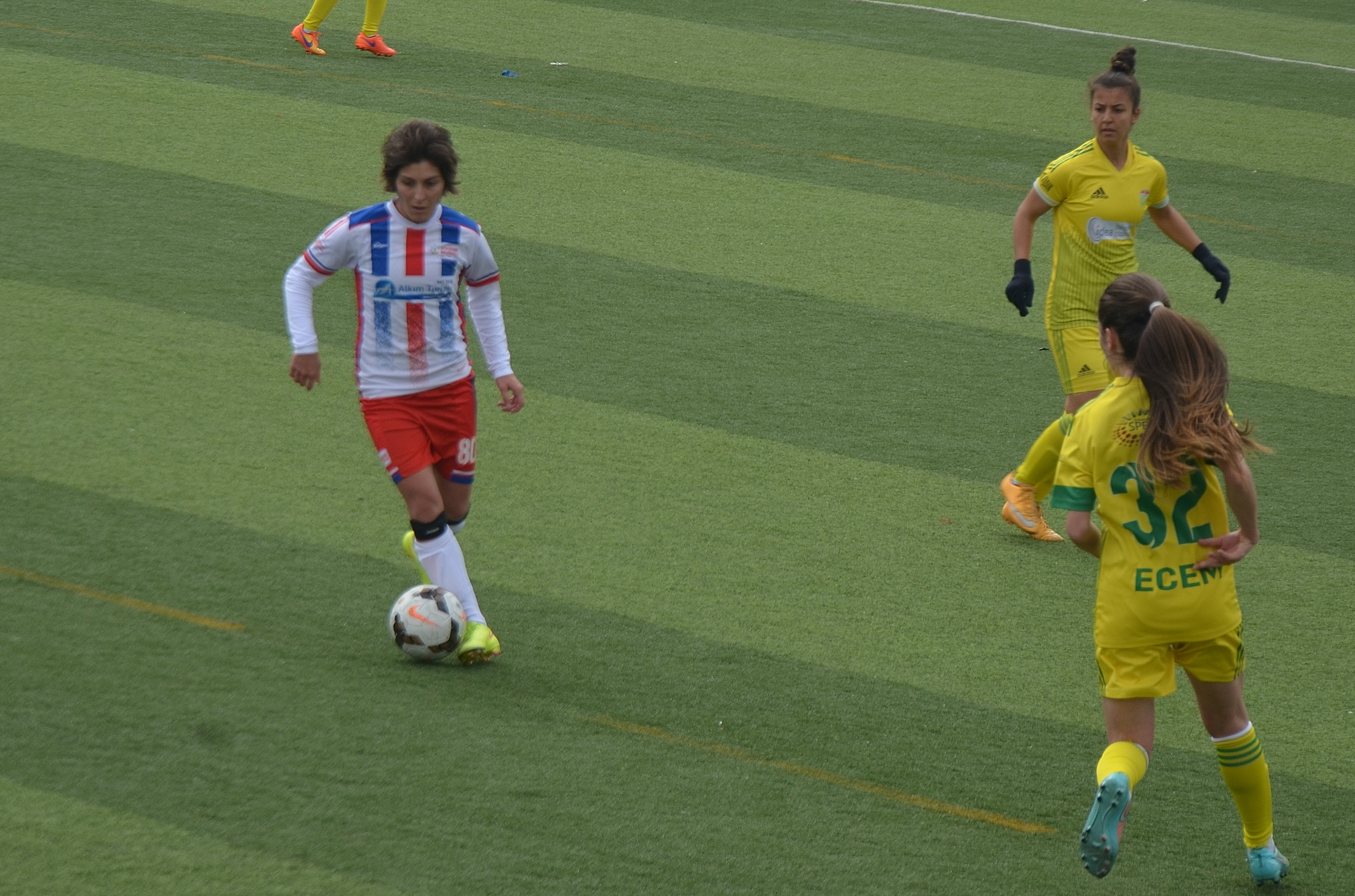
Lela Chichinadze (left) playing for Ataşehir Belediyespor in the 2015–16 season's home match against Kireçburnu Spor.

Chichinadze played the Champions League with Iveria Khashuri, Norchi Dinamoeli and Baia Zugdidi.

On January 30, 2015, Lela Chichinadze signed for the Turkish club Adana İdmanyurduspor. In her first game, she scored two goals for her new club. She transferred to the Istanbul-based club Ataşehir Belediyespor on February 5, 2016 .

=== International ===
She played in six of the 2011 FIFA Women's World Cup qualification – UEFA Group 3 matches, three of the UEFA Women's Euro 2013 qualifying – Group 2 games, and three of the 2015 FIFA Women's World Cup qualification (UEFA) – Group B matches. She scored in March 2011 the only goal in Georgia's first official win. Chichinadze scored three goals in total for the Georgian women's national team.

== Career statistics ==
As of January 13, 2018.

Club	Season	League			Continental		National		Total	
Club	Season	Division	Apps	Goals	Apps	Goals	Apps	Goals	Apps	Goals
Adana İdmanyurduspor	2014–15	First League	7	10	–	–			7	10
Adana İdmanyurduspor	2015–16	First League	9	13	–	–			9	13
Adana İdmanyurduspor	Total		16	23	–	–			16	23
Ataşehir Belediyespor	2015–16	First League	7	5	–	–			7	5
Ataşehir Belediyespor	2016–17	First League	5	0	–	–			5	0
Ataşehir Belediyespor	2017–18	First League	8	0	–	–	0	0	8	0
Ataşehir Belediyespor	Total		20	5	–	–			20	5

== Honours ==
Turkish Women's First League

Ataşehir Belediyespor
Runner-up (1): 2015–16
Third places (1): 2016–17

== International goals ==
Scores and results list Georgia's goal yally first.

No.	Date	Venue	Opponent	Score	Result	Competition
1.	27 March 2010	Mikheil Meskhi Stadium, Tbilisi, Georgia	Scotland	1–0	1–3	2011 FIFA Women's World Cup qualification
2.	9 April 2013	LFF Stadium, Vilnius, Lithuania	Faroe Islands	1–1	1–2	2015 FIFA Women's World Cup qualification
3.	8 March 2011	Ta'Qali National Stadium, Ta'Qali, Malta	Faroe Islands	1–0	1–0	UEFA Women's Euro 2013 qualifying
4.	24 February 2015	Rize Atatürk Stadium, Rize, Turkey	Turkey	1–0	2–4	Friendly
5.	4 April 2015	Victor Tedesco Stadium, Ħamrun, Malta	Faroe Islands	2–0	2–0	UEFA Women's Euro 2017 qualifying
6.	6 April 2015	Victor Tedesco Stadium, Ħamrun, Malta	Malta	1–1	1–2	UEFA Women's Euro 2017 qualifying
7.	9 April 2015	Ta'Qali National Stadium, Ta'Qali, Malta	Andorra	3–0	7–0	UEFA Women's Euro 2017 qualifying
8.	14 June 2019	Davit Petriashvili Stadium, Tbilisi, Georgia	United Arab Emirates	4–1	5–1	Friendly
9.	17 June 2019	Davit Petriashvili Stadium, Tbilisi, Georgia	United Arab Emirates	1–0	2–1	Friendly
10.	17 June 2019	Davit Petriashvili Stadium, Tbilisi, Georgia	United Arab Emirates	2–1	2–1	Friendly
