= Fríðrún Olsen =

Faroese footballer (born 1991)

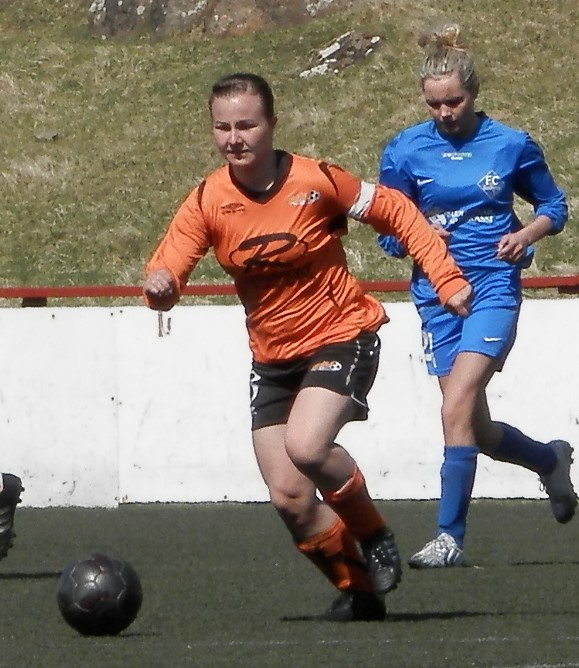
- Fríðrún Olsen in 2012.

Personal information
- Full name: Fríðrún Olsen
- Date of birth: April 29, 1991 (age 35)
- Place of birth: Faroe Islands
- Position: Midfielder

Team information
- Current team: EB/Streymur/Skála

Senior career*
Years	Team	Apps	(Gls)
2010	KÍ Klaksvík		
2010–	EB/Streymur/Skála	86	(54)

International career^{‡}
2011–	Faroe Islands	31	(2)
- * Club domestic league appearances and goals as of 08:31, 11 April 2015 (UTC) ‡ National team caps and goals as of 14 April 2017

Fríðrún Olsen (born Danielsen; 29 April 1991) is a Faroese football midfielder who currently plays for EB/Streymur/Skála.

== Honours ==
EB/Streymur/Skála

Runners-up

- 1. deild kvinnur (2): 2013, 2014

== International goals ==
Scores and results list Faroe Islands' goal tally first.

#	Date	Venue	Opponent	Score	Result	Competition	Source
1	28 November 2012	Stade Jos Haupert, Niederkorn, Luxembourg	Luxembourg	5–0	6–0	Friendly	
2	6 April 2015	Victor Tedesco Stadium, Ħamrun, Malta	Andorra	5–0	8–0	UEFA Women's Euro 2017 qualifying preliminary round	
