= Maria Ruzafa =

Andorran footballer

Personal information
- Full name: Maria Ruzafa Lozano
- Date of birth: 7 August 1998 (age 28)
- Place of birth: Andorra
- Position: Forward

Team information
- Current team: Rethymniaki Enosi Athliton
- Number: 9

Senior career*
Years	Team	Apps	(Gls)
–2021	ENFAF		
2021	Águilas	11	(2)
2021–2022	Ternana	12	(5)
2022–2023	Spezia	28	(12)
2023–2024	Nice	8	(2)
2024–2025	Frosinone	18	(7)
2025–	REA	23	(9)

International career^{‡}
2015–	Andorra	48	(5)
- * Club domestic league appearances and goals as of 4 June 2026 ‡ National team caps and goals as of 19:26, 30 August 2019 (UTC)

Maria Ruzafa Lozano (born 7 August 1998) is an Andorran footballer who plays as a forward for Greek club REA and the Andorra women's national team.

== Club career ==
Ruzafa has played for ENFAF in Andorra, for Águilas in Spain and for Ternana in Italy.

== International career ==
Ruzafa has been capped for the Andorra national team, appearing for the team during the 2019 FIFA Women's World Cup qualifying cycle.

On 16 February 2022, she scored her first international goal against Gibraltar in a friendly match.

== International goals ==
No.	Date	Venue	Opponent	Score	Result	Competition
1.	16 February 2022	Estadi Nacional, Andorra la Vella, Andorra	Gibraltar	3–0	4–1	Friendly
2.	3 September 2022	Center FAF, Andorra la Vella, Andorra	Liechtenstein	3–1	3–1	Friendly
3.	13 June 2023	Estadi Municipal, Peralada, Spain	Saudi Arabia	2–0	3–1	Friendly
4.	17 June 2023	Estadi Municipal, Peralada, Spain	Saudi Arabia	3–0	3–0	Friendly
5.	22 October 2025	Estadi Nacional, Andorra la Vella, Andorra	Gibraltar	2–0	2–0	Friendly

== See also ==
- List of Andorra women's international footballers
