= Valery Vigilucci =

Italian footballer

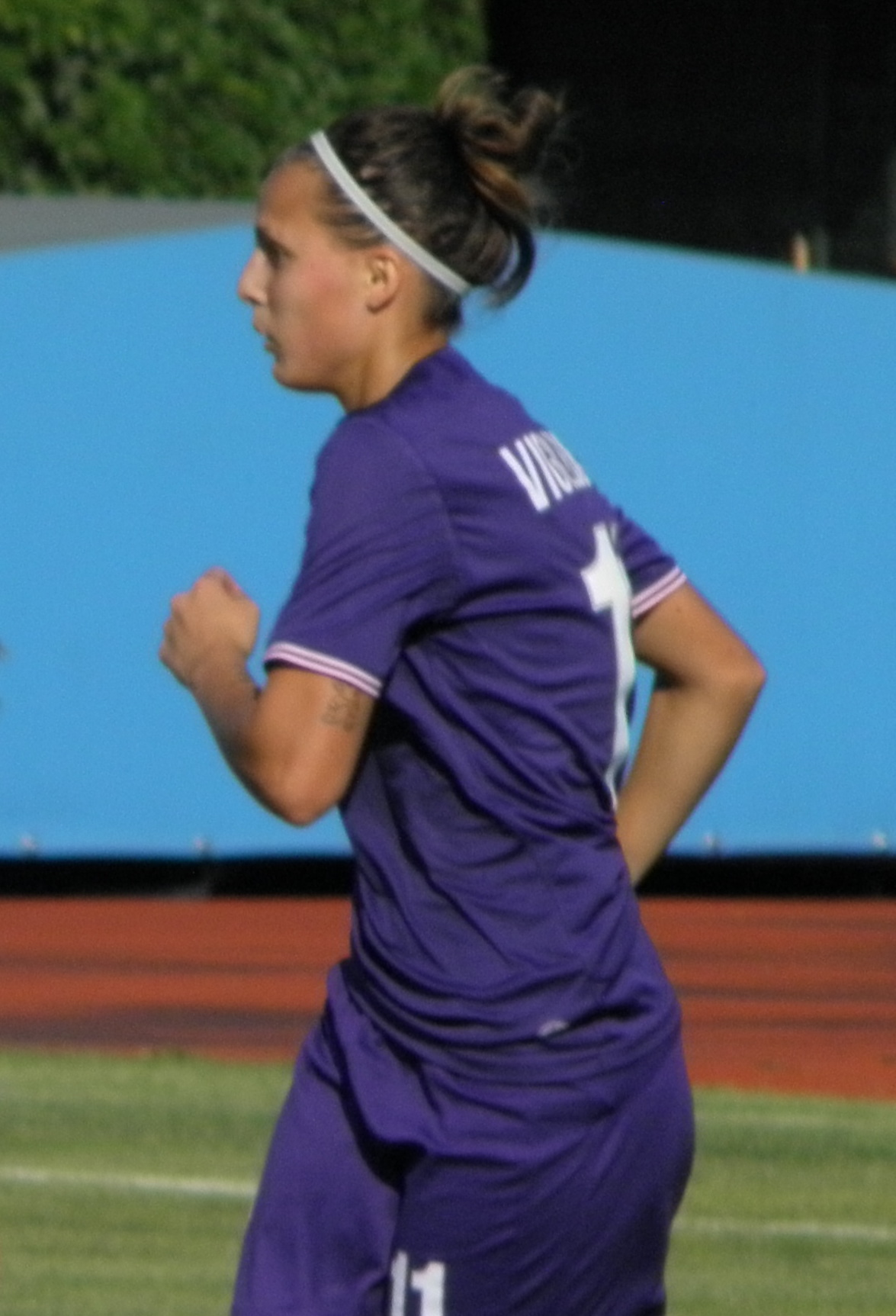
- Vigilucci with Fiorentina Women's in 2018

Personal information
- Date of birth: 15 April 1997 (age 29)
- Place of birth: Volterra, Italy
- Position: Midfielder

Team information
- Current team: Como
- Number: 17

Youth career
- Firenze

Senior career*
Years	Team	Apps	(Gls)
2013–2015	Firenze	17	(3)
2015–2022	Fiorentina	87	(8)
2023–2025	AC Milan	47	(9)
2025–2026	Genoa	22	(2)
2026–	Como		

International career^{‡}
2013	Italy U17	10	(5)
2015–2016	Italy U19	6	(1)
2019	Italy U23	1	(0)
2017	Italy	3	(0)
- * Club domestic league appearances and goals as of 21 September 2026 ‡ National team caps and goals as of 21 September 2026

Valery Vigilucci (born 15 April 1997) is an Italian footballer who plays as a midfielder for Serie A club Como and the Italy women's national team.
