= Kylie Nolan =

Welsh association football player

Personal information
- Date of birth: 27 June 1998 (age 28)
- Place of birth: Wales
- Position: Midfielder

Team information
- Current team: Gwalia United
- Number: 9

Youth career
- Cardiff City Ladies
2018–?	Bristol City	0	(0)
2018–2021	Cardiff City	22	(15)
2022–2023	Cheltenham Town	0	(0)
2023–	Cardiff City	0	(0)

International career^{‡}
Years	Team	Apps	(Gls)
2013	Wales U17	3	(1)
2016–	Wales	6	(1)
- ‡ National team caps and goals as of 10:45 14 February 2019

Kylie Nolan (born 27 June 1998) is a Welsh professional footballer who plays as a midfielder for Gwalia United (formerly Cardiff City Ladies) of the FA Women's National League South.

Nolan was born in Wales and played youth football with Cardiff City Ladies before starting her professional career with Bristol City W.F.C.

Nolan has won 6 caps for the Wales national team, scoring 1 goal.

== Early life ==
Nolan was born in Wales.

== Club career ==
Nolan was at Cardiff as a young player but failed to make a single appearance. On 5 January 2018, Nolan joined Bristol City but has not made an appearance yet.

== International career ==
Nolan made her international debut against Norway on 7 June 2016 in the UEFA Women's Championship. Nolan then did not get called up till 2018 where she played against Bosnia and Herzegovina, Russia and England in the World Cup qualification games. So far, she has 5 caps for Wales

== Club statistics ==
=== Club ===
Club	Season	League			League Cup		FA Cup		Total	
Club	Season	Division	Apps	Goals	Apps	Goals	Apps	Goals	Apps	Goals
Bristol City W.F.C.	2018-19	FA WSL	0	0	0	0	0	0	0	0
Career total			0	0	0	0	0	0	0	0

=== International ===
National team	Year	Apps	Goals
Wales	2016	1	0
Wales	2017	0	0
Wales	2018	4	0
Wales	2019	1	0
