= Danai Kaldaridou =

Greek footballer

Personal information
- Date of birth: 3 September 1997 (age 29)
- Place of birth: Athens, Greece
- Height: 1.70 m (5 ft 7 in)
- Position: Midfielder

Team information
- Current team: Grindavík/Njarðvík
- Number: 24

Youth career
- 2010–2014: Ifaistos Peristeriou
- 2014–2015: Birmingham City

College career
Years	Team	Apps	(Gls)
2015	Saint Rose Golden Knights	19	(6)
2016–2018	UT Martin Skyhawks	57	(17)

Senior career*
Years	Team	Apps	(Gls)
2019–2020	Diósgyőr	13	(3)
2020–2022	Clube de Albergaria	51	(12)
2022–2023	Damaiense	16	(0)
2023–2024	Club YLA	6	(0)
2024–2025	Sion	6	(2)
2025–	Grindavík/Njarðvík	20	(9)
2025–2026	→ OFI (loan)	11	(1)

International career^{‡}
2013	Greece U17	2	(2)
2014–2016	Greece U19	3	(2)
2019–	Greece	14	(0)
- * Club domestic league appearances and goals as of 18 May 2026 ‡ National team caps and goals as of 23 July 2024

Danai Kaldaridou (born 3 September 1997) is a Greek footballer who plays as a midfielder for Icelandic club Grindavík/Njarðvík and the Greek national team.

== International career ==
Kaldaridou made her debut for the Greece national team on 12 November 2019, coming on as a substitute for Eleni Kakambouki against the Republic of Ireland.

== Personal life ==
Of partial English descent, Kaldaridou grew up in Athens and moved to England at the age of 16.

== Honours ==
Birmingham City

- FA WSL Development League Cup: 2015

Individual

- All-OVC Newcomer Team: 2016
- All-OVC First Team: 2017, 2018
- NCAA Division I Women's All-South Region Third Team: 2018
