= Rasa Imanalijeva =

Lithuanian footballer and referee

Personal information
- Full name: Rasa Imanalijeva
- Date of birth: 29 January 1991 (age 35)
- Place of birth: Lithuania
- Position: Striker

Senior career*
Years	Team	Apps	(Gls)
2007–2018	Gintra Universitetas		(123)

International career
- Lithuania
- * Club domestic league appearances and goals

Rasa Imanalijeva is a former Lithuanian football striker and current referee, who played for Gintra Universitetas in the A Lyga. She has been the league's top scorer in the 2008, 2009, 2010 and 2011 seasons.

She has been a member of the Lithuanian national team.
