= Teresa Morató =

Andorran footballer

Personal information
- Full name: Teresa Morató Armengol
- Date of birth: 28 March 1998 (age 28)
- Place of birth: Andorra la Vella, Andorra
- Height: 1.62 m (5 ft 4 in)
- Positions: Midfielder; forward

Team information
- Current team: Valencia

Senior career*
Years	Team	Apps	(Gls)
2012–2016	ENFAF	74	(113)
2016–2020	Barcelona B		
2020–2021	Rayo Vallecano	28	(4)
2021–2024	Villarreal	53	(5)
2024–2025	Alavés	25	(7)
2025	Valencia	30	(4)

International career
2016	Catalonia U–18		
2015–	Andorra	29	(19)
- * Club domestic league appearances and goals

Teresa "Tere" Morató Armengol (born 28 March 1998) is an Andorran professional footballer who plays as a forward for Spanish club Valencia and the Andorra women's national team.

== Club career ==
=== ENFAF ===
Morató began her club career at ENFAF Crèdit Andorrà, the only Andorran women's club, which competes in Spain. In the 2015–16 season, she scored 61 goals in 24 matches, being by far the top scorer of the Catalan Women's First Division (Spanish fourth level). Despite her outstanding personal performance, the team finished 12th in the standings.

=== Barcelona B ===
Morató's impressive performances with ENFAF meant that FC Barcelona signed her for its reserve team in the summer of 2016.

=== Rayo Vallecano ===
In July 2020, Morató signed for Rayo Vallecano and became the first Andorran player to join the Spanish women's first division. She made her league debut against Real Madrid on 18 October 2020. Morató scored her first league goal against Athletic Club on 7 March 2021, scoring in the 60th minute.

=== Villarreal ===
On 5 July 2021, Morató was announced at Villarreal. She made her league debut against Sporting de Huelva on 5 September 2021. Morató scored her first league goal against Real Betis on 22 December 2021, scoring in the 84th minute.

== International career ==
In 2016, she was called up to the Catalonia U18s.

On 18 September 2021, she scored her first goal, which was also her first hat trick, against Liechtenstein in a friendly match.

== International goals ==
Scores and results list Andorra's goal tally first.

No.	Date	Venue	Opponent	Score	Result	Competition
1.	18 September 2021	Sportanlage Blumenau, Triesen, Liechtenstein	Liechtenstein	1–0	4–2	Friendly
2.	18 September 2021	Sportanlage Blumenau, Triesen, Liechtenstein	Liechtenstein	2–0	4–2	Friendly
3.	18 September 2021	Sportanlage Blumenau, Triesen, Liechtenstein	Liechtenstein	3–0	4–2	Friendly
4.	16 February 2022	Estadi Nacional, Andorra la Vella, Andorra	Gibraltar	1–0	4–1	Friendly
5.	16 February 2022	Estadi Nacional, Andorra la Vella, Andorra	Gibraltar	2–0	4–1	Friendly
6.	13 June 2023	Estadi Municipal, Peralada, Spain	Saudi Arabia	3–1	3–1	Friendly
7.	17 June 2023	Estadi Municipal, Peralada, Spain	Saudi Arabia	1–0	3–0	Friendly
8.	17 June 2023	Estadi Municipal, Peralada, Spain	Saudi Arabia	2–0	3–0	Friendly
9.	5 April 2024	Podgorica City Stadium, Podgorica, Montenegro	Montenegro	1–2	1–6	UEFA Women's Euro 2025 qualifying
10.	4 April 2025	Dasaki Stadium, Achnas, Cyprus	Cyprus	1–1	2–2	2025 UEFA Women's Nations League
11.	4 April 2025	Dasaki Stadium, Achnas, Cyprus	Cyprus	2–2	2–2	2025 UEFA Women's Nations League
12.	8 April 2025	Estadi Nacional, Andorra la Vella, Andorra	Cyprus	1–1	2–1	2025 UEFA Women's Nations League
13.	8 April 2025	Estadi Nacional, Andorra la Vella, Andorra	Cyprus	2–1	2–1	2025 UEFA Women's Nations League
14.	22 October 2025	Estadi Nacional, Andorra la Vella, Andorra	Gibraltar	1–0	2–0	Friendly
15.	25 October 2025	Estadi de la FAF, Encamp, Andorra	Gibraltar	1–0	3–1	Friendly
16.	25 October 2025	Estadi de la FAF, Encamp, Andorra	Gibraltar	2–1	3–1	Friendly
17.	25 October 2025	Estadi de la FAF, Encamp, Andorra	Gibraltar	3–1	3–1	Friendly
18.	14 April 2026	Estadi Nacional, Andorra la Vella, Andorra	Azerbaijan	1–0	1–3	2027 FIFA Women's World Cup qualification
19.	12 October 2026	Estadi Nacional, Andorra la Vella, Andorra	Faroe Islands	1–0	2–1	Friendly

== See also ==
- List of Andorra women's international footballers
