= Nina Nikolova =

Bulgarian climatologist

Nina Vankova Nikolova is a Bulgarian climatologist, and a professor at Sofia University.

== Biography ==
Nikolova graduated from Sofia University in 1991 with a degree in geography. She defended her doctoral dissertation "Changes in air temperature in the mountainous part of Bulgaria" (Note: "Изменения на температурата на въздуха в извънпланинската част на България") on 27 February 1991.

From February 1999 to January 2000, she was a specialist at the Meteorological Research Institute in Tsukuba, Japan, where she conducted research on global and regional climate change. Since 2001 she has been appointed as an assistant, and then as a chief assistant in the Department of Climatology, Hydrology and Geomorphology in the Faculty of Geology and Geography at Sofia University.

In 2001 she was appointed as a specialist geographer at the National Institute of Meteorology and Hydrology at the Bulgarian Academy of Sciences. Since April 2008 she has been a docent, and in 2018 she became a professor.

She is an editor of international journals Geographica Pannonica, Forum geografic, Acta Hydrologica Slovaca, the Bulletin of the Serbian Geographical Society, and Geographic Society of the Republic of Srpska. She is a member of the International Association for Urban Climate and International Association of Geomorphologists in Bulgaria.

She is the author or co-author of over 70 articles, studies, reports, and textbooks.

== Works ==
- Radeva, Kalina; Nikolova, Nina (2020). "Hydrometeorological Drought hazard and vulnerability assessment for Northern Bulgaria". Geographica Pannonica. 24 (2). Centre for Evaluation in Education and Science (CEON/CEES): 112–123. doi:10.5937/gp24-25074. ISSN 0354-8724. S2CID 226525298.
- Nikolova, Nina; Yanakiev, Dimitar (30 June 2020). "Climate aridity in southern Bulgaria for the period 1961-2015". Forum Geografic. XIX (1): 10–17. doi:10.5775/fg.2020.010.i. S2CID 229079637.
- Nikolova, Nina; Radeva, Kalina (2019). "Data Processing for Assessment of Meteorological and Hydrological Drought". Information Technology in Disaster Risk Reduction. IFIP Advances in Information and Communication Technology. Vol. 516. Cham: Springer International Publishing. pp. 145–160. doi:10.1007/978-3-030-18293-9_13. ISBN 978-3-030-18292-2. ISSN 1868-4238. S2CID 133609118.
- Radeva, Kalina; Nikolova, Nina; Gera, Martin (29 June 2018). "Assessment of hydro-meteorological drought in the Danube Plain, Bulgaria". Hrvatski geografski glasnik (in Croatian). 80 (1): 7–25. doi:10.21861/HGG.2018.80.01.01. ISSN 1331-5854.
- Chenkova, Nina; Nikolova, Nina. "DOI Serbia časopisi". Thermal Science. 19 (suppl. 2): 381–390. doi:10.2298/TSCI150430104C.
