= Fuchs-Park-Stadion =

Athletics stadium in Bamberg, Germany

Coordinates: 49°54′02″N 10°55′44″E

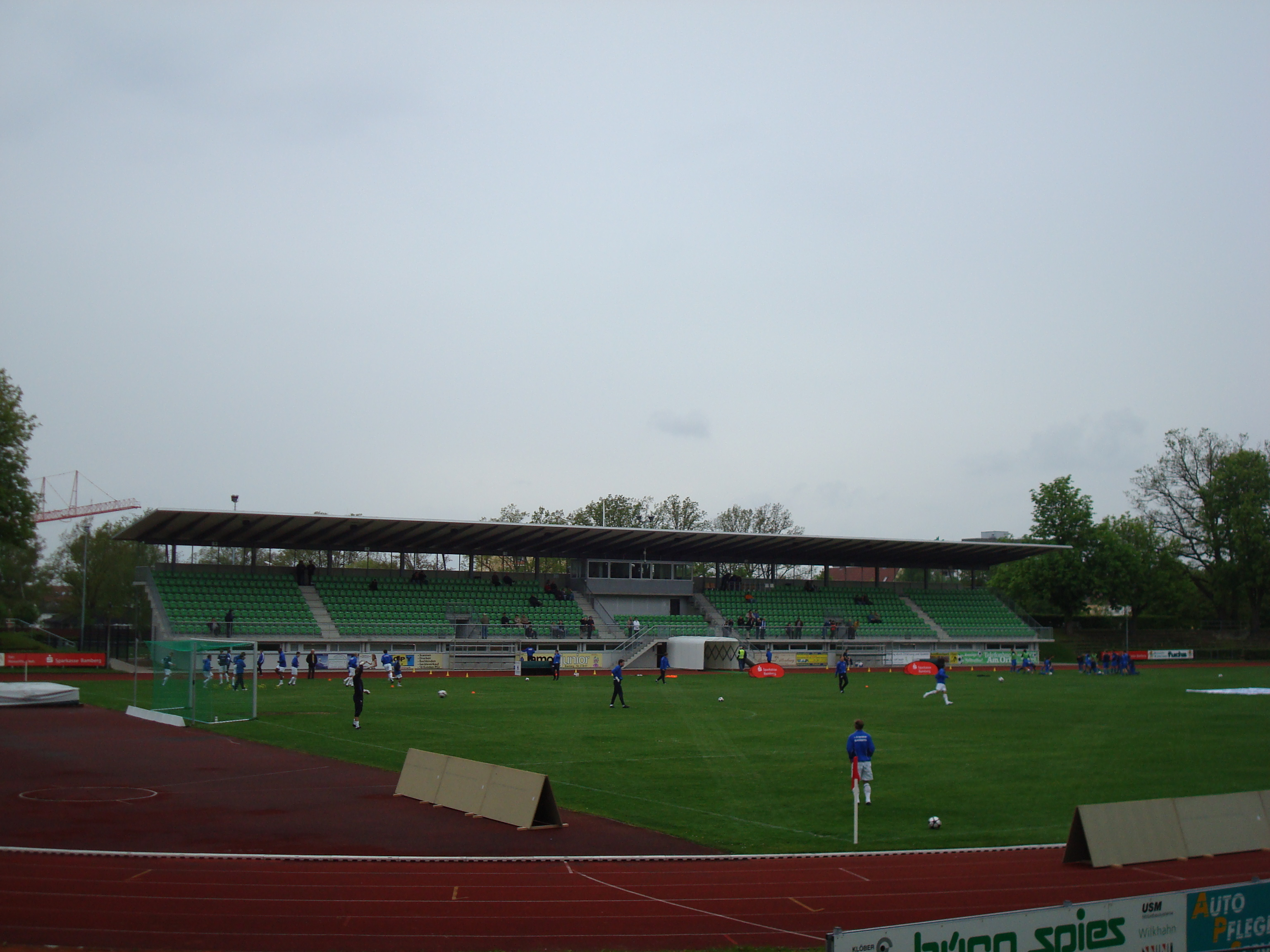
- Interactive map of Fuchs-Park-Stadion
- Former names: Hauptkampfbahn im Volkspark, Volksparkstadion
- Location: Bamberg, Germany
- Owner: Bamberg
- Capacity: 5,200

Construction
- Opened: 1926
- Expanded: 2008, 2009, 2010

Tenant
- FC Eintracht Bamberg

Fuchs-Park-Stadion is an athletics stadium in Bamberg, Germany.

== History ==
The stadium was built in 1926 and has undergone renovations in 2008 and 2009, making the seating capacity 5,200. In 2009 the city of Bamberg made an agreement with bakery company Fuchs, changing the stadium name changed to Fuchs-Park-Stadion until 2019.

== Other uses ==
Eintracht Bamberg use this stadium for their home games.
