= Stela Kotsaki =

Greek footballer

Stella Kotsaki
Personal information
- Full name: Styliani Kotsaki
- Date of birth: 2 September 1997 (age 29)
- Height: 1.62 m (5 ft 4 in)
- Position: Defender

Team information
- Current team: REA
- Number: 2

Youth career
- 2005–2009: Orfeas Choristis

Senior career*
Years	Team	Apps	(Gls)
2009–2017	Amazones Dramas		
2017–2018	Aris Thessaloniki		
2018–2021	Ergotelis	28	(11)
2021–2022	Doxa 2016	23	(7)
2022–	REA	89	(11)

International career^{‡}
2013	Greece U17	6	(2)
2014–2016	Greece U19	9	(0)
2016–	Greece	17	(0)
- * Club domestic league appearances and goals as of 29 May 2026 ‡ National team caps and goals as of 29 May 2026

Stela Kotsaki (Greek: Στέλλα Κοτσάκι; born 2 September 1997) is a Greek footballer who plays as a defender for A Division club REA in Rethimno, Crete and the Greece women's national team. She previously played for Amazones Dramas, Aris FC, Ergotelis W.F.C. and Doxa 2016.

== Career ==
Kotsaki has been capped for the Greece national team, appearing for the team during the 2019 FIFA Women's World Cup qualification.

== Honours ==
Amazones Dramas

- A Division (1): 2013–14
- B Division (1): 2011–12

Ergotelis

- B Division (1): 2019–20
