= Stefani Skerlevska =

Macedonian footballer

Personal information
- Date of birth: 30 March 1997 (age 29)
- Position: Defender

Senior career*
Years	Team	Apps	(Gls)
- Kočani

International career^{‡}
2012–2013	Macedonia U17	6	(1)
2014–2015	Macedonia U19	6	(0)
2013–2015	North Macedonia	9	(0)
- * Club domestic league appearances and goals ‡ National team caps and goals as of 22 October 2015

Stefani Skerlevska (Macedonian: Стефани Скерлевска; born 30 March 1997) is a Macedonian footballer who plays as a defender. She has been a member of the North Macedonia women's national football team.
