= Elena Porosniuc =

Moldovan footballer

Personal information
- Full name: Elena Alekseevna Porosniuc
- Date of birth: 22 October 1987 (age 39)
- Place of birth: Chișinău, Soviet Union (now Moldova)
- Position: Defender

Senior career*
Years	Team	Apps	(Gls)
2004–2006	FC Narta ȘS Drăsliceni		
2007–2008	Nadezhda Noginsk		
2009–2010	Energiya Voronezh	20	(1)
2011–2017	Kubanochka Krasnodar	110	(4)

International career
2005–2017	Moldova	20	(1)
- * Club domestic league appearances and goals

Elena Alekseevna Porosniuc (also spelled Porozhnyuk or Porojniuc; born 22 October 1987) is a retired Moldovan football defender, last played for Kubanochka Krasnodar in the Russian Championship. She previously played for Nadezhda Noginsk and Energiya Voronezh and she was a member of the currently inactive Moldovan national team.

At the end of 2017 season she retired from playing and became a coach in Kubanochka club system.

== See also ==
- List of Moldova women's international footballers
