= Nika Babnik =

Slovenian footballer

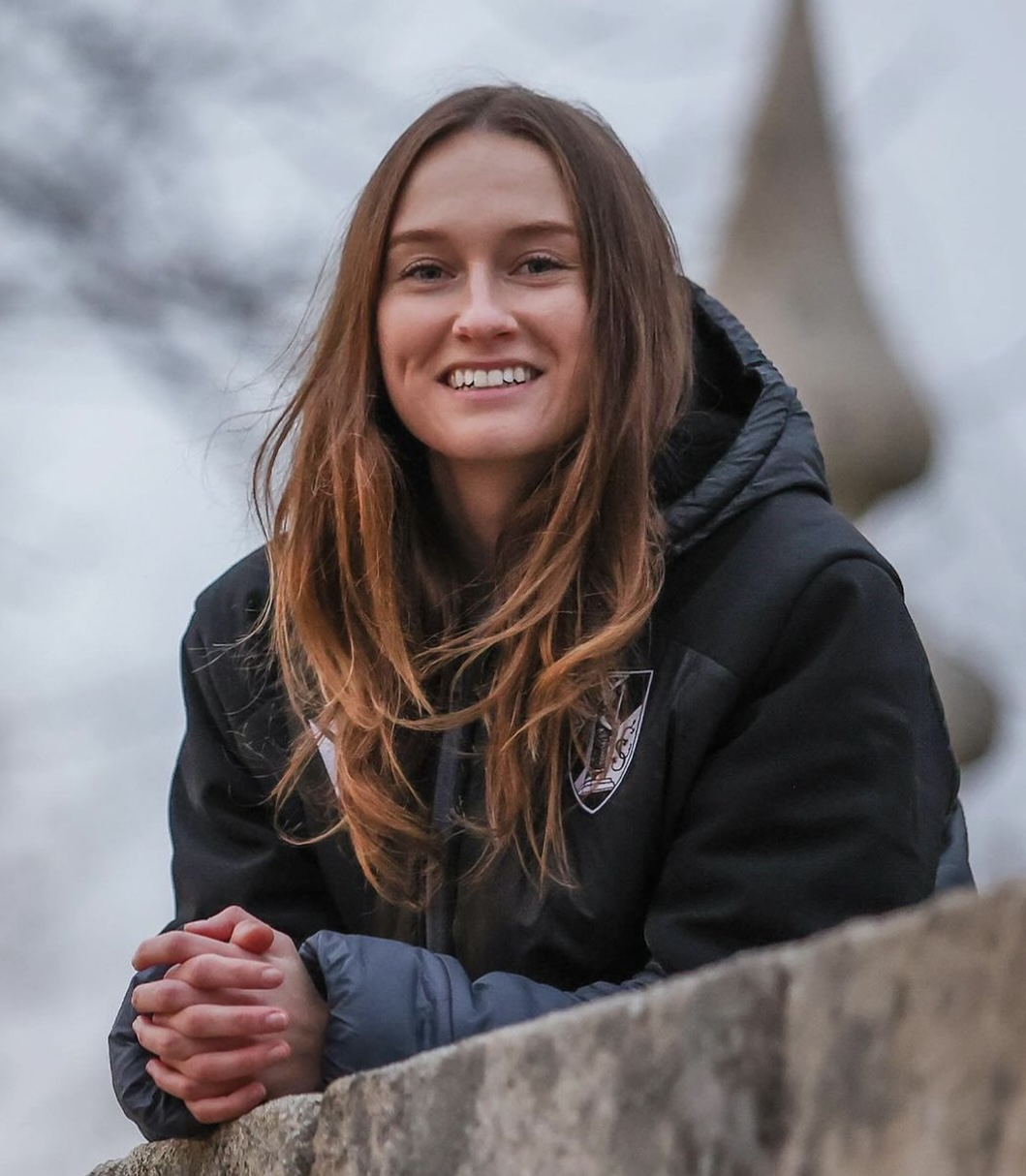
- Babnik in Guimarães

Personal information
- Date of birth: 17 September 1998 (age 28)
- Place of birth: Ljubljana, Slovenia
- Position: Midfielder

Team information
- Current team: Vitória de Guimarães
- Number: 9

Youth career
- –2016: Krim

Senior career*
Years	Team	Apps	(Gls)
2015–2019	Krim		(29)
2019–2020	Tavagnacco		
2020–2021	San Marino		
2021–2023	Clube de Albergaria		
2023–	Vitória de Guimarães		

International career^{‡}
2013–2014	Slovenia U17	5	(1)
2015–2017	Slovenia U19	11	(0)
2019–	Slovenia	2	(0)
- * Club domestic league appearances and goals as of 7 February 2021 ‡ National team caps and goals as of 1 December 2020

Nika Babnik (born 17 September 1998) is a Slovenian footballer who plays as a midfielder for Portuguese club Vitória de Guimarães and the Slovenia women's national team.
