= Liza Renlund =

Swedish footballer

Personal information
- Date of birth: 21 February 1997 (age 29)
- Place of birth: Sweden
- Position: Forward

Senior career*
Years	Team	Apps	(Gls)
2011	Älvsby IF	15	(0)
2012–2013	Piteå IF	2	(0)
2012	→ Piteå IF-2	14	(0)
2014	Umeå IK	0	(0)

International career
2012	Sweden U15	2	(1)
2013	Sweden U16	4	(1)
2013	Sweden U17	3	(1)
- * Club domestic league appearances and goals

Liza Renlund (born 21 February 1997), sometimes referred to as Lisa Renlund, is a Swedish former footballer who played as a forward.

== Club career ==
After starting her career with Älvsby IF, Renlund joined Piteå IF prior to the 2012 Damallsvenskan season. She appeared in 14 games in the Division 3 for Piteå IF 2 and was an unused substitute in one match in the Damallsvenskan. The following season she appeared in two matches in the Damallsvenskan but missed the majority of the season due to a knee injury. She later joined Umeå IK but did not appear in any matches due to problems with her knee that required two surgeries.

== International career ==
In 2013, Renlund was called up to the Swedish U16 national team to participate in the Nordic U-16 Championships in Iceland in July 2013. She appeared in four games, netting one goal.
