= Marina Fernández (footballer) =

Andorran footballer

Personal information
- Full name: Marina Fernández Muelas
- Date of birth: 11 May 1996 (age 30)
- Place of birth: Sant Julià de Lòria, Andorra
- Position: Midfielder

Team information
- Current team: ENFAF

Senior career*
Years	Team	Apps	(Gls)
2012–2014	ENFAF Andorra	46	(76)
2014–2016	Pardinyes CF	63	(6)
2017	ENFAF Andorra	13	(10)
2017–2019	SE AEM		
2019–	ENFAF		

International career^{‡}
2015–	Andorra	3	(1)
- * Club domestic league appearances and goals ‡ National team caps and goals as of 08:51, 11 April 2015 (UTC)

Marina Fernández Muelas (born 11 May 1996) is an Andorran footballer who plays as a midfielder for Andorran-based Spanish Women's First Division of Catalonia club ENFAF and the Andorra women's national team.

== International goals ==
No.	Date	Venue	Opponent	Score	Result	Competition
1.	4 April 2015	Victor Tedesco Stadium, Ħamrun, Malta	Malta	3–5	3–5	UEFA Women's Euro 2017 qualifying
2.	16 February 2022	Estadi Nacional, Andorra la Vella, Andorra	Gibraltar	4–0	4–1	Friendly
3.	3 September 2022	Center FAF, Andorra la Vella, Andorra	Liechtenstein	1–1	3–1	Friendly
4.	22 September 2023	CSR Orhei, Orhei, Moldova	Moldova	1–1	2–1	2023–24 UEFA Women's Nations League
