= Andorra women's national football team =

Women's national association football team representing Andorra

Andorra
- Association: Andorran Football Federation (Federació Andorrana de Futbol)
- Confederation: UEFA (Europe)
- Head coach: Albert Panadero
- Captain: Teresa Morató
- Most caps: Teresa Morató (19)
- Top scorer: Teresa Morató (9)
- FIFA code: AND
First colours	Second colours

FIFA ranking
- Current: 179 ▲2 (20 October 2026)
- Highest: 114 (March 2017; March 2018)
- Lowest: 184 (June – August 2024)

First international
- Unofficial : Gibraltar 0–1 Andorra (Gibraltar; 1 July 2014); Official : Andorra 3–5 Malta (Hamrun, Malta; 4 April 2015)

Biggest win
- Andorra 4–1 Gibraltar (Andorra la Vella, Andorra; 16 February 2022); Andorra 3–0 Saudi Arabia (Girona, Spain, 17 June 2023); Gibraltar 1–4 Andorra (Europa Point, Gibraltar, 23 October 2024)

Biggest defeat
- Faroe Islands 8–0 Andorra (Hamrun, Malta; 6 April 2015)

The Andorra women's national football team (Catalan: Selecció femenina de futbol d'Andorra) represents Andorra in women's association football and is controlled by the Andorran Football Federation, the governing body for football in Andorra.

== History ==
=== Background and development ===
With a FIFA trigramme of AND and having become FIFA-affiliated in 1996, the national association did not respond to a survey about the status of women's football in the country. In May of the following year, the official who answered another survey from FIFA reckoned that there were 37 active female players, all described as "100% beginners/amateurs". It was further suggested women's football had begun that year in Andorra and that there had been no previous interest in any women's sport. There was no participation in national or international competitions, though three women were employed in the association.

As of 2009, the programme was geared for young girls with player registration starting at the age of six. There were only six women's teams in the country, all for girls under the age of sixteen and includes a national and schools competition. There is also a national women's competition that took place in 2010–11. 16% of the money from the FIFA Financial Assistance Programme (FAP) is targeted at the technical development of the game, which includes women's football, sport medicine and futsal. This compares to 48% for youth football and 25% for infrastructure.

Between 1991 and 2010, there was no FIFA FUTURO III regional course for women's coaching, no women's football seminar held in the country and no FIFA MA course held for women/youth football.

As part of the development of the national team, the Andorran Football Federation has a club in the Spanish women's league system with the name of ENFAF, competing in the Catalan Primera Divisió Femení Group 2 as of 2022–23, the sixth tier. Their B team competes in the Catalan Segoba Divisió Femení Group 2, the tier below.

=== The team ===
On 1 July 2014, the senior team played its first international game in the UEFA Development Tournament celebrated in Gibraltar. Andorra defeated Gibraltar by 1–0, scored by Alba at the 61st minute. The next day, they played its second international game, losing against Luxembourg by 4–0.

On 18 December 2014, UEFA announced Andorra would take part in the UEFA Women's Euro 2017 qualifying. This was their debut competitive match at female football. In its first official game, the team lost 3–5 to Malta. Andorra finished the preliminary round with two more defeats against Faroe Islands by 0–8 and Georgia by 0–7.

On 30 June 2016, the Andorran Football Federation announced José Antonio Martín as the new head coach of the women's national team.

On 18 September 2021, Andorra achieved its second win ever after defeating Liechtenstein in a friendly match by 4–2. Teresa Morató scored a hat-trick, while the fourth goal was netted by Erica Gonçalves.

== Team image ==
=== Kits and crest ===
==== Kit suppliers ====
Kit provider	Period
(Germany) Adidas	2014–present

== Results and fixtures ==
The following is a list of match results in the last 12 months, as well as any future matches that have been scheduled.

Legend

Win Draw Lose Fixture

=== 2026 ===
3 March 2027 FIFA Women's World Cup qualification	Andorra	0–0	Hungary	Andorra la Vella, Andorra
19:00		Report		Stadium: Estadi Nacional; Attendance: 330; Referee: Roxana Recorean (Romania)

7 March 2027 FIFA Women's World Cup qualification	North Macedonia	3–0	Andorra	Bitola, North Macedonia
15:00	Galabovska 17'; Meijer 20'; Grozdanova 83'	Report		Stadium: Petar Miloševski Stadium; Attendance: 650; Referee: Charlotte Carpenter (Wales)

14 April 2027 FIFA Women's World Cup qualification	Andorra	1–3	Azerbaijan	Andorra la Vella, Andorra
19:00	Morató 12'	Report	Jafarzade 15', 50' (pen.); Manya 90+5'	Stadium: Estadi Nacional; Attendance: 353; Referee: Kristina Kozoroh (Ukraine)

18 April 2027 FIFA Women's World Cup qualification	Azerbaijan	2–0	Andorra	Absheron, Azerbaijan
15:00 (17:00 UTC+4)	Açar 12'; Manya 64'	Report		Stadium: Bank Respublika Arena; Attendance: 130; Referee: Vesna Miletić (Bosnia and Herzegovina)

5 June 2027 FIFA Women's World Cup qualification	Andorra	0–1	North Macedonia	Andorra la Vella, Andorra
19:30		Report	Nikolovska 86'	Stadium: Estadi Nacional; Attendance: 347; Referee: Ana Afo (Portugal)

9 June 2027 FIFA Women's World Cup qualification	Hungary	6–1	Andorra	Budapest, Hungary
19:00	Vik. Nagy 3'; Kaján 39'; Va. Nagy 41'; Fenyvesi 57', 69'; Pusztai 89'	Report (FIFA); Report (UEFA)	Da Cruz 55'	Stadium: Illovszky Rudolf Stadion; Referee: Melek Dakan (Turkey)

9 October Friendly	Andorra	0–5	Faroe Islands	Andorra la Vella, Andorra
15:00 CET		Report	Tórolvsdóttir 22'; Brændstrup 66'; Shaki 76'; Djurhuus 83', 90+1'	Stadium: Estadi Nacional; Attendance: 100

12 October Friendly	Andorra	2–1	Faroe Islands	Andorra la Vella, Andorra
17:00 CET	Morato 16'; Bukhrikidze 63'	Report	Sevdal 47'	Stadium: Estadi Nacional; Attendance: 250

== Head-to-head record ==
As of 12 October 2026

Team	GP	W	D	L	GF	GA	GD
Azerbaijan	2	0	0	2	1	5	−4
Cyprus	2	1	1	0	4	3	+1
Faroe Islands	7	1	0	6	3	26	−23
Georgia	3	0	0	3	2	11	−9
Gibraltar	6	6	0	0	18	5	+13
Greece	2	0	0	2	0	9	−9
Hungary	2	0	1	1	1	6	–5
Israel	1	0	0	1	0	7	−7
Latvia	2	0	0	2	0	8	−8
Liechtenstein	2	2	0	0	7	3	+4
Lithuania	1	0	0	1	0	2	−2
Luxembourg	2	0	0	2	1	6	−5
Malta	7	0	1	6	3	21	−18
Moldova	3	1	1	1	1	6	−5
Montenegro	2	0	0	2	2	11	−9
North Macedonia	2	0	0	2	0	4	−4
Saudi Arabia	2	2	0	0	6	1	+5
Tahiti	1	0	1	0	0	0	0
Total	49	13	5	31	49	136	−87

== Season to season ==
This is a list of the performances of ENFAF, the Andorran Football Federation's team in the Spanish women's league system.

Season	Tier	Division	Place
2011–12	4	1ª Catalana	16th
2012–13	5	2ª Catalana	3rd
2013–14	5	2ª Catalana	1st
2014–15	4	1ª Catalana	9th
2015–16	4	1ª Catalana	11th
2016–17	4	1ª Catalana	9th
2017–18	4	1ª Catalana	6th
2018–19	4	1ª Catalana	6th
2019–20	5	1ª Catalana	2nd
2020–21	4	Pref. Cat.	15th
2021–22	5	Pref. Cat.	10th
2022–23	5	Pref. Cat.	5th

== Coaching staff ==
=== Current coaching staff ===
Position	Name	Ref.
Head coach	(Andorra) Albert Panadero	

=== Manager history ===
- (Andorra) Joan Carles Ruiz (2014–2016)
- (Andorra) José Antonio Martín (2016–2023)
- (Andorra) Albert Panadero (2024–)

== Players ==
=== Current squad ===
- The following players were named for the 2025 UEFA Women's Nations League matches against Georgia and Malta on 30 May and 3 June 2025.

Caps and goals are correct, as of 9 April 2024.

No.	Pos.	Player	Date of birth (age)	Caps	Goals	Club
	GK	Alex Cardoso				
23	GK	Alba Martín	17 November 2008 (age 18)			(Andorran Football Federation) ENFAF
20	DF	Laia Solé			0	(Andorran Football Federation)
4	DF	Neus Rosas	4 August 2005 (age 21)	8	0	(United States Soccer Federation) Iowa Western Reivers
20	DF	Laia Sin	3 May 2003 (age 23)	8	0	(Andorran Football Federation) ENFAF
15	DF	Paula da Silva	7 December 2000 (age 25)	8	0	(Andorran Football Federation) ENFAF
	DF	Zoe Planaguma				
	DF	Olga Sabio	28 November 1999 (age 26)			
	MF	Marina Fernández (captain)	11 May 1996 (age 30)	8	1	(Royal Spanish Football Federation) AEM B
	MF	Elia Quilez			0	(Andorran Football Federation)
	MF	Erica Gonçalves	9 May 2002 (age 24)	8	0	(Andorran Football Federation) ENFAF
	MF	Maria da Cruz	10 May 2004 (age 22)	5	0	(Andorran Football Federation) ENFAF
	MF	Cristina Gonzalez			0	(Andorran Football Federation)
6	FW	Tere Morató	28 March 1998 (age 28)	8	1	(Royal Spanish Football Federation) Alavés
	FW	Emma Duro			0	(Andorran Football Federation)
16	FW	Clàudia Plaja	19 April 2005 (age 21)	2	0	(Royal Spanish Football Federation) Olympia Las Rozas B
	FW	Carla Ber				
10	FW	Maria Ruzafa	7 August 1998 (age 28)	7	0	(French Football Federation) Nice
11	FW	Gemma Lluch	16 January 2004 (age 22)	3	0	(Andorran Football Federation) ENFAF
	FW	Ariana Goncalves				

=== Recent call-ups ===
The following players have been called up to a squad in the past 12 months.

Pos.	Player	Date of birth (age)	Caps	Goals	Club	Latest call-up

== Records ==
Friendly games are not included in records

=== Most capped players ===
Rank	Player	Caps	Goals	Years
1	Teresa Morató	19	9	2015-
2	Alba López	3	1	2015–
2	Bibiana Gonçalves	3	1	2015–
2	Marina Fernández	3	1	2015–
2	Daniela Rodrigues	3	0	2015–
2	Samantha Reyes	3	0	2015–
2	Margot Llobera	3	0	2015–
2	Andreina Silva	3	0	2015–
2	Sònia Carrancà	3	0	2015–

=== Top goalscorers ===
Rank	Player	Caps	Goals	Years
1	Teresa Morató	19	9	2015-
2	Alba López	3	1	2015–
2	Bibiana Gonçalves	3	1	2015–
2	Marina Fernández	3	1	2015–

== Competitive record ==
=== FIFA Women's World Cup ===
FIFA Women's World Cup record								Qualification record							
Year	Result	Pld	W	D*	L	GF	GA	Pld	W	D*	L	GF	GA	P/R	Rnk
(China) 1991 to (Germany) 2011	Did not exist							Did not exist							
(Canada) 2015	Did not enter							Did not enter							
(France) 2019	Did not qualify							3	0	0	3	0	13	–	
(Australia) (New Zealand) 2023	Did not enter							Did not enter							
(Brazil) 2027	To be determined							To be determined							
(Costa Rica) (Jamaica) (Mexico) (United States) 2031	To be determined							To be determined							
(United Kingdom) 2035	To be determined							To be determined							
Total	0/6	–	–	–	–	–	–	3	0	0	3	0	13	–	

As of 5 December 2024
*Draws include knockout matches decided on penalty kicks.

=== UEFA Women's Championship ===
UEFA Women's Championship record								Qualifying record							
Year	Result	Pld	W	D*	L	GF	GA	Pld	W	D*	L	GF	GA	P/R	Rnk
1984 to (Sweden) 2013	Did not exist							Did not exist							
(Netherlands) 2017	Did not qualify							3	0	0	3	3	20	–	
(England) 2022	Did not enter							Did not enter							
(Switzerland) 2025	Did not qualify							6	0	0	6	2	28	Same position	51st
(Germany) 2029	To be determined							To be determined							
Total	0/4	–	–	–	–	–	–	9	0	0	9	5	48	51st	

As of 16 July 2024
*Draws include knockout matches decided on penalty kicks.

=== UEFA Women's Nations League ===
UEFA Women's Nations League record
Year	League	Group	Pos	Pld	W	D	L	GF	GA	P/R	Rnk
2023–24	C	1	3rd	6	1	1	4	2	17	Same position	47th
2025	C	2	4th	6	1	2	3	6	8	Same position	51st
Total				12	2	3	7	8	25	–	

As of 7 April 2026

▲	Promoted at end of season
Same position	No movement at end of season
▼	Relegated at end of season
*	Participated in promotion/relegation play-offs

== See also ==
- Andorra women's national under-17 football team
