= 2015–16 UEFA Women's Champions League knockout phase =

Tournament details
- Dates: 07 October 2015 – 26 May 2016
- Teams: 32

The 2015–16 UEFA Women's Champions League knockout phase began on 7 October 2015 and concluded on 26 May 2016 with the final at Mapei Stadium – Città del Tricolore in Reggio Emilia, Italy, which decided the champions of the 2015–16 UEFA Women's Champions League. A total of 32 teams competed in the knockout phase.

Times from 25 October 2015 up to 26 March 2016 (round of 16 and quarter-finals first legs) were CET (UTC+1), all other times were CEST (UTC+2).

== Round and draw dates ==
The schedule of the competition was as follows (all draws were held at the UEFA headquarters in Nyon, Switzerland).

Round	Draw	First leg	Second leg
Round of 32	20 August 2015, 13:30	7–8 October 2015	14–15 October 2015
Round of 16	19 October 2015, 13:30	11–12 November 2015	18–19 November 2015
Quarter-finals	27 November 2015, 13:30	23–24 March 2016	30–31 March 2016
Semi-finals	27 November 2015, 13:30	23–24 April 2016	30 April – 1 May 2016
Final	27 November 2015, 13:30	26 May 2016 at Mapei Stadium – Città del Tricolore, Reggio Emilia	

== Format ==
The knockout phase involved 32 teams: 24 teams which qualified directly, and the eight group winners from the qualifying round.

Each tie in the knockout phase, apart from the final, was played over two legs, with each team playing one leg at home. The team that scored more goals on aggregate over the two legs advanced to the next round. If the aggregate score was level, the away goals rule was applied, i.e. the team that scored more goals away from home over the two legs advanced. If away goals were also equal, then 30 minutes of extra time were played. The away goals rule was again applied after extra time, i.e. if there were goals scored during extra time and the aggregate score was still level, the visiting team advanced by virtue of more away goals scored. If no goals were scored during extra time, the tie was decided by a penalty shoot-out. In the final, which was played as a single match, if scores were level at the end of normal time, extra time was played, followed by a penalty shoot-out if scores remained tied.

The mechanism of the draws for each round was as follows:

- In the draw for the round of 32, the sixteen teams with the highest UEFA coefficients were seeded (with the title holders being the automatic top seed), and the other sixteen teams were unseeded. The seeded teams were drawn against the unseeded teams, with the seeded teams hosting the second leg. Teams from the same association could not be drawn against each other.
- In the draw for the round of 16, the eight teams with the highest UEFA coefficients were seeded (with the title holders being the automatic top seed should they qualify), and the other eight teams were unseeded. The seeded teams were drawn against the unseeded teams, with the seeded teams hosting the second leg. Teams from the same association could not be drawn against each other.
- In the draws for the quarter-finals onwards, there were no seedings, and teams from the same association could be drawn against each other.

== Qualified teams ==
Below are the 32 teams which participated in the knockout phase (with their 2015 UEFA club coefficients, which took into account their performance in European competitions from 2010–11 to 2014–15 plus 33% of their association coefficient from the same time span).

Bye to round of 32
Team	Coeff
(Germany) Frankfurt (Title holders)	72.680
(France) Lyon	115.080
(Germany) Wolfsburg	97.680
(Sweden) Rosengård	69.295
(France) Paris Saint-Germain	59.080
(Denmark) Brøndby	52.870
(Denmark) Fortuna Hjørring	50.870
(Scotland) Glasgow City	38.570
(Russia) Zvezda Perm	37.520
(Spain) Barcelona	36.530
(Switzerland) Zürich	32.910
(Germany) Bayern Munich	31.680
(Russia) Zorky Krasnogorsk	29.520
(England) Liverpool	24.140
(Italy) AGSM Verona	20.550
(Sweden) KIF Örebro	20.295
(Belgium) Standard Liège	19.610
(England) Chelsea	19.140
(Austria) St. Pölten-Spratzern	14.725
(Italy) Brescia	14.550
(Czech Republic) Slavia Praha	13.560
(Spain) Atlético Madrid	13.530
(Kazakhstan) BIIK Kazygurt	12.940
(Norway) Lillestrøm SK	12.075

Advanced from qualifying round
Group	Winners	Coeff
1	(Belarus) FC Minsk	5.130
2	(Greece) PAOK	12.965
3	(Iceland) Stjarnan	12.610
4	(Netherlands) Twente	14.610
5	(Romania) Olimpia Cluj	17.620
6	(Serbia) Spartak Subotica	15.620
7	(Poland) Medyk Konin	11.105
8	(Finland) PK-35 Vantaa	13.290

== Bracket ==
Round of 32
(England) Chelsea	1	3	4
(Scotland) Glasgow City	0	0	0
(Serbia) Spartak Subotica	0	0	0
(Germany) Wolfsburg	0	4	4
(Italy) Brescia	1	1	2
(England) Liverpool	0	0	0
(Belarus) FC Minsk	0	0	0
(Denmark) Fortuna Hjørring	2	4	6
(Norway) Lillestrøm SK	1	1	2
(Switzerland) Zürich	0	1	1
(Belgium) Standard Liège	0	0	0
(Germany) Frankfurt	2	6	8
(Italy) AGSM Verona	5	2	7
(Austria) St. Pölten-Spratzern	4	2	6
(Finland) PK-35 Vantaa	0	0	0
(Sweden) Rosengård	2	7	9
(Spain) Atlético Madrid	0	3	3
(Russia) Zorky Krasnogorsk	2	0	2
(Poland) Medyk Konin	0	0	0
(France) Lyon	6	3	9
(Czech Republic) Slavia Praha	4	0	4
(Denmark) Brøndby	1	1	2
(Russia) Zvezda Perm	3	3	6
(Iceland) Stjarnan	1	1	2
(Germany) Bayern Munich	1	2	3
(Netherlands) Twente (a)	1	2	3
(Kazakhstan) BIIK Kazygurt	1	1	2
(Spain) Barcelona	1	4	5
(Greece) PAOK	0	0	0
(Sweden) KIF Örebro	3	5	8
(Romania) Olimpia Cluj	0	0	0
(France) Paris Saint-Germain	6	9	15

Round of 16
(England) Chelsea	1	0	1
(Germany) Wolfsburg	2	2	4
(Italy) Brescia	1	1	2
(Denmark) Fortuna Hjørring	0	1	1
(Norway) Lillestrøm SK	0	2	2
(Germany) Frankfurt (p)	2	0	2
(Italy) AGSM Verona	1	1	2
(Sweden) Rosengård	3	5	8
(Spain) Atlético Madrid	1	0	1
(France) Lyon	3	6	9
(Czech Republic) Slavia Praha	2	0	2
(Russia) Zvezda Perm	1	0	1
(Netherlands) Twente	0	0	0
(Spain) Barcelona	1	1	2
(Sweden) KIF Örebro	1	0	1
(France) Paris Saint-Germain (a)	1	0	1

Quarter-finals
(Germany) Wolfsburg	3	3	6
(Italy) Brescia	0	0	0
(Germany) Frankfurt (p)	1	0	1
(Sweden) Rosengård	0	1	1
(France) Lyon	9	0	9
(Czech Republic) Slavia Praha	1	0	1
(Spain) Barcelona	0	0	0
(France) Paris Saint-Germain	0	1	1

Semi-finals
(Germany) Wolfsburg	4	0	4
(Germany) Frankfurt	0	1	1
(France) Lyon	7	1	8
(France) Paris Saint-Germain	0	0	0

Final
(Germany) Wolfsburg	1
(France) Lyon (p)	1

== Round of 32 ==
The draw for the round of 32 was held on 20 August 2015.

Seeded	Unseeded
(Germany) Frankfurt; (France) Lyon; (Germany) Wolfsburg; (Sweden) Rosengård; (France) Paris Saint-Germain; (Denmark) Brøndby; (Denmark) Fortuna Hjørring; (Scotland) Glasgow City; (Russia) Zvezda Perm; (Spain) Barcelona; (Switzerland) Zürich; (Germany) Bayern Munich; (Russia) Zorky Krasnogorsk; (England) Liverpool; (Italy) AGSM Verona; (Sweden) KIF Örebro	(Belgium) Standard Liège; (England) Chelsea; (Romania) Olimpia Cluj; (Serbia) Spartak Subotica; (Austria) St. Pölten-Spratzern; (Netherlands) Twente; (Italy) Brescia; (Czech Republic) Slavia Praha; (Spain) Atlético Madrid; (Finland) PK-35 Vantaa; (Greece) PAOK; (Kazakhstan) BIIK Kazygurt; (Iceland) Stjarnan; (Norway) Lillestrøm SK; (Poland) Medyk Konin; (Belarus) FC Minsk

Notes

1. ^{†} Advanced from qualifying round.

The first legs were played on 7 and 8 October, and the second legs were played on 14 and 15 October 2015.

Team 1	Agg.	Team 2	1st leg	2nd leg
BIIK Kazygurt (Kazakhstan)	2–5	(Spain) Barcelona	1–1	1–4
Medyk Konin (Poland)	0–9	(France) Lyon	0–6	0–3
Olimpia Cluj (Romania)	0–15	(France) Paris Saint-Germain	0–6	0–9
Slavia Praha (Czech Republic)	4–2	(Denmark) Brøndby	4–1	0–1
Standard Liège (Belgium)	0–8	(Germany) Frankfurt	0–2	0–6
PAOK (Greece)	0–8	(Sweden) KIF Örebro	0–3	0–5
Twente (Netherlands)	3–3 (a)	(Germany) Bayern Munich	1–1	2–2
Atlético Madrid (Spain)	3–2	(Russia) Zorky Krasnogorsk	0–2	3–0
St. Pölten-Spratzern (Austria)	6–7	(Italy) AGSM Verona	4–5	2–2
Stjarnan (Iceland)	2–6	(Russia) Zvezda Perm	1–3	1–3
Lillestrøm SK (Norway)	2–1	(Switzerland) Zürich	1–0	1–1 (a.e.t.)
Chelsea (England)	4–0	(Scotland) Glasgow City	1–0	3–0
PK-35 Vantaa (Finland)	0–9	(Sweden) Rosengård	0–2	0–7
FC Minsk (Belarus)	0–6	(Denmark) Fortuna Hjørring	0–2	0–4
Spartak Subotica (Serbia)	0–4	(Germany) Wolfsburg	0–0	0–4
Brescia (Italy)	2–0	(England) Liverpool	1–0	1–0

7 October 2015
11:00

BIIK Kazygurt (Kazakhstan)	1–1	(Spain) Barcelona
Woods 82'	Report	R. García 57'

BIIK Stadium, Shymkent
Attendance: 2,000
Referee: Karolina Radzik-Johan (Poland)
14 October 2015
19:00

Barcelona (Spain)	4–1	(Kazakhstan) BIIK Kazygurt
Hermoso 11', 65'; Serrano 20'; Unzué 52'	Report	Gabelia 90'

Mini Estadi, Barcelona
Attendance: 1,115
Referee: Sofia Karagiorgi (Cyprus)

Barcelona won 5–2 on aggregate.

8 October 2015
15:30

Medyk Konin (Poland)	0–6	(France) Lyon
	Report	Hegerberg 19', 37'; Le Sommer 35'; Bremer 73', 81'; Renard 84'

Stadion im. Złotej Jedenastki, Konin
Attendance: 1,480
Referee: Pernilla Larsson (Sweden)
14 October 2015
18:30

Lyon (France)	3–0	(Poland) Medyk Konin
Le Sommer 2'; Hegerberg 69', 89'	Report

Stade de Gerland, Lyon
Attendance: 3,808
Referee: Barbara Bollenberg (Austria)

Lyon won 9–0 on aggregate.

8 October 2015
16:00

Olimpia Cluj (Romania)	0–6	(France) Paris Saint-Germain
	Report	Mittag 38', 71'; Cristiane 43', 54'; Cruz 79'; Sarr 90+1'

Cluj Arena, Cluj-Napoca
Attendance: 883
Referee: Esther Azzopardi (Malta)
14 October 2015
20:30

Paris Saint-Germain (France)	9–0	(Romania) Olimpia Cluj
Delannoy 21' (pen.); Cristiane 42', 49', 63'; Dahlkvist 53'; Horan 65', 66'; Olar 70' (o.g.); Sarr 84'	Report

Stade Sébastien Charléty, Paris
Attendance: 1,249
Referee: Lina Lehtovaara (Finland)

Paris Saint-Germain won 15–0 on aggregate.

7 October 2015
18:45

Slavia Praha (Czech Republic)	4–1	(Denmark) Brøndby
Divišová 8', 13'; Budošová 24'; Chlastáková 52'	Report	Kristiansen 6'

Eden Arena, Prague
Attendance: 1,802
Referee: Rhona Daly (Republic of Ireland)
14 October 2015
19:00

Brøndby (Denmark)	1–0	(Czech Republic) Slavia Praha
Boye Sørensen 2'	Report

Brøndby Stadium, Brøndby
Attendance: 1,206
Referee: Riem Hussein (Germany)

Slavia Praha won 4–2 on aggregate.

7 October 2015
19:00

Standard Liège (Belgium)	0–2	(Germany) Frankfurt
	Report	Schmidt 10' (pen.); Garefrekes 86'

Stade Maurice Dufrasne, Liège
Attendance: 2,007
Referee: Vesna Budimir (Croatia)
15 October 2015
16:30

Frankfurt (Germany)	6–0	(Belgium) Standard Liège
Islacker 6'; Garefrekes 44'; Bartusiak 48' (pen.); Ōgimi 68'; Crnogorčević 84'; Linden 86'	Report

Stadion am Brentanobad, Frankfurt
Attendance: 1,380
Referee: Morag Pirie (Scotland)

Frankfurt won 8–0 on aggregate.

7 October 2015
17:00

PAOK (Greece)	0–3	(Sweden) KIF Örebro
	Report	Talonen 47'; Engström 60' (pen.); Abrahamsson 89'

Toumba Stadium, Thessaloniki
Attendance: 490
Referee: Marija Kurtes (Germany)
14 October 2015
20:00

KIF Örebro (Sweden)	5–0	(Greece) PAOK
Michael 10'; Markou 15' (o.g.); Talonen 24'; Chukwudi 50'; Spetsmark 76'	Report

Behrn Arena, Örebro
Attendance: 2,247
Referee: Zuzana Kováčová (Slovakia)

KIF Örebro won 8–0 on aggregate.

7 October 2015
20:00

Twente (Netherlands)	1–1	(Germany) Bayern Munich
R. Jansen 30'	Report	Leupolz 85'

De Grolsch Veste, Enschede
Attendance: 6,512
Referee: Katalin Kulcsár (Hungary)
14 October 2015
19:00

Bayern Munich (Germany)	2–2	(Netherlands) Twente
Erman 29' (o.g.); Behringer 75' (pen.)	Report	Roord 13'; Roetgering 56' (pen.)

Grünwalder Stadion, Munich
Attendance: 1,020
Referee: Kateryna Monzul (Ukraine)

3–3 on aggregate. Twente won on away goals.

7 October 2015
20:00

Atlético Madrid (Spain)	0–2	(Russia) Zorky Krasnogorsk
	Report	Slonova 18', 71'

Ciudad Deportiva Cerro del Espino, Majadahonda
Attendance: 1,503
Referee: Marte Sørø (Norway)
15 October 2015
18:00

Zorky Krasnogorsk (Russia)	0–3	(Spain) Atlético Madrid
	Report	Esther 9'; Beltrán 84'; D. García 87'

Rodina Stadium, Khimki
Attendance: 250
Referee: Carina Vitulano (Italy)

Atlético Madrid won 3–2 on aggregate.

7 October 2015
19:00

St. Pölten-Spratzern (Austria)	4–5	(Italy) AGSM Verona
Pöltl 29'; Sipos 31'; Vágó 37' (pen.); Pinther 77'	Report	Larsen 21'; Bonetti 24'; Pirone 41', 73'; Gabbiadini 82' (pen.)

Voithplatz, Sankt Pölten
Attendance: 1,000
Referee: Marta Acedo (Spain)
15 October 2015
20:30

AGSM Verona (Italy)	2–2	(Austria) St. Pölten-Spratzern
Gabbiadini 12' (pen.), 87' (pen.)	Report	Vágó 8', 69'

Stadio Marc'Antonio Bentegodi, Verona
Attendance: 2,800
Referee: Esther Staubli (Switzerland)

AGSM Verona won 7–6 on aggregate.

7 October 2015
21:00

Stjarnan (Iceland)	1–3	(Russia) Zvezda Perm
Stefánsdóttir 28'	Report	Boychenko 5'; Apanaschenko 13'; Kurochkina 32'

Stjörnuvöllur, Garðabær
Attendance: 347
Referee: Teodora Albon (Romania)
15 October 2015
16:00

Zvezda Perm (Russia)	3–1	(Iceland) Stjarnan
Kurochkina 45'; Apanaschenko 62', 90' (pen.)	Report	Makarenko 78' (o.g.)

Zvezda Stadium, Perm
Attendance: 4,500
Referee: Jana Adámková (Czech Republic)

Zvezda Perm won 6–2 on aggregate.

7 October 2015
19:00

Lillestrøm SK (Norway)	1–0	(Switzerland) Zürich
Bachor 63'	Report

Åråsen Stadion, Lillestrøm
Attendance: 1,423
Referee: Anastasia Pustovoitova (Russia)
14 October 2015
19:00

Zürich (Switzerland)	1–1 (a.e.t.)	(Norway) Lillestrøm SK
Humm 87'	Report	Mykjåland 99'

Letzigrund, Zürich
Attendance: 3,271
Referee: Florence Guillemin (France)

Lillestrøm SK won 2–1 on aggregate.

8 October 2015
20:30

Chelsea (England)	1–0	(Scotland) Glasgow City
Kirby 39'	Report

Wheatsheaf Park, Staines-upon-Thames
Attendance: 1,100
Referee: Olga Zadinová (Czech Republic)
14 October 2015
20:30

Glasgow City (Scotland)	0–3	(England) Chelsea
	Report	Aluko 22'; Kirby 57'; Flaherty 61'

Excelsior Stadium, Airdrie
Attendance: 1,199
Referee: Bibiana Steinhaus (Germany)

Chelsea won 4–0 on aggregate.

7 October 2015
16:30

PK-35 Vantaa (Finland)	0–2	(Sweden) Rosengård
	Report	Ilestedt 10'; Nilsson 75'

ISS Stadion, Vantaa
Attendance: 1,215
Referee: Eleni Lampadariou (Greece)
14 October 2015
19:00

Rosengård (Sweden)	7–0	(Finland) PK-35 Vantaa
Bélanger 2', 25', 76'; Van de Ven 6', 52'; Andonova 31'; Marta 45+1'	Report

Malmö IP, Malmö
Attendance: 750
Referee: Sandra Bastos (Portugal)

Rosengård SK won 9–0 on aggregate.

8 October 2015
14:30

FC Minsk (Belarus)	0–2	(Denmark) Fortuna Hjørring
	Report	Nadim 33', 61' (pen.)

FC Minsk Stadium, Minsk
Attendance: 1,500
Referee: Lorraine Clark (Scotland)
14 October 2015
19:00

Fortuna Hjørring (Denmark)	4–0	(Belarus) FC Minsk
Olar-Spânu 20', 90+2' (pen.); Nadim 29'; Jensen 46'	Report

Hjørring Stadium, Hjørring
Attendance: 1,572
Referee: Ana Minić (Serbia)

Fortuna Hjørring won 6–0 on aggregate.

8 October 2015
15:00

Spartak Subotica (Serbia)	0–0	(Germany) Wolfsburg
	Report

Subotica City Stadium, Subotica
Attendance: 1,200
Referee: Gyöngyi Gaál (Hungary)
14 October 2015
17:00

Wolfsburg (Germany)	4–0	(Serbia) Spartak Subotica
Faißt 30'; Simic 44'; Dickenmann 54'; Hansen 62'	Report

AOK Stadion, Wolfsburg
Attendance: 836
Referee: Silvia Spinelli (Italy)

Wolfsburg won 4–0 on aggregate.

7 October 2015
20:45

Brescia (Italy)	1–0	(England) Liverpool
Gama 28'	Report

Stadio Mario Rigamonti, Brescia
Attendance: 2,700
Referee: Sara Persson (Sweden)
14 October 2015
19:30

Liverpool (England)	0–1	(Italy) Brescia
	Report	Bonansea 26'

Halton Stadium, Widnes
Attendance: 387
Referee: Stéphanie Frappart (France)

Brescia won 2–0 on aggregate.

== Round of 16 ==
The draw for the round of 16 was held on 19 October 2015.

Seeded	Unseeded
(Germany) Frankfurt; (France) Lyon; (Germany) Wolfsburg; (Sweden) Rosengård; (France) Paris Saint-Germain; (Denmark) Fortuna Hjørring; (Russia) Zvezda Perm; (Spain) Barcelona	(Italy) AGSM Verona; (Sweden) KIF Örebro; (England) Chelsea; (Netherlands) Twente; (Italy) Brescia; (Czech Republic) Slavia Praha; (Spain) Atlético Madrid; (Norway) Lillestrøm SK

The first legs were played on 11 and 12 November, and the second legs were played on 18 and 19 November 2015.

Team 1	Agg.	Team 2	1st leg	2nd leg
Twente (Netherlands)	0–2	(Spain) Barcelona	0–1	0–1
Brescia (Italy)	2–1	(Denmark) Fortuna Hjørring	1–0	1–1
Atlético Madrid (Spain)	1–9	(France) Lyon	1–3	0–6
Slavia Praha (Czech Republic)	2–1	(Russia) Zvezda Perm	2–1	0–0
Chelsea (England)	1–4	(Germany) Wolfsburg	1–2	0–2
KIF Örebro (Sweden)	1–1 (a)	(France) Paris Saint-Germain	1–1	0–0
AGSM Verona (Italy)	2–8	(Sweden) Rosengård	1–3	1–5
Lillestrøm SK (Norway)	2–2 (4–5 p)	(Germany) Frankfurt	0–2	2–0 (a.e.t.)

11 November 2015
19:00

Twente (Netherlands)	0–1	(Spain) Barcelona
	Report	O. García 76'

De Grolsch Veste, Enschede
Attendance: 15,637
Referee: Pernilla Larsson (Sweden)
18 November 2015
19:00

Barcelona (Spain)	1–0	(Netherlands) Twente
O. García 25'	Report

Mini Estadi, Barcelona
Attendance: 3,219
Referee: Esther Staubli (Switzerland)

Barcelona won 2–0 on aggregate.

11 November 2015
20:30

Brescia (Italy)	1–0	(Denmark) Fortuna Hjørring
Sabatino 2'	Report

Stadio Mario Rigamonti, Brescia
Attendance: 1,832
Referee: Bibiana Steinhaus (Germany)
18 November 2015
19:00

Fortuna Hjørring (Denmark)	1–1	(Italy) Brescia
Nadim 58'	Report	Boattin 89'

Hjørring Stadium, Hjørring
Attendance: 1,046
Referee: Efthalia Mitsi (Greece)

Brescia won 2–1 on aggregate.

11 November 2015
20:00

Atlético Madrid (Spain)	1–3	(France) Lyon
Calderón 71'	Report	Nécib 22'; Hegerberg 45+1', 90+3'

Ciudad Deportiva Cerro del Espino, Majadahonda
Attendance: 2,546
Referee: Riem Hussein (Germany)
18 November 2015
18:00

Lyon (France)	6–0	(Spain) Atlético Madrid
Hegerberg 23', 57'; Schelin 25', 47'; Kumagai 45+1' (pen.); Thomis 72'	Report

Stade de Gerland, Lyon
Attendance: 6,549
Referee: Kateryna Monzul (Ukraine)

Lyon won 9–1 on aggregate.

12 November 2015
18:30

Slavia Praha (Czech Republic)	2–1	(Russia) Zvezda Perm
Divišová 5'; Necidová 54'	Report	Nahi 19'

Eden Arena, Prague
Attendance: 1,745
Referee: Esther Azzopardi (Malta)
19 November 2015
15:00

Zvezda Perm (Russia)	0–0	(Czech Republic) Slavia Praha
	Report

Zvezda Stadium, Perm
Attendance: 1,500
Referee: Morag Pirie (Scotland)

Slavia Praha won 2–1 on aggregate.

11 November 2015
20:00

Chelsea (England)	1–2	(Germany) Wolfsburg
Peter 54' (o.g.)	Report	C. Rafferty 3' (o.g.); Hansen 78'

Wheatsheaf Park, Staines-upon-Thames
Attendance: 1,610
Referee: Katalin Kulcsár (Hungary)
18 November 2015
16:00

Wolfsburg (Germany)	2–0	(England) Chelsea
Bernauer 12'; C. Rafferty 68' (o.g.)	Report

AOK Stadion, Wolfsburg
Attendance: 1,632
Referee: Sara Persson (Sweden)

Wolfsburg won 4–1 on aggregate.

11 November 2015
19:00

KIF Örebro (Sweden)	1–1	(France) Paris Saint-Germain
Talonen 3'	Report	Mittag 71'

Behrn Arena, Örebro
Attendance: 5,976
Referee: Carina Vitulano (Italy)
18 November 2015
20:00

Paris Saint-Germain (France)	0–0	(Sweden) KIF Örebro
	Report

Stade Sébastien Charléty, Paris
Attendance: 1,950
Referee: Sandra Bastos (Portugal)

1–1 on aggregate. Paris Saint-Germain won on away goals.

12 November 2015
20:30

AGSM Verona (Italy)	1–3	(Sweden) Rosengård
Pirone 30'	Report	Marta 6'; Carissimi 37' (o.g.); Gunnarsdóttir 77'

Stadio Marc'Antonio Bentegodi, Verona
Attendance: 2,700
Referee: Jana Adámková (Czech Republic)
19 November 2015
19:00

Rosengård (Sweden)	5–1	(Italy) AGSM Verona
Bélanger 38'; Marta 50', 67', 87'; Fuselli 65' (o.g.)	Report	Gabbiadini 20'

Malmö IP, Malmö
Attendance: 1,766
Referee: Teodora Albon (Romania)

Rosengård won 8–2 on aggregate.

11 November 2015
18:00

Lillestrøm SK (Norway)	0–2	(Germany) Frankfurt
	Report	Islacker 37'; Garefrekes 56'

Åråsen Stadion, Lillestrøm
Attendance: 1,112
Referee: Silvia Spinelli (Italy)
18 November 2015
18:00

Frankfurt (Germany)	0–2 (a.e.t.)	(Norway) Lillestrøm SK
	Report	Lundh 12'; Lund 70'
Penalties
Laudehr (penalty scored); Marozsán (penalty scored); Crnogorčević (penalty scored); Störzel (penalty scored); Islacker (penalty scored)	5–4	(penalty scored) Herlovsen; (penalty scored) Lund; (penalty scored) Van den Berg; (penalty scored) Sønstevold; (penalty missed) Spitse

Stadion am Brentanobad, Frankfurt
Attendance: 1,520
Referee: Gyöngyi Gaál (Hungary)

2–2 on aggregate. Frankfurt won 5–4 on penalties.

== Quarter-finals ==
The draws for the quarter-finals and semi-finals were held on 27 November 2015. The first legs were played on 23 March, and the second legs were played on 30 March 2016.

Team 1	Agg.	Team 2	1st leg	2nd leg
Wolfsburg (Germany)	6–0	(Italy) Brescia	3–0	3–0
Rosengård (Sweden)	1–1 (4–5 p)	(Germany) Frankfurt	0–1	1–0 (a.e.t.)
Lyon (France)	9–1	(Czech Republic) Slavia Praha	9–1	0–0
Barcelona (Spain)	0–1	(France) Paris Saint-Germain	0–0	0–1

23 March 2016
18:00

Wolfsburg (Germany)	3–0	(Italy) Brescia
Wullaert 32'; Popp 52'; Graham Hansen 61'	Report

AOK Stadion, Wolfsburg
Attendance: 1,549
Referee: Stéphanie Frappart (France)
30 March 2016
20:30

Brescia (Italy)	0–3	(Germany) Wolfsburg
	Report	Jakabfi 7', 33'; Bachmann 62'

Stadio Mario Rigamonti, Brescia
Attendance: 3,253
Referee: Olga Zadinová (Czech Republic)

Wolfsburg won 6–0 on aggregate.

23 March 2016
20:00

Rosengård (Sweden)	0–1	(Germany) Frankfurt
	Report	Marozsán 71' (pen.)

Malmö IP, Malmö
Attendance: 2,447
Referee: Cristina Dorcioman (Romania)
30 March 2016
18:00

Frankfurt (Germany)	0–1 (a.e.t.)	(Sweden) Rosengård
	Report	Gunnarsdóttir 28'
Penalties
Laudehr (penalty scored); Störzel (penalty scored); Islacker (penalty scored); Schmidt (penalty scored); Prießen (penalty scored)	5–4	(penalty missed) Gunnarsdóttir; (penalty scored) Andonova; (penalty scored) Marta; (penalty scored) Enganamouit; (penalty scored) Berglund

Stadion am Brentanobad, Frankfurt
Attendance: 3,220
Referee: Carina Vitulano (Italy)

1–1 on aggregate. Frankfurt won 5–4 on penalties.

23 March 2016
19:00

Lyon (France)	9–1	(Czech Republic) Slavia Praha
Nécib 18'; Le Sommer 24'; Hegerberg 35', 86'; Mbock Bathy 39', 53'; Majri 56'; Abily 64', 80'	Report	Svitková 42'

Parc Olympique Lyonnais, Lyon
Attendance: 11,732
Referee: Pernilla Larsson (Sweden)
30 March 2016
18:30

Slavia Praha (Czech Republic)	0–0	(France) Lyon
	Report

Eden Arena, Prague
Attendance: 2,838
Referee: Efthalia Mitsi (Greece)

Lyon won 9–1 on aggregate.

23 March 2016
18:30

Barcelona (Spain)	0–0	(France) Paris Saint-Germain
	Report

Mini Estadi, Barcelona
Attendance: 8,369
Referee: Katalin Kulcsár (Hungary)
30 March 2016
20:30

Paris Saint-Germain (France)	1–0	(Spain) Barcelona
Cristiane 86'	Report

Stade Sébastien Charléty, Paris
Attendance: 5,161
Referee: Riem Hussein (Germany)

Paris Saint-Germain won 1–0 on aggregate.

== Semi-finals ==
The first legs were played on 24 April, and the second legs were played on 1 and 2 May 2016.

Team 1	Agg.	Team 2	1st leg	2nd leg
Lyon (France)	8–0	(France) Paris Saint-Germain	7–0	1–0
Wolfsburg (Germany)	4–1	(Germany) Frankfurt	4–0	0–1

24 April 2016
15:00

Lyon (France)	7–0	(France) Paris Saint-Germain
Hegerberg 18', 40'; Le Sommer 28', 43'; Abily 45+1'; Nécib 73'; Schelin 76'	Report

Parc Olympique Lyonnais, Lyon
Attendance: 22,050
Referee: Bibiana Steinhaus (Germany)
2 May 2016
20:45

Paris Saint-Germain (France)	0–1	(France) Lyon
	Report	Schelin 44'

Parc des Princes, Paris
Attendance: 5,855
Referee: Esther Staubli (Switzerland)

Lyon won 8–0 on aggregate.

24 April 2016
19:15

Wolfsburg (Germany)	4–0	(Germany) Frankfurt
Kerschowski 7'; Popp 28'; Peter 42'; Bachmann 58'	Report

AOK Stadion, Wolfsburg
Attendance: 3,007
Referee: Teodora Albon (Romania)
1 May 2016
15:15

Frankfurt (Germany)	1–0	(Germany) Wolfsburg
Prießen 90'	Report

Stadion am Brentanobad, Frankfurt
Attendance: 3,720
Referee: Kateryna Monzul (Ukraine)

Wolfsburg won 4–1 on aggregate.

== Final ==
The final was played on 26 May 2016 at the Mapei Stadium – Città del Tricolore in Reggio Emilia, Italy.

26 May 2016
18:00

Wolfsburg (Germany)	1–1 (a.e.t.)	(France) Lyon
Popp 88'	Report	Hegerberg 12'
Penalties
Popp (penalty scored); Kerschowski (penalty scored); Peter (penalty scored); Fischer (penalty missed); Bussaglia (penalty missed)	3–4	(penalty missed) Hegerberg; (penalty scored) Schelin; (penalty scored) Renard; (penalty scored) Mbock; (penalty scored) Kumagai

Mapei Stadium – Città del Tricolore, Reggio Emilia
Attendance: 15,117
Referee: Katalin Kulcsár (Hungary)
