= 2015–16 in German football =

Football in Germany
- Season: 2015–16

Men's football
- Bundesliga: Bayern Munich
- 2. Bundesliga: SC Freiburg
- 3. Liga: Dynamo Dresden
- DFB-Pokal: Bayern Munich
- DFL-Supercup: VfL Wolfsburg

Women's football
- Frauen-Bundesliga: Bayern Munich
- DFB-Pokal: VfL Wolfsburg

The 2015–16 season was the 106th season of competitive football in Germany.

== Promotion and relegation ==
=== Pre–season ===
| League | Promoted to League | Relegated from League |
|---|---|---|
| Bundesliga | FC Ingolstadt; Darmstadt 98 | SC Freiburg; SC Paderborn |
| 2. Bundesliga | Arminia Bielefeld; MSV Duisburg | Erzgebirge Aue; VfR Aalen |
| 3. Liga | Werder Bremen II; 1. FC Magdeburg; Würzburger Kickers | Borussia Dortmund II; SpVgg Unterhaching; Jahn Regensburg |
| Bundesliga (women) | 1. FC Köln; Werder Bremen | MSV Duisburg; Herforder SV |
| 2. Bundesliga (women) | SV Henstedt-Ulzburg; Borussia Mönchengladbach; TSV Schott Mainz; Eintracht Wetzlar; BW Hohen Neuendorf | VfL Bochum; 1. FC Union Berlin; Magdeburger FFC; 1. FFC Montabaur; 1. FFC 08 Niederkirchen |

=== Post–season ===
| League | Promoted to League | Relegated from League |
|---|---|---|
| Bundesliga | SC Freiburg; RB Leipzig | VfB Stuttgart; Hannover 96 |
| 2. Bundesliga | Dynamo Dresden; Erzgebirge Aue; Würzburger Kickers | MSV Duisburg; FSV Frankfurt; SC Paderborn |
| 3. Liga | FSV Zwickau; Sportfreunde Lotte; Jahn Regensburg | Stuttgarter Kickers; Energie Cottbus; VfB Stuttgart II |
| Bundesliga (women) | MSV Duisburg; Borussia Mönchengladbach | Werder Bremen; 1. FC Köln |
| 2. Bundesliga (women) | Bramfelder SV; 1. FC Union Berlin; Arminia Bielefeld; 1. FFC 08 Niederkirchen; SC Sand II | ETSV Würzburg; Alemannia Aachen; Blau-Weiß Hohen Neuendorf; FFV Leipzig; Holstein Kiel |

== National teams ==
=== Germany national football team ===
==== UEFA Euro 2016 qualifying ====
===== UEFA Euro 2016 qualifying Group D table =====
| Pos | Team | Pld | W | D | L | GF | GA | GD | Pts | Qualification | (Germany) | (Poland) | (Republic of Ireland) | (Scotland) | (Georgia (country)) | (Gibraltar) |
|---|---|---|---|---|---|---|---|---|---|---|---|---|---|---|---|---|
| 1 | Germany | 10 | 7 | 1 | 2 | 24 | 9 | +15 | 22 | Qualify for final tournament | — | 3–1 | 1–1 | 2–1 | 2–1 | 4–0 |
| 2 | Poland | 10 | 6 | 3 | 1 | 33 | 10 | +23 | 21 | Qualify for final tournament | 2–0 | — | 2–1 | 2–2 | 4–0 | 8–1 |
| 3 | Republic of Ireland | 10 | 5 | 3 | 2 | 19 | 7 | +12 | 18 | Advance to play-offs | 1–0 | 1–1 | — | 1–1 | 1–0 | 7–0 |
| 4 | Scotland | 10 | 4 | 3 | 3 | 22 | 12 | +10 | 15 | | 2–3 | 2–2 | 1–0 | — | 1–0 | 6–1 |
| 5 | Georgia | 10 | 3 | 0 | 7 | 10 | 16 | −6 | 9 | | 0–2 | 0–4 | 1–2 | 1–0 | — | 4–0 |
| 6 | Gibraltar | 10 | 0 | 0 | 10 | 2 | 56 | −54 | 0 | | 0–7 | 0–7 | 0–4 | 0–6 | 0–3 | — |

Source: UEFA
Rules for classification: Qualification tiebreakers

===== UEFA Euro 2016 qualifying fixtures and results =====
Win Draw Loss

| 4 September 2015 UEFA Euro 2016 Q | Germany | 3–1 | Poland | Frankfurt, Germany |
| 20:45 CEST (UTC+02:00) | Müller 12'; Götze 19', 82' | Report | Lewandowski 36' | Stadium: Commerzbank-Arena; Attendance: 48,500; Referee: Nicola Rizzoli (Italy) |

| 7 September 2015 UEFA Euro 2016 Q | Scotland | 2–3 | Germany | Glasgow, Scotland |
| 19:45 BST (UTC+01:00) | Müller 18', 34'; Gündoğan 54' | Report | Hummels 28' (o.g.); McArthur 43' | Stadium: Hampden Park; Attendance: 50,753; Referee: Björn Kuipers (Netherlands) |

| 8 October 2015 UEFA Euro 2016 Q | Republic of Ireland | 1–0 | Germany | Dublin, Ireland |
| 20:45 CEST (UTC+02:00) | Long 70' | Report | | Stadium: Aviva Stadium; Attendance: 50,604; Referee: Carlos Velasco Carballo (Spain) |

| 11 October 2015 UEFA Euro 2016 Q | Germany | 2–1 | Georgia | Leipzig, Germany |
| 20:45 CEST (UTC+02:00) | Müller 50' (pen.); Kruse 79' | Report | Kankava 53' | Stadium: Red Bull Arena; Attendance: 43,630; Referee: Pavel Královec (Czech Republic) |

==== UEFA Euro 2016 ====
===== UEFA Euro 2016 Group C table =====
| Pos | Team | Pld | W | D | L | GF | GA | GD | Pts | Qualification |
|---|---|---|---|---|---|---|---|---|---|---|
| 1 | Germany | 3 | 2 | 1 | 0 | 3 | 0 | +3 | 7 (Note: Tied on head-to-head result (Germany 0–0 Poland). Overall goal difference was used as the tiebreaker.) | Advance to knockout stage |
| 2 | Poland | 3 | 2 | 1 | 0 | 2 | 0 | +2 | 7 | Advance to knockout stage |
| 3 | Northern Ireland | 3 | 1 | 0 | 2 | 2 | 2 | 0 | 3 | Advance to knockout stage |
| 4 | Ukraine | 3 | 0 | 0 | 3 | 0 | 5 | −5 | 0 | |

Source: UEFA
Rules for classification: Group stage tiebreakers

===== UEFA Euro 2016 fixtures and results =====
Win Draw Loss

| 12 June 2016 Group C | Germany | 2–0 | Ukraine | Lille, France |
| 21:00 CEST (UTC+02:00) | Mustafi 19'; Schweinsteiger 90+2' | DFB Report; UEFA Report | | Stadium: Stade Pierre-Mauroy; Attendance: 43,035; Referee: Martin Atkinson (England) |

| 16 June 2016 Group C | Germany | 0–0 | Poland | Saint-Denis, France |
| 21:00 CEST (UTC+02:00) | | DFB Report; UEFA Report | | Stadium: Stade de France; Attendance: 73,648; Referee: Björn Kuipers (Netherlands) |

| 21 June 2016 Group C | Northern Ireland | 0–1 | Germany | Paris, France |
| 21:00 CEST (UTC+02:00) | | DFB Report; UEFA Report | Gómez 30' | Stadium: Parc des Princes; Attendance: 44,125; Referee: Clément Turpin (France) |

| 26 June 2016 Round of 16 | Germany | 3–0 | Slovakia | Villeneuve d'Ascq, France |
| 18:00 CEST (UTC+02:00) | Boateng 8'; Gómez 43'; Draxler 63' | Report | | Stadium: Stade Pierre-Mauroy; Attendance: 44,312; Referee: Szymon Marciniak (Poland) |

| 2 July 2016 Quarter-final | Germany | 1–1 (a.e.t.) (6–5 p) | Italy | Bordeaux, France |
| 21:00 CEST (UTC+02:00) | Özil 65' | Report | Bonucci 78' (pen.) | Stadium: Nouveau Stade de Bordeaux; Attendance: 38,764; Referee: Viktor Kassai (Hungary) |
| | Penalties |
| | Kroos (penalty scored); Müller (penalty missed); Özil (penalty missed); Draxler (penalty scored); Schweinsteiger (penalty missed); Hummels (penalty scored); Kimmich (penalty scored); Boateng (penalty scored); Hector (penalty scored) | | (penalty scored) Insigne; (penalty missed) Zaza; (penalty scored) Barzagli; (penalty missed) Pellè; (penalty missed) Bonucci; (penalty scored) Giaccherini; (penalty scored) Parolo; (penalty scored) De Sciglio; (penalty missed) Darmian |

| 7 July 2016 Semi-final | Germany | 0–2 | France | Marseille, France |
| 21:00 CEST (UTC+02:00) | | Report | Griezmann 45+2' (pen.), 72' | Stadium: Stade Vélodrome; Referee: Nicola Rizzoli (Italy) |

==== Friendly matches ====
Win Draw Loss Void

| 13 November 2015 Friendly | France | 2–0 | Germany | Saint-Denis, France |
| 21:00 CET (UTC+01:00) | Giroud 45+1'; Gignac 86' | Report | | Stadium: Stade de France; Attendance: 65,000; Referee: Nicola Rizzoli (Italy) |

| 17 November 2015 Friendly | Germany | Cancelled | Netherlands | Hanover, Germany |
| 20:45 CET (UTC+01:00) | | Report | | Stadium: HDI-Arena; Attendance: 65,000; Referee: Viktor Kassai (Hungary) |
Note: The match was cancelled one hour before kick-off due to security issues.

| 26 March 2016 Friendly | Germany | 2–3 | England | Berlin, Germany |
| 20:45 CET (UTC+01:00) | Kroos 43'; Gómez 57' | Report | Kane 61'; Vardy 75'; Dier 90+1' | Stadium: Olympiastadion; Attendance: 71,413; Referee: Gianluca Rocchi (Italy) |

| 29 March 2016 Friendly | Germany | 4–1 | Italy | Munich, Germany |
| 20:45 CEST (UTC+02:00) | Kroos 24'; Götze 45'; Hector 59'; Özil 75' (pen.) | Report | El Shaarawy 83' | Stadium: Allianz Arena; Attendance: 62,653; Referee: Oliver Drachta (Austria) |

| 29 May 2016 Friendly | Germany | 1–3 | Slovakia | Augsburg, Germany |
| 17:45 CEST (UTC+02:00) | Gómez 13' (pen.) | Report | Hamšík 41'; Ďuriš 44'; Kucka 52' | Stadium: WWK Arena; Attendance: 22,110; Referee: Serge Gumienny (Belgium) |

| 4 June 2016 Friendly | Germany | 2–0 | Hungary | Gelsenkirchen, Germany |
| 18:00 CEST (UTC+02:00) | Lang 39' (o.g.); Müller 63' | Report | | Stadium: Veltins-Arena; Attendance: 52,104; Referee: Martin Strömbergsson (Sweden) |

=== Germany women's national football team ===
==== UEFA Women's Euro 2017 qualifying ====
| Pos | Team | Pld | W | D | L | GF | GA | GD | Pts | Qualification |
|---|---|---|---|---|---|---|---|---|---|---|
| 1 | Germany | 8 | 8 | 0 | 0 | 35 | 0 | +35 | 24 | Final tournament |
| 2 | Russia | 8 | 4 | 2 | 2 | 14 | 9 | +5 | 14 | Final tournament |
| 3 | Hungary | 8 | 2 | 2 | 4 | 8 | 20 | −12 | 8 | |
| 4 | Croatia | 8 | 2 | 1 | 5 | 8 | 15 | −7 | 7 | |
| 5 | Turkey | 8 | 1 | 1 | 6 | 3 | 24 | −21 | 4 | |

Source: UEFA
Rules for classification: Qualification tiebreakers

Win Draw Loss

| 18 September 2015 UEFA Women's Euro 2017 Q | Germany | 12–0 | Hungary | Halle (Saale), Germany |
| 16:00 CEST (UTC+02:00) | Popp 7', 66'; Maier 9'; Kemme 16'; Behringer 19' (pen.); Bremer 28', 70', 84'; Goeßling 33', 39'; Laudehr 63'; Leupolz 72' | Report | | Stadium: Erdgas Sportpark; Attendance: 4,378; Referee: Sara Persson (Sweden) |

| 22 September 2015 UEFA Women's Euro 2017 Q | Croatia | 0–1 | Germany | Zagreb, Croatia |
| 18:00 CEST (UTC+02:00) | | Report | Popp 7', 66' | Stadium: Stadion Kranjčevićeva; Attendance: 4,378; Referee: Sabine Bonnin (France) |

| 22 October 2015 UEFA Women's Euro 2017 Q | Germany | 2–0 | Russia | Wiesbaden, Germany |
| 16:00 CEST (UTC+02:00) | Islacker 8'; Maier 48' | Report | | Stadium: BRITA-Arena; Attendance: 4,516; Referee: Efthalia Mitsi (Greece) |

| 25 October 2015 UEFA Women's Euro 2017 Q | Germany | 7–0 | Turkey | Sandhausen, Germany |
| 14:15 CET (UTC+01:00) | Islacker 6'; Mittag 29'; Behringer 37' (pen.); Däbritz 69', 90+3'; Magull 78', 86' | Report | | Stadium: Hardtwaldstadion; Referee: Rhona Daly (Republic of Ireland) |

| 8 April 2016 UEFA Women's Euro 2017 Q | Turkey | 0–6 | Germany | Istanbul, Turkey |
| 17:00 TRT (UTC+03:00) | | Report | Kerschowski 29', 60', 90+3'; Mittag 40'; Popp 78', 86' | Stadium: Recep Tayyip Erdoğan Stadium; Referee: Florence Guillemin (France) |

| 12 April 2016 UEFA Women's Euro 2017 Q | Germany | 2–0 | Croatia | Osnabrück, Germany |
| 18:00 CEST (UTC+02:00) | Marozsán 32'; Mittag 50' | Report | | Stadium: Osnatel-Arena; Attendance: 8,276; Referee: Marte Sørø (Norway) |

==== 2016 SheBelieves Cup ====
| Pos | Team | Pld | W | D | L | GF | GA | GD | Pts |
|---|---|---|---|---|---|---|---|---|---|
| 1st place, gold medalist(s) | United States (H, C) | 3 | 3 | 0 | 0 | 4 | 1 | +3 | 9 |
| 2nd place, silver medalist(s) | Germany | 3 | 2 | 0 | 1 | 4 | 3 | +1 | 6 |
| 3rd place, bronze medalist(s) | England | 3 | 0 | 1 | 2 | 1 | 3 | −2 | 1 |
| 4 | France | 3 | 0 | 1 | 2 | 0 | 2 | −2 | 1 |

Source: US Soccer
Rules for classification: 1) points; 2) Goal difference; 3) Goals scored; 4) head-to-head points; 5) head-to-head goal difference; 6) head-to-head number of goals scored; 7) FIFA ranking.
(C) Champions; (H) Hosts

Win Draw Loss

| 3 March 2016 2016 SheBelieves Cup | Germany | 1–0 | France | Tampa |
| 17:00 (EST (UTC−5) | Maier 83' | Report | | Stadium: Raymond James Stadium; Referee: Melissa Borjas (Honduras) |

| 6 March 2016 2016 SheBelieves Cup | Germany | 2–1 | England | Nashville |
| 16:45 (CST (UTC−6) | Flaherty 76' (o.g.); Peter 82' (pen.) | Report | Duggan 9' | Stadium: Nissan Stadium; Attendance: 25,363; Referee: Katja Koroleva (United States) |

| 9 March 2016 2016 SheBelieves Cup | United States | 2–1 | Germany | Boca Raton |
| 19:45 (EST (UTC−5) | Morgan 37'; Mewis 42' | Report | Mittag 30' | Stadium: FAU Stadium; Attendance: 13,501; Referee: Carol Chenard (Canada) |

== League season ==
=== Men ===
==== Bundesliga ====
===== Bundesliga standings =====
| Pos | Team | Pld | W | D | L | GF | GA | GD | Pts | Qualification or relegation |
|---|---|---|---|---|---|---|---|---|---|---|
| 1 | Bayern Munich (C) | 34 | 28 | 4 | 2 | 80 | 17 | +63 | 88 | Qualification for the Champions League group stage |
| 2 | Borussia Dortmund | 34 | 24 | 6 | 4 | 82 | 34 | +48 | 78 | Qualification for the Champions League group stage |
| 3 | Bayer Leverkusen | 34 | 18 | 6 | 10 | 56 | 40 | +16 | 60 | Qualification for the Champions League group stage |
| 4 | Borussia Mönchengladbach | 34 | 17 | 4 | 13 | 67 | 50 | +17 | 55 | Qualification for the Champions League play-off round |
| 5 | Schalke 04 | 34 | 15 | 7 | 12 | 51 | 49 | +2 | 52 | Qualification for the Europa League group stage (Note: Since the winners of the 2015–16 DFB-Pokal, Bayern Munich, qualified for the Champions League based on league position, the Europa League group stage spot was passed to the sixth-placed team, Mainz 05; and the Europa League third qualifying round spot was passed to the seventh-placed team, Hertha BSC.) |
| 6 | Mainz 05 | 34 | 14 | 8 | 12 | 46 | 42 | +4 | 50 | Qualification for the Europa League group stage |
| 7 | Hertha BSC | 34 | 14 | 8 | 12 | 42 | 42 | 0 | 50 | Qualification for the Europa League third qualifying round |
| 8 | VfL Wolfsburg | 34 | 12 | 9 | 13 | 47 | 49 | −2 | 45 | |
| 9 | 1. FC Köln | 34 | 10 | 13 | 11 | 38 | 42 | −4 | 43 | |
| 10 | Hamburger SV | 34 | 11 | 8 | 15 | 40 | 46 | −6 | 41 | |
| 11 | FC Ingolstadt | 34 | 10 | 10 | 14 | 33 | 42 | −9 | 40 | |
| 12 | FC Augsburg | 34 | 9 | 11 | 14 | 42 | 52 | −10 | 38 | |
| 13 | Werder Bremen | 34 | 10 | 8 | 16 | 50 | 65 | −15 | 38 | |
| 14 | Darmstadt 98 | 34 | 9 | 11 | 14 | 38 | 53 | −15 | 38 | |
| 15 | 1899 Hoffenheim | 34 | 9 | 10 | 15 | 39 | 54 | −15 | 37 | |
| 16 | Eintracht Frankfurt (O) | 34 | 9 | 9 | 16 | 34 | 52 | −18 | 36 | Qualification for the relegation play-offs |
| 17 | VfB Stuttgart (R) | 34 | 9 | 6 | 19 | 50 | 75 | −25 | 33 | Relegation to 2. Bundesliga |
| 18 | Hannover 96 (R) | 34 | 7 | 4 | 23 | 31 | 62 | −31 | 25 | Relegation to 2. Bundesliga |

Source: DFB
Rules for classification: 1) Points; 2) Goal difference; 3) Goals scored; 4) Head-to-head points; 5) Head-to-head goal difference; 6) Head-to-head away goals scored; 7) Away goals scored; 8) Play-offs.
(C) Champions; (O) Play-off winners; (R) Relegated

==== 2. Bundesliga ====
===== 2. Bundesliga standings =====
| Pos | Team | Pld | W | D | L | GF | GA | GD | Pts | Promotion, qualification or relegation |
|---|---|---|---|---|---|---|---|---|---|---|
| 1 | SC Freiburg (C, P) | 34 | 22 | 6 | 6 | 75 | 39 | +36 | 72 | Promotion to Bundesliga |
| 2 | RB Leipzig (P) | 34 | 20 | 7 | 7 | 54 | 32 | +22 | 67 | Promotion to Bundesliga |
| 3 | 1. FC Nürnberg | 34 | 19 | 8 | 7 | 68 | 41 | +27 | 65 | Qualification to promotion play-offs |
| 4 | FC St. Pauli | 34 | 15 | 8 | 11 | 45 | 39 | +6 | 53 | |
| 5 | VfL Bochum | 34 | 13 | 12 | 9 | 56 | 40 | +16 | 51 | |
| 6 | Union Berlin | 34 | 13 | 10 | 11 | 56 | 50 | +6 | 49 | |
| 7 | Karlsruher SC | 34 | 12 | 11 | 11 | 35 | 37 | −2 | 47 | |
| 8 | Eintracht Braunschweig | 34 | 12 | 10 | 12 | 44 | 38 | +6 | 46 | |
| 9 | SpVgg Greuther Fürth | 34 | 13 | 7 | 14 | 49 | 55 | −6 | 46 | |
| 10 | 1. FC Kaiserslautern | 34 | 12 | 9 | 13 | 49 | 47 | +2 | 45 | |
| 11 | 1. FC Heidenheim | 34 | 11 | 12 | 11 | 42 | 40 | +2 | 45 | |
| 12 | Arminia Bielefeld | 34 | 8 | 18 | 8 | 38 | 39 | −1 | 42 | |
| 13 | SV Sandhausen (Note: SV Sandhausen were deducted three points for license violation.) | 34 | 12 | 7 | 15 | 40 | 50 | −10 | 40 | |
| 14 | Fortuna Düsseldorf | 34 | 9 | 8 | 17 | 32 | 47 | −15 | 35 | |
| 15 | 1860 Munich | 34 | 8 | 10 | 16 | 32 | 46 | −14 | 34 | |
| 16 | MSV Duisburg (R) | 34 | 7 | 11 | 16 | 32 | 54 | −22 | 32 | Qualification to relegation play-offs |
| 17 | FSV Frankfurt (R) | 34 | 8 | 8 | 18 | 33 | 59 | −26 | 32 | Relegation to 3. Liga |
| 18 | SC Paderborn (R) | 34 | 6 | 10 | 18 | 28 | 55 | −27 | 28 | Relegation to 3. Liga |

Source: DFB
Rules for classification: 1) Points; 2) Goal difference; 3) Goals scored
(C) Champions; (P) Promoted; (R) Relegated

==== 3. Liga ====
===== 3. Liga standings =====
| Pos | Team | Pld | W | D | L | GF | GA | GD | Pts | Promotion, qualification or relegation |
|---|---|---|---|---|---|---|---|---|---|---|
| 1 | Dynamo Dresden (C, P) | 38 | 21 | 15 | 2 | 75 | 35 | +40 | 78 | Promotion to 2. Bundesliga and qualification for DFB-Pokal |
| 2 | Erzgebirge Aue (P) | 38 | 19 | 13 | 6 | 42 | 21 | +21 | 70 | Promotion to 2. Bundesliga and qualification for DFB-Pokal |
| 3 | Würzburger Kickers (O, P) | 38 | 16 | 16 | 6 | 43 | 25 | +18 | 64 | Qualification for promotion play-offs and DFB-Pokal |
| 4 | 1. FC Magdeburg | 38 | 14 | 14 | 10 | 49 | 37 | +12 | 56 | Qualification for DFB-Pokal |
| 5 | VfL Osnabrück | 38 | 14 | 14 | 10 | 46 | 41 | +5 | 56 | |
| 6 | Chemnitzer FC | 38 | 15 | 10 | 13 | 52 | 46 | +6 | 55 | |
| 7 | Sonnenhof Großaspach | 38 | 14 | 12 | 12 | 58 | 47 | +11 | 54 | |
| 8 | Rot-Weiß Erfurt | 38 | 14 | 8 | 16 | 47 | 50 | −3 | 50 | |
| 9 | Preußen Münster | 38 | 12 | 13 | 13 | 43 | 41 | +2 | 49 | |
| 10 | Hansa Rostock | 38 | 12 | 13 | 13 | 42 | 48 | −6 | 49 | |
| 11 | Fortuna Köln | 38 | 14 | 7 | 17 | 56 | 69 | −13 | 49 | |
| 12 | Mainz 05 II (Note: Reserve teams are ineligible for promotion or DFB-Pokal qualification.) | 38 | 12 | 12 | 14 | 48 | 47 | +1 | 48 | |
| 13 | Hallescher FC | 38 | 13 | 9 | 16 | 48 | 48 | 0 | 48 | |
| 14 | Holstein Kiel | 38 | 12 | 12 | 14 | 44 | 47 | −3 | 48 | |
| 15 | VfR Aalen | 38 | 10 | 14 | 14 | 35 | 40 | −5 | 44 | |
| 16 | Wehen Wiesbaden | 38 | 9 | 16 | 13 | 35 | 48 | −13 | 43 | |
| 17 | Werder Bremen II | 38 | 11 | 10 | 17 | 42 | 56 | −14 | 43 | |
| 18 | Stuttgarter Kickers (R) | 38 | 11 | 10 | 17 | 38 | 52 | −14 | 43 | Relegation to Regionalliga |
| 19 | Energie Cottbus (R) | 38 | 9 | 14 | 15 | 32 | 52 | −20 | 41 | Relegation to Regionalliga |
| 20 | VfB Stuttgart II (R) | 38 | 7 | 10 | 21 | 38 | 63 | −25 | 31 | Relegation to Regionalliga |

Source: DFB
Rules for classification: 1) Points; 2) Goal difference; 3) Goals scored
(C) Champions; (O) Play-off winners; (P) Promoted; (R) Relegated

== German clubs in Europe ==
=== UEFA Champions League ===
==== Play-off round ====
| Team 1 | Agg. | Team 2 | 1st leg | 2nd leg |
|---|---|---|---|---|
| Lazio (Italy) | 1–3 | (Germany) Bayer Leverkusen | 1–0 | 0–3 |

==== Group stage ====
===== Group B =====
| Pos | Team | Pld | W | D | L | GF | GA | GD | Pts | Qualification | WOL | PSV | MUN | CSKA |
|---|---|---|---|---|---|---|---|---|---|---|---|---|---|---|
| 1 | (Germany) VfL Wolfsburg | 6 | 4 | 0 | 2 | 9 | 6 | +3 | 12 | Advance to knockout phase | — | 2–0 | 3–2 | 1–0 |
| 2 | (Netherlands) PSV Eindhoven | 6 | 3 | 1 | 2 | 8 | 7 | +1 | 10 | Advance to knockout phase | 2–0 | — | 2–1 | 2–1 |
| 3 | (England) Manchester United | 6 | 2 | 2 | 2 | 7 | 7 | 0 | 8 | Transfer to Europa League | 2–1 | 0–0 | — | 1–0 |
| 4 | (Russia) CSKA Moscow | 6 | 1 | 1 | 4 | 5 | 9 | −4 | 4 | | 0–2 | 3–2 | 1–1 | — |

Source: UEFA

===== Group D =====
| Pos | Team | Pld | W | D | L | GF | GA | GD | Pts | Qualification | MCI | JUV | SEV | BMG |
|---|---|---|---|---|---|---|---|---|---|---|---|---|---|---|
| 1 | (England) Manchester City | 6 | 4 | 0 | 2 | 12 | 8 | +4 | 12 | Advance to knockout phase | — | 1–2 | 2–1 | 4–2 |
| 2 | (Italy) Juventus | 6 | 3 | 2 | 1 | 6 | 3 | +3 | 11 | Advance to knockout phase | 1–0 | — | 2–0 | 0–0 |
| 3 | (Spain) Sevilla | 6 | 2 | 0 | 4 | 8 | 11 | −3 | 6 | Transfer to Europa League | 1–3 | 1–0 | — | 3–0 |
| 4 | (Germany) Borussia Mönchengladbach | 6 | 1 | 2 | 3 | 8 | 12 | −4 | 5 | | 1–2 | 1–1 | 4–2 | — |

Source: UEFA

===== Group E =====
| Pos | Team | Pld | W | D | L | GF | GA | GD | Pts | Qualification | BAR | ROM | LEV | BATE |
|---|---|---|---|---|---|---|---|---|---|---|---|---|---|---|
| 1 | (Spain) Barcelona | 6 | 4 | 2 | 0 | 15 | 4 | +11 | 14 | Advance to knockout phase | — | 6–1 | 2–1 | 3–0 |
| 2 | (Italy) Roma | 6 | 1 | 3 | 2 | 11 | 16 | −5 | 6 | Advance to knockout phase | 1–1 | — | 3–2 | 0–0 |
| 3 | (Germany) Bayer Leverkusen | 6 | 1 | 3 | 2 | 13 | 12 | +1 | 6 | Transfer to Europa League | 1–1 | 4–4 | — | 4–1 |
| 4 | (Belarus) BATE Borisov | 6 | 1 | 2 | 3 | 5 | 12 | −7 | 5 | | 0–2 | 3–2 | 1–1 | — |

Source: UEFA

===== Group F =====
| Pos | Team | Pld | W | D | L | GF | GA | GD | Pts | Qualification | BAY | ARS | OLY | DZG |
|---|---|---|---|---|---|---|---|---|---|---|---|---|---|---|
| 1 | (Germany) Bayern Munich | 6 | 5 | 0 | 1 | 19 | 3 | +16 | 15 | Advance to knockout phase | — | 5–1 | 4–0 | 5–0 |
| 2 | (England) Arsenal | 6 | 3 | 0 | 3 | 12 | 10 | +2 | 9 | Advance to knockout phase | 2–0 | — | 2–3 | 3–0 |
| 3 | (Greece) Olympiacos | 6 | 3 | 0 | 3 | 6 | 13 | −7 | 9 | Transfer to Europa League | 0–3 | 0–3 | — | 2–1 |
| 4 | (Croatia) Dinamo Zagreb | 6 | 1 | 0 | 5 | 3 | 14 | −11 | 3 | | 0–2 | 2–1 | 0–1 | — |

Source: UEFA

==== Knockout phase ====
===== Round of 16 =====
| Team 1 | Agg. | Team 2 | 1st leg | 2nd leg |
|---|---|---|---|---|
| Gent (Belgium) | 2–4 | (Germany) Wolfsburg | 2–3 | 0–1 |
| Juventus (Italy) | 4–6 | (Germany) Bayern Munich | 2–2 | 2–4 (a.e.t.) |

===== Quarter-finals =====
| Team 1 | Agg. | Team 2 | 1st leg | 2nd leg |
|---|---|---|---|---|
| Wolfsburg (Germany) | 2–3 | (Spain) Real Madrid | 2–0 | 0–3 |
| Bayern Munich (Germany) | 3–2 | (Portugal) Benfica | 1–0 | 2–2 |

===== Semi-finals =====
| Team 1 | Agg. | Team 2 | 1st leg | 2nd leg |
|---|---|---|---|---|
| Atlético Madrid (Spain) | 2–2 (a) | (Germany) Bayern Munich | 1–0 | 1–2 |

=== UEFA Europa League ===
==== Qualifying phase ====
===== Third qualifying round =====
| Team 1 | Agg. | Team 2 | 1st leg | 2nd leg |
|---|---|---|---|---|
| Wolfsberger AC (Austria) | 0–6 | (Germany) Borussia Dortmund | 0–1 | 0–5 |

===== Play-off round =====
| Team 1 | Agg. | Team 2 | 1st leg | 2nd leg |
|---|---|---|---|---|
| Odd (Norway) | 5–11 | (Germany) Borussia Dortmund | 3–4 | 2–7 |

==== Group stage ====
===== Group C =====
| Pos | Team | Pld | W | D | L | GF | GA | GD | Pts | Qualification | KRA | DOR | PAOK | QAB |
|---|---|---|---|---|---|---|---|---|---|---|---|---|---|---|
| 1 | (Russia) Krasnodar | 6 | 4 | 1 | 1 | 9 | 4 | +5 | 13 | Advance to knockout phase | — | 1–0 | 2–1 | 2–1 |
| 2 | (Germany) Borussia Dortmund | 6 | 3 | 1 | 2 | 10 | 5 | +5 | 10 | Advance to knockout phase | 2–1 | — | 0–1 | 4–0 |
| 3 | (Greece) PAOK | 6 | 1 | 4 | 1 | 3 | 3 | 0 | 7 | | 0–0 | 1–1 | — | 0–0 |
| 4 | (Azerbaijan) Gabala | 6 | 0 | 2 | 4 | 2 | 12 | −10 | 2 | | 0–3 | 1–3 | 0–0 | — |

Source: Soccerway

===== Group K =====
| Pos | Team | Pld | W | D | L | GF | GA | GD | Pts | Qualification | SCH | SPP | AT | APO |
|---|---|---|---|---|---|---|---|---|---|---|---|---|---|---|
| 1 | (Germany) Schalke 04 | 6 | 4 | 2 | 0 | 15 | 3 | +12 | 14 | Advance to knockout phase | — | 2–2 | 4–0 | 1–0 |
| 2 | (Czech Republic) Sparta Prague | 6 | 3 | 3 | 0 | 10 | 5 | +5 | 12 | Advance to knockout phase | 1–1 | — | 1–0 | 2–0 |
| 3 | (Greece) Asteras Tripolis | 6 | 1 | 1 | 4 | 4 | 12 | −8 | 4 | | 0–4 | 1–1 | — | 2–0 |
| 4 | (Cyprus) APOEL | 6 | 1 | 0 | 5 | 3 | 12 | −9 | 3 | | 0–3 | 1–3 | 2–1 | — |

Source: Soccerway

===== Group L =====
| Pos | Team | Pld | W | D | L | GF | GA | GD | Pts | Qualification | ATH | AUG | PAR | AZ |
|---|---|---|---|---|---|---|---|---|---|---|---|---|---|---|
| 1 | (Spain) Athletic Bilbao | 6 | 4 | 1 | 1 | 16 | 8 | +8 | 13 | Advance to knockout phase | — | 3–1 | 5–1 | 2–2 |
| 2 | (Germany) FC Augsburg | 6 | 3 | 0 | 3 | 12 | 11 | +1 | 9 | Advance to knockout phase | 2–3 | — | 1–3 | 4–1 |
| 3 | (Serbia) Partizan | 6 | 3 | 0 | 3 | 10 | 14 | −4 | 9 | | 0–2 | 1–3 | — | 3–2 |
| 4 | (Netherlands) AZ | 6 | 1 | 1 | 4 | 8 | 13 | −5 | 4 | | 2–1 | 0–1 | 1–2 | — |

Source: Soccerway

==== Knockout phase ====
===== Round of 32 =====
| Team 1 | Agg. | Team 2 | 1st leg | 2nd leg |
|---|---|---|---|---|
| Borussia Dortmund (Germany) | 3–0 | (Portugal) Porto | 2–0 | 1–0 |
| Augsburg (Germany) | 0–1 | (England) Liverpool | 0–0 | 0–1 |
| Shakhtar Donetsk (Ukraine) | 3–0 | (Germany) Schalke 04 | 0–0 | 3–0 |
| Sporting CP (Portugal) | 1–4 | (Germany) Bayer Leverkusen | 0–1 | 1–3 |

===== Round of 16 =====
| Team 1 | Agg. | Team 2 | 1st leg | 2nd leg |
|---|---|---|---|---|
| Villarreal (Spain) | 2–0 | (Germany) Bayer Leverkusen | 2–0 | 0–0 |
| Borussia Dortmund (Germany) | 5–1 | (England) Tottenham Hotspur | 3–0 | 2–1 |

===== Quarter-finals =====
| Team 1 | Agg. | Team 2 | 1st leg | 2nd leg |
|---|---|---|---|---|
| Borussia Dortmund (Germany) | 4–5 | (England) Liverpool | 1–1 | 3–4 |

=== UEFA Women's Champions League ===
==== Round of 32 ====
| Team 1 | Agg. | Team 2 | 1st leg | 2nd leg |
|---|---|---|---|---|
| Standard Liège (Belgium) | 0–8 | (Germany) Frankfurt | 0–2 | 0–6 |
| Twente (Netherlands) | 3–3 (a) | (Germany) Bayern Munich | 1–1 | 2–2 |
| Spartak Subotica (Serbia) | 0–4 | (Germany) Wolfsburg | 0–0 | 0–4 |

==== Round of 16 ====
| Team 1 | Agg. | Team 2 | 1st leg | 2nd leg |
|---|---|---|---|---|
| Chelsea (England) | 1–4 | (Germany) Wolfsburg | 1–2 | 0–2 |
| Lillestrøm SK (Norway) | 2–2 (4–5 p) | (Germany) Frankfurt | 0–2 | 2–0 (a.e.t.) |

==== Quarter-finals ====
| Team 1 | Agg. | Team 2 | 1st leg | 2nd leg |
|---|---|---|---|---|
| Wolfsburg (Germany) | 6–0 | (Italy) Brescia | 3–0 | 3–0 |
| Rosengård (Sweden) | 1–1 (4–5 p) | (Germany) Frankfurt | 0–1 | 1–0 (a.e.t.) |

==== Semi-finals ====
| Team 1 | Agg. | Team 2 | 1st leg | 2nd leg |
|---|---|---|---|---|
| Wolfsburg (Germany) | 4–1 | (Germany) Frankfurt | 4–0 | 0–1 |

==== Final ====
26 May 2016
18:00 UTC+2

| Wolfsburg (Germany) | 1–1 (a.e.t.) | (France) Lyon |
|---|---|---|
| Popp 88' | Report | Hegerberg 12' |
Penalties
| Popp (penalty scored); Kerschowski (penalty scored); Peter (penalty scored); Fischer (penalty missed); Bussaglia (penalty missed) | 3–4 | (penalty missed) Hegerberg; (penalty scored) Schelin; (penalty scored) Renard; (penalty scored) Mbock; (penalty scored) Kumagai |

Mapei Stadium – Città del Tricolore, Reggio Emilia
Attendance: 15,117
Referee: Katalin Kulcsár (Hungary)
