= 2015–16 UEFA Women's Champions League =

15th edition of the European women's club football championship organized by UEFA

Tournament details
- Dates: Qualifying round: 11–16 August 2015; Knockout phase: 7 October 2015 – 26 May 2016
- Teams: Knockout phase: 32; Total: 56 (from 47 associations)

Final positions
- Champions: (France) Lyon (3rd title)
- Runners-up: (Germany) Wolfsburg

Tournament statistics
- Matches played: 109
- Goals scored: 421 (3.86 per match)
- Attendance: 208,892 (1,916 per match)
- Top scorer(s): (Norway) Ada Hegerberg; 13 goals

The 2015–16 UEFA Women's Champions League was the 15th edition of the European women's club football championship organised by UEFA, and the 7th edition since being rebranded as the UEFA Women's Champions League.

The final was played at the Mapei Stadium – Città del Tricolore in Reggio Emilia, Italy on 26 May 2016, two days before the final of the men's tournament played at San Siro, Milan.

Lyon defeated Wolfsburg 4–3 on penalties (1–1 after extra time) to win their third European title. Frankfurt were the defending champions, but were eliminated by Wolfsburg in the semi-finals.

== Association team allocation ==
A total of 56 teams from 47 of the 54 UEFA member associations participated in the 2015–16 UEFA Women's Champions League. The ranking based on the UEFA Women's Champions League association coefficient was used to determine the number of participating teams for each association:

- Associations 1–8 each had two teams qualify.
- All other associations, should they enter, each had one team qualify.
- The winners of the 2014–15 UEFA Women's Champions League were given an additional entry if they do not qualify for the 2015–16 UEFA Women's Champions League through their domestic league. Because Frankfurt finished outside the top two league places, this additional entry was necessary, meaning Germany had three teams in the competition this season.

=== Association ranking ===
For the 2015–16 UEFA Women's Champions League, the associations were allocated places according to their 2014 UEFA Women's Champions League association coefficient, which took into account their performance in European competitions from 2009–10 to 2013–14.

Spain overtook the Czech Republic in the UEFA coefficient ranking and thus assured themselves a second entry.

Rank	Association	Coeff.	Teams
1	Germany	91.666	2+1(TH)
2	France	78.500	2
3	Sweden	61.500	2
4	England	58.500	2
5	Russia	47.000	2
6	Italy	39.500	2
7	Spain	35.000	2
8	Denmark	35.000	2
9	(Czech Republic) Czech Republic	34.000	1
10	Austria	31.500	1
11	Norway	30.000	1
12	Scotland	22.000	1
13	Switzerland	20.000	1
14	Belgium	19.000	1
15	Kazakhstan	19.000	1
16	Poland	18.500	1
17	Netherlands	18.000	1
18	Iceland	17.000	1

Rank	Association	Coeff.	Teams
19	Cyprus	16.000	1
20	Serbia	15.000	1
21	Finland	15.000	1
22	Hungary	14.500	1
23	Romania	14.000	1
24	Belarus	12.500	1
25	Greece	12.500	1
26	Ukraine	12.000	1
27	Turkey	10.000	1
28	(Bosnia and Herzegovina) Bosnia and Herzegovina	10.000	1
29	Portugal	8.500	1
30	Slovakia	8.000	1
31	Israel	8.000	1
32	(Republic of Ireland) Republic of Ireland	8.000	1
33	Slovenia	7.500	1
34	Bulgaria	7.500	1
35	Estonia	5.000	1
36	Croatia	5.000	1

Rank	Association	Coeff.	Teams
37	(Faroe Islands) Faroe Islands	5.000	1
38	Lithuania	4.000	1
39	(North Macedonia) Macedonia	3.000	1
40	Wales	3.000	1
41	(Northern Ireland) Northern Ireland	2.000	1
42	Montenegro	1.000	1
43	Moldova	0.500	1
44	Luxembourg	0.000	1
45	(Georgia (country)) Georgia	0.000	0 (DNE)
46	Latvia	0.000	1
47	Malta	0.000	1
48	Albania	0.000	1
(NR)	Andorra	0.000	0 (DNE)
(NR)	Armenia	0.000	0 (DNE)
(NR)	Azerbaijan	0.000	0 (DNE)
(NR)	Gibraltar	0.000	0 (DNE)
(NR)	Liechtenstein	0.000	0 (DNE)
(NR)	(San Marino) San Marino	0.000	0 (DNE)

Notes

- (TH) – Additional berth for title holders
- (DNE) – Did not enter
- (NR) – No rank (association did not enter in the five seasons used for computing coefficients)

=== Teams ===
Unlike the men's Champions League, not every association enters a team, and so the exact number of teams in each round can not be determined until the full entry list is known. For this season, the title holders, the champions and runners-up from associations 1–8 and the champions from associations 9–15 entered the round of 32, while the remaining teams entered the qualifying round.

The following list the teams that qualified and enter this season's competition. Here TH denotes the title holders, CH denotes the national champion, RU the national runner-up, Ned 1 and Bel 1 the best placed Belgian and Dutch team in their joint league. Gibraltar's champions were still ineligible, as the 2014–15 national league season was again played with only nine players per side. After some years of hiatus Georgia played out a national champion in 2014. For the first time in 12 years Neulengbach from Austria missed out on qualification. Luxembourg entered a team for the competition for the first time since the 2011–12 season. Faroese club KÍ had entered every past edition.

Round of 32
(Germany) Frankfurt (TH)	(Germany) Bayern Munich (CH)	(Germany) Wolfsburg (RU)	(France) Lyon (CH)
(France) Paris Saint-Germain (RU)	(Sweden) Rosengård (CH)	(Sweden) KIF Örebro (RU)	(England) Liverpool (CH)
(England) Chelsea (RU)	(Russia) Zvezda Perm (CH)	(Russia) Zorky Krasnogorsk (RU)	(Italy) AGSM Verona (CH)
(Italy) Brescia (RU)	(Spain) Barcelona (CH)	(Spain) Atlético Madrid (RU)	(Denmark) Brøndby (CH)
(Denmark) Fortuna Hjørring (RU)	(Czech Republic) Slavia Praha (CH)	(Austria) St. Pölten-Spratzern (CH)	(Norway) Lillestrøm SK (CH)
(Scotland) Glasgow City (CH)	(Switzerland) Zürich (CH)	(Belgium) Standard Liège (Bel 1)	(Kazakhstan) BIIK Kazygurt (CH)
Qualifying round
(Poland) Medyk Konin (CH)	(Netherlands) Twente (Ned 1)	(Iceland) Stjarnan (CH)	(Cyprus) Apollon Limassol (CH)
(Finland) PK-35 Vantaa (CH)	(Hungary) Ferencváros (CH)	(Serbia) Spartak Subotica (CH)	(Romania) Olimpia Cluj (CH)
(Belarus) FC Minsk (CH)	(Ukraine) Zhytlobud-1 Kharkiv (CH)	(Greece) PAOK (CH)	(Turkey) Konak Belediyespor (CH)
(Bosnia and Herzegovina) SFK 2000 (CH)	(Portugal) CF Benfica (CH)	(Slovakia) Nové Zámky (CH)	(Israel) ASA Tel Aviv (CH)
(Republic of Ireland) Wexford Youths (CH)	(Slovenia) Pomurje (CH)	(Bulgaria) NSA Sofia (CH)	(Estonia) Pärnu JK (CH)
(Croatia) ŽNK Osijek (CH)	(Faroe Islands) KÍ Klaksvík (CH)	(Lithuania) Gintra Universitetas (CH)	(North Macedonia) ŽFK Dragon 2014 (CH)
(Wales) Cardiff Met. (CH)	(Northern Ireland) Glentoran Belfast United (CH)	(Montenegro) Ekonomist (CH)	(Moldova) Noroc Nimoreni (CH)
(Malta) Hibernians (CH)	(Latvia) Rīgas FS (CH)	(Albania) Vllaznia (CH)	(Luxembourg) Jeunesse Junglinster (CH)

== Round and draw dates ==
The schedule of the competition was as follows (all draws were held at the UEFA headquarters in Nyon, Switzerland). In contrast to previous seasons, the round of 16 draw was held after the round of 32 was completed (separately from the round of 32 draw) and was seeded. Moreover, the quarter-finals were now moved back to be played in midweek, with only the semi-finals played on weekends.

Round	Draw	First leg	Second leg
Qualifying round	25 June 2015	11–16 August 2015	
Round of 32	20 August 2015	7–8 October 2015	14–15 October 2015
Round of 16	19 October 2015	11–12 November 2015	18–19 November 2015
Quarter-finals	27 November 2015	23–24 March 2016	30–31 March 2016
Semi-finals	27 November 2015	23–24 April 2016	30 April–1 May 2016
Final	27 November 2015	26 May 2016 at Mapei Stadium – Città del Tricolore, Reggio Emilia	

== Qualifying round ==
The draw for the qualifying round was held on 25 June 2015. The 32 teams were allocated into four seeding positions based on their 2015 UEFA club coefficients, which took into account their performance in European competitions from 2010–11 to 2014–15 plus 33% of their association coefficient from the same time span. They were drawn into eight groups of four (one from each seeding position), with the restriction that each group had to contain one of the eight teams which were pre-selected as hosts (which were allocated their own designated pot).

In each group, teams played against each other in a round-robin mini-tournament at the pre-selected hosts. The eight group winners advanced to the round of 32. The matchdays were 11, 13 and 16 August 2015.

Tiebreakers
The teams are ranked according to points (3 points for a win, 1 point for a draw, 0 points for a loss). If two or more teams are equal on points on completion of the group matches, the following criteria are applied in the order given to determine the rankings (regulations Articles 14.01 and 14.02):
1. higher number of points obtained in the group matches played among the teams in question;
2. superior goal difference from the group matches played among the teams in question;
3. higher number of goals scored in the group matches played among the teams in question;
4. if, after having applied criteria 1 to 3, teams still have an equal ranking, criteria 1 to 3 are reapplied exclusively to the matches between the teams in question to determine their final rankings. If this procedure does not lead to a decision, criteria 5 to 9 apply;
5. superior goal difference in all group matches;
6. higher number of goals scored in all group matches;
7. if only two teams have the same number of points, and they are tied according to criteria 1 to 6 after having met in the last round of the group, their ranking is determined by a penalty shoot-out (this criterion is not used if more than two teams have the same number of points, or if the rankings of the two teams are not relevant for which team qualifies for the next stage).
8. lower disciplinary points total based only on yellow and red cards received in all group matches (red card = 3 points, yellow card = 1 point, expulsion for two yellow cards in one match = 3 points);
9. higher club coefficient.

=== Group 1 ===
Pos	Team	Pld	W	D	L	GF	GA	GD	Pts	Qualification	MIN	SFK	KON	VLL
1	(Belarus) FC Minsk	3	3	0	0	16	1	+15	9	Advanced to knockout phase	—	3–0	—	—
2	(Bosnia and Herzegovina) SFK 2000 (H)	3	2	0	1	8	4	+4	6		—	—	3–1	5–0
3	(Turkey) Konak Belediyespor	3	1	0	2	7	14	−7	3		1–10	—	—	5–1
4	(Albania) Vllaznia	3	0	0	3	1	13	−12	0		0–3	—	—	—

Source: UEFA
(H) Hosts

=== Group 2 ===
Pos	Team	Pld	W	D	L	GF	GA	GD	Pts	Qualification	PAO	SOF	GLE	DRA
1	(Greece) PAOK	3	3	0	0	18	0	+18	9	Advanced to knockout phase	—	—	4–0	10–0
2	(Bulgaria) NSA Sofia	3	2	0	1	8	5	+3	6		0–4	—	—	6–0
3	(Northern Ireland) Glentoran Belfast United (H)	3	1	0	2	3	6	−3	3		—	1–2	—	—
4	(North Macedonia) ŽFK Dragon 2014	3	0	0	3	0	18	−18	0		—	—	0–2	—

Source: UEFA
(H) Hosts

=== Group 3 ===
Pos	Team	Pld	W	D	L	GF	GA	GD	Pts	Qualification	STJ	APO	KLA	HIB
1	(Iceland) Stjarnan	3	3	0	0	11	0	+11	9	Advanced to knockout phase	—	2–0	—	5–0
2	(Cyprus) Apollon Limassol (H)	3	2	0	1	10	2	+8	6		—	—	2–0	8–0
3	(Faroe Islands) KÍ Klaksvík	3	0	1	2	3	9	−6	1		0–4	—	—	—
4	(Malta) Hibernians	3	0	1	2	3	16	−13	1		—	—	3–3	—

Source: UEFA
(H) Hosts

=== Group 4 ===
Pos	Team	Pld	W	D	L	GF	GA	GD	Pts	Qualification	TWE	FER	TLV	JUN
1	(Netherlands) Twente (H)	3	3	0	0	19	0	+19	9	Advanced to knockout phase	—	2–0	—	10–0
2	(Hungary) Ferencváros	3	2	0	1	13	3	+10	6		—	—	2–1	—
3	(Israel) ASA Tel Aviv	3	1	0	2	6	10	−4	3		0–7	—	—	5–1
4	(Luxembourg) Jeunesse Junglinster	3	0	0	3	1	26	−25	0		—	0–11	—	—

Source: UEFA
(H) Hosts

=== Group 5 ===
Pos	Team	Pld	W	D	L	GF	GA	GD	Pts	Qualification	CLU	POM	PÄR	EKO
1	(Romania) Olimpia Cluj	3	3	0	0	12	1	+11	9	Advanced to knockout phase	—	—	4–0	6–1
2	(Slovenia) Pomurje (H)	3	2	0	1	6	3	+3	6		0–2	—	—	4–0
3	(Estonia) Pärnu JK	3	1	0	2	3	7	−4	3		—	1–2	—	—
4	(Montenegro) Ekonomist	3	0	0	3	2	12	−10	0		—	—	1–2	—

Source: UEFA
(H) Hosts

=== Group 6 ===
Pos	Team	Pld	W	D	L	GF	GA	GD	Pts	Qualification	SUB	BEN	OSI	NOR
1	(Serbia) Spartak Subotica	3	3	0	0	9	2	+7	9	Advanced to knockout phase	—	2–1	—	4–1
2	(Portugal) CF Benfica	3	2	0	1	7	2	+5	6		—	—	3–0	—
3	(Croatia) ŽNK Osijek (H)	3	1	0	2	4	6	−2	3		0–3	—	—	4–0
4	(Moldova) Noroc Nimoreni	3	0	0	3	1	11	−10	0		—	0–3	—	—

Source: UEFA
(H) Hosts

=== Group 7 ===
Pos	Team	Pld	W	D	L	GF	GA	GD	Pts	Qualification	MED	WEX	GIN	CAR
1	(Poland) Medyk Konin (H)	3	3	0	0	15	0	+15	9	Advanced to knockout phase	—	—	4–0	5–0
2	(Republic of Ireland) Wexford Youths	3	2	0	1	6	7	−1	6		0–6	—	—	—
3	(Lithuania) Gintra Universitetas	3	1	0	2	5	6	−1	3		—	0–1	—	5–1
4	(Wales) Cardiff Met.	3	0	0	3	2	15	−13	0		—	1–5	—	—

Source: UEFA
(H) Hosts

=== Group 8 ===
Pos	Team	Pld	W	D	L	GF	GA	GD	Pts	Qualification	VAN	KHA	RIG	NZK
1	(Finland) PK-35 Vantaa (H)	3	3	0	0	20	1	+19	9	Advanced to knockout phase	—	—	9–0	9–0
2	(Ukraine) Zhytlobud-1 Kharkiv	3	2	0	1	10	3	+7	6		1–2	—	4–1	—
3	(Latvia) Rīgas FS	3	1	0	2	4	15	−11	3		—	—	—	3–2
4	(Slovakia) Nové Zámky	3	0	0	3	2	17	−15	0		—	0–5	—	—

Source: UEFA
(H) Hosts

== Knockout phase ==
In the knockout phase, teams played against each other over two legs on a home-and-away basis, except for the one-match final. The mechanism of the draws for each round was as follows:

- In the draw for the round of 32, the sixteen teams with the highest UEFA coefficients were seeded (with the title holders being the automatic top seed), and the other sixteen teams were unseeded. The seeded teams were drawn against the unseeded teams, with the seeded teams hosting the second leg. Teams from the same association could not be drawn against each other.
- In the draw for the round of 16, the eight teams with the highest UEFA coefficients were seeded (with the title holders being the automatic top seed should they qualify), and the other eight teams were unseeded. The seeded teams were drawn against the unseeded teams, with the seeded teams hosting the second leg. Teams from the same association could not be drawn against each other.
- In the draws for the quarter-finals onwards, there were no seedings, and teams from the same association could be drawn against each other.

=== Bracket ===
Round of 32
(England) Chelsea	1	3	4
(Scotland) Glasgow City	0	0	0
(Serbia) Spartak Subotica	0	0	0
(Germany) Wolfsburg	0	4	4
(Italy) Brescia	1	1	2
(England) Liverpool	0	0	0
(Belarus) FC Minsk	0	0	0
(Denmark) Fortuna Hjørring	2	4	6
(Norway) Lillestrøm SK	1	1	2
(Switzerland) Zürich	0	1	1
(Belgium) Standard Liège	0	0	0
(Germany) Frankfurt	2	6	8
(Italy) AGSM Verona	5	2	7
(Austria) St. Pölten-Spratzern	4	2	6
(Finland) PK-35 Vantaa	0	0	0
(Sweden) Rosengård	2	7	9
(Spain) Atlético Madrid	0	3	3
(Russia) Zorky Krasnogorsk	2	0	2
(Poland) Medyk Konin	0	0	0
(France) Lyon	6	3	9
(Czech Republic) Slavia Praha	4	0	4
(Denmark) Brøndby	1	1	2
(Russia) Zvezda Perm	3	3	6
(Iceland) Stjarnan	1	1	2
(Germany) Bayern Munich	1	2	3
(Netherlands) Twente (a)	1	2	3
(Kazakhstan) BIIK Kazygurt	1	1	2
(Spain) Barcelona	1	4	5
(Greece) PAOK	0	0	0
(Sweden) KIF Örebro	3	5	8
(Romania) Olimpia Cluj	0	0	0
(France) Paris Saint-Germain	6	9	15

Round of 16
(England) Chelsea	1	0	1
(Germany) Wolfsburg	2	2	4
(Italy) Brescia	1	1	2
(Denmark) Fortuna Hjørring	0	1	1
(Norway) Lillestrøm SK	0	2	2
(Germany) Frankfurt (p)	2	0	2
(Italy) AGSM Verona	1	1	2
(Sweden) Rosengård	3	5	8
(Spain) Atlético Madrid	1	0	1
(France) Lyon	3	6	9
(Czech Republic) Slavia Praha	2	0	2
(Russia) Zvezda Perm	1	0	1
(Netherlands) Twente	0	0	0
(Spain) Barcelona	1	1	2
(Sweden) KIF Örebro	1	0	1
(France) Paris Saint-Germain (a)	1	0	1

Quarter-finals
(Germany) Wolfsburg	3	3	6
(Italy) Brescia	0	0	0
(Germany) Frankfurt (p)	1	0	1
(Sweden) Rosengård	0	1	1
(France) Lyon	9	0	9
(Czech Republic) Slavia Praha	1	0	1
(Spain) Barcelona	0	0	0
(France) Paris Saint-Germain	0	1	1

Semi-finals
(Germany) Wolfsburg	4	0	4
(Germany) Frankfurt	0	1	1
(France) Lyon	7	1	8
(France) Paris Saint-Germain	0	0	0

Final
(Germany) Wolfsburg	1
(France) Lyon (p)	1

=== Round of 32 ===
The draw for the round of 32 was held on 20 August 2015. The first legs were played on 7 and 8 October, and the second legs were played on 14 and 15 October 2015.

Team 1	Agg.	Team 2	1st leg	2nd leg
BIIK Kazygurt (Kazakhstan)	2–5	(Spain) Barcelona	1–1	1–4
Medyk Konin (Poland)	0–9	(France) Lyon	0–6	0–3
Olimpia Cluj (Romania)	0–15	(France) Paris Saint-Germain	0–6	0–9
Slavia Praha (Czech Republic)	4–2	(Denmark) Brøndby	4–1	0–1
Standard Liège (Belgium)	0–8	(Germany) Frankfurt	0–2	0–6
PAOK (Greece)	0–8	(Sweden) KIF Örebro	0–3	0–5
Twente (Netherlands)	3–3 (a)	(Germany) Bayern Munich	1–1	2–2
Atlético Madrid (Spain)	3–2	(Russia) Zorky Krasnogorsk	0–2	3–0
St. Pölten-Spratzern (Austria)	6–7	(Italy) AGSM Verona	4–5	2–2
Stjarnan (Iceland)	2–6	(Russia) Zvezda Perm	1–3	1–3
Lillestrøm SK (Norway)	2–1	(Switzerland) Zürich	1–0	1–1 (a.e.t.)
Chelsea (England)	4–0	(Scotland) Glasgow City	1–0	3–0
PK-35 Vantaa (Finland)	0–9	(Sweden) Rosengård	0–2	0–7
FC Minsk (Belarus)	0–6	(Denmark) Fortuna Hjørring	0–2	0–4
Spartak Subotica (Serbia)	0–4	(Germany) Wolfsburg	0–0	0–4
Brescia (Italy)	2–0	(England) Liverpool	1–0	1–0

=== Round of 16 ===
The draw for the round of 16 was held on 19 October 2015. The first legs were played on 11 and 12 November, and the second legs were played on 18 and 19 November 2015.

Team 1	Agg.	Team 2	1st leg	2nd leg
Twente (Netherlands)	0–2	(Spain) Barcelona	0–1	0–1
Brescia (Italy)	2–1	(Denmark) Fortuna Hjørring	1–0	1–1
Atlético Madrid (Spain)	1–9	(France) Lyon	1–3	0–6
Slavia Praha (Czech Republic)	2–1	(Russia) Zvezda Perm	2–1	0–0
Chelsea (England)	1–4	(Germany) Wolfsburg	1–2	0–2
KIF Örebro (Sweden)	1–1 (a)	(France) Paris Saint-Germain	1–1	0–0
AGSM Verona (Italy)	2–8	(Sweden) Rosengård	1–3	1–5
Lillestrøm SK (Norway)	2–2 (4–5 p)	(Germany) Frankfurt	0–2	2–0 (a.e.t.)

=== Quarter-finals ===
The draws for the quarter-finals and semi-finals were held on 27 November 2015. The first legs were played on 23 March, and the second legs were played on 30 March 2016.

Team 1	Agg.	Team 2	1st leg	2nd leg
Wolfsburg (Germany)	6–0	(Italy) Brescia	3–0	3–0
Rosengård (Sweden)	1–1 (4–5 p)	(Germany) Frankfurt	0–1	1–0 (a.e.t.)
Lyon (France)	9–1	(Czech Republic) Slavia Praha	9–1	0–0
Barcelona (Spain)	0–1	(France) Paris Saint-Germain	0–0	0–1

=== Semi-finals ===
The first legs were played on 24 April, and the second legs were played on 1 and 2 May 2016.

Team 1	Agg.	Team 2	1st leg	2nd leg
Lyon (France)	8–0	(France) Paris Saint-Germain	7–0	1–0
Wolfsburg (Germany)	4–1	(Germany) Frankfurt	4–0	0–1

=== Final ===
The final was played on 26 May 2016 at the Mapei Stadium – Città del Tricolore in Reggio Emilia, Italy. The "home" team (for administrative purposes) was determined by an additional draw held after the quarter-final and semi-final draws.

26 May 2016
18:00 UTC+2

Wolfsburg (Germany)	1–1 (a.e.t.)	(France) Lyon
Popp 88'	Report	Hegerberg 12'
Penalties
Popp (penalty scored); Kerschowski (penalty scored); Peter (penalty scored); Fischer (penalty missed); Bussaglia (penalty missed)	3–4	(penalty missed) Hegerberg; (penalty scored) Schelin; (penalty scored) Renard; (penalty scored) Mbock; (penalty scored) Kumagai

Mapei Stadium – Città del Tricolore, Reggio Emilia
Attendance: 15,117
Referee: Katalin Kulcsár (Hungary)

== Statistics ==
Statistics include qualifying rounds.

=== Top goalscorers ===
Rank	Player	Team	Goals		
Rank	Player	Team	Qual	Tourn	Total
1	(Norway) Ada Hegerberg	(France) Lyon	—	13	13
2	(Nigeria) Ebere Orji	(Hungary) Ferencváros	9	—	9
3	(Netherlands) Jill Roord	(Netherlands) Twente	7	1	8
4	(Nigeria) Uchechi Sunday	(Belarus) FC Minsk	7	0	7
5	(Brazil) Cristiane	(France) Paris Saint-Germain	—	6	6
5	(Poland) Aleksandra Sikora	(Poland) Medyk Konin	6	0	6
7	(Montenegro) Jasna Djoković	(Bosnia and Herzegovina) SFK 2000	5	—	5
7	(France) Eugénie Le Sommer	(France) Lyon	—	5	5
7	(Brazil) Marta	(Sweden) Rosengård	—	5	5
7	(Brazil) Poliana	(Iceland) Stjarnan	5	0	5
7	(Finland) Sanna Saarinen	(Finland) PK-35 Vantaa	5	0	5

Source: UEFA

=== Squad of the season ===
The UEFA technical study group selected the following 18 players as the squad of the tournament:

Pos.	Player	Team
GK	(France) Sarah Bouhaddi	(France) Lyon
GK	(Spain) Sandra Paños	(Spain) Barcelona
DF	(Sweden) Emma Berglund	(Sweden) Rosengård
DF	(France) Wendie Renard	(France) Lyon
DF	(France) Amel Majri	(France) Lyon
DF	(France) Griedge Mbock Bathy	(France) Lyon
DF	(Sweden) Nilla Fischer	(Germany) Wolfsburg
DF	(Germany) Pauline Bremer	(France) Lyon
MF	(Germany) Simone Laudehr	(Germany) Frankfurt
MF	(Japan) Saki Kumagai	(France) Lyon
MF	(France) Camille Abily	(France) Lyon
MF	(Costa Rica) Shirley Cruz	(France) Paris Saint-Germain
MF	(France) Louisa Nécib	(France) Lyon
MF	(Germany) Lena Goeßling	(Germany) Wolfsburg
FW	(Germany) Dzsenifer Marozsán	(Germany) Frankfurt
FW	(France) Eugénie Le Sommer	(France) Lyon
FW	(Norway) Ada Hegerberg	(France) Lyon
FW	(Brazil) Cristiane	(France) Paris Saint-Germain

== See also ==
- 2015–16 UEFA Champions League
