= 2016 UEFA Women's Champions League final =

2016 UEFA Women's Champions League Final
- Event: 2015–16 UEFA Women's Champions League
Wolfsburg	Lyon
(Germany)	(France)
1	1
- After extra time Lyon won 4–3 on penalties
- Date: 26 May 2016
- Venue: Mapei Stadium – Città del Tricolore, Reggio Emilia
- Referee: Katalin Kulcsár (Hungary)
- Attendance: 15,117

The 2016 UEFA Women's Champions League Final was the final match of the 2015–16 UEFA Women's Champions League, the 15th season of Europe's premier women's club football tournament organised by UEFA, and the seventh season since it was renamed from the UEFA Women's Cup to the UEFA Women's Champions League. It was played at the Mapei Stadium – Città del Tricolore stadium in Reggio Emilia, Italy, on 26 May 2016, between German team Wolfsburg and French team Lyon.

Lyon defeated Wolfsburg 4–3 on penalties (1–1 after extra time) to win their third European title.

== Background ==
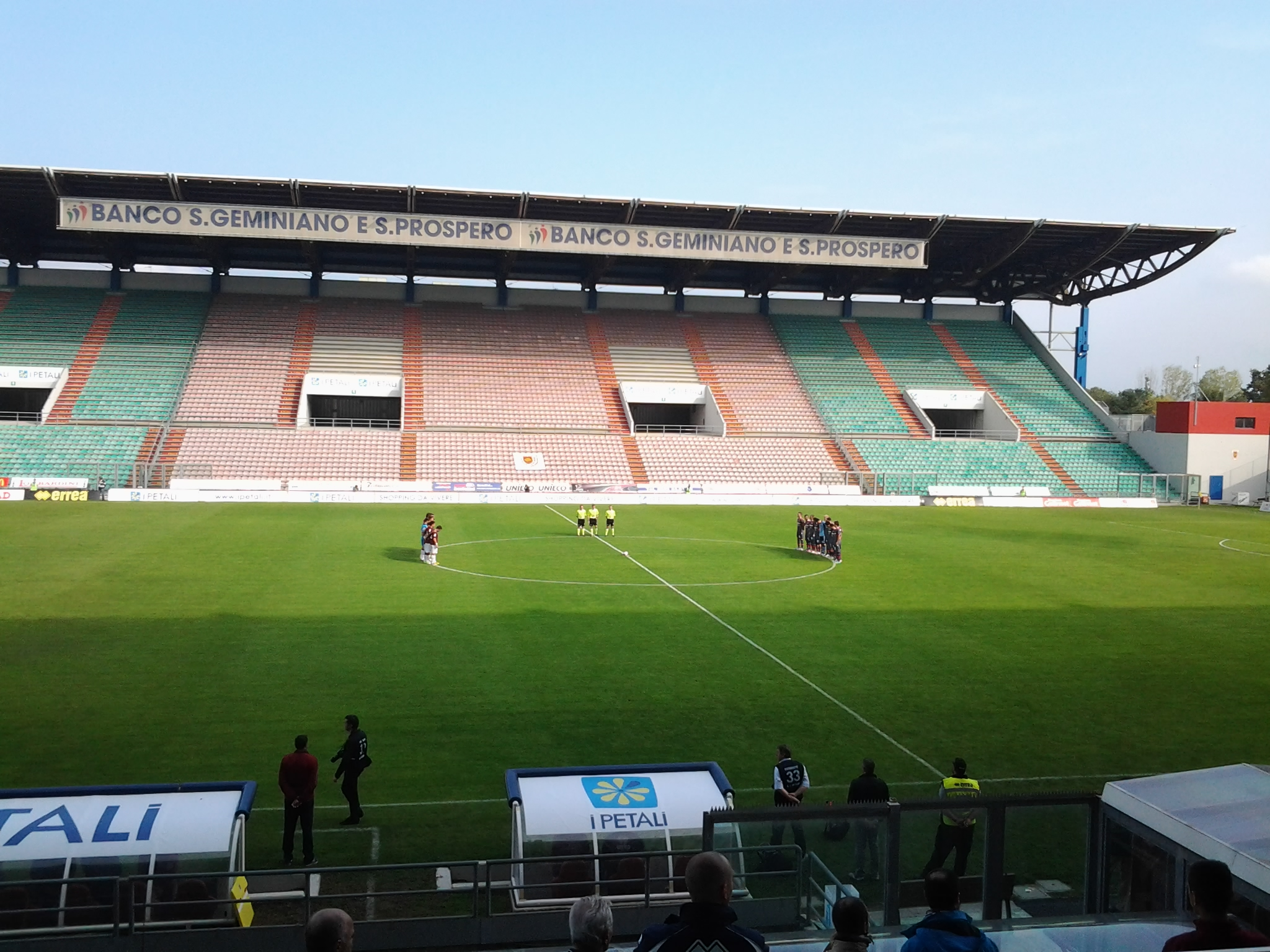
Mapei Stadium – Città del Tricolore in Reggio Emilia, Italy, hosted the match.

The final was a rematch of the 2013 final, won by Wolfsburg 1–0. This was the ninth successive final with at least one German team, and the sixth final in seven years between a French team and a German team.

Both teams had won the tournament twice. Wolfsburg won successive finals in 2013 and 2014, while Lyon reached four successive finals, winning in 2011 and 2012, but losing in 2010 and 2013, all facing German opponents.

== Route to the final ==
Note: In all results below, the score of the finalist is given first (H: home; A: away).

(Germany) Wolfsburg				Round	(France) Lyon			
Opponent	Agg.	1st leg	2nd leg	Knockout phase	Opponent	Agg.	1st leg	2nd leg
(Serbia) Spartak Subotica	4–0	0–0 (A)	4–0 (H)	Round of 32	(Poland) Medyk Konin	9–0	6–0 (A)	3–0 (H)
(England) Chelsea	4–1	2–1 (A)	2–0 (H)	Round of 16	(Spain) Atlético Madrid	9–1	3–1 (A)	6–0 (H)
(Italy) Brescia	6–0	3–0 (H)	3–0 (A)	Quarter-finals	(Czech Republic) Slavia Praha	9–1	9–1 (H)	0–0 (A)
(Germany) Frankfurt	4–1	4–0 (H)	0–1 (A)	Semi-finals	(France) Paris Saint-Germain	8–0	7–0 (H)	1–0 (A)

== Match ==
=== Officials ===
Hungarian referee Katalin Kulcsár was announced as the final referee by UEFA on 10 May 2016.

=== Details ===
The "home" team (for administrative purposes) was determined by an additional draw held after the quarter-final and semi-final draws, which was held on 27 November 2015 at UEFA headquarters in Nyon, Switzerland.

26 May 2016
18:00 UTC+2

Wolfsburg (Germany)	1–1 (a.e.t.)	(France) Lyon
Popp 88'	Report	Hegerberg 12'
Penalties
Popp (penalty scored); Kerschowski (penalty scored); Peter (penalty scored); Fischer (penalty missed); Bussaglia (penalty missed)	3–4	(penalty missed) Hegerberg; (penalty scored) Schelin; (penalty scored) Renard; (penalty scored) Mbock; (penalty scored) Kumagai

Mapei Stadium – Città del Tricolore, Reggio Emilia
Attendance: 15,117
Referee: Katalin Kulcsár (Hungary)

Wolfsburg	Lyon

GK	1	(Germany) Almuth Schult
RB	8	(Germany) Babett Peter
CB	4	(Sweden) Nilla Fischer (c)
CB	28	(Germany) Lena Goeßling
LB	21	(Switzerland) Lara Dickenmann
CM	18	(Switzerland) Vanessa Bernauer	(substituted off) 73'
CM	30	(France) Élise Bussaglia
RW	9	(Germany) Anna Blässe	(substituted off) 113'
LW	27	(Germany) Isabel Kerschowski
CF	11	(Germany) Alexandra Popp
CF	3	(Hungary) Zsanett Jakabfi	(substituted off) 59'
Substitutes:
GK	29	(Germany) Merle Frohms
DF	2	(Germany) Luisa Wensing
DF	20	(Germany) Stephanie Bunte	(substituted on) 113'
DF	24	(Germany) Joelle Wedemeyer
FW	10	(Belgium) Tessa Wullaert	(substituted on) 73'
FW	19	(Switzerland) Ramona Bachmann	(substituted on) 59'
FW	17	(Poland) Ewa Pajor
Manager:
(Germany) Ralf Kellermann

GK	16	(France) Sarah Bouhaddi
RB	22	(Germany) Pauline Bremer		(substituted off) 86'
CB	29	(France) Griedge Mbock Bathy
CB	3	(France) Wendie Renard (c)
LB	7	(France) Amel Majri
CM	6	(France) Amandine Henry
CM	5	(Japan) Saki Kumagai	(yellow card) 44'
RW	9	(France) Eugénie Le Sommer		(substituted off) 79'
AM	23	(France) Camille Abily	(yellow card) 101'
LW	10	(France) Louisa Nécib	(yellow card) 22'
CF	14	(Norway) Ada Hegerberg
Substitutes:
GK	30	(France) Méline Gérard
DF	17	(France) Corine Petit
DF	19	(France) Ève Périsset
FW	8	(Sweden) Lotta Schelin		(substituted on) 79'
FW	12	(France) Élodie Thomis		(substituted on) 86'
FW	20	(France) Delphine Cascarino
FW	24	(France) Mylaine Tarrieu
Manager:
(France) Gérard Prêcheur

Player of the Match:
Saki Kumagai (Lyon)

Assistant referees:
Judit Kulcsár (Hungary)
Andrea Hima (Hungary)
Fourth official:
Gyöngyi Gaál (Hungary)
Reserve official:
Lucia Abruzzese (Italy)

Match rules

- 90 minutes.
- 30 minutes of extra time if necessary.
- Penalty shoot-out if scores still level.
- Seven named substitutes, of which up to three may be used.

=== Statistics ===
Statistic	Lyon	VfL Wolfsburg
Goals scored	1	1
Total shots	18	9
Shots on target	9	3
Saves	2	2
Ball possession	52	48
Corner kicks	8	5
Fouls committed	11	6
Offsides	7	0
Yellow cards	3	0
Red cards	0	0

== See also ==
- 2016 UEFA Champions League Final
- 2016 UEFA Europa League final
- Played between same clubs:
- 2013 UEFA Women's Champions League final
- 2018 UEFA Women's Champions League final
- 2020 UEFA Women's Champions League final
