= Marina Pettersson-Engström =

Swedish footballer

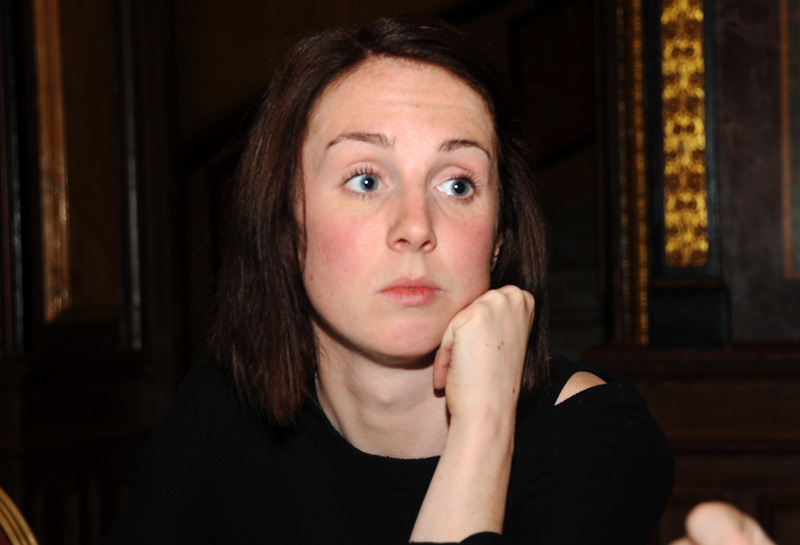

Personal information
- Full name: Marina Pettersson-Engström
- Date of birth: 21 September 1987 (age 39)
- Place of birth: Örebro, Sweden
- Height: 1.73 m (5 ft 8 in)
- Position: Defender

Youth career
- 2002: IK Sturehov

Senior career*
Years	Team	Apps	(Gls)
2003–2004	IFK Kumla		
2005–2015	KIF Örebro DFF	210	(13)
2017	KIF Örebro DFF	22	(0)

International career^{‡}
2011–2014	Sweden	3	(0)
- * Club domestic league appearances and goals as of 09:57, 8 December 2018 (UTC) ‡ National team caps and goals as of 01:44, 17 February 2016 (UTC)

Marina Pettersson-Engström (born 21 September 1987) is a Swedish footballer. She played as a centre back for Damallsvenskan club KIF Örebro DFF and the Sweden women's national football team. After eleven seasons playing for KIF Örebro, she retired shortly after the conclusion of the 2015 season. Following the birth of her child she agreed a return to Örebro ahead of the 2017 season.

== International career ==
Pettersson-Engström made her debut for the senior Sweden team in a 2–1 loss to Canada on 22 November 2011. She had been drafted into the squad as a replacement for the injured Caroline Seger.
