= Marith Prießen =

German footballer (born 1990)

Marith Müller-Prießen
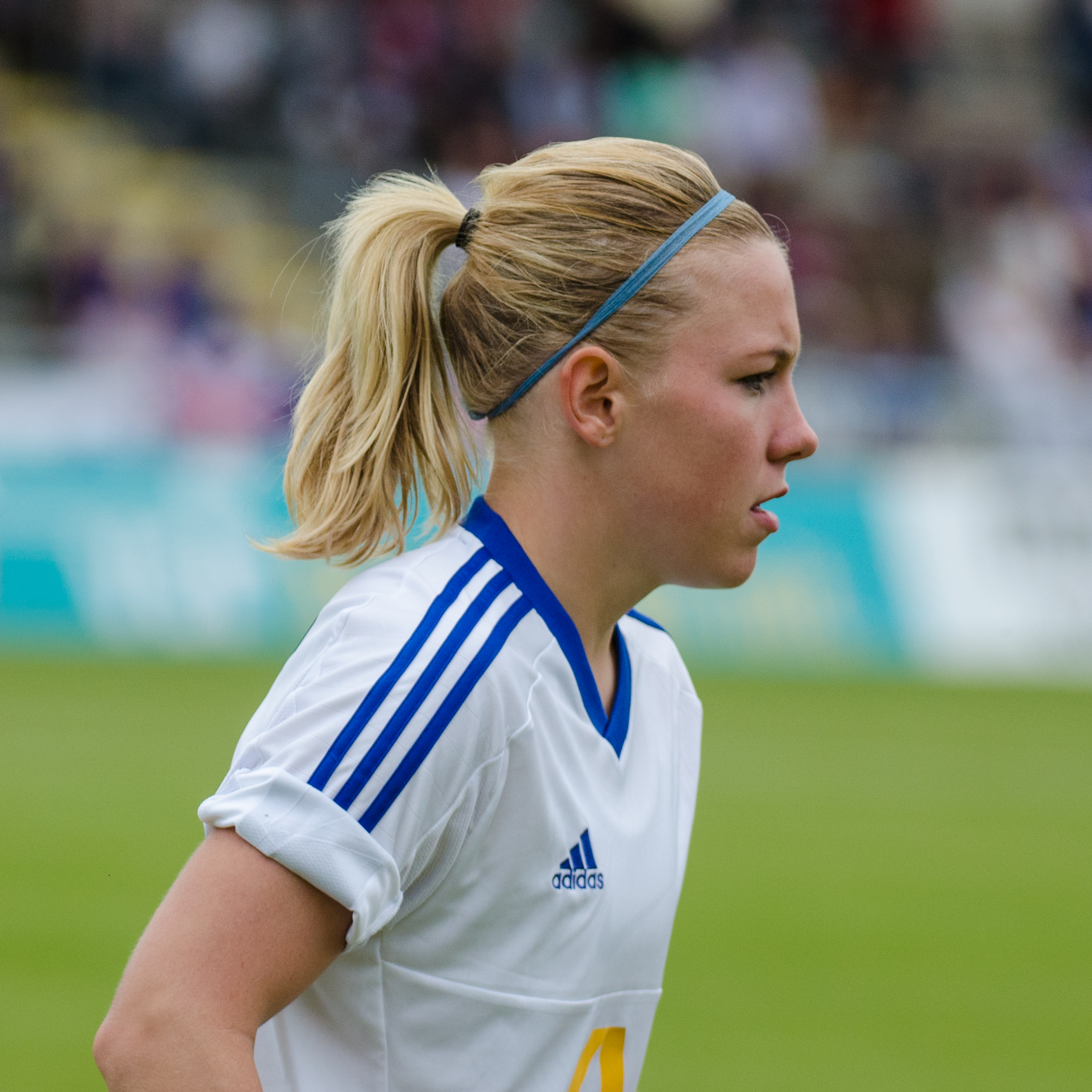

Personal information
- Full name: Marith Kristin Müller-Prießen
- Birth name: Marith Kristin Prießen
- Date of birth: 17 December 1990 (age 35)
- Place of birth: Kempen, Germany
- Height: 1.70 m (5 ft 7 in)
- Position: Centre back

Youth career
- –2003: TSV Wachtendonk/Wankum
- 2003–2005: SV Walbeck
- 2005–2007: FCR 2001 Duisburg

Senior career*
Years	Team	Apps	(Gls)
2007–2010	FCR 2001 Duisburg	32	(0)
2010–2014	Bayer Leverkusen	86	(5)
2014–2019	FFC Frankfurt	97	(6)
2019–2020	Paris FC	16	(0)
2020–2022	1. FC Köln	22	(0)

International career^{‡}
2006–2007	Germany U17	16	(1)
2007	Germany U19	8	(0)
2007–2010	Germany U20	13	(0)
2007	Germany U23	2	(0)
- * Club domestic league appearances and goals as of 31 October 2019 ‡ National team caps and goals as of 24 November 2016

Marith Kristin Müller-Prießen (née Prießen; born 17 December 1990) is a German footballer.

== Honours ==
FCR 2001 Duisburg

- Bundesliga: Runner-up (3) 2006–07, 2007–08, 2009–10
- German Cup: 2008–09, 2009–10; Runner-up (1) 2006–07
- UEFA Women's Champions League: 2008–09

1. FFC Frankfurt

- UEFA Women's Champions League: 2014–15

Germany U20

- FIFA U-20 World Cup: 2010
