= Maud Roetgering =

Dutch footballer (born 1992)

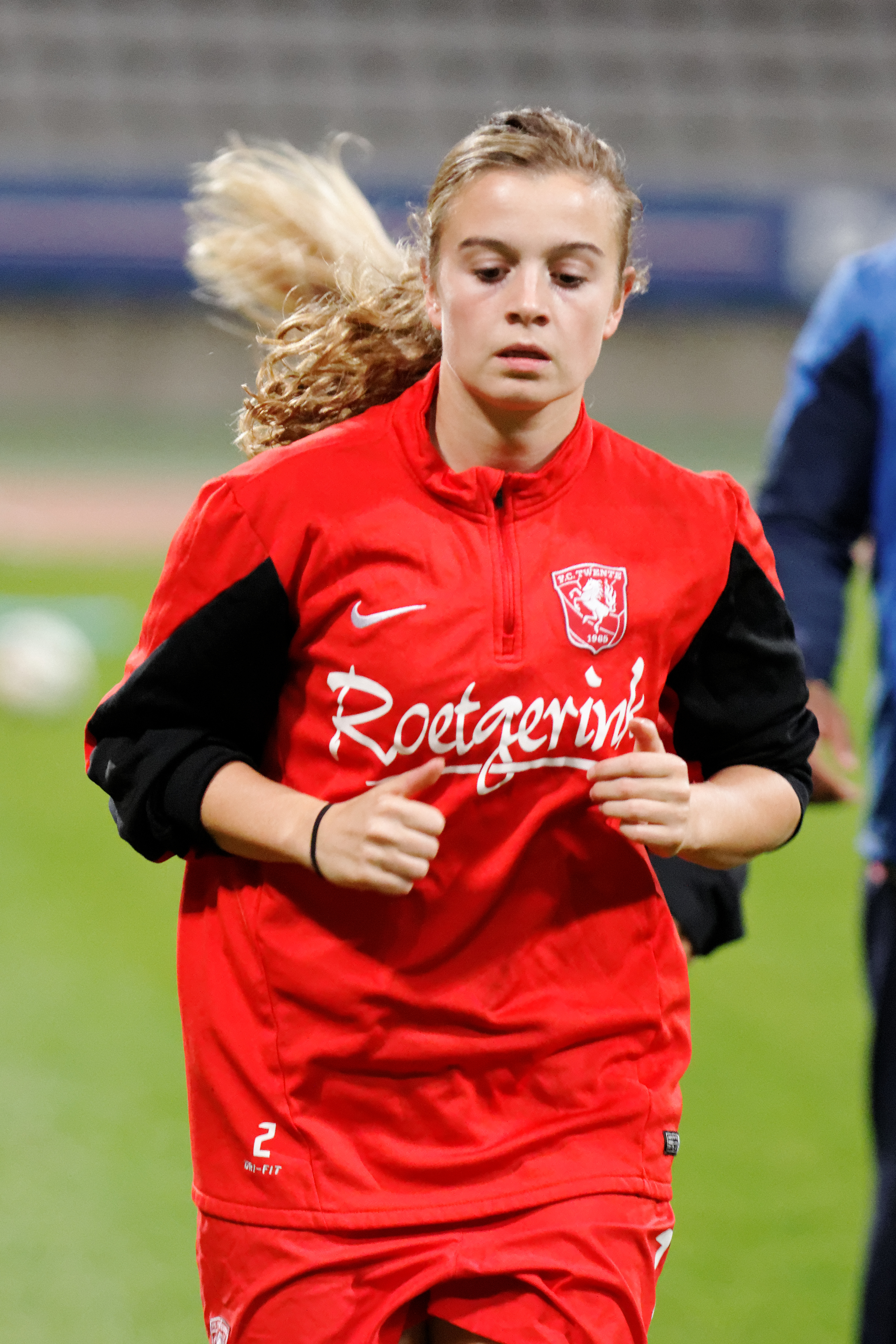
- Roetgering with Twente in 2014

Personal information
- Full name: Maud Engelina Maria Roetgering
- Date of birth: 31 July 1992 (age 34)
- Place of birth: Almelo, Netherlands
- Position: Right-back

Youth career
- SV Enter
- 2007–2009: Twente

Senior career*
Years	Team	Apps	(Gls)
2009–2020	Twente	193	(10)
2022–2023	Twente	10	(0)
Total		203	(10)

International career
2009	Netherlands U17	3	(0)
2010–2011	Netherlands U19	8	(0)
- * Club domestic league appearances and goals

Maud Engelina Maria Roetgering (born 31 July 1992) is a Dutch former footballer who played as a defender. She spent her entire club career at Eredivisie club Twente. She has also represented Netherlands at youth international level.

== Club career ==
Roetgering first sport was volleyball, it was only when she was around ten years old that she started playing football at amateur club SV Enter. In 2007 she arrived at FC Twente and during her first year, she was combining training at both clubs and playing during the weekends for SV Enter but due to the training at FC Twente her level rapidly improved and she left SV Enter.

At FC Twente she progressed through the youth teams and in 2009 came to the first team. With the club she competed in the Eredivisie (Dutch League), BeNe League (Belgian and Dutch leagues combined League from 2012 to 2015), KNVB Women's Cup (Dutch Cup), BeNe Super Cup (Belgian and Dutch Cup, from 2011 to 2012) and the UEFA Women's Champions League.

== International career ==
She has played in the youth Dutch national teams (Under-17 and Under-19), taking part in the 2011 U-19 European Championship.

She has been also selected for the national senior team to participate at trainings and compose the squad, but is yet to make her debut.

== Honours ==
FC Twente

- BeNe League (2): 2012–13, 2013–14
- Eredivisie (8): 2010–11, 2012–13*, 2013–14*, 2014–15*, 2015–16, 2018–19, 2020–21, 2021–22
- KNVB Women's Cup (1): 2014–15

*During the BeNe League period (2012 to 2015), the highest placed Dutch team is considered as national champion by the Royal Dutch Football Association.
