= Sejde Abrahamsson =

Turkish footballer (born 1998)

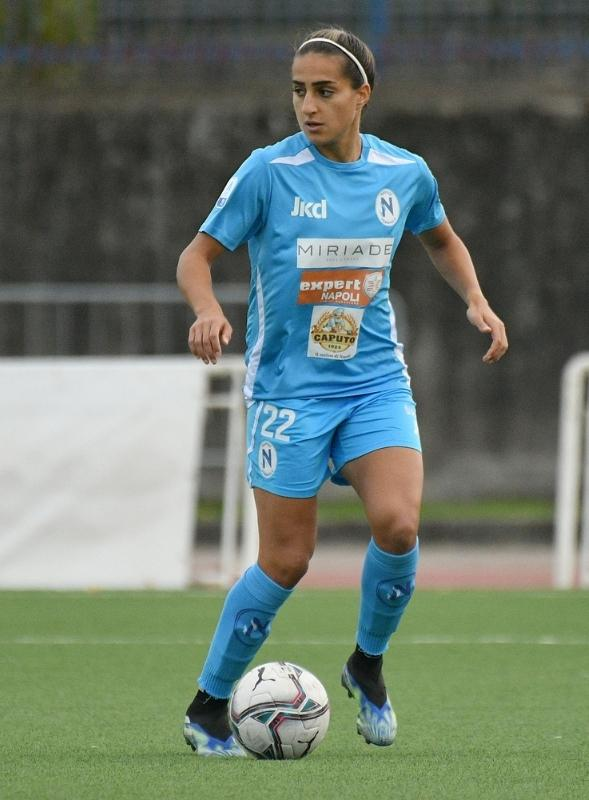
- Abrahamsson in 2022

Personal information
- Full name: Sejde Aftoni̇a Aylli̇n Aykal
- Birth name: Sejde Aftonia Ayllin Abrahamsson
- Date of birth: 24 January 1998 (age 28)
- Place of birth: Örebro, Sweden
- Height: 1.65 m (5 ft 5 in)
- Positions: Midfielder; defender

Team information
- Current team: FOMGET GSK
- Number: 2

Senior career*
Years	Team	Apps	(Gls)
2012–2016	KIF Örebro	19	(0)
2017–2018	Hammarby	41	(0)
2019	KIF Orebro	12	(1)
2020	Piteå	20	(0)
2021	Sevilla	4	(0)
2021–2022	Napoli	20	(0)
2022	Slavia Prague	6	(0)
2023–	Club YLA	15	(1)

International career^{‡}
2013	Sweden U15		
2018	Sweden U23		
2024–	Turkey	16	(1)
- * Club domestic league appearances and goals as of 16 July 2023 ‡ National team caps and goals as of 3 June 2025

Sejde Aftoni̇a Aylli̇n Aykal (born 24 January 1998), known as Sejde Abrahamsson, is a footballer who plays as a midfielder for Belgian Women's Super League side Club YLA. Born in Sweden, she plays for the Turkey women's national team. She represented her country of birth at U15 and U23 levels.

== Club career ==
=== In Sweden ===
Abrahamsson plays as a central defender and full back in the center back position.

She played her first years at professional level in her hometown club KIF Örebro. After three league seasons, she moved to the Stockholm-based club Hammarby for the 2017–18 season. She played two seasons with Hammarby. In the last match of the successful season, she tore her cruciate ligament. In the 2019 season, she returned to her home club KIF Örebro, where she completed her rehab. In the 2020 season, she joined Piteå.

=== In foreign countries ===
Her career in foreign countries began when she left her club Piteå in Sweden in the winter of 2020 to join Sevilla in Spain, where she played only a few matches due to an injury. In July 2021, she signed with the Italian Seria A-club Napoli. She played for the Czech club Slavia Prague in 2022. In the 2023–24 season, she transferred to Club YLA, the women's section of Club Brugge KV in Belgium.

== International career ==
=== Sweden ===
Abrahamsson was selected to the Sweden girls' national under-15 football team in September 2013 to play in two matches against Norway.

Already at age 20, she became a member of the Sweden women's national under-23 football team in 2018.

=== Turkey ===
Abrahamsson was called up to the Turkey national team as midfielder in July 2023. She is eligible through descent. She played in two friendly matches in February 2024, scoring the only winning goal against Romania. She played her first official match appearing in the UEFA Women's Euro 2025 qualifying League B against Switzerland.

== Honours ==
KIF Örebro DFF
Runners-up (1):

Damallsvenskan: 2014
