= Katalin Kulcsár =

Hungarian football referee

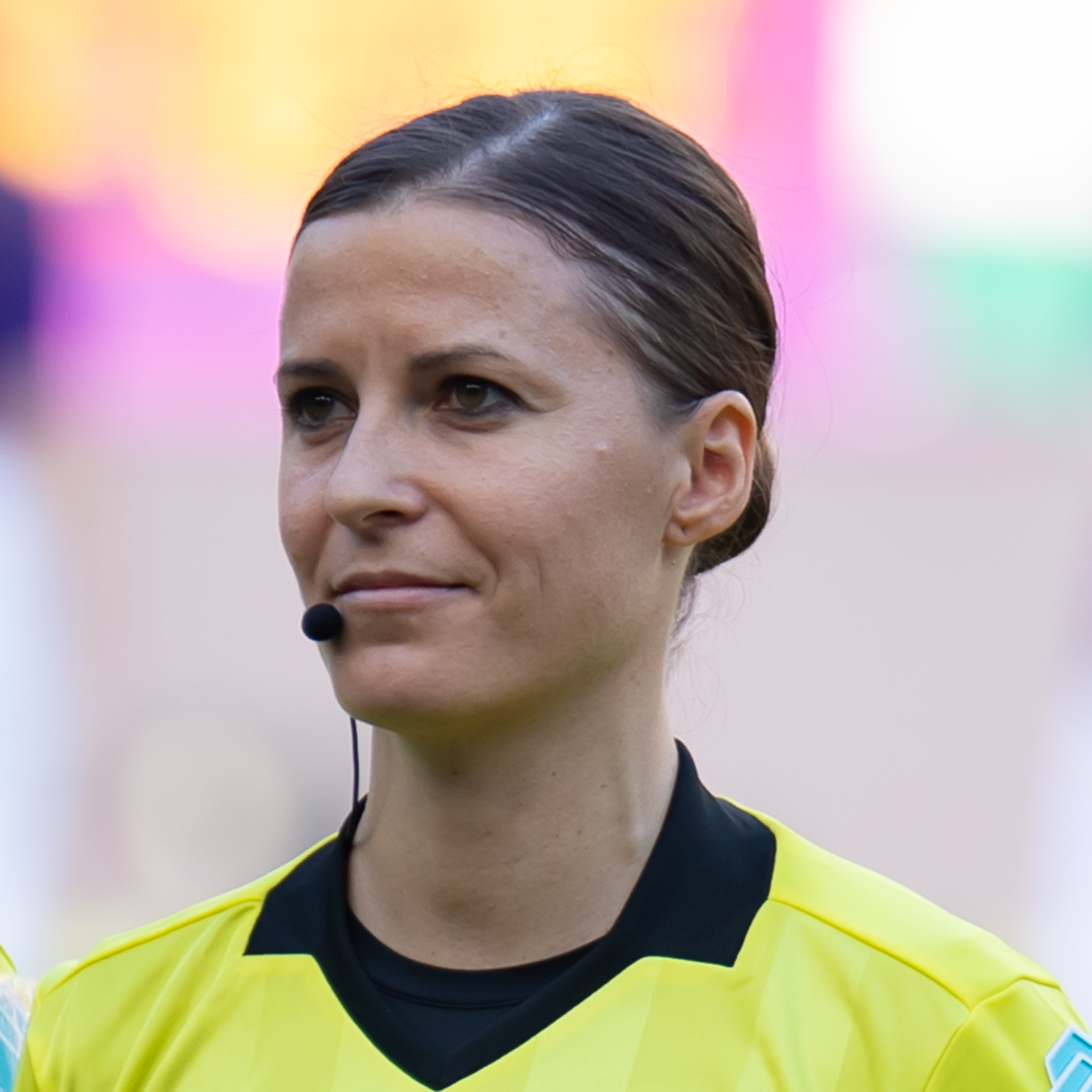
- Kulcsár in 2019
- Full name: Katalin Anna Kulcsár
- Born: 7 December 1984 (age 41); Győr, Hungary
- Other occupation: Economist

Domestic
Years	League	Role
2011–	NB I	Referee

International
Years	League	Role
2004–	FIFA listed	Referee

Katalin Anna Kulcsár (born 7 December 1984) is a Hungarian football referee. She is 168 cm (5 ft 6 in) tall and took charge of her first international match in September 2004, Malta versus Bosnia and Herzegovina. She refereed the final of the 2009 UEFA Women's Under-17 Championship.

She eventually reached the top division of male football in Hungary, the Nemzeti Bajnokság I, officiating a match between BFC Siófok and Honvéd in 2011. She was selected by FIFA for the 2015 FIFA Women's World Cup.

At the 2015 FIFA Women's World Cup, Kulcsár officiated the group-round match between New Zealand and China. The game ended in a 2–2 draw with China advanced to the knockout round.

Kulcsár was appointed to referee the 2016 UEFA Women's Champions League final at Stadio Città del Tricolore.

On 3 December 2018, Kulcsár was appointed to be a referee for the 2019 FIFA Women's World Cup in France. Kulcsár officiated the United States vs. Spain round of 16 match on 24 June 2019. After the conclusion of the round of 16, Kulcsár was selected as one of 11 officials to officiate matches for the remainder of the tournament.

== List of major matches refereed ==
Date	Match	Tournament	Venue	Result	Ref
26 May 2016	Wolfsburg vs. Lyon	2016 UEFA Women's Champions League final	Mapei Stadium – Città del Tricolore, Reggio Emilia	1–1 (a.e.t.; Lyon won 4–3 on penalties)	

== Honours ==
- IFFHS World's Best Woman Referee: 2016

Preceded by (Switzerland) Esther Staubli	2016 UEFA Women's Champions League Final (Hungary) Katalin Kulcsár	Succeeded by (Germany) Bibiana Steinhaus
