= Babett Peter =

German footballer (born 1988)

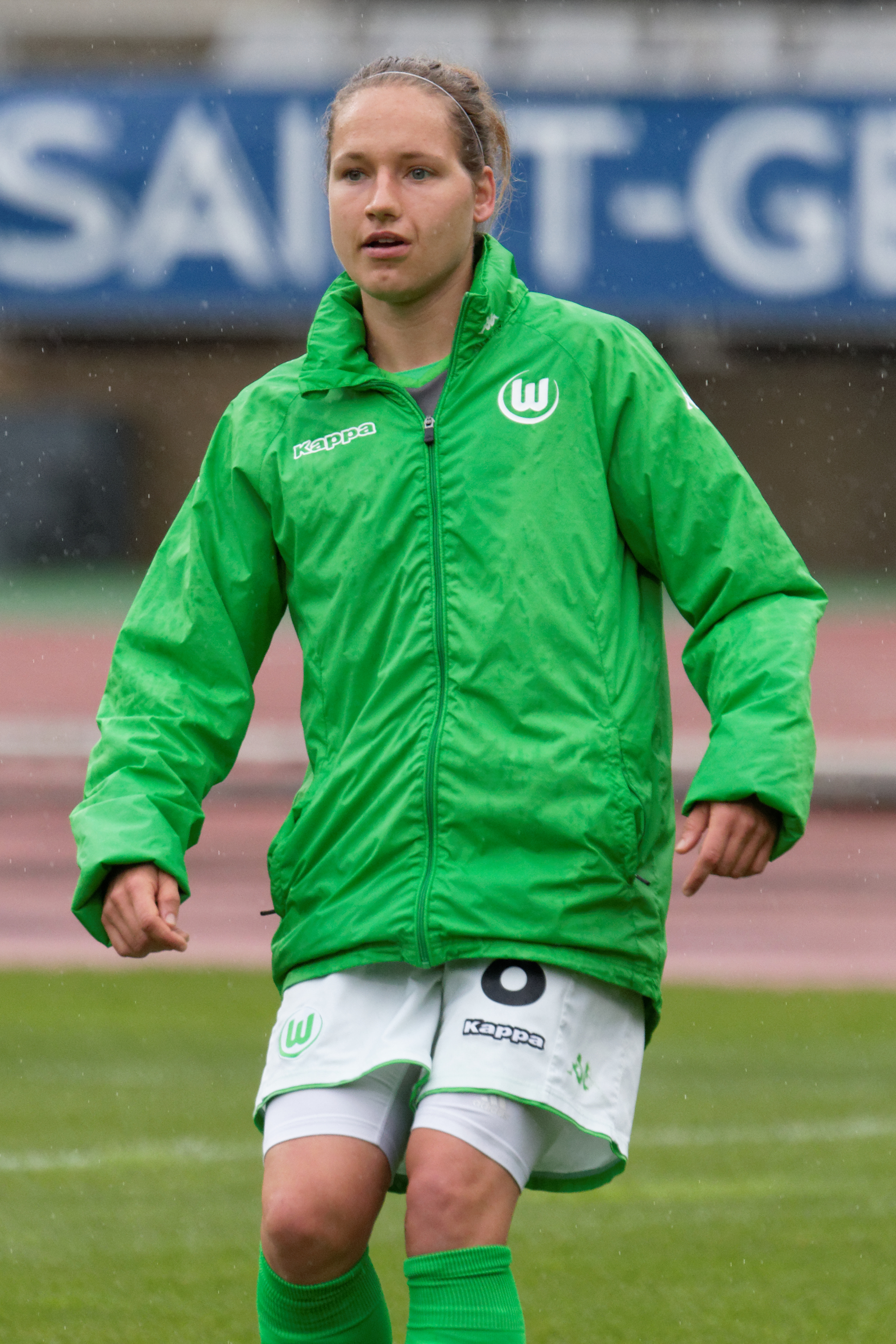
- Peter with VfL Wolfsburg in 2015

Personal information
- Date of birth: 12 May 1988 (age 38)
- Place of birth: Oschatz, East Germany
- Height: 1.71 m (5 ft 7 in)
- Position: Defender

Youth career
- FSV Oschatz
- 1. FC Lokomotive Leipzig

Senior career*
Years	Team	Apps	(Gls)
2004–2005	1. FC Lokomotive Leipzig	30	(4)
2006–2012	1. FFC Turbine Potsdam	138	(17)
2012–2014	1. FFC Frankfurt	26	(1)
2014–2019	VfL Wolfsburg	95	(8)
2019–2020	CD Tacón	18	(1)
2020–2022	Real Madrid	48	(0)

International career^{‡}
2006–2018	Germany	118	(8)
Medal record
Women's football
Representing Germany
FIFA Women's World Cup
Gold medal – first place	2007 China	Team
Olympic Games
Bronze medal – third place	2008 Beijing	Team
Gold medal – first place	2016 Rio de Janeiro	Team
UEFA Women's Championship
Gold medal – first place	2009 Finland	Team
- * Club domestic league appearances and goals as of 15 May 2022 ‡ National team caps and goals as of 10 November 2018

Babett Peter (born 12 May 1988) is a former German professional footballer who has been the sports director at the Bundesliga club Eintracht Frankfurt since 2026. She played as a defender for Real Madrid CF and for the Germany women's national football team.

== Club career ==
=== Turbine Potsdam ===
Peter started playing football in primary school. At the age of nine, her parents took her to the local football club FSV Oschatz. She later played for 1. FC Lokomotive Leipzig and was called up for German national teams at the junior level. During the winter break of the 2005–06 season, she moved to 1. FFC Turbine Potsdam, winning the Bundesliga title and the German Cup in her first season. In September 2007, Peter received the Fritz Walter medal in gold as the best female junior player of the year. One month later, she scored her first Bundesliga goal for Potsdam against SG Essen-Schönebeck from the penalty spot.

From 2009 to 2011, Peter won three consecutive Bundesliga titles with Turbine Potsdam. In the 2009–10 season, Potsdam also claimed the inaugural UEFA Women's Champions League title, with Peter scoring during the penalty shoot-out in the final. One year later, Potsdam again made it to the final, but lost against Olympique Lyonnais.

=== FFC Frankfurt, 2012 - 2014 ===
On 29 February 2012, Peter signed a three-year contract and moved to 1. FFC Frankfurt on 1 July 2012.

=== Wolfsburg, 2014 - 2019 ===
In March 2014, Peter joined VfL Wolfsburg. She won three Frauen-Bundesliga titles with Wolfsburg as well as the DFB-Pokal Frauen five times.

=== CD Tacón, 2019 - 2022 ===
On 17 September 2019, VfL Wolfsburg agreed to mutually terminate Babett's contract so she could immediately join Spanish Primera División team CD Tacón, signing a two-year deal with the Madrid-based club. On 2 May 2022, Peter announced she intended to retire at the conclusion of the season.

== International career ==
Peter made her debut in the German national team in March 2006 against Finland. She was part of Germany's winning team at the 2007 FIFA Women's World Cup, but did not play in any game. One year later, she won the bronze medal at the 2008 Summer Olympics, where she became a regular starter for Germany in the knockout stage of the tournament. Peter was part of Germany's team winning the country's seventh title at the 2009 European Championship. She scored her first goal for the national team at the Algarve Cup facing China in March 2010. Peter was called up for Germany's 2011 FIFA Women's World Cup squad.

She was part of the squad for the 2016 Summer Olympics, where Germany won the gold medal.

On 26 April 2019, she announced her retirement from the national team.

=== International goals ===
Scores and results list Germany's goal tally first:

Peter – goals for Germany
#	Date	Location	Opponent	Score	Result	Competition
1.	1 March 2010	Faro, Portugal	China	4–0	5–0	2010 Algarve Cup
2.	19 November 2011	Wiesbaden, Germany	Kazakhstan	13–0	17–0	Euro 2013 qualifying
3.	19 November 2011	Wiesbaden, Germany	Kazakhstan	14–0	17–0	Euro 2013 qualifying
4.	19 November 2011	Wiesbaden, Germany	Kazakhstan	17–0	17–0	Euro 2013 qualifying
5.	6 March 2016	Nashville, United States	England	2–1	2–1	2016 SheBelieves Cup
6.	21 July 2017	Breda, Netherlands	Italy	2–1	2–1	UEFA Women's Euro 2017
7.	25 July 2017	Utrecht, Netherlands	Russia	1–0	2–0	UEFA Women's Euro 2017
8.	24 October 2017	Großaspach, Germany	Faroe Islands	4–0	11–0	2019 FIFA Women's World Cup qualifying

== Executive career ==
=== Chicago Red Stars, 2022 - Present ===
Peters has worked for the Chicago Red Stars as an assistant general manager since 2022, although she was never formally introduced by the club.

== Personal life ==
Peter graduated from the Potsdam Sports Gymnasium in June 2007, receiving her Abitur diploma. In October 2007, she became a member of the sports support group of the German Armed Forces (Bundeswehr). Since the age of five, Peter has suffered from facial nerve paralysis. At the age of 15, she had an operation which improved her condition.

Peter began a relationship with the American soccer player Ella Masar. In September 2020, Masar gave birth to a baby boy. She married Masar on 21 July 2022.

== Honours ==
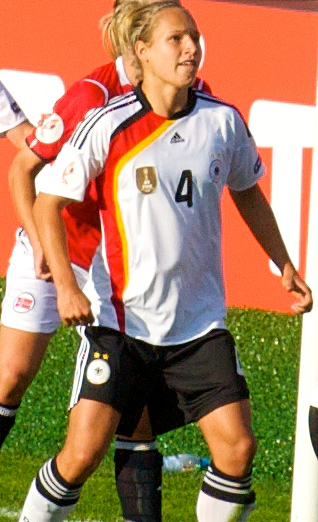
Babett Peter (2009)

=== Club ===
Turbine Potsdam

- UEFA Women's Champions League: Winner 2009–10
- Bundesliga: Winner 2005–06, 2008–09, 2009–10, 2010–11, 2011–12
- DFB-Pokal: Winner 2005–06

1. FFC Frankfurt

- DFB Pokal: Winner 2013–14

VfL Wolfsburg

- Bundesliga: Winner 2016–17, 2017–18, 2018–19
- DFB Pokal: Winner 2014–15, 2015–16, 2016–17, 2017–18, 2018–19

=== International ===
- FIFA World Cup: Winner 2007
- UEFA European Championship: Winner 2009
- Summer Olympic Games: Bronze medal: 2008, Gold medal: 2016
- Algarve Cup: Winner 2006, 2012, 2014

=== Individual ===
- Silbernes Lorbeerblatt: 2007, 2016
- Fritz Walter Medal– Gold: 2007
