= Mapei Stadium – Città del Tricolore =

Football stadium

Coordinates: 44°42′53″N 10°38′59″E

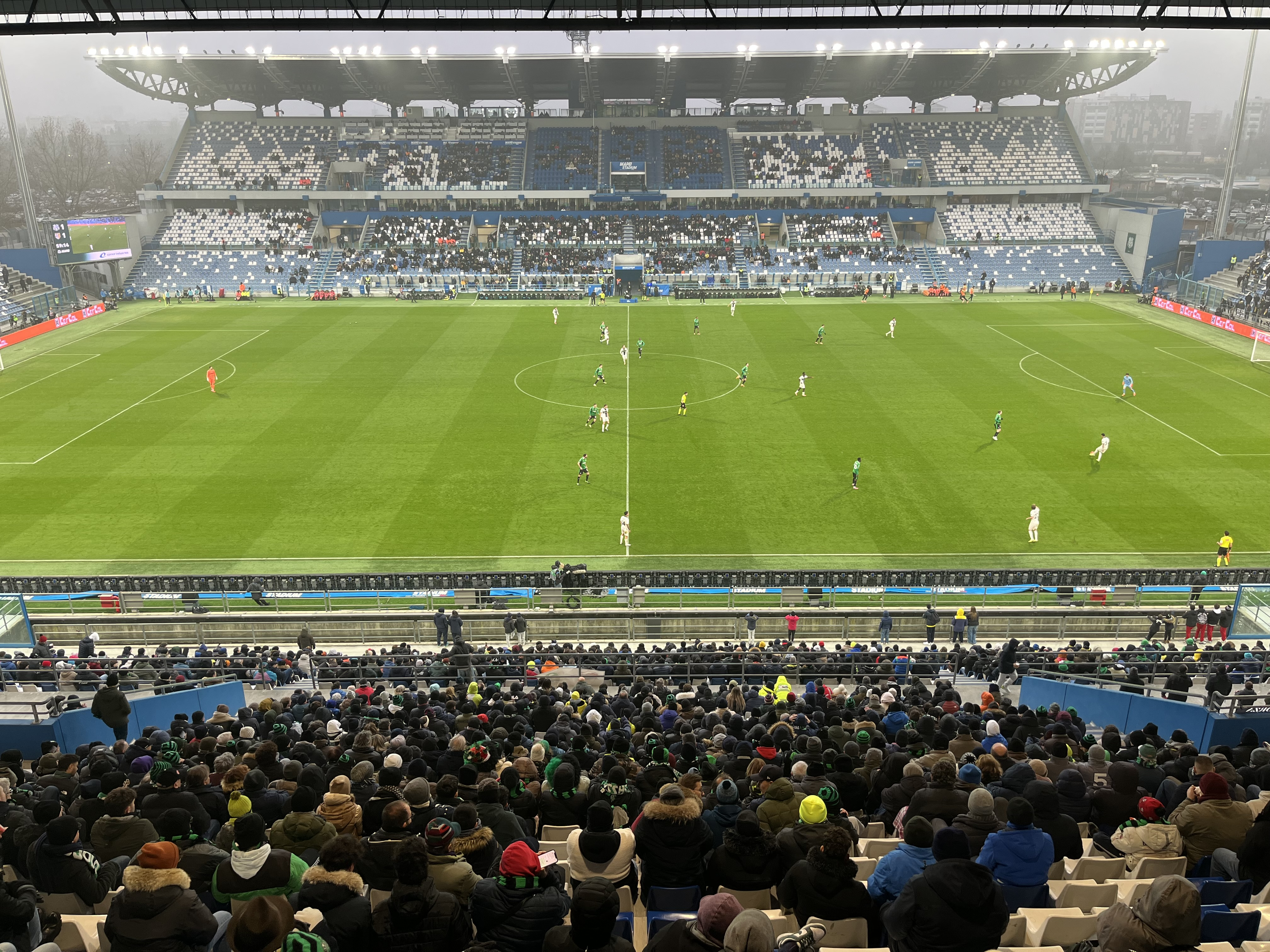
- The Mapei Stadium during a Serie A match between Sassuolo Calcio and Parma Calcio in January 2026
- Interactive map of Mapei Stadium – Città del Tricolore
- Former names: Stadio Giglio (1995–2012); Stadio Città del Tricolore (2012–2013)
- Location: P.le Atleti Azzurri d'Italia, 1; 42122 Reggio Emilia (RE)
- Owner: Mapei S.p.A.
- Capacity: 21,525
- Surface: Grass
- Field size: 105 x 68 m

Construction
- Opened: 1995

Tenants
- Reggiana (1995–present); Carpi (2011–2012); Sassuolo (2013–present); Italy national football team (selected matches)

Mapei Stadium – Città del Tricolore (Italian pronunciation: [tʃitˈta ddel trikoˈloːre]; with the first half officially written in all caps) is a multi-purpose stadium in Reggio Emilia, Italy. It is the home ground of US Sassuolo and AC Reggiana, the former playing in Serie A, the latter in Serie C.

The stadium holds 21,525 and was built in 1995, replacing the Stadio Mirabello. It was given the name Stadio Città del Tricolore on 11 March 2012, having previously been called the Stadio Giglio. On 8 July 2013, the stadium name was changed to reflect its acquisition by Mapei from the comune of Reggio Emilia.

== History ==
The need for a new stadium in Reggio Emilia started when Reggiana gained promotion to Serie A in 1993; the club launched multi-year season tickets in order to raise money to build a new stadium on its property. Stadio Giglio was opened in 1995 with a sold-out match between Reggiana and Juventus. In the aftermath of Reggiana's dissolution and reconstitution in 2005, the club lost ownership of the stadium, which was assigned to the Tribunal of Reggio Emilia.

The reconstituted Reggiana continued to play in the stadium and had its headquarters and its historical museum located in the Main Stand; in the same years the shopping mall "I Petali" was built behind the Away End and the East Stand. Stadio Giglio was renamed by the Municipality to "Città del Tricolore", referring to the creation of the Italian Tricolour in Reggio Emilia in 1797.

The stadium has a water-filled moat between the pitch and the stands that is intended to prevent pitch invasions. Because the water is supplied from a nearby river, there have even been cases in which bored fans have been seen successfully fishing in it.

The stadium was auctioned between 2010–13, after its co-owners A.C. Reggiana and MIRABELLO 2000 - S.p.a. declared bankruptcy. The initial asking price of €6 million was significantly lowered after no bids were presented. In 2013, an offer was received and accepted from the manufacturer MAPEI, owned by former Confindustria president Giorgio Squinzi, which also owned U.S. Sassuolo Calcio, promoted to Serie A at the end of the 2012–13 season. The stadium was then renamed "MAPEI Stadium".

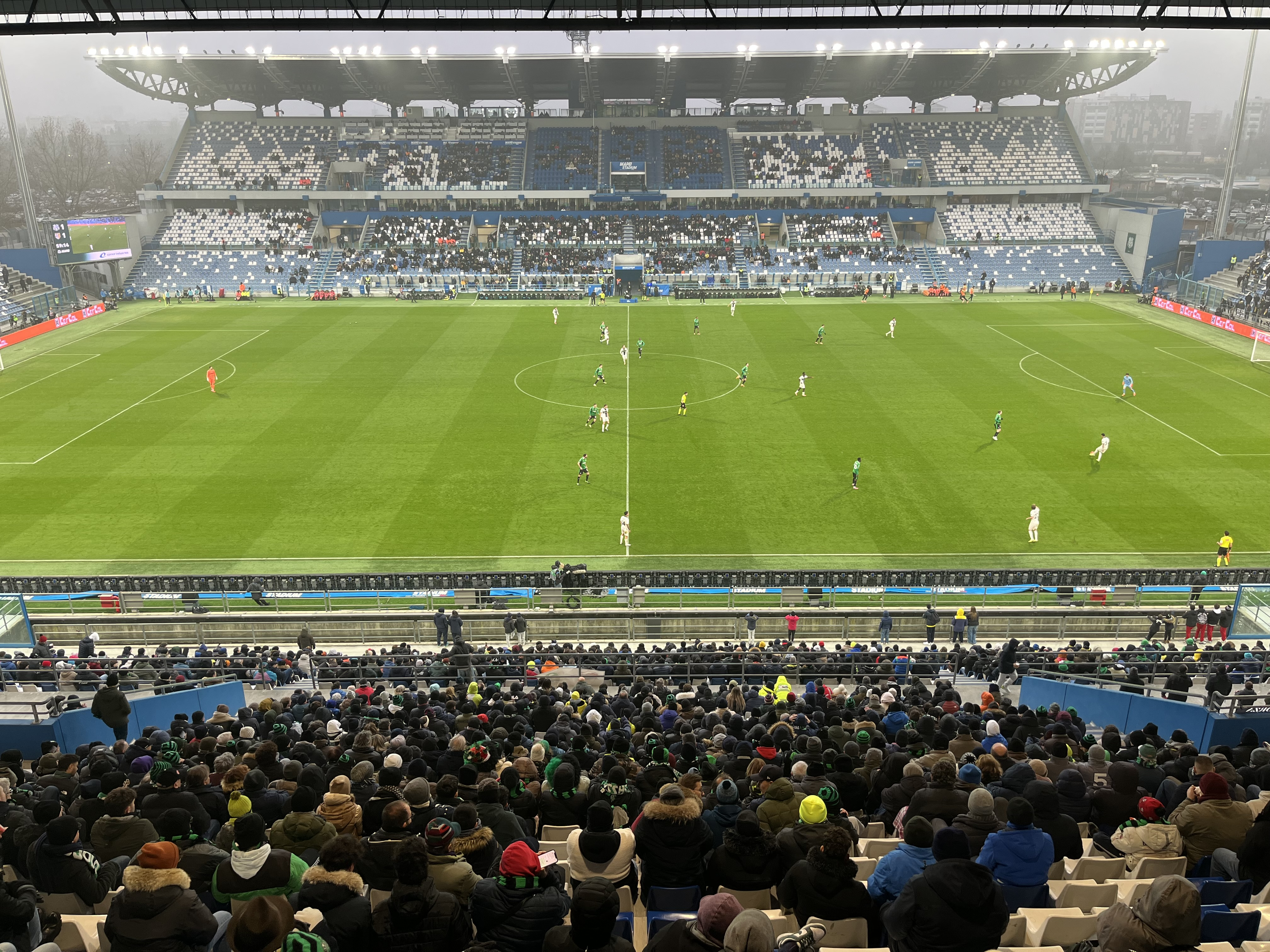
Das Mapei Stadion während eines Serie A Spiels zwischen Sassuolo Calcio und Parma Calcio im Januar 2026

Sassuolo's move and MAPEI's acquisition and subsequent renaming of the stadium have led to significant backlash from Reggiana supporters. The protests included demonstrations at the 2015 TIM Trophy and during some Sassuolo's Serie A games and the formation of a group called "Via il Sassuolo da Reggio Emilia" (Sassuolo out of Reggio Emilia), who organized protest marches through the city center. In June 2016 a group of Reggiana ultras attended the Campionato Primavera match held in the stadium between Roma and Juventus and protested against the stadium's ownership. In September 2016, Luca Vecchi, mayor of Reggio Emilia, was heavily booed by the fans during the club's presentation due to the Municipality position on the dispute.

== Events ==
It is currently used mostly for football matches and is the home ground of Reggiana. It also hosts larger rugby union matches for the United Rugby Championship team Zebre of Parma.

Football club Carpi used the ground for home matches during the 2011–12 season. In the 2013–14 season, the promoted Serie A side, Sassuolo, played at the ground. They signed a two-year rent deal with Reggiana, which manages the venue. The agreement struck with Reggiana also included infrastructure improvements, new benches and locker rooms, and the development of new marketing and trade policies. The stadium was consequently renamed Mapei Stadium – Città del Tricolore.

The stadium hosted the 2016 UEFA Women's Champions League final between Wolfsburg and Lyon, the 2020 Supercoppa Italiana between Juventus and Napoli, and the 2021 Coppa Italia Final between Atalanta and Juventus.

Preceded by Friedrich-Ludwig-Jahn-Sportpark; Berlin	UEFA Women's Champions League; Final venue 2016	Succeeded by Cardiff City Stadium; Cardiff
