= 2019 FIFA Women's World Cup qualification – UEFA Group 2 =

Football tournament qualification stage

UEFA Group 2 of the 2019 FIFA Women's World Cup qualification competition consisted of five teams: Switzerland, Scotland, Poland, Belarus, and Albania (which advanced from the preliminary round). The composition of the seven groups in the qualifying group stage was decided by the draw held on 25 April 2017, with the teams seeded according to their coefficient ranking.

The group was played in home-and-away round-robin format between 15 September 2017 and 4 September 2018. The group winners qualified for the final tournament, while the runners-up advanced to the play-offs if they were one of the four best runners-up among all seven groups (not counting results against the fifth-placed team).

== Standings ==
Pos	Team	Pld	W	D	L	GF	GA	GD	Pts	Qualification	Scotland	Switzerland	Poland	Albania	Belarus
1	Scotland	8	7	0	1	19	7	+12	21	2019 FIFA Women's World Cup	—	2–1	3–0	5–0	2–1
2	Switzerland	8	6	1	1	21	5	+16	19	Play-offs	1–0	—	2–1	5–1	3–0
3	Poland	8	3	2	3	16	12	+4	11		2–3	0–0	—	1–1	4–1
4	Albania	8	1	1	6	6	22	−16	4		1–2	1–4	1–4	—	1–0
5	Belarus	8	1	0	7	5	21	−16	3		1–2	0–5	1–4	1–0	—

Source: UEFA
Rules for classification: Qualification tiebreakers

== Matches ==
Times are CET/CEST, (Note: CEST (UTC+2) for dates between 26 March and 28 October 2017 and between 25 March and 27 October 2018, and CET (UTC+1) for all other dates.) as listed by UEFA (local times, if different, are in parentheses).

15 September 2017
17:00

Albania	1–4	Switzerland
Begolli 81'	Report	Brunner 23'; Bachmann 39'; Crnogorčević 41' (pen.); Dickenmann 67'

Elbasan Arena, Elbasan
Attendance: 200
Referee: Amy Rayner (England)
15 September 2017
18:00

Poland	4–1	Belarus
Tarczyńska 14'; Kamczyk 37'; Pajor 42', 59'	Report	Shcherbachenia 44'

Stadion Górnika Łęczna, Łęczna
Attendance: 3,740
Referee: Tanja Subotič (Slovenia)

19 September 2017
17:00 (18:00 FET)

Belarus	1–0	Albania
Shuppo 48'	Report

FC Minsk Stadium, Minsk
Attendance: 350
Referee: Paula Brady (Republic of Ireland)
19 September 2017
19:00

Switzerland	2–1	Poland
Bernauer 20'; Dickenmann 39'	Report	Pajor 34'

Tissot Arena, Biel/Bienne
Attendance: 811
Referee: Eleni Antoniou (Greece)

19 October 2017
17:00 (18:00 FET)

Belarus	1–2	Scotland
Kharlanova 25'	Report	Ross 28'; Kozyupa 62' (o.g.)

FC Minsk Stadium, Minsk
Attendance: 420
Referee: Nelli Stepanyan (Armenia)

24 October 2017
20:30 (19:30 BST)

Scotland	5–0	Albania
Begolli 21' (o.g.); Brown 33'; Ross 54'; Emslie 56'; Evans 82'	Report

St Mirren Park, Paisley
Attendance: 1,845
Referee: Dimitrina Milkova (Bulgaria)

24 November 2017
17:00

Albania	1–4	Poland
Doci 78'	Report	Sikora 5'; Guściora 13'; Winczo 37', 66'

Loro Boriçi Stadium, Shkodër
Attendance: 800
Referee: Iuliana Demetrescu (Romania)
24 November 2017
19:00

Switzerland	3–0	Belarus
Calligaris 17'; Wälti 18'; Reuteler 56'	Report

LIPO Park, Schaffhausen
Attendance: 2,017
Referee: Cheryl Foster (Wales)

28 November 2017
19:00

Switzerland	5–1	Albania
Ismaili 8', 87'; Bachmann 35'; Kiwic 73'; Calligaris 80'	Report	Krasniqi 29'

Tissot Arena, Biel/Bienne
Attendance: 1,215
Referee: Petra Pavlikova (Slovakia)

5 April 2018
19:00

Switzerland	1–0	Scotland
Dickenmann 32'	Report

LIPO Park, Schaffhausen
Attendance: 2,504
Referee: Olga Zadinová (Czech Republic)
6 April 2018
17:30

Poland	1–1	Albania
Daleszczyk 2'	Report	Morina 74'

OSiR Włocławek, Włocławek
Attendance: 1,925
Referee: María Dolores Martinez Madrona (Spain)

10 April 2018
16:00

Albania	1–0	Belarus
Gjini 88'	Report

Elbasan Arena, Elbasan
Attendance: 700
Referee: Ifeoma Kulmala (Finland)
10 April 2018
20:35 (19:35 BST)

Scotland	3–0	Poland
Ness 79'; Emslie 86'; Cuthbert 90+1'	Report

St Mirren Park, Paisley
Attendance: 2,121
Referee: Riem Hussein (Germany)

7 June 2018
20:35 (19:35 BST)

Scotland	2–1	Belarus
Cuthbert 45+2', 65'	Report	Olkhovik 27'

Falkirk Stadium, Falkirk
Attendance: 2,007
Referee: Lois Otte (Belgium)

12 June 2018
15:30

Poland	2–3	Scotland
Jaszek 6'; Howard 66' (o.g.)	Report	Little 78'; Ross 80'; Evans 90'

Kielce City Stadium, Kielce
Attendance: 4,410
Referee: Stéphanie Frappart (France)
12 June 2018
17:00 (18:00 FET)

Belarus	0–5	Switzerland
	Report	Crnogorčević 5' (pen.); Dickenmann 18', 55'; Karachun 34' (o.g.); Calligaris 76'

FC Minsk Stadium, Minsk
Attendance: 300
Referee: Viola Raudziņa (Latvia)

30 August 2018
20:35 (19:35 BST)

Scotland	2–1	Switzerland
Cuthbert 2'; Little 6'	Report	Dickenmann 7'

St Mirren Park, Paisley
Attendance: 4,098
Referee: Sara Persson (Sweden)
31 August 2018
16:00 (17:00 FET)

Belarus	1–4	Poland
Shlapakova 53'	Report	Winczo 44'; Pajor 47', 86'; Kamczyk 56'

Traktor Stadium, Minsk
Attendance: 250
Referee: Ainara Andrea Acevedo Dudley (Spain)

4 September 2018
17:00

Poland	0–0	Switzerland
	Report

Stadion Stali Mielec, Mielec
Attendance: 5,128
Referee: Ivana Martinčić (Croatia)
4 September 2018
17:00

Albania	1–2	Scotland
Doci 45'	Report	Little 9'; Ross 68'

Loro Boriçi Stadium, Shkodër
Attendance: 700
Referee: Barbara Poxhofer (Austria)

== Goalscorers ==
There were 67 goals scored in 20 matches, for an average of 3.35 goals per match.

6 goals

- (Switzerland) Lara Dickenmann

5 goals

- (Poland) Ewa Pajor

4 goals

- (Scotland) Erin Cuthbert
- (Scotland) Jane Ross

3 goals

- (Poland) Agnieszka Winczo
- (Scotland) Kim Little
- (Switzerland) Viola Calligaris

2 goals

- (Albania) Megi Doci
- (Poland) Ewelina Kamczyk
- (Scotland) Claire Emslie
- (Scotland) Lisa Evans
- (Switzerland) Ramona Bachmann
- (Switzerland) Ana-Maria Crnogorčević
- (Switzerland) Florijana Ismaili

1 goal

- (Albania) Lavdie Begolli
- (Albania) Lucie Gjini
- (Albania) Qendresa Krasniqi
- (Albania) Geldona Morina
- (Belarus) Anastasiya Kharlanova
- (Belarus) Karina Olkhovik
- (Belarus) Anastasia Shcherbachenia
- (Belarus) Anastasia Shlapakova
- (Belarus) Anastasia Shuppo
- (Poland) Katarzyna Daleszczyk
- (Poland) Agata Guściora
- (Poland) Dżesika Jaszek
- (Poland) Aleksandra Sikora
- (Poland) Agata Tarczyńska
- (Scotland) Fiona Brown
- (Scotland) Zoe Ness
- (Switzerland) Vanessa Bernauer
- (Switzerland) Jana Brunner
- (Switzerland) Rahel Kiwic
- (Switzerland) Géraldine Reuteler
- (Switzerland) Lia Wälti

1 own goal

- (Albania) Lavdie Begolli (against Scotland)
- (Belarus) Valeria Karachun (against Switzerland)
- (Belarus) Anna Kozyupa (against Scotland)
- (Scotland) Sophie Howard (against Poland)
