= UEFA Women's Euro 2025 qualifying League C =

Tournament details
- Dates: 5 April – 16 July 2024
- Teams: 19
- Promoted: Albania; Belarus; Greece; Romania; Slovenia

Tournament statistics
- Matches played: 52
- Goals scored: 175 (3.37 per match)
- Attendance: 28,239 (543 per match)
- Top scorer(s): (Slovenia) Lara Prašnikar (8 goals)
- Women's Nations League Women's Euro qualifying

League C of UEFA Women's Euro 2025 qualifying was the third and lowest division of qualifying for UEFA Women's Euro 2025, the international football competition involving the women's national teams of the member associations of UEFA. The results were also used to determine the leagues for the 2025 UEFA Women's Nations League competition.

== Format ==
League C consists of 19 UEFA members ranked 33rd to 51st among competition entrants in the 2023–24 UEFA Women's Nations League ranking, split into four groups of four (Groups 1 to 4) and one group of three (Group 5). Each team played six matches (in four-team groups) or four matches (in three-team group) within their group, using the home-and-away round-robin format with double matchdays in April, May to June, and July 2024.

After the league phase, the five group winners and the three best group runners-up advanced to the play-offs to determine who qualifies for the final tournament. For the first play-off round the eight League C teams were unseeded, and drawn against the eight lowest-ranked teams in League A. The winner of those ties will advance to the second round.

The competition also acted as the first phase for the 2025 UEFA Women's Nations League, which will use an identical league structure. The five group winners were promoted to League B.

== Seeding ==
Teams were allocated to League C after the conclusion of the 2023–24 Women's Nations League promotion/relegation matches on 27 February 2024. Teams were split into three pots of five teams and one pot of four teams, ordered based on their overall ranking.

Pot 1
Team	Rank
Slovenia	28
Greece	29
Belarus	30
Romania	31
Albania	32

Pot 2
Team	Rank
Latvia (Note: Bulgaria, Latvia, Montenegro, Northern Ireland, Slovakia, and Ukraine participated in the League B vs League C promotion/relegation matches in February 2024 to determine each team's league allocation.)	38
Montenegro	39
Bulgaria	40
Estonia	41
Lithuania	42

Pot 3
Team	Rank
Luxembourg	43
Kazakhstan	44
North Macedonia	45
Cyprus	46
Andorra	47

Pot 4
Team	Rank
Georgia	48
Moldova	49
Faroe Islands	50
Armenia	51

The draw took place in Nyon, Switzerland on 5 March 2024 at 13:00 CET. Groups 1 to 4 contained one team from each pot, while Group 5 contained one team from Pots 1 to 3. The draw started with Pot 1 and ended with Pot 4, with drawn teams assigned to the first available group in ascending order from C1 to C5. The teams that previously played in three-team groups in the 2023-24 Women's Nations League (Bulgaria and North Macedonia), were drawn into four-team groups for this competition.

== Groups ==
Times are CEST (UTC+2), as listed by UEFA (local times, if different, are in parentheses).

=== Group 1 ===
Pos	Team	Pld	W	D	L	GF	GA	GD	Pts	Qualification	(Belarus)	(Georgia (country))	(Lithuania)	(Cyprus)
1	Belarus (P)	6	6	0	0	19	0	+19	18	Advance to play-offs (unseeded) and promotion to League B	—	3–0	3–0 (Note: Lithuania refused to play against Belarus due to Belarusian involvement in the Russian invasion of Ukraine. UEFA subsequently declared the matches as forfeited by Lithuania and they were deemed to have lost both matches 0–3.)	5–0
2	Georgia	6	3	1	2	6	7	−1	10	Advance to play-offs (unseeded)	0–2	—	2–2	1–0
3	Lithuania	6	2	1	3	5	10	−5	7		0–3	0–1	—	1–0
4	Cyprus	6	0	0	6	1	14	−13	0		0–3	0–2	1–2	—

Source: UEFA
Rules for classification: Tiebreakers
(P) Promoted
Notes:
5 April 2024
16:00 (17:00 UTC+3)

Cyprus	0–3	Belarus
	Report	Kubichnaya 2'; Shuppo 45+2' (pen.); Shlapakova 90+5'

Dasaki Stadium, Dasaki Achnas
Attendance: 114
Referee: Stacey Pearson (England)
5 April 2024
17:00 (19:00 UTC+4)

Georgia	2–2	Lithuania
Bakradze 12', 19'	Report	Lazdauskaitė 20'; Jonušaitė 59'

M. Meskhi II Stadium, Tbilisi
Attendance: 2,100
Referee: Araksya Saribekyan (Armenia)

9 April 2024
18:00 (19:00 UTC+3)

Belarus	3–0	Georgia
Shlapakova 45'; Pilipenko 64'; Kozyupa 70'	Report

Dasaki Stadium, Dasaki Achnas (Cyprus) (Note: Due to Belarusian involvement in the Russian invasion of Ukraine, Belarus was required to play its home matches at neutral venues, and behind closed doors.)
Attendance: 0 (behind closed doors)
Referee: María Eugenia Gil Soriano (Spain)
9 April 2024
18:30 (19:30 UTC+3)

Lithuania	1–0	Cyprus
Liužinaitė 46'	Report

LFF Stadium, Vilnius
Attendance: 357
Referee: Louise Thompson (Northern Ireland)

31 May 2024

Lithuania	0–3 Awarded (Note: Lithuania refused to play against Belarus due to Belarusian involvement in the Russian invasion of Ukraine. UEFA subsequently declared the matches as forfeited by Lithuania and they were deemed to have lost both matches 0–3. The Lithuanian Football Federation was also fined €5,000.)	Belarus
	Report

31 May 2024
18:00 (19:00 UTC+3)

Cyprus	0–2	Georgia
	Report	Khaburdzania 32'; Bakradze 63'

Dasaki Stadium, Dasaki Achnas
Attendance: 270
Referee: Karoline Marie Jensen (Norway)

4 June 2024

Belarus	3–0 Awarded	Lithuania
	Report

4 June 2024
18:00 (20:00 UTC+4)

Georgia	1–0	Cyprus
Bakradze 13'	Report

M. Meskhi II Stadium, Tbilisi
Attendance: 1,250
Referee: Farida Lutfaliyeva (Azerbaijan)

12 July 2024
18:00 (20:00 UTC+4)

Georgia	0–2	Belarus
	Report	Alkhovik 86'; Valiuk 90+2'

M. Meskhi II Stadium, Tbilisi
Attendance: 1,240
Referee: Oxana Cruc (Moldova)
12 July 2024
19:00 (20:00 UTC+3)

Cyprus	1–2	Lithuania
Matsoukari 24'	Report	Jonušaitė 28', 90+5'

Dasaki Stadium, Dasaki Achnas
Attendance: 207
Referee: Jeļena Jermolajeva (Latvia)

16 July 2024
19:00 (21:00 UTC+4)

Belarus	5–0	Cyprus
Shuppo 15' (pen.); Maniukova 41'; Alkhovik 55'; Belaya 65'; Charlionak 90'	Report

M. Meskhi II Stadium, Tbilisi (Georgia)
Attendance: 0 (behind closed doors)
Referee: Vesna Miletić (Bosnia and Herzegovina)
16 July 2024
19:00 (20:00 UTC+3)

Lithuania	0–1	Georgia
	Report	Bebia 88' (pen.)

LSC Druskininkai Stadium, Druskininkai
Attendance: 260
Referee: Martina Molinaro (Italy)

=== Group 2 ===
Pos	Team	Pld	W	D	L	GF	GA	GD	Pts	Qualification	(Slovenia)	(Latvia)	(North Macedonia)	(Moldova)
1	Slovenia (P)	6	6	0	0	26	0	+26	18	Advance to play-offs (unseeded) and promotion to League B	—	6–0	4–0	2–0
2	Latvia	6	3	0	3	8	16	−8	9		0–4	—	3–4	2–1
3	North Macedonia	6	2	1	3	10	17	−7	7		0–5	1–2	—	1–1
4	Moldova	6	0	1	5	4	15	−11	1		0–5	0–1	2–4	—

Source: UEFA
Rules for classification: Tiebreakers
(P) Promoted
5 April 2024
16:30

Slovenia	2–0	Moldova
Prašnikar 45+2'; Kuštrin 56'	Report

Šiška Sports Park, Ljubljana
Attendance: 525
Referee: Andromachi Tsiofliki (Greece)
5 April 2024
16:30 (17:30 UTC+3)

Latvia	3–4	North Macedonia
Miksone 7', 76'; Poļuhoviča 63'	Report	Rochi 17'; Ročāne 25' (o.g.); Andonova 32'; Gornela 69' (o.g.)

LNK Sporta Parks, Riga
Attendance: 208
Referee: Lovisa Johansson (Sweden)

9 April 2024
15:00

North Macedonia	0–5	Slovenia
	Report	Korošec 24'; Panchurova 29' (o.g.); Prašnikar 56'; Kajzba 84'; Kolbl 88'

Petar Miloševski Training Centre, Skopje
Attendance: 152
Referee: Zoe Stavrou (Cyprus)
9 April 2024
17:00 (18:00 UTC+3)

Moldova	0–1	Latvia
	Report	Colesnicenco 63' (o.g.)

Zimbru Stadium, Chișinău
Attendance: 340
Referee: Teresa Oliveira (Portugal)

31 May 2024
17:00

North Macedonia	1–1	Moldova
Maksuti 52'	Report	Țabur 55'

Petar Miloševski Training Centre, Skopje
Attendance: 150
Referee: Audrey Gerbel (France)
31 May 2024
18:00

Slovenia	6–0	Latvia
Agrež 32'; Golob 57'; Kolbl 70'; Kajzba 75'; Korošec 77'; Prašnikar 90'	Report

Fazanerija City Stadium, Murska Sobota
Attendance: 549
Referee: Ana Maria Terteleac (Romania)

4 June 2024
17:00 (18:00 UTC+3)

Latvia	0–4	Slovenia
	Report	Prašnikar 24', 42'; Kolbl 47'; Janež 72'

Sloka Stadium, Jūrmala
Attendance: 224
Referee: Sofiya Prychyna (Ukraine)
4 June 2024
18:00 (19:00 UTC+3)

Moldova	2–4	North Macedonia
Țabur 22'; Colnic 59'	Report	Bădiceanu 2' (o.g.); Andonova 26' (pen.), 75'; Andreevska 43'

Zimbru Stadium, Chișinău
Attendance: 378
Referee: Ioanna Allayiotou (Cyprus)

12 July 2024
19:00

North Macedonia	1–2	Latvia
Andonova 90+2'	Report	Poļuhoviča 45+3'; Ševcova 90+5'

Petar Miloševski Training Centre, Skopje
Attendance: 200
Referee: Jana Van Laere (Belgium)
12 July 2024
19:00 (20:00 UTC+3)

Moldova	0–5	Slovenia
	Report	Kolbl 28'; Makovec 36'; Prašnikar 44'; Kramžar 45+3'; Korošec 87'

Zimbru Stadium, Chișinău
Attendance: 416
Referee: Melis Özçiğdem (Turkey)

16 July 2024
19:00

Slovenia	4–0	North Macedonia
Prašnikar 3', 6'; Korošec 35'; Kastelec 71'	Report

Aluminij Sports Park, Kidričevo
Attendance: 317
Referee: Frederikke Lydia Søkjær (Denmark)
16 July 2024
19:00 (20:00 UTC+3)

Latvia	2–1	Moldova
Čemirtāne 24'; Miksone 82'	Report	Chiper 37'

Daugava Stadium, Riga
Attendance: 603
Referee: Milica Milovanović (Serbia)

=== Group 3 ===
Pos	Team	Pld	W	D	L	GF	GA	GD	Pts	Qualification	(Greece)	(Montenegro)	(Faroe Islands)	(Andorra)
1	Greece (P)	6	5	1	0	17	4	+13	16	Advance to play-offs (unseeded) and promotion to League B	—	2–2	1–0	6–0
2	Montenegro	6	3	1	2	21	10	+11	10	Advance to play-offs (unseeded)	2–3	—	5–1	6–1
3	Faroe Islands	6	3	0	3	11	9	+2	9		0–2	2–1	—	4–0
4	Andorra	6	0	0	6	2	28	−26	0		0–3	1–5	0–4	—

Source: UEFA
Rules for classification: Tiebreakers
(P) Promoted
5 April 2024
16:30

Montenegro	6–1	Andorra
Bulatović 27', 90+3' (pen.); Đoković 37'; Dešić 51', 61'; Božić 74'	Report	Morató 41'

Podgorica City Stadium, Podgorica
Attendance: 250
Referee: Farida Lutfaliyeva (Azerbaijan)
5 April 2024
19:00 (20:00 UTC+3)

Greece	1–0	Faroe Islands
Sarri 55' (pen.)	Report

Theodoros Vardinogiannis Stadium, Heraklion
Attendance: 1,050
Referee: Rita Vehapi (Kosovo)

9 April 2024
16:30

Montenegro	5–1	Faroe Islands
Tomašević 17'; Kuč 41', 58'; Đoković 84'; Dešić 90+1'	Report	Dal Christiansen 9'

Podgorica City Stadium, Podgorica
Attendance: 300
Referee: Emily Heaslip (England)
9 April 2024
19:00

Andorra	0–3	Greece
	Report	Sarri 45+3' (pen.); Spyridonidou 56'; Gkatsou 67'

Estadi Nacional, Andorra la Vella
Attendance: 428
Referee: Jurgita Mačikunytė (Lithuania)

31 May 2024
17:00 (18:00 UTC+3)

Greece	2–2	Montenegro
Markou 11'; Spyridonidou 49'	Report	Kuč 3'; Bulatović 90+4' (pen.)

Theodoros Vardinogiannis Stadium, Heraklion
Attendance: 852
Referee: Fatemeh Zangeneh (Norway)
31 May 2024
17:45 (16:45 UTC+1)

Faroe Islands	4–0	Andorra
Dal Christiansen 25'; Johannesen 48'; Ryan 67'; Hoydal 79'	Report

Tórsvøllur, Tórshavn
Attendance: 507
Referee: Marisca Overtoom (Netherlands)

4 June 2024
17:45 (16:45 UTC+1)

Faroe Islands	0–2	Greece
	Report	Sarri 13'; Koggouli 78'

Tórsvøllur, Tórshavn
Attendance: 477
Referee: Laura Mauricio (Switzerland)
4 June 2024
19:00

Andorra	1–5	Montenegro
Gonçalves 10'	Report	Kuč 1', 6'; Dešić 32'; Đoković 56'; Bulatović 58'

Estadi Nacional, Andorra la Vella
Attendance: 376
Referee: Joanna Vassallo (Malta)

12 July 2024
17:45 (16:45 UTC+1)

Faroe Islands	2–1	Montenegro
Sevdal 19'; Tórolvsdóttir 32'	Report	Kuč 22'

Tórsvøllur, Tórshavn
Attendance: 247
Referee: Emilie Torkelsen (Norway)
12 July 2024
19:00 (20:00 UTC+3)

Greece	6–0	Andorra
Koggouli 1', 58'; Sarri 23'; Papadopoulou 69', 79', 89'	Report

Theodoros Vardinogiannis Stadium, Heraklion
Attendance: 725
Referee: Roxana Recorean (Romania)

16 July 2024
19:00

Montenegro	2–3	Greece
Bulatović 90+5' (pen.), 90+8' (pen.)	Report	Koggouli 6', 62'; Spyridonidou 24'

Camp FSCG, Podgorica
Attendance: 300
Referee: Karoline Wacker (Germany)
16 July 2024
19:00

Andorra	0–4	Faroe Islands
	Report	Tórolvsdóttir 19'; Klakstein 21'; Johannesen 72'; Joensen 90+7'

Estadi Nacional, Andorra la Vella
Attendance: 426
Referee: Eglantina Pjetrushaj (Albania)

=== Group 4 ===
Pos	Team	Pld	W	D	L	GF	GA	GD	Pts	Qualification	(Romania)	(Bulgaria)	(Armenia)	(Kazakhstan)
1	Romania (P)	6	6	0	0	16	1	+15	18	Advance to play-offs (unseeded) and promotion to League B	—	1–0	3–1	1–0
2	Bulgaria	6	2	1	3	6	8	−2	7		0–3	—	2–3	0–0
3	Armenia	6	2	0	4	8	18	−10	6		0–5	1–3	—	2–1
4	Kazakhstan	6	1	1	4	5	8	−3	4		0–3	0–1	4–1	—

Source: UEFA
Rules for classification: Tiebreakers
(P) Promoted
5 April 2024
13:00 (16:00 UTC+5)

Kazakhstan	0–1	Bulgaria
	Report	Petkova 45+5'

FC Kairat Academy, Almaty
Attendance: 213
Referee: Melis Özçiğdem (Turkey)
5 April 2024
13:00 (15:00 UTC+4)

Armenia	0–5	Romania
	Report	Gődér 42'; Vătafu 62'; Taylor 65' (o.g.); Ciolacu 69'; Herczeg 80'

Armavir City Stadium, Armavir
Attendance: 560
Referee: Vanja Janković (Slovenia)

9 April 2024
17:00 (18:00 UTC+3)

Bulgaria	2–3	Armenia
Rasina 61'; Popadinova 85' (pen.)	Report	Kazanchian 42'; Asatryan 49'; Safaryan 90+1'

Stadion Aleksandar Shalamanov, Sofia
Attendance: 237
Referee: Emilie Torkelsen (Norway)
9 April 2024
18:00 (19:00 UTC+3)

Romania	1–0	Kazakhstan
Carp 69'	Report

Stadionul Arcul de Triumf, Bucharest
Attendance: 2,071
Referee: Jeļena Jermolajeva (Latvia)

31 May 2024
15:00 (17:00 UTC+4)

Armenia	2–1	Kazakhstan
Dallakyan 13'; Artin 49' (pen.)	Report	Kulmagambetova 70'

Armavir City Stadium, Armavir
Attendance: 130
Referee: Elena Gobjila (Moldova)
31 May 2024
18:00 (19:00 UTC+3)

Romania	1–0	Bulgaria
Vătafu 76'	Report

Stadionul Arcul de Triumf, Bucharest
Attendance: 1,709
Referee: Kathrin Huber (Austria)

4 June 2024
16:00 (19:00 UTC+5)

Kazakhstan	4–1	Armenia
Burova 28'; Gaistenova 35', 57'; Turlybekova 58'	Report	Artin 39'

Almaty Central Stadium, Almaty
Attendance: 164
Referee: Mzevinari Sharashanidze (Georgia)
4 June 2024
18:00 (19:00 UTC+3)

Bulgaria	0–3	Romania
	Report	Vătafu 39'; Carp 51'; Herczeg 79'

Stadion Aleksandar Shalamanov, Sofia
Attendance: 176
Referee: Jurgita Mačikunytė (Lithuania)

12 July 2024
16:00 (19:00 UTC+5)

Kazakhstan	0–3	Romania
	Report	Carp 17'; Olar 40'; Iordăchiuși 60'

Almaty Central Stadium, Almaty
Attendance: 367
Referee: Lovisa Johansson (Sweden)
12 July 2024
17:45 (19:45 UTC+4)

Armenia	1–3	Bulgaria
Safaryan 75'	Report	Petrova 13'; Karaivanova 26'; Yaneva 90+1'

Vazgen Sargsyan Republican Stadium, Yerevan
Attendance: 419
Referee: Zoe Stavrou (Cyprus)

16 July 2024
19:00 (20:00 UTC+3)

Romania	3–1	Armenia
Ciolacu 38'; Olar 50'; Marcu 74'	Report	Khachatryan 89'

Stadionul Arcul de Triumf, Bucharest
Attendance: 2,139
Referee: María Eugenia Gil Soriano (Spain)
16 July 2024
19:00 (20:00 UTC+3)

Bulgaria	0–0	Kazakhstan
	Report

Stadion Aleksandar Shalamanov, Sofia
Attendance: 228
Referee: Kristina Kozoroh (Ukraine)

=== Group 5 ===
Pos	Team	Pld	W	D	L	GF	GA	GD	Pts	Qualification	(Albania)	(Luxembourg)	(Estonia)
1	Albania (P)	4	3	0	1	8	4	+4	9	Advance to play-offs (unseeded) and promotion to League B	—	3–1	2–0
2	Luxembourg	4	1	2	1	5	6	−1	5	Advance to play-offs (unseeded)	2–1	—	1–1
3	Estonia	4	0	2	2	3	6	−3	2		1–2	1–1	—

Source: UEFA
Rules for classification: Tiebreakers
(P) Promoted
5 April 2024
19:30

Luxembourg	2–1	Albania
Schmit 68'; Thompson 87'	Report	Gjini 43'

Stade Émile Mayrisch, Esch-sur-Alzette
Attendance: 511
Referee: Marina Zechner (Austria)

9 April 2024
20:00

Albania	2–0	Estonia
F. Berisha 31'; Maksuti 90+3'	Report

Arena Kombëtare, Tirana
Attendance: 720
Referee: Anastasiya Romanyuk (Ukraine)

31 May 2024
17:00 (18:00 UTC+3)

Estonia	1–2	Albania
Himanen 17'	Report	F. Berisha 7'; Krasniqi 90+2'

Lilleküla Stadium, Tallinn
Attendance: 934
Referee: Tatyana Sorokopudova (Kazakhstan)

4 June 2024
18:00

Albania	3–1	Luxembourg
Doçi 29' (pen.); Krasniqi 45+2'; F. Berisha 46'	Report	Kremer 90+1'

Elbasan Arena, Elbasan
Attendance: 700
Referee: Melek Dakan (Turkey)

12 July 2024
19:30

Luxembourg	1–1	Estonia
Miller 48'	Report	Tammik 53'

Stade Émile Mayrisch, Esch-sur-Alzette
Attendance: 587
Referee: Tjaša Misja (Slovenia)

16 July 2024
19:00 (20:00 UTC+3)

Estonia	1–1	Luxembourg
Teern 49'	Report	Thompson 18'

Tamme Stadium, Tartu
Attendance: 566
Referee: Teona Sturua (Georgia)

== Ranking of second-placed teams ==
The three best-ranked group runners-up advanced to the play-offs along with the five group winners.

Due to unequal group sizes in League C, results against fourth-placed teams were not considered when comparing teams finishing first, second, or third in their groups.

Rnk	Grp	Team	Pld	W	D	L	GF	GA	GD	Pts	Qualification
1	C5	Luxembourg	4	1	2	1	5	6	−1	5	Advance to play-offs (unseeded)
2	C3	Montenegro	4	1	1	2	10	8	+2	4	Advance to play-offs (unseeded)
3	C1	Georgia	4	1	1	2	3	7	−4	4	Advance to play-offs (unseeded)
4	C4	Bulgaria	4	1	0	3	5	8	−3	3	
5	C2	Latvia	4	1	0	3	5	15	−10	3	

Source: UEFA
Rules for classification: Ranking criteria – not considering results against 4th-placed teams

== League ranking ==
The 19 League C teams were ranked 33rd to 51st overall in the UEFA Women's Euro 2025 qualifying according to their league ranking. The five group winners were promoted to League B for the upcoming 2025 UEFA Women's Nations League.

Due to unequal group sizes in League C, results against fourth-placed teams were not considered when comparing teams finishing first, second, or third in their groups.

Rnk	Grp	Team	Pld	W	D	L	GF	GA	GD	Pts	Promotion
33	C2	Slovenia	4	4	0	0	19	0	+19	12	Promotion to League B
34	C4	Romania	4	4	0	0	12	1	+11	12	Promotion to League B
35	C1	Belarus	4	4	0	0	11	0	+11	12	Promotion to League B
36	C3	Greece	4	3	1	0	8	4	+4	10	Promotion to League B
37	C5	Albania	4	3	0	1	8	4	+4	9	Promotion to League B
38	C5	Luxembourg	4	1	2	1	5	6	−1	5	
39	C3	Montenegro	4	1	1	2	10	8	+2	4	
40	C1	Georgia	4	1	1	2	3	7	−4	4	
41	C4	Bulgaria	4	1	0	3	5	8	−3	3	
42	C2	Latvia	4	1	0	3	5	15	−10	3	
43	C3	Faroe Islands	4	1	0	3	3	9	−6	3	
44	C4	Armenia	4	1	0	3	5	13	−8	3	
45	C2	North Macedonia	4	1	0	3	5	14	−9	3	
46	C5	Estonia	4	0	2	2	3	6	−3	2	
47	C1	Lithuania	4	0	1	3	2	9	−7	1	
48	C4	Kazakhstan	6	1	1	4	5	8	−3	4	
49	C2	Moldova	6	0	1	5	4	15	−11	1	
50	C1	Cyprus	6	0	0	6	1	14	−13	0	
51	C3	Andorra	6	0	0	6	2	28	−26	0	

Source: UEFA
Rules for classification: Ranking criteria – not considering results against 4th-placed teams

== Top goalscorers ==
There were 175 goals scored in 52 matches, for an average of 3.37 goals per match.

8 goals

- (Slovenia) Lara Prašnikar

6 goals

- (Montenegro) Slađana Bulatović
- (Montenegro) Armisa Kuč

5 goals

- (Greece) Sophia Koggouli

4 goals

- (Georgia (country)) Teona Bakradze
- (Greece) Veatriki Sarri
- (Montenegro) Medina Dešić
- (North Macedonia) Nataša Andonova
- (Slovenia) Špela Kolbl
- (Slovenia) Kaja Korošec

3 goals

- (Albania) Fortesa Berisha
- (Greece) Antigoni Papadopoulou
- (Greece) Anastasia Spyridonidou
- (Latvia) Karlīna Miksone
- (Lithuania) Rimantė Jonušaitė
- (Montenegro) Jasna Đoković
- (Romania) Cristina Carp
- (Romania) Ștefania Vătafu

2 goals

- (Albania) Qendresa Krasniqi
- (Armenia) Maral Artin
- (Armenia) Ani Safaryan
- (Belarus) Karina Alkhovik
- (Belarus) Anastasiya Shlapakova
- (Belarus) Anastasia Shuppo
- (Faroe Islands) Sunniva Willemoes Dal Christiansen
- (Faroe Islands) Ásla Johannesen
- (Faroe Islands) Jensa Tórolvsdóttir
- (Kazakhstan) Aida Gaistenova
- (Latvia) Anastasija Poļuhoviča
- (Luxembourg) Amy Thompson
- (Moldova) Carolina Țabur
- (Romania) Mihaela Ciolacu
- (Romania) Andrea Herczeg
- (Romania) Florentina Spânu
- (Slovenia) Nina Kajzba

1 goal

- (Albania) Megi Doçi
- (Albania) Luçije Gjini
- (Albania) Kristina Maksuti
- (Andorra) Erica Gonçalves
- (Andorra) Teresa Morató
- (Armenia) Veronika Asatryan
- (Armenia) Anna Dallakyan
- (Armenia) Lara Kazanchian
- (Armenia) Tatev Khachatryan
- (Belarus) Valeriya Belaya
- (Belarus) Alina Charlionak
- (Belarus) Anna Kozyupa
- (Belarus) Ksenia Kubichnaya
- (Belarus) Darya Maniukova
- (Belarus) Anna Pilipenko
- (Belarus) Viktoriya Valiuk
- (Bulgaria) Kristiana Karaivanova
- (Bulgaria) Simona Petkova
- (Bulgaria) Lora Petrova
- (Bulgaria) Evdokiya Popadinova
- (Bulgaria) Polina Rasina
- (Bulgaria) Aleksandra Yaneva
- (Cyprus) Anna Matsoukari
- (Estonia) Kairi Himanen
- (Estonia) Lisette Tammik
- (Estonia) Kristina Teern
- (Faroe Islands) Petra Hoydal
- (Faroe Islands) Tórunn Joensen
- (Faroe Islands) Eyðvør Klakstein
- (Faroe Islands) Birita Ryan
- (Faroe Islands) Heidi Sevdal
- (Georgia (country)) Maiko Bebia
- (Georgia (country)) Irina Khaburdzania
- (Greece) Anastasia Gkatsou
- (Greece) Eleni Markou
- (Kazakhstan) Alexandra Burova
- (Kazakhstan) Kamila Kulmagambetova
- (Kazakhstan) Asselkhan Turlybekova
- (Latvia) Anastasija Čemirtāne
- (Latvia) Olga Ševcova
- (Lithuania) Ugnė Lazdauskaitė
- (Lithuania) Milda Liužinaitė
- (Luxembourg) Emma Kremer
- (Luxembourg) Laura Miller
- (Luxembourg) Charlotte Schmit
- (Moldova) Claudia Chiper
- (Moldova) Iuliana Colnic
- (Montenegro) Helena Božić
- (Montenegro) Maša Tomašević
- (North Macedonia) Lenche Andreevska
- (North Macedonia) Ulza Maksuti
- (North Macedonia) Gentjana Rochi
- (Romania) Brigitta Gődér
- (Romania) Olga Iordăchiuși
- (Romania) Carmen Marcu
- (Slovenia) Sara Agrež
- (Slovenia) Lana Golob
- (Slovenia) Korina Janež
- (Slovenia) Mirjam Kastelec
- (Slovenia) Zara Kramžar
- (Slovenia) Zala Kuštrin
- (Slovenia) Sara Makovec

1 own goal

- (Armenia) Savannah Taylor (against Romania)
- (Latvia) Anna Kristīne Gornela (against North Macedonia)
- (Latvia) Anastasija Ročāne (against North Macedonia)
- (Moldova) Mădălina Bădiceanu (against North Macedonia)
- (Moldova) Nadejda Colesnicenco (against Latvia)
- (North Macedonia) Viktorija Panchurova (against Slovenia)

Source: UEFA
