= Ksenia Kubichnaya =

Belarusian footballer

Personal information
- Date of birth: 6 March 1999 (age 27)
- Place of birth: Belarus,
- Position: Defender

Team information
- Current team: FC Minsk

Senior career*
Years	Team	Apps	(Gls)
2016–2019	Isloch-RGUOR	64	(17)
2020	FC Minsk	18	(5)
2021	Ryazan-VDV	9	(0)
2021-2022	FC Minsk	13	(2)

International career^{‡}
2017–	Belarus	10	(0)
- * Club domestic league appearances and goals as of 16:40, 31 January 2021 (UTC) ‡ National team caps and goals as of 19:00, 1 March 2020 (UTC)

Ksenia Kubichnaya (born 6 March 1999) is a Belarusian footballer who plays as a defender and has appeared for the Belarus women's national team.

== Career ==
Kubichnaya has been capped for the Belarus national team, appearing for the team during the 2019 FIFA Women's World Cup qualifying cycle.

== International goals ==
No.	Date	Venue	Opponent	Score	Result	Competition
1.	5 April 2024	Dasaki Stadium, Dasaki Achnas, Cyprus	Cyprus	1–0	3–0	UEFA Women's Euro 2025 qualifying
