= UEFA Women's Euro 2025 qualifying play-offs =

Tournament details
- Dates: 25 October 2024 – 3 December 2024
- Teams: 28 (from 1 confederation)

Tournament statistics
- Matches played: 42
- Goals scored: 138 (3.29 per match)
- Attendance: 231,321 (5,508 per match)
- Top scorer(s): (Norway) Frida Maanum (6 goals)

The play-offs of the UEFA Women's Euro 2025 qualifying competition determined the final seven participants of the Women's Euro 2025 final tournament, who joined the eight directly qualified teams and hosts Switzerland.

== Format ==
The play-offs determined the final seven teams that qualified for the final tournament and were played over two rounds.

In the first round, the eight teams finishing third and fourth in League A were seeded, and drawn into ties against the five group winners and three best-ranked runners-up in League C. The eight winners progressed to the second round.

In addition the group winners, runners-up and third-placed teams in League B (except Switzerland) participated in the first round (i.e. the 12 best-ranked League B teams). The six higher-ranked of those teams were seeded and drawn into ties against the six lower-ranked teams. The six winners progressed to the next round.

Switzerland, who competed in League B, were guaranteed a spot in the final tournament as hosts, and therefore did not participate in the play-offs. Since they finished in the top three places in their group, the best-ranked fourth-placed team (i.e. the team ranked 13th in League B) also qualified for the first round.

In the second round, the teams from both paths came together and were drawn into seven ties. The team pairings from the first round ties involving the seven highest-ranked teams, according to the 2024–25 European Qualifiers overall ranking, were seeded in the second round draw (Note: The seven highest-ranked teams in the playoffs were all by definition from League A. If one of those teams had lost to a League C team in the first round, that League C team would have been seeded in the second round, as the winner of the first round tie involving one of the top seven teams. (Regulations Article 27.05b)) and drawn against the seven remaining pairings from the first round.

The seven winners of these ties progressed to the final tournament in Switzerland.

Both rounds of the play-offs were played over two legs, with the seeded teams hosting the second leg. The team that scored more goals on aggregate was the winner. If the aggregate score was level, extra time was played (the away goals rule was not applied). If the score remained level after extra time, a penalty shoot-out was used to decide the winner.

== Draw ==
The play-off draw for both rounds took place on 19 July 2024 at 13:00 CEST in Nyon, Switzerland.

For the first round draw, the League A teams were seeded and drawn into eight ties against the League C teams to form Path 1, and the six best-ranked League B teams were seeded and drawn against the six lower-ranked League B teams to form Path 2.

For the second round draw, teams from both paths came together. The draw took place before the winners of the first round were known, and the first round pairings involving the seven highest-ranked teams, according to the 2024–25 European Qualifiers overall ranking, were seeded and drawn against the seven remaining pairings from the first round.

For all three draws, a team from the unseeded pot was drawn first, and placed into the home position in the first tie, followed by a team drawn from the seeded pot placed into the away position, with the process then repeating until each pot was empty. This ensured that all seeded teams will play their second leg ties at home.

Belarus and Ukraine could not be drawn together, due to Belarusian involvement in the Russian invasion of Ukraine, and the second round draw procedure was adjusted as required to ensure this prohibited clash could not occur.

== Seeding ==
The following teams qualified for the first round of the play-offs, and were seeded as shown.

Round 1: Path 1

Seeded		Unseeded	
Team	Rnk	Team	Rnk
Sweden	9	Slovenia	33
Norway	10	Romania	34
Austria	11	Belarus	35
Belgium	12	Greece	36
Finland	13	Albania	37
Czech Republic	14	Luxembourg	38
Republic of Ireland	15	Montenegro	39
Poland	16	Georgia	40

Round 1: Path 2

Seeded		Unseeded	
Team	Rnk	Team	Rnk
Portugal	17	Turkey	24
Scotland	18	Croatia	25
Wales	20	Hungary	26
Serbia	21	Bosnia and Herzegovina	27
Ukraine	22	Slovakia	28
Northern Ireland	23	Azerbaijan	29

Round 2

The ties for the second round were drawn before the winners of round 1 were known, and were seeded as follows.

Seeded	Unseeded
Winner of path 1 tie involving Sweden	Winner of path 1 tie involving Poland
Winner of path 1 tie involving Norway	Winner of path 2 tie involving Portugal
Winner of path 1 tie involving Austria	Winner of path 2 tie involving Scotland
Winner of path 1 tie involving Belgium	Winner of path 2 tie involving Wales
Winner of path 1 tie involving Finland	Winner of path 2 tie involving Serbia
Winner of path 1 tie involving Czech Republic	Winner of path 2 tie involving Ukraine
Winner of path 1 tie involving Republic of Ireland	Winner of path 2 tie involving Northern Ireland

== Summary ==
=== First round ===
The first round matches took place on 25 and 29 October 2024. Each tie was played over two legs, with the seeded teams playing the second leg at home.

Round 1: Path 1

Team 1	Agg.	Team 2	1st leg	2nd leg
Romania	2–6	Poland	1–2	1–4
Greece	0–5	Belgium	0–0	0–5
Montenegro	0–6	Finland	0–1	0–5
Georgia	0–9	Republic of Ireland	0–6	0–3
Slovenia	1–5	Austria	0–3	1–2
Luxembourg	0–12	Sweden	0–4	0–8
Belarus	1–8	Czech Republic	1–8	0–0
Albania	0–14	Norway	0–5	0–9

Round 1: Path 2

Team 1	Agg.	Team 2	1st leg	2nd leg
Turkey	1–3	Ukraine	1–1	0–2
Croatia	1–2	Northern Ireland	1–1	0–1 (a.e.t.)
Bosnia and Herzegovina	3–6	Serbia	2–2	1–4
Azerbaijan	1–8	Portugal	1–4	0–4
Hungary	0–5	Scotland	0–1	0–4
Slovakia	2–3	Wales	2–1	0–2 (a.e.t.)

=== Second round ===
The second round matches took place on 28/29 November and 3 December 2024. Each tie was played over two legs, with the seeded teams playing the second leg at home.

Team 1	Agg.	Team 2	1st leg	2nd leg
Portugal	3–2	Czech Republic	1–1	2–1
Scotland	0–2	Finland	0–0	0–2
Ukraine	1–4	Belgium	0–2	1–2
Wales	3–2	Republic of Ireland	1–1	2–1
Poland	2–0	Austria	1–0	1–0
Northern Ireland	0–7	Norway	0–4	0–3
Serbia	0–8	Sweden	0–2	0–6

== Matches ==
Times are CEST/CET, (Note: CEST (UTC+2) for the first leg matches of the first round, CET (UTC+1) for all matches thereafter.) as listed by UEFA (local times, if different, are in parentheses).

=== First round: Path 1 ===
25 October 2024
18:00 (19:00 UTC+3)

Romania	1–2	Poland
Bălăceanu 18'	Report	Padilla 73'; Pajor 89' (pen.)

Stadionul Arcul de Triumf, Bucharest
Attendance: 3,076
Referee: Cheryl Foster (Wales)
29 October 2024
18:00

Poland	4–1	Romania
Pajor 19', 49'; Padilla 41'; Krezyman 85'	Report	Stanciu 90+3'

Gdańsk Stadium, Gdańsk
Attendance: 8,449
Referee: Ivana Martinčić (Croatia)

Poland won 6–2 on aggregate and qualified for the second round.

25 October 2024
18:00 (19:00 UTC+3)

Greece	0–0	Belgium
	Report

Theodoros Vardinogiannis Stadium, Heraklion
Attendance: 1,550
Referee: Ainara Acevedo (Spain)
29 October 2024
20:15

Belgium	5–0	Greece
Van Kerkhoven 36', 57'; Wullaert 39', 45+4'; Missipo 55'	Report

Den Dreef, Leuven
Attendance: 5,812
Referee: Volha Blotskaya (Belarus)

Belgium won 5–0 on aggregate and qualified for the second round.

25 October 2024
16:30

Montenegro	0–1	Finland
	Report	Sällström 3'

Podgorica City Stadium, Podgorica
Attendance: 350
Referee: Riem Hussein (Germany)
29 October 2024
17:30 (18:30 UTC+2)

Finland	5–0	Montenegro
Öling 7'; Lehtola 12'; V. Koivisto 31'; Sällström 65'; Halttunen 80'	Report

Tammelan Stadion, Tampere
Attendance: 4,849
Referee: Eleni Antoniou (Greece)

Finland won 6–0 on aggregate and qualified for the second round.

25 October 2024
18:00 (20:00 UTC+4)

Georgia	0–6	Republic of Ireland
	Report	McCabe 37' (pen.), 67'; Carusa 59'; Stapleton 82'; Sheva 90+7'; Mannion 90+10'

M. Meskhi II Stadium, Tbilisi
Attendance: 1,440
Referee: Emanuela Rusta (Albania)
29 October 2024
20:30 (19:30 UTC+0)

Republic of Ireland	3–0	Georgia
Russell 3'; Carusa 31'; McCabe 55'	Report

Tallaght Stadium, Dublin
Attendance: 8,745
Referee: Katalin Kulcsár (Hungary)

Republic of Ireland won 9–0 on aggregate and qualified for the second round.

25 October 2024
18:00

Slovenia	0–3	Austria
	Report	Dunst 69'; Puntigam 73' (pen.); Purtscheller 75'

Bonifika Stadium, Koper
Attendance: 458
Referee: Hristiyana Guteva (Bulgaria)
29 October 2024
18:00

Austria	2–1	Slovenia
Puntigam 62' (pen.), 74' (pen.)	Report	Prašnikar 90+6' (pen.)

Josko Arena, Ried im Innkreis
Attendance: 2,600
Referee: Lina Lehtovaara (Finland)

Austria won 5–1 on aggregate and qualified for the second round.

25 October 2024
19:30

Luxembourg	0–4	Sweden
	Report	Angeldal 26'; Rytting Kaneryd 31'; Blackstenius 81'; Ijeh 90+3'

Stade Émile Mayrisch, Esch-sur-Alzette
Attendance: 1,295
Referee: Alexandra Collin (France)
29 October 2024
19:00

Sweden	8–0	Luxembourg
Angeldal 9', 30' (pen.); Rytting Kaneryd 11'; Zigiotti Olme 40'; Blackstenius 45'; Schmit 45+2' (o.g.); Blomqvist 63', 87'	Report

Gamla Ullevi, Gothenburg
Attendance: 10,523
Referee: Réka Molnar (Hungary)

Sweden won 12–0 on aggregate and qualified for the second round.

25 October 2024
20:30

Belarus	1–8	Czech Republic
Shlapakova 16'	Report	Khýrová 2'; Svitková 6', 20'; K. Dubcová 34', 38'; Stašková 48'; Bartoňová 52'; Černá 75'

Gradski stadion Velika Gorica, Velika Gorica (Croatia) (Note: Due to Belarusian involvement in the Russian invasion of Ukraine, Belarus were required to play their home matches at neutral venues, and behind closed doors.)
Attendance: 10 (behind closed doors)
Referee: Désirée Grundbacher (Switzerland)
29 October 2024
15:00

Czech Republic	0–0	Belarus
	Report

Gradski stadion Velika Gorica, Velika Gorica (Croatia) (Note: Due to Belarusian involvement in the Russian invasion of Ukraine, Belarus were not allowed to enter the Czech Republic by local authorities. As a result, the match was played at a neutral venue.)
Attendance: 18
Referee: Iuliana Demetrescu (Romania)

Czech Republic won 8–1 on aggregate and qualified for the second round.

25 October 2024
16:00

Albania	0–5	Norway
	Report	Maanum 9'; Bergsvand 23', 44'; Hegerberg 62'; Hoxhaj 74' (o.g.)

Loro Boriçi Stadium, Shkodër
Attendance: 2,185
Referee: Ana Maria Terteleac (Romania)
29 October 2024
19:00

Norway	9–0	Albania
Maanum 18', 52', 62', 65'; Naalsund 29'; Hegerberg 44'; Gaupset 75'; Reiten 81' (pen.); Bøe Risa 90+1' (pen.)	Report

Ullevaal Stadion, Oslo
Attendance: 7,682
Referee: Michalina Diakow (Poland)

Norway won 14–0 on aggregate and qualified for the second round.

=== First round: Path 2 ===
25 October 2024
17:00 (18:00 UTC+3)

Turkey	1–1	Ukraine
Keskin 51'	Report	Apanaschenko 31'

Esenler Stadium, Istanbul
Attendance: 1,688
Referee: Henrikke Nervik (Norway)
29 October 2024
17:00 (18:00 UTC+2)

Ukraine	2–0	Turkey
Karataş 14' (o.g.); Shmatko 34'	Report

Stadionul Zimbru, Chișinău (Moldova) (Note: Due to the Russian invasion of Ukraine, Ukraine were required to play their home matches at neutral venues.)
Attendance: 438
Referee: Catarina Campos (Portugal)

Ukraine won 3–1 on aggregate and qualified for the second round.

25 October 2024
19:00

Croatia	1–1	Northern Ireland
Lojna 4' (pen.)	Report	Lojna 90+2' (o.g.)

Stadion Varteks, Varaždin
Attendance: 431
Referee: Sandra Bastos (Portugal)
29 October 2024
20:00 (19:00 UTC+0)

Northern Ireland	1–0 (a.e.t.)	Croatia
Wade 114'	Report

Windsor Park, Belfast
Attendance: 3,935
Referee: Tess Olofsson (Sweden)

Northern Ireland won 2–1 on aggregate and qualified for the second round.

25 October 2024
14:00

Bosnia and Herzegovina	2–2	Serbia
Ekić 20'; Nikolić 52'	Report	Matejić 28'; Milivojević 87'

Bosnia and Herzegovina FA Training Centre, Zenica
Attendance: 423
Referee: Silvia Gasperotti (Italy)
29 October 2024
19:00

Serbia	4–1	Bosnia and Herzegovina
Stokić 10'; Matejić 42', 62'; Filipović 75'	Report	Nikolić 29'

Serbian FA Sports Center, Stara Pazova
Attendance: 650
Referee: Marta Huerta De Aza (Spain)

Serbia won 6–3 on aggregate and qualified for the second round.

25 October 2024
14:00 (16:00 UTC+4)

Azerbaijan	1–4	Portugal
Parlak 58'	Report	Capeta 5'; T. Pinto 10'; D. Gomes 26'; Diana Silva 89'

Dalga Arena, Baku
Attendance: 253
Referee: Fabienne Michel (Germany)
29 October 2024
20:45 (19:45 UTC+0)

Portugal	4–0	Azerbaijan
Diana Silva 15', 26'; Dolores Silva 57' (pen.); F. Pinto 86'	Report

Estádio do Futebol Clube de Vizela, Vizela
Attendance: 4,535
Referee: Shona Shukrula (Netherlands)

Portugal won 8–1 on aggregate and qualified for the second round.

25 October 2024
18:15

Hungary	0–1	Scotland
	Report	Thomas 60'

Bozsik Aréna, Budapest
Attendance: 1,213
Referee: Maria Caputi (Italy)
29 October 2024
20:35 (19:35 UTC+0)

Scotland	4–0	Hungary
Brzykcy 17' (o.g.); Cuthbert 31'; Weir 55'; Thomas 65'	Report

Easter Road, Edinburgh
Attendance: 7,176
Referee: Ivana Projkovska (North Macedonia)

Scotland won 5–0 on aggregate and qualified for the second round.

25 October 2024
17:30

Slovakia	2–1	Wales
Šurnovská 49'; Mikolajová 58'	Report	Morgan 89'

NTC Poprad, Poprad
Attendance: 2,013
Referee: Stéphanie Frappart (France)
29 October 2024
20:15 (19:15 UTC+0)

Wales	2–0 (a.e.t.)	Slovakia
Fishlock 39'; Holland 112'	Report

Cardiff City Stadium, Cardiff
Attendance: 10,504
Referee: Ewa Augustyn (Poland)

Wales won 3–2 on aggregate and qualified for the second round.

=== Second round ===
29 November 2024
20:45 (19:45 UTC+0)

Portugal	1–1	Czech Republic
Kika 47'	Report	Svitková 33'

Estádio do Dragão, Porto
Attendance: 40,189
Referee: Silvia Gasperotti (Italy)
3 December 2024
17:45

Czech Republic	1–2	Portugal
Svitková 35' (pen.)	Report	Diana Silva 13', 76'

Na Stínadlech, Teplice
Attendance: 5,203
Referee: Lina Lehtovaara (Finland)

Portugal won 3–2 on aggregate and qualified for the final tournament.

29 November 2024
20:35 (19:35 UTC+0)

Scotland	0–0	Finland
	Report

Easter Road, Edinburgh
Attendance: 8,790
Referee: Alina Peşu (Romania)
3 December 2024
18:15 (19:15 UTC+2)

Finland	2–0	Scotland
Kuikka 8'; Lehtola 28'	Report

Bolt Arena, Helsinki
Attendance: 7,259
Referee: Ewa Augustyn (Poland)

Finland won 2–0 on aggregate and qualified for the final tournament.

29 November 2024
18:00 (20:00 UTC+3)

Ukraine	0–2	Belgium
	Report	Van Kerkhoven 21'; Wullaert 90+3'

Mardan Sports Complex, Antalya (Turkey)
Attendance: 312
Referee: Hristiyana Guteva (Bulgaria)
3 December 2024
20:15

Belgium	2–1	Ukraine
Toloba 67'; Wullaert 90'	Report	Shmatko 79'

Den Dreef, Leuven
Attendance: 4,027
Referee: Iuliana Demetrescu (Romania)

Belgium won 4–1 on aggregate and qualified for the final tournament.

29 November 2024
20:15 (19:15 UTC+0)

Wales	1–1	Republic of Ireland
Woodham 21'	Report	Clark 35' (o.g.)

Cardiff City Stadium, Cardiff
Attendance: 16,845
Referee: Maria Sole Ferrieri Caputi (Italy)
3 December 2024
20:30 (19:30 UTC+0)

Republic of Ireland	1–2	Wales
Patten 86'	Report	Cain 50' (pen.); Jones 67'

Aviva Stadium, Dublin
Attendance: 25,832
Referee: Marta Huerta De Aza (Spain)

Wales won 3–2 on aggregate and qualified for the final tournament.

29 November 2024
18:00

Poland	1–0	Austria
Padilla 57'	Report

Gdańsk Stadium, Gdańsk
Attendance: 7,025
Referee: Olatz Rivera Olmedo (Spain)
3 December 2024
18:15

Austria	0–1	Poland
	Report	Pajor 90+4'

Franz Horr Stadium, Vienna
Attendance: 3,200
Referee: Ivana Projkovska (North Macedonia)

Poland won 2–0 on aggregate and qualified for the final tournament.

29 November 2024
20:00 (19:00 UTC+0)

Northern Ireland	0–4	Norway
	Report	Graham Hansen 7', 26'; Hansen 14'; Bergsvand 67'

Inver Park, Larne
Attendance: 1,866
Referee: Ivana Martinčić (Croatia)
3 December 2024
18:00

Norway	3–0	Northern Ireland
Graham Hansen 13'; Maanum 47'; Jensen 78'	Report

Ullevaal Stadion, Oslo
Attendance: 3,155
Referee: Jelena Cvetković (Serbia)

Norway won 7–0 on aggregate and qualified for the final tournament.

28 November 2024
18:00

Serbia	0–2	Sweden
	Report	Bennison 54'; Kafaji 70'

Dubočica Stadium, Leskovac
Attendance: 2,939
Referee: Catarina Campos (Portugal)
3 December 2024
19:00

Sweden	6–0	Serbia
Angeldahl 16' (pen.); Asllani 19'; Blackstenius 26', 45+4'; Bennison 57'; Anvegård 90'	Report

Tele2 Arena, Stockholm
Attendance: 12,378
Referee: Eleni Antoniou (Greece)

Sweden won 8–0 on aggregate and qualified for the final tournament.

== Top goalscorers ==
There were 138 goals scored in 42 matches, for an average of 3.29 goals per match.

6 goals

- (Norway) Frida Maanum

5 goals

- (Portugal) Diana Silva

4 goals

- (Belgium) Tessa Wullaert
- (Czech Republic) Kateřina Svitková
- (Poland) Ewa Pajor
- (Sweden) Filippa Angeldal
- (Sweden) Stina Blackstenius

3 goals

- (Austria) Sarah Puntigam
- (Belgium) Ella Van Kerkhoven
- (Norway) Guro Bergsvand
- (Norway) Caroline Graham Hansen
- (Poland) Natalia Padilla
- (Republic of Ireland) Katie McCabe
- (Serbia) Nina Matejić

2 goals

- (Bosnia and Herzegovina) Milena Nikolić
- (Czech Republic) Kamila Dubcová
- (Finland) Nea Lehtola
- (Finland) Linda Sällström
- (Norway) Ada Hegerberg
- (Republic of Ireland) Kyra Carusa
- (Scotland) Martha Thomas
- (Sweden) Hanna Bennison
- (Sweden) Rebecka Blomqvist
- (Sweden) Johanna Rytting Kaneryd
- (Ukraine) Lyubov Shmatko

1 goal

- (Austria) Barbara Dunst
- (Austria) Lilli Purtscheller
- (Azerbaijan) Nazlican Parlak
- (Belarus) Anastasiya Shlapakova
- (Belgium) Kassandra Missipo
- (Belgium) Mariam Toloba
- (Bosnia and Herzegovina) Emina Ekic
- (Croatia) Izabela Lojna
- (Czech Republic) Eva Bartoňová
- (Czech Republic) Franny Černá
- (Czech Republic) Michaela Khýrová
- (Czech Republic) Andrea Stašková
- (Finland) Lilli Halttunen
- (Finland) Vilma Koivisto
- (Finland) Natalia Kuikka
- (Finland) Ria Öling
- (Norway) Vilde Bøe Risa
- (Norway) Signe Gaupset
- (Norway) Tuva Hansen
- (Norway) Synne Jensen
- (Norway) Lisa Naalsund
- (Norway) Guro Reiten
- (Northern Ireland) Lauren Wade
- (Poland) Nadia Krezyman
- (Portugal) Ana Capeta
- (Portugal) Diana Gomes
- (Portugal) Kika Nazareth
- (Portugal) Fátima Pinto
- (Portugal) Tatiana Pinto
- (Portugal) Dolores Silva
- (Republic of Ireland) Aoife Mannion
- (Republic of Ireland) Anna Patten
- (Republic of Ireland) Julie-Ann Russell
- (Republic of Ireland) Marissa Sheva
- (Republic of Ireland) Jessie Stapleton
- (Romania) Ioana Bălăceanu
- (Romania) Ana Maria Stanciu
- (Scotland) Erin Cuthbert
- (Scotland) Caroline Weir
- (Serbia) Tijana Filipović
- (Serbia) Vesna Milivojević
- (Serbia) Sara Stokić
- (Slovakia) Mária Mikolajová
- (Slovakia) Martina Šurnovská
- (Slovenia) Lara Prašnikar
- (Sweden) Anna Anvegård
- (Sweden) Kosovare Asllani
- (Sweden) Evelyn Ijeh
- (Sweden) Rosa Kafaji
- (Sweden) Julia Zigiotti Olme
- (Turkey) Elif Keskin
- (Ukraine) Daryna Apanaschenko
- (Wales) Hannah Cain
- (Wales) Jess Fishlock
- (Wales) Ceri Holland
- (Wales) Carrie Jones
- (Wales) Ffion Morgan
- (Wales) Lily Woodham

1 own goal

- (Albania) Kristina Hoxhaj (against Norway)
- (Croatia) Izabela Lojna (against Northern Ireland)
- (Hungary) Lauren Brzykcy (against Scotland)
- (Luxembourg) Leila Schmit (against Sweden)
- (Turkey) Eda Karataş (against Ukraine)
- (Wales) Olivia Clark (against the Republic of Ireland)

Source: UEFA
