= Anastasia Shuppo =

Belarusian footballer

Personal information
- Date of birth: 15 November 1997 (age 28)
- Place of birth: Krychaw, Belarus
- Height: 1.64 m (5 ft 5 in)
- Position: Midfielder

Team information
- Current team: Dinamo Minsk

Senior career*
| Years | Team | Apps | (Gls) |
| 2014–2016 | Bobruichanka | 54 | (8) |
| 2016–2017 | Medyk Konin | | |
| 2018–2019 | FC Minsk | 40 | (43) |
| 2020 | Dinamo Minsk | 16 | (15) |
| 2021 | Zenit | 21 | (5) |
| 2022– | Dinamo Minsk | 66 | (56) |

International career^{‡}
| | Belarus | 13 | (2) |
- * Club domestic league appearances and goals as of 26 November 2024 (UTC) ‡ National team caps and goals as of 00:50, 4 May 2020 (UTC)

Anastasia Shuppo (born 15 November 1997) is a Belarusian footballer who plays as a midfielder for Belarusian Premier League club Dinamo Minsk and the Belarus women's national team.

== Career ==
Shuppo has been capped for the Belarus national team, appearing for the team during the 2019 FIFA Women's World Cup qualifying cycle.

== Career statistics ==
=== International ===
Scores and results list Belarus' goal tally first, score column indicates score after each Shuppo goal.

List of international goals scored by Anastasia Shuppo
| No. | Date | Venue | Opponent | Score | Result | Competition |
|---|---|---|---|---|---|---|
| 1 | 8 April 2021 | AGMK Stadium, Olmaliq, Uzbekistan | India | 1–0 | 2–1 | Friendly |
| 2 | 17 September 2021 | Dinamo Stadium, Minsk, Belarus | Cyprus | 2–0 | 4–1 | 2023 FIFA Women's World Cup qualification |
| 3 | 5 April 2024 | Dasaki Stadium, Dasaki Achnas, Cyprus | Cyprus | 2–0 | 3–0 | UEFA Women's Euro 2025 qualifying |
| 4 | 28 June 2025 | Torpedo Stadium, Zhodzina, Belarus | Azerbaijan | 1–0 | 3–0 | Friendly |
| 5 | 25 October 2025 | National Stadium, Ta'Qali, Malta | Malta | 2–0 | 2–0 | Friendly |

== Honours ==
Medyk Konin

- Ekstraliga: 2016–17
- Polish Cup: 2016–17
