= Guściora =

Guściora is a Polish surname. Notable people with the surname include:

- Agata Guściora (born 1994), Polish footballer
- Reed Gusciora (born 1960), American politician
