= Anna Kozyupa =

Belarusian footballer

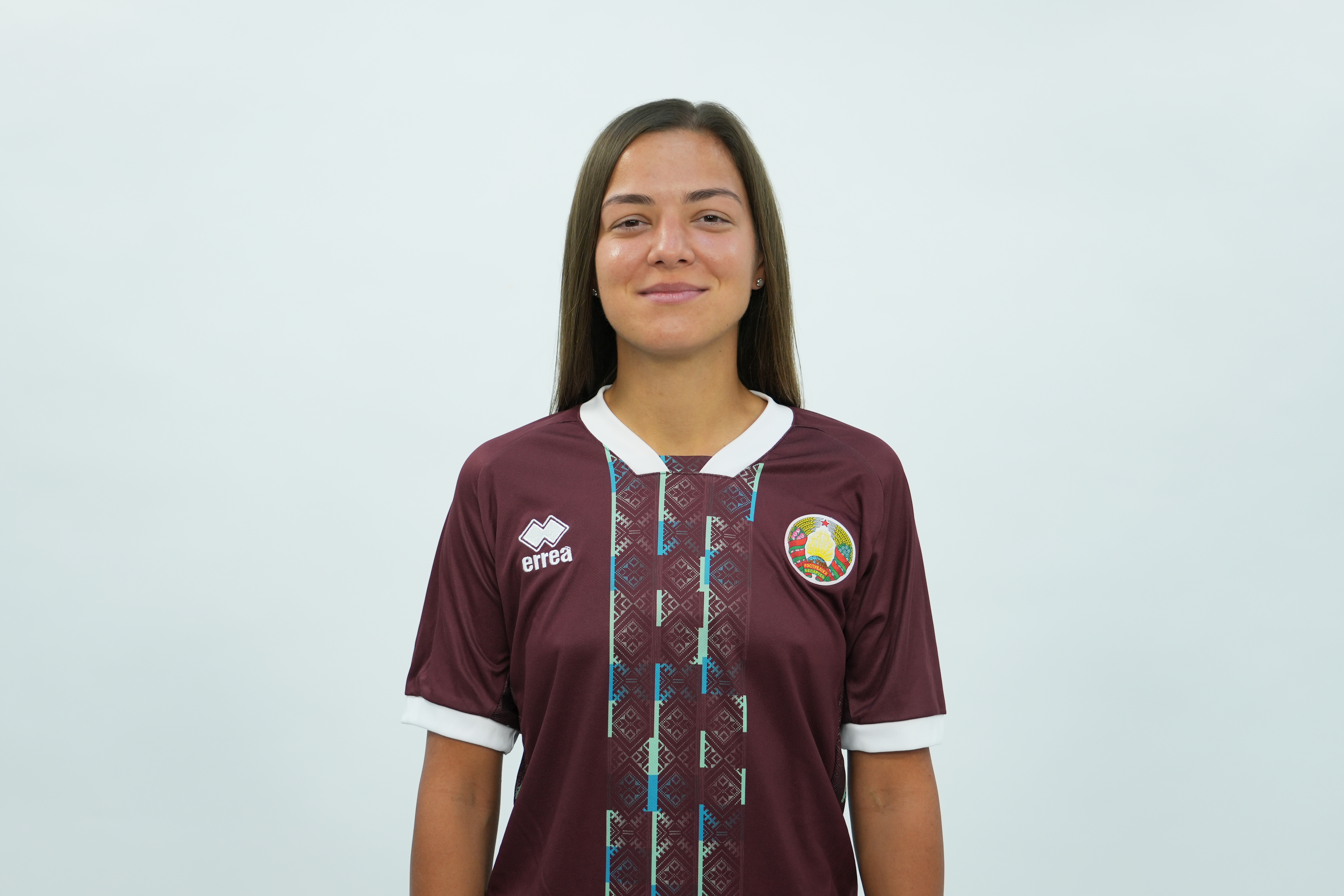

Personal information
- Full name: Anna Kozyupa
- Date of birth: 7 March 1995 (age 31)
- Place of birth: Brest, Belarus
- Position: Defender

Team information
- Current team: Lokomotiv Moscow

Senior career*
Years	Team	Apps	(Gls)
2010–2013	Viktorya-86 Brest	65	(26)
2015–2017	FC Minsk	30	(1)
2018	RGUOR	21	(17)
2019–2020	FC Minsk	36	(10)
2021–2022	Split		
2023–	Lokomotiv Moscow	38	(3)

International career^{‡}
2011	Belarus U17	3	(0)
2011–2014	Belarus U19	11	(1)
2014–	Belarus	21	(2)
- * Club domestic league appearances and goals as of 20 May 2025 ‡ National team caps and goals as of 00:55, 4 May 2020 (UTC)

Anna Kozyupa (born 7 March 1995) is a Belarusian football defender currently playing for Lokomotiv Moscow.

== International goals ==
No.	Date	Venue	Opponent	Score	Result	Competition
1.	17 September 2021	Dinamo Stadium, Minsk, Belarus	Cyprus	1–0	4–1	2023 FIFA Women's World Cup qualification
2.	9 April 2024	Dasaki Stadium, Dasaki Achnas, Cyprus	Georgia	3–0	3–0	UEFA Women's Euro 2025 qualifying
3.	30 November 2024	UFA Football Pitch, Tashkent, Uzbekistan	Uzbekistan	1–0	1–0	Friendly
