= Anastasiya Shlapakova =

Belarusian footballer

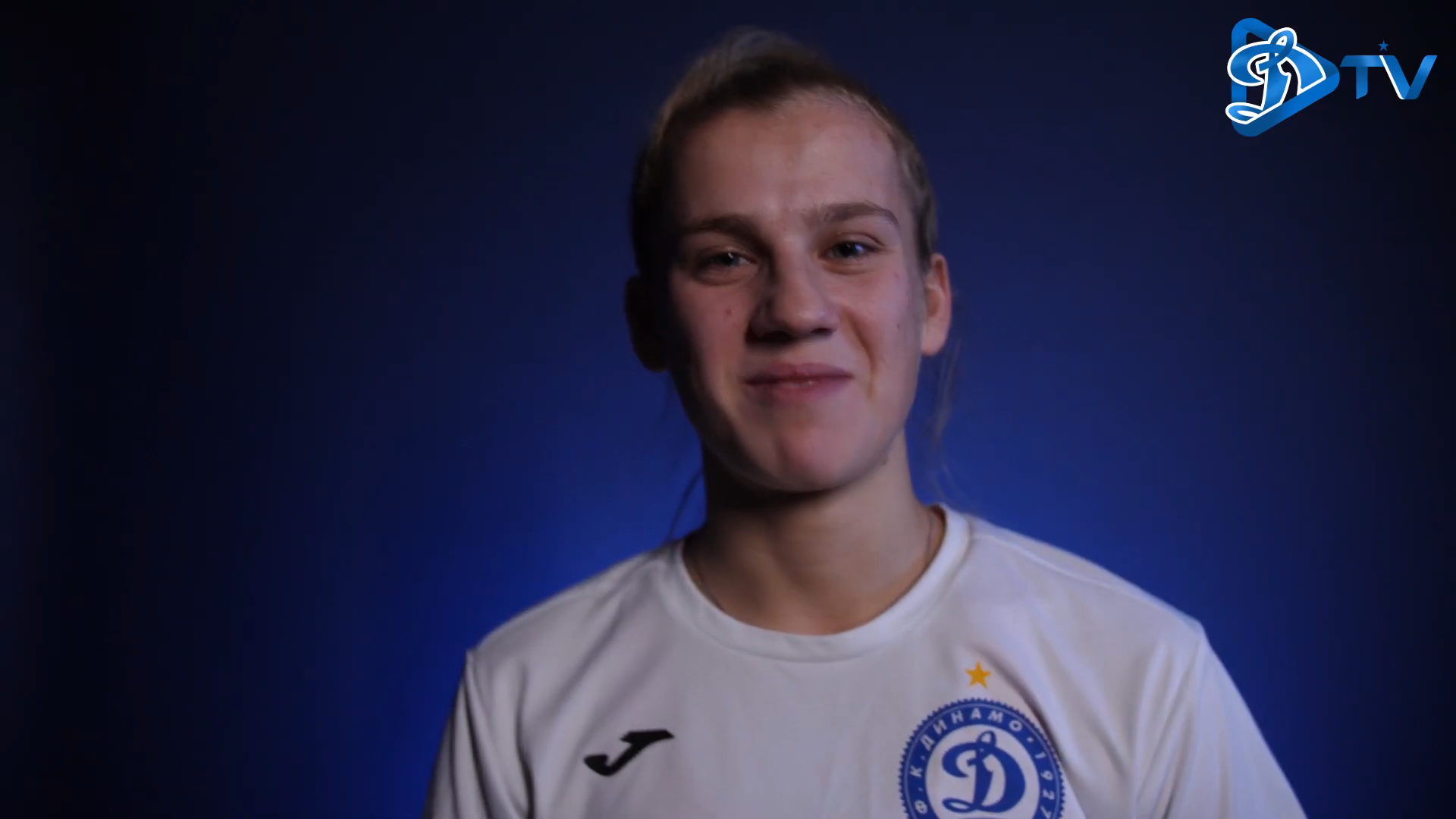

Personal information
- Date of birth: 6 March 2000 (age 26)
- Place of birth: Olsevichi, Belarus
- Height: 1.67 m (5 ft 6 in)
- Position: Midfielder

Team information
- Current team: Dynamo Moscow
- Number: 44

Senior career*
Years	Team	Apps	(Gls)
2016–2019	Isloch-RGUOR	63	(30)
2020–2023	Dinamo Minsk	29	(18)
2024	Zvezda-2005	23	(4)
2025	Dynamo Moscow	9	(0)

International career^{‡}
2018-	Belarus	8	(2)
- * Club domestic league appearances and goals as of 2O May 2025 ‡ National team caps and goals as of 19:45, 20 June 2021 (UTC)

Anastasiya Shlapakova (born 6 March 2000) is a Belarusian footballer who plays as a midfielder for Russian Women's Football Championship club Dynamo Moscow and the Belarus women's national team.

== Career ==
Shlapakova has been capped for the Belarus national team, appearing for the team during the 2019 FIFA Women's World Cup qualifying cycle.

== International goals ==
No.	Date	Venue	Opponent	Score	Result	Competition
1.	22 September 2020	Tórsvøllur, Tórshavn, Faroe Islands	Faroe Islands	2–0	2–0	UEFA Women's Euro 2022 qualifying
2.	11 April 2021	AGMK Stadium, Olmaliq, Uzbekistan	Uzbekistan	1–1	3–1	Friendly
3.	17 September 2021	Dinamo Stadium, Minsk, Belarus	Cyprus	4–1	4–1	2023 FIFA Women's World Cup qualification
4.	10 October 2022	Borisov Arena, Barysaw, Belarus	Russia	2–2	2–2	Friendly
5.	5 April 2024	Dasaki Stadium, Dasaki Achnas, Cyprus	Cyprus	3–0	3–0	UEFA Women's Euro 2025 qualifying
6.	9 April 2024	Dasaki Stadium, Dasaki Achnas, Cyprus	Georgia	1–0	3–0	UEFA Women's Euro 2025 qualifying
7.	25 October 2024	Gradski stadion Velika Gorica, Velika Gorica, Croatia	Czech Republic	1–2	1–8	UEFA Women's Euro 2025 qualifying play-offs
8.	28 June 2025	Torpedo Stadium, Zhodzina, Belarus	Azerbaijan	2–0	3–0	Friendly
9.	1 July 2025	Traktar Stadium, Minsk, Belarus	Azerbaijan	2–0	2–0	Friendly
10.	25 October 2025	National Stadium, Ta'Qali, Malta	Malta	1–0	2–0	Friendly
11.	14 April 2026	Vazgen Sargsyan Republican Stadium, Yerevan, Armenia	Armenia	2–0	3–0	2027 FIFA Women's World Cup qualification
