= 2023 FIFA Women's World Cup qualification – UEFA Group C =

Football tournament qualification stage

UEFA Group C of the 2023 FIFA Women's World Cup qualification competition consists of five teams: Netherlands, Iceland, Czech Republic, Belarus, and Cyprus. The composition of the nine groups in the qualifying group stage was decided by the draw held on 30 April 2021, with the teams seeded according to their coefficient ranking.

The group is played in home-and-away round-robin format between 17 September 2021 and 6 September 2022, with a pause for the Women's Euro 2022 in July. The group winners qualify for the final tournament, while the runners-up advance to the play-offs second round if they are one of the three best runners-up among all nine groups (counting results against the fifth-placed team).

Due to the Belarus' involvement in the Russian invasion of Ukraine, the country is required to play its home matches at neutral venues behind closed doors until further notice. The Dutch Football Association has announced that the representative teams of the Netherlands will not play against national teams of Russia and Belarus until further notice. However on 6 May 2022, they announced the Netherlands would play the match against Belarus behind closed doors on 28 June 2022.

== Standings ==
Pos	Team	Pld	W	D	L	GF	GA	GD	Pts	Qualification	(Netherlands)	(Iceland)	(Czech Republic)	(Belarus)	(Cyprus)
1	Netherlands	8	6	2	0	31	3	+28	20	2023 FIFA Women's World Cup	—	1–0	1–1	3–0	12–0
2	Iceland	8	6	0	2	25	3	+22	18	Play-offs	0–2	—	4–0	6–0	5–0
3	Czech Republic	8	3	2	3	25	10	+15	11		2–2	0–1	—	7–0	8–0
4	Belarus	8	2	1	5	7	26	−19	7		0–2	0–5	2–1	—	4–1
5	Cyprus	8	0	1	7	2	48	−46	1		0–8	0–4	0–6	1–1	—

Source: UEFA
Rules for classification: Tiebreakers

== Matches ==
Times are CET/CEST, (Note: CEST (UTC+2) for dates between 28 March and 31 October 2021 and between 27 March and 30 October 2022, and CET (UTC+1) for all other dates.) as listed by UEFA (local times, if different, are in parentheses).

17 September 2021
17:00 (18:00 EEST)

Belarus	4–1	Cyprus
Kozyupa 6'; Shuppo 45+4' (pen.); Pilipenko 51'; Shlapakova 59'	Report (FIFA); Report (UEFA)	Violari 57'

Dinamo Stadium, Minsk
Referee: Marina Krupskaya (Russia)
17 September 2021
20:45

Netherlands	1–1	Czech Republic
Miedema 83'	Report (FIFA); Report (UEFA)	Stašková 47'

Euroborg, Groningen
Attendance: 10,600
Referee: Ivana Martinčić (Croatia)

21 September 2021
17:30

Czech Republic	8–0	Cyprus
Stašková 10', 63'; Charalambous 12' (o.g.); K. Dubcová 26'; Krejčiříková 42'; L. Martínková 56', 65'; Cvrčková 90+3'	Report (FIFA); Report (UEFA)

Stadion u Nisy, Liberec
Attendance: 285
Referee: Henrikke Nervik (Norway)
21 September 2021
20:45 (18:45 WET)

Iceland	0–2	Netherlands
	Report (FIFA); Report (UEFA)	Van de Donk 23'; Groenen 65'

Laugardalsvöllur, Reykjavík
Referee: Rebecca Welch (England)

22 October 2021
20:45 (21:45 EEST)

Cyprus	0–8	Netherlands
	Report (FIFA); Report (UEFA)	Miedema 3'; Van de Donk 11'; Roord 19', 49', 53'; Charalambous 51' (o.g.); Smits 81'; Van Dongen 87'

AEK Arena – Georgios Karapatakis, Larnaca
Referee: Triinu Laos (Estonia)
22 October 2021
20:45 (18:45 WET)

Iceland	4–0	Czech Republic
Votíková 12' (o.g.); Brynjarsdóttir 59'; Guðmundsdóttir 81'; G. Jónsdóttir 83'	Report (FIFA); Report (UEFA)

Laugardalsvöllur, Reykjavík
Referee: Lina Lehtovaara (Finland)

26 October 2021

Belarus	0–2	Netherlands
	Report (FIFA); Report (UEFA)	Martens 71'; Van de Donk 75'

Dinamo Stadium, Minsk
Referee: Araksya Saribekyan (Armenia)
26 October 2021
20:45 (18:45 WET)

Iceland	5–0	Cyprus
Brynjarsdóttir 14'; S. Jónsdóttir 21', 55'; Vilhjálmsdóttir 45+1'; Jóhannsdóttir 64'	Report (FIFA); Report (UEFA)

Laugardalsvöllur, Reykjavík
Referee: Anastasiya Romanyuk (Ukraine)

26 November 2021
18:00 (19:00 EET)

Cyprus	1–1	Belarus
Savva 60'	Report (FIFA); Report (UEFA)	Pilipenko 24'

AEK Arena – Georgios Karapatakis, Larnaca
Referee: Irena Velevačkoska (North Macedonia)
27 November 2021 (Note: Postponed one day due to snow.)
12:00

Czech Republic	2–2	Netherlands
Svitková 11'; Necidová 60'	Report (FIFA); Report (UEFA)	Van de Donk 51'; Van der Gragt 90+3'

Městský station, Ostrava
Referee: Ewa Augustyn (Poland)

30 November 2021
18:00 (19:00 EET)

Cyprus	0–4	Iceland
	Report (FIFA); Report (UEFA)	Vilhjálmsdóttir 7'; Thorvaldsdóttir 16' (pen.); S. Jónsdóttir 37'; Gudr. Arnardóttir 61'

AEK Arena – Georgios Karapatakis, Larnaca
Referee: Louise Thompson (Northern Ireland)

7 April 2022
18:00

Belarus	0–5	Iceland
	Report (FIFA); Report (UEFA)	Brynjarsdóttir 16'; G. Jónsdóttir 24'; Thorvaldsdóttir 25'; Vilhjálmsdóttir 48', 57'

Voždovac Stadium, Belgrade (Serbia) (Note: Due to the country's involvement in the Russian invasion of Ukraine, Belarus is required to play its home matches at neutral venues behind closed doors until further notice.)
Attendance: 0
Referee: Jelena Pejković (Croatia)
8 April 2022
20:45

Netherlands	12–0	Cyprus
Miedema 23', 41', 44', 54', 69', 76'; Roord 26', 34', 56'; Beerensteyn 52'; Spitse 60'; Brugts 77'	Report (FIFA); Report (UEFA)

Euroborg, Groningen
Referee: Alexandra Collin (France)

12 April 2022
17:30

Czech Republic	0–1	Iceland
	Report (FIFA); Report (UEFA)	G. Jónsdóttir 36'

Na Stínadlech, Teplice
Referee: Lorraine Watson (Scotland)

24 June 2022
19:00

Belarus	2–1	Czech Republic
Valiuk 8', 19'	Report (FIFA); Report (UEFA)	Szewieczková 29'

Čukarički Stadium, Belgrade (Serbia)
Attendance: 0
Referee: Kristina Georgieva (Bulgaria)

28 June 2022 (Note: The Royal Dutch Football Association (KNVB) initially announced that it would boycott the match against Belarus because of Belarus' involvement in the Russian invasion of Ukraine. On 6 May 2022, the KNVB announced in a statement that it still wanted to play the match against Belarus on 28 June 2022.)
20:45

Netherlands	3–0	Belarus
Roord 13'; Nouwen 59'; Beerensteyn 85'	Report (FIFA); Report (UEFA)

FC Twente Stadion, Enschede
Attendance: 0
Referee: Simona Ghisletta (Switzerland)

1 September 2022
19:00 (20:00 EEST)

Cyprus	0–6	Czech Republic
	Report (FIFA); Report (UEFA)	Martínková 10'; Dubcová 18'; Khýrová 21'; Szewieczková 45'; Svitková 78'; Stašková 80'

AEK Arena – Georgios Karapatakis, Larnaca
Referee: Zulema Gonzalez Gonzalez (Spain)
2 September 2022
19:30 (17:30 WET)

Iceland	6–0	Belarus
Gunnarsdóttir 12' (pen.), 15'; Brynjarsdóttir 47', 81'; Viggósdóttir 71'; Magnúsdóttir 82'	Report (FIFA); Report (UEFA)

Laugardalsvöllur, Reykjavík
Referee: Karoline Wacker (Germany)

6 September 2022 (Note: The match was originally scheduled for 30 November 2021, but was postponed until 6 September 2022 due to COVID-19 pandemic.)
18:00 (19:00 EEST)

Czech Republic	7–0	Belarus
Svitková 28', 31'; Dubcová 41'; Khýrová 50'; Sonntagová 68'; Mrázová 90+1'; Dlasková 90+3'	Report (FIFA); Report (UEFA)

Antonis Papadopoulos Stadium, Larnaca (Cyprus) (Note: Due to the country's involvement in the Russian invasion of Ukraine, Belarus were not allowed to enter the Czech Republic by local authorities. As a result, the match was played at a neutral venue.)
Referee: Victoria Beyer (France)
6 September 2022
20:45

Netherlands	1–0	Iceland
Brugts 90+3'	Report (FIFA); Report (UEFA)

Stadion Galgenwaard, Utrecht
Referee: Rebecca Welch (England)

== Goalscorers ==
There were 90 goals scored in 20 matches, for an average of 4.5 goals per match.

8 goals

- (Netherlands) Vivianne Miedema

7 goals

- (Netherlands) Jill Roord

5 goals

- (Iceland) Dagný Brynjarsdóttir

4 goals

- (Czech Republic) Andrea Stašková
- (Czech Republic) Kateřina Svitková
- (Iceland) Karólína Lea Vilhjálmsdóttir
- (Netherlands) Daniëlle van de Donk

3 goals

- (Czech Republic) Kamila Dubcová
- (Czech Republic) Lucie Martínková
- (Iceland) Gunnhildur Yrsa Jónsdóttir
- (Iceland) Sveindís Jane Jónsdóttir

2 goals

- (Belarus) Anna Pilipenko
- (Belarus) Viktoryia Valiuk
- (Czech Republic) Michaela Khýrová
- (Czech Republic) Tereza Szewieczková
- (Iceland) Sara Björk Gunnarsdóttir
- (Iceland) Berglind Björg Þorvaldsdóttir
- (Netherlands) Lineth Beerensteyn
- (Netherlands) Esmee Brugts

1 goal

- (Belarus) Anna Kozyupa
- (Belarus) Anastasiya Shlapakova
- (Belarus) Anastasia Shuppo
- (Cyprus) Filippa Savva
- (Cyprus) Antri Violari
- (Czech Republic) Klára Cvrčková
- (Czech Republic) Anna Dlasková
- (Czech Republic) Tereza Krejčiříková
- (Czech Republic) Miroslava Mrázová
- (Czech Republic) Simona Necidová
- (Czech Republic) Eliška Sonntagová
- (Iceland) Gudrún Arnardóttir
- (Iceland) Svava Rós Guðmundsdóttir
- (Iceland) Alexandra Jóhannsdóttir
- (Iceland) Selma Sól Magnúsdóttir
- (Iceland) Glódís Perla Viggósdóttir
- (Netherlands) Merel van Dongen
- (Netherlands) Stefanie van der Gragt
- (Netherlands) Jackie Groenen
- (Netherlands) Lieke Martens
- (Netherlands) Aniek Nouwen
- (Netherlands) Joëlle Smits
- (Netherlands) Sherida Spitse

1 own goal

- (Czech Republic) Barbora Votíková (against Iceland)

2 own goals

- (Cyprus) Chara Charalambous (against Czech Republic and Netherlands)
