= Zarina Kapustina =

Belarusian footballer

Personal information
- Date of birth: 15 November 1998 (age 27)
- Place of birth: Belarus,
- Position: Midfielder

Team information
- Current team: Dnepr Mogilev

Senior career*
Years	Team	Apps	(Gls)
2015–2017	Nadezhda	43	(6)
2018	Isloch-RGUOR	3	(0)
2021–	Dnepr Mogilev	48	(21)

International career^{‡}
2017–	Belarus	3	(0)
- * Club domestic league appearances and goals as of 21:35, 27 November 2022 (UTC) ‡ National team caps and goals as of 19:27, 30 August 2019 (UTC)

Zarina Kapustina (born 15 November 1998) is a Belarusian footballer who plays as a midfielder and has appeared for the Belarus women's national team.

== Career ==
Kapustina has been capped for the Belarus national team, appearing for the team during the 2019 FIFA Women's World Cup qualifying cycle.
