= Carolina Țabur =

Moldovan footballer (born 1998)

Personal information
- Date of birth: 28 December 1998 (age 27)
- Place of birth: Moldova
- Position: Midfielder

Team information
- Current team: Olimpia Cluj
- Number: 7

Senior career*
Years	Team	Apps	(Gls)
- FC Noroc
2018	Gintra Universitetas FC		
2020-2023	Olimpia Cluj		
2023-2024	Universitatea Cluj		
2024-	Farul Constanța		

International career^{‡}
	Moldova	60	(7)
- * Club domestic league appearances and goals as of 19:44, 30 August 2019 (UTC) ‡ National team caps and goals as of 9 June 2026

Carolina Țabur (born 28 December 1998) is a Moldovan footballer who plays as a midfielder and has appeared for the Moldova women's national team.

== Career ==
Țabur has been capped for the Moldova national team, appearing for the team during the 2019 FIFA Women's World Cup qualifying cycle.

== International goals ==
No.	Date	Venue	Opponent	Score	Result	Competition
1	8 April 2017	LFF Stadium, Vilnius, Lithuania	Lithuania	2–0	2–0	2019 FIFA Women's World Cup qualification
2	10 November 2019	Zimbru Stadium, Chișinău, Moldova	Azerbaijan	1–0	3–1	UEFA Women's Euro 2022 qualifying
3	28 June 2022	Zimbru Stadium, Chișinău, Moldova	Lithuania	1–1	1–1	2023 FIFA Women's World Cup qualification
4	31 May 2024	Petar Miloševski Training Centre, Skopje, North Macedonia	North Macedonia	1–1	1–1	UEFA Women's Euro 2025 qualifying
5	4 June 2024	Zimbru Stadium, Chișinău, Moldova	North Macedonia	1–1	2–4	UEFA Women's Euro 2025 qualifying
6	21 February 2025	Nisporeni Central Stadium, Nisporeni, Moldova	Gibraltar	1–0	1–0	2025 UEFA Women's Nations League
7	9 June 2026	Dasaki Stadium, Dasaki Achnas, Cyprus	Cyprus	1–0	2–0	2027 FIFA Women's World Cup qualification
