= Anna Dlasková =

Czech footballer

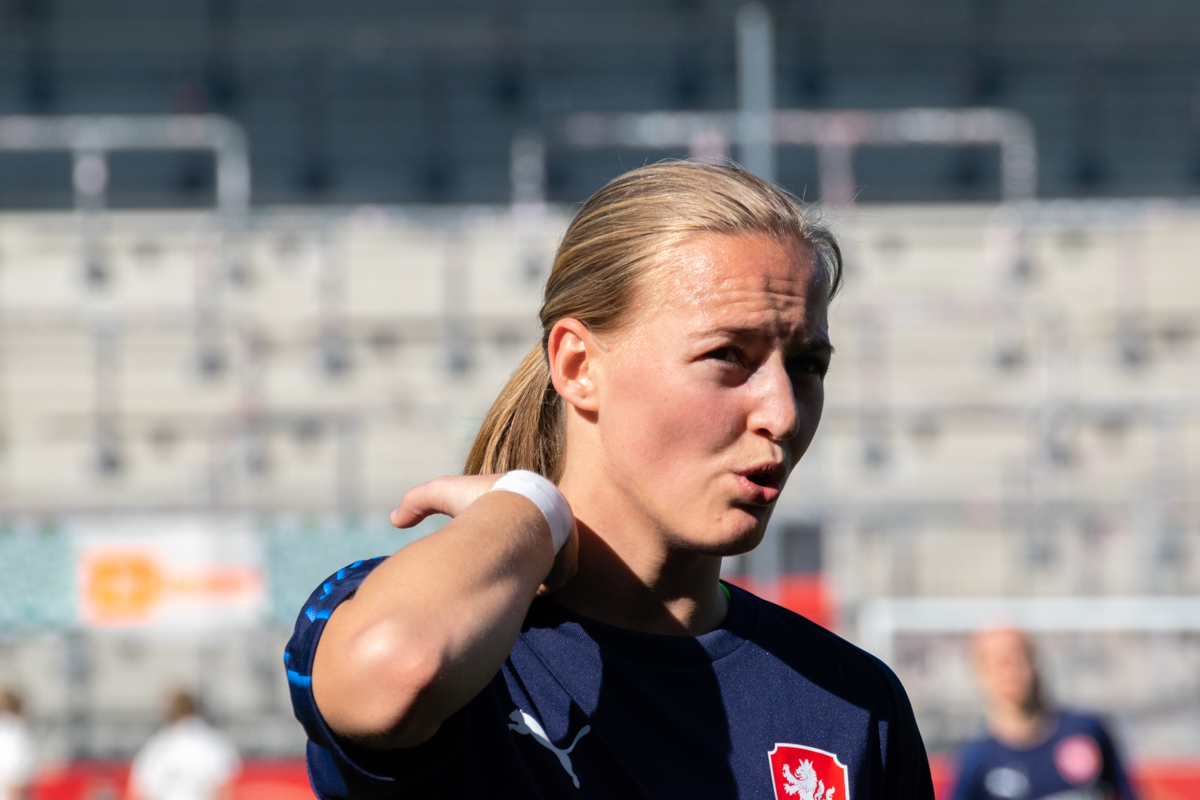
- Dlasková in 2018

Personal information
- Full name: Anna Dlasková
- Date of birth: 6 October 1995 (age 31)
- Place of birth: Mladá Boleslav, Czech Republic
- Height: 1.53 m (5 ft 0 in)
- Position: Defender

Youth career
- FK Dlouhá Lhota
- 2005–2013: Sparta Prague

Senior career*
Years	Team	Apps	(Gls)
2013–2024	Sparta Prague		
2024–2025	Slovan Liberec		

International career^{‡}
2013–2023	Czech Republic	34	(2)
- * Club domestic league appearances and goals ‡ National team caps and goals as of 3 June 2024

Anna Dlasková (born 6 October 1995) is a Czech former football defender, who last played for Slovan Liberec in the Czech Women's First League. She previously played for Sparta Prague from 2005 to 2024.

She was a member of the Czech national team. Dlasková made her debut for the national team in a match against Poland on 22 June 2013.

== International goals ==
Statistics accurate as of match played 15 Nov 2022.

No.	Date	Venue	Opponent	Score	Result	Competition
1.	7 October 2018	Kroměříž, Czech Republic	Slovakia	2–0	2–0	Friendly
2.	6 September 2022	Antonis Papadopoulos Stadium, Larnaca, Cyprus	Cyprus	7–0	7–0	2023 FIFA Women's World Cup qualification
