= Simona Petkova =

Bulgarian footballer (born 1993)

Simona Petkova Симона Петкова (Bulgarian)
Personal information
- Full name: Simona Rumyanova Petkova
- Date of birth: 3 September 1993 (age 33)
- Place of birth: Gabrovo
- Height: 1.63 m (5 ft 4 in)
- Position: Midfielder

Team information
- Current team: FC Aarau Frauen
- Number: 7

Senior career*
Years	Team	Apps	(Gls)
2017–2018	Watford	15	(3)
2018–2019	Pink Bari	16	(0)
2019	Empoli	1	(1)
2020	San Marino Academy	0	(0)
2020-2021	FC Lugano	18	(3)
2021–2023	YB Frauen	0	(0)
2023-	Aarau frauen	0	(0)

International career^{‡}
	Bulgaria U17	3	(0)
2010–2011	Bulgaria U19	4	(0)
2012–	Bulgaria	6	(0)
- * Club domestic league appearances and goals as of 30 November 2019 ‡ National team caps and goals as of 14 June 2019

Simona Rumyanova Petkova (Bulgarian: Симона Румянова Петкова; born 3 September 1993) is a Bulgarian footballer who plays as a midfielder for Swiss Women's Super League club FC Aarau Frauen and the Bulgaria women's national team.

== International career ==
Petkova was capped most recently for Bulgaria at senior level in a 0–6 friendly loss to Croatia on 14 June 2019.

== Honours ==
Bulgaria Women's Footballer of the Year - 2021, 2022

== International goals ==
No.	Date	Venue	Opponent	Score	Result	Competition
1.	5 April 2024	FC Kairat Academy, Almaty, Kazakhstan	Kazakhstan	1–0	1–0	UEFA Women's Euro 2025 qualifying
