= Korina Janež =

Slovenian footballer (born 2004)

Personal information
- Full name: Korina Lara Janež
- Date of birth: 25 February 2004 (age 22)
- Place of birth: Ljubljana, Slovenia
- Height: 1.62 m (5 ft 4 in)
- Position: Midfielder

Team information
- Current team: Union Berlin
- Number: 8

Youth career
- 2015–2021: ŽNK Krim

Senior career*
Years	Team	Apps	(Gls)
2020–2021	ŽNK Krim	8	(5)
2021–2022	ŽNK Radomlje	20	(15)
2022–2024	RB Leipzig	31	(5)
2024–	Union Berlin	29	(3)

International career^{‡}
2019–2020	Slovenia U17	6	(0)
2021–2023	Slovenia U19	18	(4)
2020–	Slovenia	27	(1)
- * Club domestic league appearances and goals as of 22 February 2026 ‡ National team caps and goals as of 17:08, 9 October 2026 (UTC)

Korina Lara Janež (born 25 February 2004) is a Slovenian professional footballer who plays as a midfielder for Frauen-Bundesliga club Union Berlin and the Slovenia national team. She previously played for RB Leipzig

== Career statistics ==
=== International ===
As of match played 27 October 2025

Appearances and goals by national team and year
National team	Year	Apps	Goals
Slovenia
Slovenia	2020	1	0
Slovenia	2021	0	0
Slovenia	2022	1	0
Slovenia	2023	5	0
Slovenia	2024	11	1
Slovenia	2025	9	0
Total		27	1

Scores and results list Slovenia's goal tally first, score column indicates score after each Janež goal.

List of international goals scored by Korina Janež
No.	Date	Venue	Opponent	Score	Result	Competition
1	4 June 2024	Sloka Stadium, Jūrmala, Latvia	Latvia	3–0	4–0	UEFA Women's Euro 2025 qualifying

== Honours ==
RB Leipzig

- 2. Frauen-Bundesliga: 2022–23

Union Berlin

- 2. Frauen-Bundesliga: 2024–25
