= Agata Guściora =

Polish footballer (born 1994)

Personal information
- Date of birth: 6 October 1994 (age 32)
- Place of birth: Poland
- Position: Defender

Youth career
- LKS Wierzchowiska
- 2008–2010: UKS Widok
- 2010: Górnik Łęczna

Senior career*
Years	Team	Apps	(Gls)
2010–2011	UKS Widok		
2011–2016	Górnik Łęczna		
2016–2017	Medyk Konin		
2017–2022	Górnik Łęczna	52	(10)

International career
2014–2019	Poland	45	(3)
- * Club domestic league appearances and goals

Agata Guściora (born 6 October 1994) is a Polish former professional footballer who played as a defender. A former Poland international, she made 45 appearances and scored thrice for the national team.

== Career ==
Guściora has been capped for the Poland national team, appearing for the team during the 2019 FIFA Women's World Cup qualifying cycle.

== Career statistics ==
=== International ===
Appearances and goals by national team and year
National team	Year	Apps	Goals
Poland	2014	8	0
Poland	2015	6	0
Poland	2016	13	0
Poland	2017	11	2
Poland	2018	6	1
Poland	2019	1	0
Total		45	3

Scores and results list Poland's goal tally first, score column indicates score after each Guściora goal.

List of international goals scored by Agata Guściora
No.	Date	Venue	Opponent	Score	Result	Competition
1	11 April 2017	Minsk, Belarus	Belarus	1–0	4–0	Friendly
2	24 November 2017	Loro Boriçi Stadium, Shkodër, Albania	Albania	2–0	4–1	2019 FIFA World Cup qualification
3	28 February 2018	Alanya, Turkey	Jordan	1–0	2–0	2018 Turkish Women's Cup

== Honours ==
Medyk Konin

- Ekstraliga: 2016–17
- Polish Cup: 2016–17

Górnik Łęczna

- Ekstraliga: 2017–18, 2018–19, 2019–20
- Polish Cup: 2017–18, 2019–20
