= Karina Olkhovik =

Belarusian footballer (born 2000)

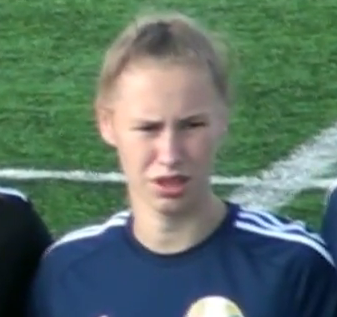

Personal information
- Date of birth: 17 June 2000 (age 26)
- Place of birth: Dzyatlava, Belarus
- Height: 1.67 m (5 ft 6 in)
- Position: Forward

Team information
- Current team: Ankara BB Fomget
- Number: 42

Senior career*
Years	Team	Apps	(Gls)
2016–2019	Isloch-RGUOR	69	(86)
2020–2021	Dynamo-BSUPC	45	(51)
2022	Chievo Verona	5	(3)
2022–2023	Sassuolo	1	(0)
2023	→ Cesena (loan)	?	(4)
2023–2024	ALG Spor	29	(16)
2024–2026	Fenerbahçe	28	(7)
2026–	Ankara BB Fomget	2	(4)

International career^{‡}
2019–	Belarus	20	(4)
- * Club domestic league appearances and goals as of 05:38, 15 September 2026 (UTC) ‡ National team caps and goals as of 6 September 2022

Karina Olkhovik (Belarusian: Карына Альховік, Russian: Карина Ольховик, born 17 June 2000) is a Belarusian professional footballer who plays as a forward for Ankara BB Fomget and the Belarus national team.

== Club career ==
Olhovik began her football career with Lida, before joining Isloch-RGUOR in 2012. On April 17, 2016, she made her senior debut for the latter club in a 7–1 league win over Slavyanka: in the same instance, she also scored her first senior goal. In the following years, she repeatedly became the Premier League's top scorer: she achieved her highest tally at the end of the 2018 season, having scored 42 goals, and was eventually named the Best Belarusian Woman Footballer of the Year for her performances.

In January 2020, she left Isloch-RGUOR, and subsequently joined newly created side Dynamo-BSUPC. On April 30, in her debut for the club against ABFF, she scored a brace. In the debut season, she won both the league title and Belarusian Women's Cup with Dynamo. The club achieved the same feat in the 2021 season, while also winning the Belarusian Super Cup. In January 2022, the forward left the Minsk-based club.

On 21 January 2022, Olhovik joined Serie B side Chievo Verona. She scored three goals for the club, as the club finished fourth in the league table.

On 30 July of the same year, Olhovik joined Serie A side Sassuolo on a permanent deal. She made her debut for the club on September 12, 2022, coming on for Refiloe Jane in the 67th minute of a 2–1 league loss to Parma. In November 2022, the forward received her second award as the Best Belarusian Woman Footballer of the Year.

On 5 January 2023, Olhovik joined Serie B club Cesena on loan until the end of the season. She scored four league for the team, which finished seventh in the league table.

On 23 August 2023, Olhovik joined Turkish club ALG Spor on a permanent deal.

On 6 September 2024, she transferred to Fenerbahçe in Istanbul.

== International career ==
Olhovik represented Belarus at youth international level, having played for the under-17 and under-19 national teams.

In 2017, she received her first call-up to the Belarusian senior national team, and won her first cap on 15 September of the same year, coming on for Ekaterina Lutskevich in the 62nd minute of a 4–1 defeat to Poland, a match from the 2019 FIFA World Cup qualification. On 7 June 2018, she scored her first goal for Belarus in a 2–1 loss to Scotland, also in the World Cup qualifiers.

== Career statistics ==
=== International ===
No.	Date	Venue	Opponent	Score	Result	Competition
1.	7 June 2018	Falkirk Stadium, Falkirk, Scotland	Scotland	1–0	1–2	2019 FIFA Women's World Cup qualification
2.	3 September 2019	Borisov Arena, Barysaw, Belarus	Faroe Islands	1–0	6–0	UEFA Women's Euro 2022 qualifying
3.	3 September 2019	Borisov Arena, Barysaw, Belarus	Faroe Islands	4–0	6–0	UEFA Women's Euro 2022 qualifying
4.	22 September 2020	Tórsvøllur, Tórshavn, Faroe Islands	Faroe Islands	2–0	2–0	UEFA Women's Euro 2022 qualifying
5.	11 April 2021	AGMK Stadium, Olmaliq, Uzbekistan	Uzbekistan	1–1	3–1	Friendly
6.	8 June 2021	Spartak Stadium, Mogilev, Belarus	Iran	1–0	6–0	Friendly
7.	8 June 2021	Spartak Stadium, Mogilev, Belarus	Iran	4–0	6–0	Friendly
8.	14 June 2021	Vitebsky Central Sport Complex, Vitebsk, Belarus	Uzbekistan	1–0	1–1	Friendly
9.	15 November 2022	Ararat Stadium, Tehran, Iran	Iran	1–1	1–1	Friendly
10.	12 July 2024	Mikheil Meskhi Stadium, Tbilisi, Georgia	Georgia	1–0	2–0	UEFA Women's Euro 2025 qualifying
11.	16 July 2024	Mikheil Meskhi Stadium, Tbilisi, Georgia	Cyprus	3–0	5–0	UEFA Women's Euro 2025 qualifying
12.	3 December 2024	UFA Football Pitch, Tashkent, Uzbekistan	Uzbekistan	3–0	3–0	Friendly
13.	28 October 2025	National Stadium, Ta'Qali, Malta	Malta	1–0	1–0	Friendly
14.	13 October 2026	Stadio Artemio Franchi, Florence, Italy	Italy	1–1	1–1	2027 FIFA Women's World Cup qualification play-offs
