= Zoe Ness =

Scottish footballer (born 1996)

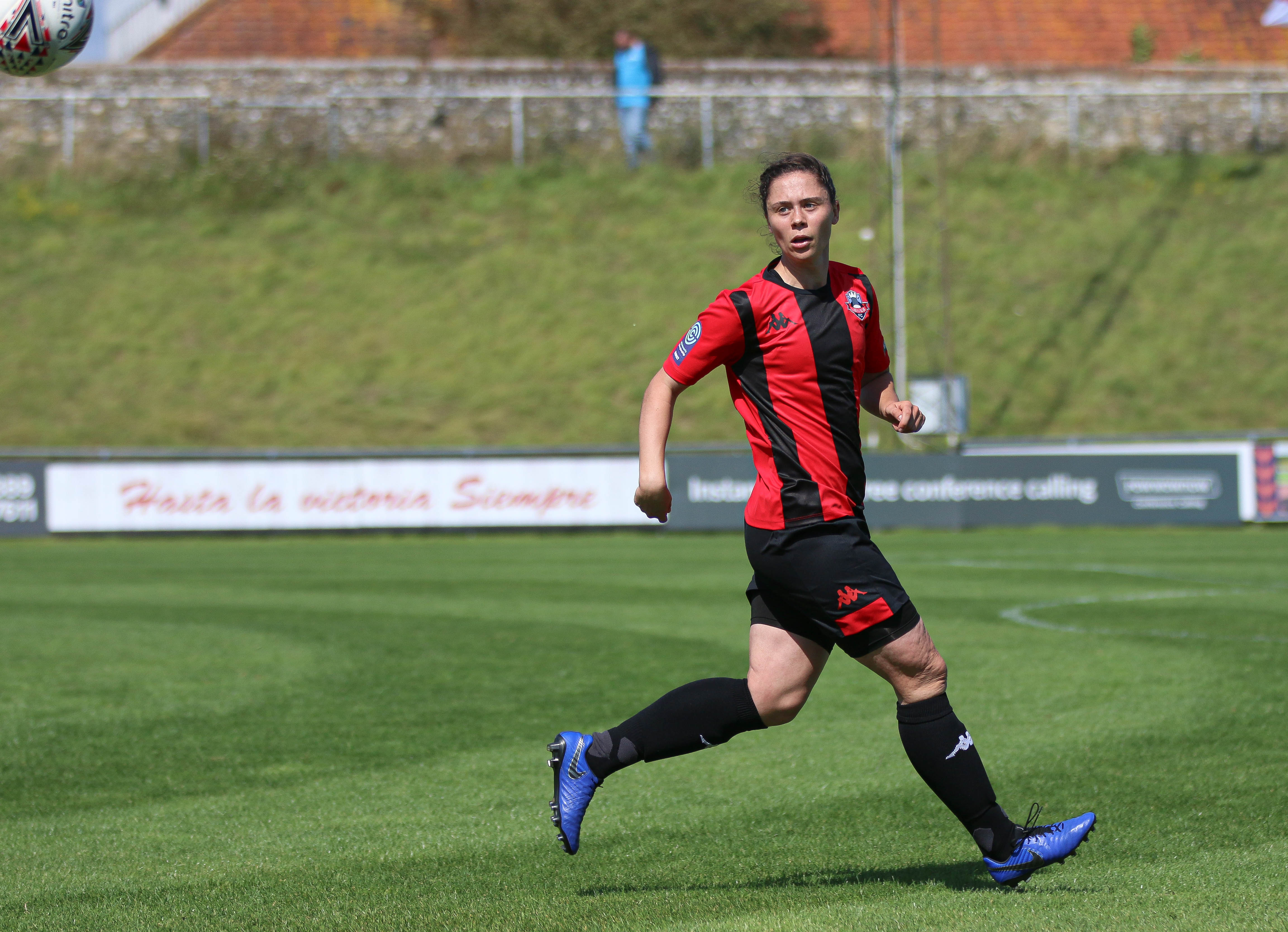
- Zoe Ness playing for Lewes on 18 August 2018

Personal information
- Full name: Zoe Ness
- Date of birth: 24 March 1996 (age 30)
- Place of birth: Durham, England
- Position: Forward

Senior career*
Years	Team	Apps	(Gls)
2014	Durham	16	(2)
2015–2016	Mallbackens IF	42	(8)
2017–2019	Durham	35	(14)
2019–2020	Lewes	7	(2)
2020–2022	Rangers	?	(12)

International career^{‡}
2009–2010	Scotland U15	4	(0)
2011–2012	Scotland U17	12	(11)
2012–2015	Scotland U19	25	(19)
2018–2021	Scotland	11	(1)
- * Club domestic league appearances and goals as of 31 January 2020 ‡ National team caps and goals as of 11 June 2021

Zoe Ness (born 24 March 1996) is a Scottish footballer, who played as a forward for Rangers in the Scottish Women's Premier League.

== Club career ==
Ness was born in Durham just after her parents had moved there for work. She came through the youth ranks at Durham Cestria before signing a senior deal with Durham in 2014 as the team entered the FA WSL 2 for the first time.

Ness made 20 appearances across all competitions in Durham's debut season before securing a move to Sweden with Damallsvenskan team Mallbackens IF. She scored three goals in the team's final five league games to help them avoid relegation.

After two seasons in Sweden, Ness made a return to Durham ahead of the FA WSL Spring Series in 2017. In July 2019, Ness announced she was ending her second spell at Durham.

In August 2019, Ness subsequently signed for fellow Championship side Lewes.

Ness signed for Rangers in February 2020.

== International ==
Despite being born in England, Ness is eligible to represent Scotland because both her parents are Scottish. She has played at under-15, under-17 and under-19 level as well as for the senior team.

In 2014, Ness traveled to Norway to compete in the 2014 UEFA Women's Under-19 Championship with Scotland, scoring in a Group Stage win over Belgium.

Ness was first called up to the senior team for a friendly against Sweden in January 2016 but didn't make her debut for a further two years during a friendly against New Zealand at La Manga on 3 March 2018, before playing a second friendly against the same opposition three days later. Ness scored her first senior international goal on 10 April 2018 in a 2019 FIFA Women's World Cup qualifier against Poland.

== Career statistics ==
=== International appearances ===
Scotland statistics accurate as of match played 11 April 2023.

Year	Scotland	
Year	Apps	Goals
2018	3	1
2019	6	0
2020	1	0
2021	2	0
Total	12	1

=== International goals ===
As of match played 5 April 2019. Scotland score listed first, score column indicates score after each Ness goal.

International goals by date, venue, opponent, score, result and competition
No.	Date	Venue	Opponent	Score	Result	Competition
1	10 April 2018	St Mirren Park, Paisley, Scotland	Poland	1–0	3–0	2019 FIFA Women's World Cup qualification
