= Valeriya Belaya =

Belarusian footballer

Personal information
- Full name: Valeriya Belaya
- Date of birth: 4 July 1998 (age 28)
- Place of birth: Minsk, Belarus,
- Position: Midfielder

Team information
- Current team: Zvezda Perm

Senior career*
Years	Team	Apps	(Gls)
2014-2020	FC Minsk	92	(31)
2021-	Zvezda Perm	46	(5)

International career^{‡}
2013-2015	Belarus U17	12	(0)
2015-2016	Belarus U19	8	(0)
2017-	Belarus	2	(0)
- * Club domestic league appearances and goals as of 00:00, 15 October 2022 (UTC) ‡ National team caps and goals as of 15:35, 11 May 2020 (UTC)

Valeriya Belaya (born 4 July 1998) is a Belarusian footballer who plays as a midfielder for Zvezda Perm in the Russian Women's Football Championship and has appeared for the Belarus women's national team.

== Career ==
Belaya has been capped for the Belarus national team, appearing for the team during the 2019 FIFA Women's World Cup qualifying cycle.

== International goals ==
No.	Date	Venue	Opponent	Score	Result	Competition
1.	10 October 2022	Borisov Arena, Barysaw, Belarus	Russia	1–0	2–2	Friendly
2.	14 July 2023	Borisov Arena, Barysaw, Belarus	Uzbekistan	1–1	4–1	Friendly
3.	16 July 2024	Mikheil Meskhi Stadium, Tbilisi, Georgia	Cyprus	4–0	5–0	UEFA Women's Euro 2025 qualifying
4.	3 December 2024	UFA Football Pitch, Tashkent, Uzbekistan	Uzbekistan	1–0	3–0	Friendly
