= Viktorija Panchurova =

Macedonian footballer

Personal information
- Date of birth: 25 December 1999 (age 26)
- Position: Goalkeeper

Team information
- Current team: Tiverija

Senior career*
Years	Team	Apps	(Gls)
- Vllaznia
- Tiverija

International career^{‡}
2014	Macedonia U17	2	(0)
2015–2016	Macedonia U19	5	(0)
2016–	North Macedonia	10	(0)
- * Club domestic league appearances and goals ‡ National team caps and goals as of 6 March 2020

Viktorija Panchurova (Macedonian: Викторија Панчурова; born 25 December 1999) is a Macedonian footballer who plays as a goalkeeper for 1. liga club ŽFK Tiverija Istatov and the North Macedonia women's national team.
