= Geldona Morina =

Kosovan–Albanian footballer

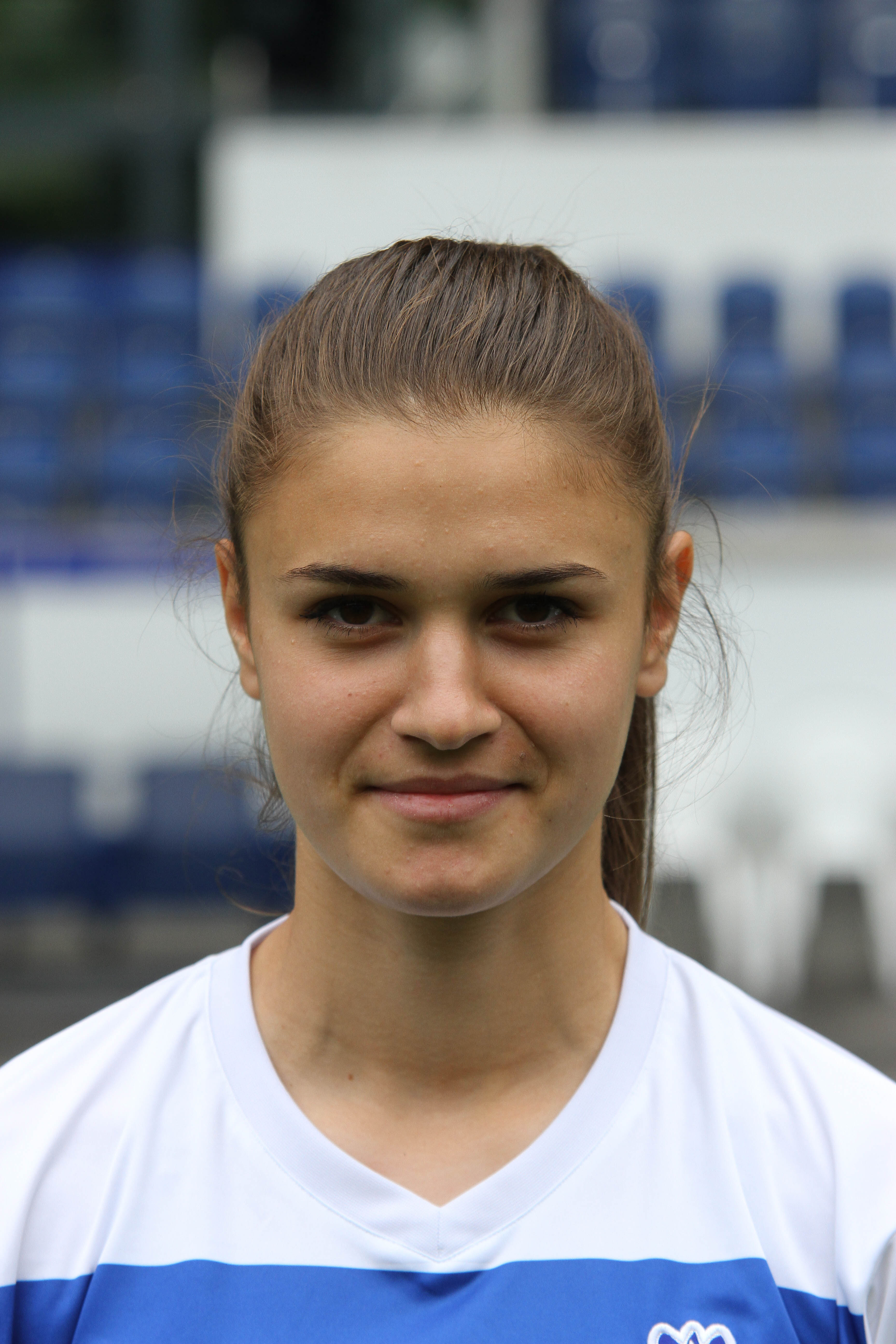
- Morina in 2014

Personal information
- Date of birth: 8 November 1993 (age 33)
- Place of birth: Klina, FR Yugoslavia (now Kosovo)
- Height: 1.67 m (5 ft 5 1/2 in)
- Position: Midfielder

Senior career*
| Years | Team | Apps | (Gls) |
| 2010–2012 | FCR 2001 Duisburg II | 34 | (3) |
| 2012 | FCR 2001 Duisburg | 1 | (0) |
| 2012–2014 | SGS Essen | 8 | (0) |
| 2012–2014 | SGS Essen II | 7 | (2) |
| 2014–2015 | MSV Duisburg | 12 | (2) |
| 2015–2017 | FSV Gütersloh 2009 | 36 | (1) |
| 2017–2021 | MSV Duisburg | 74 | (4) |

International career^{‡}
| 2013–2020 | Albania | | |
- * Club domestic league appearances and goals as of 1 March 2020 ‡ National team caps and goals as of 30 August 2019

Geldona Morina (born 8 November 1993) is a Kosovan-born Albanian footballer who plays as a midfielder and has appeared for the Albania women's national team.

== Career ==
Morina appeared for the national team during the 2019 FIFA Women's World Cup qualifying cycle.

== See also ==
- List of Albania women's international footballers
