= Ana Maria Stanciu =

Romanian footballer (born 1987)

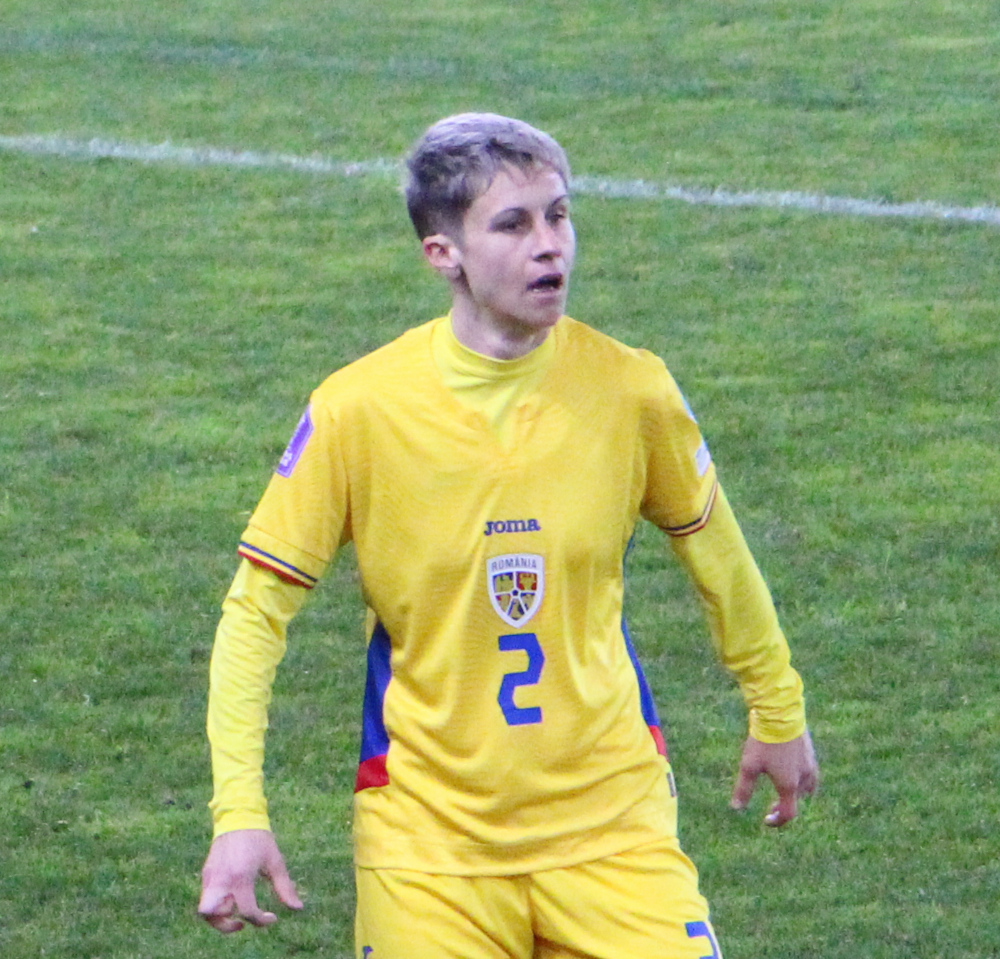

Personal information
- Date of birth: 6 July 1987 (age 39)
- Position: Defender

Senior career*
Years	Team	Apps	(Gls)
- Apollon Limassol

International career^{‡}
	Romania U19	9	(1)
2004–2013	Romania	3	(0)
- * Club domestic league appearances and goals ‡ National team caps and goals as of 23 November 2013

Ana Maria Stanciu (born 6 July 1987) is a Romanian footballer who plays as a defender. She has been a member of the Romania women's national team.
