= FC Dnepr Mogilev (women) =

ZhFC Dnepr Mogilev
- Full name: Жаночы Футбольны Клуб Днепр-Магілёў
- Short name: Dnepr Mogilev
- Founded: 2020
- Ground: Stadion SDYuShOR-7, Mogilev, Belarus
- Capacity: 1,000
- Coordinates: 53.9194258°N 30.3164104°E
- Head coach: Dmitriy Radkov
- Coach: Mikhail Sobolev
- League: Belarusian Women's Premier League
- 2022: 4th
- Website: https://fc-dnepr.by/
Home colours	Away colours

Dnepr Mogilev (Belarusian: ЖФК Днепр-Магілёў, romanized: ZFK Dniapro Mahilyow; Russian: ЖФК Днепр Могилёв) is a Belarusian football team from Mogilev, Belarus. They are the women's team of FC Dnepr Mogilev, and playing in the Belarusian Women's Premier League. Their home stadium is the Stadion SDYuShor-7.

== Current squad ==
As of 15 May 2022.

Note: Flags indicate national team as defined under FIFA eligibility rules; some limited exceptions apply. Players may hold more than one non-FIFA nationality.

No.	Pos.	Nation	Player
—	GK	(Belarus) BLR	Svetlana Kolomeytseva-Korbut
—	MF	(Belarus) BLR	Irina Tretjakova
—	DF	(Belarus) BLR	Kristina Osmolovskaya
—	DF	(Belarus) BLR	Valeria Bondareva
—	MF	(Belarus) BLR	Kira Strikunova
—	MF	(Belarus) BLR	Ganna Denisenko
—	DF	(Belarus) BLR	Alina Koneva
—	MF	(Belarus) BLR	Viktoria Barlyugova
—	DF	(Belarus) BLR	Veronika Minchenko
—	MF	(Belarus) BLR	Yulia Denisenko
—	MF	(Belarus) BLR	Valentina Nizhegorodova
—	MF	(Belarus) BLR	Marina Pushkar
—	GK	(Belarus) BLR	Anna Zaletova

No.	Pos.	Nation	Player
—	DF	(Belarus) BLR	Valeria Kruchinina
—	MF	(Belarus) BLR	Nadezhda Savchenko
—	MF	(Belarus) BLR	Margarita Lazarenko
—	FW	(Belarus) BLR	Valeria Barborenko
—	FW	(Belarus) BLR	Valentina Kapunkina
—	MF	(Belarus) BLR	Karolina Zhitko
