= Dasaki Achnas =

Village on Cyprus

Dasaki Achna: Δασάκι Άχνας (Greek)
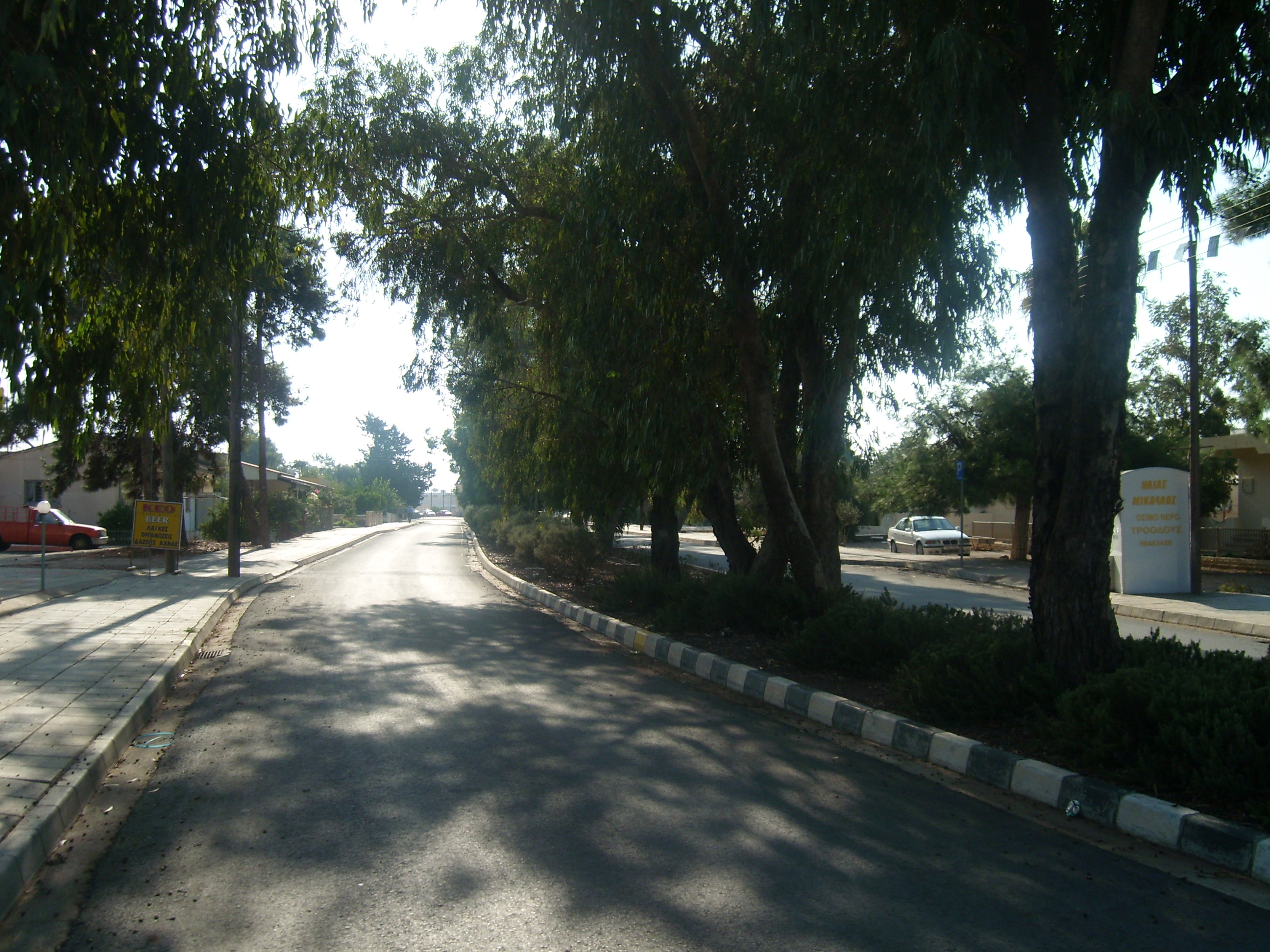
- Main Street in Dasaki Achnas

- Location in Cyprus
- Coordinates: 35°1′53″N 33°46′10.4″E
- Country: Akrotiri and Dhekelia

Population (2011)
  - Total: 2,087
- Time zone: UTC+2 (EET)
  - Summer (DST): UTC+3 (EEST)

Dasaki Achnas (Greek: Δασάκι Άχνας) is a village located within the British Overseas Territory of Akrotiri and Dhekelia on the island of Cyprus. As of 2011, the population of the village was 2,087. The village is home to the Ethnikos Achna FC football team, who play out of their home ground of Dasaki Stadium.

== History ==
The village was founded after the Greek residents of Achna after they fled the Turkish invasion of Cyprus in 1974.
