= Belarus women's national football team =

Women's national association football team representing Belarus

Belarus
- Association: Football Federation of Belarus (Беларуская фэдэрацыя па футболу)
- Confederation: UEFA (Europe)
- Head coach: Vladimir Shindikov
- Captain: Oksana Shpak
- Most caps: Anna Pilipenko (51)
- Top scorer: Anna Pilipenko (16)
- FIFA code: BLR
First colours	Second colours

FIFA ranking
- Current: 46 ▲6 (20 October 2026)
- Highest: 37 (December 2011; August 2012)
- Lowest: 57 (March 2023 – March 2024)

First international
- Unofficial : Belarus 0–0 Latvia (Minsk, Belarus; 14 August 1992); Official : Poland 3–0 Belarus (Kędzierzyn-Koźle, Poland; 4 November 1995)

Biggest win
- Estonia 0–7 Belarus (Valga, Estonia; 17 May 2000); Belarus 8–1 Kazakhstan (Minsk, Belarus; 25 August 2004)

Biggest defeat
- Ukraine 8–0 Belarus (Kyiv, Ukraine; 2 August 2014); Netherlands 8–0 Belarus (18 September 2015)

The Belarus women's national football team represents Belarus in international women's football. The team is governed by the Football Federation of Belarus (Беларуская фэдэрацыя па футболу).

After the 2022 Russian invasion of Ukraine, FIFA and UEFA, the European governing body for football, banned Belarusian national and club teams from hosting international competitions.

== History ==
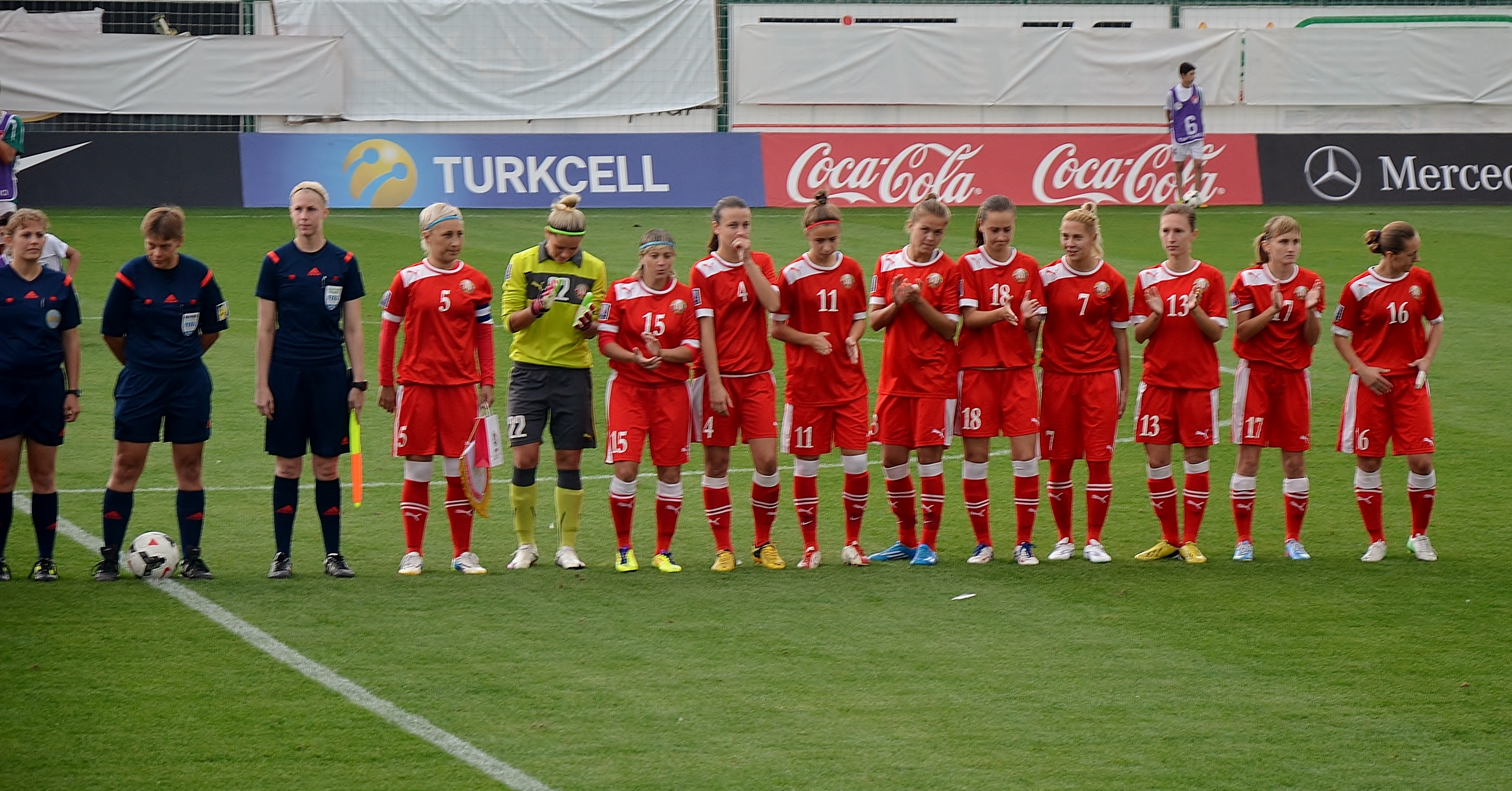
Belarus women's national team in the 2015 FIFA Women's World Cup qualification – UEFA Group 6 match against Turkey on September 17, 2014.

Belarus first appeared in a FIFA/UEFA qualification stage in the 1997 European Championship, where it was paired with the Czech Republic, Poland and Estonia. In its first official match they lost 0–1 to the Czech Republic on 7 October 1995. In May 1996 they attained their first official win by beating 3–0 Poland, which had defeated them 2–0 in the first match. In the 1999 World Cup qualifying Belarus was ranked in Class B, with no qualifying options.

In the 2001 European Championship qualifying, again in Class B, Belarus beat Estonia 4–1 and 0–7, Israel 0–5 and 1–0 and Slovakia 1–0, and tied 1–1 in Romania, but the Romanians earned the spot in the promotion play-offs after beating Belarus 0–1. Belarus lost 6–1 to Slovakia in the last match.

In the 2003 World Cup qualifying, Class B, Belarus was 3rd, tied with Slovakia.

In the 2005 European Championship qualification, Class B, Belarus beat Estonia 5–0 and 1–3, Kazakhstan 0–2 and 8–1, and Israel 0–2. They just conceded two points, from a home 1–1 tie against Israel. Belarus topped the group for the first time, but there were no promotion play-offs as the qualifying system was unified for 2009.

In the 2007 FIFA Women's World Cup qualification Belarus was promoted for the First Category, and ended second to last with 7 points. In the 2009 European Championship qualifying Belarus ended second to last. In the 2011 World Cup qualifying Belarus was 3rd. In the 2013 European Championship qualifying Belarus was grouped with Finland, Ukraine, Slovakia and Estonia.

== Results and fixtures ==
The following is a list of match results in the last 12 months, as well as any future matches that have been scheduled.

Legend

Win Draw Lose Fixture

=== 2025 ===
26 November Friendly	Bosnia and Herzegovina	1–2	Belarus	Zenica, Bosnia and Herzegovina
18:00	Nikolic 82'		Valyuk 17'; Shlapakova 58'	Stadium: FF BiH Training Center

29 November Friendly	Belarus	0–2	Greece	Zenica, Bosnia and Herzegovina
16:00 EET		Report	Pouliou 66'; Brookshire 70'	Stadium: Bosnia and Herzegovina FA Training Centre; Referee: Aida Jusufović (Bosnia and Herzegovina)

=== 2026 ===
9 October 2027 FIFA Women's World Cup play-offs	Belarus	0–2	Italy	David Petriashvili Stadium, Tbilisi, Georgia (Note: Due to Belarusian involvement in the Russian invasion of Ukraine, Belarus are required to play their home matches at neutral venues, and behind closed doors, until further notice.)
18:15 (20:15 UTC+4)		Report (FIFA); Report (UEFA)	Piemonte 66'; Polli 90+1'	Attendance: 0 (Note: behind closed doors); Referee: Maika Vanderstichel (France)

13 October 2027 FIFA Women's World Cup play-offs	Italy	1–1	Belarus	Florence
18:15	Bonansea 9'	Report (FIFA); Report (UEFA)	Olkhovik 75'	Stadium: Stadio Artemio Franchi; Referee: Abigail Byrne (England)

- Results and Fixtures – Soccerway.com

== Coaching staff ==
=== Current coaching staff ===
Name	Role
(Belarus) Vladimir Shindikov	Head coach

=== Manager history ===
Name	Period	Matches	Wins	Draws	Losses	Winning %	Notes
(Belarus) Yuri Maleev	–	0	0	0	0	00.0%	
(Belarus) Eduard Demenkovets	????–	0	0	0	0	00.0%	
(Belarus) Vladimir Shindikov	????–	0	0	0	0	00.0%	

== Players ==
=== Current squad ===
The following players were named to the squad for the friendly matches against the Bosnia and Herzegovina on 26 November 2025 and Greece on 29 November 2025.

Caps and goals are correct as of 3 June 2025, after the game against Hungary.

No.	Pos.	Player	Date of birth (age)	Caps	Goals	Club
	GK	Ekaterina Miklashevich	25 January 1992 (age 34)	5	0	(Football Federation of Belarus) FC Minsk
	GK	Natalya Voskobovich	17 June 1995 (age 31)			(Russian Football Union) Zenit Saint Petersburg
	GK	Maria Svidunovich	11 January 2003 (age 23)			(Russian Football Union) Ryazan-VDV
	DF	Darya Gorshkova	28 November 1998 (age 27)			(Football Federation of Belarus) Dinamo-BGUFK
	DF	Zarina Kapustina	15 November 1998 (age 28)	11	0	(Football Federation of Belarus) Dinamo-BGUFK
	DF	Olga Kapysha	25 March 2003 (age 23)	6	0	(Football Federation of Belarus) Dinamo-BGUFK
	DF	Arina Sitnikava	6 November 2001 (age 25)	11	0	(Georgian Football Federation) Lusso
	DF	Yulia Slesarchik	25 August 1994 (age 32)	58	4	(Georgian Football Federation) Lusso
	DF	Kseniya Kubichnaya	6 March 1999 (age 27)			(Football Federation of Belarus) FC Minsk
	DF	Anna Kozyupa	7 March 1995 (age 31)	58	2	(Russian Football Union) Lokomotiv Moscow
	MF	Anastasiya Shlapakova	6 March 2000 (age 26)	41	9	(Russian Football Union) Dynamo Moscow
	MF	Valeriya Belaya	4 July 1998 (age 28)	22	3	(Football Federation of Belarus) FC Minsk
	MF	Anastasiya Linnik (Captain)	11 July 1993 (age 33)	51	6	(Russian Football Union) Lokomotiv Moscow
	MF	Karina Olkhovik	17 June 2000 (age 26)	48	11	(Turkish Football Federation) Fenerbahçe
	MF	Melana Surovtseva	13 January 2003 (age 23)	29	0	(Hungarian Football Federation) Puskás Akadémia
	MF	Alina Cherlenok	21 September 1999 (age 27)			(Football Federation of Belarus) Dinamo-BGUFK
	MF	Anastasiya Mager	31 January 2006 (age 20)	6	0	(Russian Football Union) Zvezda-2005 Perm
	MF	Elizaveta Pinchuk	12 December 2004 (age 21)			(Football Federation of Belarus) Dnepr-Mogilev
	FW	Viktoriya Valyuk	30 June 2002 (age 24)	25	4	(Football Federation of Belarus) FC Minsk
	FW	Anastasiya Shuppo	15 November 1997 (age 29)	49	7	(Football Federation of Belarus) FC Minsk
	FW	Anna Sinyavskaya	15 January 2006 (age 20)	0	0	(Football Federation of Belarus) Dinamo-BGUFK
	FW	Karolina Zhitko	22 November 1999 (age 26)	3	1	(Russian Football Union) Rubin Kazan
	FW	Nadezhda Voskobovich	14 February 1999 (age 27)			(Russian Football Union) Krylya Sovetov Samara

Pos.	Player	Date of birth (age)	Caps	Goals	Club	Latest call-up
GK	Darya Vinograd	15 April 1999 (age 27)	0	0	(Belarus) Dynamo Brest	v. Malta, 28 October 2025
DF	Viktoriya Kazakevich	12 May 1998 (age 28)	40	0	(Belarus) FC Minsk	v. Malta, 28 October 2025
MF	Anastasiya Kavaliova	15 January 2007 (age 19)	5	0	(Belarus) Dinamo-BSUPC	v. Malta, 28 October 2025
MF	Anna Sas	6 October 2003 (age 23)	31	0	(Russia) Dynamo Moscow	v. Malta, 28 October 2025
MF	Darya Pratasiuk	10 April 2007 (age 19)	0	0	(Belarus) FC Minsk	v. Malta, 28 October 2025
MF	Liya Tikhomirova	28 November 2000 (age 25)			(Belarus) Dinamo-BGUFK	v. Malta, 28 October 2025
FW	Anna Siniauskaya	15 January 2006 (age 20)	0	0	(Belarus) Dinamo-BGUFK	v. Malta, 28 October 2025

== Competitive record ==
=== FIFA Women's World Cup ===
FIFA Women's World Cup record									Qualification record						
Year	Result	Pld	W	D*	L	GF	GA	GD	Pld	W	D*	L	GF	GA	GD
(China); 1991	Did not exist								UEFA Euro 1991						
(Sweden); 1995	Did not enter								UEFA Euro 1995						
(United States); 1999	Did not qualify								6	1	2	3	8	9	−1
(United States); 2003	Did not qualify								8	5	0	3	27	16	+11
(China); 2007	Did not qualify								8	2	1	5	6	23	−17
(Germany); 2011	Did not qualify								8	4	1	3	17	14	+3
(Canada); 2015	Did not qualify								10	2	0	8	12	31	−19
(France); 2019	Did not qualify								8	1	0	7	5	21	−16
(Australia) (New Zealand); 2023	Did not qualify								8	2	1	5	7	26	−19
(Brazil); 2027	Did not qualify								6	3	1	2	11	4	+7
(Costa Rica) (Jamaica) (Mexico) (United States); 2031	To be determined								To be determined						
(United Kingdom); 2035	To be determined								To be determined						
Total	-	-	-	-	-	-	-	-	56	17	5	34	82	140	-68

*Draws include knockout matches decided on penalty kicks.

=== UEFA Women's Championship ===
UEFA Women's Championship record								Qualifying record							
Year	Result	Pld	W	D*	L	GF	GA	Pld	W	D*	L	GF	GA	P/R	Rnk
(Europe); 1984 to (Denmark); 1991	Did not exist							Did not exist							
(Italy); 1993	Did not enter							Did not enter							
(Germany); 1995	Did not enter							Did not enter							
(Norway) (Sweden); 1997	Did not qualify							6	3	0	3	12	9	–	
(Germany); 2001	Did not qualify							8	5	1	2	20	9	–	
(England); 2005	Did not qualify							8	5	1	2	21	3	–	
(Finland); 2009	Did not qualify							8	1	1	6	10	27	–	
(Sweden); 2013	Did not qualify							8	4	1	3	10	17	–	
(Netherlands); 2017	Did not qualify							8	3	0	5	10	20	–	
(England); 2022	Did not qualify							7	2	0	5	11	15	–	
(Switzerland); 2025	Did not qualify							8	6	1	1	20	8	▲ (Note: From Euro 2025 onwards a new qualifying format was introduced, linked to the Women's Nations League where teams are divided into leagues with promotion/relegation between the leagues at the end of each cycle.)	35th
(Germany); 2029	To be determined							To be determined							
Total	-	-	-	-	-	-	-	61	29	5	27	114	108	35th	

*Draws include knockout matches decided on penalty kicks.

=== UEFA Women's Nations League ===
UEFA Women's Nations League record
Year	League	Group	Pos	Pld	W	D	L	GF	GA	P/R	Rnk
2023–24	B	4	4th	6	0	2	4	3	7	▼	30th
2025	B	3	4th	6	0	3	3	0	8	▼	30th
Total				12	0	5	7	3	15	30th	

▲	Promoted at end of season
Same position	No movement at end of season
▼	Relegated at end of season
*	Participated in promotion/relegation play-offs

== See also ==
- Sport in Belarus
  - Football in Belarus
- Belarus men's national football team
