= Dasaki Stadium =

Stadium in Dasaki Achnas, Cyprus

Coordinates: 35°2′2″N 33°45′54″E

Ethnikos Achnas Stadium
- Dasaki
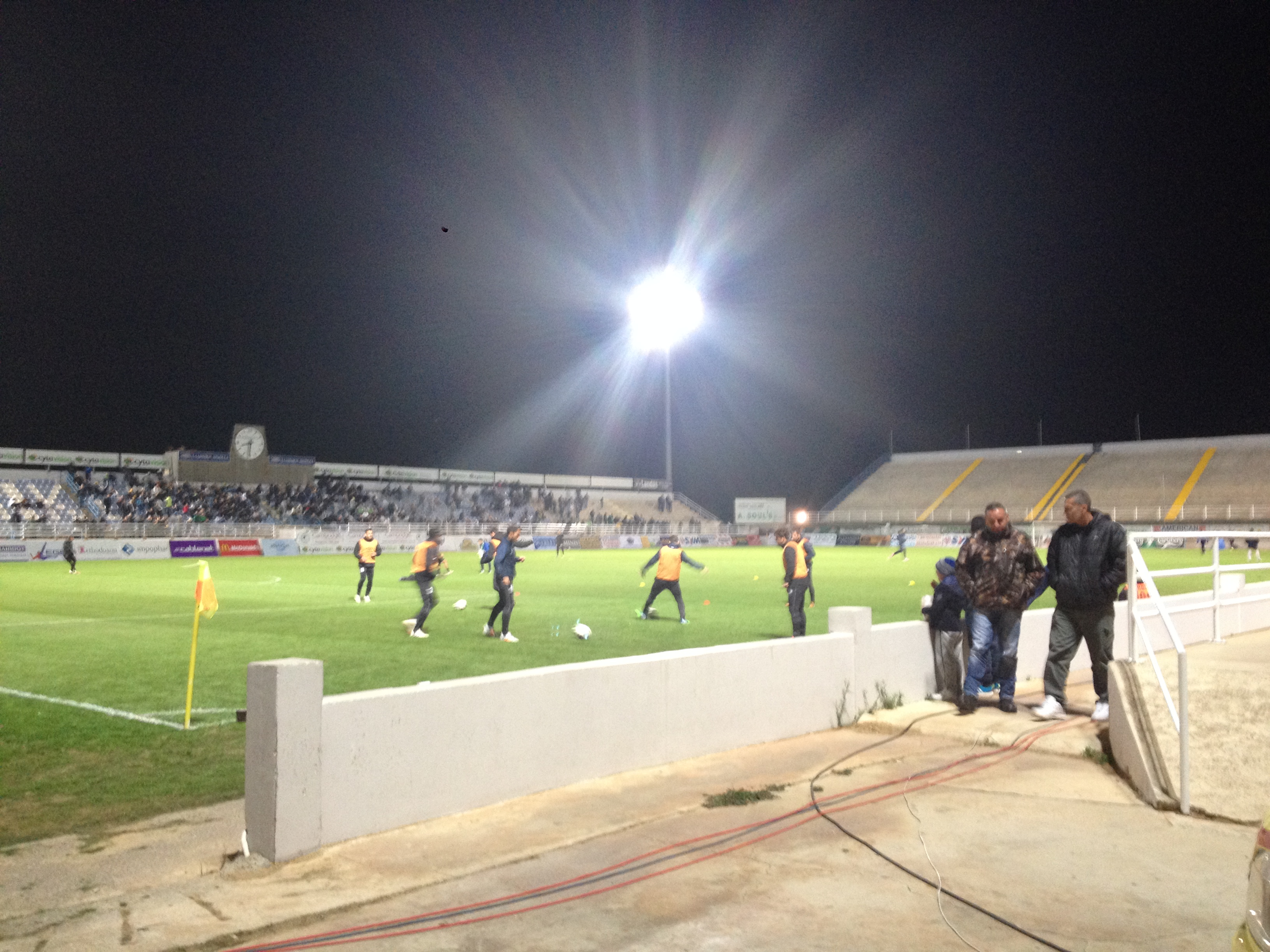
- Interactive map of Ethnikos Achnas Stadium
- Full name: Ethnikos Achnas Stadium (Greek: Δασάκι)
- Location: Dasaki Achnas, Sovereign Base Areas of Akrotiri and Dhekelia, Cyprus
- Capacity: 5,422

Construction
- Built: 1976; 50 years ago

Tenants
- Ethnikos Achna (1976–); Ermis Aradippou FC (2009–2010, 2014–2015); P.O. Xylotymbou (2017–2018); UEFA U-17 Championship (2024)

Dasaki Stadium is a multi-purpose stadium in Dasaki Achnas, Akrotiri and Dhekelia, Cyprus. It is used mostly for football matches and is the home ground of Ethnikos Achna FC. The stadium holds 5,422 people and was built in 1976.
