= 2015 Belarusian Premier League (women) =

Belarusian Premier League (women)
- Season: 2015
- Champions: FC Minsk (3rd title)
- Champions League: FC Minsk
- Matches: 60
- Goals: 304 (5.07 per match)
- Top goalscorer: Uchechi Sunday (23)
- All statistics correct as of 19 October 2015.

The 2015 Belarusian Premier League (women) was the 25th season of women's league football under the Football Federation of Belarus.

The season was played between 19 April 2015 and 10 October 2015. FC Minsk successfully defended their title winning the league for the third year running and qualifying to the 2016–17 UEFA Women's Champions League.

== League table ==
Pos	Team	Pld	W	D	L	GF	GA	GD	Pts	Qualification
1	FC Minsk	20	16	3	1	104	10	+94	51	Qualification to Champions League
2	Zorka-BDU Minsk	20	16	3	1	86	10	+76	51	
3	Nadezhda Mogilev	20	11	2	7	38	21	+17	35	
4	Bobruichanka Bobruisk	20	8	0	12	53	35	+18	24	
5	Niva-BelCard Grodno	20	5	0	15	21	91	−70	15	
6	Universitet Vitebsk	20	0	0	20	2	137	−135	0	

== Results ==
Home \ Away	BOB	MIN	NAD	NIV	UNI	ZOR	BOB	MIN	NAD	NIV	UNI	ZOR
Bobruichanka Bobruisk		0–2	0–1	4–0	12–0	0–3		1–4	0–1	7–1	4–0	0–3
FC Minsk	3–0		5–0	4–0	9–0	1–1	5–1		3–1	11–0	10–1	3–1
Nadezhda Mogilev	2–1	0–0		4–0	5–0	0–1	0–2	0–2		3–1	10–0	0–1
Niva-BelCard Grodno	6–2	1–5	1–2		1–0	0–5	0–7	0–14	0–4		4–0	0–5
Universitet Vitebsk	0–5	0–14	0–2	0–4		1–14	0–6	0–7	0–2	0–1		0–7
Zorka-BDU Minsk	1–0	1–1	1–1	5–1	8–0		3–1	2–1	3–0	9–0	12–0	

Updated to match(es) played on 19 October 2015. Source: Soccerway
Legend: Blue = home team win; Yellow = draw; Red = away team win.

== Top scorers ==
As per 19 October 2015.

Rank	Scorer	Club	Goals
1	(Nigeria) Uchechi Sunday	FC Minsk	23
2	(Belarus) Liana Mirashnichenka	FC Minsk	18
3	(Belarus) Anastasiya Popova	Zorka-BDU Minsk	16
4	(Belarus) Tatyana Shramok	Zorka-BDU Minsk	13
5	(Belarus) Tatiana Markushevskaya	Zorka-BDU Minsk	11
5	(Belarus) Anna Pilipenko	FC Minsk	11
7	(Belarus) Anastasiya Linnyk	Zorka-BDU Minsk	10
8	(Belarus) Yuliya Duben	FC Minsk	9
8	(Belarus) Tatiana Krasnova	Bobruichanka Bobruisk	9
8	(Belarus) Yulia Slesarchik	Zorka-BDU Minsk	9
8	(Nigeria) Esther Sunday	FC Minsk	9
8	(Belarus) Svetlana Znaidzionava	Nadezhda Mogilev	9
