= 2014–15 UEFA Women's Champions League qualifying round =

Tournament details
- Dates: 09 – 14 August 2014
- Teams: 32

The 2014–15 UEFA Women's Champions League qualifying round was played on 9, 11 and 14 August 2014. A total of 32 teams competed in the qualifying round to decide 10 of the 32 places in the knockout phase of the 2014–15 UEFA Women's Champions League.

== Draw ==
The draw was held on 26 June 2014, 14:00 CEST, at UEFA headquarters in Nyon, Switzerland. The 32 teams were allocated into four pots based on their UEFA club coefficients at the beginning of the season. They were drawn into eight groups of four containing one team from each of the four seeding pots, with the restriction that each group must contain one of the eight teams which were pre-selected as hosts.

Below were the 32 teams which participated in the qualifying round (with their 2014 UEFA club coefficients). Teams pre-selected as hosts are marked by (H).

Key to colours
Group winners and best two runners-up advanced to the round of 32

Pot 1
Team	Coeff
(Scotland) Glasgow City (H)	29.260
(Switzerland) Zürich	23.600
(Belgium) Standard Liège	22.270
(Cyprus) Apollon Limassol	21.280
(Hungary) MTK	16.285
(Romania) Olimpia Cluj (H)	15.620
(Serbia) Spartak Subotica	13.950
(Bosnia and Herzegovina) SFK 2000 (H)	13.300

Pot 2
Team	Coeff
(Ukraine) Zhytlobud Kharkiv	10.960
(Turkey) Konak Belediyespor	10.300
(Bulgaria) NSA Sofia	9.975
(Israel) ASA Tel Aviv	9.640
(Finland) Åland United	7.950
(Croatia) Osijek (H)	6.650
(Faroe Islands) KÍ Klaksvík	6.650
(Slovenia) Pomurje	6.475

Pot 3
Team	Coeff
(Poland) Medyk Konin	6.105
(Estonia) Pärnu JK	5.650
(Lithuania) Gintra Universitetas (H)	5.320
(Portugal) Atlético Ouriense (H)	4.305
(Slovakia) Nové Zámky	4.140
(Belarus) FC Minsk	4.125
(Greece) Amazones Dramas	4.125
(Republic of Ireland) Raheny United	3.640

Pot 4
Team	Coeff
(Northern Ireland) Glentoran Belfast United	2.660
(Montenegro) Ekonomist (H)	1.330
(Wales) Cardiff Met.	0.990
(North Macedonia) Kočani	0.990
(Moldova) Goliador Chișinău	0.165
(Albania) Vllaznia	0.000
(Latvia) Rīgas FS (H)	0.000
(Malta) Hibernians	0.000

== Format ==
In each group, teams played against each other in a round-robin mini-tournament at the pre-selected hosts. The eight group winners and the two runners-up with the best record against the first and third-placed teams in their group advanced to the round of 32.

=== Tiebreakers ===
The teams were ranked according to points (3 points for a win, 1 point for a draw, 0 points for a loss). If two or more teams were equal on points on completion of the group matches, the following criteria were applied in the order given to determine the rankings (regulations Article 14.01):

1. Higher number of points obtained in the group matches played among the teams in question;
2. Superior goal difference resulting from the group matches played among the teams in question;
3. Higher number of goals scored in the group matches played among the teams in question;
4. If, after having applied criteria 1 to 4, teams still had an equal ranking, criteria 1 to 3 were reapplied exclusively to the matches between the teams in question to determine their final rankings. If this procedure did not lead to a decision, criteria 5 to 9 applied;
5. Superior goal difference in all group matches;
6. Higher number of goals scored in group matches;
7. If only two teams have the same number of points, and they were tied according to criteria 1 to 6 after having met in the last round of the group, their rankings were determined by a penalty shoot-out (not used if more than two teams had the same number of points, or if their rankings were not relevant for qualification for the next stage).
8. Higher club coefficient;
9. Drawing of lots.

To determine the two best runners-up from the qualifying round, the results against the teams in fourth place were discarded. The following criteria were applied:

1. Higher number of points;
2. Superior goal difference;
3. Higher number of goals scored;
4. Higher club coefficient;
5. Lower disciplinary points total based only on yellow and red cards received (red card = 3 points, yellow card = 1 point, expulsion for two yellow cards in one match = 3 points);
6. Drawing of lots.

== Groups ==
All times were CEST (UTC+2).

=== Group 1 ===
Pos	Team	Pld	W	D	L	GF	GA	GD	Pts	Qualification	ZÜR	KON	MIN	RIG
1	(Switzerland) Zürich	3	2	1	0	7	1	+6	7	Advance to knockout phase	—	—	1–1	2–0
2	(Turkey) Konak Belediyespor	3	2	0	1	13	5	+8	6		0–4	—	—	11–0
3	(Belarus) FC Minsk	3	1	1	1	9	3	+6	4		—	1–2	—	—
4	(Latvia) Rīgas FS (H)	3	0	0	3	0	20	−20	0		—	—	0–7	—

Source: UEFA
Rules for classification: Group stage tiebreakers
(H) Hosts
9 August 2014
12:00

Zürich (Switzerland)	1–1	(Belarus) FC Minsk
Humm 26'	Report	Sunday 45+3'

Stadions Arkādija, Riga
Attendance: 260
Referee: Sandra Bastos (Portugal)
9 August 2014
17:00

Konak Belediyespor (Turkey)	11–0	(Latvia) Rīgas FS
Dușa 6', 23', 42', 43', 49'; Uraz 16', 35', 50'; Yağ 37'; Sârghe 38'; Topçu 39'	Report

Stadions Arkādija, Riga
Attendance: 300
Referee: Marte Sørø (Norway)

11 August 2014
12:00

FC Minsk (Belarus)	1–2	(Turkey) Konak Belediyespor
Kharlanova 45+2'	Report	Topçu 53', 67'

Stadions Arkādija, Riga
Attendance: 50
Referee: Marte Sørø (Norway)
11 August 2014
17:00

Zürich (Switzerland)	2–0	(Latvia) Rīgas FS
Deplazes 44'; Fischer 47'	Report

Stadions Arkādija, Riga
Attendance: 60
Referee: Graziella Pirriatore (Italy)

14 August 2014
17:00

Konak Belediyespor (Turkey)	0–4	(Switzerland) Zürich
	Report	Kuster 16' (pen.); Humm 63'; Stierli 67'; Terchoun 76'

Daugava Stadium, Riga
Attendance: 20
Referee: Sandra Bastos (Portugal)
14 August 2014
17:00

Rīgas FS (Latvia)	0–7	(Belarus) FC Minsk
	Report	Ishola 20'; Miroshnichenko 29'; Otuwe 33'; Kenda 52'; Buzunova 53', 55'; Sunday 59'

Stadions Arkādija, Riga
Attendance: 120
Referee: Graziella Pirriatore (Italy)

=== Group 2 ===
Pos	Team	Pld	W	D	L	GF	GA	GD	Pts	Qualification	RAH	CLU	SOF	HIB
1	(Republic of Ireland) Raheny United	3	3	0	0	6	2	+4	9	Advance to knockout phase	—	—	2–0	—
2	(Romania) Olimpia Cluj (H)	3	2	0	1	10	3	+7	6		1–2	—	—	5–0
3	(Bulgaria) NSA Sofia	3	1	0	2	6	6	0	3		—	1–4	—	5–0
4	(Malta) Hibernians	3	0	0	3	1	12	−11	0		1–2	—	—	—

Source: UEFA
Rules for classification: Group stage tiebreakers
(H) Hosts
9 August 2014
14:00

NSA Sofia (Bulgaria)	5–0	(Malta) Hibernians
Asenova 43', 62'; Koshuleva 60'; Demicoli 81' (o.g.); Sho. Zammit 90' (o.g.)	Report

Cluj Arena, Cluj-Napoca
Attendance: 50
Referee: Ana Minić (Serbia)
9 August 2014
17:30

Olimpia Cluj (Romania)	1–2	(Republic of Ireland) Raheny United
Voicu 62'	Report	Murray 23'; Shine 81'

Cluj Arena, Cluj-Napoca
Attendance: 300
Referee: Elia Martínez (Spain)

11 August 2014
14:00

Raheny United (Republic of Ireland)	2–0	(Bulgaria) NSA Sofia
Shine 45+2', 50'	Report

Cluj Arena, Cluj-Napoca
Attendance: 30
Referee: Ana Minić (Serbia)
11 August 2014
17:30

Olimpia Cluj (Romania)	5–0	(Malta) Hibernians
Voicu 7'; Vágó 45+1', 49', 80'; Bâtea 71'	Report

Cluj Arena, Cluj-Napoca
Attendance: 200
Referee: Tania Morais (Luxembourg)

14 August 2014
17:00

NSA Sofia (Bulgaria)	1–4	(Romania) Olimpia Cluj
Popadiynova 81'	Report	Vágó 41', 69'; Vătafu 56'; Iuşan 83'

Cluj Arena, Cluj-Napoca
Attendance: 200
Referee: Elia Martínez (Spain)
14 August 2014
17:00

Hibernians (Malta)	1–2	(Republic of Ireland) Raheny United
Tonna 15'	Report	Cronin 38'; Shine 79'

Stadionul Victoria Someșeni, Cluj-Napoca
Attendance: 45
Referee: Tania Morais (Luxembourg)

=== Group 3 ===
Pos	Team	Pld	W	D	L	GF	GA	GD	Pts	Qualification	MTK	POM	PÄR	EKO
1	(Hungary) MTK	3	3	0	0	6	1	+5	9	Advance to knockout phase	—	—	3–0	1–0
2	(Slovenia) Pomurje	3	2	0	1	9	2	+7	6	Advance to knockout phase	1–2	—	—	4–0
3	(Estonia) Pärnu JK	3	1	0	2	2	8	−6	3		—	0–4	—	—
4	(Montenegro) Ekonomist (H)	3	0	0	3	1	7	−6	0		—	—	1–2	—

Source: UEFA
Rules for classification: Group stage tiebreakers
(H) Hosts
9 August 2014
17:00

MTK (Hungary)	3–0	(Estonia) Pärnu JK
Papp 45+4'; Kaján 67', 73'	Report

Stadion Pod Malim Brdom, Petrova
Attendance: 65
Referee: Sharon Sluyts (Belgium)
9 August 2014
17:00

Pomurje (Slovenia)	4–0	(Montenegro) Ekonomist
Vrabel 13', 58'; Zver 25', 43'	Report

Gradski stadion, Nikšić
Attendance: 200
Referee: Vesna Budimir (Croatia)

11 August 2014
17:00

MTK (Hungary)	1–0	(Montenegro) Ekonomist
Nagy 58'	Report

Gradski stadion, Nikšić
Attendance: 150
Referee: Kristina Husballe (Denmark)
11 August 2014
17:00

Pärnu JK (Estonia)	0–4	(Slovenia) Pomurje
	Report	Vrabel 17', 70'; Kolbl 79'; Rogan 83'

Stadion Pod Malim Brdom, Petrova
Attendance: 85
Referee: Vesna Budimir (Croatia)

14 August 2014
17:00

Pomurje (Slovenia)	1–2	(Hungary) MTK
Papp 23' (o.g.)	Report	Gál 29'; Pádár 87' (pen.)

Stadion Pod Malim Brdom, Petrova
Attendance: 100
Referee: Sharon Sluyts (Belgium)
14 August 2014
17:00

Ekonomist (Montenegro)	1–2	(Estonia) Pärnu JK
Krivokapić 77'	Report	Pajo 26'; Morkovkina 86'

Gradski stadion, Nikšić
Attendance: 150
Referee: Kristina Husballe (Denmark)

=== Group 4 ===
Pos	Team	Pld	W	D	L	GF	GA	GD	Pts	Qualification	GLA	KHA	BEL	NOV
1	(Scotland) Glasgow City (H)	3	3	0	0	10	0	+10	9	Advance to knockout phase	—	—	1–0	5–0
2	(Ukraine) Zhytlobud Kharkiv	3	2	0	1	8	5	+3	6		0–4	—	5–0	—
3	(Northern Ireland) Glentoran Belfast United	3	1	0	2	5	8	−3	3		—	—	—	5–2
4	(Slovakia) Nové Zámky	3	0	0	3	3	13	−10	0		—	1–3	—	—

Source: UEFA
Rules for classification: Group stage tiebreakers
(H) Hosts
9 August 2014
15:30

Zhytlobud Kharkiv (Ukraine)	5–0	(Northern Ireland) Belfast United
Voronina 15'; Mozolska 31', 36'; Foy 57' (o.g.); Nesterenko 81'	Report

Falkirk Stadium, Falkirk
Attendance: 52
Referee: Simona Ghisletta (Switzerland)
9 August 2014
20:45

Glasgow City (Scotland)	5–0	(Slovakia) Nové Zámky
McCulloch 26'; McSorley 28', 90+4'; Lappin 32'; O'Sullivan 61'	Report

Excelsior Stadium, Airdrie
Attendance: 276
Referee: Florence Guillemin (France)

11 August 2014
15:30

Nové Zámky (Slovakia)	1–3	(Ukraine) Zhytlobud Kharkiv
Orji 90+1'	Report	Kostyuchenko 12'; Voronina 70'; Znaidenova 74'

Excelsior Stadium, Airdrie
Attendance: 46
Referee: Simona Ghisletta (Switzerland)
11 August 2014
20:45

Glasgow City (Scotland)	1–0	(Northern Ireland) Belfast United
Whyte 41'	Report

Excelsior Stadium, Airdrie
Attendance: 301
Referee: Barbara Bollenberg (Austria)

14 August 2014
17:00

Zhytlobud Kharkiv (Ukraine)	0–4	(Scotland) Glasgow City
	Report	O'Sullivan 10', 63'; Love 18'; Brown 57'

Excelsior Stadium, Airdrie
Attendance: 194
Referee: Florence Guillemin (France)
14 August 2014
17:00

Belfast United (Northern Ireland)	5–2	(Slovakia) Nové Zámky
Montgomery 56'; Wade 62', 89'; Baxter 67'; Vance 76'	Report	Rybanská 23'; Břenková 81'

Broadwood Stadium, Cumbernauld
Attendance: 20
Referee: Barbara Bollenberg (Austria)

=== Group 5 ===
Pos	Team	Pld	W	D	L	GF	GA	GD	Pts	Qualification	OSI	SUB	DRA	CHI
1	(Croatia) Osijek (H)	3	3	0	0	16	1	+15	9	Advance to knockout phase	—	1–0	—	12–0
2	(Serbia) Spartak Subotica	3	2	0	1	22	1	+21	6		—	—	3–0	19–0
3	(Greece) Amazones Dramas	3	1	0	2	12	6	+6	3		1–3	—	—	—
4	(Moldova) Goliador Chișinău	3	0	0	3	0	42	−42	0		—	—	0–11	—

Source: UEFA
Rules for classification: Group stage tiebreakers
(H) Hosts
9 August 2014
17:00

Spartak Subotica (Serbia)	3–0	(Greece) Amazones Dramas
Marenić 32'; Nikolić 34'; Slović 90+5' (pen.)	Report

Cibalia Vinkovci, Vinkovci
Attendance: 100
Referee: Petra Chudá (Slovakia)
9 August 2014
20:00

Osijek (Croatia)	12–0	(Moldova) Goliador Chișinău
Lojna 1', 43', 78'; Andrlić 7', 45+2', 74'; Šalek 8', 45', 62'; Culek 25'; Balić 54', 69'	Report

Cibalia Vinkovci, Vinkovci
Attendance: 250
Referee: Leen Martens (Belgium)

11 August 2014
17:00

Spartak Subotica (Serbia)	19–0	(Moldova) Goliador Chișinău
Nikolić 11', 15', 21', 25', 34', 40', 47', 48'; Marenić 13'; Čanković 41'; Ilić 45'; Radanović 50'; Slović 57', 67' (pen.), 70'; Dragomir 63' (o.g.); Nrehy 80', 83', 90+1'	Report

Stadion Gradski vrt, Osijek
Attendance: 100
Referee: Kateryna Zora (Ukraine)
11 August 2014
20:00

Amazones Dramas (Greece)	1–3	(Croatia) Osijek
Birțoiu 74'	Report	Baban 34' (pen.); Šalek 45+3'; Joščak 57'

Stadion Gradski vrt, Osijek
Attendance: 500
Referee: Leen Martens (Belgium)

14 August 2014
17:00

Osijek (Croatia)	1–0	(Serbia) Spartak Subotica
Cepernić 7'	Report

Stadion Gradski vrt, Osijek
Attendance: 420
Referee: Petra Chudá (Slovakia)
14 August 2014
17:00

Goliador Chișinău (Moldova)	0–11	(Greece) Amazones Dramas
	Report	Chatzioglou 13', 34', 87'; Papadopoulou 24', 36' (pen.), 77'; Mitkou 44', 67', 68', 74', 80'

Cibalia Vinkovci, Vinkovci
Attendance: 50
Referee: Kateryna Zora (Ukraine)

=== Group 6 ===
Pos	Team	Pld	W	D	L	GF	GA	GD	Pts	Qualification	APO	UNI	VLL	KÍK
1	(Cyprus) Apollon Limassol	3	2	1	0	6	2	+4	7	Advance to knockout phase	—	3–1	0–0	—
2	(Lithuania) Gintra Universitetas (H)	3	2	0	1	8	3	+5	6	Advance to knockout phase	—	—	—	2–0
3	(Albania) Vllaznia	3	1	1	1	2	6	−4	4		—	0–5	—	—
4	(Faroe Islands) KÍ Klaksvík	3	0	0	3	2	7	−5	0		1–3	—	1–2	—

Source: UEFA
Rules for classification: Group stage tiebreakers
(H) Hosts

Gintra finished as best runners-up and advanced from a mini-tournament for the first time after nine unsuccessful attempts. Vllaznia were the first Albanian team to win points in the competition.

9 August 2014
15:00

KÍ Klaksvík (Faroe Islands)	1–2	(Albania) Vllaznia
E. Klakstein 31'	Report	Jashari 39'; Doci 48'

Savivaldybė Stadium, Šiauliai
Attendance: 65
Referee: Melis Özçiğdem (Turkey)
9 August 2014
19:00

Apollon Limassol (Cyprus)	3–1	(Lithuania) Gintra Universitetas
Gilmore 23', 62'; Cuschieri 64'	Report	Vanagaitė 49'

Savivaldybė Stadium, Šiauliai
Attendance: 450
Referee: Marija Kurtes (Germany)

11 August 2014
15:00

Apollon Limassol (Cyprus)	0–0	(Albania) Vllaznia
	Report

Savivaldybė Stadium, Šiauliai
Attendance: 100
Referee: Nelli Stepanyan (Armenia)
11 August 2014
19:00

Gintra Universitetas (Lithuania)	2–0	(Faroe Islands) KÍ Klaksvík
Alekperova 55' (pen.); Wardum 84' (o.g.)	Report

Savivaldybė Stadium, Šiauliai
Attendance: 250
Referee: Melis Özçiğdem (Turkey)

14 August 2014
17:00

KÍ Klaksvík (Faroe Islands)	1–3	(Cyprus) Apollon Limassol
Ioannou 19' (o.g.)	Report	Violari 15'; Sidira 26'; Brito 60'

Pakruojis City Stadium, Pakruojis
Attendance: 90
Referee: Marija Kurtes (Germany)
14 August 2014
17:00

Vllaznia (Albania)	0–5	(Lithuania) Gintra Universitetas
	Report	Vanagaitė 55'; Veličkaitė 63', 79'; Imanalijeva 85'; Budrytė 90+4'

Savivaldybė Stadium, Šiauliai
Attendance: 300
Referee: Nelli Stepanyan (Armenia)

=== Group 7 ===
Pos	Team	Pld	W	D	L	GF	GA	GD	Pts	Qualification	KON	SFK	ÅLA	KOČ
1	(Poland) Medyk Konin	3	3	0	0	21	1	+20	9	Advance to knockout phase	—	—	7–0	—
2	(Bosnia and Herzegovina) SFK 2000 (H)	3	2	0	1	8	3	+5	6		0–3	—	—	7–0
3	(Finland) Åland United	3	1	0	2	4	8	−4	3		—	0–1	—	4–0
4	(North Macedonia) Kočani	3	0	0	3	1	22	−21	0		1–11	—	—	—

Source: UEFA
Rules for classification: Group stage tiebreakers
(H) Hosts
9 August 2014
10:30

SFK 2000 (Bosnia and Herzegovina)	0–3	(Poland) Medyk Konin
	Report	Pajor 6'; Gawrońska 14'; Pakulska 53'

Stadion Otoka, Sarajevo
Attendance: 300
Referee: Sara Persson (Sweden)
9 August 2014
16:30

Åland United (Finland)	4–0	(North Macedonia) Kočani
Robbins 18'; Saario 41'; Dolinsky 68'; Uwak 88'	Report

Stadion Otoka, Sarajevo
Attendance: 50
Referee: Paula Brady (Republic of Ireland)

11 August 2014
10:30

SFK 2000 (Bosnia and Herzegovina)	7–0	(North Macedonia) Kočani
Kuć 10'; Hršum 15'; Djoković 21'; Šešlija 36'; Al. Spahić 45'; Jašarević 49'; Numanović 86'	Report

Stadion Otoka, Sarajevo
Attendance: 150
Referee: Knarik Grigoryan (Armenia)
11 August 2014
16:30

Medyk Konin (Poland)	7–0	(Finland) Åland United
Pajor 22', 48', 84', 90+1'; Gawrońska 44'; Sikora 53'; Kamczyk 79'	Report

Stadion Otoka, Sarajevo
Attendance: 100
Referee: Paula Brady (Republic of Ireland)

14 August 2014
17:00

Åland United (Finland)	0–1	(Bosnia and Herzegovina) SFK 2000
	Report	Hršum 41'

Stadion Otoka, Sarajevo
Attendance: 250
Referee: Sara Persson (Sweden)
14 August 2014
17:00

Kočani (North Macedonia)	1–11	(Poland) Medyk Konin
Jakovska 60'	Report	Pakulska 4', 71'; Gawrońska 7', 56', 78'; Kamczyk 9'; Pajor 35', 58'; Dudek 49'; Žigić 81'; Zawiślak 86' (pen.)

Asim Ferhatović Hase Stadium, Sarajevo
Attendance: 25
Referee: Knarik Grigoryan (Armenia)

=== Group 8 ===
Pos	Team	Pld	W	D	L	GF	GA	GD	Pts	Qualification	OUR	LIE	TEL	CAR
1	(Portugal) Atlético Ouriense (H)	3	2	0	1	4	3	+1	6	Advance to knockout phase	—	—	2–1	—
2	(Belgium) Standard Liège	3	2	0	1	11	1	+10	6		0–1	—	—	10–0
3	(Israel) ASA Tel Aviv	3	1	0	2	3	3	0	3		—	0–1	—	2–0
4	(Wales) Cardiff Met.	3	1	0	2	2	13	−11	3		2–1	—	—	—

Source: UEFA
Rules for classification: Group stage tiebreakers
(H) Hosts
9 August 2014
17:00

Standard Liège (Belgium)	0–1	(Portugal) Atlético Ouriense
	Report	Silva 83'

Estádio Municipal, Fátima
Attendance: 800
Referee: Eszter Urbán (Hungary)
9 August 2014
17:00

ASA Tel Aviv (Israel)	2–0	(Wales) Cardiff Met.
Lavi 34' (pen.); Shenar 85'	Report

Estádio Dr. Magalhães Pessoa, Leiria
Attendance: 20
Referee: Marta Acedo (Spain)

11 August 2014
17:00

Standard Liège (Belgium)	10–0	(Wales) Cardiff Met.
Zeler 23' (pen.), 45+1', 54', 56', 58'; Lewerissa 25', 61'; Coutereels 33', 83'; De Gernier 74'	Report

Estádio Dr. Magalhães Pessoa, Leiria
Attendance: 40
Referee: Viola Raudziņa (Latvia)
11 August 2014
17:00

Atlético Ouriense (Portugal)	2–1	(Israel) ASA Tel Aviv
Coelho 69'; Pisco 89'	Report	Paz 79'

Estádio Municipal, Fátima
Attendance: 700
Referee: Marta Acedo (Spain)

14 August 2014
17:00

ASA Tel Aviv (Israel)	0–1	(Belgium) Standard Liège
	Report	Schoenmakers 17'

Estádio Dr. Magalhães Pessoa, Leiria
Attendance: 60
Referee: Eszter Urbán (Hungary)
14 August 2014
17:00

Cardiff Met (Wales)	2–1	(Portugal) Atlético Ouriense
Allen 35'; Sargent 90+1'	Report	Coelho 14'

Estádio Municipal, Fátima
Attendance: 700
Referee: Viola Raudziņa (Latvia)

== Ranking of group runners-up ==
The two best runners-up also qualified for the round of 32. The match against the fourth-placed team in the group did not count for the purposes of the runners-up table.

Pos	Grp	Team	Pld	W	D	L	GF	GA	GD	Pts	Qualification
1	6	(Lithuania) Gintra Universitetas	2	1	0	1	6	3	+3	3	Advance to knockout phase
2	3	(Slovenia) Pomurje	2	1	0	1	5	2	+3	3	Advance to knockout phase
3	2	(Romania) Olimpia Cluj	2	1	0	1	5	3	+2	3	
4	5	(Serbia) Spartak Subotica	2	1	0	1	3	1	+2	3	
5	4	(Ukraine) Zhytlobud Kharkiv	2	1	0	1	5	4	+1	3	
6	8	(Belgium) Standard Liège	2	1	0	1	1	1	0	3	
7	7	(Bosnia and Herzegovina) SFK 2000	2	1	0	1	1	3	−2	3	
8	1	(Turkey) Konak Belediyespor	2	1	0	1	2	5	−3	3	

Source: UEFA
Rules for classification: 1) points; 2) goal difference; 3) number of goals scored; 4) club coefficient; 5) disciplinary points; 6) drawing of lots.

== Statistics ==
There were 218 goals in 48 matches in the qualifying round, for an average of 4.54 goals per match.

=== Top goalscorers ===
Rank	Player	Team	Goals	Minutes played
1	(Bosnia and Herzegovina) Milena Nikolić	(Serbia) Spartak Subotica	9	255
2	(Poland) Ewa Pajor	(Poland) Medyk Konin	7	223
3	(Belgium) Aline Zeler	(Belgium) Standard Liège	5	245
3	(Romania) Cosmina Dușa	(Turkey) Konak Belediyespor	5	270
3	(Poland) Anna Gawrońska	(Poland) Medyk Konin	5	270
3	(Greece) Maria Mitkou	(Greece) Amazones Dramas	5	270
3	(Hungary) Fanny Vágó	(Romania) Olimpia Cluj	5	270
8	(Slovenia) Tanja Vrabel	(Slovenia) Pomurje	4	258
8	(Republic of Ireland) Clare Shine	(Republic of Ireland) Raheny United	4	265
8	(Serbia) Violeta Slović	(Serbia) Spartak Subotica	4	265
8	(Croatia) Martina Šalek	(Croatia) Osijek	4	270

Source: UEFA.com
