= 2015–16 UEFA Women's Champions League qualifying round =

Football tournament qualification stage

Tournament details
- Dates: 11– 16 August 2015
- Teams: 32

The 2015–16 UEFA Women's Champions League qualifying round was played on 11, 13 and 16 August 2015. A total of 32 teams competed in the qualifying round to decide eight of the 32 places in the knockout phase of the 2015–16 UEFA Women's Champions League.

== Draw ==
The draw was held on 25 June 2015, 13:30 CEST, at the UEFA headquarters in Nyon, Switzerland. The 32 teams were allocated into four seeding positions based on their UEFA club coefficients at the beginning of the season. They were drawn into eight groups of four containing one team from each of the four seeding positions. First, the eight teams which were pre-selected as hosts were drawn from their own designated pot and allocated to their respective group as per their seeding positions. Next, the remaining 24 teams were drawn from their respective pot which were allocated according to their seeding positions.

Below are the 32 teams which participated in the qualifying round (with their 2015 UEFA club coefficients, which took into account their performance in European competitions from 2010–11 to 2014–15 plus 33% of their association coefficient from the same time span), with the eight teams which were pre-selected as hosts marked by (H).

Key to colours
Group winners advanced to the round of 32

Seeding position 1
Team	Coeff
(Cyprus) Apollon Limassol (H)	25.270
(Romania) Olimpia Cluj	17.620
(Serbia) Spartak Subotica	15.620
(Lithuania) Gintra Universitetas	14.630
(Netherlands) Twente (H)	14.610
(Finland) PK-35 Vantaa (H)	13.290
(Greece) PAOK	12.965
(Turkey) Konak Belediyespor	12.630

Seeding position 2
Team	Coeff
(Iceland) Stjarnan	12.610
(Bosnia and Herzegovina) SFK 2000 (H)	11.970
(Poland) Medyk Konin (H)	11.105
(Croatia) ŽNK Osijek (H)	10.640
(Israel) ASA Tel Aviv	10.640
(Slovenia) Pomurje (H)	10.300
(Ukraine) Zhytlobud-1 Kharkiv	9.630
(Bulgaria) NSA Sofia	8.645

Seeding position 3
Team	Coeff
(Estonia) Pärnu JK	6.650
(Faroe Islands) KÍ Klaksvík	5.320
(Belarus) FC Minsk	5.130
(Hungary) Ferencváros	5.115
(Slovakia) Nové Zámky	3.645
(Republic of Ireland) Wexford Youths	3.630
(Portugal) CF Benfica	3.135
(Northern Ireland) Glentoran Belfast United (H)	2.660

Seeding position 4
Team	Coeff
(Albania) Vllaznia	1.995
(Wales) Cardiff Met.	1.990
(Montenegro) Ekonomist	1.330
(North Macedonia) ŽFK Dragon 2014	0.990
(Moldova) Noroc Nimoreni	0.165
(Malta) Hibernians	0.000
(Latvia) Rīgas FS	0.000
(Luxembourg) Jeunesse Junglinster	0.000

== Format ==
In each group, teams played against each other in a round-robin mini-tournament at the pre-selected hosts. The eight group winners advanced to the round of 32 to join the 24 teams which qualified directly.

=== Tiebreakers ===
The teams were ranked according to points (3 points for a win, 1 point for a draw, 0 points for a loss). If two or more teams were equal on points on completion of the group matches, the following criteria were applied in the order given to determine the rankings (regulations Articles 14.01 and 14.02):

1. higher number of points obtained in the group matches played among the teams in question;
2. superior goal difference from the group matches played among the teams in question;
3. higher number of goals scored in the group matches played among the teams in question;
4. if, after having applied criteria 1 to 3, teams still had an equal ranking, criteria 1 to 3 were reapplied exclusively to the matches between the teams in question to determine their final rankings. If this procedure did not lead to a decision, criteria 5 to 9 applied;
5. superior goal difference in all group matches;
6. higher number of goals scored in all group matches;
7. if only two teams had the same number of points, and they were tied according to criteria 1 to 6 after having met in the last round of the group, their rankings were determined by a penalty shoot-out (not used if more than two teams had the same number of points, or if their rankings were not relevant for qualification for the next stage).
8. lower disciplinary points total based only on yellow and red cards received in all group matches (red card = 3 points, yellow card = 1 point, expulsion for two yellow cards in one match = 3 points);
9. higher club coefficient.

== Groups ==
All times were CEST (UTC+2). All match attendances are provided by a source independent from UEFA.

=== Group 1 ===
Pos	Team	Pld	W	D	L	GF	GA	GD	Pts	Qualification	MIN	SFK	KON	VLL
1	(Belarus) FC Minsk	3	3	0	0	16	1	+15	9	Advanced to knockout phase	—	3–0	—	—
2	(Bosnia and Herzegovina) SFK 2000 (H)	3	2	0	1	8	4	+4	6		—	—	3–1	5–0
3	(Turkey) Konak Belediyespor	3	1	0	2	7	14	−7	3		1–10	—	—	5–1
4	(Albania) Vllaznia	3	0	0	3	1	13	−12	0		0–3	—	—	—

Source: UEFA
(H) Hosts
11 August 2015
10:00

SFK 2000 (Bosnia and Herzegovina)	5–0	(Albania) Vllaznia
Djoković 4', 67'; Kuć 12'; Hadžić 77'; Al. Spahić 79'	Report

Stadion Otoka, Sarajevo
Attendance: 300
Referee: Karolina Radzik-Johan (Poland)
11 August 2015
17:00

Konak Belediyespor (Turkey)	1–10	(Belarus) FC Minsk
Başkol 87'	Report	E. Sunday 10'; Miroshnichenko 15', 56'; U. Sunday 38', 47', 58', 71', 84'; Özgan 46' (o.g.); Ishola 80'

Stadion Otoka, Sarajevo
Attendance: 80
Referee: Lina Lehtovaara (Finland)

13 August 2015
10:00

FC Minsk (Belarus)	3–0	(Bosnia and Herzegovina) SFK 2000
Pilipenko 13'; U. Sunday 80'; Buzunova 89'	Report

Stadion Otoka, Sarajevo
Attendance: 350
Referee: Karolina Radzik-Johan (Poland)
13 August 2015
17:00

Konak Belediyespor (Turkey)	5–1	(Albania) Vllaznia
Çınar 11'; Nurlu 66'; Topçu 77'; Hız 82'; Yeniçeri 84'	Report	Bajraktari 16'

Stadion Otoka, Sarajevo
Attendance: 50
Referee: Lois Otte (Belgium)

16 August 2015
17:00

SFK 2000 (Bosnia and Herzegovina)	3–1	(Turkey) Konak Belediyespor
Djoković 44' (pen.), 55', 68' (pen.)	Report	Göksu 76'

Stadion Otoka, Sarajevo
Attendance: 100
Referee: Karolina Radzik-Johan (Poland)
16 August 2015
17:00

Vllaznia (Albania)	0–3	(Belarus) FC Minsk
	Report	Buzunova 19'; Pilipenko 25'; U. Sunday 27'

Asim Ferhatović Hase Stadium, Sarajevo
Attendance: 20
Referee: Lois Otte (Belgium)

=== Group 2 ===
Pos	Team	Pld	W	D	L	GF	GA	GD	Pts	Qualification	PAO	SOF	GLE	DRA
1	(Greece) PAOK	3	3	0	0	18	0	+18	9	Advanced to knockout phase	—	—	4–0	10–0
2	(Bulgaria) NSA Sofia	3	2	0	1	8	5	+3	6		0–4	—	—	6–0
3	(Northern Ireland) Glentoran Belfast United (H)	3	1	0	2	3	6	−3	3		—	1–2	—	—
4	(North Macedonia) ŽFK Dragon 2014	3	0	0	3	0	18	−18	0		—	—	0–2	—

Source: UEFA
(H) Hosts
11 August 2015
15:00

NSA Sofia (Bulgaria)	6–0	(North Macedonia) ŽFK Dragon 2014
Zhekova 15', 37'; Asenova 17'; Koshuleva 27'; Gospodinova 34'; Penkova 70'	Report

Seaview, Belfast
Attendance: 22
Referee: Tânia Fernandes Morais (Luxembourg)
11 August 2015
20:30

PAOK (Greece)	4–0	(Northern Ireland) Glentoran Belfast United
Dimitrijević 2', 75'; Markou 59'; Chatzigiannidou 73' (pen.)	Report

Seaview, Belfast
Attendance: 202
Referee: Zuzana Štrpková (Slovakia)

13 August 2015
15:00

PAOK (Greece)	10–0	(North Macedonia) ŽFK Dragon 2014
Dimitriou 37'; Panteliadou 39', 42', 49'; Dimitrijević 45+1', 62'; Kakambouki 51', 66'; Naceva 60' (o.g.); Chatzigiannidou 74' (pen.)	Report

Seaview, Belfast
Attendance: 36
Referee: Kseniya Goryacheva (Russia)
13 August 2015
20:30

Glentoran Belfast United (Northern Ireland)	1–2	(Bulgaria) NSA Sofia
Wade 15'	Report	Gospodinova 59'; Koshuleva 82'

Seaview, Belfast
Attendance: 220
Referee: Tânia Fernandes Morais (Luxembourg)

16 August 2015
17:00

NSA Sofia (Bulgaria)	0–4	(Greece) PAOK
	Report	Markou 44', 48'; Chamalidou 50'; Kakambouki 82'

Solitude, Belfast
Attendance: 10
Referee: Zuzana Štrpková (Slovakia)
16 August 2015
17:00

ŽFK Dragon 2014 (North Macedonia)	0–2	(Northern Ireland) Glentoran Belfast United
	Report	Rogan 31'; Wade 36'

Seaview, Belfast
Attendance: 172
Referee: Kseniya Goryacheva (Russia)

=== Group 3 ===
Pos	Team	Pld	W	D	L	GF	GA	GD	Pts	Qualification	STJ	APO	KLA	HIB
1	(Iceland) Stjarnan	3	3	0	0	11	0	+11	9	Advanced to knockout phase	—	2–0	—	5–0
2	(Cyprus) Apollon Limassol (H)	3	2	0	1	10	2	+8	6		—	—	2–0	8–0
3	(Faroe Islands) KÍ Klaksvík	3	0	1	2	3	9	−6	1		0–4	—	—	—
4	(Malta) Hibernians	3	0	1	2	3	16	−13	1		—	—	3–3	—

Source: UEFA
(H) Hosts
11 August 2015
18:00

Apollon Limassol (Cyprus)	2–0	(Faroe Islands) KÍ Klaksvík
Cameron 6'; Violari 33'	Report

Pafiako Stadium, Paphos
Attendance: 120
Referee: Anastasia Pustovoitova (Russia)
11 August 2015
18:00

Stjarnan (Iceland)	5–0	(Malta) Hibernians
Poliana 20', 47'; Francielle 28'; C. Zammit 39' (o.g.); Sigurðardóttir 90'	Report

Geroskipou Municipality Stadium, Geroskipou
Attendance: 25
Referee: Vesna Budimir (Croatia)

13 August 2015
18:00

KÍ Klaksvík (Faroe Islands)	0–4	(Iceland) Stjarnan
	Report	Pedersen 50'; Þorsteinsdóttir 62', 81'; Poliana 63'

Geroskipou Municipality Stadium, Geroskipou
Attendance: 30
Referee: Vesna Budimir (Croatia)
13 August 2015
19:00

Apollon Limassol (Cyprus)	8–0	(Malta) Hibernians
Chrysostomou 5'; Cameron 10', 90'; Kynossidou 15'; Violari 66'; Cuschieri 79', 82'; F. Antoniou 86'	Report

Pafiako Stadium, Paphos
Attendance: 200
Referee: Ivana Projkovska (Macedonia)

16 August 2015
18:00

Stjarnan (Iceland)	2–0	(Cyprus) Apollon Limassol
Poliana 45', 75'	Report

Pafiako Stadium, Paphos
Attendance: 300
Referee: Anastasia Pustovoitova (Russia)
16 August 2015
18:00

Hibernians (Malta)	3–3	(Faroe Islands) KÍ Klaksvík
Xuereb 45+1'; C. Zammit 61'; Theuma 90+3'	Report	Josephsen 14', 70'; Thomsen 62'

Geroskipou Municipality Stadium, Paphos
Attendance: 20
Referee: Ivana Projkovska (Macedonia)

=== Group 4 ===
Pos	Team	Pld	W	D	L	GF	GA	GD	Pts	Qualification	TWE	FER	TLV	JUN
1	(Netherlands) Twente (H)	3	3	0	0	19	0	+19	9	Advanced to knockout phase	—	2–0	—	10–0
2	(Hungary) Ferencváros	3	2	0	1	13	3	+10	6		—	—	2–1	—
3	(Israel) ASA Tel Aviv	3	1	0	2	6	10	−4	3		0–7	—	—	5–1
4	(Luxembourg) Jeunesse Junglinster	3	0	0	3	1	26	−25	0		—	0–11	—	—

Source: UEFA
(H) Hosts
11 August 2015
19:00

Twente (Netherlands)	2–0	(Hungary) Ferencváros
Renfurm 49'; R. Jansen 67'	Report

Sportpark Slangenbeek, Hengelo
Attendance: 600
Referee: Marte Sørø (Norway)
11 August 2015
19:00

ASA Tel Aviv (Israel)	5–1	(Luxembourg) Jeunesse Junglinster
Avital 36', 83'; Shenar 49', 65'; Graiver 78'	Report	Ghodbane 68'

Sportpark Vondersweijde, Oldenzaal
Attendance: 100
Referee: Rhona Daly (Republic of Ireland)

13 August 2015
19:00

Twente (Netherlands)	10–0	(Luxembourg) Jeunesse Junglinster
Roetgering 22' (pen.), 28' (pen.); Roord 34', 62'; R. Jansen 38'; Birkel 45' (o.g.); E. Jansen 65', 71'; Van de Sanden 77'; Kerkdijk 90+2'	Report

Sportpark Vondersweijde, Oldenzaal
Attendance: 550
Referee: Knarik Grigoryan (Armenia)
13 August 2015
19:00

Ferencváros (Hungary)	2–1	(Israel) ASA Tel Aviv
Orji 12', 89'	Report	Graiver 36'

Sportpark Slangenbeek, Hengelo
Attendance: 60
Referee: Rhona Daly (Republic of Ireland)

16 August 2015
16:00

ASA Tel Aviv (Israel)	0–7	(Netherlands) Twente
	Report	Roord 1', 29', 51', 57', 75'; Van de Sanden 15'; E. Jansen 74'

Sportpark Slangenbeek, Hengelo
Attendance: 500
Referee: Marte Sørø (Norway)
16 August 2015
16:00

Jeunesse Junglinster (Luxembourg)	0–11	(Hungary) Ferencváros
	Report	Zágor 4', 45', 45+1'; Orji 25', 26', 30', 40', 50', 73', 76'; Mosdóczi 90'

Sportpark Vondersweijde, Oldenzaal
Attendance: 75
Referee: Knarik Grigoryan (Armenia)

=== Group 5 ===
Pos	Team	Pld	W	D	L	GF	GA	GD	Pts	Qualification	CLU	POM	PÄR	EKO
1	(Romania) Olimpia Cluj	3	3	0	0	12	1	+11	9	Advanced to knockout phase	—	—	4–0	6–1
2	(Slovenia) Pomurje (H)	3	2	0	1	6	3	+3	6		0–2	—	—	4–0
3	(Estonia) Pärnu JK	3	1	0	2	3	7	−4	3		—	1–2	—	—
4	(Montenegro) Ekonomist	3	0	0	3	2	12	−10	0		—	—	1–2	—

Source: UEFA
(H) Hosts
11 August 2015
17:00

Olimpia Cluj (Romania)	4–0	(Estonia) Pärnu JK
Lunca 11', 63'; Voicu 41'; Olar 51'	Report

Beltinci Sports Park, Beltinci
Attendance: 30
Referee: Zuzana Kováčová (Slovakia)
11 August 2015
20:00

Pomurje (Slovenia)	4–0	(Montenegro) Ekonomist
Bradić 22', 37'; Conjar 66'; Podovac 89'	Report

Lendava Sports Park, Lendava
Attendance: 700
Referee: Sofia Karagiorgi (Cyprus)

13 August 2015
17:00

Olimpia Cluj (Romania)	6–1	(Montenegro) Ekonomist
Popa 39'; Nedić 40' (o.g.); Corduneanu 45+1'; Voicu 45+3'; Lunca 73', 81'	Report	Bojat 59'

Beltinci Sports Park, Beltinci
Attendance: 60
Referee: Marta Frías Acedo (Spain)
13 August 2015
20:00

Pärnu JK (Estonia)	1–2	(Slovenia) Pomurje
Morkovkina 8'	Report	Podovac 84'; Tibaut 87'

Lendava Sports Park, Lendava
Attendance: 500
Referee: Sofia Karagiorgi (Cyprus)

16 August 2015
17:00

Pomurje (Slovenia)	0–2	(Romania) Olimpia Cluj
	Report	Havristiuc 13'; Voicu 52'

Beltinci Sports Park, Beltinci
Attendance: 1,200
Referee: Zuzana Kováčová (Slovakia)
16 August 2015
17:00

Ekonomist (Montenegro)	1–2	(Estonia) Pärnu JK
Krivokapić 79'	Report	Ojala 7'; Himanen 12'

Lendava Sports Park, Lendava
Attendance: 22
Referee: Marta Frías Acedo (Spain)

=== Group 6 ===
Pos	Team	Pld	W	D	L	GF	GA	GD	Pts	Qualification	SUB	BEN	OSI	NOR
1	(Serbia) Spartak Subotica	3	3	0	0	9	2	+7	9	Advanced to knockout phase	—	2–1	—	4–1
2	(Portugal) CF Benfica	3	2	0	1	7	2	+5	6		—	—	3–0	—
3	(Croatia) ŽNK Osijek (H)	3	1	0	2	4	6	−2	3		0–3	—	—	4–0
4	(Moldova) Noroc Nimoreni	3	0	0	3	1	11	−10	0		—	0–3	—	—

Source: UEFA
(H) Hosts
11 August 2015
17:00

Spartak Subotica (Serbia)	2–1	(Portugal) CF Benfica
Matić 64'; Filipović 73'	Report	Fidalgo 87'

Stadion Gradski vrt, Osijek
Attendance: 150
Referee: Amy Rayner (England)
11 August 2015
20:00

ŽNK Osijek (Croatia)	4–0	(Moldova) Noroc Nimoreni
Šalek 65'; Lojna 66', 90+10'; Andrlić 83'	Report

Stadion Gradski vrt, Osijek
Attendance: 1,000
Referee: Florence Guillemin (France)

13 August 2015
17:00

Spartak Subotica (Serbia)	4–1	(Moldova) Noroc Nimoreni
Marenić 25', 47', 71', 75'	Report	Chiper 58'

Stadion Gradski vrt, Osijek
Attendance: 220
Referee: Barbara Bollenberg (Austria)
13 August 2015
20:00

CF Benfica (Portugal)	3–0	(Croatia) ŽNK Osijek
Patão 12'; Mafalda 50', 79'	Report

Stadion Gradski vrt, Osijek
Attendance: 1,000
Referee: Florence Guillemin (France)

16 August 2015
17:00

ŽNK Osijek (Croatia)	0–3	(Serbia) Spartak Subotica
	Report	Poljak 56', 80'; Cepernić 83' (o.g.)

Stadion Gradski vrt, Osijek
Attendance: 700
Referee: Amy Rayner (England)
16 August 2015
17:00

Noroc Nimoreni (Moldova)	0–3	(Portugal) CF Benfica
	Report	Coelho 21'; Flores 24', 48'

Stadion HNK Cibalia, Vinkovci
Attendance: 50
Referee: Barbara Bollenberg (Austria)

=== Group 7 ===
Pos	Team	Pld	W	D	L	GF	GA	GD	Pts	Qualification	MED	WEX	GIN	CAR
1	(Poland) Medyk Konin (H)	3	3	0	0	15	0	+15	9	Advanced to knockout phase	—	—	4–0	5–0
2	(Republic of Ireland) Wexford Youths	3	2	0	1	6	7	−1	6		0–6	—	—	—
3	(Lithuania) Gintra Universitetas	3	1	0	2	5	6	−1	3		—	0–1	—	5–1
4	(Wales) Cardiff Met.	3	0	0	3	2	15	−13	0		—	1–5	—	—

Source: UEFA
(H) Hosts
11 August 2015
15:30

Gintra Universitetas (Lithuania)	0–1	(Republic of Ireland) Wexford Youths
	Report	Gleeson 67'

Kleczew Stadium, Kleczew
Attendance: 300
Referee: Eleni Lampadariou (Greece)
11 August 2015
18:00

Medyk Konin (Poland)	5–0	(Wales) Cardiff Met.
Sikora 8', 13', 45+1', 90+3'; Dudek 49'	Report

Stadion im. Złotej Jedenastki, Konin
Attendance: 400
Referee: Ana Minić (Serbia)

13 August 2015
15:30

Gintra Universitetas (Lithuania)	5–1	(Wales) Cardiff Met.
Elloh 8', 13'; N'Guessan 66'; Billingham 77' (o.g.); Akaffou 79'	Report	Murray 23'

Kleczew Stadium, Kleczew
Attendance: 300
Referee: Ivana Martinčić (Croatia)
13 August 2015
18:00

Wexford Youths (Republic of Ireland)	0–6	(Poland) Medyk Konin
	Report	Daleszczyk 5', 82'; Sikora 18'; Balcerzak 67', 84'; Tarczyńska 86'

Stadion im. Złotej Jedenastki, Konin
Attendance: 380
Referee: Ana Minić (Serbia)

16 August 2015
17:00

Medyk Konin (Poland)	4–0	(Lithuania) Gintra Universitetas
Sikora 31'; Daleszczyk 47'; Gawrońska 75'; Balcerzak 77'	Report

Stadion im. Złotej Jedenastki, Konin
Attendance: 450
Referee: Eleni Lampadariou (Greece)
16 August 2015
17:00

Cardiff Met. (Wales)	1–5	(Republic of Ireland) Wexford Youths
Allen 60'	Report	Breen 3', 6', 42', 80'; Cassin 30'

Kleczew Stadium, Kleczew
Attendance: 250
Referee: Ivana Martinčić (Croatia)

=== Group 8 ===
Pos	Team	Pld	W	D	L	GF	GA	GD	Pts	Qualification	VAN	KHA	RIG	NZK
1	(Finland) PK-35 Vantaa (H)	3	3	0	0	20	1	+19	9	Advanced to knockout phase	—	—	9–0	9–0
2	(Ukraine) Zhytlobud-1 Kharkiv	3	2	0	1	10	3	+7	6		1–2	—	4–1	—
3	(Latvia) Rīgas FS	3	1	0	2	4	15	−11	3		—	—	—	3–2
4	(Slovakia) Nové Zámky	3	0	0	3	2	17	−15	0		—	0–5	—	—

Source: UEFA
(H) Hosts
11 August 2015
13:30

Zhytlobud-1 Kharkiv (Ukraine)	4–1	(Latvia) Rīgas FS
Ovdiychuk 17'; Znaidenova 31'; Tykhonova 34'; Mozolska 45+1'	Report	Ročāne 58'

ISS Stadion, Vantaa
Attendance: 50
Referee: Lorraine Clark (Scotland)
11 August 2015
18:00

PK-35 Vantaa (Finland)	9–0	(Slovakia) Nové Zámky
Ojanperä 3', 35'; Franssi 9', 43'; Saarinen 18', 30'; Salmi 67'; Bačová 70' (o.g.); Parikka 89'	Report

ISS Stadion, Vantaa
Attendance: 511
Referee: Olga Zadinová (Czech Republic)

13 August 2015
13:30

Nové Zámky (Slovakia)	0–5	(Ukraine) Zhytlobud-1 Kharkiv
	Report	Ovdiychuk 1', 15', 64'; Kostyuchenko 12'; Nesterenko 70'

ISS Stadion, Vantaa
Attendance: 41
Referee: Lorraine Clark (Scotland)
13 August 2015
18:00

PK-35 Vantaa (Finland)	9–0	(Latvia) Rīgas FS
Saarinen 3', 14'; Painilainen 4', 75'; Parikka 58', 79'; Franssi 65'; Bröijer 67'; Kivelä 87'	Report

ISS Stadion, Vantaa
Attendance: 403
Referee: Vivian Peeters (Netherlands)

16 August 2015
14:00

Zhytlobud-1 Kharkiv (Ukraine)	1–2	(Finland) PK-35 Vantaa
Nesterenko 69'	Report	Ojanperä 24'; Saarinen 54' (pen.)

ISS Stadion, Vantaa
Attendance: 613
Referee: Olga Zadinová (Czech Republic)
16 August 2015
14:00

Rīgas FS (Latvia)	3–2	(Slovakia) Nové Zámky
Fedotova 31', 62'; Giržda 42'	Report	Koleničková 49', 88'

Sonera Stadium, Helsinki
Attendance: 10
Referee: Vivian Peeters (Netherlands)

== Statistics ==
There were 235 goals in 48 matches in the qualifying round, for an average of 4.90 goals per match.

=== Top goalscorers ===
Rank	Player	Team	Goals	Minutes played
1	(Nigeria) Ebere Orji	(Hungary) Ferencváros	9	202
2	(Netherlands) Jill Roord	(Netherlands) FC Twente	7	270
2	(Nigeria) Uchechi Sunday	(Belarus) FC Minsk	7	270
4	(Poland) Aleksandra Sikora	(Poland) Medyk Konin	6	270
5	(Finland) Sanna Saarinen	(Finland) PK-35 Vantaa	5	240
5	(Montenegro) Jasna Djoković	(Bosnia and Herzegovina) SFK 2000	5	270
5	(Brazil) Poliana	(Iceland) Stjarnan	5	270
8	(Romania) Alexandra Lunca	(Romania) Olimpia Cluj	4	133
8	(Serbia) Jelena Marenić	(Serbia) Spartak Subotica	4	145
8	(Republic of Ireland) Carol Breen	(Republic of Ireland) Wexford Youths	4	219
8	(Ukraine) Olha Ovdiychuk	(Ukraine) Zhytlobud-1 Kharkiv	4	246
8	(Serbia) Jelena Dimitrijević	(Greece) PAOK	4	260

Source: UEFA.com
