= 2011 Belarusian Women's Cup =

The 2011 Belarusian Women's Cup was the twentieth edition of the competition. It was won for the first time by FK Minsk after beating Viktoria Voronovo, Nadezhda Mogilev and, finally, defending champions Zorka Minsk.

== Results ==
=== Preliminary round ===
| Team 1 | Agg. | Team 2 | 1st leg | 2nd leg |
|---|---|---|---|---|
| Molodechno | 1–5 | Gomel | 0–0 | 1–5 |
| Viktoria Voronovo | 3–1 | Niva-Belcard | 2–0 | 1–1 |

=== Quarterfinals ===
| Team 1 | Agg. | Team 2 | 1st leg | 2nd leg |
|---|---|---|---|---|
| Viktoria Voronovo | 0–4 | Minsk | 0–0 | 0–4 |
| Gomel | 0–3 | Nadezhda Mogilev | 0–1 | 0–2 |
| Viktoria-86 Brest | 1–6 | Zorka Minsk | 0–4 | 1–2 |
| Universitet Vitebsk | 0–10 | Bobruichanka | 0–3 | 0–7 |

=== Semifinals ===
| Team 1 | Agg. | Team 2 | 1st leg | 2nd leg |
|---|---|---|---|---|
| Minsk | 3–1 | Nadezhda Mogilev | 1–1 | 2–0 |
| Zorka Minsk | 3–1 | Bobruichanka | 2–0 | 1–1 |

=== Final ===
18 June 2011
18:00 EEST

| Minsk | 1 – 0 | Zorka Minsk |
|---|---|---|
| Kenda 53' |

Olympic Stadium, Minsk
Attendance: 500
Referee: Dmitriev
