= Yulia Slesarchik =

Belarusian footballer

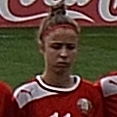
- Slesarchik in 2014.

Personal information
- Full name: Yulia Slesarchik
- Date of birth: 25 August 1994 (age 32)
- Place of birth: Zaslawye, Belarus
- Height: 1.67 m (5 ft 6 in)
- Position: Defender

Team information
- Current team: Dinamo Minsk

Senior career*
| Years | Team | Apps | (Gls) |
| 2010 | Molodechno | 21 | (0) |
| 2011–2015 | Zorka-BDU | 115 | (37) |
| 2016–2018 | FC Minsk | 51 | (22) |
| 2019 | Isloch-RGUOR | 20 | (5) |
| 2020 | Dinamo Minsk | 19 | (2) |
| 2021-2022 | Zenit | 27 | (0) |
| 2022- | Dinamo Minsk | 14 | (1) |

International career^{‡}
| 2010 | Belarus U17 | 3 | (0) |
| 2011–2012 | Belarus U19 | 6 | (0) |
| 2013– | Belarus | 26 | (4) |
- * Club domestic league appearances and goals as of 23:05, 3 May 2020 (UTC) ‡ National team caps and goals as of 00:55, 4 May 2020 (UTC)

Yulia Slesarchik (born 25 August 1994) is a Belarusian footballer who plays as a defender for Belarusian Premier League club Dinamo Minsk and the Belarus women's national team.

== Honours ==
Zorka-BDU

Winner

- Belarusian Women's Cup: 2012
- Belarusian Women's Super Cup: 2013

Runner-up

- Belarusian Premier League (2): 2014, 2015
- Belarusian Women's Cup (2): 2014, 2015
- Belarusian Women's Super Cup: 2015
