= Onome Ebi =

Nigerian footballer (born 1983)

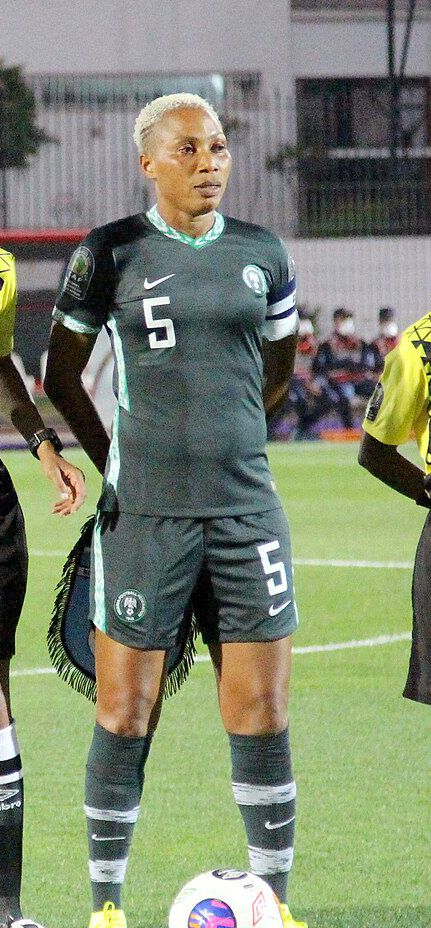
- Ebi in 2022

Personal information
- Date of birth: 8 May 1983 (age 43)
- Place of birth: Lagos, Nigeria
- Height: 1.75 m (5 ft 9 in)
- Position: Centre-back

Senior career*
Years	Team	Apps	(Gls)
2001–2008	Omidiran Babes		
2008	Bayelsa Queens		
2009	Piteå	6	(1)
2010	Djurgården	16	(0)
2010–2011	Düvenciler Lisesispor	7	(5)
2011–2013	Ataşehir Belediyespor	28	(21)
2013	Sunnanå SK	8	(0)
2014–2016	FC Minsk	37	(7)
2017–2020	Henan Jianye	0	(5)
2021	FC Minsk	19	(4)
2022	Levante Las Planas	1	(0)
2023–2025	Abia Angels		

International career^{‡}
2003–2025	Nigeria	109	(4)
- * Club domestic league appearances and goals as of 3 December 2022 ‡ National team caps and goals as of 10:30, 1 August 2023 (UTC)

Onome Ebi (born 8 May 1983) is a Nigerian former professional footballer who played as a centre-back for the Nigeria women's national team. In 2023, she became the first African footballer, male or female, to play in 6 FIFA World Cup tournaments.

== Club career ==
She played for Bayelsa Queens FC in the Nigerian Women's Championship before moving to Piteå IF and Djurgårdens IF in Sweden's Damallsvenskan. Ebi said "I enjoyed my stay in Turkey because of the good weather. Going to Sweden was a different ball game, as the cold weather made it difficult for me to play good football. The amateur nature of the Swedish league made me launch a return to Turkey for Ataşehir Belediyespor FC in the First League."

She then played for Turkish sides Düvenciler Lisesispor and Ataşehir Belediyespor at the First League. She made her Champions League debut in August 2012 while playing for Ataşehir Belediyespor.

Ebi returned to the Swedish Damallsvenskan in 2013 to play for Sunnanå SK before going to Belarus to play for FC Minsk in the Belarusian Premier League. While there, she was a member of the team that won the Belarusian Premier League, the Belarusian Women's Cup and the Belarusian Women's Super Cup twice.

In both club and international competitions, Ebi played as the number five in the team due to the significance it holds for her. When she arrived at Minsk, the jersey number was already taken, so she asked for the number 55 instead.

She later played for Chinese second division side Henan Jianye, where she signed in 2018.

Ebi made a significant move by joining Naija Ratels FC of Abuja for the upcoming 2023–24 Nigeria Women Football League (NWFL) season, set to kick off on November 15. The veteran footballer, with a remarkable history of six FIFA Women’s World Cups, was officially introduced at a vibrant ceremony in Abuja by the Naija Ratels management. Despite numerous offers from both local and international clubs following her participation in the 2023 FIFA Women’s World Cup, the 40-year-old defender expressed her joy in returning to the local league after more than a decade abroad. Ebi emphasized her deliberate choice of Naija Ratels, citing the club's youthful profile within the league, coupled with impressive organization and discipline.

== International career ==
Ebi is a former member of the Nigerian national team, making her debut in 2003. She currently holds the record for the most caps for Nigeria, making 109 appearances for the Super Falcons.

On 6 July 2019, she became the first African Footballer to play in five Fifa World Cup Tournaments, taking part in the 2003, 2007, 2011 and 2015, 2019 editions of the FIFA Women's World Cup and the 2008 Beijing Olympics.

Ebi was also a member of the Nigerian squad in the 2008, 2010, 2012, 2014, 2016 and 2018 editions of the African Women's Championship, winning the tournament four times 2010, 2014) 2016 and 2018.

On 16 June 2023, she was included in the 23-player Nigerian squad for the FIFA Women's World Cup 2023. By appearing as a substitute in Nigeria's 3–2 victory over Australia at 40 years and 50 days, she became the first African player, male or female, to play in six world cup tournaments.

In July 2025, she announced her retirement from professional football.

== International goals ==
No.	Date	Venue	Opponent	Score	Result	Competition
1.	15 September 2015	Stade Kintélé 3, Brazzaville, Congo	Cameroon	1–1	1−2	Football at the 2015 African Games – Women's tournament
2.	20 January 2019	Wuhua County Olympic Sports Centre, Meizhou, China	Romania	2–1	4–1	2019 Four Nations Tournament
3.	6 March 2019	Tasos Markos Stadium, Paralimni, Cyprus	Thailand	2–0	3–0	2019 Cyprus Women's Cup
4.	11 April 2023	Marden Sports Complex, Alanya, Turkey	New Zealand	1–0	3–0	Friendly

== Honours ==
Ataşehir Belediyespor

- Turkish Women's First Football League: 2011–12, 2012–13

FC Minsk

- Belarusian Premier League: 2014
- Belarusian Women's Cup: 2014
- Belarusian Women's Super Cup: 2014, 2015

Nigeria

- African Women's Championship: 2010, 2014, 2016, 2018

Individual

- NFF-Aiteo Female Player Of The Year: 2018
- IFFHS CAF Women's Team of the Decade: 2011–2020
- IFFHS All-time Africa Women's Dream Team: 2021
