= Ekaterina Avkhimovich =

Belarusian footballer

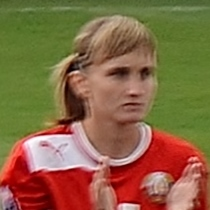
- Avkhimovich in 2014

Personal information
- Full name: Ekaterina Avkhimovich
- Date of birth: 2 January 1988 (age 38)
- Place of birth: Soviet Union
- Position: Striker

Team information
- Current team: Bobruichanka Bobruisk

Senior career*
Years	Team	Apps	(Gls)
2010–2011	Zorka Minsk	43	(44)
2011–2014	Ryazan	52	(7)
2015	FC Minsk	17	(5)
2016	Nadezhda Mogilev	12	(6)
2018-	Bobruichanka	9	(2)

International career
2009–	Belarus	12	(6)
- * Club domestic league appearances and goals as of 15 October 2016

Ekaterina Avkhimovich (born 2 January 1988) is a Belarusian football striker currently playing for Bobruichanka in the Belarusian Premier League. She previously played in the Russian Championship for Ryazan VDV and in the Belarusian Premier League for FC Minsk and Zorka-BDU Minsk, with both she also played the Champions League.

She is a member of the Belarusian national team.
