= 2014 Belarusian Premier League (women) =

Belarusian Premier League (women)
- Season: 2014
- Matches played: 84
- Goals scored: 419 (4.99 per match)
- Top goalscorer: Liana Mirashnichenka (25)

The 2014 Belarusian Premier League (women) was the 24th season of women's league football under the Football Federation of Belarus.

The league was won by FC Minsk, its second consecutive title. By winning, FC Minsk qualified to 2015–16 UEFA Women's Champions League.

With two clubs, Viktorya-86 Brest and FK Molodechno, withdrawing from the league, 7 club contested, playing 24 matches each.

== League table ==
Pos	Team	Pld	W	D	L	GF	GA	GD	Pts	Qualification
1	FC Minsk	24	22	1	1	121	11	+110	67	Qualification to Champions League
2	Zorka-BDU Minsk	24	16	3	5	104	20	+84	51	
3	Nadezhda Mogilev	24	14	4	6	78	25	+53	46	
4	Bobruichanka Bobruisk	24	13	2	9	52	35	+17	41	
5	Niva-BelCard Grodno	24	8	3	13	43	54	−11	27	
6	Universitet Vitebsk	24	2	1	21	8	153	−145	7	
7	Gomel SDJuShOR-8	24	2	0	22	13	121	−108	6	

== Top scorers ==
Rank	Scorer	Club	Goals
1	(Belarus) Liana Mirashnichenka	FC Minsk	25
2	(Belarus) Diana Tropnykova	Zorka-BDU Minsk	23
3	(Nigeria) Tawa Ishola	FC Minsk	18
4	(Belarus) Lyubov Gudchenko	Nadezhda Mogilev	16
4	(Nigeria) Ijeoma Obi	Bobruichanka Bobruisk	16
