= Ernestina Abambila =

Ghanaian footballer (born 1998)

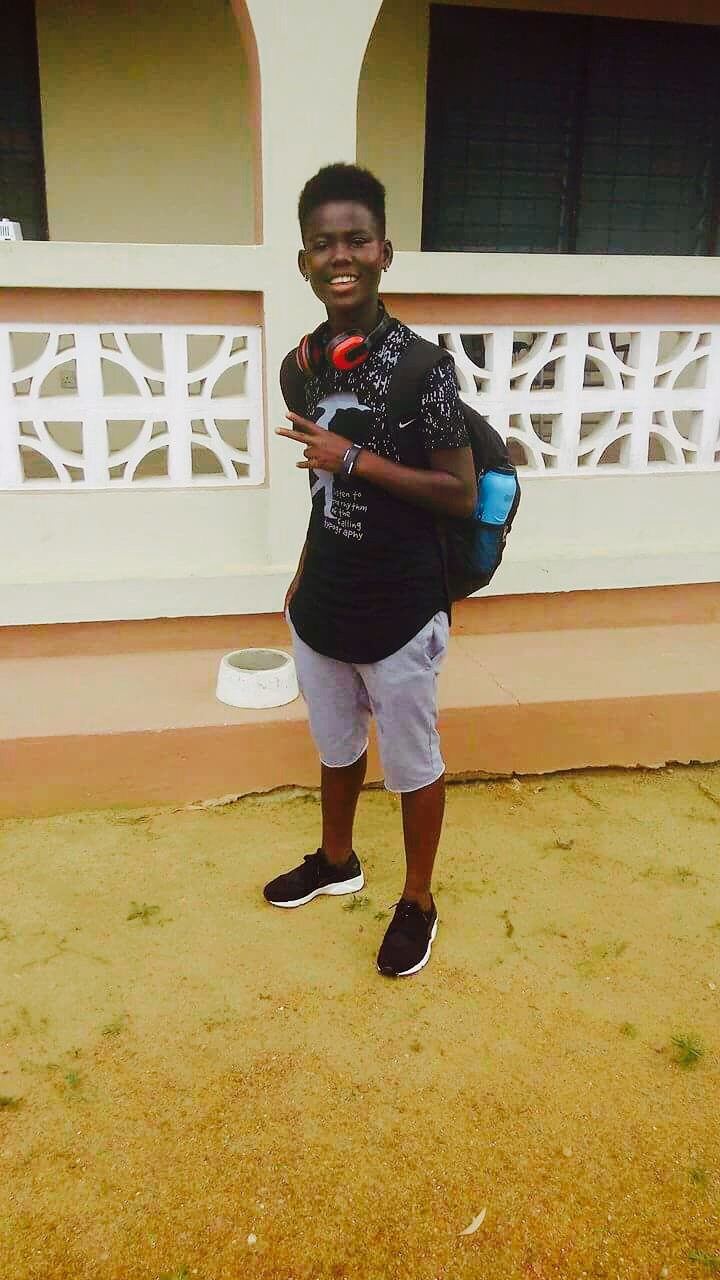

Personal information
- Date of birth: 30 December 1998 (age 27)
- Place of birth: Takoradi, Ghana
- Height: 1.65 m (5 ft 5 in)
- Position: Midfielder

Team information
- Current team: ETO FC Győr

College career
| Years | Team | Apps | (Gls) |
| 2014–2015 | Mississippi Valley State | 14 | (4) |
| 2016 | Youngstown State | 22 | (14) |

Senior career*
| Years | Team | Apps | (Gls) |
| 2017 | FC Minsk | 18 | (10) |
| 2018 | Aris | | |
| 2019 | Assi IF | 19 | (1) |
| 2020 | Sporting Club de Huelva | 4 | (0) |
| 2020–2021 | Medyk Konin | 21 | (3) |
| 2021–2023 | UKS SMS Łódź | 42 | (2) |
| 2023–2024 | Hakkarigücü | 29 | (2) |
| 2024– | ETO FC Győr | 1 | (0) |

International career
| 2014 | Ghana U17 | 11 | (2) |
| 2016–2018 | Ghana U20 | 10 | (3) |
| 2017– | Ghana | 2 | (0) |
- * Club domestic league appearances and goals as of 24 August 2024

Ernestina Abambila (born 30 December 1998) is a Ghanaian professional footballer who plays as an attacking midfielder and defensive midfielder for Női NB I club ETO FC Győr. Abambila is the first Ghanaian to score in the UEFA Women's Champions League. She made her senior international debut for the Ghana national team against France in 2017 at the age of 18.

== Club career ==
In 2016, Abambila signed a two-year contract with Youngstown State. Abambila began her professional career after finishing university. She signed for Belarusian Premier League (women) side FC Minsk. She became the first Ghanaian to score in the UEFA Women's Champions League when FC Minsk beat Ljubljana in the group stage of the 2017–18 UEFA Women's Champions League.

== International career ==
Abambila had her FIFA debut at the 2014 FIFA U-17 Women's World Cup hosted by Costa Rica in 2014. Her debut game was against North Korea that ended 2–0 to Ghana.

== Honours ==
FC Minsk

- Belarusian Premier League: 2017
- Belarusian Cup: 2017

UKS SMS Łódź

- Ekstraliga: 2021–22
- Polish Cup: 2022–23

== See also ==
- List of Ghana women's international footballers
