= Anastasia Linnik =

Belarusian footballer

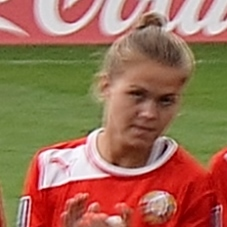
- Anastasia Linnik in 2014.

Personal information
- Full name: Anastasia Linnik
- Date of birth: 11 July 1993 (age 33)
- Place of birth: Minsk, Belarus
- Height: 1.70 m (5 ft 7 in)
- Position: Midfielder

Team information
- Current team: Lokomotiv Moscow
- Number: 99

Senior career*
| Years | Team | Apps | (Gls) |
| 2010–2016 | Zorka-BDU | 149 | (57) |
| 2017 | FC Minsk | 17 | (7) |
| 2018 | Isloch-RGUOR | 21 | (14) |
| 2019 | FC Minsk | 21 | (15) |
| 2020–2023 | Dinamo BGU | 62 | (50) |
| 2024 | Al Hilal | 6 | (3) |
| 2024– | Lokomotiv Moscow | 32 | (1) |

International career
| 2008-2010 | Belarus U17 | 5 | (0) |
| 2010–2011 | Belarus U19 | 8 | (0) |
| 2013– | Belarus | 58 | (4) |
- * Club domestic league appearances and goals

Anastasia Linnik (Belarusian: Анастасія Ігараўна Ліннік, also transliterated as Anastasija Iharaŭna Lińnik; born 11 July 1993) is a Belarusian football who plays as a midfielder for Russian Women's Football Championship club Lokomotiv Moscow and the Belarus women's national team.

== Club career ==
Anastasia was born in Minsk, Republic of Belarus.

=== Career in homeland ===
Anastasia Linnik was trained at the Motor Youth Sports School, with her first coach being Irina Bulygina.

She began her career at the Zorka-BDU club, where as part of the students team, she became an eight-time medalist of the Belarusian Championship, won the Belarus Cup three times, and the Belarus Super Cup twice.

In 2017, as a member of the FC Minsk team, she achieved a golden double by winning both the Belarus national championship and Belarus Cup.

In 2018, she represented RGUOR.

In 2019, she returned to FC Minsk, with which she once again won the Belarus championship title and Belarus Cup.

In 2020, she moved to the newly formed club Dynama-BDUFK, with which she also achieved a golden double. From 2020 to 2023, Linnik played for Dynama-BGUFK, with whom she annually won the Belarusian championship.

She spent her entire career until 2024 in the Belarus capital's teams.

=== Al-Hilal ===
In January 2024, it was announced that Linnik signed for Saudi Pro League club Al-Hilal. The term of the agreement is until the end of the Saudi Arabian Championship season, which ends in April 2024. During this time at the Saudi club, she played in 3 matches, in which she scored 3 goals and gave 2 assists. In the Saudi Arabian Championship, Al-Hilal finished in 5th place.

== International career ==
She plays for both the Belarus national football team and the Belarus national futsal team.

== International goals ==
| No. | Date | Venue | Opponent | Score | Result | Competition |
|---|---|---|---|---|---|---|
| 1. | 15 September 2016 | Dinamo Stadium, Minsk, Belarus | North Macedonia | 4–1 | 6–2 | UEFA Women's Euro 2017 qualifying |
| 2. | 22 September 2023 | Ménfői úti Stadion, Győr, Hungary | Bosnia and Herzegovina | 1–1 | 1–2 | 2023–24 UEFA Women's Nations League |
| 3. | 27 October 2023 | Szusza Ferenc Stadion, Budapest, Hungary | Slovenia | 1–1 | 1–1 | 2023–24 UEFA Women's Nations League |
| 4. | 30 May 2024 | Ararat Stadium, Tehran, Iran | Iran | 1–0 | 3–0 | Friendly |
| 5. | 1 July 2025 | Traktar Stadium, Minsk, Belarus | Azerbaijan | 1–0 | 2–0 | Friendly |

== Honours ==
Zorka-BDU

Winner

- Belarusian Women's Cup (2): 2010, 2012
- Belarusian Women's Super Cup (2): 2010, 2013

Runner-up

- Belarusian Premier League: 2014
- Belarusian Women's Cup: 2014
- Belarusian Women's Super Cup: 2015
