= Oksana Shpak =

Belarusian footballer (born 1982)

Personal information
- Full name: Oksana Vladimirovna Shpak
- Date of birth: 18 January 1982 (age 44)
- Place of birth: Belarus
- Position: Defender

Senior career*
Years	Team	Apps	(Gls)
- Bobruichanka
2003–2004	Medyk Konin		
2005	Lada		
2008	BIIK		
2009	Universitet		
2010–2011	Bobruichanka		
2012–2013	CSHVSM		
2014–?	Bobruichanka		

International career
- Belarus
- * Club domestic league appearances and goals

Oksana Vladimirovna Shpak (Russian: Оксана Шпак; born 18 January 1982) is a Belarusian former footballer who played as a defender.

== Early life ==
Shpak played basketball and handball as a child.

== Career ==
Shpak was awarded 2011 Belarusian women's league Player of the Year. She played for Belarusian side Bobruichanka, where she captained the club.

== Style of play ==
Shpak mainly operated as a central defender.

== Personal life ==
Shpak is a native of Bobruisk, Belarus.
