= Ekaterina Lutskevich =

Belarusian footballer

Personal information
- Date of birth: 11 August 1982 (age 44)
- Place of birth: Belarus,
- Position: Defender

Team information
- Current team: Bobruichanka

Senior career*
Years	Team	Apps	(Gls)
2004	Nika^{ru}		
2010-1012	Bobruichanka	71	(10)
2013-2014	FC Minsk	33	(4)
2015-2017	Zorka-BDU	48	(3)
2018	Isloch-RGUOR	12	(1)
2020-	Bobruichanka	38	(0)

International career^{‡}
2011-	Belarus	19	(0)
- * Club domestic league appearances and goals as of 01:55, 20 June 2020 (UTC) ‡ National team caps and goals as of 15:50, 11 May 2020 (UTC)

Ekaterina Lutskevich (born 11 August 1982) is a Belarusian footballer who plays as a defender and has appeared for the Belarus women's national team.

== Career ==
Lutskevich has been capped for the Belarus national team, appearing for the team during the 2019 FIFA Women's World Cup qualifying cycle.
