= Melana Surovtseva =

Belarusian footballer

Personal information
- Date of birth: 13 January 2003 (age 23)
- Place of birth: Belarus,
- Height: 1.64 m (5 ft 5 in)
- Position: Forward

Team information
- Current team: Tijuana
- Number: 9

Senior career*
Years	Team	Apps	(Gls)
2020	ABFF U19	20	(6)
2021–2026	Minsk	78	(109)
2026–	Tijuana	0	(0)

International career^{‡}
2018–2019	Belarus U17	12	(2)
2021	Belarus U19	3	(2)
2020–	Belarus	5	(0)
- * Club domestic league appearances and goals as of 10:00, 10 December 2023 (UTC). ‡ National team caps and goals as of 11 April 2021.

Melana Surovtseva (Belarusian: Мелана Сураўцава; born 13 January 2003) is a Belarusian footballer who plays as a forward for Belarusian Premier League club FC Minsk and the Belarus women's national team.

== Club career ==
Surovtseva has played for ABFF U19 and Minsk in Belarus.

== International career ==
Surovtseva capped for Belarus at senior level during the UEFA Women's Euro 2022 qualifying.

== International goals ==
No.	Date	Venue	Opponent	Score	Result	Competition
1.	14 July 2023	Borisov Arena, Barysaw, Belarus	Uzbekistan	4–1	4–1	Friendly
2.	30 May 2024	Ararat Stadium, Tehran, Iran	Iran	2–0	3–0	Friendly
3.	30 May 2024	Ararat Stadium, Tehran, Iran	Iran	3–0	3–0	Friendly
