= Anastasiya Kharlanova =

Belarusian footballer (born 1992)

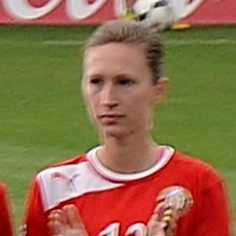
- Anastasiya Kharlanova on the football pitch.

Personal information
- Full name: Anastasiya Kharlanova
- Date of birth: 22 October 1992 (age 34)
- Place of birth: Gomel, Belarus
- Position: Forward

Team information
- Current team: FC Minsk
- Number: 13

Senior career*
Years	Team	Apps	(Gls)
2011–2012	Gomel	52	(19)
2013–2016	FC Minsk	67	(15)
2017–2018	Medyk Konin		
2018–2019	Isloch-RGUOR	27	(12)
2020–	FC Minsk	18	(4)

International career^{‡}
2012–	Belarus	22	(4)
- * Club domestic league appearances and goals as of 23:55, 13 July 2020 (UTC) ‡ National team caps and goals as of 22:40, 3 May 2020 (UTC)

Anastasiya Kharlanova (born 22 October 1992) is a Belarusian footballer who plays as a forward for FC Minsk in the Belarusian Premier League.

== Personal life ==
Born on 22 October 1992, Anastasiya Kharlanova is from Gomel, Belarus. As of late 2024 or early 2025, she is 32 years old. Her physical attributes are recorded as a height of 164 cm and a weight of 50 kg.

== Club Career Overview ==
Kharlanova's professional club career includes contributions to several teams.

She began her senior career with Gomel, playing for the club from 2011 to 2012. During this period, she appeared in 52 matches and scored 19 goals.

Her first tenure with FC Minsk spanned from 2013 to 2016. During these four seasons, she played 67 matches and scored 15 goals. Her involvement coincided with FC Minsk securing Belarusian Premier League titles in 2013 and 2014, along with the Belarusian Cup in both years, and the Belarusian Super Cup in 2014. She scored a goal for FC Minsk in the UEFA Women's Champions League during the 2014-15 qualifying round against Konak Belediyespor.

Following her initial spell in Belarus, Kharlanova joined Medyk Konin in Poland for the 2017–2018 season. With Medyk Konin, she won the Ekstraliga (the Polish top league) and the Polish Cup in the 2016–17 season. While specific appearance and goal statistics for this period are not consistently detailed across all available records, her presence during a period of domestic titles is noted.

She then returned to Belarus to play for Isloch-RGUOR from 2018 to 2019, where she made 27 appearances and scored 12 goals.

In 2020, Kharlanova rejoined FC Minsk for a second tenure. As of July 2020, she had accumulated 18 appearances and 4 goals in this period. She also contributed a goal for FC Minsk in the UEFA Women's Champions League during the 2020-21 qualifying round against Vllaznia. A photograph from April 2020 confirms her participation in a Belarusian Women's Vysheyshaya Liga match for FC Minsk.

Kharlanova played for FC Minsk in two distinct periods (2013-2016 and in 2020, based on available data). Her multiple tenures with FC Minsk coincided with the club's success in the Belarusian Premier League.

Senior Club Career Statistics
Years	Team	Apps	Gls
2011–2012	Gomel	52	19
2013–2016	FC Minsk	67	15
2017–2018	Medyk Konin		
2018–2019	Isloch-RGUOR	27	12
2020–2021	FC Minsk	20	4

== International goals ==
No.	Date	Venue	Opponent	Score	Result	Competition
1.	3 September 2019	Borisov Arena, Barysaw, Belarus	Faroe Islands	5–0	6–0	UEFA Women's Euro 2022 qualifying
2.	3 September 2019	Borisov Arena, Barysaw, Belarus	Faroe Islands	6–0	6–0	UEFA Women's Euro 2022 qualifying

== Honors ==
FC Minsk

- Belarusian Premier League: 2013, 2014
- Belarusian Cup: 2013, 2014
- Belarusian Super Cup: 2014

Medyk Konin

- Ekstraliga: 2016–17
- Polish Cup: 2016–17

=== Individual Milestones ===
- Achieved her "first international brace" and "first international goal" on 3 September 2019 during a UEFA Women's Euro 2022 qualifying match.
- Scored her "first team goal" for FC Minsk on 19 November 2020.
- Made her "debut for team" and "debut in category" in the UEFA Women's Champions League with FC Minsk on 4 November 2020.
