= Polina Shatsilenia =

Belarusian footballer

Personal information
- Date of birth: 16 June 1995 (age 31)
- Place of birth: Minsk, Belarus,
- Height: 1.66 m (5 ft 5 in)
- Position: Defender

Team information
- Current team: Bobruichanka

Senior career*
| Years | Team | Apps | (Gls) |
| 2010 | Victorya Voronovo | 22 | (0) |
| 2011–2015 | Zorka-BDU | 95 | (24) |
| 2016–2019 | FC Minsk | 63 | (18) |
| 2021 | Ryazan-VDV | 8 | (0) |
| 2022 | Zvezda Perm | 5 | (0) |
| 2022–present | Bobruichanka | 9 | (2) |

International career^{‡}
| | Belarus | 16 | (0) |
- * Club domestic league appearances and goals as of 01 May 2023 (UTC) ‡ National team caps and goals as of 19:27, 30 August 2019 (UTC)

Polina Shatsilenia (born 16 June 1995) is a Belarusian footballer who plays as a defender and has appeared for the Belarus women's national team.

== Career ==
Shatsilenia has been capped for the Belarus national team, appearing for the team during the 2019 FIFA Women's World Cup qualifying cycle.

== International goals ==
| No. | Date | Venue | Opponent | Score | Result | Competition |
|---|---|---|---|---|---|---|
| 1. | 11 April 2021 | AGMK Stadium, Olmaliq, Uzbekistan | Uzbekistan | 2–1 | 3–1 | Friendly |
