= Gift Otuwe =

Nigerian footballer

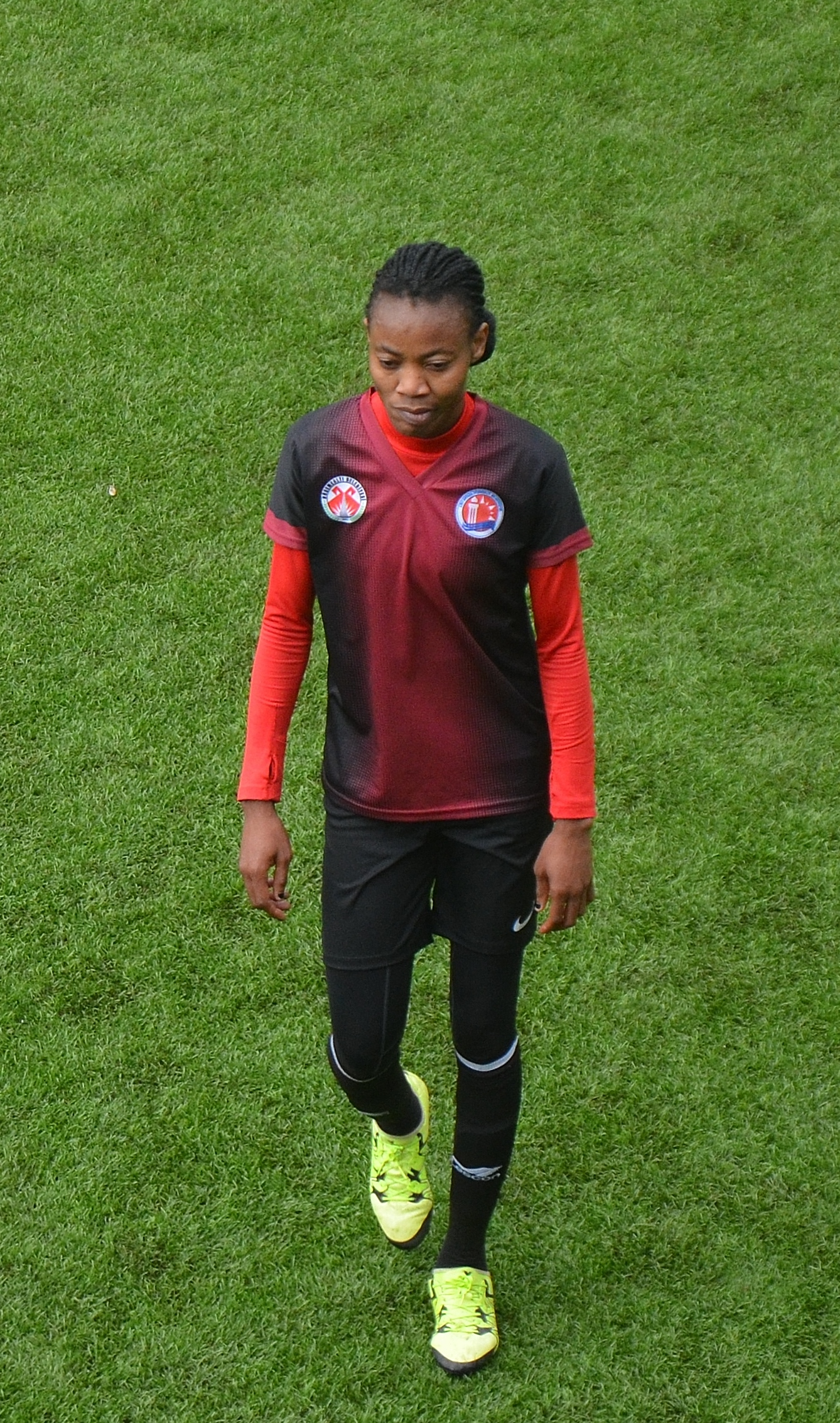
- Gift Otuwe (2016–17 season)

Personal information
- Full name: Gift Ele Otuwe
- Date of birth: 15 July 1984 (age 42)
- Place of birth: Nigeria
- Positions: Midfielder; striker

Team information
- Current team: Bobruichanka

Senior career*
Years	Team	Apps	(Gls)
- Bayelsa Queens FC
2012–2016	FC Minsk	97	(34)
2017	1207 Antalya Spor	10	(0)
2019-2020	Neman Grodno	28	(4)
2021	Bobruichanka	23	(13)

International career
- Nigeria
- * Club domestic league appearances and goals as of 4 June 2017

Gift Ele Otuwe (born 15 July 1984) is a Nigerian football midfielder. She plays for Bobruichanka in the Belarusian Premier League. She has been a member of the Nigerian national team, taking part in the 2004 Summer Olympics and the 2007 World Cup.

She played for FC Minsk in Belarus, capping 97 times and scoring 34 goals before moving to Turkey in March 2017.
