= Ijeoma Obi =

Nigerian footballer

Personal information
- Date of birth: 1 April 1985 (age 41)
- Position: Forward

Team information
- Current team: Delta Queens

Senior career*
Years	Team	Apps	(Gls)
- Sunshine Queens
- KMF Kuopio
- Minsk
- Bobruichanka
- Rivers Angels
- Delta Queens

International career
- Nigeria
- * Club domestic league appearances and goals

Ijeoma Obi (born 1 April 1985) is a Nigerian professional footballer who plays for Delta Queens in the Nigeria Women Premier League. She has represented Nigeria women's national football team at the African Women's Championship. She has been described as having great speed and technique to run over defenders.

== Club career ==
In January 2014, Obi signed for Bobruichanka Bobruisk in the Belarusian Premier League. She previously played for Minsk in the same league scoring more than 114 leagues goals in two seasons.

In May 2014, Obi dedicated the goals she scored to the abducted girls in Nigeria. Her team Bobruichanka defeated Niva-BelCard in the League.

In April 2017, Obi was in the starting lineup for Sunshine Queens when they were defeated by her former team, Rivers Angels at Yakubu Gowon Stadium. The result ensured Angels topped the group in the Nigeria Women Premier League.

== International career ==
Obi was part of the Nigerian squad for the 2004 African Women's Championship.

Obi was part of the Nigerian team that won the 2016 Africa Women Cup of Nations. At the 2016 AWCON, She was an unused substitute in the semifinal game against South Africa, Nigeria advanced to the final defeating South Africa by a lone goal.

== Personal life ==
Obi was born on 1 April 1985. In January 2017, Obi lost her brother, Okwuchukwu Obi in an accident. He was also a professional player for First Bank F.C.
