= Teya Penkova =

Bulgarian female footballer

Teya Penkova Тея Пенкова (Bulgarian)
Personal information
- Full name: Teya Plamenova Penkova
- Date of birth: 8 September 1999 (age 27)
- Place of birth: Burgas
- Position: Midfielder

Senior career*
Years	Team	Apps	(Gls)
- NSA Sofia

International career^{‡}
2014	Bulgaria U17	3	(0)
2016–2017	Bulgaria U19	6	(0)
2020–	Bulgaria	1	(0)
- * Club domestic league appearances and goals ‡ National team caps and goals as of 20 September 2020

Teya Plamenova Penkova (Bulgarian: Тея Пламенова Пенкова; born 8 September 1999) is a Bulgarian footballer who plays as a midfielder for the Bulgaria women's national team.

== International career ==
Penkova capped for Bulgaria at senior level in a 3–0 friendly win against Luxembourg on 20 September 2020.
