= Anna Pilipenko =

Belarusian footballer

Personal information
- Full name: Anna Pilipenko
- Date of birth: 25 December 1988 (age 37)
- Place of birth: Brest, Soviet Union (now Belarus)
- Height: 1.68 m (5 ft 6 in)
- Position: Midfielder

Team information
- Current team: Dinamo Minsk
- Number: 22

Senior career*
Years	Team	Apps	(Gls)
2010–2011	Viktorya-86 Brest	36	(23)
2011–2013	Ryazan VDV	32	(8)
2013–2014	Mordovochka	24	(1)
2015	Medyk Konin	1	(2)
2015–2018	FC Minsk	62	(60)
2019	Gintra Universitetas		
2020–	Dinamo Minsk	167	(133)

International career
2009–	Belarus	52	(17)
- * Club domestic league appearances and goals

Anna Pilipenko (born 25 December 1988) is a Belarusian footballer who plays as a midfielder for Premier League club Dinamo Minsk and the Belarus women's national team.

== International goals ==
No.	Date	Venue	Opponent	Score	Result	Competition
1.	25 October 2009	Gradski Stadion, Kumanovo, North Macedonia	North Macedonia	6–1	6–1	2011 FIFA Women's World Cup qualification
2.	26 October 2013	City Stadium, Molodechno, Belarus	Montenegro	1–0	3–1	2015 FIFA Women's World Cup qualification
3.	10 April 2014	Gradski stadion, Nikšić, Montenegro	Montenegro	1–1	7–1	2015 FIFA Women's World Cup qualification
4.	10 April 2014	Gradski stadion, Nikšić, Montenegro	Montenegro	3–1	7–1	2015 FIFA Women's World Cup qualification
5.	20 August 2014	Traktor Stadium, Minsk, Belarus	Ukraine	1–1	1–3	2015 FIFA Women's World Cup qualification
6.	8 April 2021	AGMK Stadium, Olmaliq, Uzbekistan	India	2–0	2–1	Friendly
7.	8 June 2021	Spartak Stadium, Mogilev, Belarus	Iran	2–0	6–0	Friendly
8.	8 June 2021	Spartak Stadium, Mogilev, Belarus	Iran	3–0	6–0	Friendly
9.	8 June 2021	Spartak Stadium, Mogilev, Belarus	Iran	5–0	6–0	Friendly
10.	17 September 2021	Dinamo Minsk, Minsk, Belarus	Cyprus	3–0	4–1	2023 FIFA Women's World Cup qualification
11.	26 November 2021	AEK Arena – Georgios Karapatakis, Larnaca, Cyprus	Cyprus	1–0	1–1	2023 FIFA Women's World Cup qualification
12.	14 July 2023	Borisov Arena, Barysaw, Belarus	Uzbekistan	2–1	4–1	Friendly
13.	14 July 2023	Borisov Arena, Barysaw, Belarus	Uzbekistan	3–1	4–1	Friendly
14.	22 February 2024	Tony Bezzina Stadium, Paola, Malta	Albania	2–0	3–0	Friendly
15.	22 February 2024	Tony Bezzina Stadium, Paola, Malta	Albania	3–0	3–0	Friendly
16.	9 April 2024	Dasaki Stadium, Dasaki Achnas, Cyprus	Georgia	2–0	3–0	UEFA Women's Euro 2025 qualifying
17.	2 June 2024	Ararat Stadium, Tehran, Iran	Iran	1–0	1–0	Friendly

== Honours ==
Medyk Konin

- Ekstraliga: 2014–15
- Polish Cup: 2014–15

== Career statistics ==
=== Club ===
Club	Season	Division	League		Cup		Continental		Total	
Club	Season	Division	Apps	Goals	Apps	Goals	Apps	Goals	Apps	Goals
Viktorya 86 Brest	2010	Belarus Women's Championship	23	16	4	8			27	24
Viktorya 86 Brest	2011	Belarus Women's Championship	13	7					13	7
Viktorya 86 Brest	Total		36	23	4	8			40	31
Ryazan	2011-12	Russian Women's Premier League	15	6					15	6
Ryazan	2012-13	Russian Women's Premier League	17	2					17	2
Ryazan	Total		32	8					32	8
Mordovochka	2013	Russian Women's Premier League	13	1					13	1
Mordovochka	2014	Russian Women's Premier League	11	0					11	0
Mordovochka	Total		24	1					24	1
Medyk Konin	2014-15	Ekstraklasa Kobiet	1	2					1	2
Minsk	2015	Belarus Women's Championship	8	11	3	1	5	2	16	14
Minsk	2016	Belarus Women's Championship	16	5	5	0	4	0	25	5
Minsk	2017	Belarus Women's Championship	18	14	6	4	5	4	29	22
Minsk	2018	Belarus Women's Championship	20	30	5	6	3	2	28	38
Minsk	Total		62	60	18	11	17	8	97	79
Gintra	2019-20	Romanian Women's League					3	0	3	0
Dinamo Minsk	2020	Belarus Women's Championship	18	14	5	3			23	17
Dinamo Minsk	2021	Belarus Women's Championship	27	25	3	1	2	0	32	26
Dinamo Minsk	2022	Belarus Women's Championship	25	21	4	5	2	2	31	28
Dinamo Minsk	2023	Belarus Women's Championship	26	25	4	3	2	2	32	30
Dinamo Minsk	2024	Belarus Women's Championship	26	18	4	1	2	1	32	20
Dinamo Minsk	2025	Belarus Women's Championship	26	19	1	1	4	1	31	21
Dinamo Minsk	2026	Belarus Women's Championship	19	11			2	2	21	13
Dinamo Minsk	Total		167	133	21	14	14	8	202	155
			322	227	44	33	34	16	400	276
