= Uchechi Sunday =

Nigerian footballer (born 1994)

Personal information
- Full name: Uchechi Lopez Sunday
- Date of birth: 9 September 1994 (age 32)
- Place of birth: Port Harcourt, Nigeria
- Height: 1.82 m (6 ft 0 in)
- Position: Striker

Youth career
- 2004–2008: Rivers Angels F.C.

Senior career*
Years	Team	Apps	(Gls)
2009–2010	Rivers Angels F.C.		
2011	FC Neunkirch		
2011–2015	Rivers Angels F.C.		
2015–2017	FC Minsk	7	(7)
2017–2018	Icheon Daekyo		
2018–2019	Meizhou Huijun		
2019–2021	FC Nordsjælland	3	(0)
2021	Nojima Stella Kanagawa		

International career^{‡}
2014	Nigeria U-20	6	(3)
2011–	Nigeria	4	
- * Club domestic league appearances and goals ‡ National team caps and goals as of 4 October 2021

Uchechi Lopez Sunday (born 9 September 1994) is a Nigerian professional footballer who plays as a striker. and is a member of the Nigeria women's national football team.

== Early years ==
Sunday was born in Port Harcourt, Nigeria on 9 September 1994 as the youngest of seven sisters.

== Career ==
=== Club ===
Sunday began her football career in 2004 with Rivers Angels F.C. in Nigeria. From 2009, she played in their professional team in the Nigerian Women's Premier League. On 14 April 2011, she signed with the Swiss club FC Neunkirch in Schaffhausen. She capped eight times in the Nationalliga B and scored 18 goals. In August the same year following the end of the 2010 FIFA U-20 Women's World Cup at Germany, she returned to her former club in Nigeria. At the beginning of 2015, Sunday joined the Belarusian team FC Minsk. She scored three goals in the first match with her new club. As end of May 2015, she had 14 goals netted in five matches only. She scored her 15th league goal in her 6th appearance on 20 June in the same season.

On 11 August 2015, she debuted in the UEFA Women's Champions League playing in the qualifying round match against Konak Belediyespor from Turkey. She scored five goals in the match, which ended 10–1 for FC Minsk. She netted one goal in the second, and two goals in the third match, totaling to eight goals in three matches of the qualifying round.

=== International ===
Playing for the Nigeria women's U-20 team, Sunday made her first appearance in a FIFA tournament at the 2010 U-20 World Cup in Germany, entering the Group C match-up against Mexico as a substitute. She also took part in the 2014 FIFA U-20 Women's World Cup in Canada, where she scored 3 goals in 6 matches. She scored three goals at the second round of the 2014 African U-20 Cup of Nations for Women.

She made her debut at the FIFA Women's World Cup and appeared in three matches of the 2011 FIFA Women's World Cup Group A for the Nigeria women's national football team.
