= Simona Veličkaitė =

Lithuanian footballer

Personal information
- Date of birth: 27 October 1996 (age 30)
- Position: Forward

International career^{‡}
Years	Team	Apps	(Gls)
	Lithuania	52	(3)
- ‡ National team caps and goals as of 28 March 2025 (UTC)

Simona Veličkaitė (born 27 October 1996) is a Lithuanian footballer who plays as a forward] and has appeared for the Lithuania women's national team.

== Career ==
Veličkaitė has been capped for the Lithuania national team, appearing for the team during the 2019 FIFA Women's World Cup qualifying cycle.
