= Dóra Papp =

Hungarian footballer

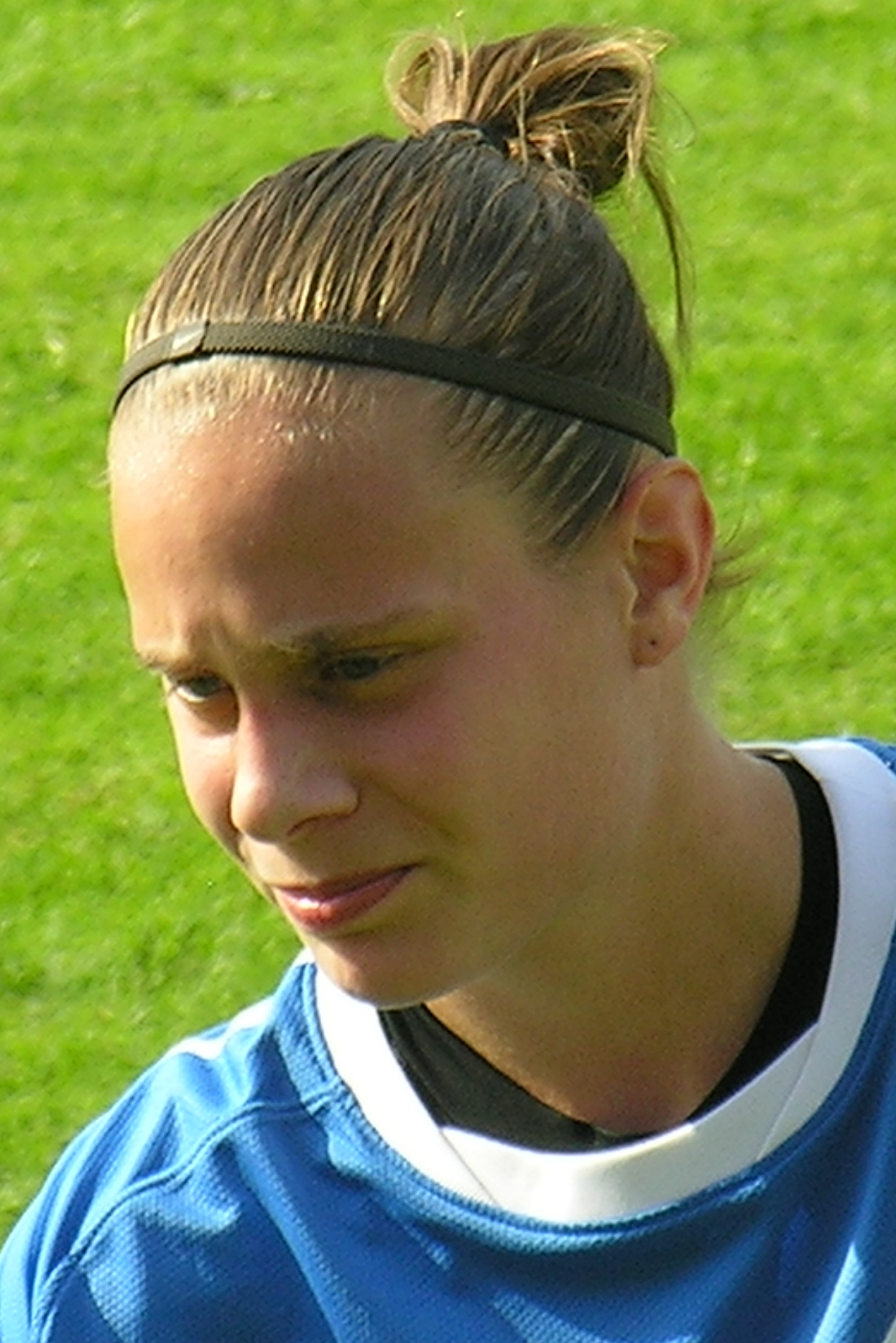

Personal information
- Full name: Dóra Papp
- Date of birth: 5 January 1991 (age 35)
- Place of birth: Szombathely, Hungary
- Position: Midfielder

Team information
- Current team: VV Alkmaar
- Number: 11

Senior career*
Years	Team	Apps	(Gls)
2006–2010	Viktória FC-Szombathely	86	(20)
2010–2021	MTK		(0)
2021-	VV Alkmaar	3	(0)

International career^{‡}
2010–	Hungary	59	(1)
- * Club domestic league appearances and goals ‡ National team caps and goals as of 10 March 2020

Dóra Papp (born 5 January 1991 in Szombathely) is a Hungarian football midfielder currently playing in the Eredivisie for VV Alkmaar. She is a member of the Hungarian national team.
