= Esther Sunday =

Nigerian footballer (born 1992)

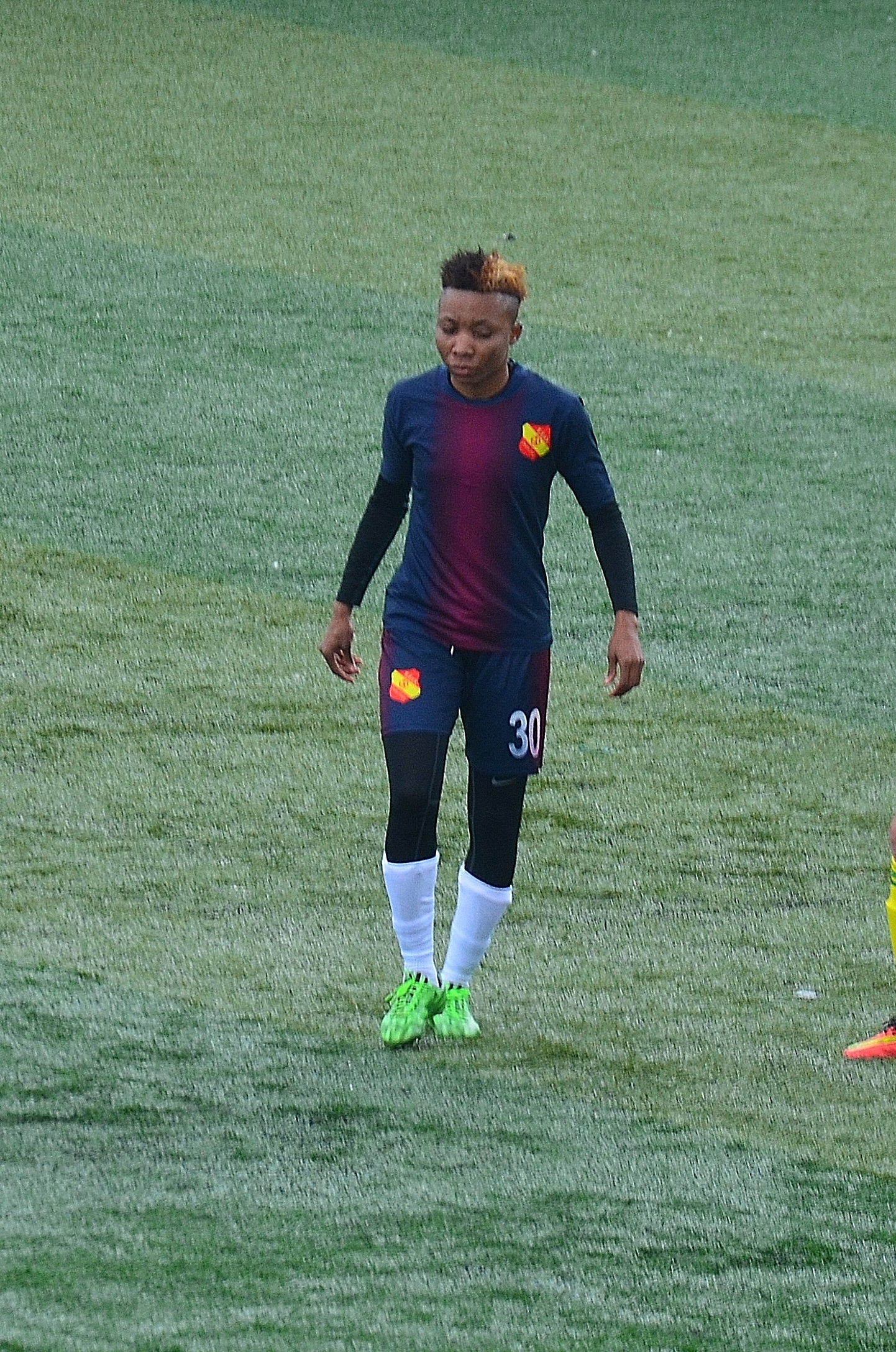
- Esther Sunday playing for Trabzon İdmanocağı in the 2016–17 Turkish Women's First Football League

Personal information
- Full name: Ukpong Esther Sunday
- Date of birth: 13 March 1992 (age 34)
- Place of birth: Lagos, Nigeria
- Height: 1.58 m (5 ft 2 in)
- Position: Left wing

Team information
- Current team: Khovd Western
- Number: 30

Senior career*
Years	Team	Apps	(Gls)
- Sunshine Queens
–2014	Pelican Stars		
2014–2015	FC Minsk	24	(27)
2016	Trabzon İdmanocağı	6	(8)
2016–2018	Konak Belediyespor	27	(20)
2018	Ataşehir Belediyespor	7	(4)
2019–2020	Konak Belediyespor	15	(4)
2020–2021	ALG Spor		
2021–2022	Dijon	10	(0)
2022–2023	OKS Stomil Olsztyn		
2023–2024	Rekord Bielsko-Biała	14	(9)
2024–2025	Sportowa Czwórka Radom		
2025–	Khovd Western		

International career
2010–	Nigeria	24	(5)
- * Club domestic league appearances and goals

Ukpong Esther Sunday (born 13 March 1992) is a Nigerian professional women footballer who plays for Women's National Football League club Khovd Western and the Nigeria national team.

== Playing career ==
=== Club ===
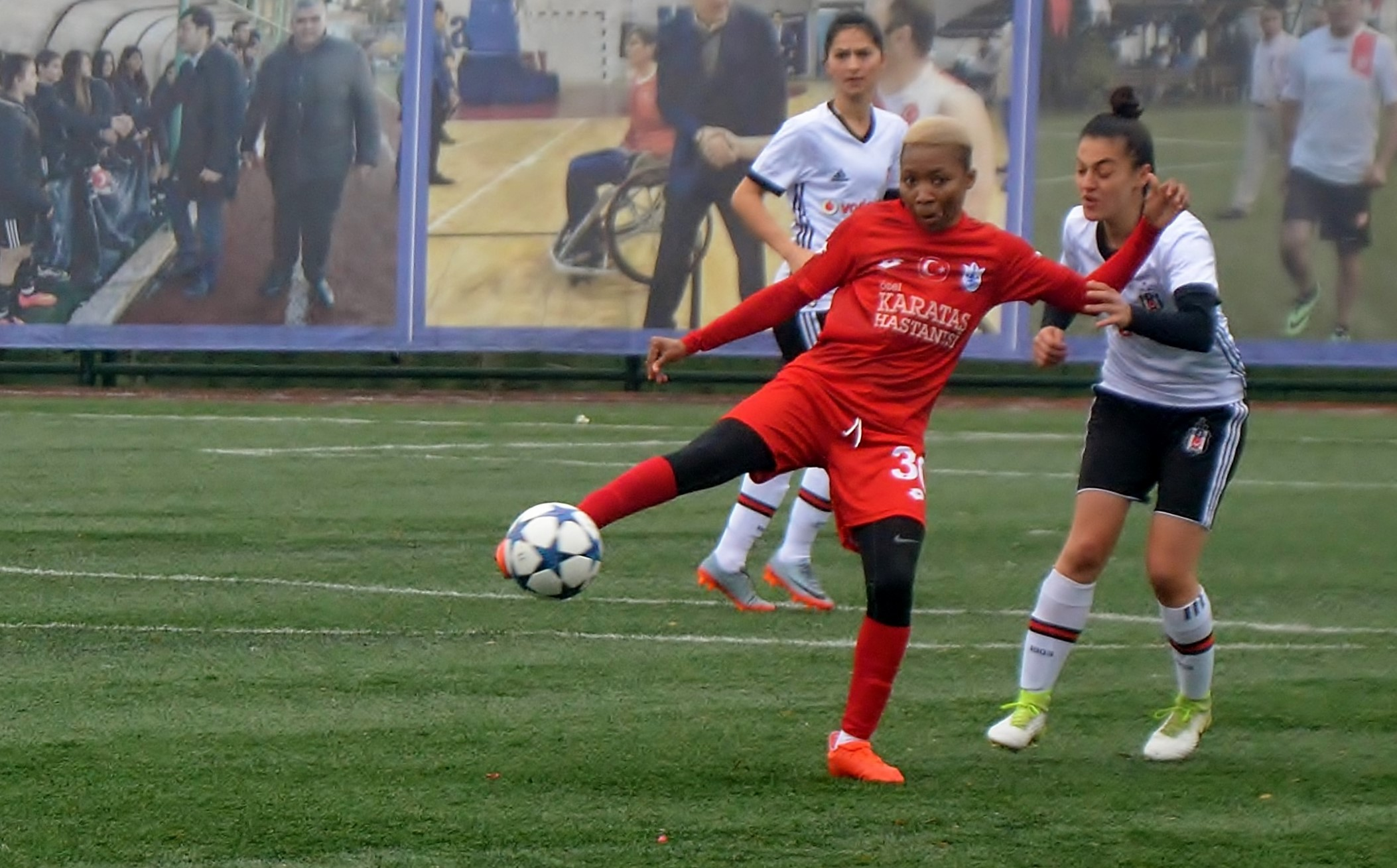
Esther Sunday (red) playing for Konak Belediyespor against Beşiktaş J.K. in the 2017–18 season's away match

Esther Sunday previously played for the Sunshine Queens and Pelican Stars, both in the Nigerian Women's Championship, before joining FC Minsk of the Belarusian Premier League. She was among three Nigerian internationals when the club won the Premier League, the Belarusian Women's Cup and the Belarusian Women's Super Cup.

In January 2016, she moved to Turkey joining Trabzon İdmanocağı. She appeared in the Turkish Cosmetics 2016 Tournament. In the beginning of the 2016–17 Women's First League's second half, she transferred to the İzmir-based club Konak Belediyespor. She debuted at the UEFA Women's Champions League and took part in three matches of the 2017–18 qualifying round. In July 2018, Sunday signed a one-year contract with Istanbul-based club Ataşehir Belediyespor, with participation at the 2018–19 UEFA Women's Champions League qualifying round. She played in all three matches and scored one goal. In the 2019–20 First League season, she returned to her former club Konak Belediyespor. By October 2020, she transferred to the Gazianyep-based club ALG Spor.

=== International ===
Sunday has represented Nigeria women's national football team at junior levels, being in the squad of the 2010 FIFA U-20 Women's World Cup and the 2012 FIFA U-20 Women's World Cup. At senior level she was part of the African Women's Championship tournaments in 2010, 2012 and 2014, winning it twice. She was also a member of the team which took part in the 2015 FIFA Women's World Cup, but did not progress past the group stage.

== Career statistics ==
As of 8 March 2020

Club	Season	League			Continental		National		Total	
Club	Season	Division	Apps	Goals	Apps	Goals	Apps	Goals	Apps	Goals
Trabzon İdmanocağı	2015–16	First League	6	8	–	–			6	8
Trabzon İdmanocağı	Total		6	8	–	–			6	8
Konak Belediyespor	2016–17	First League	16	13	–	–			16	13
Konak Belediyespor	2017–18	First League	11	7	3	0	0	0	14	7
Konak Belediyespor	Total		27	20	3	0	0	0	30	20
Ataşehir Belediyespor	2018–19	First League	7	4	3	1			10	5
Ataşehir Belediyespor	Total		7	4	3	1	0	0	10	5
Konak Belediyespor	2019–20	First League	15	4	–	–			15	4
Konak Belediyespor	Total		15	4	–	–	0	0	15	4

== Honours ==
=== Club ===
Belarusian Premier League

FC Minsk
Winners (1): 2014

Belarusian Women's Cup

FC Minsk
Winners (1): 2014

Belarusian Women's Super Cup

FC Minsk
Winners (1): 2015

Turkish Women's First League

Konak Belediyespor
Winners (1): 2016–17

=== International ===
African Women's Championship

Nigeria women's national football team
Winners (3): 2010, 2014, 2016
