= Tatyana Krasnova =

Belarusian footballer

Personal information
- Date of birth: 27 June 1995 (age 31)
- Place of birth: Belarus,
- Height: 1.48 m (4 ft 10 in)
- Position: Midfielder

Team information
- Current team: Rostov

Senior career*
Years	Team	Apps	(Gls)
2011–2014	Gomel	100	(44)
2015–2019	Bobruichanka	93	(75)
2020–2021	Ryazan-VDV	40	(5)
2022-	Rostov	48	(6)

International career^{‡}
2010–2011	Belarus U17	6	(3)
2011–2014	Belarus U19	12	(3)
2019–	Belarus	10	(0)
- * Club domestic league appearances and goals as of 3 November 2023 ‡ National team caps and goals as of 8 October 2023

Tatyana Krasnova (born 27 June 1995) is a Belarusian footballer who plays as a midfielder for Top Division club Rostov and the Belarus women's national team.
