= Dominika Koleničková =

Slovak footballer

Personal information
- Date of birth: 24 September 1992 (age 34)
- Place of birth: Slovakia
- Position: Midfielder

Team information
- Current team: Ślęza Wrocław
- Number: 17

Senior career*
Years	Team	Apps	(Gls)
2013–?	Nové Zámky		
–2020	Slovan Bratislava		
2020–2021	FC Saarbrücken	9	(1)
2021–2022	Medyk Konin	8	(0)
2022	Apollon Ladies	4	(2)
2025–	Ślęza Wrocław	21	(11)

International career^{‡}
2015–	Slovakia	11	(0)
- * Club domestic league appearances and goals as of 20:44, 2 June 2026 (UTC) ‡ National team caps and goals as of 11 March 2020

Dominika Koleničková (born 24 September 1992) is a Slovak professional footballer who plays as a midfielder for Polish club Ślęza Wrocław.
