= Yuliya Duben =

Belarusian footballer

Personal information
- Full name: Yuliya Duben
- Date of birth: 25 November 1996 (age 29)
- Place of birth: Belarus,
- Position: Forward

Team information
- Current team: Hatayspor
- Number: 96

Senior career*
| Years | Team | Apps | (Gls) |
| 2014–2020 | FC Minsk | 111 | (95) |
| 2020 | → Zorka-BDU (loan) | 7 | (3) |
| 2021 | Dinamo Minsk | 19 | (12) |
| 2022 | Hatayspor | 16 | (8) |
| 2022 | Kireçburnu Spor | 4 | (3) |

International career^{‡}
| 2017– | Belarus | 9 | (0) |
- * Club domestic league appearances and goals as of 6 November 2022 ‡ National team caps and goals as of 18:10, 1 March 2020 (UTC)

Yuliya Duben (born 25 November 1996) is a Belarusian footballer who plays as a forward and has appeared for the Belarus women's national team.

== Club career ==
In February 2022, Duben moved to Turkey, and signed with Hatayspor to play in the 2021-22 Turkish Women's Football Super League season. She scored eight goals in 16 matches. In the 2022–23 Super League season, she transferred to Kireçburnu Spor. She returned to her country in March 2023 after she netted three goals in four games.

== International career ==
Duben has been capped for the Belarus national team, appearing for the team during the 2019 FIFA Women's World Cup qualifying cycle.
