= Tatiana Markushevskaya =

Belarusian footballer

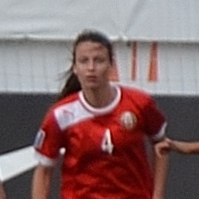
- Tatiana Markushevskaya, 2015 FIFA Women's World Cup qualification

Personal information
- Date of birth: 1 June 1994 (age 32)
- Place of birth: Minsk,
- Position: Midfielder

Team information
- Current team: Dinamo Minsk

Senior career*
Years	Team	Apps	(Gls)
2010	Victorya Voronovo	22	(1)
2011-2020	Zorka-BDU	175	(62)
2021-	Dinamo Minsk	8	(2)

International career^{‡}
2014-	Belarus	11	(0)
- * Club domestic league appearances and goals as of 19:27, 30 August 2019 (UTC) ‡ National team caps and goals as of 19:27, 30 August 2019 (UTC)

Tatiana Markushevskaya (born 1 June 1994) is a Belarusian footballer who plays as a midfielder and has appeared for the Belarus women's national team.

== Career ==
Markushevskaya has been capped for the Belarus national team, appearing for the team during the 2019 FIFA Women's World Cup qualifying cycle.
