= Maria Buzunova =

Belarusian footballer

Personal information
- Date of birth: 19 August 1982 (age 44)
- Position: Defender

Senior career*
Years	Team	Apps	(Gls)
–200?	Bobruichanka		
200?–20??	Gömrükçü Baku		
20??–2012	Bobruichanka	68+	(41+)
2013–2015	Minsk	55	(17)

International career^{‡}
	Belarus U18	5	(0)
2011–2013	Belarus	6	(1)
- * Club domestic league appearances and goals as of 30 August 2015 ‡ National team caps and goals as of 26 October 2013

Maria Buzunova (born 19 August 1982) is a Belarusian former footballer who has played as a defender. She has been a member of the Belarus women's national team.
