= Dragica Cepernić =

Croatian footballer

Personal information
- Full name: Dragica Cepernić
- Date of birth: 15 December 1981 (age 44)
- Position: Defender

Senior career*
Years	Team	Apps	(Gls)
- Osijek

International career
2004–2011	Croatia	10	(0)
- * Club domestic league appearances and goals

Dragica Cepernić is a Croatian football defender currently playing in the Croatian 1st Division for ŽNK Osijek, with whom she has also played the Champions League. She has been a member of the Croatian national team.
