= Ararat Stadium =

Football stadium in Tehran, Iran

Coordinates: 35°46′04″N 51°24′05″E

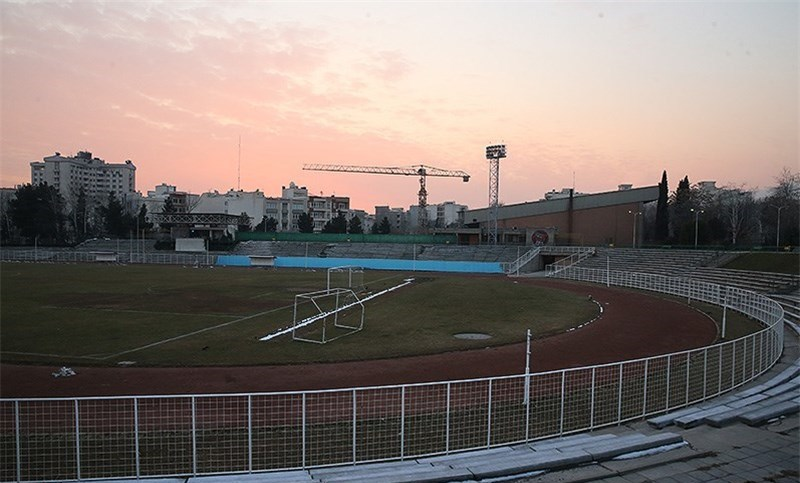
- Interactive map of Ararat Stadium
- Full name: Ararat Stadium
- Location: Vanak, Tehran, Iran
- Owner: Ararat Tehran
- Operator: Ararat Tehran
- Capacity: 15,000 seated
- Surface: Grass

Tenants
- Ararat Tehran; Iran women's national football team

Ararat Stadium (Armenian: Արարատ մարզադաշտ; Persian: ورزشگاه آرارات) is a football stadium with 10,000 seats built in 1971 and located in the Ararat Sports Complex in the Vanak neighbourhood of Tehran, Iran. It is named after Mount Ararat, the highest mountain of the Armenian Highlands in what is now Turkey. The complex is owned by the Armenian Cultural Ararat Organization founded in 1944, one of the largest associations of Iranian Armenians. The stadium is used by Ararat Tehran, who play in the Tehran Provincial League. It has also been used by the Iran women's national football team for their home matches.

== Location and architecture ==
The complex covers an area of 74,000 square meters in form of a triangle. The football stadium of FC Ararat Tehran with 10,000 seats was built in 1971. Near the stadium in the southeastern part of the complex, there is the Holy Cross Chapel (Surp Khatch), built in part in memory of the Iranian Armenian soldiers who lost their lives in the Iran–Iraq War.

The Ararat Sports Complex has also two swimming pools, indoor basketball courts, billiard tables, a rock climbing facility, badminton courts, tennis fields, and a sports museum.

== Cultural life ==
According to participants, the Sports Complex has its own distinct Armenian atmosphere, with signs appearing in Armenian script, Armenian coffee served, traditional Armenian music is played, and Persian is reportedly rarely spoken.

However, there are inter-ethnic activities, e.g. football matches, where general Islamic regulations have to be followed. In September 2016, the Pan-Armenian Games were held in the Ararat Complex of Tehran with about 800 Armenian athletes from Iran, Armenia and Georgia participating. At the opening ceremony, Ali Younesi, Hassan Rouhani’s Aide in Religious Minorities’ Affairs, was present.

== Famous athletes ==
The most important sports club playing in Ararat Stadium is FC Ararat Tehran, a football club that existed from 1944 to 2009 and was dissolved because it was bankrupt. However, it was refounded in 2014, and in 2015 it was playing in the Tehran Province league.

After the Islamic Revolution, it was Andranik Teymourian who started his career at Ararat Stadium, later played for the Bolton Wanderers F.C. in the English Premier League, then for Esteghlal F.C. and Tractor Sazi F.C. and in 2015 was appointed new captain of the Iran national football team.
