= Liana Mirashnichenka =

Belarusian footballer

Personal information
- Full name: Liana Mirashnichenka
- Date of birth: 15 December 1988 (age 37)
- Place of birth: Brest, Belarus,
- Height: 1.76 m (5 ft 9 in)
- Position: Midfielder

Team information
- Current team: FC Minsk
- Number: 6

Senior career*
Years	Team	Apps	(Gls)
2010–2011	Viktorya-86 Brest	35	(14)
2011–	FC Minsk	87	(57)

International career^{‡}
2013–	Belarus	6	(4)
- * Club domestic league appearances and goals as of 21:03, 3 April 2015 (UTC) ‡ National team caps and goals as of 21:03, 3 April 2015 (UTC)

Liana Mirashnichenka (born 15 December 1988) is a Belarusian football midfielder currently playing for FC Minsk.

== Honours ==
FC Minsk

Winner

- Belarusian Premier League (2): 2013, 2014
- Belarusian Women's Cup (2): 2013, 2014
- Belarusian Women's Super Cup: 2014

Runners-up

- Belarusian Premier League: 2012
- Belarusian Women's Cup: 2012
- Belarusian Women's Super Cup: 2012
