= Tawa Ishola =

Nigerian footballer

Personal information
- Date of birth: 23 December 1988 (age 37)
- Place of birth: Nigeria
- Position: Midfielder

Senior career*
Years	Team	Apps	(Gls)
2008	Bayelsa Queens		
2014–2015	FC Minsk	37	(23)

International career
2008	Nigeria	0 (?)	(0)
- * Club domestic league appearances and goals

Tawa Bowanle Ishola (born 23 December 1988) is a Nigerian football midfielder who played for the Nigeria women's national football team at the 2008 Summer Olympics.

== See also ==
- Nigeria at the 2008 Summer Olympics
