= Belarusian Premier League (women) =

Women's association football league

- Founded: 1992; 34 years ago
- Country: Belarus
- Confederation: UEFA
- Number of clubs: 11
- Level on pyramid: 1
- Domestic cup: Belarusian Women's Cup
- International cup: UEFA Champions League
- Current champions: Dinamo Minsk (6th title) (2025)
- Most championships: Babruichanka Babruisk (12 titles)
- Website: abff.by
- Current: 2026

The Belarusian Premier League is the top level women's football league of Belarus. The champion of the league qualifies for a spot in the UEFA Women's Champions League.

== Format ==
In 2009 teams in the league played each other twice. In the 2010 season the teams play each other three times.

In 2008 there were two playoff groups after the regular season. Teams 1 to 4 and 5 to 8 played a double round robin (so 6 additional matches).

== Teams ==
The 2023 season is made up by the following teams.

Locations of teams in the 2021 Belarusian Premier League

Team	Location	Ground
ABFF WU-19	Minsk	Stadion FK Minsk
Bobruichanka	Bobruisk	Stadyen Spartak
Dynamo-Brest	Brest	COR Brjestkoj Oblasti
DUSH PolesGU	Pinsk, Pinsk Region	Volna
Dinamo-BSUPC	Minsk	Stadyen Dynama-Juni
Dnepr-Mogilev	Mogilev	Stadion SDYuShOR-7
Gomel	Gomel	Stadyen Central'ny
FC Minsk	Minsk	Stadion FK Minsk
Smorgon	Smarhonʹ	Yunost Stadium
Vitebsk	Vitebsk	CSC «Vitebski»
Zorka-BSU	Minsk	Stadyen RTsOP-BGU

== List of champions ==
A list of all champions.

- 1992 Nadezhda Mahilyou
- 1993 Nadezhda Mahilyou
- 1994 Trikotazhnitsa Babruisk
- 1995 Viktoriya Brest
- 1996 Belkar Babruisk
- 1997 Babruichanka Babruisk
- 1998 Babruichanka Babruisk
- 1999 Babruichanka Babruisk
- 2000 Babruichanka Babruisk
- 2001 Babruichanka Babruisk
- 2002 Babruichanka Babruisk
- 2003 Babruichanka Babruisk
- 2004 Babruichanka Babruisk
- 2005 Universitet Vitebsk
- 2006 Universitet Vitebsk
- 2007 Universitet Vitebsk
- 2008 Universitet Vitebsk
- 2009 Universitet Vitebsk
- 2010 Babruichanka Babruisk
- 2011 Babruichanka Babruisk
- 2012 Babruichanka Babruisk
- 2013 FC Minsk
- 2014 FC Minsk
- 2015 FC Minsk
- 2016 FC Minsk
- 2017 FC Minsk
- 2018 FC Minsk
- 2019 FC Minsk
- 2020 Dinamo Minsk
- 2021 Dinamo Minsk
- 2022 Dinamo Minsk
- 2023 Dinamo Minsk
- 2024 Dinamo Minsk
- 2025 Dinamo Minsk

== Record Champions ==
Titles	Team
12	Babruichanka Babruisk
7	FC Minsk
6	Dinamo Minsk
5	Universitet Vitebsk
2	Nadezhda Mahilyou
1	Trikotazhnitsa Babruisk; Viktoriya Brest

== Top goalscorers ==
Season	Player	Team	Goals
1993	(Belarus) Natalia Rizhevich	Bobruichanka	16
2004	(Belarus) Aksana Znaidzionava	Dnepr Mogilev	14
2008	(Belarus) Marina Lis	Zorka	19
2010	(Belarus) Ekaterina Avkhimovich	Zorka	32
2011	(Belarus) Diana Tropnikova	Zorka	28
2012	(Nigeria) Ijeoma Obi	Minsk	74
2013	(Nigeria) Ijeoma Obi	Minsk	34
2014	(Belarus) Liana Mirashnichenka	Minsk	25
2015	(Nigeria) Esther Sunday	Minsk	25
2016	(Belarus) Tatyana Krasnova	Bobruichanka	17
2017	(Ukraine) Tamila Khimich	Minsk	24
2018	(Belarus) Karina Olkhovik	Islouch-RGUOR	42
2019	(Belarus) Ekaterina Dudko	Neman	35
2020	(Burkina Faso) Salimata Simporé	Dinamo-BGU	19
2021	(Belarus) Melana Surovtseva	Minsk	34
2022	(Belarus) Anastasiya Pobegaylo	Minsk	35
2023	(Belarus) Melana Surovtseva	Minsk	59
2024	(Russia) Ekaterina Frolova	Zorka-BDU Minsk	41
2025	(Belarus) Viktorya Valyuk	Minsk	35

Most goals by a player in a single season

- 74 goals.
  - (Nigeria) Ijeoma Obi (2012).

=== All-time goalscorers ===
Rank	Player	Goals	Years
1	(Belarus) Diana Tropnikova	221	2010-
2	(Belarus) Anna Pilipenko	216	2010
