= Universitet Vitebsk =

- Full name: WFC Universitet Vitebsk
- Founded: 1995
- Ground: Stadyen Central'ny Vitsyebski
- Capacity: 8144
- League: Belarusian Premier League
- 2009: 1st
Home colours	Away colours

Universitet Vitebsk is a Belarusian women's football club from Vitebsk (Vitsyebsk). The holder of the club is, like the name suggests, the local university. The club is most known for its women's team, that won the Belarusian Premier League several times.

== History ==
The club was founded in 1995. In a span of 8 years the women's team worked its way up into the Belarusian Premier League, where it won the title instantly and ended the year-long dominance of Babruichanka Babruisk. In 2006–07 and 2007–08 the team reached the 2nd qualifying round of the UEFA Women's Cup.

In the 2009–10 UEFA Women's Champions League one started in the round of 32 but lost to FCR Duisburg.

== Titles ==
- Belarusian women's championships: 2004, 2005, 2008, 2009
- Belarusian Women's Cup winners: 2005, 2006, 2007

== Current squad ==
As of 8 October 2011
Note: Flags indicate national team as defined under FIFA eligibility rules; some limited exceptions apply. Players may hold more than one non-FIFA nationality.

No.	Pos.	Nation	Player
—	GK	BLR	Olga Litvin
—	DF	BLR	Alina Brovko
—	DF	BLR	Oksana Klykovskaya
—	DF	BLR	Alexandra Kudryavtseva
—	DF	BLR	Yulia Kudryavtseva
—	DF	BLR	Anna Potavkina
—	DF	BLR	Anastasya Solokho
—	DF	BLR	Yulia Vasilenko
—	DF	BLR	Natalya Vereneva
—	DF	BLR	OIlga Volkova
—	DF	BLR	Maria Zemerova

No.	Pos.	Nation	Player
—	MF	BLR	Violetta Chayko
—	MF	BLR	Maria Chernyaeva
—	MF	BLR	Natalya Lunina
—	MF	BLR	Anastasya Lusinskaya
—	MF	BLR	Kristina Prushakova
—	MF	BLR	Valerya Solokho
—	MF	BLR	Violetta Vlasova
—	FW	BLR	Ekaterina Kirshenovich
—	FW	BLR	Kristina Stepanova
—	FW	BLR	Alexandra Yakushevich
