= FC Minsk (women) =

ZFK Minsk
- Full name: Women Football Club Minsk
- Ground: FC Minsk Stadium; Minsk, Belarus
- Capacity: 2,000
- Chairman: Andrey Vasilevich
- Manager: Andrey Pyshnik
- League: Belarusian Premier League
- 2025: 2nd
Home colours	Away colours

ZFK Minsk is a Belarusian professional women's football club based in Minsk. It plays its home matches at the FC Minsk Stadium.

== History ==
It originally competed in the Belarusian Premier League as Minchanka-BGPU before becoming the women's section of FC Minsk in 2010. In 2011, it won the national cup, its first title, and soon afterwards it rose to the championship's top positions.

In 2013, it won the championship for the first time, winning all 26 games, along with its second Cup. This qualified the team for UEFA Women's Champions League for the first time.

In 2014, the club succeeded in achieving the double again.

== Honours ==
- Belarusian Premier League:
  - Winners (7): 2013, 2014, 2015, 2016, 2017, 2018, 2019
- Belarusian Women's Cup:
  - Winners (8): 2011, 2013, 2014, 2015, 2016, 2017, 2018, 2019,
- Belarusian Women's Super Cup:
  - Winners (7): 2014, 2015, 2016, 2018, 2019, 2020, 2024

== Players ==
As of 1 July 2026

Note: Flags indicate national team as defined under FIFA eligibility rules; some limited exceptions apply. Players may hold more than one non-FIFA nationality.

No.	Pos.	Nation	Player
2	MF	BLR	Ulyana Asaula
3	DF	BLR	Antonia Mikheenko
4	DF	RUS	Ilona Vlasenko
5	MF	BLR	Yana Esman
6	MF	BLR	Liana Miroshnichenko
7	MF	RUS	Yana Khotyreva
8	FW	BLR	Diana Katsynel
9	FW	BLR	Daria Protasyuk
10	MF	BLR	Elizaveta Pinchuk
11	MF	RUS	Marina Kiskonen
14	DF	KAZ	Maria Demidova
15	DF	BLR	Anastasia Belenkaya
16	MF	BLR	Elizaveta Iskareva

No.	Pos.	Nation	Player
17	FW	BLR	Ekaterina Dudko
19	FW	BLR	Alexandra Samoilova
20	MF	BLR	Victoria Kazakevich
21	MF	BLR	Valeria Bogdan
25	MF	BLR	Victoria Natetkova
33	GK	BLR	Palina Aiduchyk
41	MF	BLR	Daria Markova
44	MF	BLR	Lada Pashkovskaya
65	GK	BLR	Valeryia Viarzhbitskaya
75	MF	BLR	Valeria Belaya
77	MF	BLR	Ulyana Uzun
88	MF	BLR	Miroslava Zubko
91	GK	RUS	Ekaterina Miklashevich

=== Former players ===
For details of current and former players, see Category:FC Minsk (women) players.

== UEFA Women's Champions League record ==
Season	Stage	Opponents	Results	Scorers
2014–15	Qualifying round	(Switzerland) FC Zürich	1–1	E. Sunday
2014–15	Qualifying round	(Turkey) Konak Belediyespor	1–2	Kharlanova
2014–15	Qualifying round	(Latvia) Rigas FS	7–0	Buzunova (2), Ishola, Kenda, Miroshnichenko, Otuwe, E. Sunday
2015–16	Qualifying round	(Turkey) Konak Belediyespor	10–1	E. Sunday, Miroshnichenko (2), U. Sunday (5), Özgan (o.g.), Ishola
2015–16	Qualifying round	(Bosnia and Herzegovina) SFK Sarajevo	3–0	Pilipenko, U. Sunday, Buzunova
2015–16	Qualifying round	(Albania) Vllaznia Shkodër	3–0	U. Sunday (2), Pilipenko
2015–16	Round of 32	(Denmark) Fortuna Hjørring	0–2 (H), 0–4 (A)	
2016–17	Qualifying round	(Belgium) Standard Liège	3–1	Ebi, Slesarchik, Duben
2016–17	Qualifying round	(Croatia) ŽNK Osijek	5–0	Ogbiagbevha (3), Duben (2)
2016–17	Qualifying round	(North Macedonia) ŽFK Dragon	9–0	Yakubu (5), Ogbiagbevha, Otuwe, Lynko, Ebi
2016–17	Round of 32	(Spain) FC Barcelona	0–3 (H), 1–2 (A)	Ogbiagbevha
2017–18	Qualifying round	(Malta) Birkirkara	8–0	Pilipenko (3), Linnik, Khimich (2), Duben, Miroshnichenko
2017–18	Qualifying round	(Slovenia) ŽNK Olimpija Ljubljana	5–0	Borisenko, Pilipenko, Abambila, Khimich (2)
2017–18	Qualifying round	(Switzerland) FC Zürich	0–0	
2017–18	Round of 32	(Czech Republic) Slavia Praha	1–3 (H), 3–4 (A)	Khimich (2), Duben, Ogbiagbevha
2018–19	Qualifying round	(Slovenia) ŽNK Olimpija Ljubljana	6–0	Pilipenko (2), Ogbiagbevha (2), Shmatko, Diakité
2018–19	Qualifying round	(Slovakia) Slovan Bratislava	1–0	Pribilová (o.g.)
2018–19	Qualifying round	(Cyprus) Barcelona FA	0–2	
2019–20	Qualifying round	(Luxembourg) Bettembourg	12–0	Ogbiagbevha (4), Cissé, Shuppo (2), Khimich (3), Aniset (o.g.), Madiba
2019–20	Qualifying round	(Croatia) ŽNK Split	2–1	Khimich, Ogbiagbevha
2019–20	Qualifying round	(Ukraine) Zhytlobud-1 Kharkiv	2–0	Ogbiagbevha, Linnik
2019–20	Round of 32	(Switzerland) FC Zürich	1–0 (H), 3–1 (A)	Ogbiagbevha (3), Duben
2019–20	Round of 16	(Spain) FC Barcelona	0–5 (A), 1–3 (H)	Ogbiagbevha
2020–21	First qualifying round	(Latvia) Rīgas FS	3–0	Kubichnaya, Shmatko, Akaba
2020–21	Second qualifying round	(Albania) Vllaznia	2–0	Sas, Kharlanova
2020–21	Round of 32	(Norway) LSK Kvinner	0–2 (H), 1–0 (A)	Skorynina
2021–22	First qualifying round	(Norway) Rosenborg	1–2	Kuč
2021–22	First qualifying round	(Scotland) Celtic	3–2 (a.e.t.)	Kapetanovic, Kuč
2022–23	First qualifying round	(Slovakia) Slovácko	2–1	Pobegaylo, Surovtseva
2022–23	First qualifying round	(Norway) Rosenborg	0–1	
2023–24	First qualifying round	(Norway) Vålerenga	1–3	Kiskonen
2023–24	First qualifying round	(Denmark) Brøndby	1–2	Mashina
2024–25	First qualifying round	(Iceland) Breiðablik	1–6	Miroshnichenko
2024–25	First qualifying round	(Germany) Eintracht Frankfurt	0–6	
