= Belarusian Women's Cup =

Кубок Беларуси Женщины
- Founded: 1992
- Region: Belarus
- Current champions: Dinamo-BGU FK
- Most championships: Bobruichanka Bobruisk (10 titles)

The Belarusian Women's Cup (Belarusian: Кубка Беларуси) is the annual cup competition of women's football teams in Belarus. It was first contested in 1992.

== List of finals ==
The list of finals:

Season	Champion	Result	Runner-up
1992	Nadezhda Mahilyou	5–0	Elektronika (Minsk)
1993	Nadezhda Mahilyou	1–0	Trikotazhnitsa-Ornina Bobruisk
1994	Nadezhda Mahilyou	2–0	Trikotazhnitsa-Ornina Bobruisk
1995	Trikotazhnitsa-Ornina Bobruisk	2–1	Nadezhda Mahilyou
1996	Belcar Bobruisk		
1997	Bobruichanka Bobruisk		
1998	Bobruichanka Bobruisk		
1999	Bobruichanka Bobruisk		
2000	Bobruichanka Bobruisk		
2001	Bobruichanka Bobruisk		
2002	Bobruichanka Bobruisk		
2003	Bobruichanka Bobruisk		
2004	Nadezhda-Liftmash Mahilyou		
2005	"University-Dvina" (Vitebsk)		
2006	Universitet Vitebsk		
2007	Universitet Vitebsk		
2008	Bobruichanka Bobruisk		
2009	Zorka-BDU (Minsk)		
2010	Zorka-BDU	0–0 (a.e.t.) (4–2 p)	Bobruichanka Bobruisk
2011	Minsk	1–0	Zorka-BDU
2012	Zorka-BDU	2–1 (a.e.t.)	Minsk
2013	Minsk	3–0	Bobruichanka Bobruisk
2014	Minsk	2–1	Zorka-BDU
2015	Minsk	2–1	Zorka-BDU
2016	Minsk	3–0 a.e.t.	Zorka-BDU
2017	Minsk	1–0	Zorka-BDU
2018	Minsk	6–1	RGUOR
2019	Minsk	4–0	Isloch-RGUOR
2020	Dinamo-BSUFC	0–0 (a.e.t.) (5–4 p)	Minsk
2021	Dinamo-BSUFC	5–0	WFC Minsk
2022	Dinamo-BSUFC	0–0 (a.e.t.) (5–4 p)	WFC Minsk
2023	Dinamo-BSUFC	3–2	WFC Minsk
2024	?	?	?
2025	Dinamo-BGU	2–1	FC Minsk
