= Bobruichanka Bobruisk =

- Full name: Bobruichanka Bobruisk
- Ground: Spartak Stadium, Bobruisk
- Capacity: 3661
- Manager: Nikolay Kasatkin
- League: Belarusian Premier League
- 2021: 6th
Home colours	Away colours

Bobruichanka Bobruisk is a Belarusian women's football club from Bobruisk. The club is one of the most successful women's team in Belarus, as it won the Belarusian Premier League several times.

== History ==
The team has won eight championships in a row from 1997 to 2004. After that Universitet Vitebsk and Zorka-BDU shared 5 titles. In 2010 Bobruichanka again won the league and thus qualified for the 2011–12 UEFA Women's Champions League.

=== Historical names ===
- 1991–92 – Trikotazhnitsa
- 1993–95 – Trikotazhnitsa-Ornina
- 1996 – Belcar
- Since 1997 – Bobruichanka

=== First Team squad ===
As of 1 May 2023.

Note: Flags indicate national team as defined under FIFA eligibility rules; some limited exceptions apply. Players may hold more than one non-FIFA nationality.

No.	Pos.	Nation	Player
—	GK	(Belarus) BLR	Anna Bondarenko I
—	DF	(Belarus) BLR	Oksana Shpak
—	DF	(Belarus) BLR	Polina Shatilenya
—	MF	(Belarus) BLR	Svetlana Pekhota
—	DF	(Belarus) BLR	Ekaterina Lutskevich
—	FW	(Belarus) BLR	Tatiana Loginova
—	MF	(Belarus) BLR	Polina Tsybulskaya
—	FW	(Belarus) BLR	Karina Beresneva
—	MF	(Belarus) BLR	Anna Bondarenko II
—	MF	(Belarus) BLR	Valeria Kuntsevich
—	FW	(Belarus) BLR	Ksenia Pokhlestova

No.	Pos.	Nation	Player
—	MF	(Belarus) BLR	Zoya Gorbunova
—	FW	(Belarus) BLR	Viletta Belochub
—	DF	(Belarus) BLR	Ekaterina Kuchinskaya
—	FW	(Belarus) BLR	Olga Aniskovtseva
—	MF	(Belarus) BLR	Nadezhda Savchenko
—	FW	(Belarus) BLR	Daria Khromko
—	GK	(Belarus) BLR	Ksenia Faley
—	MF	(Belarus) BLR	Viktoria Kurlovich

=== UEFA Women's Champions League Record ===
Season	Stage	Result	Opponent
2001–02	Group Stage	4–1	(Belgium) Eendracht Aalst
		1–6	(Norway) Trondheims-Ørn
		3–1	(Iceland) KR
2002–03	Group Stage	3–2	(Iceland) Breidablik
		6–0	(Moldova) Codru Anenii Noi
		0–3	(Denmark) Fortuna Hjørring
2003–04	Group Stage	2–3	(Greece) Aegina
		1–0	(Azerbaijan) Gömrükçü Baku
		1–1	(Switzerland) Schwerzenbach
2004–05	Qualifying Stage	2–0	(Moldova) Codru Anenii Noi
		2–1	(Estonia) Pärnu
		3–1	(Hungary) Viktoria Szombathelyi
	Group Stage	0–0	(Serbia and Montenegro) Masinac Nis
		1–5	(Sweden) Umeå
		4–0	(Slovenia) Krka Novo Mesto
	Quarterfinals	0–4 1–2	(Norway) Trondheims-Ørn
2011–12	Qualifying Stage	7–0	(Northern Ireland) Newtownabbey Strikers
		0–1	(Croatia) Osijek
		3–0	(Bulgaria) NSA Sofia
	Round of 32	0–4 0–6	(England) Arsenal
2013–14	Qualifying Stage	3–1	(Albania) Ada Velipojë
		1–3	(Slovenia) Pomurje
		0–0	(Poland) Racibórz

== Titles ==
- Belarusian Premier League:
  - Winners (11): 1997, 1998, 1999, 2000, 2001, 2002, 2003, 2004, 2010, 2011, 2012
- Belarusian Women's Cup:
  - Winners (10): 1995, 1996, 1997, 1998, 1999, 2000, 2001, 2002, 2003, 2008
- Belarusian Women's Super Cup:
  - Winners (2): 2011, 2012

1995 cup title as Trikotazhnitsa Bobruisk.
