= 2022–23 UEFA Women's Champions League qualifying rounds =

Tournament details
- Dates: 18 August–29 September 2022
- Teams: 68

The 2022–23 UEFA Women's Champions League qualifying rounds began on 18 August and ended on 29 September 2022.

A total of 68 teams competed in the group stage qualifying rounds of the 2022–23 UEFA Women's Champions League, which included two rounds, with 46 teams in the Champions Path and 22 teams in the League Path. The 12 winners in the round 2 (seven from Champions Path, five from League Path) advanced to the group stage, joining the four teams that entered in that round.

Times are CEST (UTC+2), as listed by UEFA (local times, if different, are in parentheses).

== Teams ==
=== Champions Path ===
The Champions Path included all league champions which did not qualify directly for the group stage, and consisted of the following rounds:

- Round 1 (42 teams playing one-legged semi-finals, final and third place match): 42 teams which entered in this round.
- Round 2 (14 teams): three teams which entered in this round and eleven winners of the round 1 finals.

Below are the participating teams of the Champions Path (with their 2022 UEFA club coefficients), grouped by the starting rounds.

Key to colours
Winners of round 2 advance to group stage

Round 2
Team	Coeff.
(Czech Republic) Slavia Prague	47.366
(Sweden) Rosengård	38.600
(Denmark) HB Køge	9.550

Round 1
Team	Coeff.
(Italy) Juventus	30.900
(Kazakhstan) BIIK Kazygurt	30.600
(Austria) St. Pölten	25.700
(Switzerland) Zürich	22.500
(Lithuania) Gintra	18.600
(Serbia) Spartak Subotica	16.800
(Albania) Vllaznia	14.400
(Netherlands) Twente	13.900
(Portugal) Benfica	13.600
(Cyprus) Apollon Limassol	13.000
(Belgium) Anderlecht	12.400
(Bosnia and Herzegovina) SFK 2000	11.400
(Romania) U Olimpia Cluj	10.800
(Ukraine) Vorskla Poltava	10.200
(Iceland) Valur	8.350
(Hungary) Ferencváros	8.300
(Greece) PAOK	7.600
(Slovenia) Pomurje	7.400
(Montenegro) Breznica	6.000
(Belarus) Dinamo-BGU Minsk	5.400
(Estonia) Flora	4.600
(Norway) Brann	4.500
(Scotland) Rangers	4.400
(Georgia (country)) Lanchkhuti	3.800
(Croatia) Split	3.700
(Luxembourg) Union FC	3.600
(Faroe Islands) KÍ	3.600
(Republic of Ireland) Shelbourne	3.500
(Malta) Birkirkara	3.000
(Wales) Swansea City	2.900
(Israel) Kiryat Gat	2.800
(Turkey) ALG Spor	2.600
(Latvia) Rīgas FS	2.400
(Moldova) Agarista-ȘS Anenii Noi	2.400
(Northern Ireland) Glentoran	2.200
(Poland) UKS SMS Łódź	2.200
(Finland) KuPS	1.900
(Armenia) Hayasa	1.400
(Bulgaria) Lokomotiv Stara Zagora	1.200
(Kosovo) EP-COM Hajvalia	1.100
(Slovakia) Spartak Myjava	1.100
(North Macedonia) Ljuboten	0.400

=== League Path ===
The League Path includes all league non-champions and consists of the following rounds:

- Round 1 (16 teams playing one-legged semi-finals, final and third place match): 16 teams which enter in this round.
- Round 2 (10 teams): six teams which enter in this round and four winners of the round 1 finals.

Below are the participating teams of the League Path (with their 2022 UEFA club coefficients), grouped by the starting rounds.

Key to colours
Winners of round 2 advance to group stage

Round 2
Team	Coeff.
(France) Paris Saint-Germain	85.666
(Germany) Bayern Munich	84.133
(England) Arsenal	39.200
(Czech Republic) Sparta Prague	34.766
(Sweden) BK Häcken	20.833
(Spain) Real Sociedad	13.233

Round 1
Team	Coeff.
(England) Manchester City	63.200
(Scotland) Glasgow City	33.400
(Denmark) Fortuna Hjørring	28.550
(Spain) Real Madrid	26.233
(Belarus) FC Minsk	23.400
(Netherlands) Ajax	20.900
(Iceland) Breiðablik	17.850
(France) Paris FC	17.666
(Germany) Eintracht Frankfurt	15.133
(Switzerland) Servette	10.500
(Sweden) Kristianstads DFF	8.833
(Czech Republic) Slovácko	7.766
(Austria) Sturm Graz	6.700
(Norway) Rosenborg	6.500
(Italy) Roma	5.900
(Kazakhstan) Tomiris-Turan	4.600

== Format ==
Round 1 consisted of mini-tournaments with two semi-finals, a final and a third-place play-off hosted by one of the participating teams. If the score was level at the end of normal time, extra time was played, and if the same number of goals were scored by both teams during extra time, the tie was decided by a penalty shoot-out. Round 2 was played over two legs, with each team playing one leg at home. The team that scored more goals on aggregate over the two legs advanced to the next round. If the aggregate score was level at the end of normal time of the second leg, extra time was played, and if the same number of goals was scored by both teams at the end of normal time, the tie was decided by a penalty shoot-out. An additional preliminary round consisting of two-legged home-and-away matches would have been played by the champions from the lowest-ranked associations if more than 50 associations had entered the tournament and the title holders hadn't qualified through league position. Since only 50 associations entered, this round was skipped.

In the draws for each round, teams were seeded based on their UEFA club coefficients at the beginning of the season, with the teams divided into seeded and unseeded pots containing the same number of teams. Prior to the draws, UEFA may form "groups" in accordance with the principles set by the Club Competitions Committee, but they are purely for convenience of the draw and do not resemble any real groupings in the sense of the competition. Teams from associations with political conflicts as decided by UEFA may not be drawn into the same tie. After the draws, the order of legs of a tie could have been reversed by UEFA due to scheduling or venue conflicts.

== Schedule ==
The schedule of the competition was as follows (all draws were held at the UEFA headquarters in Nyon, Switzerland).

Schedule for 2022–23 UEFA Women's Champions League qualifying rounds
Round	Draw date	First leg	Second leg
Round 1	24 June 2022	18 August 2022 (semi-finals)	21 August 2022 (third-place play-off & final)
Round 2	1 September 2022	20–21 September 2022	28–29 September 2022

== Round 1 ==
The draw for Round 1 was held on 24 June 2022. A total of 58 teams played in Round 1.

=== Seeding ===
Seeding of teams for the semi-final round was based on their 2022 UEFA club coefficients, with 22 seeded teams and 20 unseeded teams in the Champions Path, and eight seeded teams and eight unseeded teams in the League Path. Teams were drawn into two semi-finals within each four team group and, for the groups with three teams, the team with the highest coefficient was given a bye to the final. In the semi-finals, seeded teams were considered the "home" team, while in the third-place play-offs and finals, the teams with the highest coefficients was considered the "home" team for administrative purposes. Due to political reasons, teams from the following associations could not be drawn into the same group: Kosovo / Bosnia and Herzegovina; Kosovo / Serbia; Ukraine / Belarus.

Champions Path
Seeded	Unseeded
(Italy) Juventus; (Kazakhstan) BIIK Kazygurt; (Austria) St. Pölten; (Switzerland) Zürich; (Lithuania) Gintra; (Serbia) Spartak Subotica; (Albania) Vllaznia; (Netherlands) Twente; (Portugal) Benfica; (Cyprus) Apollon Limassol; (Belgium) Anderlecht; (Bosnia and Herzegovina) SFK 2000; (Romania) U Olimpia Cluj; (Ukraine) Vorskla-Kharkiv-2; (Iceland) Valur; (Hungary) Ferencváros; (Greece) PAOK; (Slovenia) Pomurje; (Montenegro) Breznica; (Belarus) Dinamo-BGU Minsk; (Estonia) Flora; (Norway) Brann	(Scotland) Rangers; (Georgia (country)) Lanchkhuti; (Croatia) Split; (Luxembourg) Union FC; (Faroe Islands) KÍ; (Republic of Ireland) Shelbourne; (Malta) Birkirkara; (Wales) Swansea City; (Israel) Kiryat Gat; (Turkey) ALG Spor; (Latvia) Rīgas FS; (Moldova) Agarista-ȘS Anenii Noi; (Northern Ireland) Glentoran; (Poland) UKS SMS Łódź; (Finland) KuPS; (Armenia) Hayasa; (Bulgaria) Lokomotiv Stara Zagora; (Kosovo) EP-COM Hajvalia; (Slovakia) Spartak Myjava; (North Macedonia) Ljuboten

League Path
Seeded	Unseeded
(England) Manchester City; (Scotland) Glasgow City; (Denmark) Fortuna Hjørring; (Spain) Real Madrid; (Belarus) FC Minsk; (Netherlands) Ajax; (Iceland) Breiðablik; (France) Paris FC	(Germany) Eintracht Frankfurt; (Switzerland) Servette; (Sweden) Kristianstads DFF; (Czech Republic) Slovácko; (Austria) Sturm Graz; (Norway) Rosenborg; (Italy) Roma; (Kazakhstan) Tomiris-Turan

=== Champions Path ===
==== Tournament 1 ====
===== Bracket =====
Hosted by Pomurje.

Semi-finals
18 August
(Iceland) Valur	2
(Armenia) Hayasa	0
18 August
(Slovenia) Pomurje	0
(Republic of Ireland) Shelbourne	1

Final
21 August
(Iceland) Valur	3
(Republic of Ireland) Shelbourne	0
Third place
21 August
(Armenia) Hayasa	1
(Slovenia) Pomurje	2

===== Semi-finals =====
18 August 2022
11:00

Valur (Iceland)	2–0	(Armenia) Hayasa
Hintzen 14'; Speckmaier 90' (pen.)	Report

Športni park Radenci, Radenci
Attendance: 30
Referee: Silvia Gasperotti (Italy)

18 August 2022
17:30

Pomurje (Slovenia)	0–1	(Republic of Ireland) Shelbourne
	Report	O'Reilly 4'

Fazanerija City Stadium, Murska Sobota
Attendance: 700
Referee: Frederikke Lydia Søkjær (Denmark)

===== Third-place play-off =====
21 August 2022
11:00

Pomurje (Slovenia)	2–1	(Armenia) Hayasa
Kos 27'; K. Horvat 34'	Report	Voronina 48'

Športni park Radenci, Radenci
Attendance: 300
Referee: Ioanna Allayiotou (Cyprus)

===== Final =====
21 August 2022
17:30

Valur (Iceland)	3–0	(Republic of Ireland) Shelbourne
Hintzen 20'; Jóhannesdóttir 45'; Viðarsdóttir 46'	Report

Fazanerija City Stadium, Murska Sobota
Attendance: 100
Referee: Volha Tsiareshka (Belarus)

==== Tournament 2 ====
===== Bracket =====
Hosted by PAOK.

Semi-finals
18 August
(Greece) PAOK	2
(Wales) Swansea City	0
18 August
(Hungary) Ferencváros	1
(Scotland) Rangers	3

Final
21 August
(Greece) PAOK	0
(Scotland) Rangers	4
Third place
21 August
(Wales) Swansea City	0
(Hungary) Ferencváros	7

===== Semi-finals =====
18 August 2022
15:30

PAOK (Greece)	2–0	(Wales) Swansea City
Vlassopoulos 16', 70'	Report

Katerini Stadium, Katerini
Attendance: 200
Referee: Olivia Tschon (Austria)

18 August 2022
20:00

Ferencváros (Hungary)	1–3	(Scotland) Rangers
Fishley 69'	Report	Danielsson 14' (pen.); Cornet 48'; Hay 89'

Katerini Stadium, Katerini
Attendance: 15
Referee: Jurgita Mačikunytė (Lithuania)

===== Third-place play-off =====
21 August 2022
20:30

Swansea City (Wales)	0–7	(Hungary) Ferencváros
	Report	Fishley 35'; Szabó 38', 55'; Bradić 51'; Papp 70'; Barker 83'; Lake 87' (og.)

Katerini Stadium, Katerini
Attendance: 45
Referee: Kateryna Usova (Ukraine)

===== Final =====
21 August 2022
15:30

PAOK (Greece)	0–4	(Scotland) Rangers
	Report	Docherty 50'; Davison 58'; Papaioannou 70' (o.g.); Arnot 86'

Katerini Stadium, Katerini
Attendance: 200
Referee: Alina Peşu (Romania)

==== Tournament 3 ====
===== Bracket =====
Hosted by Split.

Semi-finals
18 August
(Ukraine) Vorskla-Kharkiv-2	5
(Georgia (country)) Lanchkhuti	0
18 August
(Kazakhstan) BIIK Kazygurt	5
(Croatia) Split	1

Final
21 August
(Ukraine) Vorskla-Kharkiv-2	2
(Kazakhstan) BIIK Kazygurt	0
Third place
21 August
(Georgia (country)) Lanchkhuti	0
(Croatia) Split	2

===== Semi-finals =====
18 August 2022
11:00

Vorskla-Kharkiv-2 (Ukraine)	5–0	(Georgia (country)) Lanchkhuti
Kotiash 1', 90+2'; Kravchuk 7'; Kalinina 40'; Osipyan 78'	Report

Stadion Varteks, Varaždin
Attendance: 60
Referee: Meitar Shemesh (Israel)

18 August 2022
18:00

BIIK Kazygurt (Kazakhstan)	5–1	(Croatia) Split
Chanda 18', 49', 64'; Gabelia 58'; Babshuk 88' (pen.)	Report	Kapetanović 77'

Stadion Varteks, Varaždin
Attendance: 350
Referee: Anastasia Mylopoulou (Greece)

===== Third-place play-off =====
21 August 2022
11:00

Lanchkhuti (Georgia (country))	0–2	(Croatia) Split
	Report	Hadžić 36' (pen.); Mikulica 67'

Stadion Varteks, Varaždin
Attendance: 100
Referee: Emanuela Rusta (Albania)

===== Final =====
21 August 2022
18:00

BIIK Kazygurt (Kazakhstan)	0–2	(Ukraine) Vorskla-Kharkiv-2
	Report	Korsun 52'; Kravchuk 79'

Stadion Varteks, Varaždin
Attendance: 100
Referee: Minka Vekkeli (Finland)

==== Tournament 4 ====
===== Bracket =====
Hosted by Apollon Limassol.

Semi-finals
18 August
(Cyprus) Apollon Limassol	3
(Latvia) Rīgas FS	0
18 August
(Switzerland) Zürich	6
(Faroe Islands) KÍ	0

Final
21 August
(Cyprus) Apollon Limassol	0
(Switzerland) Zürich	1
Third place
21 August
(Latvia) Rīgas FS (a.e.t.)	2
(Faroe Islands) KÍ	1

===== Semi-finals =====
18 August 2022
16:30

Apollon Limassol (Cyprus)	3–0	(Latvia) Rīgas FS
Gómez 16'; Rojas 27'; Acheampong 88'	Report

Makario Stadium, Nicosia
Attendance: 150
Referee: Irena Velevačkoska (North Macedonia)

18 August 2022
21:00

Zürich (Switzerland)	6–0	(Faroe Islands) KÍ
Riesen 9'; Humm 23'; Dubs 25'; Pinther 59'; Bernauer 62'; Mégroz 90+3'	Report

Makario Stadium, Nicosia
Attendance: 24
Referee: Sofik Torosyan (Armenia)

===== Third-place play-off =====
21 August 2022
21:00

KÍ (Faroe Islands)	1–2 (a.e.t.)	(Latvia) Rīgas FS
Klakstein 88'	Report	Ovsjankina 15' (pen.); Poļuhoviča 113'

Makario Stadium, Nicosia
Attendance: 5
Referee: Réka Molnár (Hungary)

===== Final =====
21 August 2022
16:30

Zürich (Switzerland)	1–0	(Cyprus) Apollon Limassol
Pinther 60'	Report

Makario Stadium, Nicosia
Attendance: 155
Referee: Eléni Andoníou (Greece)

==== Tournament 5 ====
===== Bracket =====
Hosted by UKS SMS Łódź.

Semi-finals
18 August
(Lithuania) Gintra	0
(Finland) KuPS	2
18 August
(Belgium) Anderlecht	3
(Poland) UKS SMS Łódź	2

Final
21 August
(Finland) KuPS (a.e.t.) (p)	2 (4)
(Belgium) Anderlecht	2 (3)
Third place
21 August
(Lithuania) Gintra	0
(Poland) UKS SMS Łódź	1

===== Semi-finals =====
18 August 2022
14:00

Gintra (Lithuania)	0–2	(Finland) KuPS
	Report	Ruuskanen 28'; Begolli 35'

Stadion Miejski im. Władysława Króla, Łódź
Attendance: 125
Referee: Tanja Račić (Bosnia and Herzegovina)

18 August 2022
20:00

Anderlecht (Belgium)	3–2	(Poland) UKS SMS Łódź
Thornton 57', 90+1'; Wajnblum 66'	Report	Rędzia 13'; Kopińska 49' (pen.)

Stadion Miejski im. Władysława Króla, Łódź
Attendance: 1,884
Referee: Louise Thompson (Northern Ireland)

===== Third-place play-off =====
21 August 2022
12:00

Gintra (Lithuania)	0–1	(Poland) UKS SMS Łódź
	Report	Rędzia 66'

Stadion Miejski im. Władysława Króla, Łódź
Attendance: 396
Referee: Alexandra Collin (France)

===== Final =====
21 August 2022
18:00

Anderlecht (Belgium)	2–2 (a.e.t.)	(Finland) KuPS
Vătafu 35'; Wijnants 102'	Report	Rochi 55' (pen.), 119'
Penalties
Deloose (penalty scored); Toloba (penalty scored); Wijnants (penalty scored); De Keijzer (penalty missed); Vătafu (penalty missed)	3–4	(penalty scored) Rochi; (penalty scored) Peuhkurinen; (penalty scored) Siren; (penalty missed) Nora; (penalty scored) Simonen

Stadion Miejski im. Władysława Króla, Łódź
Attendance: 255
Referee: Jelena Cvetković (Serbia)

==== Tournament 6 ====
===== Bracket =====
Hosted by Juventus.

Semi-finals
18 August
(Estonia) Flora	0
(Israel) Kiryat Gat	5
18 August
(Italy) Juventus	4
(Luxembourg) Union FC	0

Final
21 August
(Israel) Kiryat Gat	1
(Italy) Juventus	3
Third place
21 August
(Estonia) Flora	1
(Luxembourg) Union FC	3

===== Semi-finals =====
18 August 2022
15:30

Flora (Estonia)	0–5	(Israel) Kiryat Gat
	Report	Da Silva Lima 3', 12', 52'; Horovitz 68'; Nakav 84'

Juventus Training Center, Turin
Attendance: 25
Referee: Merima Čelik (Bosnia and Herzegovina)

18 August 2022
20:30

Juventus (Italy)	4–0	(Luxembourg) Union FC
Rosucci 11'; Girelli 21'; Caruso 54'; Bonfantini 61'	Report

Juventus Training Center, Turin
Attendance: 459
Referee: Jelena Kumer (Croatia)

===== Third-place play-off =====
21 August 2022
15:30

Flora (Estonia)	1–3	(Luxembourg) Union FC
Volkov 51'	Report	Kohr 43', 54'; Dos Santos 60'

Juventus Training Center, Turin
Attendance: 32
Referee: Ana Maria Alexandra Terteleac (Romania)

===== Final =====
21 August 2022
20:30

Juventus (Italy)	3–1	(Israel) Kiryat Gat
Cantore 35'; Zamanian 48'; Caruso 90'	Report	Helena 52'

Juventus Training Center, Turin
Attendance: 429
Referee: María Dolores Martínez Madrona (Spain)

==== Tournament 7 ====
===== Bracket =====
Hosted by U Olimpia Cluj.

Semi-finals
18 August
(Bosnia and Herzegovina) SFK 2000	4
(Malta) Birkirkara	0
18 August
(Romania) U Olimpia Cluj (a.e.t.) (p)	0 (4)
(Northern Ireland) Glentoran	0 (2)

Final
21 August
(Bosnia and Herzegovina) SFK 2000	2
(Romania) U Olimpia Cluj	1
Third place
21 August
(Malta) Birkirkara	2
(Northern Ireland) Glentoran	1

===== Semi-finals =====
18 August 2022
10:00

SFK 2000 (Bosnia and Herzegovina)	4–0	(Malta) Birkirkara
Gačanica 15', 69'; Al. Spahić 50'; Krajnić 81'	Report

Cluj Arena, Cluj-Napoca
Attendance: 75
Referee: Oxana Cruc (Moldova)

18 August 2022
17:00

U Olimpia Cluj (Romania)	0–0 (a.e.t.)	(Northern Ireland) Glentoran
	Report
Penalties
Ciolacu (penalty scored); Borodi (penalty scored); Pérez (penalty scored); Giurgiu (penalty missed); García (penalty scored)	4–2	(penalty scored) Foy; (penalty missed) McDade; (penalty missed) Andrews; (penalty scored) Bailie

Cluj Arena, Cluj-Napoca
Attendance: 1,200
Referee: Michèle Schmölzer (Switzerland)

===== Third-place play-off =====
21 August 2022
10:00

Birkirkara (Malta)	2–1	(Northern Ireland) Glentoran
Giusti 47'; Zammit 58'	Report	Bailie 13'

Cluj Arena, Cluj-Napoca
Attendance: 20
Referee: Anastasiya Romanyuk (Ukraine)

===== Final =====
21 August 2022
17:00

SFK 2000 (Bosnia and Herzegovina)	2–1	(Romania) U Olimpia Cluj
Jelčić 33'; Milinković 69'	Report	Ciolacu 68'

Cluj Arena, Cluj-Napoca
Attendance: 900
Referee: Lucie Šulcová (Czech Republic)

==== Tournament 8 ====
===== Bracket =====
Hosted by Twente.

Semi-finals
18 August
(Portugal) Benfica	9
(Kosovo) EP-COM Hajvalia	0
18 August
(Netherlands) Twente	13
(Moldova) Agarista-ȘS Anenii Noi	0

Final
21 August
(Portugal) Benfica	2
(Netherlands) Twente	1
Third place
21 August
(Kosovo) EP-COM Hajvalia	7
(Moldova) Agarista-ȘS Anenii Noi	0

===== Semi-finals =====
18 August 2022
12:00

Benfica (Portugal)	9–0	(Kosovo) EP-COM Hajvalia
Rebelo 8'; Cintra 15', 43', 59'; Silva 48'; Ana Vitória 57'; Norton 63'; Lacasse 64'; Alves 90+2'	Report

Sportcampus Diekman, Enschede
Attendance: 20
Referee: Gamze Durmuş (Turkey)

18 August 2022
18:00

Twente (Netherlands)	13–0	(Moldova) Agarista-ȘS Anenii Noi
Van Dooren 7'; Kalma 19', 22', 23', 27', 61', 90'; Stolze 31', 38'; B. Jansen 49'; R. Jansen 53'; Saitain 84' (o.g.); Te Brake 89'	Report

Sportcampus Diekman, Enschede
Attendance: 350
Referee: Andromachi Tsiofliki (Greece)

===== Third-place play-off =====
21 August 2022
12:00

Agarista-ȘS Anenii Noi (Moldova)	0–7	(Kosovo) EP-COM Hajvalia
	Report	Ramaj 20'; Berisha 31', 52', 79', 82'; Kastrati 34' (pen.); Krasniqi 90+1'

Sportcampus Diekman, Enschede
Attendance: 45
Referee: Kristina Georgieva (Bulgaria)

===== Final =====
21 August 2022
18:00

Twente (Netherlands)	1–2	(Portugal) Benfica
R. Jansen 71'	Report	Ana Vitória 11'; Nazareth 61'

Sportcampus Diekman, Enschede
Attendance: 500
Referee: Maria Marotta (Italy)

==== Tournament 9 ====
===== Bracket =====
Hosted by Ljuboten.

Semi-finals
18 August
(Belarus) Dinamo-BGU Minsk	5
(Bulgaria) Lokomotiv Stara Zagora	0
18 August
(Austria) St. Pölten	7
(North Macedonia) Ljuboten	0

Final
21 August
(Belarus) Dinamo-BGU Minsk	0
(Austria) St. Pölten	3
Third place
21 August
(Bulgaria) Lokomotiv Stara Zagora	5
(North Macedonia) Ljuboten	1

===== Semi-finals =====
18 August 2022
11:00

Dinamo-BGU Minsk (Belarus)	5–0	(Bulgaria) Lokomotiv Stara Zagora
Pilipenko 33', 87'; Valiuk 45+1', 76'; Linnik 67'	Report

FFM Training Centre (small stadium), Skopje
Attendance: 72
Referee: Martina Molinaro (Italy)

18 August 2022
17:00

St. Pölten (Austria)	7–0	(North Macedonia) Ljuboten
Mikolajová 3'; Zver 5'; Meyer 12', 49'; Fuchs 52', 90+1'; Schumacher 90+3'	Report

FFM Training Centre, Skopje
Attendance: 238
Referee: Olatz Rivera Olmedo (Spain)

===== Third-place play-off =====
21 August 2022
17:00

Lokomotiv Stara Zagora (Bulgaria)	5–1	(North Macedonia) Ljuboten
G. Naydenova 2'; Skorynina 16'; Rus 44' (pen.), 48'; Lopes Varela 45+1'	Report	Jankovska 68'

FFM Training Centre, Skopje
Attendance: 78
Referee: Zoí Stávrou (Cyprus)

===== Final =====
21 August 2022
11:00

St. Pölten (Austria)	3–0	(Belarus) Dinamo-BGU Minsk
Zágor 10'; Voulania Dabda 18' (o.g.); Brunnthaler 77'	Report

FFM Training Centre (small stadium), Skopje
Attendance: 50
Referee: Rasa Grigonė (Lithuania)

==== Tournament 10 ====
===== Bracket =====
Hosted by Breznica.

Semi-finals
18 August
(Montenegro) Breznica	2
(Slovakia) Spartak Myjava	3

Final
21 August
(Slovakia) Spartak Myjava	0
(Albania) Vllaznia	1

===== Semi-finals =====
18 August 2022
18:00

Breznica (Montenegro)	2–3	(Slovakia) Spartak Myjava
Đurđevac 13'; Vujadinović 20'	Report	Retkesová 26', 85'; Bogorová 76' (pen.)

Stadion Mitar Mićo Goliš, Petrovac
Attendance: 300
Referee: Liudmyla Telbukh (Ukraine)

===== Final =====
21 August 2022
18:00

Vllaznia (Albania)	1–0	(Slovakia) Spartak Myjava
Shala 44'	Report

Stadion Mitar Mićo Goliš, Petrovac
Attendance: 200
Referee: Tatıana Sorokopýdova (Kazakhstan)

==== Tournament 11 ====
===== Bracket =====
Hosted by Spartak Subotica.

Semi-finals
18 August
(Norway) Brann	1
(Turkey) ALG Spor	0

Final
21 August
(Norway) Brann	3
(Serbia) Spartak Subotica	1

===== Semi-finals =====
18 August 2022
17:00

Brann (Norway)	1–0	(Turkey) ALG Spor
Brochmann 4'	Report

TSC Arena, Bačka Topola
Attendance: 157
Referee: Caroline Lanssens (Belgium)

===== Final =====
21 August 2022
19:00

Spartak Subotica (Serbia)	1–3	(Norway) Brann
Filipović 72'	Report	Engesvik 21'; Yallop 25'; Brochmann 55'

Subotica City Stadium, Subotica
Attendance: 490
Referee: Viola Raudziņa (Latvia)

=== League Path ===
==== Tournament 1 ====
===== Bracket =====
Hosted by Glasgow City.

Semi-finals
18 August
(France) Paris FC	3
(Switzerland) Servette	0
18 August
(Scotland) Glasgow City	1
(Italy) Roma	3

Final
21 August
(France) Paris FC	0 (4)
(Italy) Roma (a.e.t.) (p)	0 (5)
Third place
21 August
(Switzerland) Servette	1
(Scotland) Glasgow City	0

===== Semi-finals =====
18 August 2022
14:00

Paris FC (France)	3–0	(Switzerland) Servette
Matéo 9', 85'; Clemaron 32' (o.g.)	Report

Petershill Park, Glasgow
Attendance: 51
Referee: Veronika Kovarova (Czech Republic)

18 August 2022
20:35

Glasgow City (Scotland)	1–3	(Italy) Roma
Minami 20' (o.g.)	Report	Glionna 12', 59'; Lázaro 81'

Petershill Park, Glasgow
Attendance: 784
Referee: Ainara Acevedo (Spain)

===== Third-place play-off =====
21 August 2022
13:00

Servette (Switzerland)	1–0	(Scotland) Glasgow City
Korhonen 90+2'	Report

Petershill Park, Glasgow
Attendance: 162
Referee: Frida Mia Klarlund (Denmark)

===== Final =====
21 August 2022
19:00

Paris FC (France)	0–0 (a.e.t.)	(Italy) Roma
	Report
Penalties
Thiney (penalty scored); Matéo (penalty missed); Sarr (penalty scored); Greboval (penalty scored); Butel (penalty scored)	4–5	(penalty scored) Giugliano; (penalty scored) Andressa; (penalty scored) Serturini; (penalty scored) Linari; (penalty scored) Haavi

Petershill Park, Glasgow
Attendance: 95
Referee: Angelika Söder (Germany)

==== Tournament 2 ====
===== Bracket =====
Hosted by Rosenborg.

Semi-finals
18 August
(Belarus) FC Minsk	2
(Czech Republic) Slovácko	1
18 August
(Iceland) Breiðablik	2
(Norway) Rosenborg	4

Final
21 August
(Belarus) FC Minsk	0
(Norway) Rosenborg	1
Third place
21 August
(Czech Republic) Slovácko	0
(Iceland) Breiðablik	3

===== Semi-finals =====
18 August 2022
11:00

FC Minsk (Belarus)	2–1	(Czech Republic) Slovácko
Pobegaylo 24'; Surovtseva 33'	Report	Jelínková 84'

Koteng Arena, Trondheim
Attendance: 47
Referee: Abigail Marriott (England)

18 August 2022
17:00

Breiðablik (Iceland)	2–4	(Norway) Rosenborg
Anasi 67'; Hálfdánardóttir 69'	Report	Nautnes 4', 19', 47'; Andreassen 11'

Koteng Arena, Trondheim
Attendance: 411
Referee: Galiya Echeva (Bulgaria)

===== Third-place play-off =====
21 August 2022
11:00

Slovácko (Czech Republic)	0–3	(Iceland) Breiðablik
	Report	Hálfdánardóttir 44', 79', 81'

Koteng Arena, Trondheim
Attendance: 30
Referee: Reelika Turi (Estonia)

===== Final =====
21 August 2022
17:00

FC Minsk (Belarus)	0–1	(Norway) Rosenborg
	Report	Nautnes 84'

Koteng Arena, Trondheim
Attendance: 350
Referee: Ewa Augustyn (Poland)

==== Tournament 3 ====
===== Bracket =====
Hosted by Fortuna Hjørring.

Semi-finals
18 August
(Netherlands) Ajax	3
(Sweden) Kristianstads DFF	1
18 August
(Denmark) Fortuna Hjørring	0
(Germany) Eintracht Frankfurt	2

Final
21 August
(Netherlands) Ajax	2
(Germany) Eintracht Frankfurt	1
Third place
21 August
(Sweden) Kristianstads DFF (a.e.t.)	3
(Denmark) Fortuna Hjørring	2

===== Semi-finals =====
18 August 2022
14:00

Ajax (Netherlands)	3–1	(Sweden) Kristianstads DFF
Pelova 63'; Bakker 83'; Grant 90+3'	Report	Viens 19'

Hjørring Stadium, Hjørring
Attendance: 123
Referee: Victoria Beyer (France)

18 August 2022
19:00

Fortuna Hjørring (Denmark)	0–2	(Germany) Eintracht Frankfurt
	Report	Prašnikar 15'; Ficzay 18' (o.g.)

Hjørring Stadium, Hjørring
Attendance: 507
Referee: Katalin Sipos (Hungary)

===== Third-place play-off =====
21 August 2022
18:00

Fortuna Hjørring (Denmark)	2–3 (a.e.t.)	(Sweden) Kristianstads DFF
Larsen 14'; Ficzay 66'	Report	Carle 26', 115'; Andradóttir 73'

Hjørring Stadium, Hjørring
Attendance: 170
Referee: Justina Lavrenovaitė-Perez (Lithuania)

===== Final =====
21 August 2022
13:00

Ajax (Netherlands)	2–1	(Germany) Eintracht Frankfurt
Grant 8'; Bakker 90+2'	Report	Prašnikar 57'

Hjørring Stadium, Hjørring
Attendance: 183
Referee: Sabina Bolić (Croatia)

==== Tournament 4 ====
===== Bracket =====
Hosted by Real Madrid.

Semi-finals
18 August
(England) Manchester City	6
(Kazakhstan) Tomiris-Turan	0
18 August
(Spain) Real Madrid	6
(Austria) Sturm Graz	0

Final
21 August
(England) Manchester City	0
(Spain) Real Madrid	1
Third place
21 August
(Austria) Sturm Graz	5
(Kazakhstan) Tomiris-Turan	1

===== Semi-finals =====
18 August 2022
21:00

Real Madrid (Spain)	6–0	(Austria) Sturm Graz
González 12', 52', 62', 67'; Feller 37'; Del Castillo 74'	Report

Alfredo Di Stéfano, Madrid
Attendance: 2,340
Referee: Aleksandra Česen (Slovenia)

18 August 2022
21:00

Manchester City (England)	6–0	(Kazakhstan) Tomiris-Turan
Shaw 4', 21'; Hemp 45+1'; Losada 82'; Castellanos 89' (pen.); Sharifova 90+2' (o.g.)	Report

Campo 11, Madrid
Attendance: 89
Referee: Marina Živković (Serbia)

===== Third-place play-off =====
21 August 2022
11:00

Sturm Graz (Austria)	5–1	(Kazakhstan) Tomiris-Turan
Matuschewski 2', 21'; Wirnsberger 45'; Uka 88'; Bertolo 90+7'	Report	Nurusheva 69'

Campo 11, Madrid
Attendance: 57
Referee: Maria Sole Ferrieri Caputi (Italy)

===== Final =====
21 August 2022
21:00

Manchester City (England)	0–1	(Spain) Real Madrid
	Report	Weir 15'

Alfredo Di Stéfano, Madrid
Attendance: 2,811
Referee: Shona Shukrula (Netherlands)

== Round 2 ==
The draw for Round 2 was held on 1 September 2022.

=== Seeding ===
A total of 24 teams played in Round 2. They were divided into two paths:

- Champions Path (14 teams): three teams which entered in this round, and 11 winners of Round 1 (Champions Path).
- League Path (10 teams): six teams which entered in this round, and four winners of Round 1 (League Path).

Seeding of teams was based on their 2022 UEFA club coefficients, with 7 seeded teams and 7 unseeded teams in the Champions Path, and 5 seeded teams and 5 unseeded teams in the League Path. Teams from the same association in the League Path could not be drawn against each other. The first team drawn in each tie would be the home team of the first leg.

Champions Path
Seeded	Unseeded
(Czech Republic) Slavia Prague; (Sweden) Rosengård; (Italy) Juventus; (Austria) St. Pölten; (Switzerland) Zürich; (Albania) Vllaznia; (Portugal) Benfica	(Bosnia and Herzegovina) SFK 2000; (Ukraine) Vorskla Poltava; (Denmark) HB Køge; (Iceland) Valur; (Norway) Brann; (Scotland) Rangers; (Finland) KuPS

League Path
Seeded	Unseeded
(France) Paris Saint-Germain; (Germany) Bayern Munich; (England) Arsenal; (Czech Republic) Sparta Prague; (Spain) Real Madrid	(Netherlands) Ajax; (Sweden) BK Häcken; (Spain) Real Sociedad; (Norway) Rosenborg; (Italy) Roma

=== Summary ===
The first legs were played on 20 and 21 September 2022, and the second legs were played on 28 and 29 September 2022.

The winners of the ties advanced to the group stage.

Champions Path
Team 1	Agg.	Team 2	1st leg	2nd leg
Vorskla Poltava (Ukraine)	2–3	(Albania) Vllaznia	1–1	1–2
SFK 2000 (Bosnia and Herzegovina)	0–10	(Switzerland) Zürich	0–7	0–3
Rangers (Scotland)	3–5	(Portugal) Benfica	2–3	1–2 (a.e.t.)
KuPS (Finland)	2–3	(Austria) St. Pölten	0–1	2–2 (a.e.t.)
Valur (Iceland)	0–1	(Czech Republic) Slavia Prague	0–1	0–0
Brann (Norway)	2–4	(Sweden) Rosengård	1–1	1–3
HB Køge (Denmark)	1–3	(Italy) Juventus	1–1	0–2

League Path
Team 1	Agg.	Team 2	1st leg	2nd leg
Arsenal (England)	3–2	(Netherlands) Ajax	2–2	1–0
Paris Saint-Germain (France)	4–1	(Sweden) BK Häcken	2–1	2–0
Real Sociedad (Spain)	1–4	(Germany) Bayern Munich	0–1	1–3
Rosenborg (Norway)	1–5	(Spain) Real Madrid	0–3	1–2
Sparta Prague (Czech Republic)	2–6	(Italy) Roma	1–2	1–4

==== Champions Path ====
21 September 2022
18:00

Vorskla Poltava (Ukraine)	1–1	(Albania) Vllaznia
Kravchuk 66'	Report	Doçi 54'

Loro Boriçi Stadium, Shkodër, Albania (Note: Due to the Russian invasion of Ukraine, Ukrainian teams are required to play their home matches at neutral venues until further notice.)
Attendance: 2,500
Referee: Kristina Georgieva (Bulgaria)
28 September 2022
16:00

Vllaznia (Albania)	2–1	(Ukraine) Vorskla Poltava
Patterson 35'; Berisha 88'	Report	Korsun 85'

Loro Boriçi Stadium, Shkodër
Attendance: 2,500
Referee: Lucie Šulcová (Czech Republic)

Vllaznia won 3–2 on aggregate.

21 September 2022
15:30

SFK 2000 (Bosnia and Herzegovina)	0–7	(Switzerland) Zürich
	Report	Humm 6', 17', 62'; Vetterlein 45', 80'; Woś 87'; Slišković 90' (o.g.)

Stadion Grbavica, Sarajevo
Attendance: 500
Referee: Katarzyna Lisiecka-Sęk (Poland)
28 September 2022
19:30

Zürich (Switzerland)	3–0	(Bosnia and Herzegovina) SFK 2000
Piubel 6', 29'; Pilgrim 72'	Report

Wefox Arena Schaffhausen, Schaffhausen
Attendance: 450
Referee: Reelika Turi (Estonia)

Zürich won 10–0 on aggregate.

20 September 2022
20:30

Rangers (Scotland)	2–3	(Portugal) Benfica
McCoy 25', 58'	Report	Vitória 38', 57'; Pauleta 78'

Ibrox Stadium, Glasgow
Attendance: 3,522
Referee: Ivana Martinčić (Croatia)
28 September 2022
20:30

Benfica (Portugal)	2–1 (a.e.t.)	(Scotland) Rangers
Lacasse 93'; Silva 119'	Report	Watson 87'

Futebol Campus, Seixal
Attendance: 973
Referee: Marina Živković (Serbia)

Benfica won 5–3 on aggregate.

21 September 2022
17:30

KuPS (Finland)	0–1	(Austria) St. Pölten
	Report	Zver 42'

Kuopion Keskuskenttä, Kuopio
Attendance: 1,306
Referee: Deborah Anex (Switzerland)
28 September 2022
19:15

St. Pölten (Austria)	2–2 (a.e.t.)	(Finland) KuPS
Zver 6', 118'	Report	Hartikainen 28'; Kröger 32'

NV Arena, St Polten
Attendance: 1,070
Referee: Shona Shukrula (Netherlands)

St. Pölten won 3–2 on aggregate.

21 September 2022
19:00

Valur (Iceland)	0–1	(Czech Republic) Slavia Prague
	Report	Kožárová 26'

Hlíðarendi, Reykjavík
Attendance: 386
Referee: Jelena Pejković (Croatia)
28 September 2022
15:00

Slavia Prague (Czech Republic)	0–0	(Iceland) Valur
	Report

Na Chvalech, Prague
Attendance: 753
Referee: Eszter Urbán (Hungary)

Slavia Prague won 1–0 on aggregate.

21 September 2022
18:00

Brann (Norway)	1–1	(Sweden) Rosengård
Guðmundsdóttir 20'	Report	Holdt 78'

Brann Stadion, Bergen
Attendance: 6,331
Referee: Melis Özçiğdem (Turkey)
28 September 2022
18:00

Rosengård (Sweden)	3–1	(Norway) Brann
Bredgaard 50'; Larsson 55', 70'	Report	Brochmann 80'

Malmö Idrottsplats, Malmö
Attendance: 1,612
Referee: Ewa Augustyn (Poland)

Rosengård won 4–2 on aggregate.

20 September 2022
18:00

HB Køge (Denmark)	1–1	(Italy) Juventus
Pokorny 8'	Report	Nildén 21'

Køge Stadion, Koge
Attendance: 1,486
Referee: Iuliana Demetrescu (Romania)
28 September 2022
20:30

Juventus (Italy)	2–0	(Denmark) HB Køge
Gunnarsdóttir 11'; Cantore 77'	Report

Stadio Giuseppe Moccagatta, Alessandria
Attendance: 1,100
Referee: Abigail Marriott (England)

Juventus won 3–1 on aggregate.

==== League Path ====
20 September 2022
20:30

Arsenal (England)	2–2	(Netherlands) Ajax
Blackstenius 23'; Little 57' (pen.)	Report	Leuchter 18', 83'

Meadow Park, Borehamwood
Attendance: 2,550
Referee: Frida Nielsen (Denmark)
28 September 2022
19:00

Ajax (Netherlands)	0–1	(England) Arsenal
	Report	Miedema 51'

De Toekomst, Duivendrecht
Attendance: 1,831
Referee: Marta Huerta de Aza (Spain)

Arsenal won 3–2 on aggregate.

21 September 2022
20:30

Paris Saint-Germain (France)	2–1	(Sweden) BK Häcken
Martens 14'; Diani 86'	Report	Bergman-Lundin 24'

Stade Jean Bouin, Paris
Attendance: 1,671
Referee: Elvira Nurmustafina (Kazakhstan)
28 September 2022
18:45

BK Häcken (Sweden)	0–2	(France) Paris Saint-Germain
	Report	Martens 53'; Diani 60'

Hisingen Arena, Gothenburg
Attendance: 5,118
Referee: Ivana Projkovska (North Macedonia)

Paris Saint-Germain won 4–1 on aggregate.

20 September 2022
19:00

Real Sociedad (Spain)	0–1	(Germany) Bayern Munich
	Report	Schüller 45'

Anoeta, San Sebastián
Attendance: 11,443
Referee: Maria Sole Caputi (Italy)
29 September 2022
19:00

Bayern Munich (Germany)	3–1	(Spain) Real Sociedad
Dallmann 18', 22'; Schüller 43'	Report	Jensen 45'

FC Bayern Campus, Munich
Attendance: 1,652
Referee: Tess Olofsson (Sweden)

Bayern Munich won 4–1 on aggregate.

21 September 2022
18:00

Rosenborg (Norway)	0–3	(Spain) Real Madrid
	Report	Weir 14', 52'; Del Castillo 34'

Lerkendal Stadion, Trondheim
Attendance: 6,334
Referee: Michèle Schmölzer (Switzerland)
28 September 2022
20:00

Real Madrid (Spain)	2–1	(Norway) Rosenborg
Weir 48'; Del Castillo 61'	Report	Nautnes 8'

Alfredo Di Stéfano, Madrid
Attendance: 1,374
Referee: Rebecca Welch (England)

Real Madrid won 5–1 on aggregate.

21 September 2022
18:30

Sparta Prague (Czech Republic)	1–2	(Italy) Roma
Martínková 51'	Report	Bartoli 78'; Haavi 90'

Stadion Letná, Prague
Attendance: 1,682
Referee: Justina Lavrenovaitė-Perez (Lithuania)
29 September 2022
14:30

Roma (Italy)	4–1	(Czech Republic) Sparta Prague
Wenninger 35'; Andressa 55'; Minami 70'; Haavi 82'	Report	Bertholdová 25'

Estadio Tre Fontane, Rome
Attendance: 990
Referee: Jelena Međedović (Serbia)

Roma won 6–2 on aggregate.
