= Mariam Danelia (footballer) =

Georgian footballer (born 1997)

Personal information
- Date of birth: 6 May 1997 (age 29)
- Position: Forward

Senior career*
| Years | Team | Apps | (Gls) |
- KSK Lanchkhuti
| 2021–2022 | Sivasspor | 9 | (0) |

International career^{‡}
- Georgia
- * Club domestic league appearances and goals as of 13 February 2022 ‡ National team caps and goals as of 17:48, 29 August 2019 (UTC)

Mariam Danelia (Georgian: მარიამ დანელია; born 6 May 1997) is a Georgian footballer, who plays as a forward. She last played for Sivasspor in the Turkish Women's Super league, and was a member of the Georgia women's national team.

== Club career ==
She played for KSK Lanchkhuti in her country, and took part at the 202–21 UEFA Women's Champions League.

By December 2021, Danelia moved to Turkey and signed with the newly founded club Sivasspor to play in the 2021-22 Turkcell Super League. After capping in nine matches, she returned home on 22 February 2022.

== International career ==
Danelia has been capped for the Georgia national team, appearing for the team during the 2019 FIFA Women's World Cup qualifying cycle.
