= Anastasia Bolkvadze =

Georgian footballer

Personal information
- Date of birth: 6 November 2002 (age 24)
- Position: Forward

Team information
- Current team: WFC Lanchkhuti
- Number: 14

Senior career*
Years	Team	Apps	(Gls)
2019–2021	FC Tbilisi Nike		
2021–2022	Altay	2	(0)
2022–2023	WFC Lanchkhuti	2	(0)
2024–2025	FC Kvartali	9	(12)
2025–	WFC Lanchkhuti		

International career^{‡}
2017–2019	Georgia U17	9	(0)
2018	Georgia U19	3	(0)
2020–	Georgia women’s national team	2	(0)
- * Club domestic league appearances and goals as of 25 December 2021 ‡ National team caps and goals as of 1 December 2020.

Anastasia Bolkvadze (Georgian: ანასტასია ბოლქვაძე; born 6 November 2002) is a Georgian footballer, who plays as a forward for WFC Lanchkhuti and the Georgia women's national team.

== Club career ==
Bolkvadze transferred to Altay S.K. in İzmir, Turkey to play in the Turkcell Super League.

== International career ==
Bolkvadze capped for Georgia at senior level during the UEFA Women's Euro 2022 qualifying.

== International goals ==
No.	Date	Venue	Opponent	Score	Result	Competition
1.	11 June 2021	GFF Training Center Basa, Tbilisi, Georgia	Azerbaijan	3–2	3–1	Friendly
