= Teona Sukhashvili =

Georgian footballer (born 1994)

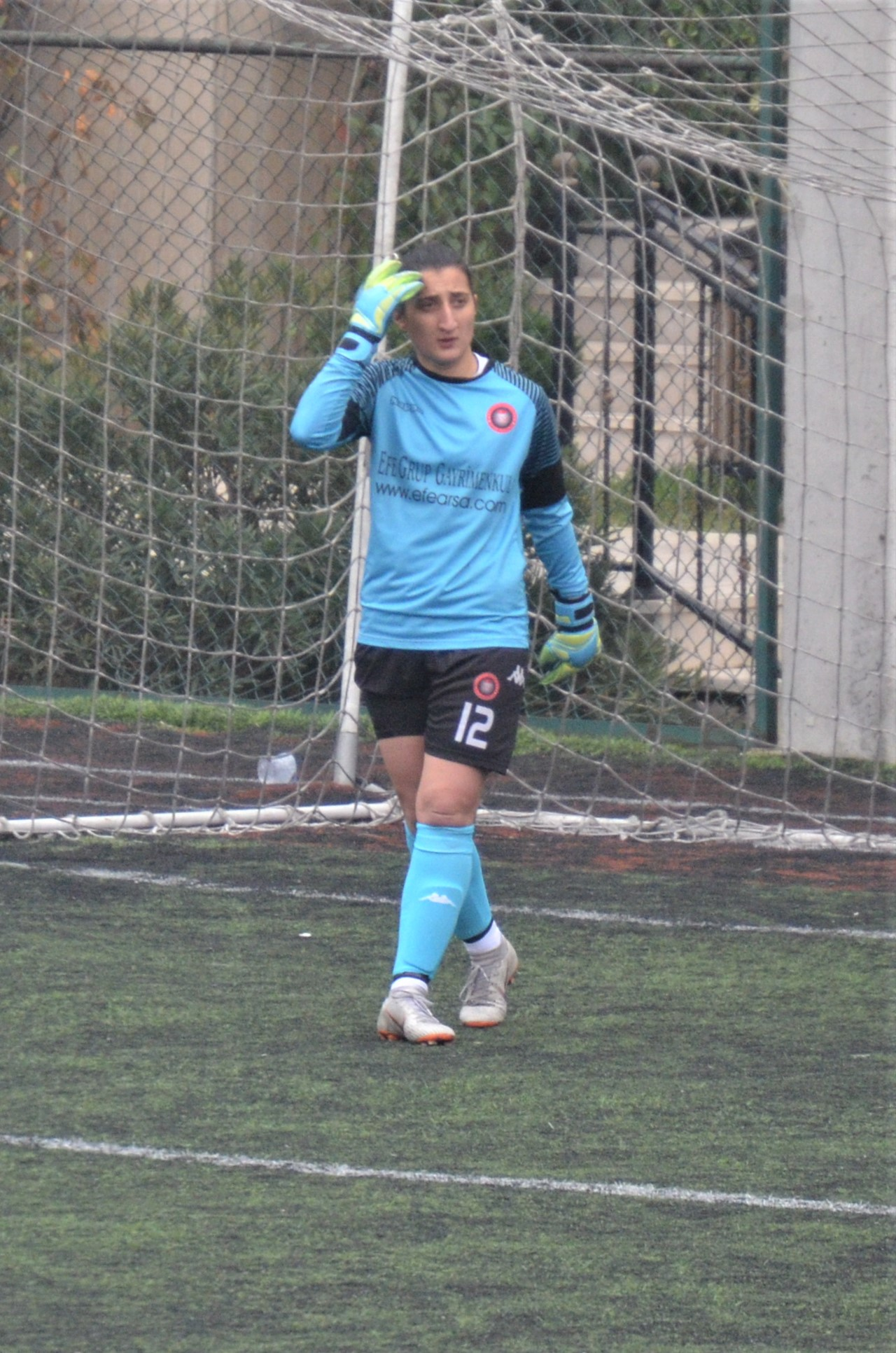
- Teona Sukhashvili of Fatih Vatan Spor in the 2019-20 Turkish Women's First Football League.

Personal information
- Date of birth: February 6, 1994 (age 32)
- Place of birth: Lagodekhi, Kakheti, Georgia
- Position: Goalkeeper

Team information
- Current team: WFC Lanchkhuti

Senior career*
Years	Team	Apps	(Gls)
2016–2019	Kdz. Ereğlispor	24	(0)
2019–2020	Fatih Vatan Spor	13	(0)
2021–2022	Sivasspor	6	(0)
2022–	WFC Lanchkhuti		

International career^{‡}
	Georgia	3	(0)
- * Club domestic league appearances and goals as of 16 January 2022 ‡ National team caps and goals as of 11 April 2016

Teona Sukhashvili (Georgian: თეონა სუხაშვილი, born February 6, 1994) is a Georgian football goalkeeper, who plays for WFC Lanchkhuti in the Georgia women's football championship, and the Georgian national team.

== Playing career ==
=== Club ===
Sukhashvili moved to Turkey and joined Kdz. Ereğlispor to play in the Turkish Women's First Football League in November 2016. She capped in 24 matches in three seasons.

By October 2019, she transferred to the Istanbul-based club Fatih Vatan Spor.

She joined the newly established club Sivasspor to play in the 2021–22 Turkcell Super League.

=== International ===
Sukhashvili was admitted to the Georgia women's national football team and took part at three matches of the 2019 FIFA Women's World Cup qualification – UEFA preliminary round Group 1 at Tbilisi, Georgia in April 2017.

== Career statistics ==
As of 16 January 2022.

Club	Season	League			Continental		National		Total	
Club	Season	Division	Apps	Goals	Apps	Goals	Apps	Goals	Apps	Goals
Kdz. Ereğlispor	2016–17	First League	21	0	–	–	3	0	24	0
Kdz. Ereğlispor	2017–18	First League	1	0	–	–	0	0	1	0
Kdz. Ereğlispor	2018–19	First League	2	0	–	–	0	0	2	0
Kdz. Ereğlispor	Total		24	0	–	–	3	0	27	0
Fatih Vatan Spor	2019–20	First League	13	0	–	–	0	0	13	0
Fatih Vatan Spor	Total		13	0	–	–	0	0	13	0
Sivasspor	2021–22	Super League	6	0	–	–	0	0	6	0
Sivasspor	Total		6	0	–	–	0	0	6	0
Career total			43	0	–	–	3	0	46	0
