= UEFA Women's Champions League clubs performance comparison =

Comparison of UEFA Women's Champions League club performances

The comparison of the performances of all clubs that participated in the UEFA Women's Cup and its successor, the UEFA Women's Champions League, is presented below. The qualifying rounds are not taken into account. Season-by-season stage classifications are based on UEFA's competition history archive.

For the UEFA Women's Cup era (2001–02 to 2008–09), group-stage mini-tournaments that served to qualify clubs for the quarter-finals are treated as qualifying and are excluded from this comparison. Only the knockout phase from the quarter-finals onward is counted for those seasons. From 2009–10 onward, the qualifying rounds are excluded and the competition proper is counted from its first non-qualifying stage. Club identities follow UEFA's current historical presentation where predecessor and successor records are treated as one club history. (Note: This affects, among others, records currently presented by UEFA under the identities of Eintracht Frankfurt, Paris FC, BK Häcken, Rosenborg and Rosengård.)

== Classification ==
Code	Classification
C	Champions
F	Runners-up
SF	Semi-finals
QF	Quarter-finals
R16	Round of 16
R32	Round of 32
KO	Knockout phase play-offs
GS	Group stage
LP	League phase
•	Did not participate

== Performance ==
Countries are ranked by total number of participations, then by the number of different participating clubs, and then alphabetically. Clubs are ranked by number of participations, then by titles, runner-up finishes, semi-final appearances, quarter-final appearances, and finally alphabetically.

The 2026–27 figures are provisional as of 2 September 2026, with all 18 teams which qualified for the league phase being left blank.

#	Clubs (# of participations)	01–02	02–03	03–04	04–05	05–06	06–07	07–08	08–09	09–10	10–11	11–12	12–13	13–14	14–15	15–16	16–17	17–18	18–19	19–20	20–21	21–22	22–23	23–24	24–25	25–26	26–27
(Germany)	GERMANY (49)	(1)	(1)	(1)	(1)	(2)	(2)	(1)	(2)	(3)	(2)	(2)	(2)	(2)	(2)	(3)	(2)	(2)	(2)	(2)	(2)	(3)	(2)	(2)	(2)	(2)	(1)
1	VfL Wolfsburg (13)	•	•	•	•	•	•	•	•	•	•	•	C	C	SF	F	QF	F	QF	F	QF	SF	F	•	QF	QF	•
2	Bayern Munich (13)	•	•	•	•	•	•	•	•	R16	•	•	•	•	•	R32	QF	R32	SF	QF	SF	QF	QF	GS	QF	SF	
3	Eintracht Frankfurt (11)	C	SF	F	•	C	QF	C	QF	•	•	F	•	•	C	SF	•	•	•	•	•	•	•	GS	•	•	•
4	Turbine Potsdam (8)	•	•	•	C	F	QF	•	•	C	F	SF	R16	SF	•	•	•	•	•	•	•	•	•	•	•	•	•
5	FCR 2001 Duisburg (3)	•	•	•	•	•	•	•	C	SF	SF	•	•	•	•	•	•	•	•	•	•	•	•	•	•	•	•
6	Hoffenheim (1)	•	•	•	•	•	•	•	•	•	•	•	•	•	•	•	•	•	•	•	•	GS	•	•	•	•	•
(England)	ENGLAND (46)	(1)	(1)	(1)	(1)	(1)	(1)	(1)	(1)	(2)	(2)	(2)	(2)	(2)	(2)	(2)	(2)	(2)	(2)	(2)	(2)	(2)	(2)	(1)	(3)	(3)	(3)
1	Arsenal (18)	QF	SF	•	SF	QF	C	QF	QF	QF	SF	SF	SF	QF	•	•	•	•	•	QF	•	QF	SF	•	C	SF	
2	Chelsea (11)	•	•	•	•	•	•	•	•	•	•	•	•	•	•	R16	R32	SF	SF	•	F	GS	SF	SF	SF	QF	
3	Manchester City (7)	•	•	•	•	•	•	•	•	•	•	•	•	•	•	•	SF	SF	R32	R16	QF	•	•	•	QF	•	
4	Birmingham City (2)	•	•	•	•	•	•	•	•	•	•	•	R32	SF	•	•	•	•	•	•	•	•	•	•	•	•	•
5	Bristol City (2)	•	•	•	•	•	•	•	•	•	•	R32	•	•	QF	•	•	•	•	•	•	•	•	•	•	•	•
6	Everton (2)	•	•	•	•	•	•	•	•	R32	QF	•	•	•	•	•	•	•	•	•	•	•	•	•	•	•	•
7	Liverpool (2)	•	•	•	•	•	•	•	•	•	•	•	•	•	R32	R32	•	•	•	•	•	•	•	•	•	•	•
8	Fulham (1)	•	•	QF	•	•	•	•	•	•	•	•	•	•	•	•	•	•	•	•	•	•	•	•	•	•	•
9	Manchester United (1)	•	•	•	•	•	•	•	•	•	•	•	•	•	•	•	•	•	•	•	•	•	•	•	•	QF	•
(France)	FRANCE (43)	(1)	(1)	(0)	(0)	(1)	(0)	(1)	(1)	(2)	(2)	(2)	(2)	(2)	(2)	(2)	(2)	(2)	(2)	(2)	(2)	(2)	(2)	(3)	(1)	(3)	(3)
1	OL Lyonnes (20)	•	•	•	•	•	•	SF	SF	F	C	C	F	R16	R16	C	C	C	C	C	QF	C	QF	F	SF	F	
2	Paris Saint-Germain (13)	•	•	•	•	•	•	•	•	•	•	R16	•	R32	F	SF	F	•	QF	SF	SF	SF	QF	SF	•	LP	
3	Paris FC (5)	•	•	•	•	•	•	•	•	•	QF	•	SF	•	•	•	•	•	•	•	•	•	•	GS	•	KO	
4	Montpellier (3)	•	•	•	•	SF	•	•	•	QF	•	•	•	•	•	•	•	QF	•	•	•	•	•	•	•	•	•
5	Toulouse (2)	SF	QF	•	•	•	•	•	•	•	•	•	•	•	•	•	•	•	•	•	•	•	•	•	•	•	•
(Sweden)	SWEDEN (39)	(1)	(1)	(2)	(2)	(1)	(1)	(1)	(1)	(2)	(1)	(2)	(2)	(2)	(2)	(2)	(2)	(2)	(2)	(2)	(2)	(1)	(1)	(2)	(1)	(0)	(1)
1	Rosengård (12)	•	•	SF	•	•	•	•	•	•	•	QF	QF	R16	QF	QF	QF	R16	R16	•	QF	•	GS	GS	•	•	•
2	Umeå (8)	F	C	C	QF	•	F	F	SF	SF	•	•	•	•	•	•	•	•	•	•	•	•	•	•	•	•	•
3	BK Häcken (7)	•	•	•	•	•	•	•	•	•	•	QF	QF	•	•	•	•	•	•	R32	R32	GS	•	QF	•	•	
4	Linköping (5)	•	•	•	•	•	•	•	•	R16	QF	•	•	•	QF	•	•	QF	R16	•	•	•	•	•	•	•	•
5	Djurgården (2)	•	•	•	F	SF	•	•	•	•	•	•	•	•	•	•	•	•	•	•	•	•	•	•	•	•	•
6	Tyresö (1)	•	•	•	•	•	•	•	•	•	•	•	•	F	•	•	•	•	•	•	•	•	•	•	•	•	•
7	Eskilstuna (1)	•	•	•	•	•	•	•	•	•	•	•	•	•	•	•	R16	•	•	•	•	•	•	•	•	•	•
8	Hammarby (1)	•	•	•	•	•	•	•	•	•	•	•	•	•	•	•	•	•	•	•	•	•	•	•	GS	•	•
9	Örebro (1)	•	•	•	•	•	•	•	•	•	•	•	•	•	•	R16	•	•	•	•	•	•	•	•	•	•	•
10	Piteå (1)	•	•	•	•	•	•	•	•	•	•	•	•	•	•	•	•	•	•	R32	•	•	•	•	•	•	•
(Italy)	ITALY (38)	(0)	(0)	(0)	(1)	(0)	(0)	(1)	(1)	(2)	(2)	(2)	(2)	(2)	(2)	(2)	(2)	(2)	(2)	(2)	(2)	(1)	(2)	(1)	(2)	(2)	(3)
1	Juventus (8)	•	•	•	•	•	•	•	•	•	•	•	•	•	•	•	•	•	R32	R32	R32	QF	GS	•	GS	KO	
2	Verona (7)	•	•	•	•	•	•	SF	QF	R32	R32	•	R16	•	•	R16	R32	•	•	•	•	•	•	•	•	•	•
3	Torres (7)	•	•	•	QF	•	•	•	•	QF	R16	R16	QF	QF	R16	•	•	•	•	•	•	•	•	•	•	•	•
4	Roma (5)	•	•	•	•	•	•	•	•	•	•	•	•	•	•	•	•	•	•	•	•	•	QF	GS	GS	LP	
5	Brescia (4)	•	•	•	•	•	•	•	•	•	•	•	•	•	R32	QF	R16	R16	•	•	•	•	•	•	•	•	•
6	Fiorentina (4)	•	•	•	•	•	•	•	•	•	•	•	•	•	•	•	•	R16	R16	R32	R16	•	•	•	•	•	•
7	Tavagnacco (2)	•	•	•	•	•	•	•	•	•	•	R32	•	R32	•	•	•	•	•	•	•	•	•	•	•	•	•
8	Inter Milan (1)	•	•	•	•	•	•	•	•	•	•	•	•	•	•	•	•	•	•	•	•	•	•	•	•	•	
(Denmark)	DENMARK (33)	(1)	(1)	(1)	(0)	(1)	(1)	(1)	(1)	(2)	(2)	(2)	(2)	(2)	(2)	(2)	(2)	(2)	(2)	(2)	(2)	(1)	(0)	(0)	(0)	(0)	(1)
1	Brøndby (17)	•	•	SF	•	QF	SF	QF	QF	R16	R16	QF	R32	R32	SF	R32	R16	R32	R16	R16	R16	•	•	•	•	•	•
2	Fortuna Hjørring (13)	•	F	•	•	•	•	•	•	R16	R16	R16	R16	R16	R16	R16	QF	R32	R32	R16	R16	•	•	•	•	•	•
3	HB Køge (2)	•	•	•	•	•	•	•	•	•	•	•	•	•	•	•	•	•	•	•	•	GS	•	•	•	•	
4	Odense Q (1)	QF	•	•	•	•	•	•	•	•	•	•	•	•	•	•	•	•	•	•	•	•	•	•	•	•	•
(Spain)	SPAIN (31)	(0)	(0)	(0)	(0)	(0)	(0)	(0)	(0)	(1)	(1)	(1)	(1)	(1)	(1)	(2)	(2)	(2)	(2)	(2)	(2)	(2)	(2)	(2)	(2)	(3)	(2)
1	Barcelona (15)	•	•	•	•	•	•	•	•	•	•	•	R32	QF	R16	QF	SF	QF	F	SF	C	F	C	C	F	C	
2	Atlético Madrid (6)	•	•	•	•	•	•	•	•	•	•	•	•	•	•	R16	•	R32	R16	QF	R16	•	•	•	•	KO	•
3	Real Madrid (6)	•	•	•	•	•	•	•	•	•	•	•	•	•	•	•	•	•	•	•	•	QF	GS	GS	QF	QF	
4	Rayo Vallecano (3)	•	•	•	•	•	•	•	•	R32	R16	R16	•	•	•	•	•	•	•	•	•	•	•	•	•	•	•
5	Athletic Bilbao (1)	•	•	•	•	•	•	•	•	•	•	•	•	•	•	•	R32	•	•	•	•	•	•	•	•	•	•
(Russia)	RUSSIA (28)	(1)	(1)	(1)	(1)	(0)	(0)	(1)	(1)	(2)	(2)	(2)	(2)	(2)	(2)	(2)	(2)	(2)	(2)	(2)	(0)	(0)	(0)	(0)	(0)	(0)	(0)
1	Zvezda-2005 (8)	•	•	•	•	•	•	•	F	R16	QF	•	•	•	R16	R16	R32	R32	R32	•	•	•	•	•	•	•	•
2	Rossiyanka (8)	•	•	•	•	•	•	QF	•	R16	R16	QF	QF	R16	•	•	R16	R32	•	•	•	•	•	•	•	•	•
3	Ryazan-VDV (4)	QF	•	•	•	•	•	•	•	•	•	•	•	•	R32	•	•	•	R32	R32	•	•	•	•	•	•	•
4	Voronezh (3)	•	•	QF	QF	•	•	•	•	•	•	R16	•	•	•	•	•	•	•	•	•	•	•	•	•	•	•
5	Zorky (3)	•	•	•	•	•	•	•	•	•	•	•	R16	R16	•	R32	•	•	•	•	•	•	•	•	•	•	•
6	CSK VVS Samara (1)	•	QF	•	•	•	•	•	•	•	•	•	•	•	•	•	•	•	•	•	•	•	•	•	•	•	•
7	Chertanovo (1)	•	•	•	•	•	•	•	•	•	•	•	•	•	•	•	•	•	•	R32	•	•	•	•	•	•	•
(Norway)	NORWAY (24)	(1)	(1)	(1)	(1)	(0)	(1)	(0)	(0)	(1)	(1)	(1)	(2)	(1)	(1)	(1)	(2)	(2)	(2)	(0)	(2)	(0)	(0)	(1)	(1)	(1)	(0)
1	LSK Kvinner (6)	•	•	•	•	•	•	•	•	•	•	•	•	R32	•	R16	R32	R16	QF	•	R16	•	•	•	•	•	•
2	Rosenborg (3)	QF	QF	•	SF	•	•	•	•	•	•	•	•	•	•	•	•	•	•	•	•	•	•	•	•	•	•
3	Røa (3)	•	•	•	•	•	•	•	•	QF	R16	•	R16	•	•	•	•	•	•	•	•	•	•	•	•	•	•
4	Avaldsnes (3)	•	•	•	•	•	•	•	•	•	•	•	•	•	•	•	R32	R32	R32	•	•	•	•	•	•	•	•
5	Stabæk (3)	•	•	•	•	•	•	•	•	•	•	R32	R16	•	R32	•	•	•	•	•	•	•	•	•	•	•	•
6	Vålerenga (3)	•	•	•	•	•	•	•	•	•	•	•	•	•	•	•	•	•	•	•	R32	•	•	•	GS	LP	•
7	Kolbotn (2)	•	•	QF	•	•	SF	•	•	•	•	•	•	•	•	•	•	•	•	•	•	•	•	•	•	•	•
8	Brann (1)	•	•	•	•	•	•	•	•	•	•	•	•	•	•	•	•	•	•	•	•	•	•	QF	•	•	•
(Czech Republic)	CZECH REPUBLIC (21)	(0)	(0)	(0)	(0)	(1)	(0)	(0)	(0)	(1)	(1)	(1)	(1)	(1)	(2)	(1)	(2)	(2)	(2)	(2)	(2)	(0)	(1)	(1)	(0)	(0)	(0)
1	Sparta Prague (12)	•	•	•	•	QF	•	•	•	R16	R16	R16	R16	R32	R32	•	R32	R16	R32	R32	R16	•	•	•	•	•	•
2	Slavia Prague (9)	•	•	•	•	•	•	•	•	•	•	•	•	•	R32	QF	R16	QF	QF	R16	R32	•	GS	GS	•	•	•
(Austria)	AUSTRIA (19)	(0)	(0)	(0)	(0)	(0)	(0)	(0)	(0)	(1)	(1)	(1)	(1)	(2)	(1)	(1)	(2)	(1)	(1)	(1)	(1)	(0)	(1)	(1)	(1)	(1)	(1)
1	St. Pölten (11)	•	•	•	•	•	•	•	•	•	•	•	•	R32	•	R32	R32	R32	R32	R32	R16	•	GS	GS	GS	LP	•
2	Neulengbach (6)	•	•	•	•	•	•	•	•	R16	R16	R16	R32	QF	R16	•	•	•	•	•	•	•	•	•	•	•	•
3	Sturm Graz (1)	•	•	•	•	•	•	•	•	•	•	•	•	•	•	•	R32	•	•	•	•	•	•	•	•	•	•
4	Austria Vienna (1)	•	•	•	•	•	•	•	•	•	•	•	•	•	•	•	•	•	•	•	•	•	•	•	•	•	
(Netherlands)	NETHERLANDS (17)	(0)	(0)	(0)	(0)	(0)	(1)	(0)	(0)	(1)	(1)	(1)	(1)	(1)	(1)	(1)	(1)	(1)	(1)	(1)	(2)	(0)	(0)	(1)	(1)	(1)	(0)
1	Twente (8)	•	•	•	•	•	•	•	•	•	•	R32	•	R32	R32	R16	R16	•	•	R16	•	•	•	•	GS	LP	•
2	Ajax (4)	•	•	•	•	•	•	•	•	•	•	•	•	•	•	•	•	R32	R16	•	R32	•	•	QF	•	•	•
3	AZ (2)	•	•	•	•	•	•	•	•	R32	R32	•	•	•	•	•	•	•	•	•	•	•	•	•	•	•	•
4	Saestum (1)	•	•	•	•	•	QF	•	•	•	•	•	•	•	•	•	•	•	•	•	•	•	•	•	•	•	•
5	Den Haag (1)	•	•	•	•	•	•	•	•	•	•	•	R32	•	•	•	•	•	•	•	•	•	•	•	•	•	•
6	PSV (1)	•	•	•	•	•	•	•	•	•	•	•	•	•	•	•	•	•	•	•	R32	•	•	•	•	•	•
(Switzerland)	SWITZERLAND (17)	(0)	(0)	(0)	(0)	(0)	(0)	(0)	(0)	(1)	(1)	(1)	(1)	(1)	(1)	(1)	(1)	(1)	(1)	(2)	(2)	(1)	(1)	(0)	(0)	(0)	(1)
1	Zürich (12)	•	•	•	•	•	•	•	•	R32	R32	•	R32	R16	R16	R32	R16	R32	R16	R32	R32	•	GS	•	•	•	•
2	Servette (3)	•	•	•	•	•	•	•	•	•	•	•	•	•	•	•	•	•	•	•	R32	GS	•	•	•	•	
3	Lugano (1)	•	•	•	•	•	•	•	•	•	•	•	•	•	•	•	•	•	•	R32	•	•	•	•	•	•	•
4	Young Boys (1)	•	•	•	•	•	•	•	•	•	•	R32	•	•	•	•	•	•	•	•	•	•	•	•	•	•	•
(Iceland)	ICELAND (16)	(0)	(0)	(0)	(0)	(1)	(1)	(0)	(0)	(1)	(2)	(2)	(1)	(1)	(1)	(1)	(1)	(1)	(1)	(1)	(0)	(1)	(0)	(0)	(0)	(0)	(0)
1	Breiðablik (5)	•	•	•	•	•	QF	•	•	•	R32	•	•	•	•	•	R32	•	•	R16	•	GS	•	•	•	•	•
2	Valur (4)	•	•	•	•	QF	•	•	•	R32	R32	R32	•	•	•	•	•	•	•	•	•	•	•	•	•	•	•
3	Stjarnan (4)	•	•	•	•	•	•	•	•	•	•	•	R32	•	R32	R32	•	R16	•	•	•	•	•	•	•	•	•
4	Þór/KA (3)	•	•	•	•	•	•	•	•	•	•	R32	•	R32	•	•	•	•	R32	•	•	•	•	•	•	•	•
(Scotland)	SCOTLAND (13)	(0)	(0)	(0)	(0)	(0)	(0)	(0)	(0)	(0)	(0)	(1)	(1)	(1)	(1)	(1)	(2)	(1)	(1)	(2)	(1)	(0)	(0)	(0)	(1)	(0)	(0)
1	Glasgow City (10)	•	•	•	•	•	•	•	•	•	•	R16	R32	R16	QF	R32	R32	R32	R16	QF	R32	•	•	•	•	•	•
2	Hibernian (2)	•	•	•	•	•	•	•	•	•	•	•	•	•	•	•	R32	•	•	R32	•	•	•	•	•	•	•
3	Celtic (1)	•	•	•	•	•	•	•	•	•	•	•	•	•	•	•	•	•	•	•	•	•	•	•	GS	•	•
(Kazakhstan)	KAZAKHSTAN (12)	(0)	(0)	(0)	(0)	(0)	(0)	(0)	(0)	(1)	(1)	(1)	(1)	(1)	(1)	(1)	(1)	(1)	(1)	(1)	(1)	(0)	(0)	(0)	(0)	(0)	(0)
1	BIIK-Shymkent (9)	•	•	•	•	•	•	•	•	R32	•	•	R32	•	R32	R32	R16	R16	R32	R16	R16	•	•	•	•	•	•
2	CSHVSM-Kairat (3)	•	•	•	•	•	•	•	•	•	R32	R32	•	R32	•	•	•	•	•	•	•	•	•	•	•	•	•
(Belgium)	BELGIUM (10)	(0)	(0)	(0)	(0)	(0)	(0)	(1)	(0)	(1)	(1)	(1)	(1)	(1)	(0)	(1)	(0)	(0)	(0)	(1)	(0)	(0)	(0)	(0)	(0)	(1)	(1)
1	Standard Liège (5)	•	•	•	•	•	•	•	•	R32	•	R32	R32	R32	•	R32	•	•	•	•	•	•	•	•	•	•	•
2	OH Leuven (2)	•	•	•	•	•	•	•	•	•	•	•	•	•	•	•	•	•	•	•	•	•	•	•	•	KO	
3	FCL Rapide Wezemaal (1)	•	•	•	•	•	•	QF	•	•	•	•	•	•	•	•	•	•	•	•	•	•	•	•	•	•	•
4	Anderlecht (1)	•	•	•	•	•	•	•	•	•	•	•	•	•	•	•	•	•	•	R32	•	•	•	•	•	•	•
5	Sint-Truidense (1)	•	•	•	•	•	•	•	•	•	R32	•	•	•	•	•	•	•	•	•	•	•	•	•	•	•	•
(Belarus)	BELARUS (9)	(0)	(0)	(0)	(1)	(0)	(0)	(0)	(0)	(1)	(1)	(1)	(0)	(0)	(0)	(1)	(1)	(1)	(0)	(1)	(1)	(0)	(0)	(0)	(0)	(0)	(0)
1	Minsk (5)	•	•	•	•	•	•	•	•	•	•	•	•	•	•	R32	R32	R32	•	R16	R32	•	•	•	•	•	•
2	Bobruichanka (2)	•	•	•	QF	•	•	•	•	•	•	R32	•	•	•	•	•	•	•	•	•	•	•	•	•	•	•
3	SKA-1938 (1)	•	•	•	•	•	•	•	•	•	R32	•	•	•	•	•	•	•	•	•	•	•	•	•	•	•	•
4	Universitet (1)	•	•	•	•	•	•	•	•	R32	•	•	•	•	•	•	•	•	•	•	•	•	•	•	•	•	•
(Finland)	FINLAND (9)	(1)	(1)	(0)	(0)	(0)	(0)	(0)	(0)	(1)	(1)	(1)	(1)	(1)	(0)	(1)	(0)	(0)	(1)	(0)	(0)	(0)	(0)	(0)	(0)	(0)	(0)
1	PK-35 Vantaa (4)	•	•	•	•	•	•	•	•	•	•	R32	R32	R32	•	R32	•	•	•	•	•	•	•	•	•	•	•
2	HJK (2)	SF	QF	•	•	•	•	•	•	•	•	•	•	•	•	•	•	•	•	•	•	•	•	•	•	•	•
3	Honka (2)	•	•	•	•	•	•	•	•	R32	•	•	•	•	•	•	•	•	R32	•	•	•	•	•	•	•	•
4	Åland (1)	•	•	•	•	•	•	•	•	•	R32	•	•	•	•	•	•	•	•	•	•	•	•	•	•	•	•
(Poland)	POLAND (9)	(0)	(0)	(0)	(0)	(0)	(0)	(0)	(0)	(1)	(1)	(0)	(1)	(1)	(1)	(1)	(1)	(1)	(0)	(0)	(1)	(0)	(0)	(0)	(0)	(0)	(0)
1	Medyk (4)	•	•	•	•	•	•	•	•	•	•	•	•	•	R32	R32	R32	R32	•	•	•	•	•	•	•	•	•
2	Unia Racibórz (4)	•	•	•	•	•	•	•	•	R32	R32	•	R32	R32	•	•	•	•	•	•	•	•	•	•	•	•	•
3	Górnik Łęczna (1)	•	•	•	•	•	•	•	•	•	•	•	•	•	•	•	•	•	•	•	R32	•	•	•	•	•	•
(Portugal)	PORTUGAL (8)	(0)	(0)	(0)	(0)	(0)	(0)	(0)	(0)	(0)	(0)	(0)	(0)	(0)	(1)	(0)	(0)	(0)	(0)	(1)	(1)	(1)	(1)	(1)	(0)	(1)	(1)
1	Benfica (6)	•	•	•	•	•	•	•	•	•	•	•	•	•	•	•	•	•	•	•	R32	GS	GS	QF	•	LP	
2	Braga (1)	•	•	•	•	•	•	•	•	•	•	•	•	•	•	•	•	•	•	R32	•	•	•	•	•	•	•
3	Ouriense (1)	•	•	•	•	•	•	•	•	•	•	•	•	•	R32	•	•	•	•	•	•	•	•	•	•	•	•
(Cyprus)	CYPRUS (8)	(0)	(0)	(0)	(0)	(0)	(0)	(0)	(0)	(0)	(1)	(1)	(1)	(1)	(1)	(0)	(1)	(1)	(1)	(0)	(0)	(0)	(0)	(0)	(0)	(0)	(0)
1	Apollon Ladies (7)	•	•	•	•	•	•	•	•	•	R32	R32	R32	R32	R32	•	R32	R32	•	•	•	•	•	•	•	•	•
2	Somatio Barcelona (1)	•	•	•	•	•	•	•	•	•	•	•	•	•	•	•	•	•	R32	•	•	•	•	•	•	•	•
(Serbia)	SERBIA (8)	(0)	(0)	(0)	(0)	(0)	(0)	(0)	(0)	(1)	(1)	(0)	(1)	(1)	(0)	(1)	(0)	(0)	(1)	(1)	(1)	(0)	(0)	(0)	(0)	(0)	(0)
1	Spartak Subotica (6)	•	•	•	•	•	•	•	•	•	•	•	R32	R32	•	R32	•	•	R32	R32	R32	•	•	•	•	•	•
2	Mašinac (2)	•	•	•	•	•	•	•	•	R32	R32	•	•	•	•	•	•	•	•	•	•	•	•	•	•	•	•
(Ukraine)	UKRAINE (5)	(0)	(0)	(0)	(0)	(0)	(0)	(0)	(0)	(1)	(1)	(0)	(0)	(0)	(0)	(0)	(0)	(0)	(1)	(0)	(1)	(1)	(0)	(0)	(0)	(0)	(0)
1	Metalist 1925 (3)	•	•	•	•	•	•	•	•	R32	•	•	•	•	•	•	•	•	R32	•	•	GS	•	•	•	•	•
2	Legenda Chernigiv (1)	•	•	•	•	•	•	•	•	•	R32	•	•	•	•	•	•	•	•	•	•	•	•	•	•	•	•
3	Vorskla Poltava (1)	•	•	•	•	•	•	•	•	•	•	•	•	•	•	•	•	•	•	•	R32	•	•	•	•	•	•
(Hungary)	HUNGARY (5)	(0)	(0)	(0)	(0)	(0)	(0)	(0)	(0)	(1)	(1)	(0)	(1)	(1)	(1)	(0)	(0)	(0)	(0)	(0)	(0)	(0)	(0)	(0)	(0)	(0)	(0)
1	MTK (4)	•	•	•	•	•	•	•	•	•	R32	•	R32	R32	R32	•	•	•	•	•	•	•	•	•	•	•	•
2	Haladás (1)	•	•	•	•	•	•	•	•	R32	•	•	•	•	•	•	•	•	•	•	•	•	•	•	•	•	•
(Bosnia and Herzegovina)	BOSNIA AND HERZEGOVINA (4)	(0)	(0)	(0)	(0)	(0)	(0)	(0)	(0)	(1)	(0)	(0)	(1)	(0)	(0)	(0)	(1)	(0)	(1)	(0)	(0)	(0)	(0)	(0)	(0)	(0)	(0)
1	Sarajevo (4)	•	•	•	•	•	•	•	•	R32	•	•	R32	•	•	•	R32	•	R32	•	•	•	•	•	•	•	•
(Greece)	GREECE (4)	(0)	(0)	(0)	(0)	(0)	(0)	(0)	(0)	(1)	(1)	(0)	(0)	(0)	(0)	(1)	(0)	(1)	(0)	(0)	(0)	(0)	(0)	(0)	(0)	(0)	(0)
1	PAOK (4)	•	•	•	•	•	•	•	•	R32	R32	•	•	•	•	R32	•	R32	•	•	•	•	•	•	•	•	•
(Romania)	ROMANIA (4)	(0)	(0)	(0)	(0)	(0)	(0)	(0)	(0)	(0)	(0)	(1)	(1)	(0)	(0)	(1)	(0)	(1)	(0)	(0)	(0)	(0)	(0)	(0)	(0)	(0)	(0)
1	Olimpia Cluj (4)	•	•	•	•	•	•	•	•	•	•	R32	R16	•	•	R32	•	R32	•	•	•	•	•	•	•	•	•
(Slovenia)	SLOVENIA (3)	(0)	(0)	(0)	(0)	(0)	(0)	(0)	(0)	(0)	(1)	(0)	(0)	(0)	(1)	(0)	(0)	(0)	(0)	(0)	(1)	(0)	(0)	(0)	(0)	(0)	(0)
1	Mura (2)	•	•	•	•	•	•	•	•	•	•	•	•	•	R32	•	•	•	•	•	R32	•	•	•	•	•	•
2	Krka (1)	•	•	•	•	•	•	•	•	•	R32	•	•	•	•	•	•	•	•	•	•	•	•	•	•	•	•
(Lithuania)	LITHUANIA (3)	(0)	(0)	(0)	(0)	(0)	(0)	(0)	(0)	(0)	(0)	(0)	(0)	(0)	(1)	(0)	(0)	(1)	(1)	(0)	(0)	(0)	(0)	(0)	(0)	(0)	(0)
1	Gintra (3)	•	•	•	•	•	•	•	•	•	•	•	•	•	R16	•	•	R16	R32	•	•	•	•	•	•	•	•
(Republic of Ireland)	REPUBLIC OF IRELAND (2)	(0)	(0)	(0)	(0)	(0)	(0)	(0)	(0)	(0)	(0)	(1)	(0)	(0)	(1)	(0)	(0)	(0)	(0)	(0)	(0)	(0)	(0)	(0)	(0)	(0)	(0)
1	Peamount (1)	•	•	•	•	•	•	•	•	•	•	R32	•	•	•	•	•	•	•	•	•	•	•	•	•	•	•
2	Raheny (1)	•	•	•	•	•	•	•	•	•	•	•	•	•	R32	•	•	•	•	•	•	•	•	•	•	•	•
(Turkey)	TURKEY (2)	(0)	(0)	(0)	(0)	(0)	(0)	(0)	(0)	(0)	(0)	(0)	(0)	(1)	(0)	(0)	(0)	(0)	(0)	(0)	(0)	(0)	(0)	(0)	(1)	(0)	(0)
1	Galatasaray (1)	•	•	•	•	•	•	•	•	•	•	•	•	•	•	•	•	•	•	•	•	•	•	•	GS	•	•
2	Konak (1)	•	•	•	•	•	•	•	•	•	•	•	•	R16	•	•	•	•	•	•	•	•	•	•	•	•	•
(Albania)	ALBANIA (2)	(0)	(0)	(0)	(0)	(0)	(0)	(0)	(0)	(0)	(0)	(0)	(0)	(0)	(0)	(0)	(0)	(0)	(0)	(1)	(0)	(0)	(1)	(0)	(0)	(0)	(0)
1	Vllaznia (2)	•	•	•	•	•	•	•	•	•	•	•	•	•	•	•	•	•	•	R32	•	•	GS	•	•	•	•
(Croatia)	CROATIA (2)	(0)	(0)	(0)	(0)	(0)	(0)	(0)	(0)	(0)	(0)	(1)	(0)	(0)	(1)	(0)	(0)	(0)	(0)	(0)	(0)	(0)	(0)	(0)	(0)	(0)	(0)
1	Osijek (2)	•	•	•	•	•	•	•	•	•	•	R32	•	•	R32	•	•	•	•	•	•	•	•	•	•	•	•
(Azerbaijan)	AZERBAIJAN (1)	(0)	(0)	(1)	(0)	(0)	(0)	(0)	(0)	(0)	(0)	(0)	(0)	(0)	(0)	(0)	(0)	(0)	(0)	(0)	(0)	(0)	(0)	(0)	(0)	(0)	(0)
1	Gömrükçü Baku (1)	•	•	QF	•	•	•	•	•	•	•	•	•	•	•	•	•	•	•	•	•	•	•	•	•	•	•
(Estonia)	ESTONIA (1)	(0)	(0)	(0)	(0)	(0)	(0)	(0)	(0)	(0)	(0)	(0)	(0)	(1)	(0)	(0)	(0)	(0)	(0)	(0)	(0)	(0)	(0)	(0)	(0)	(0)	(0)
1	Pärnu (1)	•	•	•	•	•	•	•	•	•	•	•	•	R32	•	•	•	•	•	•	•	•	•	•	•	•	•
(Georgia (country))	GEORGIA (1)	(0)	(0)	(0)	(0)	(0)	(0)	(0)	(0)	(0)	(0)	(0)	(0)	(0)	(0)	(0)	(0)	(0)	(0)	(0)	(1)	(0)	(0)	(0)	(0)	(0)	(0)
1	Lanchkhuti (1)	•	•	•	•	•	•	•	•	•	•	•	•	•	•	•	•	•	•	•	R32	•	•	•	•	•	•
(Israel)	ISRAEL (1)	(0)	(0)	(0)	(0)	(0)	(0)	(0)	(0)	(0)	(0)	(1)	(0)	(0)	(0)	(0)	(0)	(0)	(0)	(0)	(0)	(0)	(0)	(0)	(0)	(0)	(0)
1	ASA Tel Aviv (1)	•	•	•	•	•	•	•	•	•	•	R32	•	•	•	•	•	•	•	•	•	•	•	•	•	•	•
(Kosovo)	KOSOVO (1)	(0)	(0)	(0)	(0)	(0)	(0)	(0)	(0)	(0)	(0)	(0)	(0)	(0)	(0)	(0)	(0)	(0)	(0)	(1)	(0)	(0)	(0)	(0)	(0)	(0)	(0)
1	Mitrovica (1)	•	•	•	•	•	•	•	•	•	•	•	•	•	•	•	•	•	•	R32	•	•	•	•	•	•	•

== See also ==
- UEFA Women's Champions League
- List of UEFA Women's Cup and UEFA Women's Champions League records and statistics
- List of UEFA Women's Cup and Women's Champions League finals
- UEFA Women's Europa Cup clubs performance comparison
- UEFA Champions League clubs performance comparison
