= Mariam Kalandadze =

Georgian footballer (born 2000)

Personal information
- Date of birth: 19 December 2000 (age 25)
- Height: 1.71 m (5 ft 7 in)
- Position: Defender

Team information
- Current team: Panathinaikos
- Number: 21

Senior career*
Years	Team	Apps	(Gls)
2016–2025	Lanchkhuti		
2025–2026	Panathinaikos	23	(0)
2026–	Nike Lusso		

International career^{‡}
2016	Georgia U17	3	(0)
2019–	Georgia U19	9	(0)
2019–	Georgia	39	(1)
- * Club domestic league appearances and goals as of 4 June 2026 ‡ National team caps and goals as of 23:50, 31 August 2019 (UTC)

Mariam Kalandadze (born 19 December 2000) is a Georgian footballer who plays as a defender for Panathinaikos in the Greek A Divisionand has appeared for the Georgia women's national team.

== Career ==
Kalandadze has been capped for the Georgia national team, appearing for the team during the UEFA Women's Euro 2021 qualifying cycle.
