= Mariami Janikashvili =

Georgian footballer (born 2000)

Personal information
- Date of birth: 5 June 2000 (age 26)
- Position: Forward

Team information
- Current team: Sivasspor
- Number: 3

Senior career*
Years	Team	Apps	(Gls)
2021–	Sivasspor	6	(1)

International career
2017	Georgia U17	3	(0)
2018	Georgia U19	6	(0)
2018–2019	Georgia	3	(0)
- * Club domestic league appearances and goals as of 16 January 2022

Mariami Janikashvili (Georgian: მარიამი ჯანიკაშვილი; 5 June 2000 is a Georgian footballer, who plays as a forward for Sivasspor in the Turkish Women's Super league, and was a member of the Georgia women's national team.

== Club career ==
By December 2021, Janikashvili moved to Turkey and joined the newly established Turkish Super League club Sivasspor.

== International career ==
Janikashvili was a member of the Georgia U17, Georgia U19 and the Georgia national teams.
