= Sivasspor (women's football) =

- Full name: Sivasspor Kadın Futbol Takımı
- Founded: 2021; 4 years ago
- Ground: Sivas Cumhuriyet University Stadium, Artificial turf pitch
- Coordinates: 39.70391°N 37.02053°E
- President: Mecnun Otyakmaz
- Manager: (Turkey) Nevzat Ercanlı
- League: Turkish Women's Super League
Home colours	Away colours

Sivasspor women's football (Turkish: Sivasspor Kadın Futbol Takımı) is a Turkish women's football team as part of Sivasspor based in Sivas. They were founded in 2021. Also known as Bitexen Sivasspor, the club is sponsored by the securities company Bitexen.

== History ==
In 2021, the Turkish Football Federation appealed to the major clubs of the top-level men's football league of Süper Lig to help improve women's football in Turkey by founding their women's football sides. Sivasspor women's football team was established, and was approved to play in the newly-reconstructed league system of Turkish Women's Football Super League. The club president is Mecnun Otyakmaz, the technical director is Nevzat Ercanlı, and the coach is Adem Sarıtaş.

== Stadium ==
The team play their home matches at the artificial turf pitch of the Sivas Cumhuriyet University's stadium.

== Statistics ==
As of 9 March 2022

Season	League	Rank	Pld	W	D	L	GF	GA	GD	Pts
2021-22	Super League Gr. A	9 (^{1})	12	3	1	8	9	29	-10	10
Green marks a season followed by promotion, red a season followed by relegation.

- (^{1}) : Season in progress

== Current squad ==
As of 9 March 2022

- Head coach: (Turkey) Nevzat Ercanlı

Note: Flags indicate national team as defined under FIFA eligibility rules; some limited exceptions apply. Players may hold more than one non-FIFA nationality.

No.	Pos.	Nation	Player
1	GK	TUR	Ümmühan Susuz
2		TUR	Mısra Yıldız
3	FW	GEO	Mariami Janikashvili
4		TUR	Yağmur Çetin
5		TUR	İrem Yıldız
6		TUR	Yağmur Şimşek
7	MF	GEO	Megi Ejibia
8		TUR	Kader Şimşek
9		TUR	Figen Naçar
10		TUR	Mervenur Kılıçaslan
11		TUR	Tuğba Doğan
13		TUR	Yasemin Gül
17	GK	GEO	Teona Sukhashvili
18		TUR	Tülin Akpınar
19		TUR	Rana Gürlek

No.	Pos.	Nation	Player
21		TUR	Sümeyye Polat
22		TUR	Semra Sıla Gürgen
23	DF	TUR	Fatma Serdar
27		TUR	Nur Melisa Özdamar
33		USA	Skye Ambriel Gunn
44	DF	GEO	Nino Chkhartishvili
45	DF	NCA	Yorcelly Humphreys
49		TUR	Rojin Argun
52		TUR	Esra Güzlük]
58		TUR	Hatice Küçükyıldız
60		TUR	Ezgi Eyüboğlu
61		TUR	Hatice Küçükyıldız
71	FW	GEO	Mariam Danelia
88		TUR	Zeynep Koyuncu
97		TUR	Bişra Yılmaz
