= Nino Pasikashvili =

Georgian footballer

Nino Pasikashvili ნინო პასიკაშვილი
Personal information
- Full name: Nino Pasikashvili
- Date of birth: 4 December 1991 (age 34)
- Place of birth: Georgia
- Height: 1.65 m (5 ft 5 in)
- Position: Midfielder

Team information
- Current team: Kvartali FC
- Number: 3

Senior career*
Years	Team	Apps	(Gls)
- FC Iveria Khashuri
- FC Norchi Dinamoeli
2012–2014	FC Minsk	15	(3)
2014–2016	Adana İdmanyurduspor	23	(5)
2016–2017	Ataşehir Belediyespor	30	(3)
2018	WFC Nike		
2019	WFC Nike	15	(29)
2020-2021	Kvartali FC	28	(12)
2021-2022	FC Dinamo Sokhumi		
2023-	Kvartali FC	34	(7)

International career
2008	Georgia U-17	3	(0)
2009-2010	Georgia U-19	6	(0)
2010-	Georgia	81	(3)
- * Club domestic league appearances and goals as of Aug 13, 2024

Nino Pasikashvili (Georgian: ნინო პასიკაშვილი, born December 4, 1991) is a Georgian football midfielder. She played for Ataşehir Belediyespor in the Turkish First League, and the Georgian national team. She has played in the Georgian Championship for Iveria Khashuri, Norchi Dinamoeli, with whom she also played the European Cup, for the Belarusian team FC Minsk, for the Ukrainian team WFC Zhytlobud-1 Kharkiv and for the Turkish club Adana İdmanyurduspor. She is currently the captain of Kvartali FC, the current leader of the Georgian Championship

== Playing career ==
=== Club ===
In the 2012–13 season, Nino Pasikashvili transferred to FC Minsk, playing in the Belarus women's first league. In the 2013–14 season, Nino Pasikashvili transferred to FC Kharkiv playing in the Ukraine Women's first league, in 2014–16 season, Nino Pasikashvili transferred to Adana İdmanyurduspor playing in the Turkish Women's First Football League.

On February 5, 2016, she signed with the Istanbul-based club Ataşehir Belediyespor.

After many years playing out of her country, she came back and continued playing for WFC Nike in the 2018–2019 seasons. In 2020 she transferred to Kvartali FC, a newly made club in the Georgian Championship. Pasikashvili became the captain of the team and made over 25 appearances for the team in 1 and a half season. In 2021 after half a season in Kvartali FC Pasikashvili made a move to FC Dinamo Sokhumi. After a year and a half in the club, Pasikashvili decided to move again and go back to Kvartali FC, where she is currently playing. Nino Pasikashvili is the captain of the team with over 30 appearances for the club in less than 2 years. Pasikashvili and her team are the current leaders of the Georgian Championship.

=== International ===
Pasikashvili played for the Georgia women's national U-17 and U-19 teams before she appeared for the Georgia national team. She took part at the 2015 FIFA Women's World Cup qualification (UEFA) – Group B matches, and scored one goal for her country. Nino Pasikashvili is currently playing in the starting 11 for the Georgia women's national football team. Even after many loses, the national team still wrote history, winning a match against Luxembourg after 7 years of no official wins for the country. Pasikashvili was also the part of the astonishing win against Lithuania in July 2024, where the country made it to UEFA Women's Euro qualification play-offs for the first time.

== Career statistics ==
As of Auf 13, 2024.

Club	Season	League			Continental		National		Total	
Club	Season	Division	Apps	Goals	Apps	Goals	Apps	Goals	Apps	Goals
WFC Iveria Khashuri	2007–2012				6	0	9	0	15	0
WFC Iveria Khashuri	Total				6	0	9	0	15	0
FC Minsk	2012–2013	Premier League	15	3	–	–	3	1	18	4
FC Minsk	Total		15	3	–	–	3	1	18	4
FC Kharkhiv	2013-2013	Premier league	6	1	-	-	-	-	-	-
Adana İdmanyurduspor	2014–15	First League	15	2	–	–	0	0	15	2
Adana İdmanyurduspor	2015–16	First League	8	3	–	–	0	0	8	3
Adana İdmanyurduspor	Total		23	5	–	–	0	0	23	5
FC Grodno	2015-2015	Premier league	5	1	1					5
Ataşehir Belediyespor	2015–16	First League	6	2	–	–	0	0	6	2
Ataşehir Belediyespor	2016–17	First League	24	1	–	–	0	0	24	1
Ataşehir Belediyespor	Total		30	3	–	–	0	0	30	3
WFC NIKE	2018		17	14	12	-				14
WFC NIKE	2019		15	29	14	-				29
Kvartali FC	2020		13	6	15					6
Kvartali FC	2021		15	6	14					8
FC Dinamo Sokhumi	2021									
FC Dinamo Sokhumi	2022									
Kvartali FC	2023		20	5						
Kvartali FC	2024		14	2						

== International goals ==
No.	Date	Venue	Opponent	Score	Result	Competition
1.	13 July 2023	Mikheil Meskhi Stadium, Tbilisi, Georgia	Armenia	5–0	5–0	Friendly

== Honours ==
Turkish Women's First League

Ataşehir Belediyespor
Runners-up (1): 2015–16
Third places (1): 2016–17
