= Tamar Kvelidze =

Georgian footballer (born 1990)

Personal information
- Full name: Tamar Kvelidze
- Date of birth: 17 August 1990 (age 36)
- Place of birth: Soviet Union
- Position: Defender

Senior career*
Years	Team	Apps	(Gls)
- Norchi Dinamoeli
2010–2011	Baia Zugdidi		
2011	Krka Novo Mesto		
2011–2019	Karlsruher SC		

International career
- Georgia
- * Club domestic league appearances and goals

Tamar Kvelidze (Georgian: თამარ ქველიძე) is a Georgian footballer who plays as a defender. She has played for Norchi Dinamoeli and Baia Zugdidi in the Georgian Championship for Slovenian champion Krka Novo Mesto in the 2011–12 Champions League, and for Karlsruher SC.

She is a member of the Georgia national team.
