= Georgian Women's Liga 2 =

- Founded: 2021
- Country: Georgia
- Confederation: UEFA
- Number of clubs: 14
- Level on pyramid: 2
- Promotion to: Liga 1
- Current champions: Dinamo Sokhumi (2nd title) (2025)
- Website: womensleague.ge

Liga 2 is the second level of league competition for Georgian women's football since the 2021 season.

As a single nationwide league below the top level, it is the female equivalent of the men's Erovnuli Liga 2 and is run by the Georgian Football Federation.

== History ==
As the number of women's football teams experienced a rapid increase in the late 2010s, the football-governing body of the country decided to establish another league in addition to the existing Liga 1.

The first competition, launched in 2021, comprised eight clubs. Dinamo Sokhumi dominated their rivals throughout the season and recorded 14 wins in as many matches with a staggering 107–7 goal difference. The league featured eleven teams in 2022, expanded to 15 a year later when Elita shared points with Racha at top of the table and emerged victorious due to an advantageous goal difference.

In 2024, Samegrelo became the league champions after winning their all 26 matches. This year saw two clubs gaining automatic promotion and a third-place team qualifying for a top-division spot following a play-off victory.

According to new regulations introduced for the 2026 season, only the winner will be eligible for promotion to Liga 1.

== Format ==
- 2021 = 8 teams
- 2022 = 11
- 2023 = 15
- Since 2024 = 14

== Current members ==
Fourteen teams competing in the league in 2026 are listed below in alphabetical order.

Club	Position last season	Location	Region	Venue
Akhalgori	6th	Mtskheta	Mtskheta-Mtianeti	Mukhrani Central Stadium
Dinamo Gagra	12th	Tbilisi	Tbilisi	Varketili Football Centre
D10 Academy	8th	Tbilisi	Tbilisi	Nutsubidze Football Centre
Edzani	11th	Tsalka	Kvemo Kartli	Tsalka Central Stadium
Gori United	7th	Gori	Shida Kartli	Akhalbagi
Iveria	9th	Khashuri	Shida Kartli	Grigol Jomartidze Stadium
Kolkheti	3rd	Khobi	Samegrelo	Paata Tatarishvili Stadium
Mertskhali	–	Ozurgeti	Guria	Megobroba Stadium
Norchebi	4th	Tbilisi	Tbilisi	Gldani Football Centre
Norchi Dinamo	10th in Liga 1	Tbilisi	Tbilisi	Gldani Football Centre
Rustavi	5th	Rustavi	Kvemo Kartli	Rustavi Football Centre
Wings	10th	Tbilisi	Tbilisi	Vake Football Centre
Storm	–	Batumi	Ajara	Archil Partenadze stadium, Keda
Spaeri	13th	Tbilisi	Tbilisi	Spaeri Stadium

=== Top three teams ===
2021	**Dinamo Sokhumi** • Iveria • Phoenix
2022	**Batumi** • Dinamo Sokhumi-2 • Racha
2023	**Elita** • Racha • Vere
2024	**Samegrelo** • Vere • Racha
2025	**Dinamo Sokhumi** • Tetritskaro • Kolkheti

Note: Teams indicated in bold are champions.
