= Georgia football team =

Georgia football team can refer to:

- Georgia national football team, the men's association football (soccer) team of the nation of Georgia
- Georgia women's national football team, the women's association football (soccer) team of the nation of Georgia
- Georgia Bulldogs football, the American football team of the University of Georgia, United States
