= Yorcelly Humphreys =

Nicaraguan footballer (born 2001)

Personal information
- Full name: Yorcelly Isoleth Humphreys Abella
- Date of birth: 3 September 2001 (age 25)
- Place of birth: Bluefields, Nicaragua
- Position: Centre back

Team information
- Current team: Sivasspor
- Number: 45

Senior career*
Years	Team	Apps	(Gls)
2022–	Sivasspor	4	(1)

International career^{‡}
2018	Nicaragua U17	2	(1)
2018–2020	Nicaragua U20	5	(0)
2019–	Nicaragua	7	(1)
- * Club domestic league appearances and goals as of 9 March 2022 ‡ National team caps and goals as of 11 April 2021.

Yorcelly Isoleth Humphreys Abella (born 3 September 2001) is a Nicaraguan footballer who plays as a centre back for Turkish Women's Football Super League club Sivasspor and the Nicaragua women's national team.

== Early life ==
Humphreys was born in Bluefields.

== Club career ==
Humphreys started her career in 2016 with Nicaraguan women's football championship side Las Leyendas. On August 19, 2020, she signed with UNAN Managua.

On March 3, 2022, she signed to play for Sivasspor in Turkey.

== International career ==
Humphreys capped for Nicaragua at senior level during the 2020 CONCACAF Women's Olympic Qualifying Championship qualification.
