= Nino Chkhartishvili =

Georgian footballer

Personal information
- Date of birth: 25 January 1999 (age 27)
- Position: Defender

Senior career*
Years	Team	Apps	(Gls)
- WFC Lanchkhuti

International career^{‡}
- Georgia
- * Club domestic league appearances and goals as of 19:38, 30 August 2019 (UTC) ‡ National team caps and goals as of 19:38, 30 August 2019 (UTC)

Nino Chkhartishvili (born 25 January 1999) is a Georgian footballer who plays as a defender and has appeared for the Georgia women's national team.

== Career ==
Chkhartishvili has been capped for the Georgia national team, appearing for the team during the 2019 FIFA Women's World Cup qualifying cycle.
