= UEFA Women's Europa Cup clubs performance comparison =

Comparison of UEFA Women's Europa Cup club performances

The comparison of the performances of all clubs that participated in the UEFA Women's Europa Cup is presented below. Qualifying rounds are not taken into account. UEFA defines the competition proper as the 16-team knockout bracket beginning with the round of 16, after two qualifying rounds.

The inaugural 2025–26 season was won by Häcken, who defeated Hammarby in the final.

== Classification ==
Code	Classification
C	Champions
F	Runners-up
SF	Semi-finals
QF	Quarter-finals
R16	Round of 16
•	Did not participate

== Performance ==
Countries are ranked by total number of participations, then by the number of different participating clubs, and then alphabetically. Clubs are ranked by number of participations, then by titles, runner-up finishes, semi-final appearances, quarter-final appearances, and finally alphabetically.

The ongoing 2026–27 season is shown with an empty column because no club has yet reached the competition proper. The first and second qualifying rounds determine the 16 clubs that enter the round of 16.

#	Clubs (# of participations)	25–26	26–27
(Denmark)	DENMARK (2)	(2)	(0)
1	Nordsjælland (1)	QF	
2	Fortuna Hjørring (1)	R16	
(Netherlands)	NETHERLANDS (2)	(2)	(0)
1	Ajax (1)	R16	
2	PSV Eindhoven (1)	R16	
(Sweden)	SWEDEN (2)	(2)	(0)
1	Häcken (1)	C	
2	Hammarby (1)	F	
(Austria)	AUSTRIA (1)	(1)	(0)
1	Austria Wien (1)	QF	
(Belgium)	BELGIUM (1)	(1)	(0)
1	Anderlecht (1)	R16	
(Czech Republic)	CZECH REPUBLIC (1)	(1)	(0)
1	Sparta Prague (1)	SF	
(Germany)	GERMANY (1)	(1)	(0)
1	Eintracht Frankfurt (1)	SF	
(Iceland)	ICELAND (1)	(1)	(0)
1	Breiðablik (1)	QF	
(Italy)	ITALY (1)	(1)	(0)
1	Inter Milan (1)	R16	
(Portugal)	PORTUGAL (1)	(1)	(0)
1	Sporting CP (1)	QF	
(Scotland)	SCOTLAND (1)	(1)	(0)
1	Glasgow City (1)	R16	
(Slovenia)	SLOVENIA (1)	(1)	(0)
1	Mura (1)	R16	
(Switzerland)	SWITZERLAND (1)	(1)	(0)
1	Young Boys (1)	R16	

== See also ==
- UEFA Women's Europa Cup
- UEFA Women's Champions League clubs performance comparison
- UEFA Women's Champions League
