= Georgia women's national football team =

Women's national association football team representing Georgia

Georgia
- Association: Georgian Football Federation
- Confederation: UEFA (Europe)
- Head coach: Iris Antman
- Captain: Lela Chichinadze
- Most caps: Nino Pasikashvili (88)
- Top scorer: Teona Bakradze (15)
- FIFA code: GEO
First colours	Second colours	Third colours

FIFA ranking
- Current: 129 ▲3 (20 October 2026)
- Highest: 88 (December 2009, December 2017)
- Lowest: 128 (October – December 2022)

First international
- FR Yugoslavia 11–0 Georgia (Kula, FR Yugoslavia; 10 September 1997)

Biggest win
- Andorra 0–7 Georgia (Ta'Qali, Malta; 9 April 2015)

Biggest defeat
- Denmark 15–0 Georgia (Vejle, Denmark; 24 October 2009); Georgia 0–15 Sweden (Gori, Georgia; 7 April 2022)

The Georgia women's national football team represents Georgia in international football. Georgia took part in the world cup qualification group 7 for the 1999 FIFA Women's World Cup, but withdrew after two matches, against Yugoslavia (0–11) and Turkey (0–1). After this, Georgia did not take part in qualification until the European Championships in 2009. Then, Georgia were placed in a group with Turkey, Northern Ireland and Croatia. Georgia finished last, with no points.

Georgia won their first match on 11 May 2009, winning 3–1 against Macedonia, and also scoring their first goal in a competitive game that year, in a 1–3 defeat to Scotland in the qualification for the 2011 World Cup. However, they also set a new negative record that year; the qualification opened with a 0–15 defeat to Denmark. In the subsequent qualifiers for the 2013 European Championship and 2015 World Cup the team couldn't make it past the preliminary round, ranking third of four teams in both occasions.

== Results and fixtures ==
The following is a list of match results in the last 12 months, as well as any future matches that have been scheduled.

Legend

Win Draw Loss Fixture

=== 2026 ===
3 March 2027 FIFA Women's World Cup qualification	Greece	3–0	Georgia	Heraklion, Greece
17:30 (18:30 UTC+2)	Markou 20'; Brouksair 80'; Tzourtzevits 86'	Report		Stadium: Theodoros Vardinogiannis Stadium; Attendance: 730; Referee: Lizzy van der Helm (Netherlands)

18 April 2027 FIFA Women's World Cup qualification	Faroe Islands	1–0	Georgia	Tórshavn, Faroe Islands
18:00 (17:00 UTC+1)	Brændstrup 90'	Report		Stadium: Tórsvøllur; Attendance: 728; Referee: Stacey Pearson (England)

5 June 2027 FIFA Women's World Cup qualification	Georgia	2–3	Faroe Islands	Tbilisi, Georgia
	Bebia 15' (pen.); Bukhrikidze 53'	Report	Zakariasardótti 45+3'; Joensen 87' (pen.); Mohr 90'	Stadium: David Petriashvili Stadium

9 June 2027 FIFA Women's World Cup qualification	Georgia	2–3	Greece	Tbilisi, Georgia
20:00 EEST	Theodoraki 6' (o.g.); Brame 63' (o.g.)	Report	Chalatsogianni 3'; Theodoraki 22'; Brookshire 60'	Stadium: Mikheil Meskhi Stadium; Referee: Veronika Vasylchenko (Ukraine)

9 October Friendly	Moldova	1–0	Georgia	Chișinău, Moldova
17:00	Colesnicenco 67'	Report		Stadium: Stadionul Zimbru; Referee: Ana Maria Terteleac (Romania)

12 October Friendly	Moldova	0–1	Georgia	Chișinău, Moldova
17:00		Report	Daniela 65'	Stadium: Stadionul Zimbru; Referee: Ana Maria Terteleac (Romania)

- Georgia Results and Fixtures – Soccerway.com

== Coaching staff ==
=== Current coaching staff ===
As of 14 November 2025

Position	Name	Ref.
Head coach	Nino Pasikashvili	nakrebi.ge
Assistant coach	Khatuna Kapanadze	nakrebi.ge
Goalkeeping coach	Nino Chichinadze	nakrebi.ge
Physical coach	Tamar Kvaratskhelia	nakrebi.ge

=== Manager history ===
- Teimuraz Svanadze (20??–2021)
- Nino Pasikashvili (2021–present)

== Players ==
=== Current squad ===
The following players were called up for the 2027 FIFA Women's World Cup qualification matches against Faroe Islands and Greece on 5 and 9 June 2026, respectively.

Caps and goals correct as of 9 June 2026, after the match against Greece.

No.	Pos.	Player	Date of birth (age)	Caps	Goals	Club
1	GK	Eka Tabagari	22 October 2003 (age 23)	0	0	(Georgian Football Federation) Lanchkhuti
12	GK	Tatia Gabunia	7 July 2000 (age 26)	41	0	(Georgian Football Federation) Nike Lusso
22	GK	Svetlana Gabelaia	19 April 2002 (age 24)	6	0	(Georgian Football Federation) Lanchkhuti
4	DF	Nino Chkhartishvili	5 January 1999 (age 27)	48	0	(Georgian Football Federation) Lanchkhuti
11	DF	Lizi Mtskerashvili	17 February 2003 (age 23)	15	1	(Georgian Football Federation) Lanchkhuti
17	DF	Natela Tsotseria	30 May 2002 (age 24)	8	0	(Georgian Football Federation) Batumi
20	DF	Mariam Kapanadze	9 February 2003 (age 23)	2	0	(Georgian Football Federation) Batumi
21	DF	Mariam Kalandadze	19 December 2000 (age 25)	48	1	(Hellenic Football Federation) Panathinaikos
23	DF	Sopiko Narsia	3 May 2000 (age 26)	9	0	(Georgian Football Federation) =Lanchkhuti
2	MF	Elene Bolkvadze	17 December 2009 (age 16)	0	0	(Georgian Football Federation) Nike Lusso
3	MF	Nino Pasikashvili	4 December 1991 (age 34)	91	3	(Georgian Football Federation) Lanchkhuti
5	MF	Nata Kvirkvaia	5 February 2006 (age 20)	2	0	(Georgian Football Federation) Vere
6	MF	Natia Danelia	23 September 2003 (age 23)	44	7	(Georgian Football Federation) Lanchkhuti
7	MF	Lizi Kankia	21 November 2006 (age 19)	2	0	(Georgian Football Federation) Kvartali
10	MF	Ana Cheminava	1 February 1996 (age 30)	58	4	(Israel Football Association) Hapoel Tel Aviv
15	MF	Tinatin Ambalia	3 November 2006 (age 20)	27	4	(Football Association of the Czech Republic) Sparta Prague
16	MF	Ana Pavliashvili	22 December 2006 (age 19)	2	0	(Georgian Football Federation) Nike Lusso
	MF	Irina Khaburdzania	25 October 1999 (age 27)	26	1	(Georgian Football Federation) Nike Lusso
8	FW	Sophie Khelashvili	23 January 2008 (age 18)	1	0	(United States Soccer Federation) Bowling Green Falcons
9	FW	Maiko Bebia	20 May 2003 (age 23)	34	5	(Turkish Football Federation) Yuksekovaspor
13	FW	Tekla Beridze	17 June 2010 (age 16)	1	0	(Georgian Football Federation) Nike Lusso
14	FW	Eter Sulashvili	23 May 2004 (age 22)	7	0	(Georgian Football Federation) Lanchkhuti
18	FW	Keso Metonidze	21 November 2008 (age 17)	8	0	(Georgian Football Federation) Nike Lusso
19	FW	Nino Bukhrikidze	19 April 2006 (age 20)	28	2	(Georgian Football Federation) Lanchkhuti

=== Recent call-ups ===
The following players have also been called up to the squad within the past 12 months.

Pos.	Player	Date of birth (age)	Caps	Goals	Club	Latest call-up
GK	Teona Sukhashvili	6 February 1994 (age 32)	15	0	(Georgia (country)) Nike Lusso	v. Moldova, 27 October 2025
DF	Tamar Tatuashvili ^{INJ}	17 August 1990 (age 36)	66	1	(Israel) Maccabi Holon	v. Faroe Islands, 5 June 2026
DF	Gvantsa Kadagishvili ^{INJ}	28 May 2002 (age 24)	41	0	(Georgia (country)) Nike Lusso	v. Faroe Islands, 5 June 2026
DF	Salome Gasviani	30 January 2001 (age 25)	25	0	(Georgia (country)) Nike Lusso	v. Faroe Islands, 18 April 2026
DF	Nino Gujabidze	15 November 2000 (age 26)	3	0	(Georgia (country)) Lanchkhuti	v. Greece, 3 March 2026
DF	Ani Akobidze ^{INJ}	12 February 2003 (age 23)	1	0	(Georgia (country)) Nike Lusso	v. Greece, 3 March 2026
DF	Tamar Kvelidze	17 August 1990 (age 36)	39	0	(Germany) FV Ettlingenweier	v. Cyprus, 3 June 2025
MF	Elene Enjibadze	12 February 2005 (age 21)	4	0	(Georgia (country)) Nike Lusso	v. Faroe Islands, 18 April 2026
MF	Anano Mikaberidze	7 May 2008 (age 18)	0	0	(Georgia (country)) Kvartali	v. Faroe Islands, 18 April 2026
MF	Tatyana Matveeva	25 July 1990 (age 36)	59	6	(Georgia (country)) Lanchkhuti	v. Greece, 3 March 2026
MF	Natia Jojua	30 March 2007 (age 19)	2	0	(Georgia (country)) Elite	v. Greece, 3 March 2026
MF	Anastasia Bolkvadze	6 November 2002 (age 24)	14	1	(Georgia (country)) Lanchkhuti	v. Cyprus, 3 June 2025
FW	Anano Tsikaridze	14 April 2009 (age 17)	4	0	Lanchkhuti	v. Greece, 3 March 2026
FW	Teona Bakradze	24 January 1996 (age 30)	60	15	(Georgia (country)) Nike Lusso	v. Moldova, 27 October 2025
Notes: ^{INJ} = Withdrew due to injury; ^{MED} = Withdrew due to medical reasons; ^{PRE} = Preliminary squad

== Records ==
*Active players in bold, statistics correct as of 6 September 2021.

=== Most capped players ===
#	Player	Year(s)	Caps

=== Top goalscorers ===
#	Player	Year(s)	Goals	Caps

== Competitive record ==
=== FIFA Women's World Cup ===
FIFA Women's World Cup record									Qualification record						
Year	Result	Pld	W	D*	L	GF	GA	GD	Pld	W	D*	L	GF	GA	GD
(China) 1991	Part of Soviet Union								Part of Soviet Union						
(Sweden) 1995	Did not enter								UEFA Euro 1995						
(United States) 1999	Did not qualify								Annulled (withdrew)						
(United States) 2003	Did not qualify								Did not enter						
(China) 2007	Did not qualify								Did not enter						
(Germany) 2011	Did not qualify								8	0	1	7	3	42	−39
(Canada) 2015	Did not qualify								3	1	0	2	5	7	−2
(France) 2019	Did not qualify								3	1	1	1	3	3	0
(Australia) (New Zealand) 2023	Did not qualify								8	0	0	8	0	54	−54
(Brazil) 2027	To be determined								To be determined						
(Costa Rica) (Jamaica) (Mexico) (United States) 2031	To be determined								To be determined						
(United Kingdom) 2035	To be determined								To be determined						
Total	—	–	–	–	–	–	–	–	22	2	2	18	11	106	−95

*Draws include knockout matches decided on penalty kicks.

=== UEFA Women's Championship ===
UEFA Women's Championship record								Qualifying record							
Year	Result	Pld	W	D*	L	GF	GA	Pld	W	D*	L	GF	GA	P/R	Rnk
1984 to (Denmark) 1991	Part of Soviet Union							Part of Soviet Union							
(Italy) 1993 to (England) 2005	Did not enter							Did not enter							
(Finland) 2009	Did not qualify							3	0	0	3	0	19	–	
(Sweden) 2013	Did not qualify							3	1	1	1	1	1	–	
(Netherlands) 2017	Did not qualify							11	2	0	9	12	36	–	
(England) 2022	Did not qualify							10	0	0	10	3	45	–	
(Switzerland) 2025	Did not qualify							8	3	1	4	6	16	(Note: From Euro 2025 onwards a new qualifying format was introduced, linked to the Women's Nations League where teams are divided into leagues with promotion/relegation between the leagues at the end of each cycle.)	40th
(Germany) 2029	To be determined							To be determined							
Total	—	–	–	–	–	–	–	35	6	2	27	16	117	40th	

*Draws include knockout matches decided on penalty kicks.

=== UEFA Women's Nations League ===
UEFA Women's Nations League record
Year	League	Group	Pos	Pld	W	D	L	GF	GA	P/R	Rnk
2023–24	C	2	4th	6	1	2	3	5	11	Same position	48th
2025	C	2	3rd	6	2	0	4	9	11	Same position	50th
Total				12	3	2	7	14	22	48th and 50th	

▲	Promoted at end of season
Same position	No movement at end of season
▼	Relegated at end of season
*	Participated in promotion/relegation play-offs

== See also ==
- Sport in Georgia
  - Football in Georgia
    - Georgia women's football championship
- Georgia women's national under-20 football team
- Georgia women's national under-17 football team
- Georgia men's national football team
