= Skye Gunn =

American soccer player (born 1997)

Personal information
- Full name: Skye Ambriel Gunn
- Date of birth: June 26, 1997 (age 29)
- Place of birth: Delray Beach, Florida, United States
- Height: 5 ft 8 in (1.73 m)
- Positions: Midfielder; forward

Team information
- Current team: Sivasspor
- Number: 33

Youth career
- 2012–2015: Weston FC

College career
Years	Team	Apps	(Gls)
2015–2016	Averett Cougars	35	(12)
2017–2018	Jacksonville Dolphins		

Senior career*
Years	Team	Apps	(Gls)
2022	Sivasspor	9	(0)
- * Club domestic league appearances and goals as of May 5, 2022

Skye Ambriel Gunn (born June 26, 1997) is an American professional soccer player.

== Early years ==
Between 2012 and 2015, Gunn played for Weston FC.

She played college soccer at Averett Cougars in 2015 and 2016 at the NCAA Division III level. She appeared in 35 games and scored 12 goals. Between 2017 and 2018, she transferred to Jacksonville University.

== Club career ==
In the beginning of March 2022, she moved to Turkey and signed a deal with Sivasspor to play in the second half of the 2021–22 Women's Super League. She appeared in nine matches.

== Personal life ==
Gunn was born to Marc Gunn and Bridgette Hill in Delray Beach, Florida. She is related to former American football player Barry Hill (1953–2010).

She graduated from the American Heritage High School in Delray Beach in 2015.
