= Teodora Jankovska =

Macedonian footballer

Personal information
- Date of birth: 16 January 2002 (age 24)
- Position: Defender

International career^{‡}
Years	Team	Apps	(Gls)
2017–2018	North Macedonia U-17	6	(0)
2019	North Macedonia U-19	3	(0)
2021–	North Macedonia	1	(0)
- ‡ National team caps and goals as of 11:47, 8 December 2021 (UTC)

Teodora Jankovska (born 16 January 2002) is a Macedonian footballer who plays as a defender for the North Macedonia national team.

== International career ==
Jankovska made her debut for the North Macedonia national team on 29 November 2021, against Northern Ireland.
