= Juventus Training Center (Turin) =

Football training facility in Turin

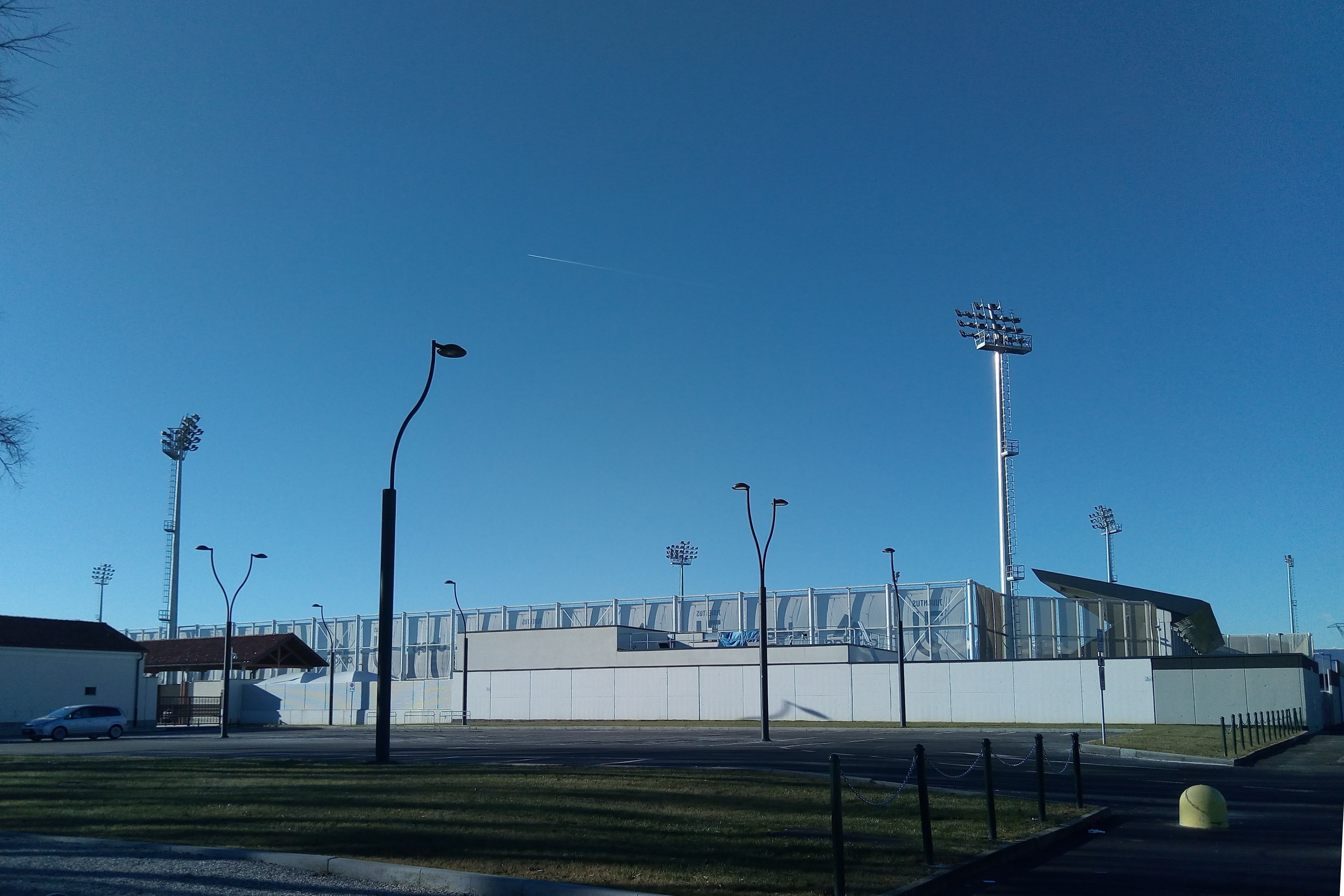
- JuventusTrainingCenter
- Interactive map of Juventus Training Center
- Location: Turin
- Coordinates: 45°06′47.394″N 07°37′48.532″E
- Owner: Juventus FC
- Capacity: 600
- Type: Football training facility

Construction
- Groundbreaking: 2015
- Opened: 2018

The Juventus Training Center is a football training facility owned by Juventus, located in the city of Turin. The training ground is part of the J-Village and features modern facilities and was opened in April 2018. The facility measures a total of 59,500 square meters.

It is used as a training ground for the Juventus men's team and the Juventus U23 team, replacing the training center in Vinovo, which is now exclusively used for the matches and training for that of the Juventus youth sector (already from 2017), and that of the women's team.

== Facilities ==
The training area includes:

- four natural grass training fields;
- locker rooms;
- technical and medical staff offices;
- physiotherapy rooms;
- a gym;
- a pool.

The media center includes:

- a room for technical meetings and video viewing;
- the JTV television studios;
- the press room, which can accommodate up to 30 journalists, for press conferences;
- areas reserved for sponsors.
