= Natia Danelia =

Georgian footballer (born 2003)

Personal information
- Date of birth: 23 September 2003 (age 23)
- Position: Midfielder

Team information
- Current team: Kvartali FC

Senior career*
Years	Team	Apps	(Gls)
2019	WFC Nike	17	(17)
2020	Kvartali FC	12	(12)
2021	Kvartali FC	19	(4)
2021	FC Sogdiana	14	(4)
2022	Kvartali FC	12	(7)
2023	Kvartali FC	19	(10)
2024	Kvartali FC	14	(28)

International career^{‡}
2018–	Georgia U17	16	(4)
2019–	Georgia	5	(0)
- * Club domestic league appearances and goals ‡ National team caps and goals as of 12:09, 19 January 2021 (UTC)

Natia Danelia (Georgian: ნათია დანელია; born 23 September 2003) is a Georgian footballer who plays as a midfielder for Kvartali FC Tbilisi and the Georgia women's national team.

== Career ==
Danelia has been capped for the Georgia national team, appearing for the team during the UEFA Women's Euro 2021 qualifying cycle. She was in the Women's U17 National Team for Georgia and has made 8 appearances there. She scored 2 goals and got 3 yellow cards in these 8 appearances. She was also in the Women's U19 National Team for Georgia and has made only 2 appearances. Now she is in the starting 11 of the GWNT, where she has made 20 appearances. She has scored 2 goals and has won a total of 3 games. Natia Danelia has played outside of her birth country. She was in WFC Sogdiana where she won the Super Cup, with her current teammate Ani Dzadzua. She is currently wearing the number 77 on Kvartali's shirt, whilst representing her country with number 6 on her back. Natia Danelia is one of the greatest football players in the whole country and has a bright future ahead of her.

== International goals ==
No.	Date	Venue	Opponent	Score	Result	Competition
1.	13 July 2023	Mikheil Meskhi Stadium, Tbilisi, Georgia	Armenia	2–0	5–0	Friendly
2.	16 July 2023	Mikheil Meskhi Stadium, Tbilisi, Georgia	Armenia	2–1	3–1	Friendly
3.	1 December 2023	Mikheil Meskhi Stadium, Tbilisi, Georgia	Luxembourg	4–2	4–2	2023–24 UEFA Women's Nations League
4.	25 February 2025	AEK Arena, Larnaca, Cyprus	Cyprus	1–2	1–2	2025 UEFA Women's Nations League
5.	4 April 2025	Mikheil Meskhi Stadium, Tbilisi, Georgia	Malta	2–3	2–3	2025 UEFA Women's Nations League
6.	27 October 2025	Mikheil Meskhi Stadium, Tbilisi, Georgia	Moldova	2–0	3–0	Friendly
7.	27 October 2025	Mikheil Meskhi Stadium, Tbilisi, Georgia	Moldova	3–0	3–0	Friendly
8.	12 October 2026	Stadionul Zimbru, Chișinău, Moldova	Moldova	1–0	1–0	Friendly
