= Kelly Bailie =

Northern Irish footballer (born 1980)

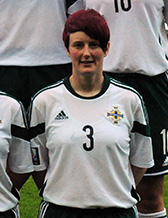

Personal information
- Date of birth: 26 July 1980 (age 46)
- Position: Defender

Team information
- Current team: Glentoran

College career
Years	Team	Apps	(Gls)
2003–2004	Syracuse Orange		

International career
- Northern Ireland

Kelly Bailie (born 26 July 1980) is a Northern Irish footballer who plays for Glentoran W.F.C. Bailie played for the Syracuse Orange women's soccer team representing Syracuse University from 2003–2004.
