= W.F.C. Nike Lusso =

WFC Nike Lusso
- Full name: Women's Football Club Nike Lusso
- Nicknames: Nike, Lusso
- Founded: 2018
- Ground: Didi Digomi Football Center.
- Head coach: Gaga Kirkitadze
- League: Georgia women's football championship
Home colours	Away colours

WFC Nike Lusso (Georgian: ნიკე-ლუსო) is a Georgian women’s association football club based in Tbilisi. The club was originally founded in 2018 under the name WFC Nike (named after the Greek goddess of victory) and was previously known as Samegrelo Chkhorotsku. It was later acquired by the Lusso Group and rebranded to its current identity. Nike Lusso competes in the Georgian Women’s League.

They play their home games at the Didi Digomi Football Centre in Tbilisi.

== History ==
Nike Lusso were founded in 2018 as WFC Nike, named after the Greek goddess of Victory. They enjoyed immediate success, winning the league in their maiden season.

The following season they finished runners up, and competed the women's Champions League for the first time - losing all three qualifying round matches including a 3-0 defeat to group winners Hibernian.

Their second league title came in 2020 and they contested the 2021–22 UEFA Women's Champions League, losing heavily to FC Twente before being forced to withdraw from their third place playoff after a positive COVID test.

In 2022 they joined FC Samegrelo Chkhorotsku and took on their name, and won their third league title. The following season they competed in the women's champions league for the third time

In 2024, they were taken over by Lusso Group - an importer of luxury cars and became known as Nike Lusso. The following season they won their fourth league title, also winning the Georgian Cup.

=== Uyar affair ===
In January 2025, Mehmet Uyar, a Turkish businessman and president and owner of WFC Nike Lusso, was arrested by Georgian police following allegations that he sexually assaulted a 20-year-old player from the club and the Georgian national team. According to prosecutors, the assault occurred after a team celebration when the player was driven to Uyar's private residence instead of her home. Uyar denied the charges, maintaining that he never used violence. Following nine months in pre-trial detention, Tbilisi City Court judge Giorgi Arevadze acquitted Uyar, prompting prosecutors to announce an appeal. The ruling required medical attention for the player, who experienced worsening post-traumatic stress disorder.

The case drew widespread public attention, prompting expressions of solidarity for the player from rights groups and other football clubs amid broader discussions on institutional accountability and player safety. On 29 September 2026, WFC Lanchkhuti disrupted a match against Nike Lusso in protest of the acquittal, displaying critical banners and airing additional allegations regarding the club's management.

== Honours ==
Georgian Championship
Winners (4) : 2018, 2020, 2022 2025
Runners up (2): 2019, 2023
Georgian Cup
Winners (1) : 2025

== Results in Europe ==
Season	Competition	Round	Country	Club	Home	Away	Aggregate
2019–20	UEFA Women's Champions League	Qualifying round	(Scotland)	Hibernian	—N/a	0–3	—N/a
2019–20	UEFA Women's Champions League	Qualifying round	(Slovenia)	Pomurje	—N/a	0–4	—N/a
2019–20	UEFA Women's Champions League	Qualifying round	(Wales)	Cardiff Met	—N/a	1–5	—N/a
2021–22	UEFA Women's Champions League	First qualifying round semi final	(Netherlands)	FC Twente	—N/a	0–9	—N/a
2021–22	UEFA Women's Champions League	First qualifying round third place playoff	(Republic of Ireland)	Peamount United	—N/a	w/o	—N/a
2023–24	UEFA Women's Champions League	First qualifying round semi final	(Slovenia)	Mura	—N/a	0–0 (5–4 (p))	—N/a
2023–24	UEFA Women's Champions League	First qualifying round final	(Cyprus)	Apollon Ladies	—N/a	0–3	—N/a
