= Kvartali FC =

Football club in Tbilisi, Georgia

Kvartali
- Full name: Kvartali Football Club
- Founded: 2016
- Ground: GFF Football Center (Nutsubidze Plateau), Tbilisi
- Head coach: Shalva Pirtskhalava
- League: Georgia women's football championship
- Website: https://kvartali.ge
Home colours	Away colours

Kvartali Football Club (Georgian: საფეხბურთო კლუბი „კვარტალი“, Saphekhburto Klubi Kvartali), commonly known as Kvartali FC, FC Kvartali, or simply Kvartali, is a football club based in Tbilisi, Georgia. Founded in 2016, the club fields men’s, women’s and youth teams. The women’s side competes in the Georgian Women’s League, while men’s and youth teams participate in domestic and grassroots competitions.

== History ==
- 2016 – Kvartali FC founded, including men’s amateur teams.
- 2018 – Women’s department launched through nationwide grassroots scouting.
- 2019 – Women’s team registered for the Georgian Women's Football League (Top Division).
- 2020 – Youth section initiated, beginning with under-10 age group teams.
- 2022 – Long-term partnership with APG Georgia established.
- 2023 – Permanent home ground secured via community pitch partnership.
- 2024 – Youth section expanded under GFF/UEFA development programmes; ECA membership granted.
- 2025 – Awarded the Bronze Prize in the UEFA Grassroots Awards (Best Amateur Club).

== Ground ==
Kvartali plays its home matches at the GFF Football Center (Nutsubidze Plateau) in Tbilisi.

== Teams ==
=== Women’s team ===
The women’s section competes in the Georgia Women’s League. In April 2025, Kvartali was awarded the Bronze Prize at the UEFA Grassroots Awards for Best Amateur Club.

=== Men’s and youth teams ===
Kvartali also runs men’s and youth squads, participating in grassroots and regional competitions in Georgia. The club places strong emphasis on community engagement and player development.

== Players ==
=== Current squad ===
As of 19 September 2025.

Note: Flags indicate national team as defined under FIFA eligibility rules; some limited exceptions apply. Players may hold more than one non-FIFA nationality.

No.	Pos.	Nation	Player
1	GK	GEO	Elene Bondareva
91	GK	GEO	Lika Tsukhurkaidze
2	DF	GEO	Mariam Shoshitashvili
5	DF	GEO	Tako Svanidze
6	DF	GEO	Elizabeth Rizhamadze
15	DF	GEO	Nini Nadaraia
16	DF	GEO	Natia Tsetskhladze
19	DF	GEO	Lizi Gogaladze
23	DF	GEO	Ani Dzadzua

No.	Pos.	Nation	Player
4	MF	GEO	Mariam Gasanova
7	MF	GEO	Lizi Kankia (captain)
8	MF	GEO	Mariam Mamphoria
10	MF	GEO	Ana Dolishvili
9	FW	GEO	Mariam Goguadze
11	FW	GEO	Anano Miqaberidze
14	FW	GEO	Mariam Darchiashvili
17	FW	GEO	Nini Chketiani
18	FW	GEO	Mariam Tsiskarishvili
22	FW	GEO	Mariam Khutsishvili

=== Former players ===
- (Georgia (country)) Tinatin Ambalia
- (Georgia (country)) Nino Sutidze
- (Georgia (country)) Natia Danelia
- (Georgia (country)) Tatia Gabunia
- (Georgia (country)) Nino Pasikashvili

== Coaching ==
As of 2026, the club’s head coach is Demna Tsenguashvili.

== Partnerships ==
In 2022, Kvartali entered a long-term partnership with APG Georgia. In 2025, Kvartali also announced a sponsorship agreement with Betsson to support youth and women’s football development.

== Honours ==
- UEFA Grassroots Awards – Best Amateur Club (Bronze): 2024/25
