= Georgia women's football championship =

Football league in Georgia

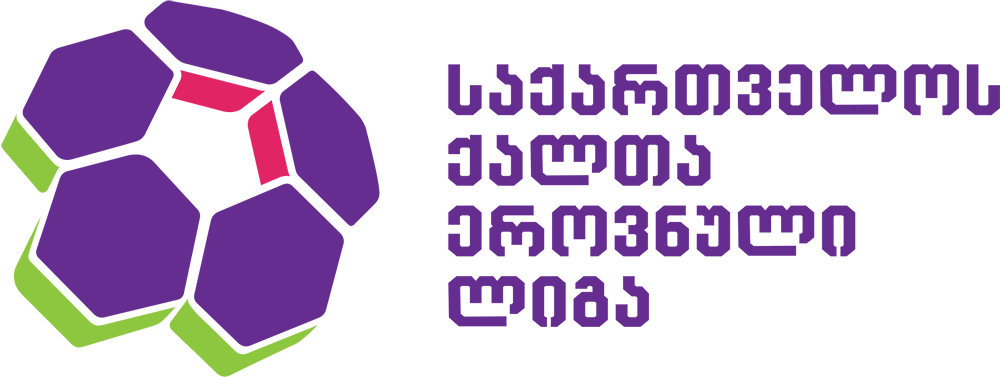
- Founded: 1990
- Country: Georgia
- Confederation: UEFA
- Number of clubs: 10
- Level on pyramid: 1
- Relegation to: Liga 2
- International cup: UEFA Champions League
- Current champions: Nike Lusso (3rd title) (2025)
- Website: http://womensleague.ge/
- Current: 2026

The Georgia Women's Football Championship is contested in the top level women's football league in Georgia. The league ran until 2010 and was for a time defunct, in 2014 an attempt was made to restore the championship in the form of a cup tournament. In 2015, no tournament was held, but the competition resumed in 2016.

== History ==
In 2004, a league was established. It ran for six years in the form of mini-tournaments. It was eventually disbanded for monetary reasons and limited player numbers. The number of teams varied from year to year. In 2008 there were 4 teams, 7 in 2009 and 5 in 2010.

Renewed interest in women's football lead to a new improved league 2014. After years of hiatus a national championship was played in cup style in August 2014.

The league seasons resumed on an annual basis in 2016. The number of participating teams was increased from six to 14 by 2020, which required forming another league. Liga 2 was launched the next year with eight members. In 2025, the women's championship consists of 24 teams split into two leagues.

Since 2025, the Georgian Football Federation has also established a national U15 League to strengthen the development pathway for women's football in Georgia.

== Structure ==
The league season is divided into two parts. The first phase comprises a regular tournament with home and away games. After 18 matches, the top four teams form Championship Group while the bottom six clubs take part in Relegation round. The team finishing in 10th place is relegated automatically and the 9th-placed team participates in playoffs against the Liga 2 runners-up.

Seasons run on a full year system, running from spring to autumn.

== Current season ==
The current iteration of the Women’s League began on 8 March 2026 with ten teams contesting the title. The clubs are listed below in alphabetical order.

Clubs	Position last season	Location	Region
Batumi	5th	Batumi	Adjara
Dinamo Sokhumi	1st in Liga 2	Tbilisi	Tbilisi
Elita	4th	Tbilisi	Tbilisi
Kvartali	3rd	Tbilisi	Tbilisi
Lanchkhuti	2nd	Lanchkhuti	Guria
Martvé	8th	Kutaisi	Imereti
Nike Lusso	1st	Tbilisi	Tbilisi
Racha	6th	Ambrolauri	Racha
Tetritskaro	2nd in Liga 2	Tetritskaro	Kvemo Kartli
Veré	7th	Tbilisi	Tbilisi

== Champions ==
- 1990: Medical School No. 3 Tbilisi
- 1997: Avaza Tbilisi
- 2006–07: Dinamo Tbilisi
- 2007–08: Iveria
- 2008–09: Kobuleti
- 2009–10: Baia
- 2014: Iberia Star Tbilisi
- 2015: Iberia Star Tbilisi
- 2016: Martve
- 2017: Martve
- 2018: WFC Nike Lusso
- 2019: Lanchkhuti
- 2020: WFC Nike Lusso
- 2021: Lanchkhuti
- 2022: Samegrelo*
- 2023: Lanchkhuti
- 2024: Lanchkhuti
- 2025: Nike Lusso

Note: Nike and Samegrelo are the previous names of current Nike-Lusso.

== Awards ==
At an annual ceremony hosted by the Georgian Football Federation at the end of each year, best players of the league are named.

Year	Player	Club	Ref.
2018	Natia Danelia	WFC Lanchkhuti	
2019	Khatia Chkonia	WFC Lanchkhuti	
2020	Khatia Chkonia	WFC Lanchkhuti	
2021	Khatia Chkonia	WFC Lanchkhuti	
2022	Lela Chichinadze	Dinamo Sokhumi	
2023	Natia Danelia	Kvartali FC	
2024	Teona Bakradze	WFC Nike Lusso	
2025	Teona Bakradze	WFC Nike Lusso	
