= WFC Lanchkhuti =

Georgian women's football club

WFC Lanchkhuti is a Georgian women's football club which competes in the top-tier Georgia women's football championship. It is part of the FC Guria Lanchkhuti club.

Lanchkhuti managed to achieve their first league title in 2019. In the following season, they competed in the 2020–21 UEFA Women's Champions League, securing the first ever win by a Georgian club in the competition following a 2–1 away win over FC Okzhetpes.

== Honours ==
Georgian Championship
Winners (4) : 2019, 2021, 2023, 2024

Georgian Cup
Winners (1) : 2019

== Results in Europe ==
Season	Competition	Round	Country	Club	Home	Away	Aggregate
2020–21	UEFA Women's Champions League	1	(Kazakhstan)	Okzhetpes	—	2–1 (a.e.t.)	—
2020–21	UEFA Women's Champions League	2	(Romania)	Olimpia Cluj	—	1–0	—
2020–21	UEFA Women's Champions League	Round of 32	(Sweden)	Rosengård	0–7	0–10	0–17
2022–23	UEFA Women's Champions League	Qualifying rounds semi-finals	(Ukraine)	Vorskla-Kharkiv-2	—	0–5	—
2022–23	UEFA Women's Champions League	Qualifying rounds third place	(Croatia)	Split	—	0–2	—
2024–25	UEFA Women's Champions League	Qualifying rounds semi-finals	(Albania)	Vllaznia	0–3	—	—
2024–25	UEFA Women's Champions League	Qualifying rounds third place	(Azerbaijan)	Neftçi	2–1	—	—
