= 2010–11 FC NSA Sofia season =

FC NSA Sofia
2010–11 season
- Chairman: Lachezar Dimitrov
- Manager: Simeon Stoyanov
- Women A PFG: Winner
- Bulgarian Women's Cup: Runners-up
- UEFA Women's Champions League: Group Stage

In 2010–11 season NSA Sofia won their 7th consecutive league trophy and participate for 6th time in row in UEFA Women's Champions League.

== Table ==
Pos	Team	Pld	W	D	L	GF	GA	GD	Pts	Qualification
1	NSA Sofia (C)	14	14	0	0	63	7	+56	42	2011–12 UEFA Women's Champions League
2	LP Super Sport Sofia	14	7	1	6	23	24	−1	22	
3	Olympia Sofia	14	7	0	7	27	25	+2	21	
4	Beroe Stara Zagora	14	5	3	6	33	27	+6	18	
5	Sportika Blagoevgrad	14	4	5	5	19	30	−11	17	
6	Ekomet 90 Plovdiv	14	5	2	7	21	29	−8	17	
7	Vihren 1984 Sandanski	14	4	4	6	16	24	−8	16	
8	Varna	14	2	1	11	10	46	−36	7	
–	Bolyarki Veliko Tarnovo	1	0	0	1	1	6	−5	0	

(C) Champions

== Matches ==
=== A PFG ===
3 October 2010 1	NSA Sofia	6 – 1	Bolyarki Veliko Tarnovo	NSA, Sofia
15:00

10 October 2010 2	Varna	1 – 4	NSA Sofia	Aksakovo, Varna
15:00	Polina Avramova 35'		Goal

17 October 2010 3	NSA Sofia	5 – 0	Vihren 1984 Sandanski	NSA, Sofia
15:00

31 October 2010 4	Ekomet 90 Plovdiv	0 – 2	NSA Sofia	Plovdiv, Plovdiv
15:00

Rest 5	v

10 November 2010 9	Sportika Blagoevgrad	0 – 10	NSA Sofia	Hristo Botev, Blagoevgrad
15:00			Velina Koshuleva 5'

14 November 2010 6	NSA Sofia	4 – 0	LP Super Sport Sofia	NSA, Sofia
14:00

21 November 2010 7	Beroe Stara Zagora	2 – 7	NSA Sofia	Beroe, Stara Zagora
14:00	Tsvetana Mancheva 46'; Petia Dikova 82'		Goal

28 November 2010 8	NSA Sofia	2 – 1	Olympia Sofia	NSA, Sofia
13:30	Valentina Gospodinova 75'; Borislava Kirilova 90+5'		Kristina Ivanova 52'

26 March 2011 10	Vihren 1984 Sandanski	0 – 2	NSA Sofia	Spartak, Sandanski
13:00

3 April 2011 11	NSA Sofia	7 – 0	Ekomet 90 Plovdiv	NSA, Sofia
14:30

17 April 2011 12	NSA Sofia	4 – 1	Beroe Stara Zagora	NSA, Sofia
14:30

8 May 2011 13	NSA Sofia	5 – 0	Varna	NSA, Sofia
11:00

29 May 2011 14	LP Super Sport Sofia	0 – 4	NSA Sofia	Gradski, Godech
15:30

5 June 2011 15	Olympia Sofia	2 – 3	NSA Sofia	Obelia, Sofia
17:00

12 June 2011 16	NSA Sofia	4 – 0	Sportika Blagoevgrad	NSA, Sofia
17:00

=== Bulgarian Cup ===
4 May 2011 Quarterfinal	Beroe Stara Zagora	0 – 5	NSA Sofia	Beroe, Stara Zagora
16:00			Silvia Radoyska; Nikoleta Karakoleva 3' (o.g.); Valentina Gospodinova 42'; Velina Koshuleva 44'; Plamena Boicheva 72' (o.g.)

11 May 2011 Semi-final	NSA Sofia	3 – 0	Vihren 1984 Sandanski	NSA, Sofia
16:00

15 June 2011 Final	NSA Sofia	2 – 3	Olympia Sofia	Vasil Levski National Stadium, Sofia
17:30	Velina Koshuleva 63'; Valentina Gospodinova 90'	Report	Ratka Živković 43'; Afrodita Salihi 52'; Jovana Sretenović 70'	Attendance: 2,000

=== UEFA Champions League ===
5 August 2010 Group Stage	(Bulgaria) NSA Sofia	7 – 0	(Turkey) Gazi Üniversitesi	Brøndby Stadium, Brøndby

7 August 2010 Group Stage	(Moldova) Roma Calfa	0 – 4	(Bulgaria) NSA Sofia	Brøndby Stadium, Brøndby

10 August 2010 Group Stage	(Bulgaria) NSA Sofia	0 – 3	(Denmark) Brøndby	Brøndby Stadium, Brøndby
