= Footballers' Footballer of the Year Awards (Bulgaria) =

Footballers' Footballer of the Year Awards (Bulgarian: Награди Футболист на футболистите) are annual association football awards for the best player of the year, best young player of the year and best manager of the year in Bulgarian football. The awards have been presented since the 2001–02 season and the winners are chosen by a vote amongst the members of the Bulgarian football players' union, the Association of Bulgarian footballers (ABF).

Every spring, before the end of the Bulgarian football championship season, a shortlist of nominees is prepared by the ABF in consultation with football journalists, players and managers. Then, in April, each professional footballer playing in the top two divisions of Bulgarian football (the Bulgarian A Professional Football Group and the Bulgarian B Professional Football Group), no matter of his nationality, votes for a total of three players, three young players and three managers from the shortlist. The awards are given to the professionals who have received most of the votes. The awards winners are announced at a gala event after the end of the football championship season.

== Winners ==
The awards have been presented since 2001. The following tables present all the winners, runners-up and third-placed players and managers.

=== Player of the year ===
Year	Winner		Runner-up		Third-placed		Notes
Year	Player	Club	Player	Club	Player	Club	Notes
2001–02	(Bulgaria) Vladimir Manchev	CSKA Sofia					
2002–03	(Bulgaria) Velizar Dimitrov	CSKA Sofia	(Bulgaria) Ilian Stoyanov	Levski Sofia	(Bulgaria) Hristo Yovov	Litex Lovech	
2003–04	(Bulgaria) Martin Kamburov	Lokomotiv Plovdiv	(Bulgaria) Emil Gargorov	CSKA Sofia	(Bulgaria) Dimitar Ivankov	Levski Sofia	
2004–05	(Bulgaria) Hristo Yanev	CSKA Sofia	(Bulgaria) Martin Kamburov	Lokomotiv Plovdiv	(Bulgaria) Blagoy Georgiev	Slavia Sofia	
2005–06	(Bulgaria) Daniel Borimirov	Levski Sofia	(Bulgaria) Stanislav Angelov	Levski Sofia	(Bulgaria) Dimitar Telkiyski	Levski Sofia	
2006–07	(Bulgaria) Hristo Yovov	Levski Sofia	(Bulgaria) Tsvetan Genkov	Lokomotiv Sofia	(Bulgaria) Stanislav Angelov	Levski Sofia	
2007–08	(Bulgaria) Georgi Hristov	Botev Plovdiv	(Bulgaria) Velizar Dimitrov	CSKA Sofia	(Bulgaria) Marcho Dafchev	Lokomotiv Sofia	
2008–09	(Bulgaria) Martin Kamburov	Lokomotiv Sofia	(Bulgaria) Georgi Ivanov	Levski Sofia	(Bulgaria) Aleksandar Aleksandrov	Cherno More Varna	
2009–10	(Bulgaria) Ivelin Popov	Litex Lovech	(Bulgaria) Martin Kamburov	Lokomotiv Sofia	(Brazil) Doka Madureira	Litex Lovech	
2010–11	(Brazil) Doka Madureira	Litex Lovech	(Mali) Garra Dembélé	Levski Sofia	(Bulgaria) Spas Delev	CSKA Sofia	
2011–12	(Brazil) Júnior Moraes	CSKA Sofia	(Bulgaria) Hristo Yanev	Litex Lovech	(Bulgaria) Emil Gargorov	Ludogorets Razgrad	
2012–13	(Bulgaria) Georgi Milanov	Litex Lovech	(Bulgaria) Ivan Tsvetkov	Botev Plovdiv	(Bulgaria) Emil Gargorov	Ludogorets Razgrad	
2013–14	(Bulgaria) Vladislav Stoyanov	Ludogorets Razgrad	(Bulgaria) Emil Gargorov	CSKA Sofia	(Bulgaria) Svetoslav Dyakov	Ludogorets Razgrad	
2014–15	(Brazil) Marcelinho	Ludogorets Razgrad	(Bulgaria) Svetoslav Dyakov	Ludogorets Razgrad	(Bulgaria) Ivan Tsvetkov	Botev Plovdiv	
2015–16	(Bulgaria) Vladislav Stoyanov	Ludogorets Razgrad	(Brazil) Marcelinho	Ludogorets Razgrad	(Bulgaria) Martin Kamburov	Lokomotiv Plovdiv	
2016–17	(Bulgaria) Todor Nedelev	Botev Plovdiv	(Bulgaria) Martin Kamburov	Beroe	(Brazil) Fernando Karanga	CSKA Sofia	

=== Young player of the year ===
Year	Winner		Runner-up		Third-placed		Notes
Year	Player	Club	Player	Club	Player	Club	Notes
2001–02	(Bulgaria) Emil Gargorov	Lokomotiv Sofia					
2002–03	(Bulgaria) Emil Gargorov	CSKA Sofia	(Bulgaria) Yordan Todorov	CSKA Sofia	(Bulgaria) Blagoy Georgiev	Slavia Sofia	
2003–04	(Bulgaria) Chavdar Yankov	Slavia Sofia	(Nigeria) Omonigho Temile	Levski Sofia	(Bulgaria) Kostadin Hazurov	CSKA Sofia	
2004–05	(Bulgaria) Chavdar Yankov	Slavia Sofia	(Bulgaria) Valeri Domovchiyski	Levski Sofia	(Bulgaria) Tsvetan Genkov	Lokomotiv Sofia	
2005–06	(Bulgaria) Valeri Domovchiyski	Levski Sofia	(Bulgaria) Tsvetan Genkov	Lokomotiv Sofia	(Bulgaria) Ivelin Popov	Litex Lovech	
2006–07	(Bulgaria) Valeri Domovchiyski	Levski Sofia	(Bulgaria) Nikolay Dimitrov	Levski Sofia	(Bulgaria) Ivelin Popov	Litex Lovech	
2007–08	(Bulgaria) Nikolay Dimitrov	Levski Sofia	(Bulgaria) Ivan Ivanov	Lokomotiv Plovdiv	(Bulgaria) Aleksandar Aleksandrov	Cherno More Varna	
2008–09	(Bulgaria) Spas Delev	Pirin Blagoevgrad	(Bulgaria) Ivan Ivanov	CSKA Sofia	(Bulgaria) Aleksandar Tonev	CSKA Sofia	
2009–10	(Bulgaria) Ismail Isa	Lokomotiv Mezdra	(Bulgaria) Spas Delev	CSKA Sofia	(Bulgaria) Daniel Zlatkov	Minyor Pernik	
2010–11	(Bulgaria) Aleksandar Tonev	CSKA Sofia	(Bulgaria) Plamen Iliev	Levski Sofia	(Bulgaria) Georgi Milanov	Litex Lovech	
2011–12	(Bulgaria) Georgi Milanov	Litex Lovech	(Bulgaria) Plamen Iliev	Levski Sofia	(Bulgaria) Anton Karachanakov	CSKA Sofia	
2012–13	(Bulgaria) Todor Nedelev	Botev Plovdiv	(Bulgaria) Simeon Slavchev	Litex Lovech	(Bulgaria) Iliya Milanov	Litex Lovech	
2013–14	(Bulgaria) Ivaylo Chochev	CSKA Sofia	(Bulgaria) Georgi Kitanov	Cherno More Varna	(Bulgaria) Kiril Despodov	Litex Lovech	
2014–15	(Bulgaria) Tsvetelin Chunchukov	Botev Plovdiv	(Bulgaria) Kristiyan Malinov	Litex Lovech	(Bulgaria) Milen Gamakov	Botev Plovdiv	
2015–16	(Bulgaria) Kristiyan Malinov	Litex Lovech	(Bulgaria) Bozhidar Kraev	Levski Sofia	(Bulgaria) Georgi Kitanov	Cherno More Varna	
2016–17	(Bulgaria) Kiril Despodov	CSKA Sofia	(Bulgaria) Antonio Vutov	Levski Sofia	(Bulgaria) Serkan Yusein	Botev Plovdiv	

=== Manager of the year ===
Year	Winner		Runner-up		Third-placed		Notes
Year	Manager	Club	Manager	Club	Manager	Club	Notes
2001–02	(Bulgaria) Ferario Spasov	Litex Lovech					
2002–03	(Bulgaria) Stoycho Mladenov	CSKA Sofia	(Bulgaria) Ferario Spasov	Litex Lovech	(Bulgaria) Dimitar Dimitrov	Lokomotiv Plovdiv	
2003–04	(Bulgaria) Eduard Eranosyan	Lokomotiv Plovdiv	(Bulgaria) Ferario Spasov	CSKA Sofia	(Bulgaria) Velislav Vutsov	Cherno More Varna	
2004–05	(Serbia and Montenegro) Miodrag Ješić	CSKA Sofia	(Bulgaria) Stefan Grozdanov	Lokomotiv Sofia	(Bulgaria) Eduard Eranosyan	Lokomotiv Plovdiv	
2005–06	(Bulgaria) Stanimir Stoilov	Levski Sofia	(Serbia and Montenegro) Ljupko Petrović	Litex Lovech	(Bulgaria) Yasen Petrov	Cherno More Varna	
2006–07	(Bulgaria) Stanimir Stoilov	Levski Sofia	(Serbia) Ljupko Petrović	Litex Lovech	(Bulgaria) Stefan Grozdanov	Lokomotiv Sofia	
2007–08	(Bulgaria) Stoycho Mladenov	CSKA Sofia	(Bulgaria) Stanimir Stoilov	Levski Sofia	(Serbia) Miodrag Ješić	Litex Lovech	
2008–09	(Bulgaria) Stanimir Stoilov	Litex Lovech	(Bulgaria) Krassimir Balakov	Chernomorets Burgas	(Bulgaria) Nikola Spasov	Cherno More Varna	
2009–10	(Bulgaria) Ilian Iliev	Beroe Stara Zagora	(Bulgaria) Angel Chervenkov	Litex Lovech	(Bulgaria) Anton Velkov	Minyor Pernik	
2010–11	(Bulgaria) Lyuboslav Penev	Litex Lovech	(Bulgaria) Ilian Iliev	Beroe Stara Zagora	(Bulgaria) Milen Radukanov	CSKA Sofia	
2011–12	(Bulgaria) Dimitar Dimitrov	Chernomorets Burgas	(Bulgaria) Ilian Iliev	Beroe Stara Zagora	(Bulgaria) Stoycho Mladenov	CSKA Sofia	
2012–13	(Bulgaria) Hristo Stoichkov	Litex Lovech	(Bulgaria) Dimitar Dimitrov	Chernomorets Burgas	(Bulgaria) Stanimir Stoilov	Botev Plovdiv	
2013–14	(Bulgaria) Stoycho Stoev	Ludogorets Razgrad	(Bulgaria) Stoycho Mladenov	CSKA Sofia	(Bulgaria) Georgi Ivanov	Cherno More Varna	
2014–15	(Bulgaria) Dimitar Vasev	Lokomotiv Sofia					
2015–16	(Bulgaria) Georgi Dermendzhiev	Ludogorets Razgrad	(Bulgaria) Hristo Yanev	CSKA Sofia	(Bulgaria) Stoycho Stoev	Levski Sofia	
2016–17	(Bulgaria) Nikolay Kirov	Botev Plovdiv	(Bulgaria) Aleksandar Tomash	Beroe	(Bulgaria) Ilian Iliev	Cherno More Varna	

=== Women's player of the year ===
The women's player of the year award has been presented since 2016.

Year	Winner		Runner-up		Third-placed		Notes
Year	Player	Club	Player	Club	Player	Club	Notes
2015–16	(Bulgaria) Silvia Radoyska	NSA Sofia	(Bulgaria) Veronika Gotseva	Sportika Blagoevgrad	(Bulgaria) Nina Georgieva	Beroe Stara Zagora	
