= Silvia Radoyska =

Bulgarian footballer

Silviya Radoyska
Personal information
- Full name: Silviya Stefanova Radoyska
- Date of birth: 12 December 1985 (age 40)
- Place of birth: Bulgaria
- Position: Midfielder

Team information
- Current team: Bulgaria women's (manager)

Senior career*
Years	Team	Apps	(Gls)
2003–2005	Supersport Sofia		
2005–2020	NSA Sofia		
2010	→ Sporting Huelva (loan)		

International career^{‡}
2003–2019	Bulgaria	150	(58)

Managerial career
- 2019–: Bulgaria women's
- * Club domestic league appearances and goals ‡ National team caps and goals as of 1 February 2016

Silviya Stefanova Radoyska (Bulgarian: Силвия Стефанова Радойска) is a Bulgarian former football midfielder, who is now manager of the Bulgaria women's national football team.

== Career ==
She played most of her career in NSA Sofia in the Bulgarian Championship and also played for Sporting Huelva in the Spanish Superleague. She first played the European Cup in 2004 with Supersport Sofia.

She is a former member of the Bulgarian national team, and also served as its captain.

On 30 January 2016 she was the first awarded as Bulgarian Women Footballer of the Year for 2015.

== Awards ==
=== Club ===
SuperSport Sofia

- Bulgarian WFC (1): 2003–04

NSA Sofia

- Bulgarian WFC (10): 2005–06, 2006–07, 2007–08, 2008–09, 2009–10, 2010–11, 2011–12, 2012–13, 2013–14, 2014–15
- Bulgarian Cups (7): 2007, 2008, 2009, 2010, 2012, 2013, 2014

=== Individual ===
- Bulgarian Women Footballer of the Year (1): 2015
