= Yoana Papazova =

Bulgarian female footballer

Yoana Papazova Йоана Папазова (Bulgarian)
Personal information
- Full name: Yoana Georgieva Papazova
- Date of birth: 13 August 1992 (age 34)
- Place of birth: Sofia, Bulgaria
- Position: Midfielder

Team information
- Current team: NSA Sofia
- Number: 6

Senior career*
Years	Team	Apps	(Gls)
- NSA Sofia

International career^{‡}
2007–2008	Bulgaria U17	6	(0)
2008–2010	Bulgaria U19	8	(0)
2013–	Bulgaria	4	(0)
- * Club domestic league appearances and goals ‡ National team caps and goals as of 20 September 2020

Yoana Georgieva Papazova (Bulgarian: Йоана Георгиева Папазова; born 13 August 1992) is a Bulgarian footballer who plays as a midfielder for Women's Championship club FC NSA Sofia and the Bulgaria women's national team.

== International career ==
Papazova capped for Bulgaria at senior level in a 3–0 friendly win against Luxembourg on 20 September 2020.
