= Jovana Sretenović =

Serbian footballer (born 1986)

Personal information
- Full name: Jovana Sretenović
- Date of birth: 4 February 1986 (age 40)
- Place of birth: Lazarevac, SFR Yugoslavia
- Height: 1.66 m (5 ft 5 in)
- Position: Forward

Team information
- Current team: AEL
- Number: 11

Senior career*
| Years | Team | Apps | (Gls) |
| –2005 | Sloga Zemun | 150 | (80) |
| 2005–2009 | Mašinac Niš | 117 | (109) |
| 2009–2016 | Elpides Karditsas | | |
| 2010 | → SFK 2000 (loan) | | |
| 2011 | → Olympia Sofia (loan) | 1 | (1) |
| 2016– | AEL | | |

International career
| 2001–2005 | Serbia and Montenegro U19 | 24 | (9) |
| 2004–2013 | Serbia | 41 | (10) |
- * Club domestic league appearances and goals

Jovana Sretenović (Serbian Cyrillic: Јована Сретеновић; born 4 February 1986) is a Serbian football player who played as a forward for Sloga Zemun, Mašinac Niš in the Serbian First League, SFK 2000, Olympia Sofia, Elpides Karditsas, and now plays for Greek side AEL. She was a member of the Serbia women's national football team.

== Club career ==
=== ŽFK Sloga Zemun ===
Sretenović's football career began at Sloga Zemun where she played until the end of 2004–05 season. She made a total of 150 appearances and scored 80 goals for the club.

=== ŽFK Mašinac PZP Niš ===
She debuted for Mašinac Niš in 2005–06 season. Her first appearance in a UEFA Women's Champions League game was on 13 September 2005 against Alma KTZH, when she scored her first of a total of six goals for Mašinac in this tournament. With Mašinac Niš Sretenović was three times champion of Serbia – in 2005–06, 2007–08 and 2008–09 seasons; and won the Serbian Women's Cup in 2007–08 and 2008–09 seasons. She made 117 appearances and scored 109 goals. Sretenović was honoured Best striker in the 14th Naissus Cup football tournament in August 2007, and Best player of the tournament in August 2008. Her most prolific year was 2008, when she took part in all 40 games, spending 3500 minutes on the field, and scoring 40 goals for Mašinac. She was honoured Best striker and Most successful player of the year.

=== Elpides Karditsas ===
Sretenović has played for Elpides Karditsas in the Greek A Division since 2009–10 season, and has been one of the most consistent and important players of the team ever since. Elpides Karditsas finished in second position, behind their main rivals PAOK, in two consecutive seasons – 2011–12 and 2012–13, and then again in 2013–14, giving up the first position to Amazones Dramas.

=== SFK 2000 Sarajevo ===
In August 2010 Sretenović played in two UEFA Women's Champions League matches with Bosnian champions SFK 2000 – against Apollon Limassol and ASA Tel Aviv. She also scored a goal for SFK 2000 in a 6–1 victory in a friendly game against Croatian champions ŽNK Osijek.

=== FC Olympia Sofia ===
In June 2011 Jovana Sretenović played on loan with Olympia Sofia, helping the team win the Bulgarian Women's Cup for the first time in its history. In the final match, played on 15 June 2011, Olympia defeated the Bulgarian league champions NSA Sofia 2–3 at the Vasil Levski National Stadium. Sretenović assisted the first goal and scored the third one. Several days earlier, on 5 June, she had made her debut for Olympia, again scoring against NSA Sofia in a league game.

=== A.E.L. FC ===
Sretenović has been playing with AEL since their promotion to Greek A Division in 2016–17 season.

== International career ==
=== Serbia Under-19 Team ===
Her debut for the Serbia and Montenegro U-19 team in an official game was on 11 April 2001 in a Women's U-19 Euro 2001 qualifier against Norway, lost 1–4. From 2001 to 2005 Sretenović played in 24 games and scored 9 goals.

=== Serbia National Team ===
Sretenović debuted for the Serbia and Montenegro women's national team in a friendly match against Greece in June 2004. Since then she has made a total of no less than 40 appearances and scored 10 goals. Sretenović appeared as a substitute in the second half of the UEFA Women's Euro 2005 qualifier against Italy, played on 25 September 2004. The team of Serbia and Montenegro lost at home 1–2. She took part in all eight Serbia's games in the qualification group for the 2007 FIFA Women's World Cup, but didn't manage to score a goal. The day to put her name on the score sheet was soon to come. Sretenović scored four goals – 2 against Slovenia in a 0–5 away victory on 5 May 2007, and 2 more against Greece in another 0–5 away win on 27 September 2008 – in the qualifiers for the 2009 UEFA Women's Championship. Another three goals were scored by her in friendly matches – 2 against Bulgaria in a 3–1 victory on 9 April 2008, and 1 against Hungary on 2 September 2009. Her only goal in the 2011 FIFA Women's World Cup qualifications was scored in a 4–0 win against Estonia on 31 March 2010. She played in seven games in the qualifying group stage for the 2013 UEFA Women's Championship, where she scored 2 goals – against Slovenia in a 1–2 victory on 22 October 2011, and against Croatia in a 4–2 home win on 19 November 2011. As of 14 February 2014 Jovana Sretenović is the Serbian female player with most appearances (32) in UEFA competitions.

=== Serbia Universiade Team ===
Sretenović was part of the football team which represented Serbia at the XXV Summer Universiade, hosted in Belgrade, Serbia in June–July 2009. She became the team's top scorer with five goals – 2 against Canada, 2 against Hungary, and 1 against Estonia.
