= 2014–15 Bulgarian women's football championship =

Bulgarian women's football championship
- Season: 2014–15
- Champions: FC NSA Sofia (12th title)
- Matches played: 69
- Goals scored: 283 (4.1 per match)

The 2014–15 Bulgarian women's football championship was the 30th season of women's league football under the Bulgarian Football Union.

The season was played from 7 September 2014 to the end of May 2015. The defending champions were NSA Sofia.

FC NSA Sofia won their 12th consecutive championship and qualified to the 2015–16 UEFA Women's Champions League.

== League table ==
Pos	Team	Pld	W	D	L	GF	GA	GD	Pts	Qualification
1	FC NSA Sofia (C)	16	16	0	0	66	6	+60	48	Qualification to Champions League
2	Super Sport	16	14	0	2	65	12	+53	42	
3	Sportika	16	12	0	4	51	12	+39	36	
4	Ekomet 90	16	6	3	7	24	31	−7	21	
5	Beroe	16	5	2	9	26	30	−4	17	
6	Olympia	15	5	2	8	18	29	−11	17	
7	Akademik Sofia	16	3	4	9	14	29	−15	13	
8	Spartak Varna	14	3	1	10	18	35	−17	10	
9	Oborishte	15	0	0	15	1	99	−98	0	

(C) Champions
