= Evelina Traykova =

Bulgarian footballer

Personal information
- Date of birth: 2 November 1986 (age 40)
- Position: Midfielder

Senior career*
Years	Team	Apps	(Gls)
- NSA Sofia

International career^{‡}
2003	Bulgaria U19	1+	(0+)
2009	Bulgaria	2	(0)
- * Club domestic league appearances and goals ‡ National team caps and goals as of 21 November 2009

Evelina Traykova (Bulgarian: Евелина Трайкова; born 2 November 1986) is a Bulgarian footballer who plays as a midfielder. She has been a member of the Bulgaria women's national team.
