= Aleksandra Palagacheva =

Bulgarian footballer

Personal information
- Date of birth: 2 September 2002 (age 24)
- Position: Defender

Team information
- Current team: Lokomotiv Plovdiv

Senior career*
Years	Team	Apps	(Gls)
- Lokomotiv Plovdiv

International career^{‡}
2019	Bulgaria U17	3	(0)
2018–2019	Bulgaria U19	6	(0)
2020–	Bulgaria	1	(0)
- * Club domestic league appearances and goals ‡ National team caps and goals as of 20 September 2020

Aleksandra Palagacheva (Bulgarian: Александра Палагачева; born 2 September 2002) is a Bulgarian footballer who plays as a defender for Women's National Championship club PFC Lokomotiv Plovdiv and the Bulgaria women's national team.

== Club career ==
Palagacheva has played for Lokomotiv Plovdiv in Bulgaria.

== International career ==
Palagacheva represented Bulgaria at the 2019 UEFA Women's Under-17 Championship and two UEFA Women's Under-19 Championship qualifications (2019 and 2020). She made her senior debut on 20 September 2020 in a 3–0 friendly win over Luxembourg.
