= Bulgarian Footballer of the Year =

Annual football award

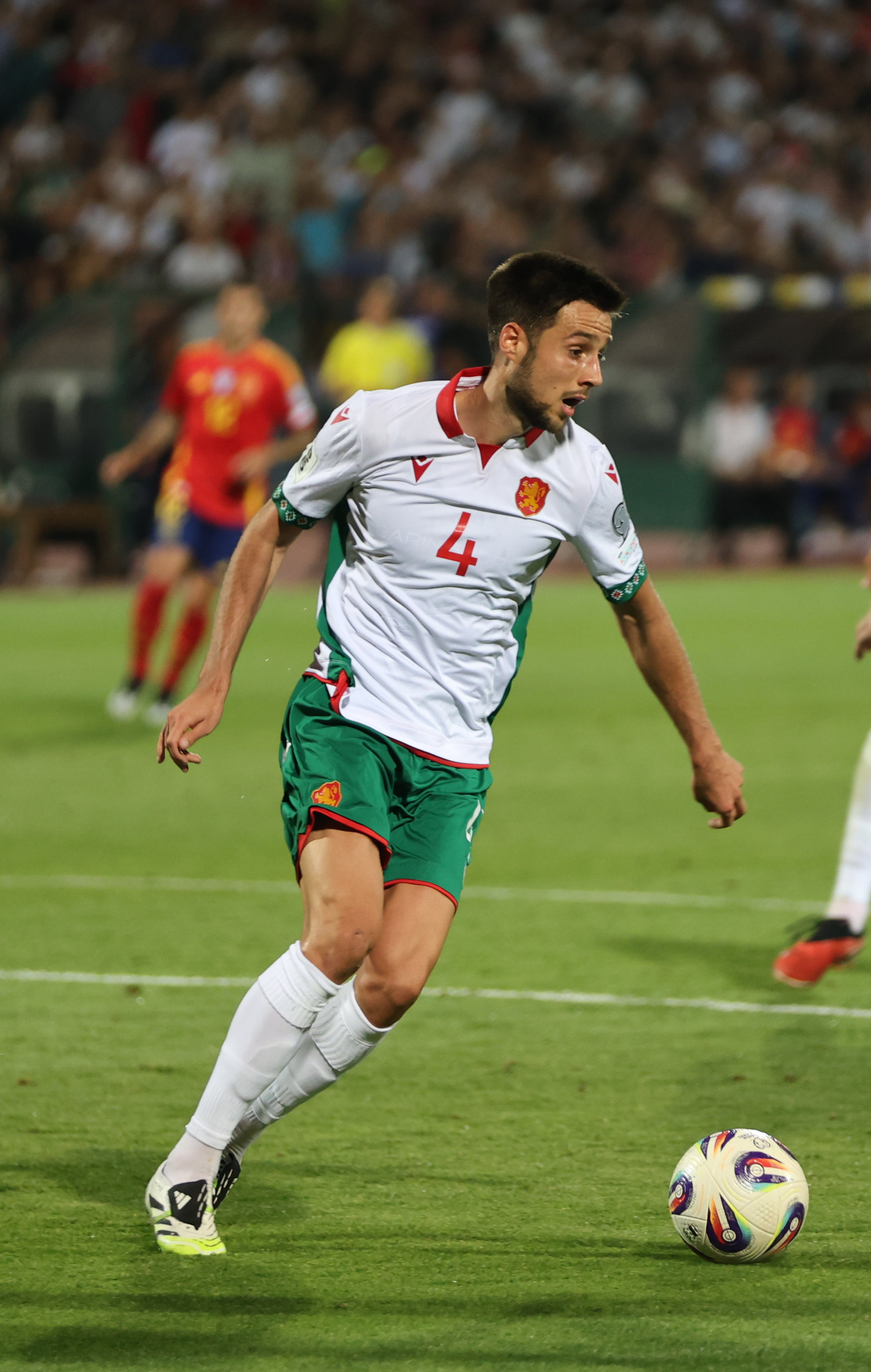
Ilia Gruev is the current prize holder.

Bulgarian Footballer of the Year (Bulgarian: Футболист №1 на България, Futbolist №1 na Balgariya) is an annual title awarded to the best Bulgarian association football player of the year. The award has been given since 1961, and the winner is elected by authorized journalists from the leading Bulgarian media.

== History ==
2011 was the first year with a vote held online by fans. The poll has been organized by the Futbol newspaper (1961–1975), the Start newspaper (1975–1998), the Futbol newspaper and Start magazine (1999–present).

The footballers to have won the award the most times are Dimitar Berbatov (7 times - 2002, 2004, 2005, 2007, 2008, 2009, 2010), Hristo Stoichkov (5 times - 1989, 1990, 1991, 1992, 1994), Kiril Despodov (4 times - 2018, 2021, 2022, 2023), Hristo Bonev (1969, 1972, 1973) and Ivelin Popov (2015, 2016, 2017). The clubs with the most winners are Levski Sofia and CSKA Sofia with 11.

== List of Bulgarian Footballer of the Year ==
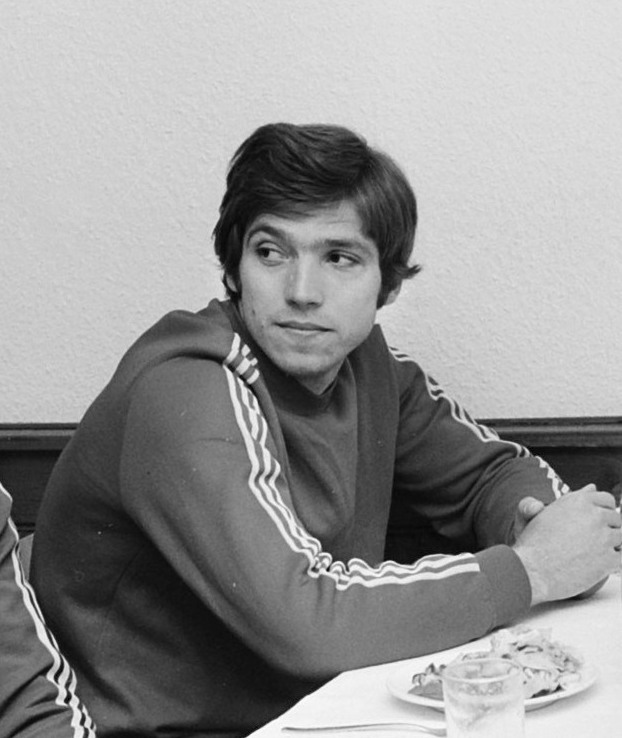
Hristo Bonev was Bulgarian Footballer of the Year for 1969, 1972 and 1973

=== Men ===
Year	Footballer	Position	Club
1961	Georgi Naydenov	Goalkeeper	(Bulgaria) CSKA Sofia
1962	Ivan Kolev	Defender	(Bulgaria) CSKA Sofia
1963	Aleksandar Shalamanov	Defender	(Bulgaria) Slavia Sofia
1964	Nikola Kotkov	Forward	(Bulgaria) Lokomotiv Sofia
1965	Georgi Asparuhov	Forward	(Bulgaria) Levski Sofia
1966	Aleksandar Shalamanov	Defender	(Bulgaria) Slavia Sofia
1967	Dimitar Penev	Defender	(Bulgaria) CSKA Sofia
1968	Simeon Simeonov	Goalkeeper	(Bulgaria) Slavia Sofia
1969	Hristo Bonev	Forward	(Bulgaria) Lokomotiv Plovdiv
1970	Stefan Aladzhov	Defender	(Bulgaria) Levski Sofia
1971	Dimitar Penev	Defender	(Bulgaria) CSKA Sofia
1972	Hristo Bonev	Forward	(Bulgaria) Lokomotiv Plovdiv
1973	Hristo Bonev	Forward	(Bulgaria) Lokomotiv Plovdiv
1974	Kiril Ivkov	Defender	(Bulgaria) Levski Sofia
1975	Kiril Ivkov	Defender	(Bulgaria) Levski Sofia
1976	Bozhidar Grigorov	Forward	(Bulgaria) Slavia Sofia
1977	Pavel Panov	Midfielder / Forward	(Bulgaria) Levski Sofia
1978	Rumyancho Goranov	Goalkeeper	(Bulgaria) Lokomotiv Sofia
1979	Atanas Mihaylov	Forward	(Bulgaria) Lokomotiv Sofia
1980	Andrey Zhelyazkov	Forward	(Bulgaria) Slavia Sofia
1981	Georgi Velinov	Goalkeeper	(Bulgaria) CSKA Sofia
1982	Radoslav Zdravkov	Defender	(Bulgaria) CSKA Sofia
1983	Stoycho Mladenov	Midfielder / Forward	(Bulgaria) CSKA Sofia
1984	Plamen Nikolov	Defender	(Bulgaria) Levski Sofia
1985	Georgi Dimitrov	Defender	(Bulgaria) CSKA Sofia
1986	Borislav Mihaylov	Goalkeeper	(Bulgaria) Levski Sofia
1987	Nikolay Iliev	Defender	(Bulgaria) Levski Sofia
1988	Lyuboslav Penev	Forward	(Bulgaria) CSKA Sofia
1989	Hristo Stoichkov	Midfielder / Forward	(Bulgaria) CSKA Sofia
1990	Hristo Stoichkov	Midfielder / Forward	(Spain) Barcelona
1991	Hristo Stoichkov	Midfielder / Forward	(Spain) Barcelona
1992	Hristo Stoichkov	Midfielder / Forward	(Spain) Barcelona
1993	Emil Kostadinov	Forward	(Portugal) Porto
1994	Hristo Stoichkov	Midfielder / Forward	(Spain) Barcelona
1995	Krasimir Balakov	Midfielder	(Portugal) Sporting CP / (Germany) VfB Stuttgart
1996	Trifon Ivanov	Defender	(Austria) Rapid Wien
1997	Krasimir Balakov	Midfielder	(Germany) VfB Stuttgart
1998	Ivaylo Yordanov	Defender / Midfielder / Forward	(Portugal) Sporting CP
1999	Aleksandar Aleksandrov	Midfielder	(Bulgaria) Levski Sofia
2000	Georgi Ivanov	Forward	(Bulgaria) Levski Sofia
2001	Georgi Ivanov	Forward	(Bulgaria) Levski Sofia
2002	Dimitar Berbatov	Forward	(Germany) Bayer Leverkusen
2003	Stiliyan Petrov	Midfielder	(Scotland) Celtic
2004	Dimitar Berbatov	Forward	(Germany) Bayer Leverkusen
2005	Dimitar Berbatov	Forward	(Germany) Bayer Leverkusen
2006	Martin Petrov; 2nd Dimitar Berbatov; 3rd Stiliyan Petrov	Midfielder / Forward; Forward; Midfielder	(Spain) Atlético Madrid (England) Tottenham Hotspur (England) Aston Villa
2007	Dimitar Berbatov; 2nd Martin Petrov; 3rd Georgi Petkov	Forward; Midfielder / Forward; Goalkeeper	(England) Tottenham Hotspur (England) Manchester City (Bulgaria) Levski Sofia
2008	Dimitar Berbatov; 2nd Georgi Petkov; 3rd Blagoy Georgiev	Forward; Goalkeeper; Midfielder	(England) Manchester United (Bulgaria) Levski Sofia (Bulgaria) Slavia Sofia
2009	Dimitar Berbatov; 2nd Stiliyan Petrov; 3rd Blagoy Georgiev	Forward; Midfielder; Midfielder	(England) Manchester United (England) Aston Villa (Russia) Terek Grozny
2010	Dimitar Berbatov; 2nd Ivelin Popov; 3rd Nikolay Mihaylov	Forward; Forward; Goalkeeper	(England) Manchester United (Turkey) Gaziantepspor (Netherlands) Twente
2011	Nikolay Mihaylov; 2nd Stiliyan Petrov; 3rd Dimitar Berbatov	Goalkeeper; Midfielder; Forward	(Netherlands) Twente (England) Aston Villa (England) Manchester United
2012	Georgi Milanov; 2nd Ivan Ivanov; 3rd Stanislav Manolev	Midfielder; Defender; Defender	(Bulgaria) Litex Lovech (Serbia) Partizan (Netherlands) PSV
2013	Ivan Ivanov; 2nd Ivelin Popov; 3rd Svetoslav Dyakov	Defender; Midfielder; Midfielder	(Switzerland) Basel / (Serbia) Partizan (Russia) Kuban Krasnodar (Bulgaria) Ludogorets Razgrad
2014	Vladislav Stoyanov; 2nd Svetoslav Dyakov; 3rd Dimitar Berbatov	Goalkeeper; Midfielder; Forward	(Bulgaria) Ludogorets Razgrad (Bulgaria) Ludogorets Razgrad (France) Monaco
2015	Ivelin Popov; 2nd Ivaylo Chochev; 3rd Georgi Milanov	Forward; Midfielder; Midfielder	(Russia) Spartak Moscow (Italy) Palermo (Russia) CSKA Moscow
2016	Ivelin Popov; 2nd Svetoslav Dyakov; 3rd Vladislav Stoyanov	Forward; Midfielder; Goalkeeper	(Russia) Spartak Moscow (Bulgaria) Ludogorets Razgrad (Bulgaria) Ludogorets Razgrad
2017	Ivelin Popov; 2nd Martin Kamburov; 3rd Todor Nedelev	Forward; Forward; Midfielder	(Russia) Spartak Moscow (Bulgaria) Beroe Stara Zagora (Bulgaria) Botev Plovdiv
2018	Kiril Despodov; 2nd Georgi Petkov; 3rd Todor Nedelev	Forward; Goalkeeper; Midfielder	(Bulgaria) CSKA Sofia (Bulgaria) Slavia Sofia (Bulgaria) Botev Plovdiv
2019	Dimitar Iliev; 2nd Anton Nedyalkov; 3rd Vasil Bozhikov	Forward; Defender; Defender	(Bulgaria) Lokomotiv Plovdiv (Bulgaria) Ludogorets Razgrad (Slovakia) Slovan Bratislava
2020	Dimitar Iliev; 2nd Valentin Antov; 3rd Anton Nedyalkov	Forward; Defender; Defender	(Bulgaria) Lokomotiv Plovdiv (Bulgaria) CSKA Sofia (Bulgaria) Ludogorets Razgrad
2021	Kiril Despodov; 2nd Martin Kamburov; 3rd Georgi Yomov	Forward; Forward; Midfielder	(Bulgaria) Ludogorets Razgrad (Bulgaria) Beroe Stara Zagora (Bulgaria) CSKA Sofia
2022	Kiril Despodov; 2nd Ilia Gruev; 3rd Ivaylo Chochev	Forward; Midfielder; Midfielder	(Bulgaria) Ludogorets Razgrad (Germany) Werder Bremen (Bulgaria) CSKA 1948
2023	Kiril Despodov; 2nd Ilia Gruev; 3rd Ivaylo Chochev	Forward; Midfielder; Midfielder	(Greece) PAOK (England) Leeds United (Bulgaria) Ludogorets Razgrad
2024	Kiril Despodov; 2nd Ilia Gruev; 3rd Dimitar Mitov	Forward; Midfielder; Goalkeeper	(Greece) PAOK (England) Leeds United (Scotland) Aberdeen
2025	Ilia Gruev; 2nd Ivaylo Chochev; 3rd Kiril Despodov	Midfielder; Midfielder; Midfielder	(England) Leeds United (Bulgaria) Ludogorets Razgrad (Greece) PAOK

=== Youth ===
Year	Footballer	Position	Club
2014	Bozhidar Kraev	Midfielder	(Bulgaria) Levski Sofia
2015	Bozhidar Kraev	Midfielder	(Bulgaria) Levski Sofia
2016	Petko Hristov	Defender	(Bulgaria) Slavia Sofia
2017	Kiril Despodov	Forward	(Bulgaria) CSKA Sofia
2018	Valentin Antov	Defender	(Bulgaria) CSKA Sofia
2019	Stanislav Ivanov	Forward	(Bulgaria) Levski Sofia
2020	Dominik Yankov	Midfielder	(Bulgaria) Botev Vratsa / Ludogorets
2021	Svetoslav Vutsov	Goalkeeper	(Bulgaria) Slavia Sofia
2022	Nikola Iliev	Midfielder	(Italy) Inter Milan
2023	Hristiyan Petrov	Defender	(Bulgaria) CSKA Sofia

=== Women ===
Year	Footballer	Position	Club
2015	Silvia Radoyska	Midfielder	(Bulgaria) NSA Sofia
2016	Evdokiya Popadinova	Forward	(United States) Northwestern Ohio Racers
2017	Evdokiya Popadinova	Forward	(United States) Northwestern Ohio Racers
2018	Evdokiya Popadinova	Forward	(United States) Florida Gulf Coast Eagles
2019	Evdokiya Popadinova	Forward	(United States) Florida Gulf Coast Eagles
2020	Evdokiya Popadinova	Forward	(Italy) Napoli Femminile
2021	Simona Petkova	Midfielder	(Switzerland) FC Lugano
2022	Simona Petkova	Midfielder	(Switzerland) YB Frauen
2023	Evdokiya Popadinova	Forward	(Italy) Lazio Women 2015
2024	Evdokiya Popadinova	Forward	(Italy) Lazio Women 2015 / (Australia) Brisbane Roar

== Statistics ==
=== Multiple winners ===
Winner	Number of wins	Winning years
Dimitar Berbatov	7	2002, 2004, 2005, 2007, 2008, 2009, 2010
Hristo Stoichkov	5	1989, 1990, 1991, 1992, 1994
Kiril Despodov	5	2018, 2021, 2022, 2023, 2024
Hristo Bonev	3	1969, 1972, 1973
Ivelin Popov	3	2015, 2016, 2017
Krasimir Balakov	2	1995, 1997
Georgi Ivanov	2	2000, 2001
Kiril Ivkov	2	1974, 1975
Dimitar Penev	2	1967, 1971
Dimitar Iliev	2	2019, 2020

=== Winners by league ===
Country	Winners	Clubs featured
Bulgaria	39	Levski (11), CSKA (11), Lokomotiv Plovdiv (5), Slavia Sofia (5), Lokomotiv Sofia (3), Ludogorets Razgrad (3), Litex Lovech (1)
Germany	5	Bayer Leverkusen (3), Stuttgart (2)
Spain	5	Barcelona (4), Atlético Madrid (1)
England	4	Manchester United (3), Tottenham Hotspur (1)
Portugal	3	Sporting (2), Porto (1)
Russia	3	Spartak Moscow (3)
Austria	1	Rapid Wien (1)
Greece	2	PAOK (2)
Netherlands	1	Twente (1)
Scotland	1	Celtic (1)
Serbia	1	Partizan (1)
Switzerland	1	Basel (1)

== See also ==
- A PFG Player of the Season
- A PFG Young Player of the Season
- Bulgarian Sportsperson of the Year
