= Veni Sarbinska =

Bulgarian footballer

Veni Sarbinska Вени Сърбинска (Bulgarian)
Personal information
- Full name: Veni Dona Dimitrova Sarbinska
- Date of birth: 28 December 1995 (age 30)
- Position: Defender

Senior career*
Years	Team	Apps	(Gls)
- NSA Sofia

International career^{‡}
2011	Bulgaria U17	3	(0)
2012–2013	Bulgaria U19	6	(0)
2012–	Bulgaria	4	(0)
- * Club domestic league appearances and goals ‡ National team caps and goals as of 7 May 2014

Veni Dona Dimitrova Sarbinska (Bulgarian: Вени Дона Димитрова Сърбинска; born 28 December 1995) is a Bulgarian footballer who plays as a defender and the Bulgaria women's national team.
