= Nikoleta Voyskova =

Bulgarian footballer

Personal information
- Date of birth: 22 September 1988 (age 38)
- Position: Defender

Senior career*
Years	Team	Apps	(Gls)
- NSA Sofia

International career^{‡}
2004–200?	Bulgaria U19	5	(0)
2009–2012	Bulgaria	16	(0)
- * Club domestic league appearances and goals ‡ National team caps and goals as of 21 June 2012

Nikoleta Voyskova (Bulgarian: Николета Войскова; born 22 September 1988) is a Bulgarian footballer who plays as a defender. She has been a member of the Bulgaria women's national team.
