= Simona Stoyanova =

Bulgarian female footballer

Personal information
- Full name: Simona Petrova Stoyanova
- Date of birth: 28 March 2004 (age 22)
- Place of birth: Spain
- Position: Midfielder

Team information
- Current team: NSA Sofia
- Number: 15

Youth career
- FC Etar

Senior career*
Years	Team	Apps	(Gls)
2018–2023	Etar	100	(10)
2023–	NSA Sofia		

International career^{‡}
2019–	Bulgaria U17	6	(0)
2019–	Bulgaria	1	(0)
- * Club domestic league appearances and goals ‡ National team caps and goals as of 8 October 2019

Simona Stoyanova (Bulgarian: Симона Стоянова; born 28 March 2004) is a Bulgarian footballer who plays as a midfielder for Women's National Championship club FC Etar Veliko Tarnovo and the Bulgaria women's national team.

== International career ==
Stoyanova capped for Bulgaria at senior level in a 0–6 friendly loss to Croatia on 14 June 2019.
