= Nora Dimitrova =

Bulgarian footballer

Nora Dimitrova Нора Димитрова (Bulgarian)
Personal information
- Full name: Nora Kirilova Dimitrova
- Date of birth: 26 July 1996 (age 30)
- Position: Defender

Team information
- Current team: Lokomotiv Stara Zagora
- Number: 5

Senior career*
Years	Team	Apps	(Gls)
- NSA Sofia
- Lokomotiv Stara Zagora

International career^{‡}
2013–2014	Bulgaria U19	5	(0)
2019–	Bulgaria	17	(1)
- * Club domestic league appearances and goals ‡ National team caps and goals as of 14 June 2019

Nora Kirilova Dimitrova (Bulgarian: Нора Кирилова Димитрова; born 26 July 1996) is a Bulgarian footballer who plays as a defender for Women's National Championship club Lokomotiv Stara Zagora and the Bulgaria women's national team.

== International career ==
Dimitrova capped for Bulgaria at senior level in a 0–6 friendly loss to Croatia on 14 June 2019.

== International goals ==
No.	Date	Venue	Opponent	Score	Result	Competition
1.	6 April 2023	Boyana Sports Complex, Sofia, Bulgaria	Lithuania	2–0	3–0	Friendly
