= 2015–16 Bulgarian women's football championship =

Bulgarian women's football championship
- Season: 2015–16
- Champions: FC NSA Sofia (13th title)
- Matches: 90
- Goals: 482 (5.36 per match)

The 2015–16 Bulgarian women's football championship was the 31st season of women's league football under the Bulgarian Football Union.

The season was played from 5 September 2015 to the end on 28 May 2016. The defending champions were NSA Sofia.

FC NSA Sofia won their 13th consecutive championship and qualified to the 2016–17 UEFA Women's Champions League.

== League table ==
Pos	Team	Pld	W	D	L	GF	GA	GD	Pts	Qualification
1	NSA Sofia (C)	18	17	1	0	123	6	+117	52	Qualification to UEFA Women's Champions League
2	Super Sport Sofia	18	15	0	3	93	16	+77	45	
3	Sportika Blagoevgrad	18	14	1	3	71	22	+49	43	
4	Ekomet 90 Plovdiv	18	9	3	6	51	22	+29	30	
5	Bolyarki Veliko Tarnovo	18	9	3	6	45	24	+21	30	
6	Beroe Stara Zagora	18	5	2	11	20	44	−24	17	
7	Sevlievo Ladies	18	4	4	10	21	53	−32	16	
8	WFC Varna	18	4	2	12	29	64	−35	14	
9	Akademik Sofia	18	2	3	13	18	58	−40	9	
10	Burgos Ladies	18	1	1	16	11	173	−162	4	

(C) Champions
