= 2023–24 Bulgarian Women's League =

Bulgarian Women's League
- Season: 2023–24

The 2023–24 Bulgarian Women's League is the 31st season of women's league football under the Bulgarian Football Union. Lokomotiv Stara Zagora are the 2-time defending champions.

== Teams ==
As in the last season, 14 teams will compete in the league this year. Two new teams were joined in the league: Dunav Ruse and the returning Rial Kovachevtsi. On 26 August 2023 WFC Varna was bought by Ludogorets Razgrad owners and was transformed into the women's team of Ludogorets. On 24 October Svetkavitsa Gradezhnitsa and Rial Kovachevtsi were expelled from the league due to financial problems with their results being annulled.

== 2023–24 Teams ==
Team	Location	Stadium	Capacity (seating)
Dunav	Ruse	Gradski Stadion	13,000
Enko	Plovdiv	Plovdiv Stadium	1,000
Etar	Veliko Tarnovo	Ivaylo Stadium	25,000
LP Super Sport	Sofia	German Stadium	2,000
Lokomotiv	Stara Zagora	Lokomotiv	2,000
Ludogorets	Razgrad	Eagles' Nest	2,000
NSA Sofia	Sofia	NSA Stadium	1,000
Pirin	Blagoevgrad	Hristo Botev	7,500
Paldin	Plovdiv	Paldin Stadium	1,000
Sevlievo Ladies	Sevlievo	Rakovski Stadium	5,000
Sportika	Blagoevgrad	Hristo Botev	7,500
Sofia Ladies 2021	Sofia	Stadion Akademik	2,000
Svetkavitsa Gradezhnitsa	Gradezhnitsa	Gradezhnitsa Stadium	1,000
Rial Kovachevtsi	Kovachevtsi	Dimitrovets Stadium	1,000

== League table ==
Pos	Team	Pld	W	D	L	GF	GA	GD	Pts	Qualification
1	NSA Sofia (C)	22	21	1	0	88	10	+78	64	Qualification to UEFA Women's Champions League
2	Lokomotiv Stara Zagora	22	20	1	1	118	25	+93	61	
3	Sportika Blagoevgrad	22	14	3	5	89	22	+67	45	
4	Paldin Plovdiv	22	14	2	6	61	23	+38	44	
5	LP Super Sport Sofia	22	12	2	8	41	31	+10	38	
6	Sevlievo Ladies	22	10	4	8	37	47	−10	34	
7	Ludogorets Razgrad	22	8	3	11	47	39	+8	27	
8	Pirin Blagoevgrad	22	6	2	14	20	47	−27	20	
9	Etar	22	5	4	13	24	53	−29	19	
10	Enko Plovdiv	22	5	3	14	20	59	−39	18	
11	Dunav Ruse	22	2	4	16	14	64	−50	10	
12	Sofia Ladies 2021	22	0	1	21	9	148	−139	1	
13	Rial Kovachevtsi	0	0	0	0	0	0	0	0	Disqualified
14	Svetkavitsa Gradezhnitsa	0	0	0	0	0	0	0	0	Disqualified

Updated to match(es) played on 4 April 2024. Source: https://bulgarian-football.com/zhenski-futbol.html
(C) Champions

== Season statistics ==
=== Top scorers ===
Rank	Player	Club	Goals
1	(Ukraine) Anastasiia Skorynina	Lokomotiv Stara Zagora	35
2	(Bulgaria) Monika Baliova	Sportika	23
3	(Austria) Vanessa Gajdek	Ludogorets Razgrad	19
4	(Bulgaria) Mariela Petrova	Paldin Plovdiv	17
5	(Australia) Jessica Coates	NSA Sofia	16
5	(Bulgaria) Polina Rasina	NSA Sofia	16
7	(Bulgaria) Nikol Damyanova	Paldin Plovdiv	13
8	Katerina Ravnachka	Lokomotiv Stara Zagora	11
8	(Bulgaria) Teodora Mitova	Paldin Plovdiv	11
10	(Bulgaria) Preslava Ivanova	Sportika	10
10	(Bulgaria) Silviya Naidenova	Sevlievo Ladies	10
10	(Bulgaria) Veni Dona Sarbinska	Sportika	10
10	(Bulgaria) Ivet Vasileva	Super Sport	10
