= List of Bulgaria women's international footballers =

This is a non-exhaustive list of Bulgaria women's international footballers – association football players who have appeared at least once for the senior Bulgaria women's national football team.

== Players ==
Key
**Bold**	Named to the national team in the past year

Name	Caps	Goals	National team years	Club(s)
Yuliana Aleksandrova	2	0	2019–	(Bulgaria) NSA
Valentina Asenova	9	0	2012–	(Bulgaria) NSA
Andriana Boyanova	6	1	2009–2010	Unknown
**Nikoleta Boycheva**	9	0	2011–	(Bulgaria) Lokomotiv Plovdiv
**Nora Dimitrova**	1	0	2019–	(Bulgaria) NSA
**Viktoria Dimova**	1	0	2019–	(Bulgaria) NSA
**Yana Dineva**	1	0	2019–	(Bulgaria) Lokomotiv Stara Zagora
Zlatka Gaberova	5	0	2010–2012	Unknown
Valentina Gospodinova	23	2	2009–2014	Unknown
**Veronika Gotseva**	3	0	2014–	(Bulgaria) Lokomotiv Plovdiv
Stefani Iotova	1	0	2012	Unknown
Krastina Ivanova	1	0	2011	Unknown
**Yanitsa Ivanova**	1	0	2019–	(Bulgaria) NSA
Borislava Kireva	24	2	2009–2014	Unknown
**Velina Koshuleva**	21	1	2009–	(Bulgaria) Lokomotiv Plovdiv
**Liliana Kostova**	25	3	2009–	(Poland) Czarni Sosnowiec
Aneliya Kukunova	1	0	2012	Unknown
Tsvetana Mancheva	1	0	2011	Unknown
Lidiya Nacheva	17	0	2011–2014	Unknown
**Ivana Naydenova**	2	1	2019–	(Bulgaria) NSA
Korneliya Naydenova	11	0	2009–2011	Unknown
**Aleksandra Palagacheva**	1	0	2020–	(Bulgaria) Lokomotiv Plovdiv
Antoaneta Pancheva	8	0	2009–2013	Unknown
**Yoana Papazova**	4	0	2013–	(Bulgaria) NSA
Bilyana Pencheva	1	0	2019	Unknown
**Teya Penkova**	1	0	2020–	(Bulgaria) NSA
Petya Petkova	12	0	2009–2011	Unknown
**Simona Petkova**	7	0	2012–	(Switzerland) Lugano
Diana Petrakieva	9	0	2010–2014	(Bulgaria) NSA
**Lora Petrova**	1	0	2019–	(Switzerland) Lugano
Kristina Petrunova	17	0	2011–2014	Unknown
**Evdokiya Popadiynova**	4	1	2014–	(Italy) Napoli
Polina Rasina	1	0	2019–	(Bulgaria) Pirin Blagoevgrad
**Monika Razhgeva**	11	0	2010–	(Bulgaria) NSA
**Roksana Shahanska**	16	0	2011–	(Bulgaria) NSA
Vanesa Stoycheva	1	0	2019–	(Bulgaria) NSA

== See also ==
- Bulgaria women's national football team
