= Balkan Women's Football League =

- Ženska Fudbalska Liga Balkana
- Formation: 2012
- Region served: Balkan
- Products: Football

The Balkan Women's Football League (Serbian: Ženska Fudbalska Liga Balkana) is a supranational championship for women's football clubs from Balkan countries. The inaugural edition is scheduled to start on 11 October 2012, with eight teams from Albania, Bosnia and Herzegovina, Bulgaria, Macedonia, Montenegro, Romania and Serbia. The competition is also open to Croatian, Greek, Serbian and Turkish clubs.

== 2012-13 teams ==
- (Albania) Tirana
- (Bosnia and Herzegovina) 2000 Sarajevo
- (Bulgaria) Sportika Blagoevgrad
- (North Macedonia) Biljanini Izvori
- (North Macedonia) Pobeda Prilep
- (Montenegro) Podgorica
- (Romania) Real Craiova
- (Serbia) Masinac Nis

== 2015-16 teams ==
- 1st place (Serbia) Masinac Nis
- 2nd place (Greece) PAOK
- 3rd place (Romania) CS Navobi Iasi
- 4th place (Bulgaria) Olympia Sofia
- 5th place (Greece) Mixed Thrace
