= WFC Paldin Plovdiv =

Paldin Plovdiv
- Full name: Women Football Club Paldin Plovdiv
- Founded: 31 June 2016; 9 years ago
- Ground: Trud Stadium, Trud, Plovdiv Province
- Capacity: 1,000
- Manager: Angel Slavov
- League: Bulgarian Women's League
- 2024–25: 5th
Home colours	Away colours

Women Football Club Paldin Plovdiv (Bulgarian: Женски Футболен Клуб Пълдин Пловдив), or simple WFC Paldin (Bulgarian: ЖФК Пълдин) is a Bulgarian women's football club from the city of Plovdiv that competes in the Bulgarian Women's League, the top tier of Women's football in Bulgaria.

== History ==
In 2015 in Plovdiv, Paldin Academy was established. In 2016 they started their women's team and joined Bulgarian Women's League. On 4 March 2019, Atanaska Kumanova debuted for the team at the age of 12, to become one of the youngest players to play for Bulgarian women's team in the league. In 2019 the U15 team become a record cup champions for 4th time without considering a goal in the tournament. In the end of 2019, Lokomotiv Plovdiv took over the team and finished the 2019–20 season under Lokomotiv colors, securing their highest league position as runner-ups. However, for the next season, Paldin returned as a new team in the league, with all the players and staff from the previous team stayed with Lokomotiv. In 2021 few players and the manager, Angel Slavov, returned in Paldin, after WFC Lokomotiv had financial problems and despite finishing as runner-ups in 2020–21, the team was dissolved.

== Honours ==
Bulgarian Women's League

- Runners-up (1): 2019–20

== Players ==
=== First-team squad ===
As of 26 August 2023

Note: Flags indicate national team as defined under FIFA eligibility rules; some limited exceptions apply. Players may hold more than one non-FIFA nationality.

No.	Pos.	Nation	Player
1	GK	BUL	Darena Radeva
3	DF	BUL	Yordanka Parnarova
5	DF	BUL	Karena Markova
6	FW	BUL	Mariela Markova
8	MF	BUL	Plamena Pencheva
9	MF	BUL	Nikol Dimanova
11	MF	BUL	Kristiana Dimitrova
12	GK	BUL	Ognyana Burgodzhieva
13	MF	BUL	Teodora Mitova

No.	Pos.	Nation	Player
14	FW	BUL	Teodora Paraskevova
15	MF	BUL	Nikol Mitskova
16	DF	BUL	Aleksandra Marinova
18	MF	BUL	Katrin Koleva
20	DF	BUL	Tsvetelina Slavcheva
22	DF	BUL	Diana-Mihaela Atanasova (captain)
23	FW	BUL	Miroslava Peykova
77	MF	BUL	Mariela Petrova
99	FW	BUL	Margarita Shopova

== Personnel ==
=== Manager history ===
Dates	Name	Honours
2019–	(Bulgaria) Angel Slavov	

== Seasons ==
Results of league and cup competitions by season
Season	League											Women's Cup	Other competitions
Season	Division	Level	P	W	D	L	F	A	GD	Pts	Pos	Women's Cup	Other competitions
2016–17	Bulgarian Women's Championship	1	20	4	1	15	24	105	-81	13	10th	DNQ	
2017–18	Bulgarian Women's Championship	1	20	7	1	12	35	57	-22	22	8th	DNQ	
2018–19	Bulgarian Women's Championship	1	18	9	3	6	27	27	+0	30	4th	Semi-finals	
2019–20	Bulgarian Women's Championship	1	16	12	1	3	43	19	+24	37	2nd	not held	
2020–21	Bulgarian Women's Championship	1	26	3	1	22	19	96	–77	10	13th	DNQ	
2021–22	Bulgarian Women's League	1	22	10	2	10	48	54	–6	32	6th	Semi-finals	
2022–23	Bulgarian Women's League	1	24	11	2	11	48	61	–13	35	8th	not held	
2023–24	Bulgarian Women's League	1	22	14	2	6	61	23	+38	44	4th		
2024–25	Bulgarian Women's League	1	22	12	2	8	45	32	+13	38	5th		
2025–26	Bulgarian Women's League	1											

Notes

Key

Champions	Runners-up	Third place
