= WFC Lokomotiv Stara Zagora =

WFC Lokomotiv
- Full name: WFC Lokomotiv Stara Zagora
- Founded: 1989; 36 years ago 2018; 7 years ago (refounded)
- Ground: Lokomotiv Stadium
- Capacity: 12 000
- Manager: Yanko Valkanov
- League: Bulgarian Women's League
- 2024-25: 3rd
Home colours	Away colours

Women Football Club Lokomotiv Stara Zagora (Bulgarian: Женски Футболен Клуб Локомотив Стара Загора), is a Bulgarian women's football club from Stara Zagora, founded in 1989. The club currently competes in the top tier of Bulgarian Women's League football, Bulgarian Women's League. The team have won the league 3 times.

== History ==
PFC Lokomotiv Stara Zagora started their women division in 1989 and joined in the Bulgarian Women's Football Championship, winning the title in 1991–92. Shortly after that, the team was dissolved along most of female teams in Bulgaria.

In 2018 a women's team was re-established after Beroe's folding of the women's league. The team slowly solidified in the league and in 2022 they become champions, ending FC NSA Sofia hegemony after 17 conservative championships. The team qualified for UEFA Women's Champions League for first time in their history. On 18 August 2022 they lost their opening match against Dinamo-BGU Minsk. On 11 July 2023 Loko won their second conservative title.

== Honours ==
Bulgarian Women's League

- : Winners (3): 1991–92, 2021–22; 2022–23

== First-team squad ==
As of 8 September 2023

Note: Flags indicate national team as defined under FIFA eligibility rules; some limited exceptions apply. Players may hold more than one non-FIFA nationality.

No.	Pos.	Nation	Player
1	GK	BUL	Aleksandra Hristova
2	DF	BUL	Petya Petkova
3	DF	BUL	Yanitsa Ivanova
4	DF	UKR	Oleksandra Babiuk
5	DF	BUL	Nora Dimitrova
6	DF	BUL	Maria Dikelova
7	MF	BUL	Yana Dineva
9	FW	BUL	Yuliana Aleksandrova
10	FW	BUL	Bilyana Pencheva
12	GK	BUL	Roksana Shahanska
13	DF	BUL	Pamela Raycheva
15	FW	SVK	Lenka Wienerová

No.	Pos.	Nation	Player
16	FW	BUL	Kristiyana Minkova
17	MF	BUL	Ekaterina Zheleva
18	DF	BUL	Zhasmina Atanasova
19	FW	BUL	Mariya Dimitrova
20	MF	BUL	Teodora Yordanova
21	MF	BUL	Nina Georgieva
22	MF	BUL	Katerina Maria Ravnachka
23	MF	UKR	Anastasiia Skorynina
27	DF	BUL	Nikoleta Boycheva
41	DF	BUL	Mariela Nedeva
90	MF	UKR	Yulia Gnydyuk

== Seasons ==
Results of league and cup competitions by season
Season	League											Bulgarian Cup	Other competitions		Top goalscorer	
Season	Division	Level	P	W	D	L	F	A	GD	Pts	Pos	Bulgarian Cup	Other competitions		Top goalscorer	
2018–19	Bulgarian Women's Championship	1	18	5	3	10	24	33	–9	18	8th	QR				
2019–20	Bulgarian Women's Championship	1	16	7	2	7	29	26	+3	23	4th	not held				
2020–21	Bulgarian Women's Championship	1	26	19	3	4	116	17	+99	60	3rd	Quarterfinals				
2021–22	Bulgarian Women's League	1	15	15	0	0	110	3	+107	45	1st	Runner-up				
2022–23	Bulgarian Women's League	1	24	24	0	0	183	3	+180	72	1st	not held	UEFA Women's Champions League	QR1		
2023–24	Bulgarian Women's League	1	22	20	1	1	118	25	+93	61	2nd		UEFA Women's Champions League	QR1	(Ukraine) Anastasiia Skorynina	35
2024–25	Bulgarian Women's League	1	22	14	4	4	65	15	+50	46	3rd				(Bulgaria) Raya Boneva	14
2025–26	Bulgarian Women's League	1														

Key

Champions	Runners-up	Third place	Promoted	Relegated

== European record ==
As of match played 10 September 2023

Competition	Played	Won	Drew	Lost	GF	GA	GD	Win%
UEFA Women's Champions League	4	1	1	2	5	11	−6	25.00
Total	4	1	1	2	5	11	−6	25.00

=== Matches ===
Season	Competition	Stage	Result	Opponent
2022–23	UEFA Women's Champions League	Qualifying Round 1	0–5	(Belarus) Dinamo-BGU Minsk
2022–23	UEFA Women's Champions League	Qualifying Round 1	5–1	(North Macedonia) ŽFK Ljuboten
2023–24	UEFA Women's Champions League	Qualifying Round 1	0–5	(Norway) Brann
2023–24	UEFA Women's Champions League	Qualifying Round 1	0–0 (1–3 p.)	(Poland) Katowice
