= Ratka Živković =

Serbian footballer (born 1975)

Personal information
- Full name: Ratka Živković
- Date of birth: 4 January 1975 (age 51)
- Place of birth: Vranje, SFR Yugoslavia
- Position: Midfielder

Senior career*
Years	Team	Apps	(Gls)
–	Yumco Vranje		
–2004	Mašinac Niš		
2004	Fjölnir	9	(2)
2004	KR	5	(3)
2009–2011	Olympia Sofia		

International career
1991–2004	Serbia and Montenegro	86	
- * Club domestic league appearances and goals

Ratka Živković (Serbian Cyrillic: Ратка Живковић; born 4 January 1975) is a retired Serbian football player. Amongst the teams she played for were Yumco Vranje, Mašinac Niš in the Serbian First League, Fjölnir and KR in Iceland, and Bulgarian Olympia Sofia. She was a member of the Serbia and Montenegro women's national football team.
