= Bulgaria women's national under-19 football team =

National association football team

Bulgaria Women's U-19
- Association: BFU
- Confederation: UEFA (Europe)
- Head coach: Angel Slavov
- FIFA code: BUL

First international
- Bulgaria 1–1 Faroe Islands; 2 October 2002

Biggest win
- Gibraltar 0–7 Bulgaria; 11 November 2022; Bulgaria 7–0 Liechtenstein; 2 April 2025

Biggest defeat
- Norway 9–0 Bulgaria; 17 September 2011; Switzerland 9–0 Bulgaria; 15 September 2014; Czech Republic 9–0 Bulgaria; 21 October 2017

UEFA Women's Under-19 Championship
- Appearances: 0

FIFA U-20 World Cup
- Appearances: 0

Bulgaria women's national under-19 football team represents Bulgaria at the UEFA Women's Under-19 Championship and the FIFA U-20 Women's World Cup.

== History ==
=== UEFA Women's Under-19 Championship ===
The Bulgarian team has never qualified for the UEFA Women's Under-19 Championship finals.

Year	Round	Pld	W	D	L	GF	GA	Squad
Two-legged final 1998	did not qualify							
(Sweden) 1999	did not qualify							
(France) 2000	did not qualify							
(Norway) 2001	did not qualify							
(Sweden) 2002	did not qualify							
(Germany) 2003	did not qualify							
(Finland) 2004	did not qualify							
(Hungary) 2005	did not qualify							
(Switzerland) 2006	did not qualify							
(Iceland) 2007	did not qualify							
(France) 2008	did not qualify							
(Belarus) 2009	did not qualify							
(North Macedonia) 2010	did not qualify							
(Italy) 2011	did not qualify							
(Turkey) 2012	did not qualify							
(Wales) 2013	did not qualify							
(Norway) 2014	did not qualify							
(Israel) 2015	did not qualify							
(Slovakia) 2016	did not qualify							
(Northern Ireland) 2017	did not qualify							
(Switzerland) 2018	did not qualify							
(Scotland) 2019	did not qualify							
(Georgia (country)) ~~2020~~	Cancelled due to the COVID-19 pandemic							
(Belarus) ~~2021~~	Cancelled due to the COVID-19 pandemic							
(Czech Republic) 2022	did not qualify							
(Belgium) 2023	did not qualify							
(Lithuania) 2024	did not qualify							
(Poland) 2025	did not qualify							
(Bosnia and Herzegovina) 2026	did not qualify							
(Hungary) 2027	TBD							
Total	2/26	7	3	1	3	6	10	

== Results and fixtures ==
The following is a list of match results in the last 12 months, as well as any future matches that have been scheduled.

Legend

Win Draw Lose Fixture

=== 2025 ===
26 November 2026 UEFA European Under-19 Championship qualification	Poland	3–0	Bulgaria	Albena, Bulgaria
11:00 UTC+2	Piekarska 13'; Langosz 62'; Nsangou 67'	Report		Stadium: Albena 1 Referee: Anastasia Mylopoulou (Greece)

29 November 2026 UEFA European Under-19 Championship qualification	Sweden	2–0	Bulgaria	Albena, Bulgaria
10:00 UTC+2	Sjöström 10'; Mihaleva 90+4' (o.g.)	Report		Stadium: Albena 1 Referee: Olivia Tschon (Austria)

2 December 2026 UEFA European Under-19 Championship qualification	Bulgaria	1–4	Republic of Ireland	Albena, Bulgaria
13:00 UTC+2	Boneva 45+2'	Report	Butler 16', 41'; Wollmer 25'; Healy 34'	Stadium: Albena 1 Referee: Anastasia Mylopoulou (Greece)

=== 2026 ===
9 April 2026 UEFA European Under-19 Championship qualification	Bulgaria	5–1	Kazakhstan	Ta' Qali, Malta
12:00 UTC+3 (11:00 local time)	Petrova 9', 53'; Boneva 22'; Baliova 45+3'; Boyadzhieva 58'	Report	Medvedeva 32'	Stadium: Centenary Stadium; Referee: Jelena Kumer (Croatia)

12 April 2026 UEFA European Under-19 Championship qualification	Bulgaria	6–0	Malta	Ta' Qali, Malta
15:30 UTC+3 (14:30 local time)	Petrova 11', 77'; Ravnachka 39', 53' (pen.); Baliova 70'; Halyanova 87'	Report		Stadium: Centenary Stadium; Referee: Gamze Durmuş (Turkey)

15 April 2026 UEFA European Under-19 Championship qualification	Israel	5–2	Bulgaria	Ta' Qali, Malta
12:00 UTC+3 (11:00 local time)	Tamar 21', 70'; Goulden 80', 85'; T. Mor 87' (pen.)	Report	Ravnachka 24' (pen.); Petrova 90+4'	Stadium: National Stadium; Referee: Gamze Durmuş (Turkey)

== Current squad ==
The following players were named to the squad to take part in the 2026 UEFA European Under-19 Championship Qualifiers for the games against Kazakhstan, Malta & Israel in April 2026.

Head coach: Angel Slavov

No.	Pos.	Player	Date of birth (age)	Club
1	GK	Ognyana Burgodzhieva	22 March 2008 (age 18)	(Bulgarian Football Union) Paldin Plovdiv
12	GK	Anabel Nikolova	25 November 2008 (age 17)	(Bulgarian Football Union) NSA Sofia
2	DF	Elena Kamenova	31 January 2007 (age 19)	(Football Federation of Macedonia) Kamenica Sasa
3	DF	Yordanka Parnarova	5 June 2007 (age 19)	(Bulgarian Football Union) Paldin Plovdiv
4	DF	Ivana Chalakova	9 May 2008 (age 18)	(Bulgarian Football Union) Sportika Blagoevgrad
5	DF	Gergana Halyanova	12 March 2008 (age 18)	(Bulgarian Football Union) Sportika Blagoevgrad
16	DF	Ana Tserovska	9 October 2007 (age 19)	(Bulgarian Football Union) Sportika Blagoevgrad
6	MF	Vesela Kalinova	22 July 2008 (age 18)	(Bulgarian Football Union) LP Super Sport
8	MF	Silyana Mihaleva	11 April 2008 (age 18)	(Bulgarian Football Union) Paldin Plovdiv
15	MF	Nikol Mitskovska	4 January 2007 (age 19)	(Bulgarian Football Union) Paldin Plovdiv
18	MF	Michelle Muddiman	5 December 2007 (age 18)	(Football Association of Ireland) DLR Waves
19	MF	Dalia Videnova	7 February 2008 (age 18)	(Bulgarian Football Union) NSA Sofia
20	MF	Hristina Milcheva	2 December 2008 (age 17)	(Bulgarian Football Union) LP Super Sport
22	MF	Rumyana Dambalova	12 March 2008 (age 18)	(Bulgarian Football Union) Pirin Blagoevgrad
7	FW	Monika Baliova	29 April 2008 (age 18)	(Bulgarian Football Union) Sportika Blagoevgrad
9	FW	Mariela Petrova	11 August 2007 (age 19)	(Bulgarian Football Union) Ludogorets Razgrad
10	FW	Raya Boneva	22 August 2007 (age 19)	(Bulgarian Football Union) WFC Lokomotiv
11	FW	Katerina-Maria Ravnachka	23 March 2008 (age 18)	(Bulgarian Football Union) WFC Lokomotiv
13	FW	Teodora Mitova	25 November 2008 (age 17)	(Bulgarian Football Union) Paldin Plovdiv
14	FW	Andrea Boyadzhieva	30 November 2007 (age 18)	(German Football Association) Wacker München

== See also ==
- Bulgaria women's national football team
- Bulgaria women's national under-17 football team
