= Svetoslav Dyakov =

Bulgarian professional footballer

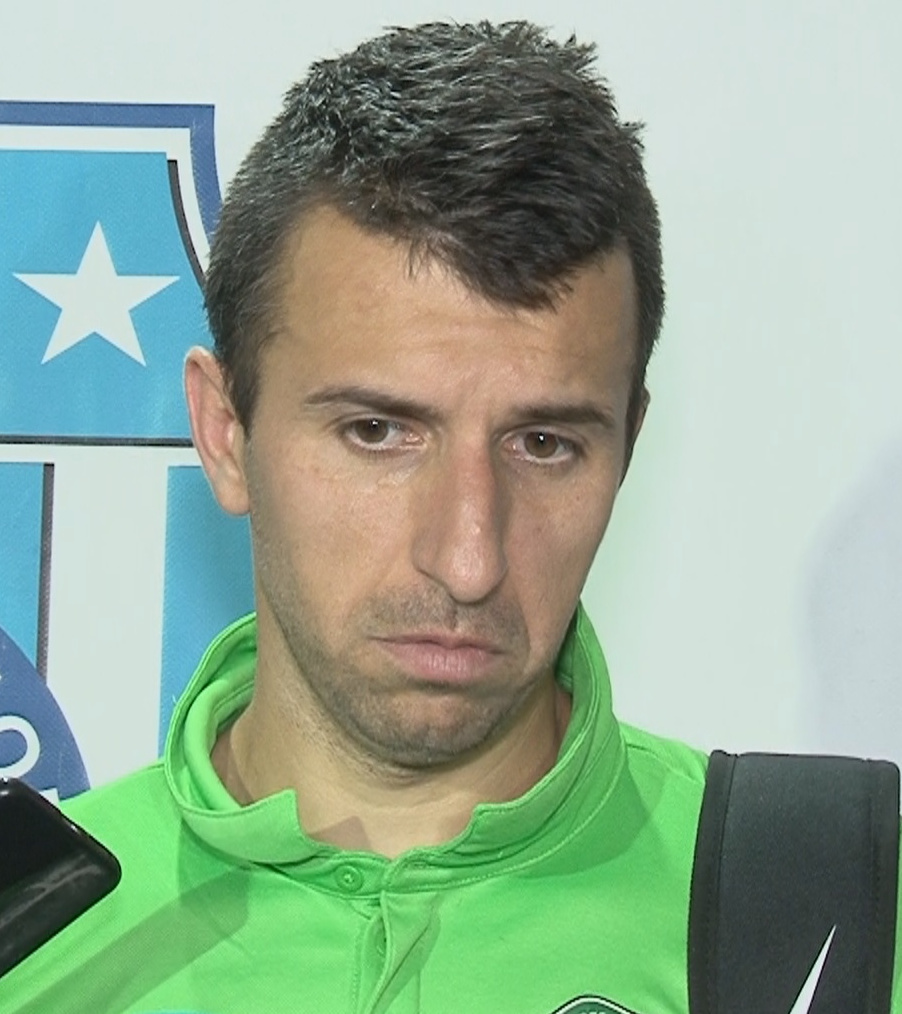
- Dyakov in 2019

Personal information
- Full name: Svetoslav Atanasov Dyakov
- Date of birth: 31 May 1984 (age 42)
- Place of birth: Blagoevgrad, Bulgaria
- Height: 1.76 m (5 ft 9 in)
- Position: Central midfielder

Youth career
- Pirin Blagoevgrad

Senior career*
Years	Team	Apps	(Gls)
2002–2005	Pirin Blagoevgrad	73	(2)
2005–2008	Pirin 1922	62	(9)
2008–2011	Lokomotiv Sofia	79	(2)
2011–2021	Ludogorets Razgrad	242	(7)
2015–2021	Ludogorets Razgrad II	4	(0)
2021–2022	Pirin Blagoevgrad	24	(0)
Total		484	(20)

International career^{‡}
2004–2005	Bulgaria U21	2	(0)
2012–2017	Bulgaria	36	(0)

Managerial career
- 2022: Pirin Blagoevgrad (caretaker)
- 2022–2024: Ludogorets Razgrad (assistant)
- * Club domestic league appearances and goals as of 17:34, 23 May 2022 (UTC) ‡ National team caps and goals as of 12 June 2017 (UTC)

Svetoslav Dyakov (Bulgarian: Светослав Дяков; born 31 May 1984) is a Bulgarian professional retired footballer who played as a midfielder, and now a manager. He was the club captain of Ludogorets Razgrad and, between 2015 and 2017, was the captain of the national team as well.

== Career ==
Born in Blagoevgrad, Dyakov began his football career with a local club, Pirin. In 2005, he signed with Pirin 1922.

=== Lokomotiv Sofia ===
On 18 June 2008, Dyakov became Lokomotiv Sofia's first summer signing. He signed a three-year contract. He made his debut on 9 August 2008, in a 1–0 away win over Minyor Pernik. Dyakov made a further 24 league appearances in the 2008–09 season without scoring.

His first goal came in a 3–0 home win against Sliven 2000 on 6 November 2010. During his three years at Lokomotiv, Dyakov made 79 appearances, scoring two goals.

=== Ludogorets Razgrad ===
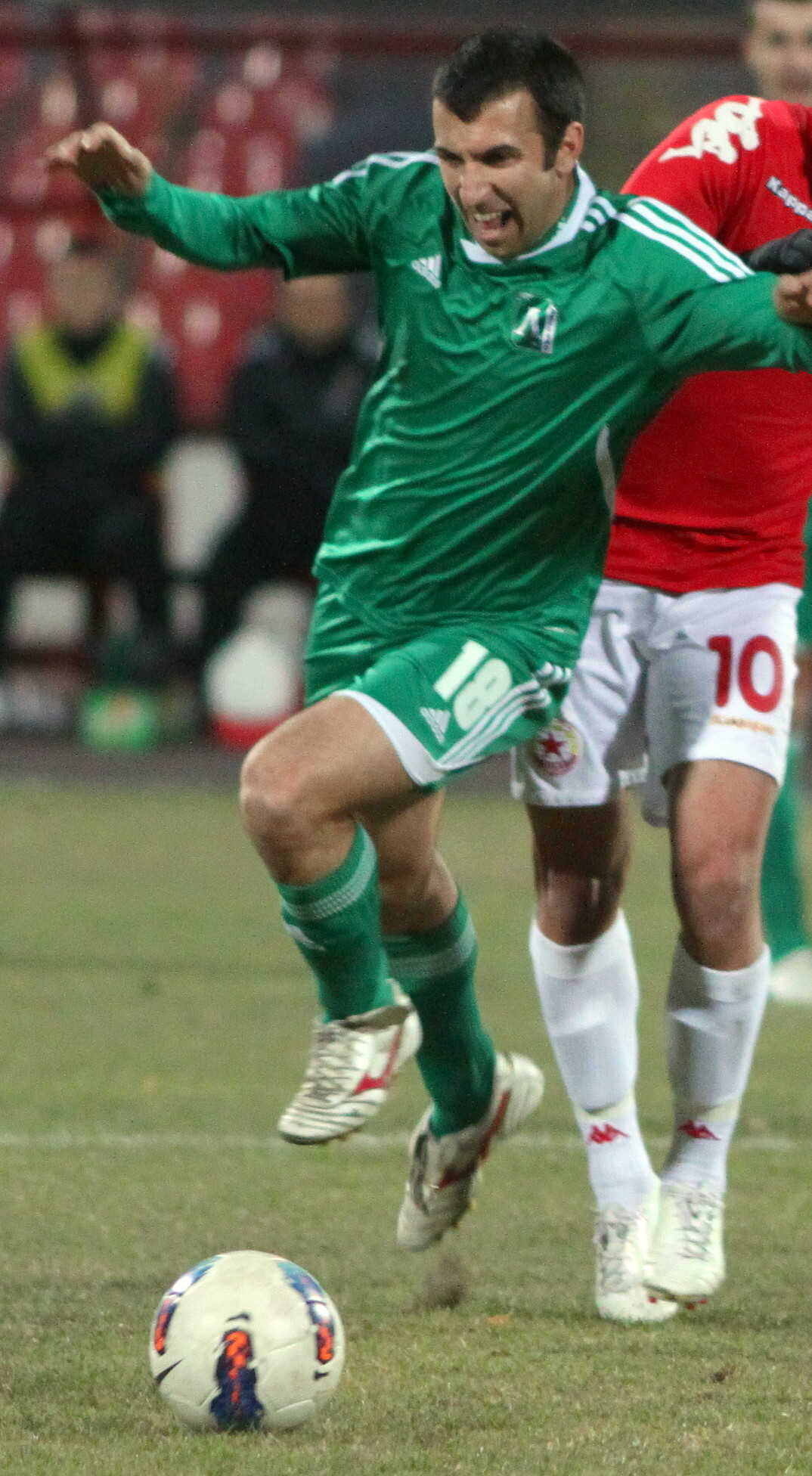
Dyakov playing for Ludogorets in 2011

After his contract with Lokomotiv expired, Dyakov joined Ludogorets Razgrad on a free transfer. He signed a two-year contract on 4 June 2011. Dyakov made his league debut against Lokomotiv Plovdiv in a 0–0 home draw on 6 August. He enjoyed a successful first season at Ludogorets and quickly established himself as a first team regular. On 19 May 2012, Dyakov scored his first goal as a Ludogorets player in the team's league match against Kaliakra Kavarna after scoring a penalty. Ludogorets won the match 4–0. In his first season with Ludogorets, Dyakov collected his first A Group title winner's medal. He also won for first time in his career Bulgarian Cup and Bulgarian Supercup.

On 18 June 2013, Dyakov was appointed the club captain of Ludogorets for the 2013–14 season. He scored his first-ever European goal on 3 October, in a 3–0 home win over Dinamo Zagreb in the group stage of Europa League. On 19 December, he was named the best midfielder of the year in Bulgaria. On 4 October 2018, Dyakov was in the starting line-up for Ludogorets in a 1–0 away loss against FC Zürich in the group stage of the UEFA Europa League and together with teammate Cosmin Moți became the player with the joint most appearances for (a) Bulgarian team(s) in European club tournaments, alongside Hristo Yovov whose record of 66 matches they equaled. He has (as of 14 April 2020) made 79 appearances (78 in the colors of Ludogorets and one as a footballer of Lokomotiv Sofia), trailing teammate Marcelinho who has 80 (all for Ludogorets). In May 2020, Dyakov extended his contract with the team.

On 19 May 2021, Ludogorets announced that Dyakov would leave the club after almost ten years of service, offering him a position in the club administrative, but Dyakov showed a desire to play for one more season at another club, before retiring and joining Ludogorets' technical body.

=== Return to Pirin ===
In May 2021, Dyakov announced that he would join Pirin, the team where he started his career, which had just gotten promoted to the First League. He officially retired on 21 May 2022, when he played his last match against Botev Vratsa, when he was substituted in the 18th minute, his playing number for the most of his career.

== International career ==
On 14 February 2012, Dyakov was called up to the Bulgaria squad, for their friendly fixture against Hungary. Two weeks later, he marked his international début at the age of 27, with an assist to a Valeri Bojinov goal in the 1–1 draw at ETO Park. On 11 September 2012, Dyakov was sent off for a second yellow card in a 2014 World Cup qualifier against Armenia that was won 1–0 by Bulgaria. On 11 October 2013, he received a red card after being cautioned twice against the same opponent – Bulgaria lost the match held in Yerevan 2–1. On 7 February 2015, Dyakov captained his country in the 0–0 draw with Romania in a non-official friendly match, as Ivelin Popov and Nikolay Bodurov were absent from the team.

== Personal life ==
Dyakov is also enrolled as a student at the South-West University, where he is pursuing coaching studies.

== Career statistics ==
=== Club ===
As of 18 May 2021

Appearances and goals by club, season and competition
Club	Season	League		Cup / Supercup		Europe		Total	
Club	Season	Apps	Goals	Apps	Goals	Apps	Goals	Apps	Goals
Pirin	2002–03	20	1	2	1	–		22	2
Pirin	2003–04	24	1	3	0	–		27	1
Pirin	2004–05	29	0	1	0	–		30	0
Pirin	Total	73	2	6	1	–		79	3
Pirin Blagoevgrad	2005–06	12	1	1	0	–		13	1
Pirin Blagoevgrad	2006–07	23	5	2	1	–		25	6
Pirin Blagoevgrad	2007–08	27	3	2	0	–		29	3
Pirin Blagoevgrad	Total	62	9	5	1	–		67	10
Lokomotiv Sofia	2008–09	25	0	1	0	1	0	27	0
Lokomotiv Sofia	2009–10	27	0	2	0	–		29	0
Lokomotiv Sofia	2010–11	27	2	1	0	–		28	2
Lokomotiv Sofia	Total	79	2	4	0	1	0	84	2
Ludogorets Razgrad	2011–12	29	1	4	0	–		33	1
Ludogorets Razgrad	2012–13	28	3	0	0	2	0	30	3
Ludogorets Razgrad	2013–14	22	2	4	1	14	1	40	4
Ludogorets Razgrad	2014–15	24	0	5	1	11	0	40	1
Ludogorets Razgrad	2015–16	26	0	1	0	2	0	29	0
Ludogorets Razgrad	2016–17	22	1	3	0	14	0	39	1
Ludogorets Razgrad	2017–18	23	0	2	0	12	1	37	1
Ludogorets Razgrad	2018–19	30	0	3	0	14	0	47	0
Ludogorets Razgrad	2019–20	22	0	3	0	9	0	34	0
Ludogorets Razgrad	2020–21	19	0	2	0	0	0	21	0
Ludogorets Razgrad	Total	242	7	27	2	78	2	350	11
Career total		456	20	42	4	79	2	580	26

=== International ===
As of 12 November 2017

Appearances and goals by national team and year
National team	Year	Apps	Goals
Bulgaria	2012	8	0
Bulgaria	2013	7	0
Bulgaria	2014	6	0
Bulgaria	2015	6	0
Bulgaria	2016	8	0
Bulgaria	2017	1	0
Total		36	0

== Honours ==
Ludogorets

- Bulgarian League (10): 2011–12, 2012–13, 2013–14, 2014–15, 2015–16, 2016–17, 2017–18, 2018–19, 2019–20, 2020–21
- Bulgarian Cup: 2011–12, 2013–14
- Bulgarian Supercup: 2012, 2014, 2018, 2019

Individual

- Best midfielder in the league: 2013, 2014
- Bulgarian Footballer of the Year: second place 2014, 2016; third place 2013
- Razgrad Sportsman of the year: 2014
