= Evdokiya Popadinova =

Bulgarian footballer (born 1996)

Evdokiya Popadiynova Евдокия Попадинова
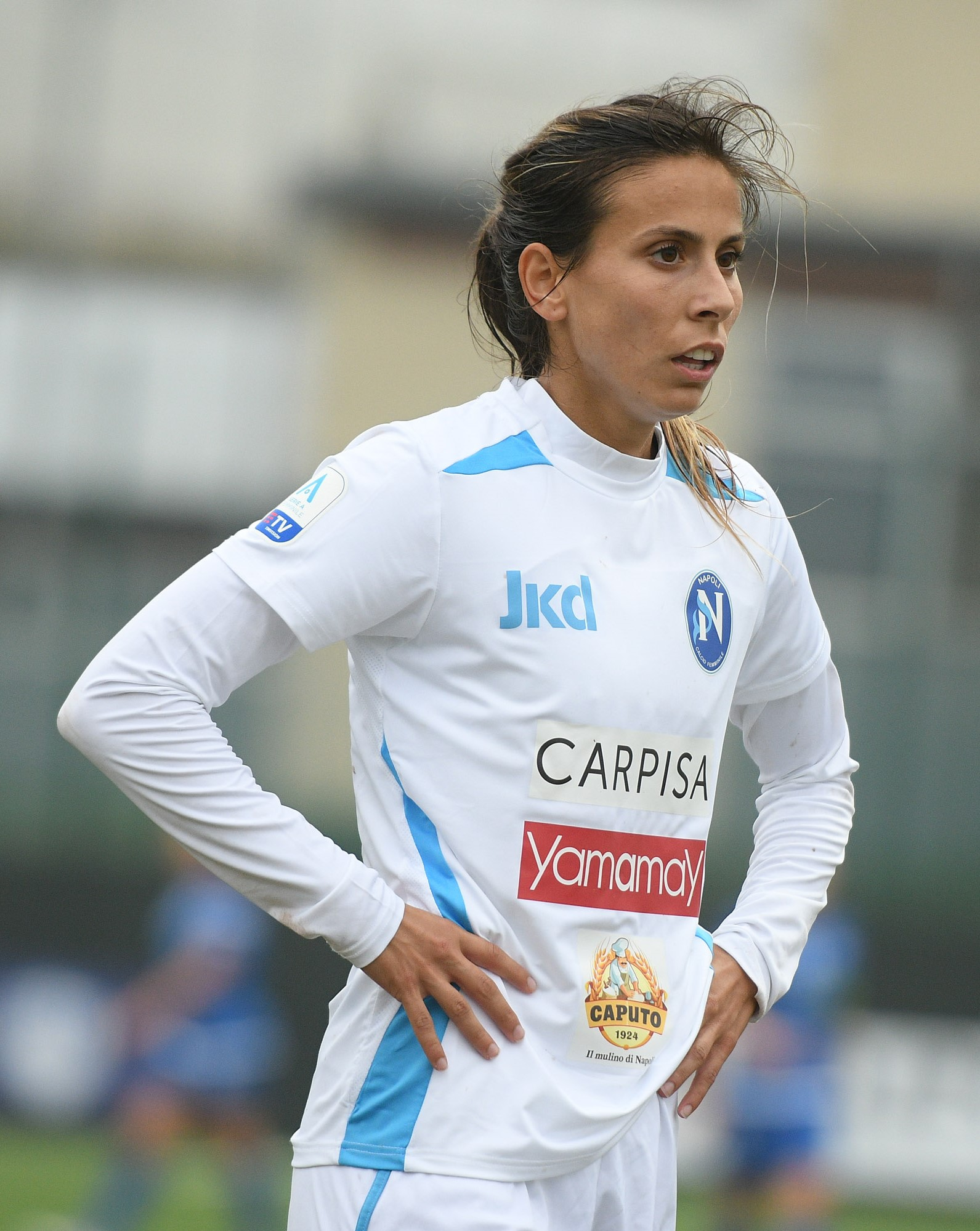
- Popadinova in 2020

Personal information
- Full name: Evdokiya Dimitrova Popadiynova
- Date of birth: 26 October 1996 (age 30)
- Place of birth: Hadzhidimovo, Bulgaria
- Height: 1.63 m (5 ft 4 in)
- Position: Forward

Team information
- Current team: FC Rapperswil–Jona

Youth career
- Sportika Blagoevgrad

College career
| Years | Team | Apps | (Gls) |
| 2016–2017 | UNOH Racers | 44 | (36) |
| 2018–2019 | Florida Gulf Coast Eagles | 33 | (22) |

Senior career*
| Years | Team | Apps | (Gls) |
| 2013–2015 | Sportika Blagoevgrad | | |
| 2015 | Bristol Academy | 4 | (0) |
| 2016 | London Bees | 13 | (3) |
| 2017 | Detroit Sun | | |
| 2018–2020 | Santa Clarita Blue Heat | | |
| 2020 | AaB | 4 | (1) |
| 2020–2022 | Napoli | 23 | (4) |
| 2022–2023 | Sassuolo | 6 | (1) |
| 2023–2024 | Lazio | 23 | (7) |
| 2024–2025 | Brisbane Roar | 18 | (1) |
| 2025 | Beşiktaş | 5 | (0) |
| 2026 | AEK | 6 | (0) |
| 2026– | Rapperswil–Jona | | |

International career
| 2011 | Bulgaria U17 | 3 | (2) |
| 2012–2014 | Bulgaria U19 | 10 | (5) |
| 2014– | Bulgaria | 18 | (8) |
- * Club domestic league appearances and goals as of 24 July 2026

Evdokiya Dimitrova Popadiynova (Bulgarian: Евдокия Димитрова Попадинова, born 26 October 1996) is a Bulgarian professional footballer who plays as a forward for Swiss Women's Super League club FC Rapperswil–Jona.

== Club career ==
=== Early years ===
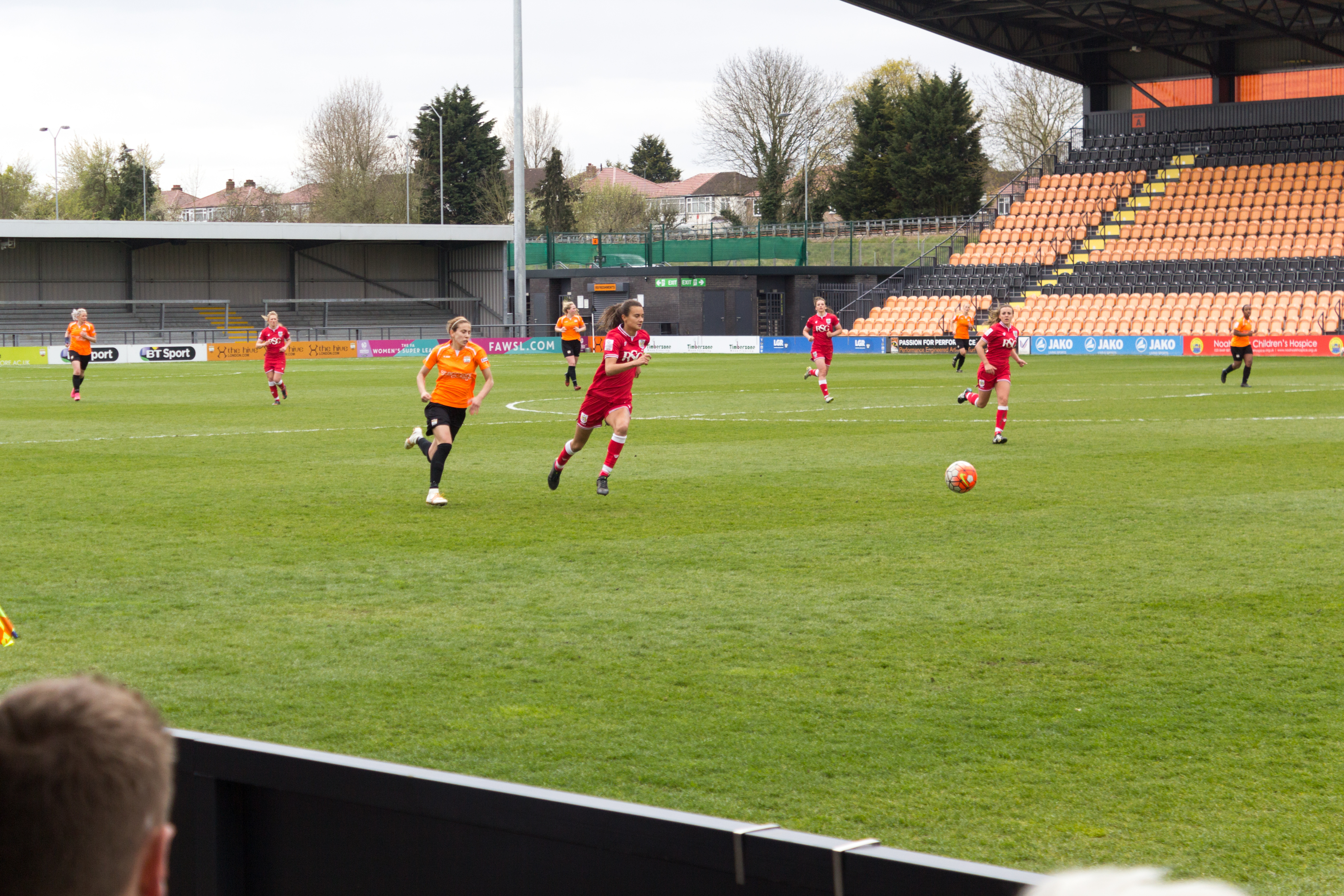
Popadinova (L) playing for London Bees

Popadinova was bornin Hadzhidimovo, Bulgaria. She played for Sportika Blagoevgrad in her home country before moving to England to sign with Bristol Academy. In doing so, she was the first Bulgarian to make an appearance in the FA WSL. In March 2016, Popadinova signed with FA WSL 2 team London Bees.

=== College ===
In 2016, Popadinova enrolled at the University of Northwestern Ohio to play for the Racers in the Division II National Association of Intercollegiate Athletics program. After two years in June 2018, Popadinova transferred to play with the Florida Gulf Coast Eagles in NCAA Division I. Ahead of her senior season, Popadinova was named on the MAC Hermann Trophy watchlist, one of only two players from her conference.

=== AaB ===
In August 2020, Popadinova signed a professional contract with Danish club AaB. She scored one goal in the four matches she played for the club.

=== Italy ===
In November 2020, Popadinova moved to Italy, signing with Napoli. A couple of days later, she made her debut in a 2–1 loss to AC Milan. After scoring four goals in 13 matches during her first season, she signed a one-year contract extension with Napoli in July 2021.

In July 2022, Popadinova signed for Sassuolo.

After one season, in August 2023, Popadinova joined Lazio. She scored four goals for the club in 14 matches, helping them win the Serie B title and earn promotion to the 2024–25 Serie A.

=== Brisbane Roar ===
In August 2024, Popadinova joined Australian club Brisbane Roar. In November, in her first match for the club, she scored her first goal during a 3–2 loss to Canberra United. In May 2025, the club announced Popadinova would leave at the expiration of her contract.

=== Beşiktaş ===
On 16 August 2025, Popadinova signed to the Turkish club Beşiktaş J.K..

== International career ==
At age 16, Popadinova made her senior debut for Bulgaria on 20 August 2013, coming on as a substitute to score in the 4–2 away win over Macedonia in a friendly match.

== Career statistics ==
| No. | Date | Venue | Opponent | Score | Result | Competition |
|---|---|---|---|---|---|---|
| 1. | 14 June 2021 | TFF Riva Facility, Istanbul, Turkey | Turkey | 1–3 | 1–3 | Friendly |
| 2. | 15 February 2023 | Gold City Sports Complex, Alanya, Turkey | Hong Kong | 1–0 | 2–0 | 2023 Turkish Women's Cup |
| 3. | 18 February 2023 | Gold City Sports Complex, Alanya, Turkey | North Macedonia | 2–1 | 2–1 | 2023 Turkish Women's Cup |
| 4. | 21 February 2023 | Gold City Sports Complex, Alanya, Turkey | Kosovo | 1–1 | 1–2 | 2023 Turkish Women's Cup |
| 5. | 9 April 2024 | Stadion Aleksandar Shalamanov, Sofia, Bulgaria | Armenia | 2–2 | 2–3 | UEFA Women's Euro 2025 qualifying |

== Honours ==
Lazio

- Serie B: 2023–24

Individual

- Bulgarian Women Footballer of the Year (8): 2016, 2017, 2018, 2019, 2020, 2023, 2024, 2025
- WHAC Newcomer of the Year: 2016
- WHAC Offensive Player of the Year: 2017
- NAIA First Team All-American: 2016, 2017
- ASUN Women's Soccer All-Decade Team (2010–19)
