= Women Football Club Varna =

WFC Varna
- Full name: Women Football Club Varna
- Nickname: The Swedes
- Founded: 1982; 44 years ago as Grand Hotel Varna
- Dissolved: 2023; 3 years ago transform into WFC Ludogorets Razgrad
- Ground: NSB Sport Palace Stadium
- Capacity: 1,000
- 2022–23: Bulgarian Women's League, 10th
Home colours	Away colours

Women Football Club Varna (Bulgarian: Женски Футболен Клуб Варна), or simple WFC Varna (Bulgarian: ЖФК Варна) was a Bulgarian women's football club from the city of Varna.

== History ==
=== Grand Hotel Varna: 1982–2009 ===
It was founded in 1982 and competes in the Bulgarian women's football championship since its establishment in 1985–86. The team won the title ten times in ten consecutive seasons – from 1994 to 2003; won the Bulgarian Women's Cup six times; and the Albena Cup in 1994. Grand Hotel Varna participated in the qualifying round of the 2001–02 UEFA Women's Cup competition.

=== WFC Varna, Spartak and return to WFC Varna: 2009–2023 ===
The team changed their name to WFC Varna in 2009, and eventually joined under Spartak Varna management in 2012 to become WFC Spartak Varna and moving to a new ground – Spartak Stadium in Varna. In 2015 the team returned to WFC Varna name, after splitting from Spartak, but kept playing on Spartak Stadium.

On 26 August 2023 the main team was announced to become the woman's team of Ludogorets Razgrad and was moved to Razgrad. The team kept his youth teams and continued in the youth leagues.

=== Chronology of the names ===
Year(s)	Name(s)
1982–2009	Grand Hotel Varna
2009–2012	WFC Varna
2012–2015	Spartak Varna
2015–present	WFC Varna

== Titles ==
=== Official ===
- Bulgarian women's championship
- Winners (10): 1993–94, 1994–95, 1995–96, 1996–97, 1997–98, 1998–99, 1999–00, 2000–01, 2001–02, 2002–03
- Runners-up (2): 1992–93, 2003–04
- Bulgarian Women's Cup
- Winners (6): 1990–91, 1994–95, 1997–98, 1998–99, 1999–00, 2001–02

=== Invitational ===
- Albena Cup (1)
  - Winner: 1994

== Seasons ==
Results of league and cup competitions by season
Season	League											Women's Cup	Other competitions	
Season	Division	Level	P	W	D	L	F	A	GD	Pts	Pos	Women's Cup	Other competitions	
1993–94	Women's State Championship	1									2nd			
1993–94	Women's State Championship	1									1st			
1994–95	Women's State Championship	1									1st	Winners		
1995–96	Women's State Championship	1									1st			
1996–97	Women's State Championship	1									1st			
1997–98	Women's State Championship	1									1st	Winners		
1998–99	Women's State Championship	1									1st	Winners		
1999–00	Women's State Championship	1									1st	Winners		
2000–01	Women's State Championship	1									1st	Runner-up		
2001–02	Women's State Championship	1									1st	Winners	UEFA Women's Cup	Group Stage
2002–03	Women's State Championship	1									1st			
2003–04	Women's State Championship	1									2nd			
2004–05	Women's State Championship	1									3rd			
2005–06	Women's State Championship	1									3rd			
2006–07	Women's State Championship	1									3rd			
2007–08	Women's State Championship	1	16	11	2	5	51	28	+23	35	4th			
2008–09	Women's State Championship	1	14	7	2	5	25	26	–1	23	4th			
2009–10	Bulgarian Women's Championship	1	16	6	2	8	31	28	+3	37	6th			
2010–11	Bulgarian Women's Championship	1	14	2	1	11	10	46	–36	7	8th			
2011–12	Bulgarian Women's Championship	1	Did not participate											
2012–13	Bulgarian Women's Championship	1	16	6	2	8	23	22	+1	20	6th	Quarterfinals		
2013–14	Bulgarian Women's Championship	1	14	5	2	7	19	29	–10	17	4th	Semifinals		
2014–15	Bulgarian Women's Championship	1	14 (Note: Withdrew at halfway stage)	3	1	10	18	35	–17	10	8th			
2015–16	Bulgarian Women's Championship	1	18	4	2	12	29	64	–35	14	8th	Quarterfinals		
2016–17	Bulgarian Women's Championship	1	20	4	3	13	15	70	–65	15	9th			
2017–18	Bulgarian Women's Championship	1	20	3	3	14	24	61	–37	12	9th			
2018–19	Bulgarian Women's Championship	1	10	1	0	9	14	72	–58	1	10th			
2019–20	Bulgarian Women's Championship	1	Did not participate											
2020–21	Bulgarian Women's Championship	1	26	7	0	19	26	82	–58	21	11th			
2021–22	Bulgarian Women's League	1	19	5	1	13	19	56	–37	16	12th			
2022–23	Bulgarian Women's League	1	24	6	2	16	34	64	–30	20	10th			

Notes

Key

Champions	Runners-up	Third place	Promoted	Relegated

== European tournaments history ==
Season	Competition	Round	Club	Home	Away	Aggregate
2001–02	UEFA Women's Cup	Group 3	(Hungary) Femina Budapest	–	4–0	4th
2001–02	UEFA Women's Cup	Group 3	(Sweden) Umeå	–	3–0	4th
2001–02	UEFA Women's Cup	Group 3	(Czech Republic) Sparta Prague	–	7–0	4th
