= Bulgarian Women's Cup =

Купа на България - жени
- Founded: 1985
- Region: Bulgaria
- Current champions: WFC Ludogorets Razgrad
- Most championships: FC NSA Sofia (19 titles)

The Bulgarian Women's Cup (Bulgarian: Купа на България - жени) is the national women's football cup competition in Bulgaria. It was first contested in 1985/86.

Record champion is FC NSA Sofia with 12 titles. The 2011 cup final was NSA's first lost home game since 2004, which shows the team's dominance in the cup and league.

== List of finals ==
Year	Winner	Result	Runner-up
1985/86	Botev Plovdiv		
1986/87	CSKA Sofia		
1987/88	Slavia Sofia		
1988/89	Akademik Sofia		
1989/90	CSKA Sofia		
1991/92	FC NSA Sofia		
1992/93	Neftochimic Burgas		
1993/94	FC NSA Sofia		
1994/95	Grand Hotel Varna		
1995/96	Lokomotiv Plovdiv		
1996/97	FC NSA Sofia		
1997/98	Grand Hotel Varna		
1998/99	Grand Hotel Varna		
1999/00	Grand Hotel Varna		
2000/01	FC NSA Sofia	round-robin	Trivia Burgas
2001/02	Grand Hotel Varna		
2002/03	LP Super Sport Sofia		
2003/04	FC NSA Sofia		
2004/05	LP Super Sport Sofia		
2005/06	LP Super Sport Sofia		
2006/07	FC NSA Sofia		
2007/08	FC NSA Sofia	4–0	Bolyarki
2008/09	FC NSA Sofia	3–1	LP Super Sport Sofia
2009/10	FC NSA Sofia	4–1	Beroe Stara Zagora
2010/11	Olympia Sofia	3–2	FC NSA Sofia
2011/12	FC NSA Sofia	3–2	Olympia Sofia
2012/13	FC NSA Sofia	6–0	Evrokomet 90 Plovdiv
2013/14	FC NSA Sofia	3–1	Sportika Blagoevgrad
2014/15	FC NSA Sofia	1–1 (4–3 pen)	LP Super Sport Sofia
2015/16	FC NSA Sofia	3–1	Sportika Blagoevgrad
2016/17	FC NSA Sofia	3–1	LP Super Sport Sofia
2017/18	FC NSA Sofia	2–0	Sportika Blagoevgrad
2018/19	FC NSA Sofia	3–2	Sportika Blagoevgrad
2019/20	Not held		
2020/21	FC NSA Sofia	4–0	Barocco Sofia
2021/22	FC NSA Sofia	2–0	Lokomotiv Stara Zagora
2022/23	Not held		
2023/24	Not held		
2024/25	Not held		
2025/26	WFC Ludogorets Razgrad	4–0	FC NSA Sofia

== Champions ==
Bold indicates clubs which play in the 2023–24 Bulgarian Women's League.

Club	Winners	Years won
FC NSA Sofia	12	1991–92, 1993–94, 1996–97, 2000–01, 2003–04, 2006–07, 2007–08, 2008–09, 2009–10, 2011–12, 2012–13, 2013–14, 2014–15, 2015–16, 2016–17, 2017–18, 2018–19, 2020–21
WFC Varna (Note: WFC Varna titles include those won as FC Grand Hotel Varna.)	6	1990–91, 1994–95, 1997–98, 1998–99, 1999–00, 2001–02
LP Super Sport Sofia	3	2002–03, 2004–05, 2005–06
CSKA Sofia	2	1986–87, 1989–90
Botev Plovdiv	1	1985–86
Slavia Sofia	1	1987–88
Akademik Sofia	1	1988–89
Neftochimic Burgas	1	1992–93
Lokomotiv Plovdiv	1	1995–96
Olympia Sofia	1	2010–11
Ludogorets Razgrad	1	2025–26

== See also ==
- Bulgarian Cup, men's edition
