= LP Super Sport Sofia =

LP Super Sport
- Full name: FC LP Super Sport Sofia
- Founded: 2001; 25 years ago
- Dissolved: 2026; 0 years ago merge with OFC Sofia 1992 (women)
- Ground: German Stadium
- Capacity: 2,000
- Chairman: (Bulgaria)
- Manager: (Bulgaria) Lachezar Palankov
- League: Bulgarian Women's League
- 2024-25: 8th
| Home colours | Away colours |

LP Super Sport (Bulgarian: ЛП Супер Спорт София) was a Bulgarian women's football club from the capital city Sofia, that played in the top tier of Bulgarian Bulgarian Women's League football, Bulgarian Women's League. In August 2026 the team was merged with OFC Sofia 1992 (women).

== History ==
LP Super Sport was founded in 2001. The team won the Bulgarian League in 2003–04 season and qualified for UEFA Women's Cup. They become the first Bulgarian team to score points in the Women's Cup.

== Honours ==
- Bulgarian Women's League
  - Winners (1): 2003–04
  - Runners-up (14): 2001–02, 2002–03, 2004–05, 2005–06, 2006–07, 2007–08, 2009–10, 2010–11, 2011–12, 2013–14, 2014–15, 2015–16, 2016–17, 2017–18, 2018–19
- Bulgarian Women's Cup
  - Winners (3): 2002–03, 2004–05, 2005–06

== Seasons ==
Results of league and cup competitions by season
| Season | League | | | | | | | | | | | Women's Cup | Other competitions | |
| Season | Division | Level | P | W | D | L | F | A | GD | Pts | Pos | Women's Cup | Other competitions | |
|---|---|---|---|---|---|---|---|---|---|---|---|---|---|---|
| 2001–02 | Women's State Championship | 1 | | | | | | | | | 2nd | | | |
| 2002–03 | Women's State Championship | 1 | | | | | | | | | 2nd | Winners | | |
| 2003–04 | Women's State Championship | 1 | | | | | | | | | 1st | Runner-up | | |
| 2004–05 | Women's State Championship | 1 | | | | | | | | | 2nd | Winners | UEFA Women's Cup | QR1 |
| 2005–06 | Women's State Championship | 1 | | | | | | | | | 2nd | Winners | | |
| 2006–07 | Women's State Championship | 1 | | | | | | | | | 2nd | | | |
| 2007–08 | Women's State Championship | 1 | 16 | 14 | 1 | 3 | 56 | 13 | –43 | 8 | 2nd | | | |
| 2008–09 | Women's State Championship | 1 | 14 | 8 | 1 | 5 | 21 | 24 | –3 | 25 | 3rd | Runner-up | | |
| 2009–10 | Bulgarian Women's Championship | 1 | 16 | 12 | 1 | 3 | 66 | 16 | +50 | 37 | 2nd | Quarterfinals | | |
| 2010–11 | Bulgarian Women's Championship | 1 | 14 | 7 | 1 | 6 | 22 | 23 | –1 | 22 | 2nd | Quarterfinals | | |
| 2011–12 | Bulgarian Women's Championship | 1 | 10 | 7 | 1 | 2 | 36 | 7 | +19 | 22 | 2nd | Quarterfinals | | |
| 2012–13 | Bulgarian Women's Championship | 1 | 16 | 9 | 3 | 4 | 34 | 17 | +17 | 30 | 2nd | Quarterfinals | | |
| 2013–14 | Bulgarian Women's Championship | 1 | 14 | 11 | 2 | 1 | 36 | 16 | +30 | 35 | 2nd | Semifinals | | |
| 2014–15 | Bulgarian Women's Championship | 1 | 16 | 14 | 0 | 2 | 65 | 12 | +53 | 42 | 2nd | Runner-ups | | |
| 2015–16 | Bulgarian Women's Championship | 1 | 18 | 15 | 0 | 3 | 93 | 16 | +77 | 45 | 2nd | Semifinals | | |
| 2016–17 | Bulgarian Women's Championship | 1 | 20 | 17 | 2 | 1 | 86 | 11 | +75 | 53 | 2nd | Runner-up | | |
| 2017–18 | Bulgarian Women's Championship | 1 | 20 | 14 | 4 | 2 | 66 | 22 | +44 | 46 | 2nd | Quarterfinals | | |
| 2018–19 | Bulgarian Women's Championship | 1 | 18 | 11 | 2 | 5 | 33 | 23 | +10 | 35 | 3rd | | | |
| 2019–20 | Bulgarian Women's Championship | 1 | 16 | 4 | 2 | 10 | 21 | 29 | –8 | 14 | 5th | | | |
| 2020–21 | Bulgarian Women's Championship | 1 | 26 | 14 | 6 | 6 | 61 | 31 | +30 | 48 | 5th | | | |
| 2021–22 | Bulgarian Women's League | 1 | 22 | 8 | 1 | 13 | 34 | 49 | –15 | 25 | 8th | | | |
| 2022–23 | Bulgarian Women's League | 1 | 24 | 10 | 6 | 8 | 59 | 43 | +16 | 36 | 7th | | | |
| 2023–24 | Bulgarian Women's League | 1 | 22 | 12 | 2 | 8 | 41 | 31 | +10 | 38 | 5th | | | |
| 2024–25 | Bulgarian Women's League | 1 | 22 | 8 | 5 | 9 | 27 | 38 | -11 | 29 | 8th | | | |
| 2025–26 | Bulgarian Women's League | 1 | 28 | 13 | 5 | 10 | 42 | 49 | -7 | 44 | 6th | DNQ | | |

Notes

Key

| Champions | Runners-up | Third place | Promoted | Relegated |

== European record ==
As of match played 29 July 2021

| Competition | Played | Won | Drew | Lost | GF | GA | GD | Win% |
|---|---|---|---|---|---|---|---|---|
| UEFA Women's Cup | 3 | 0 | 1 | 2 | 3 | 10 | −7 | 0.00 |
| Total | 3 | 0 | 1 | 2 | 3 | 10 | −7 | 0.00 |

=== Matches ===
| Season | Competition | Stage | Result | Opponent |
|---|---|---|---|---|
| 2004–05 | UEFA Women's Cup | Qualifying Group Stage | 1–5 | (Kazakhstan) Alma |
| 2004–05 | UEFA Women's Cup | Qualifying Group Stage | 0–3 | (Czech Republic) Slavia Prague |
| 2004–05 | UEFA Women's Cup | Qualifying Group Stage | 2–2 | (Slovakia) MŠK Žiar nad Hronom |
