= Bulgarian Women's League =

Top women's football (soccer) league in Bulgaria

- Founded: 1985
- Country: Bulgaria
- Confederation: UEFA
- Number of clubs: 12
- Level on pyramid: 1
- Domestic cup: Bulgarian Cup
- International cup: UEFA Champions League
- Current champions: WFC Ludogorets Razgrad (2025–26)
- Most championships: FC NSA Sofia (20 titles)
- Broadcaster: fifa+
- Current: 2026–27

The Bulgarian Women's League (Bulgarian: Българска женска лига) is the top level league of women's football in Bulgaria.

It features twelve teams that play a double round robin to decide the champion, which qualifies for a spot in the UEFA Women's Champions League. Because of the few teams in the country the league has no relegation to a second league.

== History ==
=== Pre-women football ===
In the 1920s, the young operetta and opera singer Mimi Balkanska became the first Bulgarian woman seriously involved in football in Bulgaria. She trained with Slavia Sofia, participated in matches as a goalkeeper of the singers against the artists, formed a team, even was a side referee at a charity match.

The first demonstration women's football match in Bulgaria was played in Ruse in 1967. Again, the first women's football team in the country was officially formed there in 1980, and a year later the first inter-city football match between women's teams was played in Ruse.

Thus, the beginning of women's football in Bulgaria was officially set in the early 1980s. This happened about 100 years after the first match between women in England, which is also the modern homeland of women's football.

=== First official championship: 1985-1990 ===
In the 1980s there were a few arguments in the Bulgarian football community for and against the official "recognition" of women's football as a sport. Eventually the Bulgarian Football Union decided to hold the First Republican Women's Football Tournament in the 1985/86 season. According to official reports, over 10,000 female players took part in this championship, and it is suggested that this number is highly inflated. Nineteen teams, representing the various counties (now districts) of the time, reached the final stage of the tournament, which followed a complex schedule. The semi-finals of the first championship were played between Akademik Sofia and Sredets Sofia 7:2 and Slantse Stara Zagora and Dunav Ruse 2:0. In the match for third place Sredets (today CSKA) defeated Dunav with 3:1. In the final Akademik wins the first women's title in Bulgaria after 3:1 against Slantse. The names of 16 women who won the first gold medals for the state champion are: Tsvetanka Miteva, Galina Doneva, Katya Petkova, Iliana Georgieva, Tsvetanka Todorova, Hristina Hristova, Ganka Todorova, Bistra Trifonova, Diana Kalfina, Emilia Milanova, Daniela Bineva, Stoilka Ilcheva, Iliana Bogdanova, Albena Stefanova, Isabel Adjemianova and Polina Shishmanova. Their coach is Valeri Nachkov. In the next 2 seasons 1986–87 and 1987–88 Akademik again triumphed with the title. For every bigger football club in Bulgaria at that time it was a matter of honour to have a women's team. Women's football in general was on the rise and gaining more and more fans.

=== Grand Hotel Varna ages: 1990–2003 ===
After the political changes in Bulgaria in 1989, as in many other spheres, there was a crisis in women's football. A huge number of teams were closed down for financial and organisational reasons. The championship shrunk to the participation of only 3-4 clubs. In this period, the absolute hegemon in Bulgaria was the Grand Hotel Varna established in the late 1980s. This team, which is owned by the eponymous hotel complex located in the Saints Constantine and Helena ressort, won 10 consecutive championship titles in the period from 1993 to 2003.

=== NSA Hegemony: 2003–2022 ===
After Grand Hotel Varna sponsorship money were shrunk, NSA Sofia become absolut hegemony. LP Super Sport ended the Grand Hotel reigh and become champions in 2003. Bulgarian Football Union left the organisation of the women's league to the Amateur football league. NSA become absolute hegemony winning not only 17 conservative championships, but also the national team of Bulgaria had mainly players from NSA. FC NSA Sofia hegemony was ended by Lokomotiv Stara Zagora in 2022.

=== UEFA push and league development: 2022–present ===
Following the UEFA new restrictions for women's football in January 2023, all First League teams have to have a women's department playing in at least one youth or main league from 2023–24 season. At this point, only Etar and Pirin Blagoevgrad were professional teams having women department, while Lokomotiv Stara Zagora and Sevlievo Ladies had male teams in amateur divisions and were part from the Women's league. Some of the First League teams started as youth women teams, Dunav Ruse decided to join the league from 2023. On 26 August 2023 WFC Varna was bought by Ludogorets Razgrad owners and was transformed into the woman's team of Ludogorets.

== 2026–27 Teams ==
Team	Location	Stadium	Capacity (seating)
Botev	Plovdiv	Starika Sports Complex	3,000
Enko	Plovdiv	Plovdiv Stadium	1,000
Etar	Veliko Tarnovo	Ivaylo Stadium	25,000
FDA	Sofia	NSA Stadium	1,000
Lokomotiv	Stara Zagora	Lokomotiv	2,000
Ludogorets	Razgrad	Eagles' Nest	2,000
NSA Sofia	Sofia	NSA Stadium	1,000
Pirin	Blagoevgrad	Hristo Botev	7,500
Paldin	Plovdiv	Paldin Stadium	1,000
Sevlievo Ladies	Sevlievo	Rakovski Stadium	5,000
Sportika	Blagoevgrad	Hristo Botev	7,500
UFC Sofia 1992	Sofia	German Stadium	2,000

== Champions ==
=== By season ===
Teams in just bold indicate doubles with the Bulgarian Women's Cup.

Year	Winners	Runners-up	Third place	Top goalscorer	Goals
1985–86	Akademik Sofia	Slantse Stara Zagora	Sredets Sofia		
1986–87	Akademik Sofia	Sredets Sofia	Vitosha Sofia		
1987–88	Akademik Sofia	CSKA Sofia	Slavia Sofia		
1988–89	Sredets Sofia	Akademik Sofia	Slavia Sofia		
1989–90	Akademik Sofia	Sredets Sofia	Lokomotiv Plovdiv		
1990–91	NSA Sofia	Hebar Pazardzhik	Lokomotiv Plovdiv		
1991–92	Lokomotiv Stara Zagora	NSA Sofia	CSKA Sofia		
1992–93	CSKA Sofia	Grand Hotel Varna	NSA Sofia		
1993–94	Grand Hotel Varna	Lokomotiv Plovdiv	Neftochimic Burgas		
1994–95	**Grand Hotel Varna**	NSA Sofia	Neftochimic Burgas		
1995–96	Grand Hotel Varna	Neftochimic Burgas	Port Varna		
1996–97	Grand Hotel Varna	Lokomotiv Plovdiv	Neftochimic Burgas		
1997–98	**Grand Hotel Varna**	Port Varna	Neftochimic Burgas		
1998–99	**Grand Hotel Varna**	Trivia Burgas	NSA Sofia		
1999–00	**Grand Hotel Varna**	NSA Sofia	Port Varna		
2000–01	Grand Hotel Varna	NSA Sofia	Interport Albena		
2001–02	**Grand Hotel Varna**	LP Super Sport	NSA Sofia		
2002–03	Grand Hotel Varna	LP Super Sport	NSA Sofia		
2003–04	LP Super Sport	Grand Hotel Varna	NSA Sofia		
2004–05	NSA Sofia	LP Super Sport	Grand Hotel Varna		
2005–06	NSA Sofia	LP Super Sport	Grand Hotel Varna		
2006–07	**NSA Sofia**	LP Super Sport	Grand Hotel Varna		
2007–08	**NSA Sofia**	LP Super Sport	Bolyarki		
2008–09	**NSA Sofia**	Olympia Sofia	LP Super Sport		
2009–10	**NSA Sofia**	LP Super Sport	Evrokomet 90 Plovdiv		
2010–11	NSA Sofia	LP Super Sport	Olympia Sofia		
2011–12	**NSA Sofia**	LP Super Sport	Evrokomet 90 Plovdiv		
2012–13	**NSA Sofia**	Sportika Blagoevgrad	LP Super Sport		
2013–14	**NSA Sofia**	LP Super Sport	Sportika Blagoevgrad		
2014–15	**NSA Sofia**	LP Super Sport	Sportika Blagoevgrad		
2015–16	**NSA Sofia**	LP Super Sport	Sportika Blagoevgrad		
2016–17	**NSA Sofia**	LP Super Sport	Evrokomet 90 Plovdiv		
2017–18	**NSA Sofia**	LP Super Sport	Etar		
2018–19	**NSA Sofia**	Sportika Blagoevgrad	LP Super Sport		
2019–20	**NSA Sofia**	Paldin Plovdiv	Etar		
2020–21	**NSA Sofia**	Lokomotiv Plovdiv	Lokomotiv Stara Zagora		
2021–22	Lokomotiv Stara Zagora	NSA Sofia	Barocco Sofia		
2022–23	Lokomotiv Stara Zagora	NSA Sofia	Sportika Blagoevgrad		
2023–24	NSA Sofia	Lokomotiva Stara Zagora	Sportika Blagoevgrad	(Ukraine) Anastasiia Skorynina	35
2024–25	NSA Sofia	Sportika Blagoevgrad	Lokomotiva Stara Zagora	(Bulgaria) Polina Rasina	40
2025–26	**Ludogorets Razgrad**	NSA Sofia	Lokomotiva Stara Zagora	(Bulgaria) Monika Baliova	32

=== By team ===
Bold indicates clubs which play in the 2026–27 Bulgarian Women's League.

Club	Winners	Runners-up	Years won	Years runners-up
**FC NSA Sofia**	20	7	1990–91, 2004–05, 2005–06, 2006–07, 2007–08, 2008–09, 2009–10, 2010–11, 2011–12, 2012–13, 2013–14, 2014–15, 2015–16, 2016–17, 2017–18, 2018–19, 2019–20, 2020–21, 2023–24, 2024–25	1991–92, 1994–95, 1999–00, 2000–01, 2021–22, 2022–23, 2025–26
WFC Varna (Note: WFC Varna titles include those won as FC Grand Hotel Varna.)	10	2	1993–94, 1994–95, 1995–96, 1996–97, 1997–98, 1998–99, 1999–00, 2000–01, 2001–02, 2002–03	1992–93, 2003–04
Akademik Sofia	4	1	1985–86, 1986–87, 1987–88, 1989–90	1988–89
**Lokomotiv Stara Zagora**	3	1	1991–92, 2021–22, 2022–23	2023–24
CSKA Sofia (Note: CSKA titles include those won as Sredets.)	2	3	1988–89, 1992–93	1986–87, 1987–88, 1989–90
LP Super Sport Sofia	1	14	2003–04	2001–02, 2002–03, 2004–05, 2005–06, 2006–07, 2007–08, 2009–10, 2010–11, 2011–12, 2013–14, 2014–15, 2015–16, 2016–17, 2017–18, 2018–19
**Ludogorets Razgrad**	1	0	2025–26	
Lokomotiv Plovdiv	0	3		1993–94, 1996–97, 2020–21
**Sportika Blagoevgrad**	0	3		2012–13, 2018–19, 2024–25
Beroe Stara Zagora (Note: Beroe was named Slantse in 1985–86 season.)	0	1		1985–86
Hebar Pazardzhik	0	1		1990–91
Neftochimic Burgas	0	1		1995–96
Port Varna	0	1		1997–98
Trivia Burgas	0	1		1998–99
Olympia Sofia	0	1		2008–09
**Paldin Plovdiv**	0	1		2019–20

=== By city ===
Club	Winners	Runners-up
Sofia	25	25
Varna	10	3
Stara Zagora	4	1
Razgrad	1	0
Plovdiv	0	4
Blagoevgrad	0	2
Burgas	0	2
Pazardzhik	0	1
