= Olympia Sofia =

Women's football club In Bulgaria

- Full name: FC Olympia Sofia
- Founded: 2007; 18 years ago
- Dissolved: 2015; 10 years ago
- Ground: Obelya Stadium
- 2014-15: Bulgarian AFG, 7th
Home colours	Away colours

Olympia Sofia (Олимпия София) was a Bulgarian women's football club from the capital city Sofia, playing in the Bulgarian AFG, the top division of Bulgarian women's football. In 2010–11 season the team wоn the Bulgarian Women's Cup for the first time in its history. In the final match, played on 15 June 2011, Olympia defeated the Bulgarian league champions NSA Sofia 2–3 at the Vasil Levski National Stadium. it was dissolved in 2015.

== Honours ==
Bulgarian Women's League

- : Runners-up (1): 2008–09

Bulgarian Women's Cup

- : Winners (1): 2010–11
- : Runners-up (1): 2011–12
