= Bulgaria women's national football team =

Women's national association football team representing Bulgaria

Bulgaria
- Nickname: Лъвиците (The Lionesses)
- Association: Bulgarian Football Union
- Confederation: UEFA (Europe)
- Head coach: Kaloyan Petkov
- Captain: Nikoleta Boycheva
- Top scorer: Liliana Kostova (8)
- Home stadium: Various
- FIFA code: BUL
First colours	Second colours

FIFA ranking
- Current: 109 ▼2 (16 June 2026)
- Highest: 42 (December 2008)
- Lowest: 99 (June 2024)

First international
- Bulgaria 1–1 Spain (Sofia, Bulgaria; 11 October 1987)

Biggest win
- Estonia 0–5 Bulgaria (Otopeni, Romania; 18 November 2006); Bulgaria 5–0 Luxembourg (Ta' Qali, Malta; 5 June 2009); Bulgaria 5–0 Georgia (Lovech, Bulgaria; 21 November 2009); Gibraltar 0–5 Bulgaria (Europa Point, Gibraltar; 7 March 2026)

Biggest defeat
- France 14–0 Bulgaria (Le Mans, France; 28 November 2013)

The Bulgaria women's national football team (Bulgarian: Български женски национален отбор по футбол, romanized: Bǎlgarski zhenski natsionalen otbor po futbol) represents Bulgaria in international women's football, and is controlled by the Bulgarian Football Union, a member association of UEFA.

The team's major success came in 2008 when they won the Balkan Championship and the Albena Cup in the same year. These major tournament victories brought them up to their all-time highest FIFA world ranking of 33rd.

== Team image ==
=== Nicknames ===
The Bulgaria women's national football team have been nicknamed as "Лъвиците (The Lionesses)".

=== Home stadium ===
Bulgaria plays their home matches on the Lovech Stadium.

== Results and fixtures ==
The following is a list of match results in the last 12 months, as well as any future matches that have been scheduled.

Legend

Win Draw Lose Fixture

=== 2026 ===
3 March 2026 2027 FIFA Women's World Cup qualification	Bulgaria	0–1	Croatia	Sofia, Bulgaria
11:00		Report (FIFA); Report (UEFA)	Vunić 80'	Stadium: Stadion Aleksandar Shalamanov; Attendance: 310; Referee: Araksya Saribekyan (Armenia)

7 March 2026 2027 FIFA Women's World Cup qualification	Gibraltar	0–5	Bulgaria	Europa Point, Gibraltar
19:00		Report (FIFA); Report (UEFA)	Borrell 2' (o.g.); Rasina 39'; D. Ivanova 84', 85'; I. Naydenova 90+4'	Stadium: Europa Point Stadium; Attendance: 361; Referee: Laura Mauricio (Switzerland)

14 April 2026 2027 FIFA Women's World Cup qualification	Bulgaria	1–3	Kosovo	Sofia, Bulgaria
16:00	Yaneva 9'	Report (FIFA); Report (UEFA)	Memeti 15'; Smaili 21'; Fejza 89'	Stadium: Stadion Aleksandar Shalamanov; Attendance: 250; Referee: Zoe Stavrou (Cyprus)

18 April 2026 2027 FIFA Women's World Cup qualification	Kosovo	2–1	Bulgaria	Pristina
18:00	Smaili 52'; Memti 90+6'	Report (FIFA); Report (UEFA)	Petrova 42'	Stadium: Fadil Vokrri Stadium; Attendance: 260; Referee: Jana Van Laere (Belgium)

5 June 2026 2027 FIFA Women's World Cup qualification	Bulgaria	3–1	Gibraltar	Sofia
	Yaneva 2'; Ferro 43' (o.g.); Petrova 70'	Report (FIFA); Report (UEFA)	Gilbert 89'	Stadium: Stadion Aleksandar Shalamanov; Referee: Irena Velevačkoska (North Macedonia)

9 June 2026 2027 FIFA Women's World Cup qualification	Croatia	4–0	Bulgaria	Pula
	Ćavar 26', 51'; Čanjevac 49'; Kurkutović 67'	Report (FIFA); Report (UEFA)		Stadium: Stadion Aldo Drosina; Referee: Melissa Burgin (England)

== Coaching staff ==
=== Current coaching staff ===
As of 28 November 2022

Role	Name
Head coach	(Bulgaria) Kaloyan Petkov
Assistant coaches	(Bulgaria) Velizar Hristov
Assistant coaches	(Bulgaria) Trifon Panev
Goalkeeping coach	(Bulgaria) Emil Varadinov
Team manager	(Bulgaria) Doychin Bahov

=== Manager history ===
Name	Period	Matches	Wins	Draws	Losses	Winning %	Notes	Ref.
(Bulgaria) Emil Atanasov	18 November 2006 – 25 August 2010	21	11	4	6	52.38%		
(Bulgaria) Valentin Chakarov	24 November 2010 – 19 September 2012	13	0	1	12	0%		
(Bulgaria) Emil Kartselski	20 August 2013 – 21 August 2014	11	2	1	8	18.18%		
(Bulgaria) Silvia Radoyska	17 September 2014–present	29	5	2	22	22.73%		

== Players ==
=== Current squad ===
The following players were called up for the 2027 FIFA Women's World Cup qualifying matches against Croatia and Gibraltar on 3 and 7 March, respectively.

Caps and goals correct as of 7 March 2026, after the match against Gibraltar.

No.	Pos.	Player	Date of birth (age)	Caps	Goals	Club
1	GK	Martina Ilieva	8 February 2007 (age 19)	0	0	(Bulgarian Football Union) PFC Ludogorets
12	GK	Gabriela Genova	13 June 2008 (age 18)	0	0	(Bulgarian Football Union) PFC Ludogorets
23	GK	Milena Karakoleva	3 April 2004 (age 22)	6	0	(Bulgarian Football Union) FC Sportika
2	DF	Nikoleta Boycheva (Captain)	20 August 1994 (age 32)	24	1	(Romanian Football Federation) Farul Constanța
3	DF	Yanitsa Ivanova	5 January 2001 (age 25)	29	0	(Bulgarian Football Union) FC NSA
4	DF	Teodora Todorova	19 September 2006 (age 20)	0	0	(Bulgarian Football Union) PFC Ludogorets
5	DF	Nora Dimitrova	26 July 1996 (age 30)	23	1	(Bulgarian Football Union) PFC Ludogorets
6	DF	Bianka Demirova	8 July 2006 (age 20)	4	0	(Bulgarian Football Union) PFC Ludogorets
15	MF	Yoanna Popova	7 April 2010 (age 16)	0	0	(Bulgarian Football Union) FC NSA
16	MF	Bozhidara Ivanova	10 November 2004 (age 21)	0	0	(Bulgarian Football Union) FC NSA
19	DF	Yana Dineva	8 November 2002 (age 23)	12	0	(Bulgarian Football Union) Lokomotiv Stara Zagora
9	MF	Lora Petrova	12 October 1998 (age 28)	30	3	(Italian Football Federation) Donna Roma
10	MF	Zdravka Parapunova	6 August 2003 (age 23)	5	0	(Swiss Football Association) FC Rapperswil-Jona
11	MF	Kristiana Karaivanova	11 July 2004 (age 22)	21	1	(Italian Football Federation) Frosinone Calcio
14	MF	Dimitra Ivanova	26 January 2004 (age 22)	20	4	(Romanian Football Federation) Farul Constanța
17	MF	Simona Stefanova	3 September 1993 (age 33)	2	0	(Swiss Football Association) FC Thun
18	MF	Rona Mihaylova	15 October 2006 (age 20)	0	0	(Bulgarian Football Union) FC NSA
20	MF	İsmigül Yalçıner	20 October 1994 (age 32)	2	0	(Turkish Football Federation) Çekmeköy
22	MF	Ivana Naydenova	21 December 2001 (age 24)	25	4	(Italian Football Federation) Frosinone Calcio
7	FW	Evdokiya Popadiynova	26 October 1996 (age 30)	14	4	(Hellenic Football Federation) AEK
8	FW	Polina Rasina	12 March 1999 (age 27)	21	4	(Bulgarian Football Union) FC NSA
13	FW	Aleksandra Yaneva	24 February 2001 (age 25)	14	3	(Israel Football Association) Maccabi Hadera
21	FW	Yuliana Aleksandrova	21 February 1999 (age 27)	13	0	(Bulgarian Football Union) FC NSA
24	FW	Polina Demirova	8 July 2006 (age 20)	2	0	(Bulgarian Football Union) PFC Ludogorets

=== Recent call-ups ===
The following players have also been called up to the squad within the past 12 months.

Pos.	Player	Date of birth (age)	Caps	Goals	Club	Latest call-up

== Records ==
As of 23 May 2021

Active players in bold, statistics correct as of 2021.

=== Most capped players ===
#	Player	Year(s)	Caps

=== Top goalscorers ===
#	Player	Year(s)	Goals	Caps

== Competitive record ==
=== FIFA Women's World Cup ===
FIFA Women's World Cup record								Qualification record					
Year	Result	Pld	W	D*	L	GF	GA	Pld	W	D*	L	GF	GA
(China) 1991	Did not qualify							UEFA Euro 1991					
(Sweden) 1995	Did not qualify							UEFA Euro 1995					
(United States) 1999	Did not qualify							6	2	1	3	11	12
(United States) 2003	Did not enter							Did not enter					
(China) 2007	Did not enter							Did not enter					
(Germany) 2011	Did not qualify							8	2	2	4	9	25
(Canada) 2015	Did not qualify							10	0	1	9	3	62
(France) 2019	Did not enter							Did not enter					
(Australia) (New Zealand) 2023	Did not qualify							10	0	0	10	1	37
(Brazil) 2027	Did not qualify							6	2	0	4	10	11
(Costa Rica) (Jamaica) (Mexico) (United States) 2031	To be determined							To be determined					
(United Kingdom) 2035	To be determined							To be determined					
Total	-	-	-	-	-	-	-	40	6	4	30	34	147

*Draws include knockout matches decided on penalty kicks.

=== UEFA Women's Championship ===
UEFA Women's Championship record								Qualifying record							
Year	Result	Pld	W	D*	L	GF	GA	Pld	W	D*	L	GF	GA	P/R	Rnk
(England) (Italy) (Norway) (Sweden) 1984	Did not enter							Did not enter							
(Norway) 1987	Did not enter							Did not enter							
(West Germany) 1989	Did not qualify							8	0	2	6	1	18	–	
(Denmark) 1991	Did not qualify							6	0	0	6	3	18	–	
(Italy) 1993	Did not qualify							4	0	0	4	1	9	–	
(England) (Germany) (Norway) (Sweden) 1995	Did not qualify							4	1	1	2	3	11	–	
(Norway) (Sweden) 1997	Did not qualify							6	4	0	2	13	6	–	
(Germany) 2001	Did not enter							Did not enter							
(England) 2005	Did not enter							Did not enter							
(Finland) 2009	Did not qualify							3	2	0	1	8	1	–	
(Sweden) 2013	Did not qualify							10	0	0	10	1	54	–	
(Netherlands) 2017	Did not enter							Did not enter							
(England) 2022	Did not enter							Did not enter							
(Switzerland) 2025	Did not qualify							6	2	1	3	6	8	(Note: From Euro 2025 onwards a new qualifying format was introduced, linked to the Women's Nations League where teams are divided into leagues with promotion/relegation between the leagues at the end of each cycle.)	41st
2029	To be determined							To be determined							
Total	–	–	–	–	–	–	–	41	7	3	31	30	117	41st	

*Draws include knockout matches decided on penalty kicks.

=== UEFA Women's Nations League ===
UEFA Women's Nations League record
Year	League	Group	Pos	Pld	W	D	L	GF	GA	P/R	Rnk
2023–24	C	5	2nd	6	1	2	3	4	14	*	40th
2025	C	5	To be determined								
Total				6	1	2	3	4	14	40th	

▲	Promoted at end of season
Same position	No movement at end of season
▼	Relegated at end of season
*	Participated in promotion/relegation play-offs

== Honours ==
=== Regional ===
- **Balkan Cup**
  - **Champions (1)** 2008

=== Friendly ===
- **Albena Cup**
  - **Champions (1)** 2008

== See also ==
- Sport in Bulgaria
  - Football in Bulgaria
    - Women's football in Bulgaria
- Bulgaria men's national football team
