= FC Sportika Blagoevgrad =

Sportika Blagoevgrad
- Full name: Women Football Club Sportika Blagoevgrad
- Founded: 2006; 20 years ago
- Ground: Pokrovnik
- Manager: Iskren Maznev
- League: Bulgarian Women's League
- 2024–25: 2nd
- Website: https://fc-sportika.com/
Home colours	Away colours

Women Football Club Sportika Blagoevgrad (Bulgarian: Женски Футболен Клуб Спортика Благоевград) is a Bulgarian women's football club from the city of Blagoevgrad, currently playing in the top tier of Bulgarian Bulgarian Women's League football, Bulgarian Women's League.

== History ==
It was founded in 2006 and joined the Women's State Championship. The team finished in 2nd place in the 2012–13 season – their best position so far.

== Honours ==
Bulgarian Women's League

- : Runners-up (2): 2012–13, 2018–19, 2024–25

Bulgarian Women's Cup

- : Runners-up (4): 2013–14, 2015–16, 2017–18, 2018–19

== Players ==
=== First-team squad ===
As of 26 August 2023

Note: Flags indicate national team as defined under FIFA eligibility rules; some limited exceptions apply. Players may hold more than one non-FIFA nationality.

No.	Pos.	Nation	Player
2	MF	BUL	Elena Kamenova
4	DF	BUL	Ivana Chalakova
5	MF	BUL	Maria Ayanova
7	DF	BUL	Monika Baliova
8	MF	BUL	Maria Kartselska
9	FW	BUL	Petya Manova
10	MF	BUL	Gergana Halyanova
11	FW	BUL	Vasilena Stefanova

No.	Pos.	Nation	Player
13	DF	BUL	Preslava Ivanova
15	GK	BUL	Nia Yordanska (captain)
16	FW	BUL	Ana Tserovska
17	MF	BUL	Ivana Hristova
18	DF	BUL	Iveta Andreycheva
19	MF	BUL	Ivana Todorova
22	MF	BUL	Veni Dona Sarbinska

== Notable former players ==
Players who played for FC Sportika Blagoevgrad and received recognition at full international level

- (Bulgaria) Evdokiya Popadinova

== Seasons ==
Results of league and cup competitions by season
Season	League											Women's Cup	Other competitions	Top goalscorer	
Season	Division	Level	P	W	D	L	F	A	GD	Pts	Pos	Women's Cup	Other competitions	Top goalscorer	
2007–08	Women's State Championship	1	16	4	1	13	29	63	–34	8	13th				
2008–09	Women's State Championship	1	14	2	2	10	16	53	–37	8	6th	Quarterfinals			
2009–10	Bulgarian Women's Championship	1	16	4	3	9	36	44	–9	15	7th	Quarterfinals			
2010–11	Bulgarian Women's Championship	1	14	4	5	5	19	30	–11	17	5th	Quarterfinals			
2011–12	Bulgarian Women's Championship	1	8	4	1	3	24	14	+10	13	3rd	Quarterfinals			
2012–13	Bulgarian Women's Championship	1	16	10	0	6	33	16	+17	30	3rd	Quarterfinals			
2013–14	Bulgarian Women's Championship	1	14	8	1	5	33	18	+15	36	3rd	Runner-up			
2014–15	Bulgarian Women's Championship	1	16	12	0	4	51	12	+39	36	3rd	Quarterfinals			
2015–16	Bulgarian Women's Championship	1	18	14	1	3	71	22	+49	43	3rd	Runner-up			
2016–17	Bulgarian Women's Championship	1	20	12	2	6	55	19	+36	38	4th	Semifinals			
2017–18	Bulgarian Women's Championship	1	20	9	7	4	60	24	+36	34	5th	Runner-up			
2018–19	Bulgarian Women's Championship	1	18	13	2	3	51	27	+24	41	2nd	Runner-up			
2019–20	Bulgarian Women's Championship	1	9 (Note: Withdrew at halfway stage)	6	1	2	18	15	+3	19	9th				
2020–21	Bulgarian Women's Championship	1	Did not participate												
2021–22	Bulgarian Women's League	1	19	9	1	12	38	52	–68	28	7th				
2022–23	Bulgarian Women's League	1	24	19	1	4	84	16	–68	58	3rd				
2023–24	Bulgarian Women's League	1	22	14	3	5	89	22	+67	45	3rd			(Bulgaria) Monika Baliova	23
2024–25	Bulgarian Women's League	1	22	17	1	4	84	23	+61	52	2nd			(Bulgaria) Monika Baliova	33
2025–26	Bulgarian Women's League	1													

Notes

Key

- GS = Group stage
- QF = Quarter-finals
- SF = Semi-finals

Champions	Runners-up	Third place	Promoted	Relegated
