= WFC Beroe Stara Zagora =

Beroe
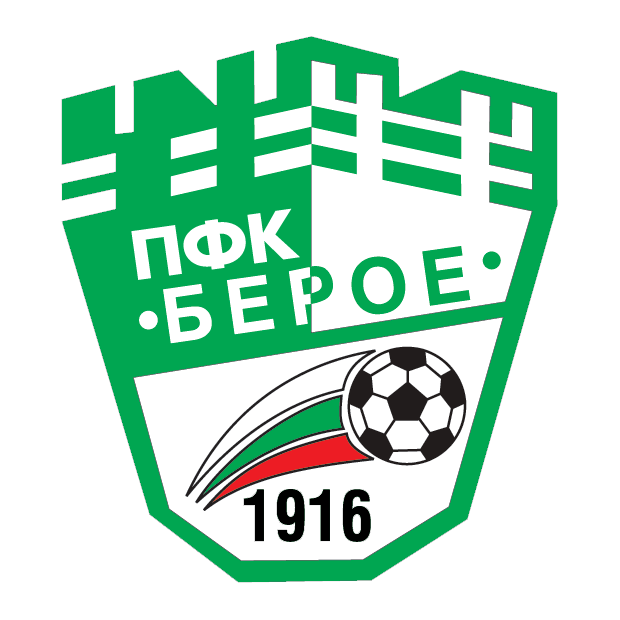
- Full name: Zhenski Futbolen Klub Beroe Stara Zagora
- Founded: 1985; 40 years ago
- Dissolved: 2018; 7 years ago
- Ground: Stadion Beroe
- Capacity: 12,000
- 2017–18: Bulgarian Championship, 4th
- Website: http://beroe.eu/women/
Home colours	Away colours

WFC Beroe Stara Zagora was a Bulgarian women's football club from Stara Zagora representing PFC Beroe Stara Zagora in the women's Bulgarian Championship.It was founded in 1985 under the name Slantse, meaning sun. The team finished second in the first-ever season for the Bulgarian women's football championship and fourth in 2010 and 2011 and reached the 2010 national cup's final.

== Honours ==
Bulgarian Women's League

- : Runners-up (1): 1985–86

Bulgarian Women's Cup

- : Runners-up (1): 2009–10
