= FC NSA Sofia =

NSA Sofia
- Full name: FC NSA Sofia
- Founded: 1942; 83 years ago
- Manager: Valentina Gospodinova
- League: Bulgarian Women's League
- 2024–25: Champions
Home colours	Away colours

FC NSA Sofia (Bulgarian: ФК НCА София) is the women's football club of the Vasil Levski National Sports Academy of Bulgaria, based in the capital city Sofia. The club has won the Bulgarian AFG title every year from 2005 to 2018, so they have played several seasons in UEFA competitions. They have failed however to get past the qualifying stage every season.

== Titles ==
- 20 Bulgarian Leagues: 1990–91, 2004–05, 2005–06, 2006–07, 2007–08, 2008–09, 2009–10, 2010–11, 2011–12, 2012–13, 2013–14, 2014–15, 2015–16, 2016–17, 2017–18, 2018–19, 2019–20, 2020–21, 2023–24, 2024–25
- 18 Bulgarian Cups: 1992, 1994, 1997, 2001, 2004, 2007, 2008, 2009, 2010, 2012, 2013, 2014, 2015, 2016, 2017, 2018, 2019, 2021

== Players ==
=== First-team squad ===
As of 26 August 2023

Note: Flags indicate national team as defined under FIFA eligibility rules; some limited exceptions apply. Players may hold more than one non-FIFA nationality.

No.	Pos.	Nation	Player
1	GK	BUL	Viktoria Dimova
2	DF	BUL	Silviya Kefarova
3	DF	BUL	Bianka Demirova
4	DF	BUL	Vanessa Ivanova
5	MF	BUL	Ralitsa Danguleva
6	MF	BUL	Teodora Metodieva
7	FW	BUL	Preslava Yordanova
8	FW	BUL	Polina Rasina
9	FW	AUS	Jessica Coates (captain)
10	MF	BUL	Polina Demirova
11	MF	BUL	Rona Mihaylova

No.	Pos.	Nation	Player
12	GK	BUL	Korneliya Naydenova
13	DF	BUL	Bozhidara Ivanova
14	DF	BUL	Anita Churusinova
15	MF	BUL	Simona Stoyanova
16	MF	BUL	Niya Duleva
17	MF	BUL	Tanya Ilieva
18	MF	BUL	Ema Nikolova
19	DF	BUL	Krasimira Spasova
20	FW	BUL	Valentina Gospodinova (player-coach)
22	MF	BUL	Ivana Naydenova

== Former internationals ==
- Bulgaria: Andriana Boyanova, Zlatka Gaberova, Borislava Kireva, Lidiya Nacheva, Korneliya Naydenova, Antoaneta Pancheva, Teya Penkova, Petya Petkova, Diana Petrakieva, Evdokiya Popadiynova, Kremena Prodanova, Veni Sarbinska, Roksana Shahanska, Evelina Traykova, Nikoleta Voyskova Yana Yordanova

== European History ==
=== UEFA Women's Cup ===
- 2005–06: First qualifying round
- 2006–07: First qualifying round
- 2007–08: First qualifying round
- 2008–09: First qualifying round

=== UEFA Women's Champions League ===
- 2009–10: Qualifying round
- 2010–11: Qualifying round
- 2011–12: Qualifying round
- 2012–13: Qualifying round
- 2013–14: Qualifying round
- 2014–15: Qualifying round
- 2015–16: Qualifying round
