= List of Cyprus women's international footballers =

This is a non-exhaustive list of Cyprus women's international footballers – association football players who have appeared at least once for the senior Cyprus women's national football team.

== Players ==
Key
**Bold**	Named to the national team in the past year

Name	Caps	Goals	National team years	Club(s)	Ref.
**Korina Adamou**	3	0	2019–	(Cyprus) Geroskipou	
**Irene Andreou**	2	0		(Cyprus) Lakatamia	
Foteini Andronikou	2	0	2019	(Cyprus) Geroskipou	
Skevi Antoniou	1+	0+	2013	(Cyprus) Chrysomilia	
**Stavriana Antoniou**	8	0		(Cyprus) Chrysomilia	
**Elena Aristodimou**	10	0		(Finland) Jyväskylän Pallokerho	
**Mikaella Chaliou**	7	0		(Cyprus) Lakatamia	
**Chara Charalambous**	9	0		(Cyprus) Lefkothea	
Mandalena Christou				Retired	
**Loucretia Chrysostomou**	11	0		(Cyprus) Lefkothea	
**Krystyna Freda**	11	0		(Cyprus) Apollon	
**Marilena Georgiou**	7	0		(Cyprus) Apollon	
Xenia Georgiou				(Cyprus) Lefkothea	
**Eleni Giannou**	10	0		(Cyprus) Apollon	
Dimitra Hadjivasili				Retired	
Natasa Hadjivasili				Retired	
**Maria Ioannou**	13	0		(Cyprus) Pyrgos Limassol	
**Antria Kirkini**	2	1		(Cyprus) Lakatamia	
**Constantina Kouzali**	1	0		(Cyprus) Omonia	
**Maria Matthaiou**	9	0		(Cyprus) Apollon	
**Antria Michail**	8	0		(Cyprus) Lefkothea	
**Eirini Michail**	4	0		(Greece) Asteras Tripolis	
Dora Modestou				Retired	
Sophia Nearchou				Retired	
**Chara Neofytou**	3	0		(Greece) Avantes Chalkida	
Kostantina Pafiti	3	0	2019–2020		
**Katerina Panagiotou**	4	0		(Cyprus) Lefkothea	
**Maria Panagiotou**	6	0		(Cyprus) Apollon	
**Marinella Panayiotou**	2	0		(Cyprus) Omonia	
**Sara Papadopoulou**	12	0		(Cyprus) Omonia	
Christina Pitsillou				(Cyprus) Nea Salamis Famagusta	
Georgia Pittaka				Retired	
Panagiota Riga				(Cyprus) Omonia	
**Filippa Savva**	14	1		(Cyprus) Nea Salamis Famagusta	
**Efthalia Siakalli**	6	0		(Cyprus) Nea Salamis Famagusta	
Margarita Sofocleous				Retired	
**Christiana Solomou**	9	0		(Cyprus) Nea Salamis Famagusta	
**Ivana Taneva**	6	0		(Cyprus) Omonia	
**Maria Toumazou**	1	0		(Cyprus) Lefkothea	
**Eleni Ttakka**	5	0		(Cyprus) Nea Salamis Famagusta	
**Kyriaki Vasiliou**	3	0		(Cyprus) Lefkothea	
**Antri Violari**	11	1		(Cyprus) Nea Salamis Famagusta	
**Georgia Xenofontos**	4	0		(Cyprus) Geroskipou	
**Victoria Zampa**	4	0		(Cyprus) Nea Salamis Famagusta	

== See also ==
- Cyprus women's national football team
