= 2025–26 Cypriot First Division (women) =

29th season of top women's football (soccer) league in Cyprus

Cypriot First Division
- Season: 2025–26
- Dates: 5 October 2025 – 5 April 2026
- Champions: Apollon Ladies
- UWCL: Apollon Ladies; Omonia
- Matches: 40
- Goals: 172 (4.3 per match)
- Top goalscorer: (Poland) Kinga Ejzel (21 goals)
- Biggest home win: Lakatamia 10–0 Olympiakos Nicosia
- Biggest away win: Olympiakos Nicosia 0–8 Aris Limassol
- Highest scoring: Lakatamia 10–0 Olympiacos Nicosia
- Longest winning run: 5 games Apollon Ladies
- Longest unbeaten run: 15 games Apollon Ladies
- Longest winless run: 16 games Olympiakos Nicosia
- Longest losing run: 16 games Olympiakos Nicosia
- All statistics correct as of 3 October 2026.

The 2025–26 Cypriot First Division season was the 29th season of the women's football top-level league in Cyprus. Apollon Ladies won their 7th consecutive league title and their 16th overall.

== Teams ==
=== Changes ===
Withdrew	Joined
Karmiotissa; Lefkothea Latsion	Olympiakos Nicosia

=== Stadiums and locations ===
Locations of the 2025–26 Cypriot First Division teams.

Team	City	Stadium	Capacity
Apollon Ladies	Limassol	Parekklisia Community Stadium	3,000
Aris Limassol	Limassol	Germasogeia Municipal Stadium	
Lakatamia	Lakatamia	Anthoupolis Gymnasium Open Court	
Olympiakos Nicosia	Nicosia	Olympias Lympion Stadium	1,000
Omonia	Nicosia	Theodorio Community Stadium	1,000

=== Personnel and sponsorship ===
Team	Head coach	Captain	Kit manufacturer	Main shirt sponsor
Apollon Ladies	(Cyprus) Angelos Tsolakis	(Cyprus) Steffi Hardy	(Germany) Puma	RETAL
Aris Limassol	(Cyprus) Victoria Zampa	(Cyprus) Chryso Michael	(Germany) Adidas	iN2BET
Lakatamia	(Serbia) Goran Petkovski	(Cyprus) Panagiota Theofilou	(Italy) Givova	Stin palia mas geitonia
Olympiakos Nicosia	(Cyprus) Alexandra Tomazou	(Cyprus) Thenia Pavlou	—	V.Tsiappos Cranes
Omonia	(Zimbabwe) Edward Mashinya	(Cyprus) Sara Papadopoulou	(Italy) Macron	Novibet

=== Managerial changes ===
Team	Outgoing manager	Manner of departure	Date of vacancy	Position in table	Incoming manager	Date of appointment
Omonia	(Cyprus) Ioakim Ioakim	End of contract	9 May 2025	Preseason	(Zimbabwe) Edward Mashinya	7 July 2025
Lakatamia	(Cyprus) Kyprianos Mouzouras	Resigned	4 August 2025	Preseason	(Serbia) Goran Petkovski	4 August 2025
Aris	(Latvia) Romāns Kvačovs	Mutual consent	23 September 2025	Preseason	(Cyprus) Victoria Zampa	7 October 2025
Apollon	(Belgium) Laurent Fassotte	Signed by St. Pölten	22 October 2025	1st	(Cyprus) Christos Hadjikonstantis	29 October 2025
Apollon	(Cyprus) Christos Hadjikonstantis	Mutual consent	3 January 2026	1st	(Cyprus) Angelos Tsolakis (interim)	3 January 2026

== League table ==
Pos	Team	Pld	W	D	L	GF	GA	GD	Pts	Qualification or relegation
1	Apollon Ladies (C)	16	12	3	1	54	10	+44	39	Qualification for the Champions League second qualifying round
2	Aris Limassol (Note: During the UEFA 2026/27 licencing audit, the CFA found that Aris Limassol did not meet certain athletic criteria and therefore could not secure the licence to participate in UEFA women’s competitions for the 2026–27 season. Omonia replaced Aris in UEFA competitions.)	16	11	3	2	53	14	+39	36	
3	Omonia	16	8	4	4	38	15	+23	28	Qualification for the Champions League second qualifying round
4	Lakatamia	16	4	0	12	23	49	−26	12	
5	Olympiakos Nicosia	16	0	0	16	4	84	−80	0	

Updated to match(es) played on completed. Source: CFA
Rules for classification: 1) Points; 2) Head-to-head points; 3) Goal difference; 4) Number of goals scored; 5) Head-to-head goal difference; 6) Head-to-head away goals scored
(C) Champions

== Results ==
=== First phase ===
Home \ Away	APL	ARI	LAK	OLY	OMO
Apollon Ladies	—	1–0	3–1	4–0	0–0
Aris Limassol	2–2	—	5–0	6–0	1–0
Lakatamia	0–5	2–5	—	2–1	0–3
Olympiakos Nicosia	0–4	0–8	1–2	—	0–4
Omonia	1–6	1–1	3–0	2–0	—

Source: CFA
Legend: Blue = home team win; Yellow = draw; Red = away team win.

=== Second phase ===
Home \ Away	APL	ARI	LAK	OLY	OMO
Apollon Ladies	—	1–4	4–0	4–0	3–2
Aris Limassol	0–5	—	5–0	7–0	1–1
Lakatamia	0–5	1–2	—	10–0	0–2
Olympiakos Nicosia	0–7	0–5	1–4	—	0–7
Omonia	0–0	0–1	4–1	8–1	—

Source: CFA
Legend: Blue = home team win; Yellow = draw; Red = away team win.

== Season statistics ==
As of 5 April 2026

=== Goalscorers ===
Rank	Player	Club	Goals
1	(Poland) Kinga Ejzel	Aris	21
2	(Cyprus) Krystyna Freda	Apollon	17
2	(England) Tash Hudson	Apollon	17
3	(Greece) Antigoni Papadopoulou	Omonia	8
4	(Cyprus) Anna Matsoukari	Omonia	7
5	(Cyprus) Elina Panagiotou	Lakatamia	6
6	(United States) Lainey Higgins	Apollon	5
6	(Brazil) Micheli Ferreira	Aris	5
6	(Cyprus) Sophia McBeth	Aris	5
6	(Lebanon) Syntia Salha	Lakatamia	5
6	(Canada) Jessica Emmerton	Omonia	5

== Awards ==
=== Best Player ===
Winner	Club	Votes	Source
(Romania) Olga Iordăchiuși	Omonia	84%	

=== Top Scorer ===
Winner	Club	Goals	Source
(Poland) Kinga Ejzel	Aris Limassol	21	

=== Best Coach ===
Winner	Club	Source
(Cyprus) Angelos Tsolakis	Apollon Ladies	

=== Team of the Season ===
PASP Best XI
Goalkeeper	(Cyprus) Galini Zachariou (Apollon)			
Defenders	(Cyprus) Lia Siakalli (Aris)	(Romania) Maria Ficzay (Apollon)	(Cyprus) Steffi Hardy (Apollon)	(Cyprus) Marilena Georgiou (Apollon)
Midfielders	(United States) Lainey Higgins (Apollon)		(Romania) Olga Iordăchiuși (Omonia)	(Cyprus) Filippa Savva (Apollon)
Forwards	(Greece) Antigoni Papadopoulou (Omonia)		(Poland) Kinga Ejzel (Aris)	(England) Tash Hudson (Apollon)
