= 2026–27 Cypriot First Division (women) =

30th season of top women's football (soccer) league in Cyprus

Cypriot First Division
- Season: 2026–27
- Dates: 3 October 2026 – TBD
- Matches: 3
- Goals: 27 (9 per match)
- Top goalscorer: Layla Iskandar (6 goals)
- All statistics correct as of 3 October 2026.

The 2026–27 Cypriot First Division season is the 30th and current season of the women's football top-level league in Cyprus. Apollon Ladies are the defending champions.

== Teams ==
=== Changes ===
Withdrew	Joined
Olympiacos Nicosia	APOEL; Xylofagou; Peyia Akamas

=== Stadiums and locations ===
Locations of the 2026–27 Cypriot First Division teams.

Team	City	Stadium	Capacity
APOEL	Nicosia	Doxa Paliometochou Stadium	
Apollon Ladies	Limassol	Parekklisia Community Stadium	3,000
Aris Limassol	Limassol	Kostakis Christoforou Stadium	
Lakatamia	Lakatamia	Anthoupolis Gymnasium Open Court	
Omonia	Nicosia	Kotsiatis Community Stadium	1,500
Peyia Akamas	Peyia	Peyia Municipal Stadium	3,830
Xylofagou	Xylofagou	Makario Stadium Xylofagou	

=== Personnel and sponsorship ===
Team	Head coach	Captain	Kit manufacturer	Main shirt sponsor
APOEL	(Cyprus) Giorgos Georgiou	(Cyprus) Anna-Maria Kyriakou	(Italy) Macron	Cablenet
Apollon Ladies	(Cyprus) Angelos Tsolakis	(Cyprus) Krystyna Freda	(Germany) Adidas	RETAL
Aris Limassol	(Cyprus) Christos Hadjikonstantis	(Greece) Dimitra Karapetsa	(Germany) Adidas	None
Lakatamia	(Cyprus) Stelios Nikolaou	(Cyprus) Panagiota Theofilou	(France) Eldera	EPW
Omonia	(Zimbabwe) Edward Mashinya	(Cyprus) Constantina Kouzali	(Germany) Adidas	None
Peyia Akamas	(Wales) James Thomas	(Cyprus) Loucretia Chrysostomou	(Germany) Adidas	None
Xylofagou	(England) Claire Lawrence	(United States) Megan Cardenas	(Italy) Legea	Sabbianco Properties

=== Managerial changes ===
Team	Outgoing manager	Manner of departure	Date of vacancy	Position in table	Incoming manager	Date of appointment
Aris	(Cyprus) Victoria Zampa	End of contract	15 May 2026	Preseason	(Cyprus) Christos Hadjikonstantis	16 September 2026
Lakatamia	(Serbia) Goran Petkovski	End of contract	30 June 2026	Preseason	(Cyprus) Stelios Nikolaou	30 June 2026

== League table ==
Pos	Team	Pld	W	D	L	GF	GA	GD	Pts	Qualification or relegation
1	Omonia	6	5	0	1	22	2	+20	15	Qualification for the Champions League second qualifying round
2	Peyia Akamas	6	5	0	1	41	1	+40	15	Qualification for the Europa Cup first qualifying round
3	Apollon Ladies	6	5	0	1	20	4	+16	15	
4	Aris Limassol (Note: During the UEFA 2026–27 licencing audit, the CFA found that Aris Limassol did not meet certain athletic criteria and therefore could not secure the licence to participate in UEFA women's competitions for the 2026–27 season. Consequently, the club was penalized with a one-point deduction for the 2026–27 Cypriot First Division season.)	6	3	0	3	8	10	−2	8	
5	Lakatamia	5	1	1	3	7	15	−8	4	
6	Xylofagou	6	1	0	5	9	34	−25	3	
7	APOEL	6	0	1	5	4	38	−34	1	

First match(es) will be played: 22 November 2026. Source: CFA
Rules for classification: 1) Points; 2) Head-to-head points; 3) Goal difference; 4) Number of goals scored; 5) Head-to-head goal difference; 6) Head-to-head away goals scored

== Results ==
Home \ Away	APO	APL	ARI	LAK	OMO	PEY	XYL
APOEL	—	0–6					1–4
Apollon Ladies		—	2–1	3–0	0–3	1–0	
Aris Limassol	3–1		—		0–2	0–3	
Lakatamia	2–2		0–1	—			5–2
Omonia	5–0			7–0	—	0–1	5–1
Peyia Akamas	18–0			7–0		—	12–0
Xylofagou		0–8	2–3				—

Updated to match(es) played on 22 November 2026. Source: CFA
Legend: Blue = home team win; Yellow = draw; Red = away team win.

== Season statistics ==
As of 22 November 2026

=== Goalscorers ===
Rank	Player	Club	Goals
1	(United States) Maddie Kemp	Peyia Akamas	15
2	(Cyprus) Krystyna Freda	Apollon	8
2	(Lebanon) Layla Iskandar	Omonia	8
2	(Germany) Stefanie Sanders	Peyia Akamas	8
5	(United States) Melissa Garcia	Peyia Akamas	6
6	(France) Léa Renoux	Xylofagou	5
7	(England) Tash Hudson	Apollon	4
7	(United States) Olivia Pearse	Apollon	4
7	(Bosnia and Herzegovina) Sydney Japić	Omonia	4
7	(Cyprus) Sophia McBeth	Peyia Akamas	4
7	(United States) Megan Cardenas	Xylofagou	4
