= Maria Panagiotou =

Cypriot footballer (born 2005)

Personal information
- Date of birth: 5 February 2005 (age 21)
- Place of birth: Agios Ioannis, Cyprus
- Position: Midfielder

Team information
- Current team: Asteras Tripolis F.C.

Youth career
- 2015–2016: Apollon Limassol

Senior career*
| Years | Team | Apps | (Gls) |
| 2016–2024 | Apollon Limassol | 126 | (30) |
| 2024–2026 | AEK | 29 | (2) |
| 2026 | OFI | 11 | (4) |
| 2026– | Asteras Tripolis | | |

International career^{‡}
| 2021–2023 | Cyprus U19 | 12 | (1) |
| 2021– | Cyprus | 29 | (1) |
- * Club domestic league appearances and goals as of 20 August 2026 ‡ National team caps and goals as of 11 November 2025.

Maria Panagiotou (Greek: Μαρία Παναγιώτου, born 5 February 2005) is a Cypriot footballer who plays as a midfielder for Greek A Division club Asteras Tripolis and the Cyprus women's national team.

== Club career ==
Panagiotou joines the Apollon Ladies academy at the age of 10 and in 2016 she started making appearances for the first team. She has played in over 150 matches for the club, helping them win 6 league titles, 5 cup titles and 3 super cup titles. Maria made her UWCL debut in 2021 when she came off the bench for 3 minutes in a 2–0 win over Dinamo Minsk.

On 27 July 2024, she signed with Greek club AEK Athens. She made 22 appearances as the club won the 2024–25 Greek A Division and the 2025 Greek Cup.

== International career ==
Panagiotou capped for Cyprus at senior level during the 2023 FIFA Women's World Cup qualification.

== International goals ==
| No. | Date | Venue | Opponent | Score | Result | Competition |
|---|---|---|---|---|---|---|
| 1. | 24 October 2025 | Antonis Papadopoulos Stadium, Larnaca, Cyprus | Albania | 1–2 | 3–2 | 2025 UEFA Women's Nations League play-off matches |

== Career statistics ==
As of 4 June 2026

Appearances and goals by club, season and competition
| Club | Season | League | | | National Cup (Note: Includes Cypriot Cup, Greek Cup) | | Other (Note: Includes Cypriot Super Cup) | | Europe (Note: Includes UEFA Women's Champions League) | | Total | |
| Club | Season | Division | Apps | Goals | Apps | Goals | Apps | Goals | Apps | Goals | Apps | Goals |
|---|---|---|---|---|---|---|---|---|---|---|---|---|
| Apollon | 2016–17 | Cypriot First Division | 9 | 3 | 2 | 0 | – | | – | | 11 | 3 |
| Apollon | 2017–18 | Cypriot First Division | 15 | 2 | 3 | 0 | – | | – | | 18 | 2 |
| Apollon | 2018–19 | Cypriot First Division | 16 | 7 | 2 | 0 | 1 | 0 | – | | 19 | 7 |
| Apollon | 2019–20 | Cypriot First Division | 16 | 9 | 1 | 0 | – | | – | | 17 | 9 |
| Apollon | 2020–21 | Cypriot First Division | 19 | 3 | 3 | 0 | – | | – | | 22 | 3 |
| Apollon | 2021–22 | Cypriot First Division | 16 | 2 | 5 | 0 | 1 | 0 | 4 | 0 | 26 | 2 |
| Apollon | 2022–23 | Cypriot First Division | 21 | 2 | 3 | 0 | – | | 2 | 0 | 26 | 2 |
| Apollon | 2023–24 | Cypriot First Division | 14 | 2 | 4 | 1 | 1 | 1 | 3 | 0 | 22 | 4 |
| Apollon | Total | | 126 | 30 | 23 | 1 | 3 | 1 | 9 | 0 | 161 | 32 |
| AEK | 2024–25 | Greek A Division | 18 | 1 | 4 | 0 | – | | – | | 22 | 1 |
| AEK | 2025–26 | Greek A Division | 11 | 1 | 1 | 0 | – | | 2 | 0 | 14 | 1 |
| AEK | Total | | 29 | 2 | 5 | 0 | 0 | 0 | 2 | 0 | 36 | 2 |
| OFI | 2025–26 | Greek A Division | 11 | 4 | – | | – | | – | | 11 | 4 |
| Career Total | | | 166 | 36 | 28 | 1 | 3 | 1 | 11 | 0 | 208 | 38 |

== Honours ==
=== Club ===
Apollon

- Cypriot First Division (6): 2016/17, 2018/19, 2020/21, 2021/22, 2022/23, 2023/24
- Cypriot Cup (5): 2016/17, 2017/18, 2021/22, 2022/23
- Cypriot Super Cup (3): 2017, 2021, 2023

AEK

- Greek A Division (1): 2024/25
- Greek Cup (1): 2025

=== Individual ===
- PASP BEST11 Women's (4): 2020/21, 2021/22, 2022/23, 2023/24
