= Patrícia Hmírová =

Slovak footballer (born 1993)

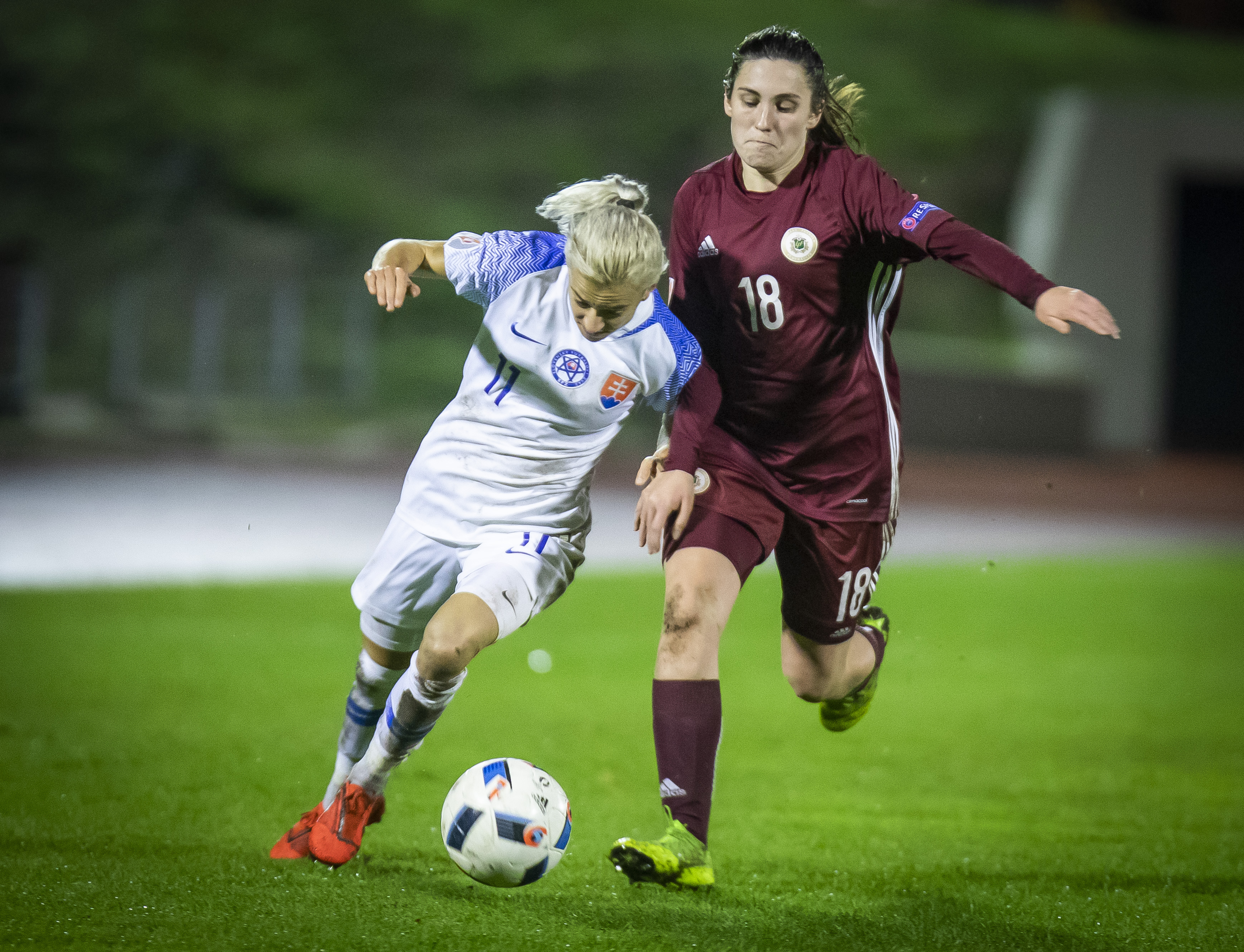
- Hmírová (left) in 2019

Personal information
- Date of birth: 30 November 1993 (age 32)
- Place of birth: Slovakia
- Height: 1.63 m (5 ft 4 in)
- Position: Forward

Team information
- Current team: GKS Katowice
- Number: 17

Youth career
- FK REaMOS Kysucký Lieskovec

Senior career*
Years	Team	Apps	(Gls)
–2012	ŠKF Žilina		
2012–2014	1. FC Katowice		
2014–2015	TS Mitech Żywiec		
2015–2016	Górnik Łęczna		
2016–2017	FC Neunkirch		
2017–2019	Czarni Sosnowiec	53	(36)
2019–2021	Górnik Łęczna	32	(18)
2021–2022	Apollon Limassol		
2022–2024	Sporting de Huelva	53	(4)
2024–2025	Deportivo La Coruña	23	(0)
2025–	GKS Katowice	19	(5)

International career^{‡}
2011	Slovakia U19	3	(0)
2012–	Slovakia	135	(32)
- * Club domestic league appearances and goals as of 20:38, 2 June 2026 (UTC) ‡ National team caps and goals as of 20:41, 2 June 2026 (UTC)

Patrícia Hmírová (born 30 November 1993) is a Slovak professional footballer who plays as a forward for Polish Ekstraliga club GKS Katowice and the Slovakia women's national team.

== Club career ==
Hmírová played in the Slovak Women's First League for ŠKF Žilina before moving to the Polish Ekstraliga where she played for 1. FC Katowice, TS Mitech Żywiec and Górnik Łęczna. She played in the Swiss league for FC Neunkirch in the 2016–17 season, winning the Swiss Women's Super League with her club.

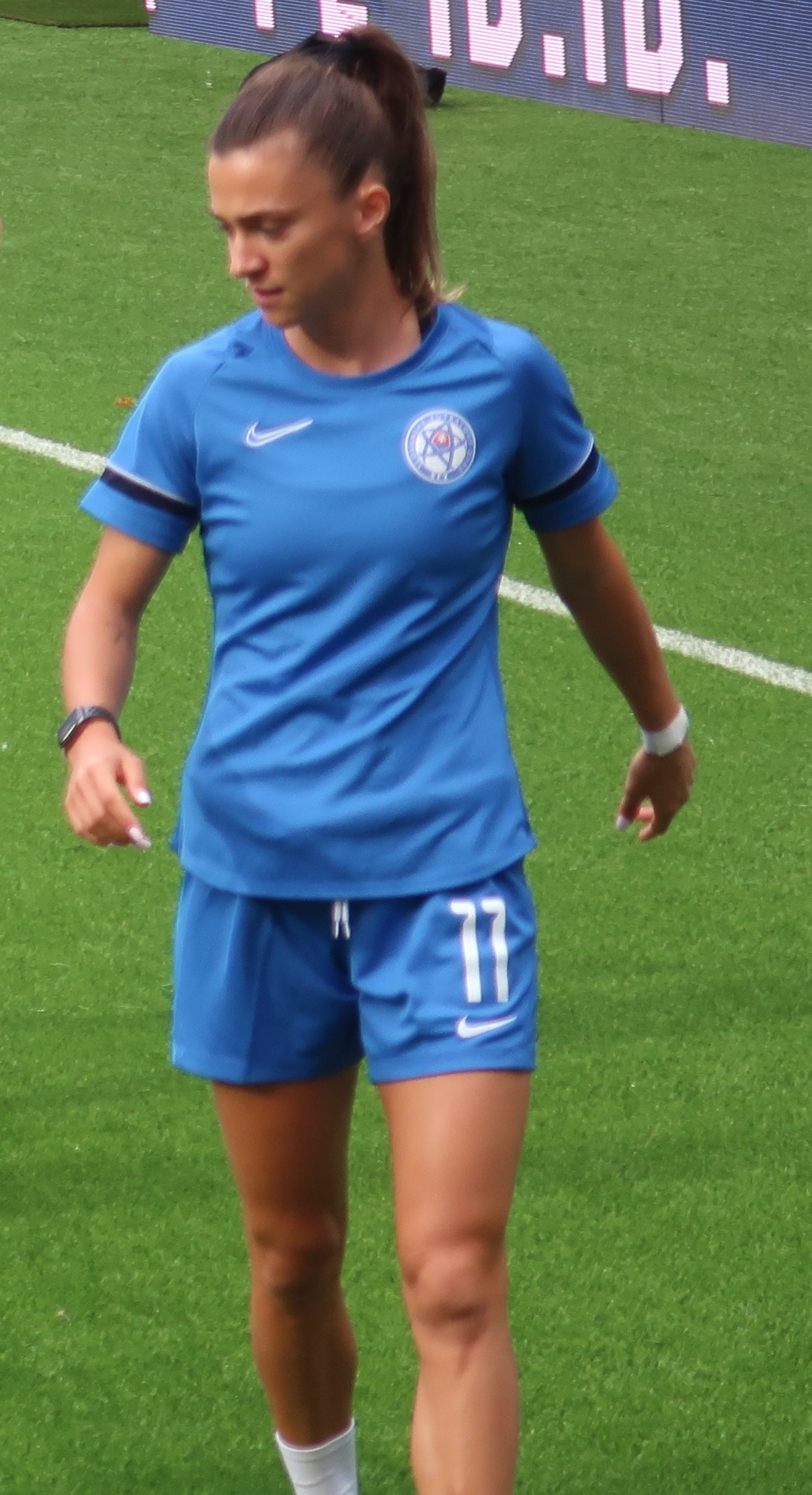
Patrícia Hmírová

In 2017, Hmírová joined Czarni Sosnowiec in the Poland Ekstraliga Kobiet. In the 2017–18 season, she was the top scoring foreigner in the league, with 13 goals. She started the 2018–19 season with six goals in six games, eventually scoring 24 goals in the season to again become the league's top scoring foreigner. Hmírová finished in sixth place in voting for the 2019 Slovak Women's Footballer of the Year awards behind winner Dominika Škorvánková.

In July 2021, Hmírová joined Cypriot club Apollon Limassol. During her time in Cyprus, Hmírová played in the UEFA Women's Champions League. She also won three trophies with Apollon: the Cypriot First Division, the Cypriot Women's Cup and the Cypriot Women's Super Cup.

In July 2022, Hmírová joined Spanish Liga F club Sporting de Huelva. Having spent two seasons in Spanish football, Hmírová moved to fellow Liga F club Deportivo de La Coruña in July 2024.

On 8 July 2025, Hmírová returned to Poland to join reigning champions GKS Katowice.

== International career ==
Hmírová is also a member of the Slovakia women's national football team. By the time of her transfer to Spain in July 2022, she had accumulated 94 appearances for Slovakia, scoring 18 goals. In October 2022, Hmírová made her 100th national team appearance, having scored 19 goals in the process.

== Career statistics ==
=== International ===
Scores and results list Slovakia's goal tally first, score column indicates score after each Hmírová goal.

List of international goals scored by Patrícia Hmírová
No.	Date	Venue	Opponent	Score	Result	Competition
1	27 May 2012	Senec, Slovakia	Slovenia		1–2	Friendly
2	25 August 2012	Haapsalu Stadium, Haapsalu, Estonia	Estonia	1–0	2–0	UEFA Women's Euro 2013 qualifying
3	4 May 2015	Veli Jože, Poreč, Croatia	Austria	1–1	1–1	2015 Istria Cup
4	5 August 2015	Balatonfüred, Hungary	North Macedonia		4–4 (2–4 p)	2015 Balaton Cup
5	5 August 2015	Senec, Slovakia	United Arab Emirates		9–0	Friendly
6	5 August 2015	Senec, Slovakia	United Arab Emirates		9–0	Friendly
7	7 March 2016	Igralište s umjetnom travom, Dajla, Croatia	Croatia	2–0	2–0	2016 Istria Cup
8	12 April 2016	NTC Poprad, Poprad, Slovakia	Poland	2–1	2–1	UEFA Women's Euro 2017 qualifying
9	26 November 2016	Lučko, Croatia	Croatia		5–3	Friendly
10	8 March 2017	Umag, Croatia	Bosnia and Herzegovina		2–0	2017 Istria Cup
11	7 March 2018	GSZ Stadium, Larnaca, Cyprus	Czech Republic	1–1	2–5	2018 Cyprus Women's Cup
12	4 October 2019	Daugava Stadium, Liepāja, Latvia	Latvia	1–1	2–1	UEFA Women's Euro 2022 qualifying
13	8 March 2020	AEK Arena, Larnaca, Cyprus	Mexico	1–0	2–2	2020 Cyprus Women's Cup
14	11 March 2020	GSZ Stadium, Larnaca, Cyprus	Finland	2–4	2–4	2020 Cyprus Women's Cup
15	23 October 2020	Illovszky Rudolf Stadion, Budapest, Hungary	Hungary	1–0	2–1	UEFA Women's Euro 2022 qualifying
16	27 October 2020	NTC Senec, Senec, Slovakia	Latvia	1–0	2–0	UEFA Women's Euro 2022 qualifying
17	27 October 2020	NTC Senec, Senec, Slovakia	Latvia	2–0	2–0	UEFA Women's Euro 2022 qualifying
18	10 June 2021	NTC Senec, Senec, Slovakia	Chile	1–0	1–0	Friendly
19	14 June 2021	NTC Senec, Senec, Slovakia	Romania	1–1	3–1	Friendly
20	14 June 2021	NTC Senec, Senec, Slovakia	Romania	2–1	3–1	Friendly
21	1 September 2022	Tengiz Burjanadze Stadium, Gori, Georgia	Georgia	1–0	4–0	2023 FIFA Women's World Cup qualification
22	26 September 2023	NTC Senec, Senec, Slovakia	Croatia	1–0	4–0	2023–24 UEFA Women's Nations League
23	26 September 2023	NTC Senec, Senec, Slovakia	Croatia	3–0	4–0	2023–24 UEFA Women's Nations League
24	26 September 2023	NTC Senec, Senec, Slovakia	Croatia	4–0	4–0	2023–24 UEFA Women's Nations League
25	23 February 2024	LNK Sporta Parks, Riga, Latvia	Latvia	3–0	3–0	2024 UEFA Women's Nations League
26	5 April 2024	NTC Senec, Senec, Slovakia	Israel	1–0	2–0	UEFA Women's Euro 2025 qualifying
27	21 February 2025	Anton Malatinský Stadium, Trnava, Slovakia	Faroe Islands	1–0	3–0	2025 UEFA Women's Nations League
28	30 May 2025	Futbal Tatran Arena, Prešov, Slovakia	Gibraltar	2–0	11–0	2025 UEFA Women's Nations League
29	30 May 2025	Futbal Tatran Arena, Prešov, Slovakia	Gibraltar	5–0	11–0	2025 UEFA Women's Nations League
30	3 June 2025	Tórsvøllur, Tórshavn, Faroe Islands	Faroe Islands	1–0	2–1	2025 UEFA Women's Nations League
31	3 March 2026	NTC Poprad, Poprad, Slovakia	Latvia	1–0	3–2	2027 FIFA Women's World Cup qualification
32	14 April 2026	Töölö Football Stadium, Helsinki, Finland	Finland	2–3	2–4	2027 FIFA Women's World Cup qualification

== Honours ==
Górnik Łęczna

- Ekstraliga: 2019–20
- Polish Cup: 2019–20

Apollon Limassol

- Cypriot First Division: 2021–22
- Cypriot Women's Cup: 2021–22
- Cypriot Women's Super Cup: 2021

GKS Katowice

- Polish Cup: 2025–26
