= Kim Björkegren =

Swedish association football manager (born 1981)

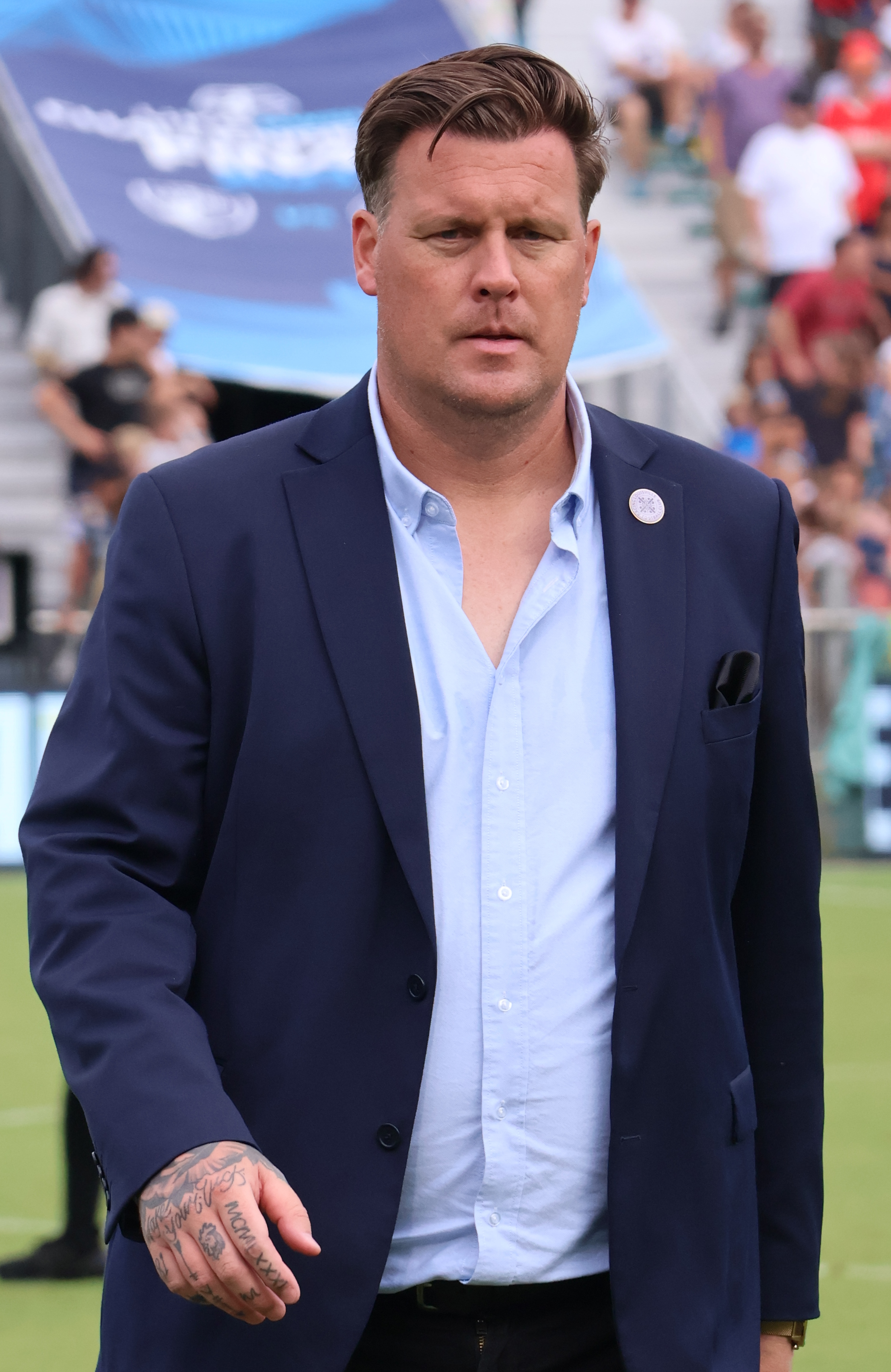
- Björkegren with Racing Louisville FC in 2023

Personal information
- Full name: Lars Kim Björkegren
- Date of birth: 18 December 1981 (age 44)
- Place of birth: Linköping, Sweden

Team information
- Current team: Ghana (women's head coach); Ghana (men's caretaker coach)

Managerial career
- Years: Team
- 2015: IK Gauthiod Men
- 2016: Hovås Billdal IF
- 2017: Linköpings FC
- 2018–2019: Beijing BG Phoenix F.C.
- 2020–2021: Apollon Ladies FC
- 2022–2023: Racing Louisville FC
- 2025–: Ghana
- 2026–: Ghana (men / caretaker)
Medal record
2020/21 Coach of the year
2020/21 Winner Cypriot League
2020/21 Runner-up Cypriot cup
2018/19 3rd Place Chinese FA cup
2018/19 3rd Place Chinese League cup
2017 Runner-up Swedish cup
2017 Winner Damallsvenskan
2017 Nominated coach of the year in Sweden
2015 Winner DM

Lars Kim Björkegren (born 18 December 1981) is a Swedish football manager who is the head coach of the Ghana women's national team and current caretaker head coach of the men's national team. He has previously managed Linköpings FC, where he won the Damallsvenskan, as well as Beijing BG Phoenix F.C. in the Chinese Women's Super League (CWSL), Cyprus champions Apollon Ladies FC, and Racing Louisville FC of the National Women's Soccer League (NWSL). Björkegren is the second Swedish manager after Sven-Göran Eriksson to win two domestic titles in two different countries.

== Managing career ==
Björkegren started his managing career in his hometown of Linköping, where he managed the Karle IF's men's team in Sweden's fourth tier. After climbing the ladder with men's teams such as Kisa BK and IK Gauthiod, Björkegren began to manage women's football after accepting a role as manager for Hovås/Billdal in 2016.

Björkegren went to IK Gauthiod for a role in the youth team of Tyresö FF, where he was meant to take over the senior team after Tony Gustavsson's departure. But when the club folded, Björkegren moved to Grästorp and IK Gauthiod. The spell in Gauthiod was successful for Björkegren, who led his team to a fifth-place finish in the Swedish division 2. The team also qualified for the Svenska Cupen by winning the DM final against IFK Tidaholm with 3–1. After one season with IK Gauthiod, Björkegren decided to leave and pursue an opportunity to manage a team at a higher level.

Björkegren replaced Martin Sjögren as manager of reigning Damallsvenskan champions Linköpings FC in 2017 with the goal of defending the title as the champions. Björkegren and Linköping secured the title in the 2017 Damallsvenskan with two rounds to go, despite losing Pernille Harder, Fridolina Rolfö, and Stina Blackstenius before the start of the season and selling its captain Magdalena Eriksson to Chelsea mid-season. Björkegren then led Linköpings FC to its best-ever position in the UEFA Women's Champions League, where he guided the team to the quarterfinals.

In January 2018, Björkegren was presented as the new manager for CWSL club Beijing BG Phoenix, making him the first Swedish manager in the league. Björkegren appointed recently retired Swedish player Elena Sadiku as his assistant and fitness coach, and signed Spanish star Vero Boquete and Swedish striker Marija Banušić. Björkegren left Beijing BG Phoenix after the 2019 season to return to Europe for his family, noting upon his appointment to Apollon Ladies FC in June 2020 that he expected to become a father in August 2020.

In June 2020, women's Cypriot First Division champions Apollon Ladies FC announced Björkegren as manager for their 2020–21 campaign. Apollon had a goal to defend the championship title and advance further in UEFA Women's Champions League. Björkegren led Apollon Ladies FC to win the domestic league in Cyprus in an undefeated season, winning 64 of 64 points with a +105 goal differential. His victory made history by making him the first Swedish manager to win a league in two different countries. After the success with Apollon Ladies FC, Björkegren was named Coach of the Year by the Pancyprian Footballers Association (PASP).

On 9 December 2021, it was announced that Björkegren would become the new head coach of Racing Louisville FC in the United States, which had completed its first season in the NWSL several weeks earlier.

On 16 January, 2025 Björkegren was appointed head coach of the Ghana women's national team.

== Honours ==
Apollon Ladies FC

- Cypriot First Division: 2020–21
- Cypriot Women's Cup: Runner-up 2020–21
- PASP Best Coach: 2020–21

Beijing BG Phoenix

- Chinese Women's FA Cup: 3rd place 2018
- Chinese Women's Super Cup: 3rd place 2018

Linköpings FC

- Damallsvenskan: 2017
- Svenska Cupen Dam: Runner-up 2017
