= Maria Matthaiou =

Cypriot footballer

Personal information
- Full name: Maria Matthaiou
- Date of birth: 26 April 1997 (age 29)
- Place of birth: Cyprus
- Position: Goalkeeper

Team information
- Current team: Athlone Town
- Number: 1

Senior career*
Years	Team	Apps	(Gls)
2013–2014	Ledra Nicosia	5	(0)
2014-2016	Lefkothea	22	(0)
2016–2017	Omonia	14	(0)
2017–2020	Lefkothea	44	(0)
2020–2024	Apollon	63	(2)
2025–	Athlone Town	10	(0)

International career^{‡}
2015	Cyprus U19	2	(0)
2019–	Cyprus	33	(0)
- * Club domestic league appearances and goals as of 10 May 2026 ‡ National team caps and goals as of 10 May 2026

Maria Matthaiou (born 26 April 1997) is a Cypriot footballer who plays as a goalkeeper for Athlone Town and the Cyprus women's national team.

== Career ==
=== Athlone Town ===
Matthaiou joined the midlands club ahead of the 2025 season she made a total of 7 league appearances in their 2025 title winning season as second choice keeper to Megan Plaschko. She also made an appearance in the second leg of Athlone's tie against Glasgow City in the UEFA Women's Europa Cup. She Re-Signed for Athlone ahead of the 2026 Season after helping lift the League and Cup double in her first season.

=== Cyprus ===
She made her Senior International debut for the Cyprus women's national football team in 2019 against Finland she currently has 33 caps for her country

== Honours ==
=== Apollon Limassol ===
- Cypriot First Division 2020–21, 2021–22, 2022–23, 2023–24
- Cypriot Cup 2021–22, 2022–23, 2023–2024
- Cypriot Super Cup 2021, 2023, 2024

=== Athlone Town ===
- LOI Women's Premier Division, 2025
- FAI Women's Cup, 2025
- President's Cup, 2025
