= 2026–27 Cypriot Women's Cup =

Παγκύπριο Πρωτάθλημα Κυπέλλου Γυναικών

Tournament details
- Country: Cyprus
- Dates: 4 November 2026 – TBD
- Teams: 7

The 2026–27 Cypriot Women's Cup is the 24th edition of the Cypriot women's association football national cup organized by the Cyprus Football Association (CFA). Apollon Ladies are the defending champions.

== Schedule and format ==
Participation is mandatory for all top division clubs. The first round will feature six teams playing in single-leg ties, decided by a draw, with the three winners advancing to the semi-finals. Due to an odd number of teams, one club will be directly drawn into the next round. The semi-finals will be played over two legs, home and away, with the two winners advancing to the final.

Round	Draw date	Match date	Fixtures	Clubs	Divisions entering this round
Quarter-finals	27 October	4 November	3	7 → 3	6 First Division clubs
Semi-finals	8 December		4	4 → 2	1 First Division clubs
Final	8 December		1	2 → 1	None

== First round ==
The draw was completed by the CFA on 27 October 2026. APOEL was given a bye to the semi-finals.

4 November 2026	Aris Limassol	9–0	Xylofagou	Limassol
13:00 EET	Mylona 11', 13', 38'; Ejzel 26', 52'; Ramírez 45+1'; Stylianou 50', 55' (pen.); Kyriakidi 70'	Report		Stadium: Kostakis Christoforou Stadium; Referee: Anna Giorka

4 November 2026	Apollon	2–0	Omonia	Parekklisia, Limassol
13:00 EET	Aristodimou 48'; Hudson 67'	Report		Stadium: Parekklisia Community Stadium; Referee: Giannis Konstantinou

4 November 2026	Peyia Akamas	4–0	Lakatamia	Peyia
13:00 EET	Sanders 11', 38', 80'; McBeth 49'	Report		Stadium: Peyia Municipal Stadium; Referee: Zoi Stavrou

== Statistics ==
As of 4 November 2026

Rank	Player	Club	Goals
1	(Cyprus) Sophia Mylona	Aris Limassol	3
1	(Germany) Stefanie Sanders	Peyia Akamas	3
2	(Poland) Kinga Ejzel	Aris Limassol	2
2	(Cyprus) Domna Stylianou	Aris Limassol	2
3	(Cyprus) Elena Aristodimou	Apollon	1
3	(England) Tash Hudson	Apollon	1
3	(Cyprus) Christina Kyriakidi	Aris Limassol	1
3	(Canada) Jullien Ramirez	Aris Limassol	1
3	(Cyprus) Sophia McBeth	Peyia Akamas	1
