= Vanessa Gilles =

Canadian soccer player (born 1996)

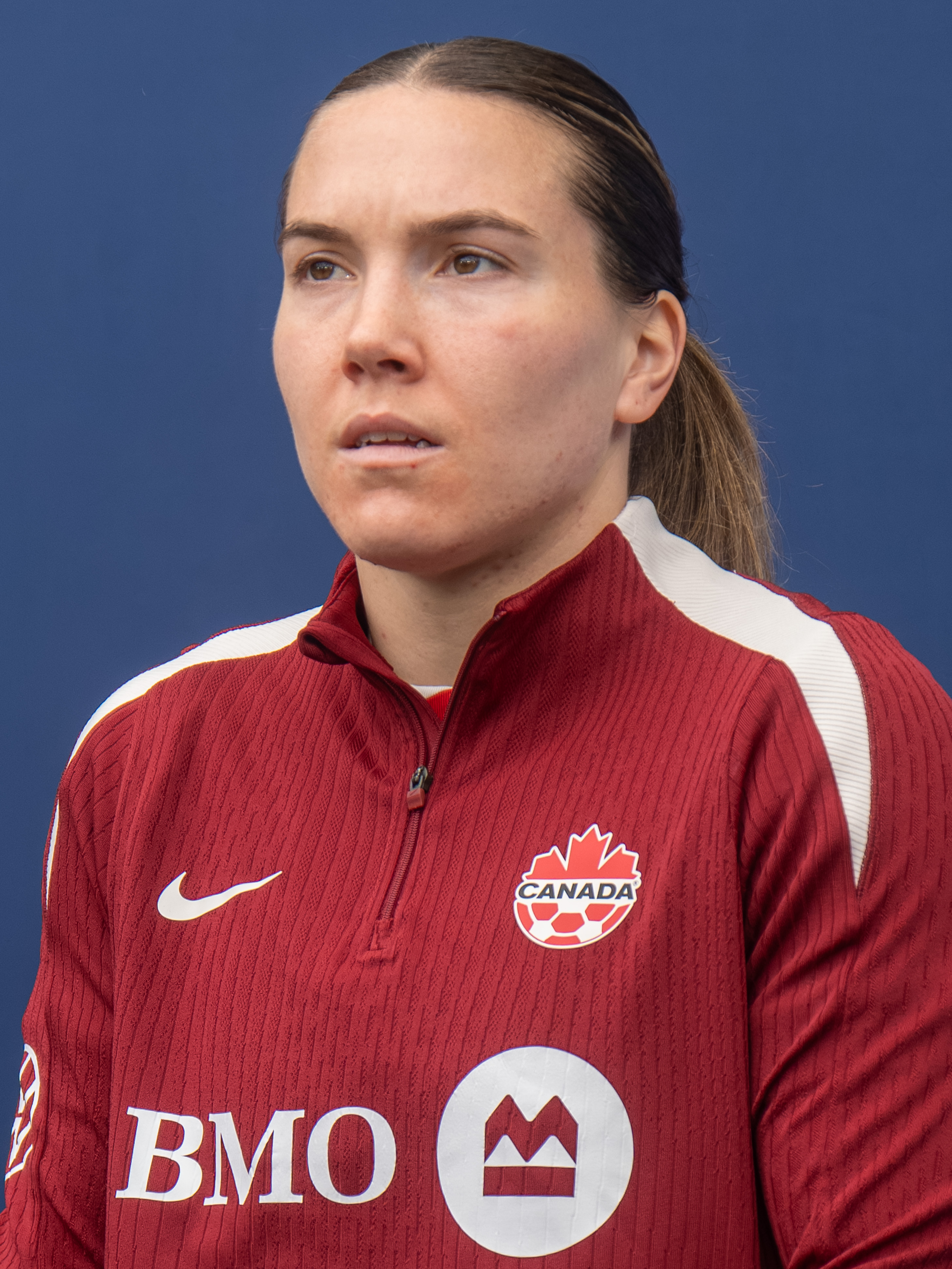
- Gilles with Canada in 2026

Personal information
- Full name: Vanessa Brigitte Gilles
- Date of birth: March 11, 1996 (age 30)
- Place of birth: Châteauguay, Quebec, Canada
- Height: 1.74 m (5 ft 9 in)
- Position: Centre-back

Team information
- Current team: Bayern Munich
- Number: 2

Youth career
- 2012–2014: Ottawa Capital United SC

College career
| Years | Team | Apps | (Gls) |
| 2014–2017 | Cincinnati Bearcats | 82 | (17) |

Senior career*
| Years | Team | Apps | (Gls) |
| 2017 | West Ottawa SC | 9 | (2) |
| 2018 | Apollon Limassol | 11 | (10) |
| 2018–2021 | Bordeaux | 65 | (4) |
| 2022–2025 | Angel City | 7 | (1) |
| 2022–2025 | → Lyon (loan) | 46 | (12) |
| 2025– | Bayern Munich | 20 | (6) |

International career^{‡}
| 2018 | France U23 | 1 | (0) |
| 2019– | Canada | 63 | (11) |
Medal record
Women's football
Representing Canada
Olympic Games
| Gold medal – first place | 2020 Tokyo | Team |
- * Club domestic league appearances and goals as of 6 November 2026 ‡ National team caps and goals as of June 9, 2026

Vanessa Brigitte Gilles (born March 11, 1996) is a Canadian professional soccer player who plays as a centre-back for Frauen-Bundesliga club Bayern Munich and the Canada national team.

== Early career ==
Originally a tennis player, in her teenage years, Gilles quit the sport to switch to soccer. After briefly attempting to play as a goalkeeper, she became a defender. She played for FC Capital United in Ottawa, Ontario, winning a league title in 2013. At the 2013 Canada Summer Games, she won a bronze medal with Team Ontario.

== College career ==
Gilles then attended the University of Cincinnati in the United States, playing for the Cincinnati Bearcats from 2014 to 2017. She was named 2015 American Athletic Conference Most Outstanding Defensive Player of the Tournament and, in 2016, became the first Bearcats women's athlete to earn all-conference first team accolades in both the preseason and postseason in American Athletic Conference history. In 2017, she was named American Athletic Conference Co-Defensive Player of the Year. When she won an Olympic gold medal in 2021, she became the fifth athlete in Bearcats history to do so.

== Club career ==
=== West Ottawa SC ===
In May 2017, Gilles joined League1 Ontario side West Ottawa SC. She scored two goals in nine appearances in the regular season, and was selected to the 2017 League1 Ontario All-Star third team. She was also selected to represent League1 Ontario in the All-Star game against the Team Ontario squad competing in the 2017 Canada Games.

=== Apollon Limassol ===
In January 2018, Gilles signed a short-term contract with Cypriot First Division side Apollon Limassol. She made her professional debut for the club on January 14, starting in a 1–1 draw with Anorthosis Famagusta. She scored 10 goals in 11 appearances for the club in the regular season, and made three appearances in the Cypriot Women's Cup tournament, helping Apollon Limassol win the final against Pyrgos Limassol on penalties.

=== Bordeaux ===
In July 2018, Gilles signed a two-year contract with Division 1 Féminine side Girondins de Bordeaux. In May 2020, she signed a two-year extension with Bordeaux.

=== Angel City FC ===
After 3.5 years at Bordeaux, Gilles transferred to expansion NWSL club Angel City FC for an undisclosed fee. She signed a contract for 2022 with an option for 2023. On April 29, 2022, in Angel City's first NWSL match, Gilles scored the first goal in Angel City history to secure a 2–1 victory against North Carolina Courage.

==== Lyon (loan) ====
In September 2022, Gilles signed for Lyon on a season-long loan. Her loan was later extended until June 2025.

On December 20, 2024, Vanessa Gilles has been named the 2024 Canadian Women’s Player of the Year, earning the honor for the first time in her career.

=== Bayern Munich ===
On May 20, 2025, Gilles signed with Frauen-Bundesliga club Bayern Munich on a three-year contract through June 30, 2028. Having scored three goals in her opening six matches in all competitions with the club, on October 1, 2025, it was announced that she had suffered a lower leg muscular injury which would keep her "sidelined for several weeks."

== International career ==
Although born in Quebec, Gilles was eligible to play for France as her father was born in Paris. In November 2018, Gilles was called into the France U23 camp, and played for Les Bleues in a 5–2 victory against Belgium.

=== Canada ===
On January 18, 2019, she made her unofficial debut for Canada in a behind-closed-doors friendly against Switzerland. On November 10, she made her official debut in a 3–0 victory against New Zealand at the 2019 Yongchuan International Tournament.

She was named to the Canadian national team for the 2020 Summer Olympics. She scored the decisive penalty shootout goal for Canada in the quarterfinals against Brazil. Although her penalty shootout attempt in the final of the tournament against Sweden hit the crossbar, Canada won the game and she would earn her first Olympic gold medal. She was named to the roster for the 2023 FIFA Women's World Cup.

Gilles was called up to the Canada squad for the 2022 CONCACAF W Championship, where Canada finished as runners-up.

Gilles was called up to the 23-player Canada squad for the 2023 FIFA Women's World Cup.

Gilles was called up to the Canada squad for the 2024 CONCACAF W Gold Cup, which Canada finished as semifinalists.

Gilles was a member of the Canadian national team for the 2024 Summer Olympics in Paris.

== Personal life ==
On March 20, 2019, Gilles spoke at the United Nations in New York City, as part of the 63rd Session of the Commission on the Status of Women.

For the first twelve years of her life, her family lived in Shanghai, before returning to Canada to live in Ottawa. She graduated high school from École secondaire publique Louis-Riel and then graduated with a bachelor's degree from the University of Cincinnati with a major in criminal justice and a minor in IT.

== Career statistics ==
=== Club ===
As of 6 November 2026

Appearances and goals by club, season and competition
| Club | Season | League | | | National cup (Note: Includes Cypriot Cup, Coupe de France, DFB-Pokal) | | Continental | | Other | | Total | |
| Club | Season | Division | Apps | Goals | Apps | Goals | Apps | Goals | Apps | Goals | Apps | Goals |
|---|---|---|---|---|---|---|---|---|---|---|---|---|
| West Ottawa SC | 2017 | League1 Ontario | 9 | 2 | — | | — | | — | | 9 | 2 |
| Apollon Limassol | 2017–18 | Cypriot First Division | 11 | 10 | 3 | 0 | — | | — | | 14 | 10 |
| Girondins de Bordeaux | 2018–19 | D1 Féminine | 20 | 1 | 1 | 0 | — | | — | | 21 | 1 |
| Girondins de Bordeaux | 2019–20 | D1 Féminine | 16 | 0 | 3 | 0 | — | | — | | 19 | 0 |
| Girondins de Bordeaux | 2020–21 | D1 Féminine | 19 | 1 | 1 | 0 | — | | — | | 20 | 1 |
| Girondins de Bordeaux | 2021–22 | D1 Féminine | 10 | 2 | 0 | 0 | 4 (Note: Appearances in UEFA Women's Champions League) | 2 | — | | 14 | 4 |
| Girondins de Bordeaux | Total | | 65 | 4 | 5 | 0 | 4 | 2 | 0 | 0 | 74 | 6 |
| Angel City FC | 2022 | NWSL | 7 | 1 | — | | 0 | 0 | 6 (Note: Appearances in NWSL Challenge Cup) | 1 | 13 | 2 |
| Lyon (loan) | 2022–23 | Première Ligue | 13 | 3 | 3 | 0 | 6 | 1 | — | | 22 | 4 |
| Lyon (loan) | 2023–24 | Première Ligue | 18 | 3 | 2 | 1 | 11 | 3 | 1 (Note: Appearance in Trophée des Championnes) | 0 | 32 | 7 |
| Lyon (loan) | 2024–25 | Première Ligue | 14 | 5 | 0 | 0 | 5 | 2 | 0 | 0 | 19 | 7 |
| Lyon (loan) | Total | | 45 | 11 | 5 | 1 | 22 | 6 | 1 | 0 | 62 | 14 |
| Bayern Munich | 2025–26 | Frauen-Bundesliga | 14 | 3 | 5 | 0 | 7 | 0 | 1 (Note: Appearance in DFB-Supercup) | 0 | 27 | 3 |
| Bayern Munich | 2026–27 | Frauen-Bundesliga | 6 | 3 | 1 | 2 | 2 | 0 | 0 | 0 | 9 | 5 |
| Bayern Munich | Total | | 20 | 6 | 6 | 2 | 9 | 0 | 1 | 0 | 36 | 8 |
| Career total | | | 157 | 33 | 19 | 3 | 35 | 8 | 8 | 1 | 219 | 45 |

=== International ===
As of April 14, 2026
Scores and results list Canada's goal tally first, score column indicates score after each Gilles goal.

List of international goals scored by Vanessa Gilles
| No. | Date | Venue | Opponent | Score | Result | Competition |
|---|---|---|---|---|---|---|
| 1 | February 20, 2022 | Carrow Road, Norwich, England | Germany | 1–0 | 1–0 | 2022 Arnold Clark Cup |
| 2 | April 9, 2022 | BC Place, Vancouver, Canada | Nigeria | 2–0 | 2–0 | Friendly |
| 3 | February 19, 2023 | Geodis Park, Nashville, United States | Brazil | 1–0 | 2–0 | 2023 SheBelieves Cup |
| 4 | April 6, 2024 | Mercedes Benz Stadium, Atlanta, United States | Brazil | 1–0 | 1–1 (4–2 p) | 2024 SheBelieves Cup |
| 5 | July 28, 2024 | Stade Geoffroy-Guichard, Saint-Étienne, France | France | 2–1 | 2–1 | 2024 Summer Olympics |
| 6 | July 31, 2024 | Stade de Nice, Nice, France | Colombia | 1–0 | 1–0 | 2024 Summer Olympics |
| 7 | December 3, 2024 | Pinatar Arena, San Pedro del Pinatar, Spain | South Korea | 4–1 | 5–1 | Friendly |
| 8 | February 22, 2025 | Pinatar Arena, San Pedro del Pinatar, Spain | Mexico | 1–0 | 2–0 | 2025 Pinatar Cup |
| 9 | March 1, 2026 | Geodis Park, Nashville, United States | Colombia | 1–0 | 4–1 | 2026 SheBelieves Cup |
| 10 | April 14, 2026 | Arena Pantanal, Cuiabá, Brazil | South Korea | 2–1 | 3–1 | 2026 FIFA Series |
| 11 | April 14, 2026 | Arena Pantanal, Cuiabá, Brazil | South Korea | 3–1 | 3–1 | 2026 FIFA Series |

== Honours ==
Apollon Limassol

- Cypriot Women's Cup: 2017–18

Lyon

- Première Ligue: 2022–23, 2023–24, 2024–25
- Coupe de France Féminine: 2022–23
- Trophée des Championnes: 2023
- UEFA Women's Champions League runner-up: 2023–24

Bayern Munich

- Bundesliga: 2025–26
- DFB-Pokal: 2025–26
- DFB-Supercup Frauen: 2025

Canada

- Summer Olympics: 2021

Individual

- Canada Soccer Player of the year: 2024 & 2025
- CONCACAF W Championship Best XI: 2022
- UNFP Première Ligue team of the year: 2024–25
- LFFP Première Ligue team of the season: 2024–25
- League1 Ontario All-Star Third Team: 2017
