= Katie Lockwood =

English footballer (born 1998)

Personal information
- Full name: Katie Jayne Lockwood
- Date of birth: 1 April 1998 (age 28)
- Place of birth: Huddersfield, England
- Height: 1.65 m (5 ft 5 in)
- Position: Midfielder

Team information
- Current team: Charlton Athletic
- Number: 15

College career
Years	Team	Apps	(Gls)
2016–2017	Eastern Florida Titans	25	(18)
2018	Alabama Crimson Tide	10	(0)
2019	Campbell Fighting Camels	16	(9)

Senior career*
Years	Team	Apps	(Gls)
2020–2022	Apollon		
2022	KIF Örebro DFF	26	(4)
2022–2023	Hibernian	16	(6)
2023–2024	Hearts	25	(16)
2024–2026	Glasgow City	0	(0)
2026–	Charlton Athletic	0	(0)
- * Club domestic league appearances and goals

Katie Jayne Lockwood is an English footballer who plays as a midfielder for Women's Super League club Charlton Athletic.

She has previously played for Scottish clubs Glasgow City, Heart of Midlothian and Hibernian, as well as for Swedish club Örebro and Cypriot club Apollon.

== Career ==
Katie began her football career as a student at Campbell University playing for the Campbell Fighting Camels. Katie Lockwood signed her first professional football contract with Apollon.

=== KIF Örebro DFF ===
Lockwood signed for the Swedish club KIF Örebro DFF in 2022.

=== Hibs ===
On 1 January 2023, Lockwood joined Scottish club Hibernian on a contract until the end of the season.

=== Hearts ===
In July 2023, Lockwood departed Hibs, joining Edinburgh rivals Heart of Midlothian on a one-year deal.

Lockwood finished the season as the club's top scorer, and won the Player of the Year Award for the 2023–24 season.

=== Glasgow City ===
In July 2024, Lockwood joined Glasgow City on a two-year deal.

=== Charlton Athletic ===
In January 2026, Lockwood joined Charlton Athletic.

== Honours ==
Apollon Ladies F.C.

- Cypriot First Division Champion: 2020–21
- Cypriot Super Cup: 2021

Heart of Midlothian

- Player of the Year: 2023–24
- Scottish Women's Cup: Runner-up 2023–24

Charlton Athletic

- Women's Super League 2 play-off: 2025–26
