= Christiana Solomou =

Cypriot footballer

Christiana Solomou (Solo)
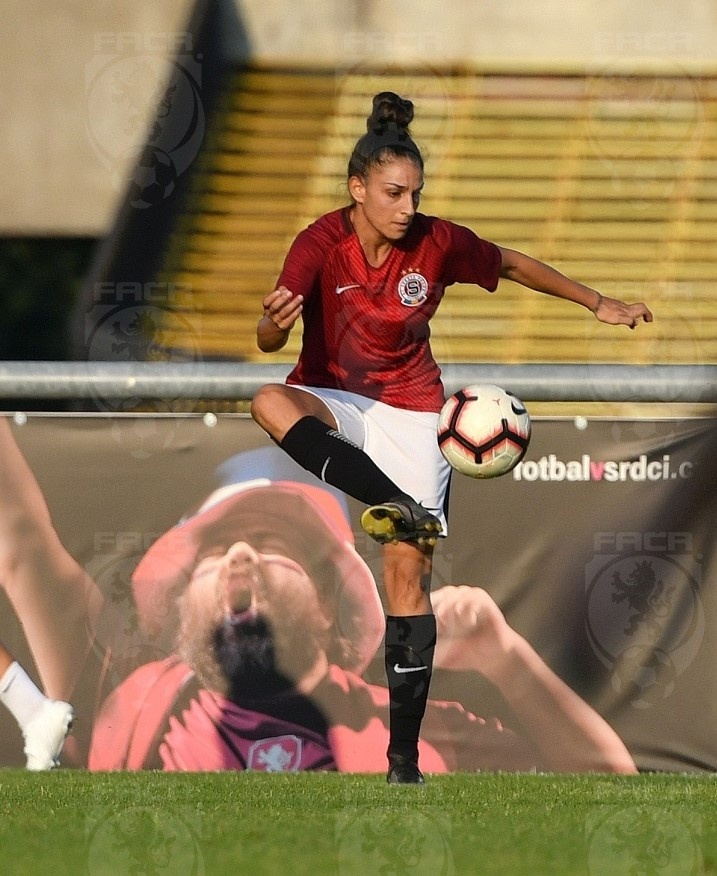

Personal information
- Date of birth: 10 June 1993 (age 33)
- Place of birth: Paphos, Cyprus
- Height: 1.68 m (5 ft 6 in)
- Position: Midfielder

Youth career
- 2001–2008: Pafia

College career
Years	Team	Apps	(Gls)
2013–2014	Central Connecticut Blue Devils		

Senior career*
Years	Team	Apps	(Gls)
2009–2013	Apollon Ladies		
2014–2017	Apollon Ladies		
2017–2019	Barcelona FA		
2019–2020	Sparta Prague	9	(1)

International career^{‡}
2009–	Cyprus		
- * Club domestic league appearances and goals ‡ National team caps and goals as of 15 May 2020

Christiana Solomou "Solo" is a Cypriot football midfielder, who played for Sparta Prague in the Czech First Division.

== Early life ==
Born to Nikolas and Meropi in Paphos, Cyprus. Solomou was raised with her two older brothers (Kostas and Kyriakos) and one older sister, Eleni. She began playing football at an early age with her mother and sister in a local football club, Pafia FC and her father was among her first coaches. At the age of 15 she was moved to Limassol, Cyprus and she started to play for Apollon Ladies.

== Club career ==
- 2009–2013 Apollon Ladies
- 2013–2014 Central Connecticut State University
- 2014–2017 Apollon Ladies
- 2017–2019 Barcelona FA
- 2019–2020 Sparta Prague

== International career ==
She is a member of the Cyprus national team. Solomou made her debut for the national team U19 in a match against Ukraine U19 on 19 September 2009.

== Honors and awards ==
=== Club ===
Apollon Ladies

- Cypriot First Division: 2009, 2010, 2011, 2012, 2013, 2015, 2016, 2017
- Cypriot Women's Cup: 2009, 2010, 2011, 2012, 2015, 2016, 2017
- Cypriot Women's Super Cup: 2009, 2010, 2011, 2015, 2016

Barcelona FA

- Cypriot First Division: 2018
- Cypriot Women's Cup: 2019
- Cypriot Women's Super Cup: 2018

=== Individual ===
- Best Women Football Player in Cyprus: 2010, 2011, 2012, 2015

== Personal life ==
Solomou married football player Pambos Kairinos on 10 June 2018. They met in Limassol where they both played football.

== Education ==
She went to the primary school named B' Primary school of Geroskipou. She continued her education at Agias Paraskeuis gymnasium. Then, she went to the high school named Giannakis Taliwtis in Geroskipou and took her degree in 2011. She moved for a year in United States (2013–2014) and studied exercise science at Central Connecticut State University. She came back to Cyprus and studied social work at Frederick University in Limassol and took her bachelor's degree in 2017.
