= Angelos Tsolakis =

Cypriot footballer (born 1969)

Personal information
- Date of birth: 23 August 1969 (age 57)
- Position: Forward

Senior career*
Years	Team	Apps	(Gls)
1986–1998	Apollon Limassol FC		
1998–1999	AEL Limassol FC		
1999–2000	Apollon Limassol FC		
2000–2002	Olympiakos Nicosia		

International career
1989–1998	Cyprus	7	(1)

Managerial career
- 2009–2011: Enosi Neon Parekklisias
- 2013–2014: Apollon Ladies
- 2018: Cyprus WU19
- 2019–2023: Cyprus Women
- 2023: Apollon Limassol FC (caretaker)
- 2026–: Apollon Ladies
- * Club domestic league appearances and goals

Angelos Tsolakis (born 23 August 1969) is a retired Cypriot football striker and a football manager. He is the head coach of Apollon Ladies. He has previously coached the Cyprus women's national football team.

== Honours ==
=== Player ===
Apollon

- Cypriot First Division: 1990–91, 1990–91
- Cypriot Cup: 1991–92

=== Manager ===
EN Parekklisia

- Cypriot Fourth Division: 2009–10

Apollon Ladies

- Cypriot First Division: 2013–14, 2025–26
- Cypriot Cup: 2013–14, 2025–26
- Cypriot Super Cup: 2013, 2026
