= Steffi Hardy =

Cypriot footballer (born 1996)

Personal information
- Date of birth: 29 June 1996 (age 30)
- Place of birth: Workington, England
- Position: Centre-back

Team information
- Current team: Apollon Ladies
- Number: 6

Youth career
- –2013: Blackburn Rovers

College career
| Years | Team | Apps | (Gls) |
| 2014–2017 | South Alabama Jaguars | 85 | (14) |

Senior career*
| Years | Team | Apps | (Gls) |
| 2013–2014 | Blackburn Rovers | 12 | (1) |
| 2018 | Grindavík | 14 | (0) |
| 2019– | Apollon Ladies | 83 | (18) |

International career^{‡}
| 2025– | Cyprus | 14 | (2) |
- * Club domestic league appearances and goals as of 09:35, 9 April 2025 (UTC) ‡ National team caps and goals as of 10:12, 19 June 2026 (UTC)

Steffi Hardy (born 29 June 1996) is a professional footballer who plays as a centre-back for Apollon Ladies. Born in England, she plays for the Cyprus national team.

== Club career ==
Hardy began her senior career playing for Blackburn Rovers, making 12 league appearances for the club during the 2013–14 season in the Northern Division of the FA Women's National League. In 2014, she enrolled at the University of South Alabama to study exercise science and play college soccer. After graduating, Hardy joined Besta deild kvenna side Grindavík ahead of the 2018 season. After a season, she joined Cypriot First Division side Apollon Ladies in January 2019.

== International career ==
Born in England, Hardy qualified to represent the Cyprus national team after five-years of residency. On 5 April 2024, Hardy made her international debut, playing the full match in a 3–0 defeat to Belarus in UEFA Women's Euro 2025 qualifying. In June 2025, she scored her first international goal during a 2025 UEFA Women's Nations League victory over Georgia.

== International goals ==
| No. | Date | Venue | Opponent | Score | Result | Competition |
|---|---|---|---|---|---|---|
| 1. | 3 June 2025 | Mikheil Meskhi Stadium, Tbilisi, Georgia | Georgia | 1–0 | 2–1 | 2025 UEFA Women's Nations League |
| 2. | 2 March 2026 | Dasaki Stadium, Dasaki Achnas, Cyprus | Faroe Islands | 1–0 | 1–1 | Friendly |

== Personal life ==
Hardy is the twin sister of fellow professional footballer Rio Hardy and the pair attended Stainburn School in Workington together.

== Honours ==
Apollon Ladies

- Cypriot First Division: 2020–21, 2021–22, 2022–23, 2023–24
- Cypriot Women's Cup: 2021–22, 2022–23, 2023–24
- Cypriot Women's Super Cup: 2023, 2024
