= Antri Violari =

Cypriot footballer (born 1996)

Andri Violari
Personal information
- Date of birth: 27 September 1996 (age 30)
- Place of birth: Paralimni, Cyprus
- Position: Forward

Team information
- Current team: AEK Athens
- Number: 19

Senior career*
| Years | Team | Apps | (Gls) |
| 2013–2014 | AEK Kokkinochorion | 11 | (11) |
| 2014–2016 | Apollon | 26 | (59) |
| 2016–2019 | Barcelona FA | 20 | (16) |
| 2019–2020 | Pyrgos Limassol | 2 | (3) |
| 2020–2022 | Nea Salamis Famagusta | 37 | (64) |
| 2022–2023 | Famalicão | 9 | (6) |
| 2023–2024 | Ankara BB Fomget GSK | 10 | (1) |
| 2024 | Kdz. Ereğli Belediye Spor | 12 | (3) |
| 2024– | AEK Athens | 57 | (42) |

International career^{‡}
| 2012–2014 | Cyprus U19 | 9 | (1) |
| 2019– | Cyprus | 44 | (26) |
- * Club domestic league appearances and goals as of 4 June 2026 ‡ National team caps and goals as of 7 November 2025

Andri Violari (born 27 September 1996) is a Cypriot footballer who plays as a forward for AEK Athens in the Greek A Division and the Cyprus national team.

== Personal life ==
Antri Violari was born in Paralimni town of Famagusta, Cyprus on 27 September 1996.

== Club career ==
Late August 2023, Violari moved to Turkey, and joined the 2022–23 Women's Super League champion Ankara BB Fomget GSK to play in the 2023–24 UEFA Women's Champions League. She took part in two UEFA matches, and scored one goal. She played in the first half of the 2023–24 Turkish Super League, capped in ten games and scored three goals.

In the beginning of February 2024, she transferred to Kdz. Ereğli Belediye Spor for the second half of the 2023–24 Super League season. She scored five goals in twelve matches played.

== International career ==
Violari has been capped for the Cyprus national team, appearing for the team during the UEFA Women's Euro 2021 qualifying cycle.

She played seven matches at the 2023–24 UEFA Women's Nations League C, and scored one goal.

List of international goals scored by Antri Violari
| No. | Date | Venue | Opponent | Score | Result | Competition |
|---|---|---|---|---|---|---|
| 1. | 2 March 2019 | Voithitikó Gípedo Parekklisiás, Parekklisia, Cyprus | Estonia | 1–0 | 1–0 | 2019 Aphrodite Women Cup |
| 2. | 17 September 2021 | Dinamo Stadium, Minsk, Belarus | Belarus | 1–3 | 1–4 | 2023 FIFA Women's World Cup qualification |
| 3. | 6 October 2022 | GSZ Stadium, Larnaca, Cyprus | Liechtenstein | 2–0 | 5–0 | Friendly |
| 4. | 9 October 2022 | GSZ Stadium, Larnaca, Cyprus | Liechtenstein | 2–1 | 2–1 | Friendly |
| 5. | 26 September 2023 | Dasaki Stadium, Dasaki Achnas, Cyprus | Faroe Islands | 1–0 | 1–0 | 2023–24 UEFA Women's Nations League |
| 6. | 31 October 2023 | Tórsvøllur, Tórshavn, Faroe Islands | Faroe Islands | 1–0 | 1–0 | 2023–24 UEFA Women's Nations League |
| 7. | 21 February 2025 | AEK Arena, Larnaca, Cyprus | Malta | 1–0 | 2–1 | 2025 UEFA Women's Nations League |
| 8. | 25 February 2025 | AEK Arena, Larnaca, Cyprus | Georgia | 1–0 | 2–1 | 2025 UEFA Women's Nations League |
| 9. | 25 February 2025 | AEK Arena, Larnaca, Cyprus | Georgia | 2–0 | 2–1 | 2025 UEFA Women's Nations League |
| 10. | 4 April 2024 | Dasaki Stadium, Achnas, Cyprus | Andorra | 1–1 | 2–2 | 2025 UEFA Women's Nations League |
| 11. | 3 June 2025 | Mikheil Meskhi Stadium, Tbilisi, Georgia | Georgia | 2–0 | 2–1 | 2025 UEFA Women's Nations League |
| 12. | 24 October 2025 | Antonis Papadopoulos Stadium, Larnaca, Cyprus | Albania | 2–2 | 3–2 | 2025 UEFA Women's Nations League play-off matches |
| 13. | 24 October 2025 | Antonis Papadopoulos Stadium, Larnaca, Cyprus | Albania | 3–2 | 3–2 | 2025 UEFA Women's Nations League play-off matches |

== Honours ==
Apollon

- Cypriot First Division (2): 2014–15, 2015–16
- Cypriot Cup (2): 2014–15, 2015–16
- Cypriot Super Cup (1): 2015

Barcelona

- Cypriot First Division (1): 2017–18
- Cypriot Cup (1): 2018–19
- Cypriot Super Cup (1): 2018

Famalicão

- Taça de Portugal (1): 2022–23

AEK

- Greek A Division (1): 2024–25
- Greek Cup (1): 2025

Individual

- PSAPP Best XI: 2024–25
