= Solomou =

Solomou is a surname. Notable people with the surname include:

- Athos Solomou (born 1985), Cypriot footballer
- Christiana Solomou, Cypriot footballer
- Despoina Solomou (born 1990), Greek swimmer
- Emilios Solomou (born 1971), Cypriot writer
- Maria Solomou (born 1974), Greek actress
- Solomos Solomou, British economist
