= Kyriaki Vasiliou =

Cypriot footballer

Personal information
- Date of birth: 17 June 1997 (age 29)
- Place of birth: Cyprus,
- Position: Attacking midfielder

Team information
- Current team: AC Omonia

Senior career*
Years	Team	Apps	(Gls)
- AEL Larissa
- Lefkothea Latsion
- AC Omonia

International career^{‡}
2013–2015	Cyprus U19	8	(0)
2019–	Cyprus	3	(0)
- * Club domestic league appearances and goals ‡ National team caps and goals as of 00:35, 28 July 2022 (UTC)

Kyriaki Vasiliou (Greek: Κυριακή Βασιλείου; born 17 June 1997) is a Cypriot footballer who plays as a midfielder for First Division club Omonia FC and the Cyprus women's national team.

== Career ==
=== Club career ===
While playing for local team Kokkinohorion, Vasiliou received the award for the 2015 Best Young Footballer of the Year at the televised KOP awards.

Salonica's top division team Aris showed an interest in Vasiliou while, in 2018, she was studying Physical Education in the city, an interest reciprocated by the player though the transfer did not materialize, since she agreed terms with Panserraikos F.C. of Serres.

In 2021, Vasiliou expressed her "frustration" with what she perceived as lack of equal treatment and pay between men and women footballers in Cyprus, and her wish to play "abroad." In the 2021–22 season she played for Lefkothea Latsion, scoring in the second match of the season, a 2–1 win against Pafos Geroskipou. In spite of her comments before the season, she signed with Cypriot First Division club AC Omonia after the end of the season. In August 2023 Vasiliou signed a contract extension with Omonia.

=== International career ===
In February 2019, Vasiliou was called up to the Cyprus women's national team while a player of AEL Larissa, for the 2019 Aphrodite Women Cup. She played in the first half of a 2–1 friendly win against Lithuania on the opening day of the tournament. She continued to be involved with the national team, receiving a further call-up in November 2022 for friendly matches against Greece, and a 10-day training session in May 2023.

== See also ==
- Sport in Cyprus
- Gender pay gap in sports
