= Natasa =

Natasa may refer to:

- Natasa (album), a 2007 Greek folk-pop release by Natasa Theodoridou
- Natasa Theodoridou (born 1970), Greek singer
- Natasa Pazaïti (born 1966), Greek public figure (Anastasia)
- Natasa Lappa (born 2001), Cypriot windsurfer and sailor
- Natasa Hadjivasili (born 1989), Cypriot football player (Anastasia)
- Nataša, Slavic feminine given name
- Nataša (2001 film), a Serbian drama
