= 2014–15 Cypriot First Division (women) =

Cypriot First Division (women)
- Season: 2014–15
- Matches played: 72
- Goals scored: 444 (6.17 per match)

The 2014–15 Cypriot First Division (women) was the 17th season of women's league football under the Cyprus Football Association.

The league was won by Apollon Limassol, its seventh consecutive title. By winning, Apollon qualified to 2015–16 UEFA Women's Champions League.

== League table ==
Pos	Team	Pld	W	D	L	GF	GA	GD	Pts	Qualification
1	Apollon Limassol	16	16	0	0	131	4	+127	48	Qualification to Champions League
2	AE Ammochostos	16	13	1	2	104	16	+88	40	
3	Lefkothea Nicosia	16	12	1	3	76	12	+64	37	
4	Kokkinochoria	16	8	1	7	57	31	+26	25	
5	Pascal/Ledra	16	8	0	8	33	44	−11	24	
6	AMOK Chrysomilia	16	7	1	8	28	41	−13	22	
7	Pafia Pafos	16	2	1	13	4	67	−63	7	
8	Dafni Troullon Aradipou	16	2	0	14	8	116	−108	6	
9	Champions Ypsona	16	1	1	14	3	113	−110	4	
