= Xenia Georgiou =

Cypriot footballer (born 1988)

Personal information
- Date of birth: 24 October 1988 (age 38)
- Position: Centre back

Team information
- Current team: Lefkothea

Senior career*
Years	Team	Apps	(Gls)
2004–2009	AEK Kokkinochorion		
2009–2016	Lefkothea		
2016–2017	Omonia	11	(3)
2017–	Lefkothea		

International career^{‡}
2017	Cyprus	1+	(0+)
- * Club domestic league appearances and goals ‡ National team caps and goals as of 11 March 2017

Xenia Georgiou (Greek: Ξένια Γεωργίου; born 24 October 1988) is a Cypriot footballer who plays as a centre back for First Division club Lefkothea Latsion. She has been a member of the Cyprus women's national team.

== Club career ==
Georgiou started playing in 2004. Her first club was AEK Kokkinochorion. In 2009, she joined Lefkothea Latsion. On 25 September 2016, she moved to AC Omonia. One year later, she rejoined Lefkothea Latsion.

== International career ==
Georgiou capped for Cyprus at senior level during the 2017 Aphrodite Cup, including a 1–2 loss to Latvia on 12 March 2017.
