= Amanda Visco =

American soccer player (born 1997)

Personal information
- Birth name: Amanda Paige Visco
- Date of birth: October 20, 1997 (age 29)
- Height: 5 ft 7 in (1.70 m)
- Position: Defender

Youth career
- PDA Arsenal

College career
Years	Team	Apps	(Gls)
2016–2019	Rutgers Scarlet Knights	60	(4)

Senior career*
Years	Team	Apps	(Gls)
2020–2021	CD Badajoz	27	(0)
2021	Apollon	–	(–)
2021	Valadares Gaia	–	(–)
2022	NJ/NY Gotham FC	0	(0)
- * Club domestic league appearances and goals as of 02:59, May 14, 2026 (UTC)

Amanda Paige Jelinsky (née Visco; born October 20, 1997) is an American former professional soccer player who played as a defender. She played college soccer for the Rutgers Scarlet Knights before playing professionally for Spanish club CD Badajoz, Cypriot club Apollon, Portuguese club Valadares Gaia, and NJ/NY Gotham FC of the National Women's Soccer League (NWSL).

== Early life ==
Visco grew up in Manalapan Township, New Jersey, as one of three siblings. She attended Colts Neck High School, joining the soccer team initially as a midfielder before developing into a four-year starter on the backline. Visco was a three-time Player of the Year for her school, earned first-team all-state and all-metro honors, and was named MVP of the 2015 High School All-American game in Raleigh, North Carolina. She helped Colts Neck win one state championship, one conference championship, and two sectional titles. Visco played club soccer for PDA Arsenal, earning one U17 National Finals Best XI accolade in her youth career.

== College career ==
In her first season playing collegiately for the Rutgers Scarlet Knights, Visco started all 23 of her team's matches, setting a figure that would later prove to be a career-high. She also scored two goals and was named to the 2016 Big Ten all-freshman team. As a sophomore in 2017, Visco combined with the Scarlet Knights' defensive unit to record nine straight clean sheets at the start of the season and set a program record in minutes without conceding a goal. The following year, she continued to earn playing time, starting in 17 of Rutgers' 20 games.

As a senior, Visco entered the year as a team captain, with the goal of leading the Scarlet Knights to a Big Ten championship title. Although Rutgers did not manage to secure the Big Ten title, Visco found success, earning All-Region First Team and All-Big Ten second team honors for the first time. In October 2019, she was named the conference's Defensive Player of the Week after her performances across two games. She scored one goal on the season, the lone tally in a 1–0 victory over Iowa. Following the conclusion of her collegiate career, Visco was named Rutgers' 2020 Big Ten Medal of Honor recipient.

== Club career ==
On July 7, 2020, Spanish club CD Badajoz announced that they had signed Visco to her first professional contract ahead of the team's first season back in the top-flight Primera Iberdrola. In her first season playing soccer professionally, Visco made 27 appearances, starting in all but 4 matches.

In July 2021, Visco joined Cypriot First Division champions Apollon. She spent half a season in Cyprus, gaining experience in the UEFA Women's Champions League qualifying rounds. Later that year, Visco played for Portuguese Campeonato Nacional Feminino club Valadares Gaia.

National Women's Soccer League team NJ/NY Gotham FC signed Visco to a short-term national team replacement player contract in June 2022, as the club worked to find replacements for four squad members summoned to help their countries qualify for the 2023 FIFA Women's World Cup. Visco did not make a competitive appearance for Gotham FC before her contract expired.

== International career ==
Visco has received call-ups to training camps with the United States under-19 national team.

== Personal life ==
On April 18, 2025, Visco married Michael Jelinsky. Following the conclusion of her playing career, Visco has worked as the assistant director of ticket services for Rutgers Athletics.

== Honors and awards ==
Individual

- Second-team All-Big Ten: 2019
- Big Ten all-freshman team: 2016
