= Sophia Nearchou =

Cypriot footballer

Personal information
- Date of birth: 7 April 1992 (age 34)
- Position: Forward

Senior career*
Years	Team	Apps	(Gls)
- Apollon Ladies
- Liverpool

International career^{‡}
2010	Cyprus U19	3	(0)
2013	Cyprus	1+	(0+)
- * Club domestic league appearances and goals ‡ National team caps and goals as of 12 January 2013

Sophia Nearchou (Greek: Σοφία Νεάρχου; born 7 April 1992) is a Cypriot footballer who plays as a forward. She has been a member of the Cyprus women's national team.
