= Teodora Drăgoescu =

Romanian footballer (born 1986)

Personal information
- Date of birth: 6 December 1986 (age 39)
- Place of birth: Hunedoara, Romania
- Position: Defender

Youth career
- 1993–2000: CFR Regal Bucuresti

Senior career*
Years	Team	Apps	(Gls)
2000–2002	SN Constanța		
2002–2009	CFF Clujana		
2009–2012	Apollon Limassol		
2012–2016	TSV Schott Mainz		

International career^{‡}
2003–2010	Romania	9+	(0+)
- * Club domestic league appearances and goals ‡ National team caps and goals as of 25 August 2010

Teodora Drăgoescu (born 6 December 1986) is a Romanian footballer who plays as a defender. She has been a member of the Romania women's national team.
