= Natasa Hadjivasili =

Cypriot footballer

Personal information
- Full name: Anastasia Hadjivasili
- Date of birth: 27 February 1989 (age 37)

Senior career*
Years	Team	Apps	(Gls)
- AEK Kokkinochorion
2017–2019	Chrysomilia		

International career^{‡}
2013	Cyprus	1+	(0+)
- * Club domestic league appearances and goals ‡ National team caps and goals as of 12 January 2013

Anastasia Hadjivasili (Greek: Αναστασία Χατζηβασίλη; born 27 February 1989), known as Natasa Hadjivasili (Greek: Νατάσα Χατζηβασίλη), is a Cypriot footballer. She has been a member of the Cyprus women's national team. She is the twin sister of Dimitra Hadjivasili.
