= Liliana Kostova =

Bulgarian footballer (born 1988)

Personal information
- Full name: Liliana Ivanova Kostova
- Date of birth: 15 March 1988 (age 38)
- Place of birth: Bulgaria
- Position: Midfielder

Senior career*
Years	Team	Apps	(Gls)
2004-2007	Super Sport Sofia		
2007	FK Khimki	15	(6)
2008	Nadezhda Noginsk	11	(4)
2009–2010	Super Sport Sofia	1	(4)
2009–2014	Apollon Limassol	67	(91)
2012–2013	Zorkiy	11	(1)
2014	Rossiyanka	3	(0)
2015–2017	Medyk Konin	50	(36)
2017–2018	AGSM Verona	10	(5)
2018–2019	Fiorentina	2	(1)
2019–2020	Diósgyőri VTK	13	(4)
2020–2021	Czarni Sosnowiec	11	(6)
2021	NSA Sofia		
2022	Czarni Sosnowiec	9	(2)

International career
2004-2007	Bulgaria U19	9	(5)
2009–2014	Bulgaria	34	(8)
- * Club domestic league appearances and goals

Liliana Ivanova Kostova (Bulgarian: Лиляна Костова Иванова, born 15 March 1988) is a Bulgarian former footballer who played as a midfielder. She played for Apollon Limassol in Cyprus' First Division, Super Sport Sofia, with whom she first played the UEFA Women's Cup, and FK Khimki and Nadezhda Noginsk of Russia's Championship, and for Fiorentina in the Italian Serie A.

She was a member of the Bulgarian national team.

== Honours ==
Medyk Konin

- Ekstraliga: 2015–16, 2016–17
- Polish Cup: 2015–16, 2016–17

Czarni Sosnowiec

- Ekstraliga: 2020–21
- Polish Cup: 2020–21, 2021–22

== Career statistics ==
=== Club ===
Club	Season	Division	League		Cup		Continental		Total	
Club	Season	Division	Apps	Goals	Apps	Goals	Apps	Goals	Apps	Goals
Super Sport	2009-10	Bulgarian Women's Championship	1	4					1	4
Khimki	2007	Russian Women's League	15	6					15	6
Nadezhda Noginski	2008	Russian Women's League	11	4					11	4
Apollon Ladies	2009-10	Cyprus Women's League	15	27					15	27
Apollon Ladies	2010-11	Cyprus Women's League	14	30			5	4	19	34
Apollon Ladies	2011-12	Cyprus Women's League	14	13			5	6	19	19
Apollon Ladies	2012-13	Cyprus Women's League	12	15			5	7	17	22
Apollon Ladies	2013-14	Cyprus Women's League					5	1	5	1
Apollon Ladies	2014-15	Cyprus Women's League	12	6					12	6
Apollon Ladies	Total		67	91			20	18	87	109
Rossiyanka	2014	Russian Women's League	3	0					3	0
Medyk Konin	2015-16	Ekstraklasa Kobiet	11	7					11	7
Medyk Konin	2016-17	Ekstraklasa Kobiet	23	18	1	1	5	0	29	19
Medyk Konin	2017-18	Ekstraklasa Kobiet	16	11	1	2	5	4	22	17
Medyk Konin	Total		50	36	2	3	10	4	62	43
Verona	2017-18	Seria A Feminina	10	5			2	0	12	5
Fiorentina	2018-19	Serie A Feminina	2	1					2	1
Dyosgori	2019-20	Hungarian Women's League	13	4					13	4
Czarni Sosnowiec	2020-21	Ekstraklasa Kobiet	11	6					11	6
Czarni Sosnowiec	2021-22	Ekstraklasa Kobiet	9	2	3	1			12	3
Czarni Sosnowiec	Total		20	8	3	1			23	9
Total career			192	159	5	4	34	22	231	185
