= Eleni Giannou =

Cypriot footballer

Personal information
- Full name: Eleni Giannou
- Date of birth: 16 September 1993 (age 33)
- Place of birth: Cyprus

Team information
- Current team: Apollon
- Number: 7

Senior career*
Years	Team	Apps	(Gls)
2010–2013	Apollon		
2014–2016	AEK Kokkinochorion	20	(13)
2016–2019	PAOK		
2019	Lefkothea	13	(3)
2020	Pyrgos Limassol	4	(2)
2020–2022	Apollon	20	(2)
2022–2023	Hibernian	7	(0)
2023–	Apollon	29	(4)

International career^{‡}
2009–2011	Cyprus U19	5	(1)
2019–	Cyprus	18	(0)
- * Club domestic league appearances and goals as of 5 August 2024 ‡ National team caps and goals as of 5 August 2024

Eleni Giannou (born 16 September 1993) is a Cypriot footballer who plays as a midfielder and the Cyprus women's national team.

== Career ==
Giannou has been capped for the Cyprus national team, appearing for the team during the UEFA Women's Euro 2021 qualifying cycle.
