= Filippa Savva =

Cypriot footballer

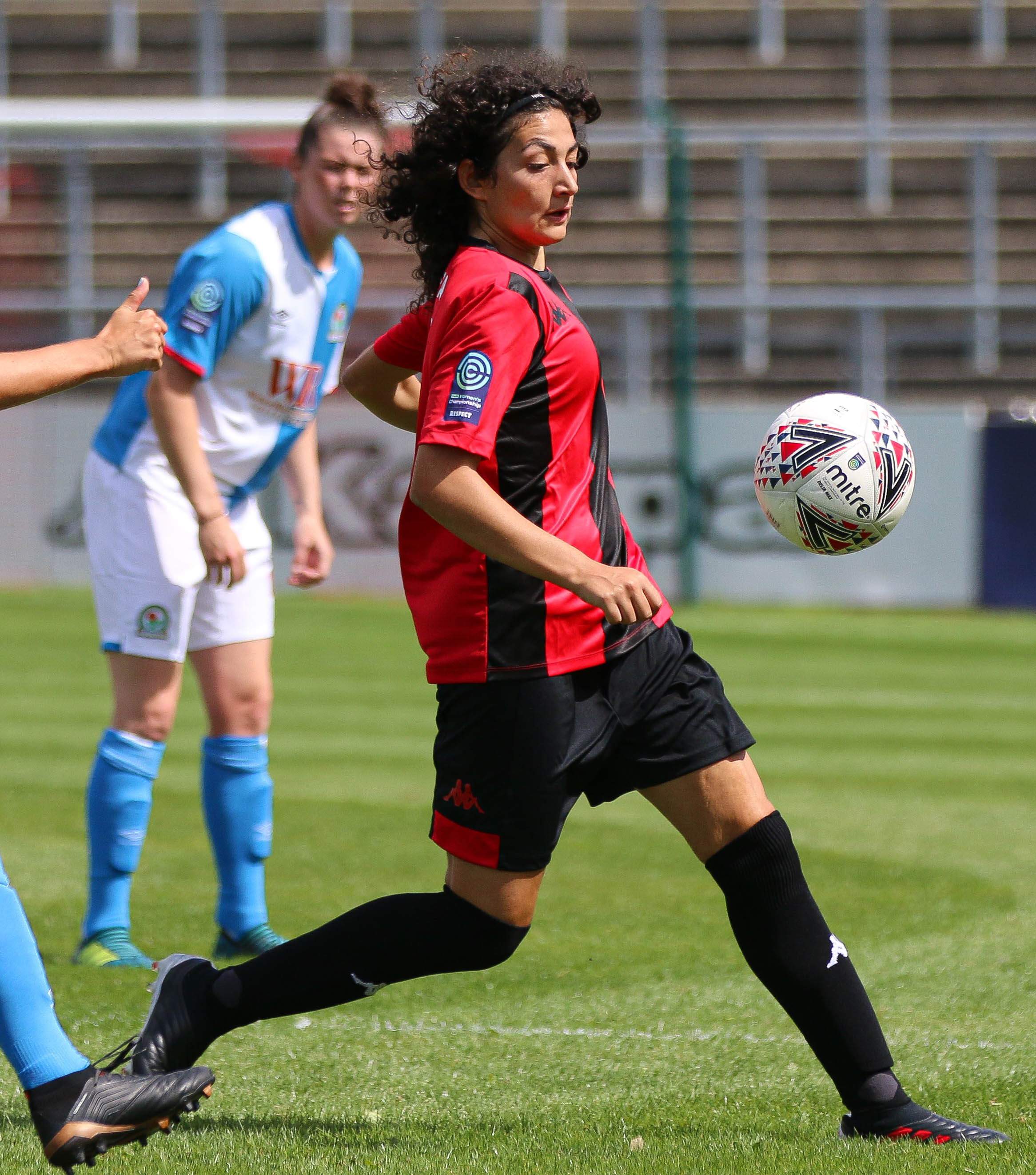
- Filippa Savva playing for Lewes in August 2019

Personal information
- Date of birth: 28 May 1999 (age 27)
- Place of birth: Cyprus
- Position: Midfielder

Team information
- Current team: Apollon Ladies F.C.
- Number: 8

Senior career*
Years	Team	Apps	(Gls)
2011–2017	AEK Kokkinochorion		
2018–2019	Liverpool Feds		
2019–2021	Lewes	23	(0)
2021–2022	Nea Salamis	12	(1)
2022–	Apollon	52	(4)

International career^{‡}
2015–2017	Cyprus U19	8	(0)
2019–	Cyprus	32	(1)
- * Club domestic league appearances and goals as of 14:40, 9 August 2025 (UTC) ‡ National team caps and goals as of 00:45, 28 July 2022 (UTC)

Filippa Savva (born 28 May 1999) is a Cypriot footballer who plays as a midfielder for Apollon Ladies F.C. and has appeared for the Cyprus women's national team.

== Club career ==
Savva joined AEK Kokkinochorion in 2011. She was still at the club in the 2016–17 Cypriot First Division, playing 12 games and scoring three goals. In February 2018, Savva transferred to Liverpool Feds. In August 2019, Fran Alonso, the manager who signed Savva for Liverpool Feds, brought her to his new club Lewes. In May 2021, Savva left Lewes.

== International career ==
Savva has been capped for the Cyprus national team, appearing for the team during the UEFA Women's Euro 2021 qualifying cycle.

== International goals ==
No.	Date	Venue	Opponent	Score	Result	Competition
1.	26 November 2021	AEK Arena – Georgios Karapatakis, Larnaca, Cyprus	Belarus	1–1	1–1	2023 FIFA Women's World Cup qualification
