= Jullien Ramirez =

Canadian soccer player (born 1998)

Personal information
- Full name: Jullien Amara Ramírez
- Date of birth: June 11, 1998 (age 28)
- Place of birth: Calgary, Canada
- Height: 1.67 m (5 ft 6 in)
- Position: Forward

Team information
- Current team: Aris Limassol
- Number: 21

College career
Years	Team	Apps	(Gls)
2017–2020	Mount Royal Cougars		

Senior career*
Years	Team	Apps	(Gls)
2021–2022	Viktoria Berlin	0	(0)
2022–2023	MFA Žalgiris	34	(9)
2026–	Aris Limassol		
- * Club domestic league appearances and goals as of 20 March 2024

Jullien Amara Ramírez (born June 11, 1998) is a Canadian professional associate football player who plays as a striker or winger for Cypriot club Aris Limassol.

== Club career ==
She also played for Viktoria Berlin. In 2023, Ramirez signed for the Lithuanian Women's A League team MFA Žalgiris.

Ramírez joined Cypriot club Aris Limassol for the 2026–27 season.

== International career ==
Ramirez is of Chilean descent and wishes to play for the Chile national team.
