= Solomos Solomou (economist) =

British economist

Solomos Solomou is a University Reader in Economics who teaches at the University of Cambridge. He is also a Fellow of Peterhouse, Cambridge. He was initially educated at Kennington School, Camberwell, London before gaining a place at The London School of Economics where he obtained a First Class Honours B.Sc. (Econ.) in 1979, a M.Sc. (Econ.), London School of Economics 1980 and Ph.D. University of Cambridge 1983. He lists his interests as "The following in historical perspective, long cycles; business cycles; trade policy; exchange rate regimes and economic performance; weather and sectoral fluctuations".

He received a Pilkington teaching prize from the University of Cambridge in 1991.

== Books ==
Solomou is the author of books including:

- Phases of Economic Growth 1850-1973: Kondratieff Waves and Kuznets Swings (Cambridge University Press, 1988)
- Protectionism and Economic Revival: The British Interwar Economy (with Michael Kitson, Cambridge University Press, 1990)
- Themes in Macroeconomic History: The UK Economy, 1919—1939 (Cambridge University Press, 1996)
- Economic Cycles: Long Cycles and Business Cycles Since 1870 (Manchester University Press, 1998)
