= Edward Mashinya =

Zimbabwean football coach and former player (born 1984)

Personal information
- Full name: Edward Tinashe Mashinya
- Date of birth: February 22, 1984 (age 42)
- Place of birth: Harare, Zimbabwe
- Height: 1.91 m (6 ft 3 in)

Youth career
- Highlanders Football Club

Senior career*
Years	Team	Apps	(Gls)
2006–2009	Omonia	0	(0)
2007–2008	→ Adonis Idaliou (loan)	26	(19)
2008–2009	→ Onisilos Sotira (loan)	21	(8)
2009	PAEEK	9	(1)
2010	Onisilos Sotira	11	(4)
2010–2011	Omonia Aradippou	27	(12)
2011	APOP Kinyras Peyias	14	(11)
2012–2013	Ethnikos Achnas	35	(4)
2013	Onisilos Sotira	8	(2)
2014–2015	Karmiotissa Polemidion	33	(22)
2015–2016	Olympiakos Nicosia	24	(20)
2016–2017	Ermis Aradippou	26	(13)
2017–2018	Othellos Athienou	12	(6)
2018–2019	Karmiotissa	34	(15)
2019–2020	PAEEK	20	(19)
2020–2021	MEAP Nisou	24	(14)
Total		324	(170)

Managerial career
- 2020–2021: MEAP Nisou (player-assistant coach)
- 2021–2022: OMONOIA 29ης Μαΐου (assistant head coach & analyst)
- 2021–2022: MEAP Nisou (U16 head coach)
- 2023: Liverpool FC International Academy Cyprus (academy head coach)
- 2025–: OMONOIA FC Women (head coach)
- * Club domestic league appearances and goals as of 15:00, 26 April 2021 (UTC)

Edward Tinashe Mashinya (born February 22, 1984, in Harare, Zimbabwe) is a Zimbabwean football coach and former professional player. He is currently the head coach of the Omonia Nicosia Women's Team. A former striker, Mashinya played for several clubs in Cyprus, including Omonia, Ethnikos Achnas, Olympiakos Nicosia, and MEAP Nisou, scoring 170 goals in 324 appearances. He holds a UEFA A License and has served in various coaching roles including assistant head coach and analyst at OMONOIA 29ης Μαΐου, U16 head coach at MEAP Nisou, and academy head coach at Liverpool FC International Academy Cyprus.
