= Elena Aristodimou =

Cypriot footballer

Personal information
- Date of birth: 25 January 2002 (age 24)
- Place of birth: Cyprus
- Position: Midfielder

Team information
- Current team: FC Sion

Senior career*
Years	Team	Apps	(Gls)
2016–2019	Barcelona FA	56	(18)
2020–2021	Eskilstuna United		
2021	JyPK	22	(0)
2022–2023	Meppen II	2	(0)
2023	Aris Limassol	9	(1)
2023–2024	Medyk Konin	22	(2)
2024–	FC Sion	7	(2)

International career^{‡}
2018–2019	Cyprus U19	5	(0)
2020–	Cyprus	34	(4)
- * Club domestic league appearances and goals as of 2 November 2024 ‡ National team caps and goals as of 1 December 2025

Elena Aristodimou (born 25 January 2002) is a Cypriot footballer who plays as a midfielder for Swiss club FC Sion and the Cyprus national team.

== Career ==
Aristodimou has been capped for the Cyprus national team, appearing for the team during the UEFA Women's Euro 2021 qualifying cycle.

== International goals ==
No.	Date	Venue	Opponent	Score	Result	Competition
1.	6 April 2023	Junior Sport Stadium, Yerevan, Armenia	Armenia	3–0	6–0	Friendly
2.	22 September 2023	Dalga Arena, Baku, Azerbaijan	Azerbaijan	1–1	1–1	2023–24 UEFA Women's Nations League
3.	8 April 2025	Estadi Nacional, Andorra la Vella, Andorra	Andorra	1–0	1–2	2025 UEFA Women's Nations League
4.	28 November 2025	Dasaki Stadium, Achnas, Cyprus	Luxembourg	3–1	3–2	Friendly
