= Goran Petkovski =

Serbian footballer (born 1970)

Personal information
- Full name: Goran Petkovski
- Date of birth: 22 August 1970 (age 56)
- Place of birth: SFR Yugoslavia
- Position: Midfielder

Senior career*
Years	Team	Apps	(Gls)
1993–1996	Pontioi Veria		
1996–1998	Ethnikos Piraeus	36	(1)
1998–2000	Olympiakos Nicosia	44	(23)
2000–2002	AEK Larnaca	35	(10)
2002–2003	Enosis Neon Paralimni	19	(2)
2003–2004	APOEL	6	(1)

Managerial career
- 2014–2015: Olympiakos Nicosia
- * Club domestic league appearances and goals

Goran Petkovski (born 22 August 1970) is a retired footballer who played as a midfielder for clubs in Greece and Cyprus. He was manager of Olympiakos Nicosia between 2014 and August 2015.

== Club career ==
Early in his playing career, Petkovski moved to Greece where he would play for Greek second division side Pontioi Veria for 2.5 seasons. In January 1996, he joined Greek first division side Ethnikos Piraeus F.C., making 36 appearances in the Greek top flight.

In July 1998, Petkovski moved to Cyprus where he played for Olympiakos Nicosia, AEK Larnaca FC, Enosis Neon Paralimni FC and finished his career as a champion with APOEL FC in 2004.

== Managerial career ==
He started his managerial career at his first Cypriot club Olympiakos Nicosia in 2014.
