= Krystyna Freda =

Association football player (born 1993)

Personal information
- Full name: Krystyna Marie Freda
- Date of birth: 1 November 1993 (age 33)
- Place of birth: Somerset, New Jersey, United States
- Height: 1.70 m (5 ft 7 in)
- Position: Forward

Team information
- Current team: Apollon
- Number: 21

Youth career
- Franklin High School

College career
Years	Team	Apps	(Gls)
2011–2014	Winthrop Eagles	75	(63)

Senior career*
Years	Team	Apps	(Gls)
2015	Merilappi United	14	(10)
2016	New Jersey Copa	11	(15)
2017	Apollon	4	(14)
2017–2019	Barcelona FA	47	(138)
2019–2022	Apollon	52	(143)
2020	→ Glasgow City (loan)	0	(0)
2022	Hibernian	9	(4)
2023–	Apollon	58	(63)

International career^{‡}
2020–	Cyprus	19	(8)
- * Club domestic league appearances and goals as of 25 September 2026 ‡ National team caps and goals as of 19 April 2024 (UTC)

Krystyna Marie Freda (born 1 November 1993) is a footballer who plays as a forward. Born and raised in the United States, she represents Cyprus internationally.

== Early life ==
Freda was raised in the Somerset section of Franklin Township, Somerset County, New Jersey. She is of Polish descent through her grandparents.

== Personal life ==
Freda belongs to the LGBT community and she is an Athlete Ally pro ambassador.

== International goals ==
No.	Date	Venue	Opponent	Score	Result	Competition
1.	6 October 2022	GSZ Stadium, Larnaca, Cyprus	Liechtenstein	3–0	5–0	Friendly
2.	6 October 2022	GSZ Stadium, Larnaca, Cyprus	Liechtenstein	4–0	5–0	Friendly
3.	9 October 2022	GSZ Stadium, Larnaca, Cyprus	Liechtenstein	1–1	2–1	Friendly
4.	6 April 2023	Junior Sport Stadium, Yerevan, Armenia	Armenia	2–0	6–0	Friendly
5.	6 April 2023	Junior Sport Stadium, Yerevan, Armenia	Armenia	4–0	6–0	Friendly
6.	6 April 2023	Junior Sport Stadium, Yerevan, Armenia	Armenia	5–0	6–0	Friendly
7.	6 April 2023	Junior Sport Stadium, Yerevan, Armenia	Armenia	6–0	6–0	Friendly
8.	9 April 2023	Junior Sport Stadium, Yerevan, Armenia	Armenia	2–1	2–1	Friendly

== Career statistics ==
=== Club ===
Club	Season	Division	League		Cup		Continental		Total	
Club	Season	Division	Apps	Goals	Apps	Goals	Apps	Goals	Apps	Goals
Merilappi United	2015	Naisten Liiga	14	10					14	10
New Jersey Copa	2016	United Women's Soccer	11	15					11	15
Apollon ladies	2016–17	Cyprus Women's League	4	14	3	13			7	27
Apollon ladies	2019–20	Cyprus Women's League	17	59	2	7	3	5	23	71
Apollon ladies	2020–21	Cyprus Women's League	19	45	3	1	2	3	24	49
Apollon ladies	2021–22	Cyprus Women's League	16	39	7	8	4	3	27	50
Apollon ladies	2022–23	Cyprus Women's League	11	18	3	2			14	20
Apollon ladies	2023–24	Cyprus Women's League	17	16	4	10	1	0	22	26
Apollon ladies	2024–25	Cyprus Women's League	16	12	4	1	2	1	22	14
Apollon ladies	2025–26	Cyprus Women's League	14	17	4	0	2	0	20	17
Apollon ladies	2026-27	Cyprus Women's League					1	1	1	1
Apollon ladies	Total		114	220	30	42	15	13	159	275
Barcelona	2017–18	Cyprus Women's league	18	61	4	8			22	69
Barcelona	2018–19	Cyprus Women's league	29	77	4	6	5	7	38	90
Barcelona	Total		47	138	8	14	5	7	60	159
Glasgow City	2020–21	Scottish Women's Premier League					1	0	1	0
Hibernian Women	2022–23	Scottish Women's Premier League	9	4	2	3			11	7
Total career			195	387	40	59	21	20	256	466
