= 2020–21 Cypriot First Division (women) =

Cypriot First Division Women
- Season: 2020–21
- Champions: Apollon Limassol (11th title)

The 2020–21 Cypriot First Division Women is the twenty-fourth season if the top-flight women's football league in Cyprus. Apollon Ladies F.C. are the defending champions.

The season began on 13 September 2020.

== Teams ==
- Apollon Ladies F.C.
- Nea Salamina Famagusta
- Omonia Nicosia
- Lefkothea Nicosia
- Ypsona Limassol
- Karmiotissa Chrysomilia
- Geroskipou F.C. Ladies
- Ethnikos Achnas Ladies F.C.
- Ermis Apollon

== League table ==
Pos	Team	Pld	W	D	L	GF	GA	GD	Pts	Qualification or relegation
1	Apollon Ladies F.C. (Q)	10	10	0	0	52	1	+51	30	Qualification to championship playoffs
2	Omonia Nicosia	11	8	1	2	27	13	+14	25	Qualification to championship playoffs
3	Nea Salamina Famagusta	10	7	1	2	35	10	+25	22	Qualification to championship playoffs
4	Lefkothea Nicosia	10	7	0	3	47	8	+39	21	Qualification to championship playoffs
5	Geroskipou F.C. Ladies	11	5	0	6	13	31	−18	15	Qualification to championship playoffs
6	Ypsona Limassol	11	4	1	6	27	29	−2	13	Qualification to relegation playoffs
7	Karmiotissa Chrysomilia	11	3	1	7	15	29	−14	10	Qualification to relegation playoffs
8	Ermis Apollon	10	1	0	9	11	55	−44	3	Qualification to relegation playoffs
9	Ethnikos Achnas Ladies F.C.	11	0	0	11	3	51	−48	0	Qualification to relegation playoffs

Updated to match(es) played on 1 December 2020. Source: Women's Soccerway
Rules for classification: 1) Points; 2) Goal difference; 3) Number of goals scored;
(Q) Qualified for the phase indicated
