= Cyprus women's national football team =

Women's national association football team representing Cyprus

Cyprus
- Association: Cyprus Football Association
- Confederation: UEFA (Europe)
- Head coach: Savvas Sofokleous
- Home stadium: Makario Stadium, Nicosia
- FIFA code: CYP
First colours	Second colours

FIFA ranking
- Current: 137 ▼2 (20 October 2026)
- Highest: 93 (December 2017)
- Lowest: 133 (August – December 2024; August 2025)

First international
- Cyprus 2–4 Greece (Paralimni, Cyprus; 25 April 2002)

Biggest win
- Cyprus 7–1 Bahrain (Parekklisia, Cyprus; 15 March 2017); Armenia 0–6 Cyprus (Yerevan, Armenia; 6 April 2023)

Biggest defeat
- Netherlands 12–0 Cyprus (Groningen, Netherlands; 8 April 2022)

The Cyprus women's national football team represents Cyprus in international women's football competitions.

== Team image ==
=== Home stadium ===
The Cyprus women's national football team plays their home matches on the Makario Stadium.

== Results and fixtures ==
- The following is a list of match results in the last 12 months, as well as any future matches that have been scheduled.

Legend

Win Draw Lose Fixture

=== 2025 ===
28 November Friendly	Cyprus	3–2	Luxembourg	Achnas, Cyprus
14:00	Michail 53'; McBeth 62'; Aristodimou 80'	Report	Thompson 58'; Kirps 83'	Stadium: Dasaki Stadium; Referee: Mari Toumazou (Cyprus)

1 December Friendly	Cyprus	0–3	Luxembourg	Achnas, Cyprus
		Report	Cusick 4' (o.g.); Dietrich 24'; Dos Santos 45'	Stadium: Dasaki Stadium

=== 2026 ===
2 March 2026 Friendly	Cyprus	1–1	Faroe Islands	Cyprus
	Hardy 13'	Report	Brændstrup 73'

7 March 2026 2027 FIFA World Cup qualification - UEFA League C5	Cyprus	0–4	Romania	Achna, Cyprus
14:00		Report	Bălăceanu 12', 74'; Ciolacu 40' (pen.); Vlădulescu 58'	Stadium: Dasaki Stadium; Attendance: 350; Referee: Eszter Urban (Hungary)

14 April 2026 2027 FIFA World Cup qualification - UEFA League C5	Moldova	0–0	Cyprus	Nisporeni, Moldova
17:00		Report		Stadium: Stadionul Central Nisporeni; Attendance: 305; Referee: Natálie Čampišová (Czech Republic)

18 April 2026 2027 FIFA World Cup qualification - UEFA League C5	Romania	3–0	Cyprus	Bucharest, Romania
16:00	Vlădulescu 5'; I. Stancu 85'; Ciolacu 90+1'	Report		Stadium: Arcul de Triumf; Attendance: 772; Referee: Nadine Reichmuth (Switzerland)

9 June 2026 2027 FIFA World Cup qualification - UEFA League C5	Cyprus	0–2	Moldova	Larnaca, Cyprus
20:00		Report	Țabur 62'; Colesnicenco 86'	Stadium: Antonis Papadopoulos Stadium; Referee: Charlotte Carpenter (Wales)

27 November 2026 Friendly	Cyprus	v	Luxembourg	Dasaki Achnas, Cyprus
				Stadium: Dasaki Stadium

30 November 2026 Friendly	Cyprus	v	Luxembourg	Dasaki Achnas, Cyprus
				Stadium: Dasaki Stadium

=== 2027 ===
2 March 2027 UEFA Women's Nations League C	Cyprus	v	Moldova	Cyprus
		Report

6 March 2027 UEFA Women's Nations League C	Cyprus	v	Malta	Cyprus
		Report

24 April 2027 UEFA Women's Nations League C	Malta	v	Cyprus	Malta
		Report

11 June 2027 UEFA Women's Nations League C	Moldova	v	Cyprus	Moldova
		Report

=== 2027 FIFA World Cup qualification ===
==== Group C5 ====
Pos	Team	Pld	W	D	L	GF	GA	GD	Pts	Promotion or qualification
1	Romania (P)	4	3	1	0	8	0	+8	10	Advance to play-offs and promotion to League B
2	Moldova	4	1	2	1	2	1	+1	5	
3	Cyprus	4	0	1	3	0	9	−9	1	

Source: UEFA
Rules for classification: Tiebreakers
(P) Promoted

== Coaching staff ==
=== Current coaching staff ===
Position	Name	Ref.
Head coach	Savvas Sofokleous	

=== Manager history ===
- Aggelos Tsolakis (????–???)
- Stefanos Voskarides(????–present)

== Players ==
Caps and goals may be incorrect.

=== Current squad ===
- The following players were called up for friendly matches against Luxembourg on 27 and 30 November 2026 at Ethnikos Achnas Stadium.

No.	Pos.	Player	Date of birth (age)	Caps	Goals	Club
1	GK	Maria Matthaiou	26 April 1997 (age 29)	41	0	(Football Association of Ireland) Athlone Town
22	GK	Constantina Kouzali	2 December 1995 (age 30)	3	0	(Cyprus Football Association) Omonia
	GK	Ioanna Hanny	6 November 2006 (age 20)	0	0	(Cyprus Football Association) Xylofagou
2	DF	Chara Charalambous	24 March 2000 (age 26)	31	0	(Cyprus Football Association) Omonia
3	DF	Chryso Michael	12 September 2001 (age 25)	24	1	(Hellenic Football Federation) Asteras Tripolis
4	DF	Andrea Cusick	21 December 2006 (age 19)	16	0	(Cyprus Football Association) Peyia Akamas
5	DF	Efthalia Siakalli	27 June 2003 (age 23)	33	0	(Cyprus Football Association) Omonia
17	DF	Marilena Georgiou	19 June 1996 (age 30)	38	0	(Cyprus Football Association) Apollon
23	DF	Christina Kyriakidi	6 November 2005 (age 21)	11	0	(Cyprus Football Association) Aris Limassol
	DF	Andria Efstratiou	26 January 2005 (age 21)	7	0	(Romanian Football Federation) Csíkszereda
	DF	Korina Paola Adamou	6 July 2002 (age 24)	8	0	(Cyprus Football Association) Apollon
7	MF	Maria Panagiotou	5 February 2005 (age 21)	28	1	(Hellenic Football Federation) Asteras Tripolis
8	MF	Filippa Savva	28 May 1999 (age 27)	47	1	(Cyprus Football Association) Apollon
10	MF	Eirini Michail	12 July 2002 (age 24)	29	2	(Hellenic Football Federation) PAOK
11	MF	Loucretia Chrysostomou	10 October 1992 (age 34)	38	3	(Cyprus Football Association) Peyia Akamas
13	MF	Sophia McBeth	15 September 2006 (age 20)	7	1	(Cyprus Football Association) Peyia Akamas
	MF	Elena Aristodimou	25 January 2002 (age 24)	39	4	(Cyprus Football Association) Apollon
	MF	Eleni Giannou	16 September 1993 (age 33)	19	0	(Cyprus Football Association) Apollon
	MF	Domna Stylianou	14 February 2004 (age 22)	0	0	(Cyprus Football Association) Aris Limassol
	MF	Maria Zamani	17 January 2005 (age 21)	2	0	(Cyprus Football Association) Omonia
9	FW	Antri Violari (captain)	27 September 1996 (age 30)	43	12	(Hellenic Football Federation) AEK
14	FW	Anna Matsoukari	28 January 2007 (age 19)	6	1	(Cyprus Football Association) Omonia
	FW	Krystyna Freda	1 November 1993 (age 33)	15	4	(Cyprus Football Association) Apollon

=== Recent call ups ===
- The following players have been called up to a Cyprus squad in the past 12 months.

Pos.	Player	Date of birth (age)	Caps	Goals	Club	Latest call-up
GK	Galini Zachariou	22 August 2004 (age 22)	0	0	(Croatia) ŽNK Agram	v.Moldova, 9 June 2026
DF	Steffi Hardy	29 June 1996 (age 30)	14	2	(Cyprus) Apollon	v.Moldova, 9 June 2026
DF	Chrisilia Angeli	27 April 2010 (age 16)	0	0	(Cyprus) Omonia	v.Moldova, 9 June 2026
DF	Sara Papadopoulou^{RET}	16 October 1987 (age 39)	38	0	(Cyprus) Omonia	v.Moldova, 9 June 2026
DF	Styliana Aspraki	22 October 2009 (age 17)	1	0	(Cyprus) Olympiakos Nicosia	v.Luxembourg, 1 December 2025
DF	Sotiria Polydorou	3 July 2005 (age 21)	1	0	(Cyprus) Lakatamia	v.Luxembourg, 1 December 2025
MF	Maria Astaniou	18 April 2002 (age 24)	7	0	(Cyprus) Omonia	v.Moldova, 9 June 2026
MF	Adrianna Tsoukka	15 June 2007 (age 19)	5	0	(Cyprus) Apollon	v.Moldova, 9 June 2026
MF	Eleftheria Poulli	1 December 2010 (age 15)	0	0	(Cyprus) Peyia Akamas	v.Moldova, 9 June 2026
MF	Mariam Simeou	13 December 2010 (age 15)	0	0	(Cyprus) Omonia	v.Romania, 7 March 2026
MF	Sophie Dionissiou	17 March 2005 (age 21)	6	0	(England) Loughborough Lightning	v.Romania, 7 March 2026
FW	Adriana Christofi	4 August 2009 (age 17)	3	0	(Cyprus) Peyia Akamas	v.Moldova, 9 June 2026
FW	Marilia Constantinou	20 July 2006 (age 20)	10	1	(Cyprus) Apollon	v.Moldova, 9 June 2026
FW	Natalia Solonos	30 May 2009 (age 17)	1	0	(Cyprus) Omonia	v.Moldova, 9 June 2026

== Records ==
- Active players in **bold**, statistics correct as of 2020.

=== Most capped players ===
#	Player	Year(s)	Caps

=== Top goalscorers ===
#	Player	Year(s)	Goals	Caps

== Competitive record ==
=== FIFA Women's World Cup ===
FIFA Women's World Cup record									Qualification record								
Year	Result	P	W	D*	L	GF	GA	GD	P	W	D*	L	GF	GA	GD	P/R	Rnk
(China) 1991	Did not enter								Did not enter								
(Sweden) 1995	Did not enter								Did not enter								
(United States) 1999	Did not enter								Did not enter								
(United States) 2003	Did not enter								Did not enter								
(China) 2007	Did not enter								Did not enter								
(Germany) 2011	Did not enter								Did not enter								
(Canada) 2015	Did not enter								Did not enter								
(France) 2019	Did not enter								Did not enter								
(Australia) (New Zealand) 2023	Did not qualify								8	0	1	7	2	48	−46	–	
(Brazil) 2027	To be determined								To be determined								
(Costa Rica) (Jamaica) (Mexico) (United States) 2031	To be determined								To be determined								
(United Kingdom) 2035	To be determined								To be determined								
Total	0/12	-	-	-	-	-	-	-	8	0	1	7	2	48	−46	–	

*Draws include knockout matches decided on penalty kicks.

=== UEFA Women's Championship ===
UEFA Women's Championship record									Qualifying record								
Year	Result	P	W	D*	L	GF	GA	GD	P	W	D*	L	GF	GA	GD	P/R	Rnk
(England) (Sweden) 1984 to (Germany) 2001	Did not exist								Did not exist								
(England) 2005	Did not enter								Did not enter								
(Finland) 2009	Did not enter								Did not enter								
(Sweden) 2013	Did not enter								Did not enter								
(Netherlands) 2017	Did not enter								Did not enter								
(England) 2022	Did not qualify								8	0	0	8	0	37	−37	–	
(Switzerland) 2025	Did not qualify								6	0	0	6	1	14	−13	Same position	50th
2029	To be determined								To be determined								
Total	0/6	-	-	-	-	-	-	-	14	0	0	14	1	51	−50	50th	

*Draws include knockout matches decided on penalty kicks.

=== UEFA Women's Nations League ===
UEFA Women's Nations League record
Year	League	Group	Pos	Pld	W	D	L	GF	GA	P/R	Rnk
2023–24	C	3	3rd	6	2	1	3	3	6	Same position	46th
2025	C	2	To be determined								
Total				6	2	1	3	3	6	46th	

== See also ==
- Sport in Cyprus
  - Football in Cyprus
    - Women's football in Cyprus
- Cyprus women's national under-20 football team
- Cyprus women's national under-19 football team
- Cyprus women's national under-17 football team
- Cyprus men's national football team
