= Cypriot Women's Super Cup =

- Organiser(s): Cyprus Football Association
- Founded: 2007; 19 years ago
- Region: Cyprus
- Teams: 2
- Current champions: Apollon ladies (11th title)
- Most championships: Apollon ladies (11 titles)
- Website: www.cfa.com.cy

The Cypriot Women's Super Cup is the women's football super cup competition in Cyprus. It is played between the winner of the Cypriot Women's Cup and the Cypriot First Division champion. If a team wins the double (the Championship and the Cup in the same season), then this team plays the runners-up of the Cypriot Women's Cup.

== Cypriot Super Cup Finals ==
The table below lists all finals of the Super Cup each year:

Key to list of winners
*	Match went to extra time
†	Match decided via a penalty shoot-out after extra time
‡	Winning team won the Domestic Double (Women's League title and Women's Cypriot Cup) the previous season
	Winning team won the League title the previous season
	Winning team won the Cup the previous season
(#)	Number of trophy won by club

Year	Winner	Score	Runner-up
2007	Nea Salamina (1)	2–1	AEK Konstantias
2008	Not held		
2009	Apollon Ladies ‡ (1)	4–1	Lefkothea Latsion
2010	Apollon Ladies ‡ (2)	7–0	Lefkothea Latsion
2011	Apollon Ladies ‡ (3)	3–0	AEK Konstantias
2012	Not held		
2013	Apollon Ladies ‡ (4)	4–1	Lefkothea Latsion
2014	Apollon Ladies ‡ (5)	9–0	Lefkothea Latsion
2015	Apollon Ladies ‡ (6)	6–1	Lefkothea Latsion
2016	Not held		
2017	Apollon Ladies ‡ (7)	1–1 † (Note: Score was 1–1 after extra time. Apollon Ladies won the penalty shoot-out 3–0.)	Barcelona FA
2018	Barcelona FA (1)	1–0	Apollon Ladies
2019	Not held		
2020	Not held		
2021	Apollon Ladies (8)	5–0	AC Omonia
2022	Not held		
2023	Apollon Ladies ‡ (9)	4–0	AC Omonia
2024	Apollon Ladies ‡ (10)	4–0	Lefkothea Latsion
2025	AC Omonia (1)	2–0	Apollon Ladies
2026	Apollon Ladies ‡ (11)	5–0	Aris

Notes

- AEK Kokkinochorion is renamed AEK Konstantias in 2009.

== Performance by club ==
Club	Winners	Runners-up	Winning years
Apollon Ladies	11	2	2009, 2010, 2011, 2013, 2014, 2015, 2017, 2021, 2023, 2024, 2026
AC Omonoia	1	2	2025
Barcelona FA	1	1	2018
Nea Salamina	1	–	2007
Lefkothea Latsion	–	6	
AEK Konstantias	–	2	
Aris	–	1	

Notes

- AEK Kokkinochorion is renamed AEK Konstantias in 2009.
