= Barcelona FA =

Coordinates: 34.746113°N 33.188830°E

- Full name: Σωματειο Μπαρτσελόνα Ποδοσφαίρου Ακαδημία; Somateio Barcelona Podosfaírou Akadimía
- Founded: 2016; 10 years ago
- Ground: Pyrgos Stadium; Pyrgos, Limassol
- Head coach: Eduard "Xuxu" Batlle
- League: Cypriot First Division
- 2018–19: 2nd
- Website: https://www.barcelonafawomen.com/
Home colours	Away colours

Barcelona Football Academy (Greek: Σωματειο Μπαρτσελόνα Ποδοσφαίρου Ακαδημία; Somateio Barcelona Podosfaírou Akadimía) is a women's football team from Germasogeia, Limassol, Cyprus, established in 2016.

They were crowned champions of the 2017–18 Cypriot First Division, and made their European debut in the 2018–19 UEFA Women's Champions League.

For major matches, they play at Limassol's main Tsirio Stadium.

== European record ==
Season	Competition	Round	Opposition	Score		
Season	Competition	Round	Opposition	First Leg	Second Leg	Aggregate
2018–19	UEFA Women's Champions League	Qualifying Round	(Slovakia) Slovan Bratislava	2–0		1st
2018–19	UEFA Women's Champions League	Qualifying Round	(Slovenia) Olimpija Ljubljana	6–0		1st
2018–19	UEFA Women's Champions League	Qualifying Round	(Belarus) FC Minsk	2–0		1st
2018–19	UEFA Women's Champions League	Round of 32	(Scotland) Glasgow City	0–2	1–0	1–2
