= Cypriot Women's Cup =

- Organiser(s): Cyprus Football Association
- Founded: 1998; 28 years ago
- Region: Cyprus
- Current champions: Apollon Ladies (15th title)
- Most championships: Apollon Ladies (15 titles)
- Website: cfacup.com.cy
- 2026–27

The Cypriot Women's Cup is the national women's football cup competition in Cyprus. The cup was first held in 1998/99. No editions organised by the Cyprus Football Association were played from 2000 to 2002 and 2004 to 2005.

== Cypriot Women's Cup Finals ==
The table below lists the teams that participated in the final of the cup each season.

Key to list of winners
*	Match went to extra time
†	Match decided via a penalty shoot-out after extra time
‡	Winning team won the Domestic Double (Women's League title and Women's Cypriot Cup)
(#)	Number of trophy won by club

Season	Winner	Result	Runner-up
1998–99	Lefkothea Latsion ‡ (1)	3-1	La Bella Limassol
1999–00	Not held		
2000–01	Not held		
2001–02	Not held		
2002–03	Pafia Pafou (1)	2–0	Ledra Nicosia
2003–04	Ledra Nicosia ‡(1)	3-2	AEK Konstantias
2004-05	Not held		
2005–06	AEK Konstantias ‡ (1)	3-1	Ledra Nicosia
2006–07	AEK Konstantias ‡ (2)	3-1	Nea Salamina
2007–08	Vamos Idalion ‡ (1)	2-0	Pafia Pafou
2008–09	Apollon Ladies ‡ (1)	5–2	Lefkothea Latsion
2009–10	Apollon Ladies ‡ (2)	4–0	Lefkothea Latsion
2010–11	Apollon Ladies ‡ (3)	6–3	AEK Konstantias
2011–12	Apollon Ladies ‡ (4)	6–0	Pafia Pafou
2012–13	Apollon Ladies ‡ (5)	2–1	Lefkothea Latsion
2013–14	Apollon Ladies ‡ (6)	2–1	Lefkothea Latsion
2014–15	Apollon Ladies ‡ (7)	3–0	Lefkothea Latsion

2015–16	Apollon Ladies ‡ (8)	5–1	Lefkothea Latsion
2016–17	Apollon Ladies ‡ (9)	5–0	Barcelona FA Limassol
2017–18	Apollon Ladies (10)	2–2 † (Note: Score was 2–2 after extra time. Apollon Ladies won the penalty shoot-out 6–7.)	Barcelona FA Limassol
Season	Winner	Score	Runner-up
2018–19	Barcelona FA Limassol (1)	4–0	AC Omonia
2019–20	Abandoned due to COVID-19 pandemic		
2020–21	AC Omonia (1)	0–0 † (Note: Score was 0–0 after extra time. AC Omonia won the penalty shoot-out 4–3.)	Apollon Ladies
2021–22	Apollon Ladies ‡ (11)	2–0	Nea Salamina
2022–23	Apollon Ladies ‡ (12)	1–0	AC Omonia
2023–24	Apollon Ladies ‡ (13)	3–0	Lefkothea Latsion
2024–25	Apollon Ladies ‡ (14)	2–1	AC Omonia
2025–26	Apollon Ladies ‡ (15)	2–1	Aris Limassol

Notes:

- AEK Kokkinochorion is renamed AEK Konstantias in 2009.

== Performance by club ==
Club	Winners	Runners-up	Winning Seasons
Apollon Ladies	15	1	2008–09, 2009–10, 2010–11, 2011–12, 2012–13, 2013–14, 2014–15, 2015–16, 2016–17, 2017–18, 2021–22, 2022–23, 2023–24, 2024–25, 2025–26
AEK Konstantias	2	2	2005–06, 2006–07
Lefkothea Latsion	1	7	1998–99
AC Omonia	1	3	2020–21
Pafia Pafou	1	2	2002–03
Ledra Nicosia	1	2	2003–04
Barcelona FA Limassol	1	2	2018–19
Vamos Idaliou	1	–	2007–08
Nea Salamina	–	2	
La Bella Limassol	–	1	
Aris Limassol	–	1	

Notes

- AEK Kokkinochorion is renamed AEK Konstantias in 2009.

== See also ==
- Cypriot Women's Super Cup
- Cypriot Cup, men's edition
