= Apollon Ladies F.C. =

Women's football club based in Limassol, Cyprus

Apollon Ladies
- Full name: Apollon Ladies FC
- Founded: 2007; 19 years ago
- Ground: Parekklisia Community Stadium
- Capacity: 3,000
- Chairman: Andreas Marangos
- Manager: Angelos Tsolakis
- League: First Division
- 2025–26: First Division, 1st
Home colours	Away colours

Apollon Ladies FC is a women's professional football team from Limassol, Cyprus, established in 2007. It is the leading club in the country, having won nine consecutive doubles. It is associated with men's side Apollon Limassol.

Apollon made headlines after beating two-times European champion Umeå IK in their second appearance in the Champions League. This is regarded as one of the biggest surprises in European women's football. Apollon reached the Round of 32, where it was knocked out by Zvezda Perm. Apollon again progressed past the qualifying stage in the 2011–12, 2012–13 and the 2013–14 season.

== Current squad ==
As of 8 October 2026.

Note: Flags indicate national team as defined under FIFA eligibility rules; some limited exceptions apply. Players may hold more than one non-FIFA nationality.

No.	Pos.	Nation	Player
2	DF	USA	Mallory Mooney
3	FW	USA	Mackenzie Geigle
4	FW	USA	Maya Matesa
5	MF	USA	Shannon Studer
6	DF	CYP	Steffi Hardy (captain)
7	MF	CYP	Eleni Giannou
8	MF	CYP	Filippa Savva
9	MF	CYP	Antriana Tsoukka
10	MF	USA	Lainey Higgins
11	FW	ENG	Tash Hudson
12	GK	CYP	Mikaella Hadjisavva

No.	Pos.	Nation	Player
13	MF	CYP	Elena Aristodimou
15	DF	USA	Olivia Pearse
16	DF	CYP	Elena Michail
17	DF	CYP	Marilena Georgiou
18	FW	GHA	Mariam Yunus
19	FW	CYP	Marilia Constantinou
21	FW	CYP	Krystyna Freda
27	FW	CYP	Charalampia Epaminonda
28	GK	CYP	Antriana Mila
30	DF	CYP	Korina Paola Adamou
33	DF	ROU	Maria Ficzay
45	DF	CYP	Panagiota Fotiou
77	MF	AUT	Jelena Prvulović

== Notable players ==
=== Former internationals ===
For details of current and former players, see Category:Apollon Ladies F.C. players.

- Cyprus: Skevi Antoniou, Stavriana Antoniou, Mandalena Christou, Loucretia Chrysostomou, Marilena Georgiou, Eleni Giannou, Maria Ioannou, Antria Michail, Sophia Nearchou, Margarita Sofocleous, Christiana Solomou, Antri Violari, Victoria Zampa
- Bulgaria: Liliana Kostova, Petya Petkova
- England: Lianne Sanderson
- Greece: Danai-Eleni Sidira
- India: Manisha Kalyan
- Jamaica: Tiffany Cameron
- Mexico: Cecilia Santiago
- Netherlands: Marije Brummel
- Poland: Nikki Krzysik
- Portugal: Mónica Mendes
- Romania: Cristina Costa, Teodora Drăgoescu, Mirela Ganea, Olga Iordachiusi, Alexandra Iusan, Eniko Kadar, Andreea Laiu, Corina Olar, Laura Rus, Florentina Spanu, Ana Maria Stanciu
- Russia: Yekaterina Gokhman
- Scotland: Frankie Brown, Ifeoma Dieke, Hayley Lauder
- Uganda: Juliet Nalukenge
- United States: Danesha Adams, Yael Averbuch, Joanna Lohman, Tina DiMartino

=== Former non-international professional players ===
- (United States) Michelle Betos, Taylor Comeau, Michelle Cruz, Gina DiMartino, Sinead Farrelly, Haley Kopmeyer, Julia Lester, Ashley Nick, Paige Nielsen, Mollie Pathman, Hanna Terry, Amanda Visco, Zaneta Wyne

== UEFA Competitions History ==
Season	Competition	Stage	Result	Opponent
2009–10	Champions League	Qualifying Stage	4–0	(Israel) Maccabi Holon
2009–10	Champions League	Qualifying Stage	0–1	(Russia) Rossiyanka
2009–10	Champions League	Qualifying Stage	2–0	(Republic of Ireland) St. Francis
2010–11	Champions League	Qualifying Stage	6–1	(Bosnia and Herzegovina) Sarajevo
2010–11	Champions League	Qualifying Stage	4–1	(Sweden) Umeå
2010–11	Champions League	Qualifying Stage	3–0	(Israel) ASA Tel Aviv
2010–11	Champions League	Round of 32	1–2 (H), 1–2 (A)	(Russia) Zvezda Perm
2011–12	Champions League	Qualifying Stage	14–0	(Luxembourg) Progrès Niedercorn
2011–12	Champions League	Qualifying Stage	8–0	(Wales) Swansea City
2011–12	Champions League	Qualifying Stage	2–1	(Ukraine) Lehenda Chernihiv
2011–12	Champions League	Round of 32	2–2 (H), 1–2 (A)	(Czech Republic) Sparta Praha
2012–13	Champions League	Qualifying Stage	7–0	(Faroe Islands) Klaksvík
2012–13	Champions League	Qualifying Stage	21–0	(Albania) Velipojë
2012–13	Champions League	Qualifying Stage	3–0	(Ukraine) Kharkiv
2012–13	Champions League	Round of 32	2–3 (H), 1–3 (A)	(Italy) Torres
2013–14	Champions League	Qualifying Stage	2–0	(Slovakia) Nové Zámky
2013–14	Champions League	Qualifying Stage	1–0	(Moldova) Goliador Chişinău
2013–14	Champions League	Qualifying Stage	3–0	(Israel) ASA Tel Aviv
2013–14	Champions League	Round of 32	1–2 (H), 1–1 (A)	(Austria) Neulengbach
2014–15	Champions League	Qualifying Stage	3–1	(Lithuania) Gintra Universitetas
2014–15	Champions League	Qualifying Stage	0–0	(Albania) KF Vllaznia Shkodër
2014–15	Champions League	Qualifying Stage	3–1	(Faroe Islands) KÍ Klaksvík
2014–15	Champions League	Round of 32	1–0 (H), 1–3 (a.e.t.) (A)	(Denmark) Brøndby IF
2015–16	Champions League	Qualifying Stage	2–0	(Faroe Islands) KÍ Klaksvík
2015–16	Champions League	Qualifying Stage	8–0	(Malta) Hibernians
2015–16	Champions League	Qualifying Stage	0–2	(Iceland) Stjarnan
2016–17	Champions League	Qualifying Stage	5–0	(Faroe Islands) KÍ Klaksvík
2016–17	Champions League	Qualifying Stage	1–0	(Kosovo) Hajvalia
2016–17	Champions League	Qualifying Stage	3–3	(Greece) PAOK
2016–17	Champions League	Round of 32	1–1 (H), 2–3 (A)	(Czech Republic) Slavia Praha
2017–18	Champions League	Qualifying Stage	4–0	(Bulgaria) NSA Sofia
2017–18	Champions League	Qualifying Stage	6–0	(Moldova) Noroc Nimoreni
2017–18	Champions League	Qualifying Stage	4–1	(Austria) Sturm Graz
2017–18	Champions League	Round of 32	0–1 (H), 0–3 (A)	(Sweden) Linköping
2019–20	Champions League	Qualifying Stage	10–0	(Latvia) Rīgas FS
2019–20	Champions League	Qualifying Stage	0–1	(Portugal) Braga
2019–20	Champions League	Qualifying Stage	7–2	(Austria) Sturm Graz
2020–21	Champions League	1QR	3–0	(Wales) Swansea City
2020–21	Champions League	2QR	1–2	(Poland) Górnik Łęczna
2021–22	Champions League	1QR	2–0 (a.e.t.)	(Belarus) Dinamo-BGU Minsk
2021–22	Champions League	1QR	2–1	(Russia) CSKA Moscow
2021–22	Champions League	2QR	1–2 (H), 1–3 (A)	(Ukraine) Zhytlobud-1 Kharkiv
2022–23	Champions League	1QR	3–0	(Latvia) Rīgas FS
2022–23	Champions League	1QR	0–1	(Switzerland) Zürich
2023–24	Champions League	1QR	9–0	(North Macedonia) Ljuboten
2023–24	Champions League	1QR	3–0	(Georgia (country)) Samegrelo
2023–24	Champions League	2QR	0–7 (H), 0–4 (A)	(Portugal) Benfica
2024–25	Champions League	1QR	3–0	(Armenia) FC Pyunik
2024–25	Champions League	1QR	2–3	(Slovenia) ŽNK Mura

== Honours ==
- Cypriot First Division
  - Champions (16): 2008–09, 2009–10, 2010–11, 2011–12, 2012–13, 2013–14, 2014–15, 2015–16, 2016–17, 2018–19, 2020–21, 2021–22, 2022–23, 2023–24, 2024–25, 2025–26
- Cypriot Cup
  - Winners (15): 2008–09, 2009–10, 2010–11, 2011–12, 2012–13, 2013–14, 2014–15, 2015–16, 2016–17, 2017–18, 2021–22, 2022–23, 2023–24, 2024–25, 2025–26
- Cypriot Super Cup
  - Winners (10): 2009, 2010, 2011, 2013, 2014, 2015, 2017, 2021, 2023, 2024
