= Cypriot First Division (women) =

- Organising body: Cyprus Football Association
- Founded: 1998; 28 years ago
- Country: Cyprus
- Confederation: UEFA
- Number of clubs: 7 (2026-27)
- Level on pyramid: 1
- Domestic cups: Cypriot Women's Cup; Cypriot Women's Super Cup
- International cup: UEFA Women's Champions League
- Current champions: Apollon Ladies (16th title) (2025–26)
- Most championships: Apollon Ladies (16 titles)
- Top scorer: Krystyna Freda (358 goals)
- Website: www.cfa.com.cy
- Current: 2026–27 Cypriot First Division (women)

The Cypriot First Division is the top division of women's football in Cyprus. It has been running since its establishment by the Cyprus Football Association (C.F.A) and its originator Tassos Katsikidis (vice-president of the board) during the 1998–99 season.

The winning team of the league qualifies for a spot in the UEFA Women's Champions League. Although a Cypriot team entered the Champions League every year from 2003–04 onwards, in 2008–09 Apollon Limassol became the first team to win a point in those competitions. There is no second league in Cyprus as of 2014, thus there is no relegation in place.

== Current format ==
Each club plays the other sides twice, for a total of 18 games for each club. In the second round the teams ranked 1st to 5th play off for the title, and teams finishing 6th to 10th play each other. Teams receive three points for a win and one point for a draw. The league champions qualify for the UEFA Women's Champions League.

== Champions ==
The table presents all the winners since the 1998–99 season, when the competition officially began.

Key to list of winners
‡	Winning team won the Domestic Double (Women's League title and Women's Cypriot Cup)
(#)	Number of trophy won by club

Season	Winner
1998–99	Lefkothea Latsion ‡ (1)
1999–00	AEK Konstantias (1)
2000–01	AEK Konstantias (2)
2001–02	Lefkothea Latsion (2)
2002–03	Ledra Nicosia (1)
2003–04	Ledra Nicosia ‡ (2)
2004–05	AEK Konstantias (3)
2005–06	AEK Konstantias ‡ (4)
2006–07	AEK Konstantias ‡ (5)
2007–08	Vamos Idaliou ‡ (1)
2008–09	Apollon Ladies ‡ (1)
2009–10	Apollon Ladies ‡ (2)
2010–11	Apollon Ladies ‡ (3)

Season	Winner
2011–12	Apollon Ladies ‡ (4)
2012–13	Apollon Ladies ‡ (5)
2013–14	Apollon Ladies ‡ (6)
2014–15	Apollon Ladies ‡ (7)
2015–16	Apollon Ladies ‡ (8)
2016–17	Apollon Ladies ‡ (9)
2017–18	Barcelona FA (1)
2018–19	Apollon Ladies (10)
2019–20	Abandoned due to COVID-19
2020–21	Apollon Ladies (11)
2021–22	Apollon Ladies ‡ (12)
2022–23	Apollon Ladies ‡ (13)
2023–24	Apollon Ladies ‡ (14)
2024–25	Apollon Ladies ‡ (15)
2025–26	Apollon Ladies ‡ (16)

Notes:

- AEK Kokkinochorion is renamed AEK Konstantias in 2009.

== Performance by club ==
Club	Winners	Winning seasons
Apollon Ladies	16	2008–09, 2009–10, 2010–11, 2011–12, 2012–13, 2013–14, 2014–15, 2015–16, 2016–17, 2018–19, 2020–21, 2021–22, 2022–23, 2023–24, 2024–25, 2025–26
AEK Konstantias	5	1999–00, 2000–01, 2004–05, 2005–06, 2006–07
Lefkothea Latsion	2	1998–99, 2001–02
Ledra Nicosia	2	2002–03, 2003–04
Vamos Idaliou	1	2007–08
Barcelona FA	1	2017–18

Notes:

- AEK Kokkinochorion is renamed AEK Konstantias in 2009.

== Top goalscorers ==
Season	Player	Team	Goals
2008–09	(Cyprus) Skevi Antoniou	Nea Salamina	64
2009–10	(Bulgaria) Liliana Kostova	Apollon	27
2010–11	(Bulgaria) Liliana Kostova	Apollon	30
2011–12	(Romania) Alexandra Iusan	Apollon	13
2011–12	(Bulgaria) Liliana Kostova	Apollon	13
2012–13	(Romania) Laura Rus	Apollon	21
2013–14	(Cyprus) Marilena Georgiou	Apollon	14
2014–15	(Sweden) Maria Johansson	A.E. Ammochostou	40
2015–16	(Cyprus) Antri Violari	Apollon	43
2016-17	(Canada) Meagan Kelly	Apollon	24
2017–18	(Cyprus) Krystyna Freda	Barcelona	61
2018–19	(Cyprus) Krystyna Freda	Barcelona	77
2019–20	(Cyprus) Krystyna Freda	Apollon	59
2020–21	(Cyprus) Krystyna Freda	Apollon	45
2021–22	(Cyprus) Krystyna Freda	Apollon	39
2022-23	(Sweden) Emelie Helmvall	Apollon	37
2023–24	(Ghana) Elshaddai Acheampong	Apollon	19
2024-25	(Cyprus) Krystyna Freda	Apollon	12
2025–26	(Poland) Kinga Ejzel	Aris Limassol	21

Most time goalscorers

- 6 times
  - Krystyna Freda (2017-18, 2018-19, 2019-20, 2020-21, 2021-22, and 2024-25)

Most goals by a player in a single season

- 77 goals
  - Krystyna Freda (2018-19)
