= 2026–27 UEFA Women's Champions League qualifying rounds =

The 2026–27 UEFA Women's Champions League qualifying rounds began on 22 July and ended on 2 September 2026.

A total of 65 teams competed in the qualifying rounds of the 2026–27 UEFA Women's Champions League, which included three rounds, with 43 teams in the Champions Path and 22 teams in the League Path. The nine winners in the third qualifying round (four from Champions Path, five from League Path) advanced to the league phase, to join the nine teams that entered in that round.

Times are CEST (UTC+2), as listed by UEFA (local times, if different, are in parentheses).

== Teams ==
=== Champions Path ===
The Champions Path included all league champions who did not qualify directly for the league phase, and consisted of the following rounds:

- First qualifying round (19 teams playing mini-tournament): 19 teams entered in this round.
- Second qualifying round (28 teams playing mini-tournament): 23 teams entered in this round and five winners of the first qualifying round.
- Third qualifying round (8 teams): one team entered in this round and seven winners of the second qualifying round.

Below are the participating teams of the Champions Path (with their 2026 UEFA club coefficients), grouped by the starting rounds.

Key to colours
Winners of the third qualifying round (Champions Path) will advance to league phase
Losers from the third qualifying round (Champions Path) will enter Europa Cup second qualifying round
Runners-up from the second qualifying round (Champions Path) mini-tournaments entered Europa Cup second qualifying round
Third-placed teams from the second qualifying round (Champions Path) mini-tournaments entered Europa Cup first qualifying round

Third qualifying round
Team	Coeff.
(Czech Republic) Sparta Prague	21.000

Second qualifying round
Team	Coeff.
(Norway) Brann	21.000
(Iceland) Breiðablik	15.000
(Albania) Vllaznia	14.000
(Belgium) OH Leuven	12.250
(Slovenia) Mura	12.000
(Cyprus) Apollon Ladies	12.000
(Hungary) Ferencváros	11.000
(Bosnia and Herzegovina) SFK 2000	11.000
(Lithuania) Gintra	10.500
(Belarus) Dinamo Minsk	10.500
(Denmark) HB Køge	10.500
Austria Wien	10.000
(Ukraine) Metalist 1925 Kharkiv	9.000
(Luxembourg) Racing Union	8.500
(Switzerland) Servette Chênois	8.500
(Netherlands) PSV Eindhoven	5.500
(Romania) Farul Constanța	4.500
(Scotland) Heart of Midlothian	2.550
(Turkey) Fenerbahçe	2.500
(Finland) HJK	2.000
(Kazakhstan) Aktobe	2.000
(Serbia) TSC Bačka Topola	1.950
(Croatia) Hajduk Split	1.900

First qualifying round
Team	Coeff.
(Greece) PAOK	8.000
(Slovakia) Spartak Myjava	6.000
(Estonia) Flora	5.500
(Kosovo) Mitrovica	4.000
(Northern Ireland) Glentoran	4.000
(Faroe Islands) KÍ Klaksvík	4.000
(Republic of Ireland) Athlone Town	2.500
(Armenia) Pyunik	2.500
(Azerbaijan) Neftçi	2.000
(Poland) Czarni Sosnowiec	1.600
(Latvia) Riga FC	1.500
(Malta) Mġarr United	1.500
(Montenegro) Budućnost Podgorica	1.300
(Georgia (country)) Nike Lusso	1.300
(North Macedonia) Skopje 2014	1.300
(Israel) Hapoel Katamon Jerusalem	1.200
(Bulgaria) Ludogorets Razgrad	1.000
(Moldova) Zimbru Chișinău	0.900
(Wales) Wrexham	0.800

=== League Path ===
The League Path will include all league non-champions and consisted of the following rounds:

- Second qualifying round (16 teams playing mini-tournament): 16 teams entered in this round.
- Third qualifying round (10 teams): six teams entered in this round and four winners of the second qualifying round.

Below are the participating teams of the League Path (with their 2026 UEFA club coefficients), grouped by the starting rounds.

Key to colours
Winners of the third qualifying round (League Path) will advance to league phase
Losers from the third qualifying round (League Path) will enter Europa Cup second qualifying round
Runners-up from the second qualifying round (League Path) mini-tournaments entered Europa Cup second qualifying round
Third-placed teams from the second qualifying round (League Path) mini-tournaments entered Europa Cup first qualifying round

Third qualifying round
Team	Coeff.
(England) Chelsea	95.500
(Germany) VfL Wolfsburg	73.000
(France) Paris Saint-Germain	63.000
(Spain) Real Madrid	60.500
(Spain) Real Sociedad	14.999
(Italy) Inter Milan	9.116

Second qualifying round
Team	Coeff.
(Italy) Juventus	51.250
(Germany) Eintracht Frankfurt	28.000
(Austria) St. Pölten	26.000
(Sweden) Hammarby IF	23.500
(Czech Republic) Slavia Prague	23.500
(Norway) Vålerenga	21.000
(Netherlands) Ajax	20.500
(Portugal) Sporting CP	13.000
(Portugal) Torreense	7.400
(Switzerland) Young Boys	6.000
(Sweden) Malmö FF	5.933
(Denmark) Brøndby	4.500
(Scotland) Rangers	4.000
(Ukraine) SeaSters Odesa	3.000
(Albania) Apolonia	2.500
(Cyprus) Omonia	2.000

== Format ==
The first and second qualifying rounds consisted of mini-tournaments with two semi-finals, a final and a third-place play-off hosted by one of the participating teams. If the score was level at the end of normal time, extra time was played, and if the same number of goals was scored by both teams during extra time, the tie was decided by a penalty shoot-out. The third qualifying round was played over two legs, with each team playing one leg at home. The team that scored more goals on aggregate over the two legs advanced to the next round. If the aggregate score was level at the end of normal time of the second leg, extra time was played, and if the same number of goals was scored by both teams at the end of normal time, the tie was decided by a penalty shoot-out.

In the draws for each round, teams were seeded based on their UEFA club coefficients at the beginning of the season, with the teams divided into seeded and unseeded pots containing the same number of teams. Prior to the draws, UEFA may form "groups" in accordance with the principles set by the UEFA Women's Football Committee, but they were purely for convenience of the draw and did not resemble any real groupings in the sense of the competition. Teams from associations with political conflicts as decided by UEFA were not drawn into the same tie. After the draws, the order of legs of a tie could have been reversed by UEFA due to scheduling or venue conflicts.

== Schedule ==
The schedule of the competition was as follows (all draws will be held at the UEFA headquarters in Nyon, Switzerland).

Schedule for 2026–27 UEFA Women's Champions League qualifying rounds
Round	Draw date	First leg	Second leg
First qualifying round	18 June 2026	22 July 2026 (semi-finals)	25 July 2026 (third-place play-off & final)
Second qualifying round	18 June 2026	4–5 August 2026 (semi-finals)	7–8 August 2026 (third-place play-off & final)
Third qualifying round	11 August 2026	25–26 August 2026	1–2 September 2026

== First qualifying round ==
=== Seeding ===
The draw for the first qualifying round was held on 18 June 2026.

A total of 19 teams competed in the first qualifying round. Seeding of the teams was based on their 2026 UEFA club coefficients. Before the draw, UEFA divided the teams into one group of four seeded and four unseeded teams and one another group of six seeded and five unseeded teams per the principles set by the UEFA Women's Football Committee. Teams were drawn into two semi-finals within each four team group and, for the group with three teams, the team with the highest coefficient was given a bye to the final. In the semi-finals, seeded teams were considered the "home" team, while in the third-place play-offs and finals, the teams with the highest coefficients were considered the "home" team for administrative purposes. Due to political reasons, teams from the following associations could not be drawn into the same group: Armenia / Azerbaijan.

Group 1		Group 2	
Seeded	Unseeded	Seeded	Unseeded
(Greece) PAOK; (Kosovo) Mitrovica; (Faroe Islands) KÍ Klaksvík; (Azerbaijan) Neftçi	(Montenegro) Budućnost Podgorica; (Israel) Hapoel Katamon Jerusalem; (Bulgaria) Ludogorets Razgrad; (Moldova) Zimbru Chișinău	(Slovakia) Spartak Myjava; (Estonia) Flora; (Northern Ireland) Glentoran; (Republic of Ireland) Athlone Town; (Armenia) Pyunik; (Poland) Czarni Sosnowiec	(Latvia) Riga FC; (Malta) Mġarr United; (Georgia (country)) Nike Lusso; (North Macedonia) Skopje 2014; (Wales) Wrexham

=== Champions Path ===
==== Mini-tournament 1 ====
===== Bracket =====
Hosted by PAOK.

Semi-finals
22 July
(Greece) PAOK	3
(Israel) Hapoel Katamon Jerusalem	1
22 July
(Azerbaijan) Neftçi (p)	0 (4)
(Montenegro) Budućnost Podgorica	0 (3)

Final
25 July
(Greece) PAOK	3
(Azerbaijan) Neftçi	0
Third place
25 July
(Montenegro) Budućnost Podgorica	0
(Israel) Hapoel Katamon Jerusalem	1

===== Semi-finals =====
22 July 2026
10:00 (11:00 UTC+3)

Neftçi (Azerbaijan)	0–0 (a.e.t.)	(Montenegro) Budućnost Podgorica
	Report
Penalties
Mollayeva (penalty missed); Jafarzade (penalty scored); Arhan (penalty scored); Hajiyeva (penalty scored); Sharifova (penalty scored)	4–3	(penalty missed) Vlahović; (penalty scored) Peterson-Kundok; (penalty scored) McCleary; (penalty missed) Caković; (penalty scored) Balević

Veria Municipal Stadium, Veria
Attendance: 20
Referee: Ilona Birgėlaitė (Lithuania)

22 July 2026
17:30 (18:30 UTC+3)

PAOK (Greece)	3–1	(Israel) Hapoel Katamon Jerusalem
Gkouni 41', 85'; Gačanica 90+2'	Report	Jaielly 61'

Veria Municipal Stadium, Veria
Attendance: 650
Referee: Marta San Juan (Andorra)

===== Third-place play-off =====
25 July 2026
10:00 (11:00 UTC+3)

Budućnost Podgorica (Montenegro)	0–1	(Israel) Hapoel Katamon Jerusalem
	Report	Jaielly 7'

Veria Municipal Stadium, Veria
Attendance: 70
Referee: Bríet Bragadóttir (Iceland)

===== Final =====
25 July 2026
17:30 (18:30 UTC+3)

PAOK (Greece)	3–0	(Azerbaijan) Neftçi
Argyriou 9'; Gačanica 34' (pen.), 63'	Report

Veria Municipal Stadium, Veria
Attendance: 490
Referee: Oxana Cruc (Moldova)

==== Mini-tournament 2 ====
===== Bracket =====
Hosted by Mitrovica.

Semi-finals
22 July
(Faroe Islands) KÍ Klaksvík	0
(Bulgaria) Ludogorets Razgrad	3
22 July
(Kosovo) Mitrovica	10
(Moldova) Zimbru Chișinău	0

Final
25 July
(Kosovo) Mitrovica	2
(Bulgaria) Ludogorets Razgrad	0
Third place
25 July
(Faroe Islands) KÍ Klaksvík	4
(Moldova) Zimbru Chișinău	1

===== Semi-finals =====
22 July 2026
16:30

KÍ Klaksvík (Faroe Islands)	0–3	(Bulgaria) Ludogorets Razgrad
	Report	Baliova 36'; Petrova 43' (pen.); Demirova 63'

Zahir Pajaziti Stadium, Podujevë
Attendance: 30
Referee: Teresa Oliveira (Portugal)

22 July 2026
16:30

Mitrovica (Kosovo)	10–0	(Moldova) Zimbru Chișinău
Kryeziu 13', 17', 42', 44'; Gjegji 24'; Mulliqi 48', 58', 61'; Shala 65'; Mahmuti 88'	Report

Kampi Nacional Hajvalia, Hajvalia
Attendance: 184
Referee: Fabienne Hofer (Austria)

===== Third-place play-off =====
25 July 2026
16:30

KÍ Klaksvík (Faroe Islands)	4–1	(Moldova) Zimbru Chișinău
Hummeland 54', 63', 78'; Olsen 74'	Report	Cojuhari 30'

Kampi Nacional Hajvalia, Hajvalia
Attendance: 23
Referee: Liudmyla Telbukh (Ukraine)

===== Final =====
25 July 2026
20:00

Mitrovica (Kosovo)	2–0	(Bulgaria) Ludogorets Razgrad
Mulliqi 15'; Berisha 61'	Report

Stadiumi Fadil Vokrri, Pristina
Attendance: 261
Referee: Hatice Duygu (Turkey)

==== Mini-tournament 3 ====
===== Bracket =====
Hosted by Wrexham.

Semi-finals
22 July
(Armenia) Pyunik	2
(Wales) Wrexham	4
22 July
(Northern Ireland) Glentoran	1
(Latvia) Riga FC	4

Final
25 July
(Latvia) Riga FC	4
(Wales) Wrexham	1
Third place
25 July
(Northern Ireland) Glentoran	4
(Armenia) Pyunik	2

===== Semi-finals =====
22 July 2026
14:00 (13:00 UTC+1)

Glentoran (Northern Ireland)	1–4	(Latvia) Riga FC
Loughran 84'	Report	Brima 33', 90+2'; Gaugere 56'; Keenan 80' (o.g.)

Cae Ras, Wrexham
Attendance: 142
Referee: Fatemeh Zangeneh (Norway)

22 July 2026
20:00 (19:00 UTC+1)

Pyunik (Armenia)	2–4	(Wales) Wrexham
Badalyan 9'; Ghazaryan 64'	Report	Barker 11'; Jones 50'; Suckley 62'; Thomas 90'

Cae Ras, Wrexham
Attendance: 1,229
Referee: Manon Plandsoen (Netherlands)

===== Third-place play-off =====
25 July 2026
13:00 (12:00 UTC+1)

Glentoran (Northern Ireland)	4–2	(Armenia) Pyunik
Caldwell 45+2'; Conway 53', 63'; Kerr 70'	Report	Badalyan 22'; Yeghyan 90+2'

Cae Ras, Wrexham
Attendance: 206
Referee: Satu Miettunen (Finland)

===== Final =====
25 July 2026
19:00 (18:00 UTC+1)

Riga FC (Latvia)	4–1	(Wales) Wrexham
Ōi 50'; Brima 54'; Kallase 65'; Katō 80'	Report	Jones 8'

Cae Ras, Wrexham
Attendance: 1,192
Referee: Petra Vajdečková (Slovakia)

==== Mini-tournament 4 ====
===== Bracket =====
Hosted by Czarni Sosnowiec.

Semi-finals
22 July
(Poland) Czarni Sosnowiec	7
(Georgia (country)) Nike Lusso	1
22 July
(Republic of Ireland) Athlone Town	4
(North Macedonia) Skopje 2014	0

Final
25 July
(Republic of Ireland) Athlone Town	1
(Poland) Czarni Sosnowiec	3
Third place
25 July
(Georgia (country)) Nike Lusso	2
(North Macedonia) Skopje 2014	0

===== Semi-finals =====
22 July 2026
11:00

Athlone Town (Republic of Ireland)	4–0	(North Macedonia) Skopje 2014
Brennan 19'; Murray 43'; Scheriff 77'; Hand 82'	Report

Zagłębiowski Park Sportowy, Sosnowiec
Attendance: 82
Referee: Ugnė Šmitaitė (Lithuania)

22 July 2026
18:00

Czarni Sosnowiec (Poland)	7–1	(Georgia (country)) Nike Lusso
Miłek 10', 18', 87' (pen.), 90+4' (pen.); Sarapata 31'; Katowicz 60'; Miksone 67'	Report	Mideros 20'

Zagłębiowski Park Sportowy, Sosnowiec
Attendance: 1,426
Referee: Sara Telek (Austria)

===== Third-place play-off =====
25 July 2026
11:00

Nike Lusso (Georgia (country))	2–0	(North Macedonia) Skopje 2014
Metonidze 37'; Khaburdzania 59'	Report

Zagłębiowski Park Sportowy, Sosnowiec
Attendance: 15
Referee: Ines Andrada (Portugal)

===== Final =====
25 July 2026
18:00

Athlone Town (Republic of Ireland)	1–3	(Poland) Czarni Sosnowiec
Ryan 81'	Report	Sarapata 25'; Miłek 47'; Buszewska 58'

Zagłębiowski Park Sportowy, Sosnowiec
Attendance: 1,168
Referee: Eszter Urbán (Hungary)

==== Mini-tournament 5 ====
===== Bracket =====
Hosted by Spartak Myjava.

Semi-finals
22 July
(Estonia) Flora	0
(Malta) Mġarr United	4

Final
25 July
(Slovakia) Spartak Myjava	6
(Malta) Mġarr United	1

===== Semi-finals =====
22 July 2026
18:00

Flora (Estonia)	0–4	(Malta) Mġarr United
	Report	Presley 51', 59', 90+6'; Tullus 70' (o.g.)

Stadium Myjava, Myjava
Attendance: 156
Referee: Farida Lutfaliyeva (Azerbaijan)

===== Final =====
25 July 2026
19:00

Spartak Myjava (Slovakia)	6–1	(Malta) Mġarr United
Bogorová 12' (pen.); Kršiaková 18'; Vredíková 28'; Dvořáková 61'; Dougherty 67'; Mendez 82' (o.g.)	Report	Presley 42'

Stadium Myjava, Myjava
Attendance: 1,154
Referee: Eglantina Pjetrushaj (Albania)

== Second qualifying round ==
=== Seeding ===
The draw for the second qualifying round was held on 18 June 2026.

A total of 44 teams competed in the second qualifying round. Seeding of the teams was based on their 2026 UEFA club coefficients. Before the draw, in the Champions Path, UEFA divided the teams into one group of six seeded and six unseeded teams and one another group of eight seeded and eight unseeded teams per the principles set by the UEFA Women's Football Committee. In the League Path, UEFA divided the teams into one group of four seeded and four unseeded teams and one another group of four seeded and four unseeded teams per the principles set by the UEFA Women's Football Committee. Teams were drawn into two semi-finals within each four team group. In the semi-finals, seeded teams were considered the "home" team, while in the third-place play-offs and finals, the teams with the highest coefficients were considered the "home" team for administrative purposes. Teams from the same association could not be drawn into the same mini-tournament. Due to political reasons, teams from the following associations could not be drawn into the same group: Kosovo / Bosnia and Herzegovina; Kosovo / Serbia; Ukraine / Belarus; Armenia / Azerbaijan.

Champions Path
Group 1		Group 2	
Seeded	Unseeded	Seeded	Unseeded
(Norway) Brann; (Iceland) Breiðablik; (Slovenia) Mura; (Hungary) Ferencváros; (Belarus) Dinamo Minsk; Austria Wien	(Switzerland) Servette Chênois; (Romania) Farul Constanța; (Kazakhstan) Aktobe; (Croatia) Hajduk Split; (Greece) PAOK (Note: Winner of the first qualifying round mini-tournament 1); (Kosovo) Mitrovica (Note: Winner of the first qualifying round mini-tournament 2)	(Albania) Vllaznia; (Belgium) OH Leuven; (Cyprus) Apollon Ladies; (Bosnia and Herzegovina) SFK 2000; (Lithuania) Gintra; (Denmark) HB Køge; (Ukraine) Metalist 1925 Kharkiv; (Luxembourg) Racing Union	(Netherlands) PSV Eindhoven; (Scotland) Heart of Midlothian; (Turkey) Fenerbahçe; (Finland) HJK; (Serbia) TSC Bačka Topola; (Latvia) Riga FC (Note: Winner of the first qualifying round mini-tournament 3); (Poland) Czarni Sosnowiec (Note: Winner of the first qualifying round mini-tournament 4); (Slovakia) Spartak Myjava (Note: Winner of the first qualifying round mini-tournament 5)

League Path
Group 1		Group 2	
Seeded	Unseeded	Seeded	Unseeded
(Italy) Juventus; (Sweden) Hammarby IF; (Czech Republic) Slavia Prague; (Netherlands) Ajax	(Portugal) Torreense; (Denmark) Brøndby; (Scotland) Rangers; (Albania) Apolonia	(Germany) Eintracht Frankfurt; (Austria) St. Pölten; (Norway) Vålerenga; (Portugal) Sporting CP	(Switzerland) Young Boys; (Sweden) Malmö FF; (Ukraine) SeaSters Odesa; (Cyprus) Omonia

=== Champions Path ===
==== Mini-tournament 1 ====
===== Bracket =====
Hosted by Mura.

Semi-finals
5 August
Austria Wien	3
(Croatia) Hajduk Split	2
5 August
(Slovenia) Mura	1
(Romania) Farul Constanța (a.e.t.)	3

Final
8 August
Austria Wien	5
(Romania) Farul Constanța	0
Third place
8 August
(Slovenia) Mura	0
(Croatia) Hajduk Split	2

===== Semi-finals =====
5 August 2026
11:00

Austria Wien	3–2	(Croatia) Hajduk Split
Pfanner 1', 18'; Uka 4'	Report	Čanjevac 45'; Kalaš 47'

Športni park Radenci, Radenci
Attendance: 223
Referee: Lizzy van der Helm (Netherlands)

5 August 2026
18:00

Mura (Slovenia)	1–3 (a.e.t.)	(Romania) Farul Constanța
Zver 63'	Report	Florentina 90+8' (pen.); O'Sullivan 96'; Boycheva 120+3'

Mestni stadion Fazanerija, Murska Sobota
Attendance: 752
Referee: Sapir Berman (Israel)

===== Third-place play-off =====
8 August 2026
11:00

Mura (Slovenia)	0–2	(Croatia) Hajduk Split
	Report	Živković 60'; Bakalar 88' (pen.)

Športni park Radenci, Radenci
Attendance: 316
Referee: Sofiya Prychyna (Ukraine)

===== Final =====
8 August 2026
18:00

Austria Wien	5–0	(Romania) Farul Constanța
Hanshaw 2'; Uka 4', 61' (pen.); Pfattner 66'; Weilharter 75'	Report

Mestni stadion Fazanerija, Murska Sobota
Attendance: 110
Referee: Kristina Georgieva (Bulgaria)

==== Mini-tournament 2 ====
===== Bracket =====
Hosted by Ferencváros.

Semi-finals
5 August
(Norway) Brann	5
(Kosovo) Mitrovica	0
5 August
(Hungary) Ferencváros	2
(Greece) PAOK (a.e.t.)	3

Final
8 August
(Norway) Brann	3
(Greece) PAOK	2
Third place
8 August
(Hungary) Ferencváros	1
(Kosovo) Mitrovica	2

===== Semi-finals =====
5 August 2026
10:00

Brann (Norway)	5–0	(Kosovo) Mitrovica
Zomers 6', 35'; Eikeland 13'; Aahjem 28'; Halbmayr 74'	Report

III. Kerületi TVE stadium, Budapest
Attendance: 141
Referee: Laura Mauricio (Switzerland)

5 August 2026
16:30

Ferencváros (Hungary)	2–3 (a.e.t.)	(Greece) PAOK
Csányi 8'; Kubassova 42'	Report	Andreevska 7'; Argyriou 17'; Tzourtzevits 93'

III. Kerületi TVE stadium, Budapest
Attendance: 251
Referee: Olivia Tschon (Austria)

===== Third-place play-off =====
8 August 2026
10:00

Ferencváros (Hungary)	1–2	(Kosovo) Mitrovica
Czellér 68'	Report	Mulliqi 76', 80'

III. Kerületi TVE stadium, Budapest
Attendance: 1,575
Referee: Maria Marotta (Italy)

===== Final =====
8 August 2026
16:30

Brann (Norway)	3–2	(Greece) PAOK
Zomers 23', 52'; Lehtola 90+6'	Report	Gačanica 11'; Mitkou 90+7' (pen.)

III. Kerületi TVE stadium, Budapest
Attendance: 101
Referee: Karoline Wacker (Germany)

==== Mini-tournament 3 ====
===== Bracket =====
Hosted by Aktobe.

Semi-finals
4 August
(Belarus) Dinamo Minsk	0
(Switzerland) Servette Chênois	3
4 August
(Iceland) Breiðablik	1 (0)
(Kazakhstan) Aktobe (p)	1 (2)

Final
7 August
(Switzerland) Servette Chênois	4
(Kazakhstan) Aktobe	0
Third place
7 August
(Iceland) Breiðablik (a.e.t.)	3
(Belarus) Dinamo Minsk	2

===== Semi-finals =====
4 August 2026
09:00 (12:00 UTC+5)

Dinamo Minsk (Belarus)	0–3	(Switzerland) Servette Chênois
	Report	Nein 54'; Strik 58'; Hernández 60'

Aktobe Ortalyk Stadion, Aktobe
Attendance: 300
Referee: Jelena Kumer (Croatia)

4 August 2026
16:00 (19:00 UTC+5)

Breiðablik (Iceland)	1–1 (a.e.t.)	(Kazakhstan) Aktobe
Duong 16'	Report	Babshuk 12'
Penalties
Albertsdóttir (penalty missed); Duong (penalty missed); Halldórsdóttir (penalty missed); Van Bemmel (penalty missed)	0–2	(penalty scored) Litvinenko; (penalty scored) Babshuk; (penalty missed) Rees

Aktobe Ortalyk Stadion, Aktobe
Attendance: 3,500
Referee: Paola Cebollada López (Spain)

===== Third-place play-off =====
7 August 2026
09:00 (12:00 UTC+5)

Breiðablik (Iceland)	3–2 (a.e.t.)	(Belarus) Dinamo Minsk
Tómasdóttir 53'; Albertsdóttir 90+6', 102'	Report	Pilipenko 14', 62'

Aktobe Ortalyk Stadion, Aktobe
Attendance: 200
Referee: Karoline Marie Jensen (Norway)

===== Final =====
7 August 2026
16:00 (19:00 UTC+5)

Servette Chênois (Switzerland)	4–0	(Kazakhstan) Aktobe
Sobal 20'; Hernández 67'; Martínez 85'; Nein 90+1'	Report

Aktobe Ortalyk Stadion, Aktobe
Attendance: 3,500
Referee: Caroline Lanssens (Belgium)

==== Mini-tournament 4 ====
===== Bracket =====
Hosted by Racing Union.

Semi-finals
5 August
(Bosnia and Herzegovina) SFK 2000	2
(Netherlands) PSV Eindhoven	3
5 August
(Luxembourg) Racing Union	0
(Finland) HJK	2

Final
8 August
(Netherlands) PSV Eindhoven	3
(Finland) HJK	1
Third place
8 August
(Bosnia and Herzegovina) SFK 2000	4
(Luxembourg) Racing Union	1

===== Semi-finals =====
5 August 2026
13:00

SFK 2000 (Bosnia and Herzegovina)	2–3	(Netherlands) PSV Eindhoven
Kršo 31'; Spasojević 78'	Report	Ripa 38'; Cayman 45', 74'

Stade Achille Hammerel, Luxembourg City
Attendance: 80
Referee: Anna Adamska (Poland)

5 August 2026
19:00

Racing Union (Luxembourg)	0–2	(Finland) HJK
	Report	Topra 42'; Kiviranta 80'

Stade Achille Hammerel, Luxembourg City
Attendance: 325
Referee: Hanna Laajanen (Sweden)

===== Third-place play-off =====
8 August 2026
13:00

SFK 2000 (Bosnia and Herzegovina)	4–1	(Luxembourg) Racing Union
Spasojević 38' (pen.), 62'; Pezelj 41'; Terzić 45+2'	Report	Dos Santos 58'

Stade Achille Hammerel, Luxembourg City
Attendance: 163
Referee: Sabina Bolić (Croatia)

===== Final =====
8 August 2026
19:00

PSV Eindhoven (Netherlands)	3–1	(Finland) HJK
Rijsbergen 33', 36', 63'	Report	Holmström 62'

Stade Achille Hammerel, Luxembourg City
Attendance: 196
Referee: Vanja Janković (Slovenia)

==== Mini-tournament 5 ====
===== Bracket =====
Hosted by OH Leuven.

Semi-finals
5 August
(Ukraine) Metalist 1925 Kharkiv	1
(Turkey) Fenerbahçe	2
5 August
(Belgium) OH Leuven	4
(Serbia) TSC Bačka Topola	0

Final
8 August
(Belgium) OH Leuven (p)	1 (4)
(Turkey) Fenerbahçe	1 (2)
Third place
8 August
(Ukraine) Metalist 1925 Kharkiv (a.e.t.)	3
(Serbia) TSC Bačka Topola	2

===== Semi-finals =====
5 August 2026
13:00

Metalist 1925 Kharkiv (Ukraine)	1–2	(Turkey) Fenerbahçe
Hiryn 15'	Report	Türkoğlu 42'; Alves 67'

Den Dreef, Leuven
Attendance: 196
Referee: Zuzana Valentová (Slovakia)

5 August 2026
20:00

OH Leuven (Belgium)	4–0	(Serbia) TSC Bačka Topola
Conijnenberg 33', 66'; Marjanović 49' (o.g.); Janssen 90+2'	Report

Den Dreef, Leuven
Attendance: 641
Referee: Eirini Pingiou (Greece)

===== Third-place play-off =====
8 August 2026
13:00

Metalist 1925 Kharkiv (Ukraine)	3–2 (a.e.t.)	(Serbia) TSC Bačka Topola
Apanashchenko 30', 97'; Shaynyuk 111'	Report	Sovány 90+1'; Kocić 108'

Den Dreef, Leuven
Attendance: 50
Referee: Déborah Anex (Switzerland)

===== Final =====
8 August 2026
20:00

OH Leuven (Belgium)	1–1 (a.e.t.)	(Turkey) Fenerbahçe
Conijnenberg 56'	Report	Plummer 8'
Penalties
Biesmans (penalty scored); Conijnenberg (penalty scored); Kuijpers (penalty missed); Papatheodorou (penalty scored); Gielen (penalty scored)	4–2	(penalty scored) Abideen; (penalty missed) Türkoğlu; (penalty scored) Uraz; (penalty missed) Şeker

Den Dreef, Leuven
Attendance: 1,596
Referee: Elena Gobjila (Moldova)

==== Mini-tournament 6 ====
===== Bracket =====
Hosted by Apollon Ladies.

Semi-finals
5 August
(Albania) Vllaznia	1
(Slovakia) Spartak Myjava	2
5 August
(Cyprus) Apollon Ladies	3 (2)
(Poland) Czarni Sosnowiec (p)	3 (4)

Final
8 August
(Slovakia) Spartak Myjava	2
(Poland) Czarni Sosnowiec	4
Third place
8 August
(Albania) Vllaznia	1
(Cyprus) Apollon Ladies (a.e.t.)	2

===== Semi-finals =====
5 August 2026
16:00 (17:00 UTC+3)

Apollon Ladies (Cyprus)	3–3 (a.e.t.)	(Poland) Czarni Sosnowiec
Mooney 11'; Hudson 40'; Freda 50'	Report	Miłek 18'; Witkowska 45+1'; Sarapata 79'
Penalties
Hardy (penalty missed); Hudson (penalty missed); Ficzay (penalty scored); Prvulović (penalty scored)	2–4	(penalty scored) Miksone; (penalty scored) Sarapata; (penalty scored) Buszewska; (penalty scored) Łapińska

Stelios Kyriakides Stadium, Paphos
Attendance: 260
Referee: Roxana Recorean (Romania)

5 August 2026
20:30 (21:30 UTC+3)

Vllaznia (Albania)	1–2	(Slovakia) Spartak Myjava
Doçi 74'	Report	Bogorová 42'; Vargová 68'

Stelios Kyriakides Stadium, Paphos
Attendance: 20
Referee: Filipa Pereira Cunha (Portugal)

===== Third-place play-off =====
8 August 2026
16:00 (17:00 UTC+3)

Vllaznia (Albania)	1–2 (a.e.t.)	(Cyprus) Apollon Ladies
Doçi 6'	Report	Freda 74', 99'

Stelios Kyriakides Stadium, Paphos
Attendance: 230
Referee: Katalin Sipos (Hungary)

===== Final =====
8 August 2026
20:30 (21:30 UTC+3)

Spartak Myjava (Slovakia)	2–4	(Poland) Czarni Sosnowiec
Bogorová 14' (pen.); Stanović 22'	Report	Sarapata 10', 89'; Miksone 27' (pen.); Wójcik 39'

Stelios Kyriakides Stadium, Paphos
Attendance: 36
Referee: Martina Molinaro (Italy)

==== Mini-tournament 7 ====
===== Bracket =====
Hosted by HB Køge.

Semi-finals
5 August
(Lithuania) Gintra	1
(Scotland) Heart of Midlothian	2
5 August
(Denmark) HB Køge	4
(Latvia) Riga FC	1

Final
8 August
(Denmark) HB Køge	2
(Scotland) Heart of Midlothian	1
Third place
8 August
(Lithuania) Gintra	4
(Latvia) Riga FC	1

===== Semi-finals =====
5 August 2026
15:30

Gintra (Lithuania)	1–2	(Scotland) Heart of Midlothian
Yancey 43'	Report	Dolan 56'; Jardine 66'

Køge Stadion, Køge
Attendance: 123
Referee: Tjaša Misja (Slovenia)

5 August 2026
19:00

HB Køge (Denmark)	4–1	(Latvia) Riga FC
Schultz 24'; Nadim 70'; Thygesen 79'; Taketa 90+2' (o.g.)	Report	Brima 5'

Køge Stadion, Køge
Attendance: 735
Referee: Réka Molnár (Hungary)

===== Third-place play-off =====
8 August 2026
12:00

Gintra (Lithuania)	4–1	(Latvia) Riga FC
Ribeiro 4'; Amorim 52'; Pereviznyk 55'; Yancey 83'	Report	Brima 6'

Køge Stadion, Køge
Attendance: 65
Referee: Angelika Söder (Germany)

===== Final =====
8 August 2026
15:30

HB Køge (Denmark)	2–1	(Scotland) Heart of Midlothian
Jereko 60'; Gejl 90+1'	Report	Jardine 13'

Køge Stadion, Køge
Attendance: 770
Referee: Jelena Cvetković (Serbia)

=== League Path ===
==== Mini-tournament 1 ====
===== Bracket =====
Hosted by Rangers.

Semi-finals
5 August
(Netherlands) Ajax	2
(Denmark) Brøndby	0
5 August
(Czech Republic) Slavia Prague	1
(Scotland) Rangers (a.e.t.)	2

Final
8 August
(Netherlands) Ajax	2
(Scotland) Rangers	1
Third place
8 August
(Czech Republic) Slavia Prague	1 (3)
(Denmark) Brøndby (p)	1 (5)

===== Semi-finals =====
5 August 2026
15:00 (14:00 UTC+1)

Ajax (Netherlands)	2–0	(Denmark) Brøndby
Snoeijs 12'; Van Koppen 20'	Report

Broadwood Stadium, Cumbernauld
Attendance: 77
Referee: Eugenia Gil Soriano (Spain)

5 August 2026
20:30 (19:30 UTC+1)

Slavia Prague (Czech Republic)	1–2 (a.e.t.)	(Scotland) Rangers
Briede 56'	Report	Docherty 82'; Austin 102'

Broadwood Stadium, Cumbernauld
Attendance: 602
Referee: Ana Maria Terteleac (Romania)

===== Third-place play-off =====
8 August 2026
20:30 (19:30 UTC+1)

Slavia Prague (Czech Republic)	1–1 (a.e.t.)	(Denmark) Brøndby
Szewieczková 88'	Report	Bischoff 52'
Penalties
Dubcová (penalty scored); Mikolajová (penalty scored); Briede (penalty missed); Szewieczková (penalty scored)	3–5	(penalty scored) Thestrup; (penalty scored) Karlsen; (penalty scored) Madsen; (penalty scored) Rodgers; (penalty scored) Halldórsdóttir

Broadwood Stadium, Cumbernauld
Attendance: 33
Referee: Lotta Vuorio (Finland)

===== Final =====
8 August 2026
20:30 (19:30 UTC+1)

Ajax (Netherlands)	2–1	(Scotland) Rangers
Noordam 66'; Spitse 90+2' (pen.)	Report	Austin 89'

Petershill Park, Glasgow
Attendance: 504
Referee: Michalina Diakow (Poland)

==== Mini-tournament 2 ====
===== Bracket =====
Hosted by Juventus.

Semi-finals
5 August
(Italy) Juventus	2
(Portugal) Torreense	1
5 August
(Sweden) Hammarby IF	4
(Albania) Apolonia	0

Final
8 August
(Italy) Juventus (a.e.t.)	3
(Sweden) Hammarby IF	1
Third place
8 August
(Portugal) Torreense	5
(Albania) Apolonia	2

===== Semi-finals =====
5 August 2026
15:30

Hammarby IF (Sweden)	4–0	(Albania) Apolonia
Nyhagen 41'; Sørum 45' (pen.); Janzen 57'; Silva Santos 73' (o.g.)	Report

Stadio La Marmora-Pozzo, Biella
Attendance: 137
Referee: Louise Thompson (Northern Ireland)

5 August 2026
21:00

Juventus (Italy)	2–1	(Portugal) Torreense
Carbonell 46'; Capeta 66'	Report	Lakip 90'

Stadio La Marmora-Pozzo, Biella
Attendance: 768
Referee: Hristiyana Guteva (Bulgaria)

===== Third-place play-off =====
8 August 2026
15:30

Torreense (Portugal)	5–2	(Albania) Apolonia
Weimer 3', 53'; Tonkin 25'; Hayes 64' (pen.); Latorre 83'	Report	Owusu 56'; Ameyaa 88'

Stadio La Marmora-Pozzo, Biella
Attendance: 139
Referee: Hristiyana Guteva (Bulgaria)

===== Final =====
8 August 2026
21:00

Juventus (Italy)	3–1 (a.e.t.)	(Sweden) Hammarby IF
Redondo 39'; Chiba 94', 104'	Report	Rehnberg 29'

Stadio La Marmora-Pozzo, Biella
Attendance: 871
Referee: Franziska Wildfeuer (Germany)

==== Mini-tournament 3 ====
===== Bracket =====
Hosted by Eintracht Frankfurt.

Semi-finals
5 August
(Norway) Vålerenga	0
(Sweden) Malmö FF	1
5 August
(Germany) Eintracht Frankfurt	8
(Cyprus) Omonia	0

Final
8 August
(Germany) Eintracht Frankfurt	2
(Sweden) Malmö FF	0
Third place
8 August
(Norway) Vålerenga	2
(Cyprus) Omonia	0

===== Semi-finals =====
5 August 2026
13:00

Vålerenga (Norway)	0–1	(Sweden) Malmö FF
	Report	Lindström 33'

Stadion am Brentanobad, Frankfurt
Attendance: 278
Referee: Marina Živković (Serbia)

5 August 2026
19:00

Eintracht Frankfurt (Germany)	8–0	(Cyprus) Omonia
Raso 3'; Mühlhaus 9', 41'; Memeti 34', 44'; Freigang 69'; Açıkgöz 90'; Krumbiegel 90+2'	Report

Stadion am Brentanobad, Frankfurt
Attendance: 3,050
Referee: Volha Blotskaya (Belarus)

===== Third-place play-off =====
8 August 2026
13:00

Vålerenga (Norway)	2–0	(Cyprus) Omonia
Hegg 11' (pen.); Arnesen 78'	Report

Stadion am Brentanobad, Frankfurt
Attendance: 215
Referee: Frederikke Lydia Søkjær (Denmark)

===== Final =====
8 August 2026
19:00

Eintracht Frankfurt (Germany)	2–0	(Sweden) Malmö FF
Freigang 39', 76'	Report

Stadion am Brentanobad, Frankfurt
Attendance: 2,755
Referee: Abigail Byrne (England)

==== Mini-tournament 4 ====
===== Bracket =====
Hosted by St. Pölten.

Semi-finals
5 August
(Portugal) Sporting CP	5
(Ukraine) SeaSters Odesa	0
5 August
(Austria) St. Pölten	4
(Switzerland) Young Boys	3

Final
8 August
(Austria) St. Pölten (p)	1 (4)
(Portugal) Sporting CP	1 (1)
Third place
8 August
(Switzerland) Young Boys	1
(Ukraine) SeaSters Odesa	3

===== Semi-finals =====
5 August 2026
14:30

Sporting CP (Portugal)	5–0	(Ukraine) SeaSters Odesa
Dias 20'; Bonsegundo 39', 45+2'; Hernandez Gray 78'; Encarnação 90'	Report

Sportzentrum Niederösterreich, St. Pölten
Attendance: 108
Referee: Merima Čelik (Bosnia and Herzegovina)

5 August 2026
18:00

St. Pölten (Austria)	4–3	(Switzerland) Young Boys
Vágó 7' (pen.); Laino 23'; Aagaard 39'; Rukavina 63'	Report	Frey 41'; Jelčić 58', 85'

NV Arena, St. Pölten
Attendance: 361
Referee: Abbie Hendry (Scotland)

===== Third-place play-off =====
8 August 2026
14:30

Young Boys (Switzerland)	1–3	(Ukraine) SeaSters Odesa
Bachmann 71'	Report	Kalinina 49' (pen.); Tkachuk 54', 61'

Sportzentrum Niederösterreich, St. Pölten
Attendance: 113
Referee: Anastasia Mylopoulou (Greece)

===== Final =====
8 August 2026
18:00

St. Pölten (Austria)	1–1 (a.e.t.)	(Portugal) Sporting CP
Vágó 94'	Report	Encarnação 112'
Penalties
Laino (penalty scored); Rukavina (penalty scored); Vágó (penalty scored); Klein (penalty scored)	4–1	(penalty scored) Encarnação; (penalty missed) Hernandez Gray; (penalty missed) Filipa Pimenta

NV Arena, St. Pölten
Attendance: 327
Referee: Shona Shukrula (Netherlands)

== Third qualifying round ==
=== Seeding ===
The draw for the third qualifying round was held on 11 August 2026.

A total of 18 teams competed in the third qualifying round. Seeding of teams was based on their 2026 UEFA club coefficients, with four seeded and unseeded teams in the Champions Path and five of each in the League Path. Teams were drawn into two-legged-ties, where the first drawn team played the first leg at home. Teams from the same association could not be drawn against each other.

The winners of the ties advanced to the league phase. The losers were transferred to the 2026–27 UEFA Women's Europa Cup second qualifying round.

Champions Path
Seeded	Unseeded
(Czech Republic) Sparta Prague; (Norway) Brann; (Belgium) OH Leuven; (Denmark) HB Køge	Austria Wien; (Switzerland) Servette Chênois; (Netherlands) PSV Eindhoven; (Poland) Czarni Sosnowiec

League Path
Seeded	Unseeded
(England) Chelsea; (Germany) VfL Wolfsburg; (France) Paris Saint-Germain; (Spain) Real Madrid; (Italy) Juventus	(Germany) Eintracht Frankfurt; (Austria) St. Pölten; (Netherlands) Ajax; (Spain) Real Sociedad; (Italy) Inter Milan

=== Summary ===
The first legs were played on 25 and 26 August, and the second legs on 1 and 2 September 2026. The winners of the ties advanced to the league phase.

Third qualifying round
Team 1	Agg.	Team 2	1st leg	2nd leg
Champions Path
Sparta Prague (Czech Republic)	3–5	(Switzerland) Servette Chênois	3–2	0–3
PSV Eindhoven (Netherlands)	1–2	(Denmark) HB Køge	0–1	1–1
Brann (Norway)	2–5	Austria Wien	2–1	0–4
Czarni Sosnowiec (Poland)	2–6 (Note: Order of legs reversed after original draw.)	(Belgium) OH Leuven	1–4	1–2
League Path
Eintracht Frankfurt (Germany)	2–6	(France) Paris Saint-Germain	1–1	1–5 (a.e.t.)
St. Pölten (Austria)	1–4	(Italy) Juventus	0–3	1–1
VfL Wolfsburg (Germany)	3–3 (4–5 p)	(Italy) Inter Milan	2–0	1–3 (a.e.t.)
Chelsea (England)	6–2	(Spain) Real Sociedad	5–2	1–0
Ajax (Netherlands)	1–4	(Spain) Real Madrid	0–2	1–2

=== Champions Path matches ===
26 August 2026
18:30

Sparta Prague (Czech Republic)	3–2	(Switzerland) Servette Chênois
Černá 9'; Rancová 45+2'; Bartoňová 68'	Report	Sobal 15'; Hernández 73'

Stadion Letná, Prague
Attendance: 1,063
Referee: Jelena Cvetković (Serbia)
2 September 2026
18:45

Servette Chênois (Switzerland)	3–0	(Czech Republic) Sparta Prague
Sobal 20', 90+2'; Marinelli 46'	Report

Stade de Genève, Geneva
Attendance: 1,712
Referee: Fabienne Michel (Germany)

Servette Chênois won 5–3 on aggregate.

26 August 2026
19:00

PSV Eindhoven (Netherlands)	0–1	(Denmark) HB Køge
	Report	Carusa 45'

PSV Campus de Herdgang, Eindhoven
Attendance: 1,300
Referee: Catarina Campos (Portugal)
2 September 2026
19:00

HB Køge (Denmark)	1–1	(Netherlands) PSV Eindhoven
Korhonen 47'	Report	Ripa 63'

Køge Stadion, Køge
Attendance: 1,195
Referee: Ewa Augustyn (Poland)

HB Køge won 2–1 on aggregate.

25 August 2026
18:00

Brann (Norway)	2–1	Austria Wien
Lehtola 22'; Davidson 62'	Report	Pfattner 26'

Brann Stadion, Bergen
Attendance: 1,875
Referee: Alina Peşu (Romania)
1 September 2026
18:00

Austria Wien	4–0	(Norway) Brann
Uka 19' (pen.), 50', 77'; Skoglund 66' (o.g.)	Report

Franz-Horr-Stadion, Vienna
Attendance: 1,950
Referee: Eleni Antoniou (Greece)

Austria Wien won 5–2 on aggregate.

26 August 2026
19:00

Czarni Sosnowiec (Poland)	1–4	(Belgium) OH Leuven
Miłek 25'	Report	De Ceuster 6'; Dekker 61', 66'; Hoekx 81'

Zagłębiowski Park Sportowy, Sosnowiec
Attendance: 3,075
Referee: Lina Lehtovaara (Finland)
2 September 2026
20:00

OH Leuven (Belgium)	2–1	(Poland) Czarni Sosnowiec
Biesmans 57'; Conijnenberg 84'	Report	Burzan 44'

Den Dreef, Leuven
Attendance: 1,295
Referee: Ivana Projkovska (North Macedonia)

OH Leuven won 6–2 on aggregate.

=== League Path matches ===
26 August 2026
19:00

Eintracht Frankfurt (Germany)	1–1	(France) Paris Saint-Germain
Mühlhaus 4'	Report	Feller 7'

Stadion am Brentanobad, Frankfurt
Attendance: 4,870
Referee: Marta Huerta de Aza (Spain)
2 September 2026
18:30

Paris Saint-Germain (France)	5–1 (a.e.t.)	(Germany) Eintracht Frankfurt
Kanjinga 36', 96'; Karchaoui 105', 113'; Ajibade 120+1'	Report	Blomqvist 76'

PSG Campus, Poissy
Attendance: 1,032
Referee: Emanuela Rusta (Albania)

Paris Saint-Germain won 6–2 on aggregate.

26 August 2026
20:45

St. Pölten (Austria)	0–3	(Italy) Juventus
	Report	Pinto 8', 80'; Rosucci 38'

NV Arena, St. Pölten
Attendance: 1,240
Referee: Désirée Blanco (Switzerland)
2 September 2026
20:30

Juventus (Italy)	1–1	(Austria) St. Pölten
Pinto 40'	Report	Aagaard 56'

Stadio La Marmora-Pozzo, Biella
Attendance: 802
Referee: Michalina Diakow (Poland)

Juventus won 4–1 on aggregate.

26 August 2026
18:00

VfL Wolfsburg (Germany)	2–0	(Italy) Inter Milan
Prašnikar 42'; Küver 52'	Report

Wolfsburg Stadion, Wolfsburg
Attendance: 2,317
Referee: Iuliana Demetrescu (Romania)
2 September 2026
18:30

Inter Milan (Italy)	3–1 (a.e.t.)	(Germany) VfL Wolfsburg
Bartoli 39'; Polli 85'; Milinković 120+1'	Report	Araśniewicz 111'
Penalties
Magull (penalty scored); Bugeja (penalty scored); Schough (penalty scored); Milinković (penalty scored); Andrés (penalty scored)	5–4	(penalty scored) Minge; (penalty scored) Peddemors; (penalty scored) Linder; (penalty scored) Araśniewicz; (penalty missed) Alber

Stadio Ernesto Breda, Sesto San Giovanni
Attendance: 340
Referee: Olatz Rivera Olmedo (Spain)

3–3 on aggregate; Inter Milan won 5–4 on penalties.

26 August 2026
19:45 (18:45 UTC+1)

Chelsea (England)	5–2	(Spain) Real Sociedad
Girma 29'; Buurman 54'; Malard 67', 88'; James 74'	Report	Marín 7'; Marcos 58'

Plough Lane, London
Attendance: 1,588
Referee: Silvia Gasperotti (Italy)
2 September 2026
19:00

Real Sociedad (Spain)	0–1	(England) Chelsea
	Report	Walsh 54'

Estadio Zubieta, San Sebastián
Attendance: 1,750
Referee: Ivana Martinčić (Croatia)

Chelsea won 6–2 on aggregate.

26 August 2026
19:30

Ajax (Netherlands)	0–2	(Spain) Real Madrid
	Report	Schröder 42'; Levels 73'

De Toekomst, Duivendrecht
Attendance: 2,046
Referee: Maria Sole Ferrieri Caputi (Italy)
2 September 2026
20:00

Real Madrid (Spain)	2–1	(Netherlands) Ajax
Schröder 58'; Caicedo 90+7'	Report	Snoeijs 48'

Estadio Alfredo Di Stéfano, Madrid
Attendance: 1,213
Referee: Frida Klarlund (Denmark)

Real Madrid won 4–1 on aggregate.
