= 2025–26 UEFA Women's Champions League qualifying rounds =

Football tournament qualification stage

The 2025–26 UEFA Women's Champions League qualifying rounds began on 30 July and ended on 18 September 2025.

A total of 65 teams competed in the qualifying rounds of the 2025–26 UEFA Women's Champions League, which included three rounds, with 44 teams in the Champions Path and 21 teams in the League Path. The nine winners in the third round (four from Champions Path, five from League Path) advanced to the league phase, to join the nine teams that entered in that round.

Times are CEST (UTC+2), as listed by UEFA (local times, if different, are in parentheses).

== Teams ==
=== Champions Path ===
The Champions Path included all league champions who did not qualified directly for the league phase, and consisted of the following rounds:

- First Round (21 teams playing mini tournament): 21 teams entered in this round.
- Second Round (28 teams playing mini tournament): 22 teams entered in this round and six winners of the first round finals.
- Third Round (8 teams): one team entered in this round and seven winners of the second round finals.

Below are the participating teams of the Champions Path (with their 2025 UEFA club coefficients), grouped by the starting rounds.

Key to colours
Winners of the third round advanced to league phase
Losers from the third round entered Europa Cup second round
Runners-up from the second round mini-tournaments entered Europa Cup second round
Third-placed teams from the second round mini-tournaments entered Europa Cup first round

Third Round
Team	Coeff.
(Austria) St. Pölten	27.000

Second Round
Team	Coeff.
(Czech Republic) Slavia Prague	24.000
(Sweden) Rosengård	24.000
(Netherlands) Twente	16.000
(Norway) Vålerenga	16.000
(Ukraine) Vorskla Poltava	14.000
(Kazakhstan) BIIK Shymkent	13.500
(Albania) Vllaznia	13.000
(Cyprus) Apollon Ladies	12.000
(Slovenia) Mura	11.000
(Bosnia and Herzegovina) SFK 2000	10.000
(Lithuania) Gintra	9.000
(Hungary) Ferencváros	9.000
(Denmark) Fortuna Hjørring	9.000
(Iceland) Breiðablik	8.500
(Belarus) Dinamo Minsk	7.000
(Switzerland) Young Boys	2.850
(Scotland) Hibernian	2.400
(Serbia) Red Star Belgrade	2.300
(Belgium) OH Leuven	2.200
(Romania) Farul Constanța	2.000
(Finland) HJK	1.900
(Poland) GKS Katowice	1.800

First Round
Team	Coeff.
(Luxembourg) Racing Union	7.500
(Estonia) Flora	6.000
(Israel) Kiryat Gat	6.000
(Georgia (country)) Lanchkhuti	5.500
(Moldova) Agarista Anenii Noi	5.500
(Bulgaria) NSA Sofia	4.500
(Kosovo) Mitrovica	4.000
(Slovakia) Spartak Myjava	4.000
(North Macedonia) Ljuboten	3.500
(Croatia) Agram	2.100
(Wales) Cardiff City	2.000
(Turkey) ABB Fomget	1.900
(Greece) AEK Athens	1.800
(Republic of Ireland) Athlone Town	1.600
(Malta) Swieqi United	1.500
(Latvia) Riga FC	1.300
(Montenegro) Budućnost Podgorica	1.300
(Northern Ireland) Cliftonville	1.200
(Armenia) Pyunik	1.000
(Azerbaijan) Neftçi	1.000
(Faroe Islands) NSÍ Runavík	1.000

=== League Path ===
The League Path included all league non-champions and consisted of the following rounds:

- Second Round (15 teams playing mini tournament): 15 teams entered in this round.
- Third Round (10 teams): six teams entered in this round and four winners of the second round finals.

Below are the participating teams of the League Path (with their 2025 UEFA club coefficients), grouped by the starting rounds.

Key to colours
Winners of the third round advanced to league phase
Losers from the third round league path entered Europa Cup second round
Runners-up from the second round league path mini-tournaments entered Europa Cup second round
Third-placed teams from the second round league path mini-tournaments entered Europa Cup first round

Third Round
Team	Coeff.
(Spain) Real Madrid	43.000
(Sweden) BK Häcken	28.000
(France) Paris FC	14.000
(Spain) Atlético Madrid	13.399
(Germany) Eintracht Frankfurt	12.500
(Portugal) Sporting CP	6.600

Second Round
Team	Coeff.
(Italy) Roma	32.000
(Czech Republic) Sparta Prague	21.000
(Norway) Brann	17.000
(England) Manchester United	13.699
(Iceland) Valur	11.500
(Belarus) FC Minsk	10.500
(Scotland) Glasgow City	10.000
(Sweden) Hammarby IF	8.000
(Italy) Inter Milan	7.600
(Ukraine) Metalist 1925 Kharkiv	7.000
(Portugal) Braga	6.600
(Netherlands) PSV Eindhoven	5.000
Austria Wien	4.150
(Denmark) Nordsjælland	2.950
(Kazakhstan) Aktobe	1.950

== Format ==
First and Second round qualifying consisted of mini-tournaments with two semi-finals, a final and a third-place play-off hosted by one of the participating teams. If the score was level at the end of normal time, extra time was played, and if the same number of goals was scored by both teams during extra time, the tie was decided by a penalty shoot-out. Third round qualifying was played over two legs, with each team playing one leg at home. The team that scored more goals on aggregate over the two legs advanced to the next round. If the aggregate score was level at the end of normal time of the second leg, extra time was played, and if the same number of goals was scored by both teams at the end of normal time, the tie was decided by a penalty shoot-out.

In the draws for each round, teams were seeded based on their UEFA club coefficients at the beginning of the season, with the teams divided into seeded and unseeded pots containing the same number of teams. Prior to the draws, UEFA may form "groups" in accordance with the principles set by the Club Competitions Committee, but they were purely for convenience of the draw and did not resemble any real groupings in the sense of the competition. Teams from associations with political conflicts as decided by UEFA were not drawn into the same tie. After the draws, the order of legs of a tie could have been reversed by UEFA due to scheduling or venue conflicts.

== Schedule ==
The schedule of the competition was as follows (all draws were held at the UEFA headquarters in Nyon, Switzerland).

Schedule for 2025–26 UEFA Women's Champions League qualifying rounds
Round	Draw date	First leg	Second leg
First Round	24 June 2025	30 July 2025 (semi-finals)	2 August 2025 (third-place play-off & final)
Second Round	24 June 2025	27 August 2025 (semi-finals)	30 August 2025 (third-place play-off & final)
Third Round	31 August 2025	11 September 2025	18 September 2025

== First qualifying round ==
=== Seeding ===
The draw for the first qualifying round was held on 24 June 2025.

Seeding of teams for the semi-final round was based on their 2025 UEFA club coefficients, with 12 seeded teams and the remaining teams unseeded in the Champions Path. Teams were drawn into two semi-finals within each four team group and, for the groups with three teams, the team with the highest coefficient was given a bye to the final. In the semi-finals, seeded teams were considered the "home" team, while in the third-place play-offs and finals, the teams with the highest coefficients were considered the "home" team for administrative purposes. Due to political reasons, teams from the following associations could not be drawn into the same group: Armenia / Azerbaijan.

Champions Path
Seeded	Unseeded
(Luxembourg) Racing Union; (Estonia) Flora; (Israel) Kiryat Gat; (Georgia (country)) Lanchkhuti; (Moldova) Agarista Anenii Noi; (Bulgaria) NSA Sofia; (Kosovo) Mitrovica; (Slovakia) Spartak Myjava; (North Macedonia) Ljuboten; (Croatia) Agram; (Wales) Cardiff City; (Turkey) ABB Fomget	(Greece) AEK Athens; (Republic of Ireland) Athlone Town; (Malta) Swieqi United; (Latvia) Riga FC; (Montenegro) Budućnost Podgorica; (Northern Ireland) Cliftonville; (Armenia) Pyunik; (Azerbaijan) Neftçi; (Faroe Islands) NSÍ Runavík

=== Champions Path ===
==== Tournament 1 ====
===== Bracket =====
Hosted by Racing Union.

Semi-finals
30 July
(Luxembourg) Racing Union (a.e.t.)	5
(Greece) AEK Athens	3
30 July
(Estonia) Flora	1
(Latvia) Riga FC	4

Final
2 August
(Luxembourg) Racing Union	2
(Latvia) Riga FC	1
Third place
2 August
(Greece) AEK Athens	1
(Estonia) Flora	0

===== Semi-finals =====
30 July 2025
13:00

Flora (Estonia)	1–4	(Latvia) Riga FC
Teern 27'	Report	Brima 11', 18', 24', 55'

Stade Achille Hammerel, Luxembourg City
Attendance: 52
Referee: Joanna Vassallo (Malta)

30 July 2025
19:00

Racing Union (Luxembourg)	5–3 (a.e.t.)	(Greece) AEK Athens
Quatrana 55', 91'; García 71', 90+1'; Rigaud 101' (pen.)	Report	Koggouli 62', 64'; Chatzinikolaou 79'

Stade Achille Hammerel, Luxembourg City
Attendance: 400
Referee: Mzevinari Sharashanidze (Georgia)

===== Third-place play-off =====
2 August 2025
13:00

Flora (Estonia)	0–1	(Greece) AEK Athens
	Report	Koggouli 65'

Stade Achille Hammerel, Luxembourg City
Attendance: 48
Referee: Tjaša Misja (Slovenia)

===== Final =====
2 August 2025
19:00

Racing Union (Luxembourg)	2–1	(Latvia) Riga FC
Rigaud 14'; Quatrana 65'	Report	Brima 50'

Stade Achille Hammerel, Luxembourg City
Attendance: 437
Referee: Oxana Cruc (Moldova)

==== Tournament 2 ====
===== Bracket =====
Hosted by Spartak Myjava.

Semi-finals
30 July
(Moldova) Agarista Anenii Noi	0
(Malta) Swieqi United	5
30 July
(Slovakia) Spartak Myjava	3
(Montenegro) Budućnost Podgorica	0

Final
2 August
(Malta) Swieqi United	1
(Slovakia) Spartak Myjava (a.e.t.)	2
Third place
2 August
(Moldova) Agarista Anenii Noi	0
(Montenegro) Budućnost Podgorica	3

===== Semi-finals =====
30 July 2025
11:00

Agarista Anenii Noi (Moldova)	0–5	(Malta) Swieqi United
	Report	Abdulai 48', 58'; Yaneva 60'; Saliba 76' (pen.); Kričak 86'

Stadium Myjava, Myjava
Attendance: 150
Referee: Eglantina Pjetrushaj (Albania)

30 July 2025
19:00

Spartak Myjava (Slovakia)	3–0	(Montenegro) Budućnost Podgorica
Bogorová 37'; Nárožná 49'; Vredíková 73'	Report

Stadium Myjava, Myjava
Attendance: 1,329
Referee: Ugne Šmitaite (Lithuania)

===== Third-place play-off =====
2 August 2025
11:00

Agarista Anenii Noi (Moldova)	0–3	(Montenegro) Budućnost Podgorica
	Report	Merdović 17'; Drešaj 82'; Balević 90+4'

Stadium Myjava, Myjava
Attendance: 150
Referee: Abbie Hendry (Scotland)

===== Final =====
2 August 2025
19:00

Spartak Myjava (Slovakia)	2–1 (a.e.t.)	(Malta) Swieqi United
Kramlíková 44'; Bogorová 101'	Report	Saliba 36'

Stadium Myjava, Myjava
Attendance: 1,412
Referee: Sofiya Prychyna (Ukraine)

==== Tournament 3 ====
===== Bracket =====
Hosted by Ljuboten.

Semi-finals
30 July
(North Macedonia) Ljuboten	4
(Faroe Islands) NSÍ Runavík	1
30 July
(Bulgaria) NSA Sofia	0
(Armenia) Pyunik	1

Final
2 August
(North Macedonia) Ljuboten	4
(Armenia) Pyunik	0
Third place
2 August
(Faroe Islands) NSÍ Runavík	4
(Bulgaria) NSA Sofia	0

===== Semi-finals =====
30 July 2025
11:00

NSA Sofia (Bulgaria)	0–1	(Armenia) Pyunik
	Report	Asatryan 90+1'

Petar Miloševski Training Centre, Skopje
Attendance: 50
Referee: Satu Miettunen (Finland)

30 July 2025
17:00

Ljuboten (North Macedonia)	4–1	(Faroe Islands) NSÍ Runavík
Markovska 15'; Mustafa 24'; Maksuti 45'; Ohadiwe 63'	Report	Benbakoura 12'

Petar Miloševski Training Centre, Skopje
Attendance: 150
Referee: Charlotte Carpenter (Wales)

===== Third-place play-off =====
2 August 2025
11:00

NSA Sofia (Bulgaria)	0–4	(Faroe Islands) NSÍ Runavík
	Report	Mortensen 25'; Zakariasardóttir 39'; Sevdal 64'; Olsen 83' (pen.)

Petar Miloševski Training Centre, Skopje
Attendance: 30
Referee: Laura Mauricio (Switzerland)

===== Final =====
2 August 2025
17:00

Ljuboten (North Macedonia)	4–0	(Armenia) Pyunik
Mustafa 39', 55', 89', 90+6'	Report

Petar Miloševski Training Centre, Skopje
Attendance: 110
Referee: Elisabet Calvo Valentín (Spain)

==== Tournament 4 ====
===== Bracket =====
Hosted in a neutral venue.

Semi-finals
30 July
(Turkey) ABB Fomget	2
(Azerbaijan) Neftçi	0

Final
2 August
(Israel) Kiryat Gat	1
(Turkey) ABB Fomget	3

===== Semi-finals =====
30 July 2025
18:00

ABB Fomget (Turkey)	2–0	(Azerbaijan) Neftçi
Rangel 21'; Kuč 49'	Report

House of Football, Tirana, Albania
Attendance: 150
Referee: Hanna Laajanen (Sweden)

===== Final =====
2 August 2025
18:00

Kiryat Gat (Israel)	1–3	(Turkey) ABB Fomget
Selimhodzic 45+4'	Report	Kuč 29', 37'; Ovdiychuk 59'

House of Football, Tirana, Albania
Attendance: 100
Referee: Jana Van Laere (Belgium)

==== Tournament 5 ====
===== Bracket =====
Hosted by Athlone Town.

Semi-finals
30 July
(Wales) Cardiff City	0
(Republic of Ireland) Athlone Town	4

Final
2 August
(Croatia) Agram	0
(Republic of Ireland) Athlone Town	3

===== Semi-finals =====
30 July 2025
20:30 (19:30 UTC+1)

Cardiff City (Wales)	0–4	(Republic of Ireland) Athlone Town
	Report	Groves 15'; Molloy 40', 43'; Waesch 49'

Athlone Town Stadium, Athlone
Attendance: 1,916
Referee: Karoline Marie Jensen (Norway)

===== Final =====
2 August 2025
17:00 (16:00 UTC+1)

Agram (Croatia)	0–3	(Republic of Ireland) Athlone Town
	Report	Gibson 18', 45+2'; Waesch 22'

Athlone Town Stadium, Athlone
Attendance: 1,715
Referee: Briet Bragadottir (Iceland)

==== Tournament 6 ====
===== Bracket =====
Hosted by Mitrovica.

Semi-finals
30 July
(Kosovo) Mitrovica	1
(Northern Ireland) Cliftonville (a.e.t.)	3

Final
2 August
(Georgia (country)) Lanchkhuti	2
(Northern Ireland) Cliftonville	1

===== Semi-finals =====
30 July 2025
16:00

Mitrovica (Kosovo)	1–3 (a.e.t.)	(Northern Ireland) Cliftonville
Mulliqi 45+2'	Report	Devine 84', 100', 113'

Zahir Pajaziti Stadium, Podujevë
Attendance: 100
Referee: Melek Dakan (Turkey)

===== Final =====
2 August 2025
19:00

Lanchkhuti (Georgia (country))	2–1	(Northern Ireland) Cliftonville
Tsikaridze 55'; Sulashvili 56'	Report	Magee 90'

Fadil Vokrri Stadium, Pristina
Attendance: 17
Referee: Anna Adamska (Poland)

== Second qualifying round ==
=== Seeding ===
The draw for the second qualifying round was held on 24 June 2025.

Seeding of teams for the semi-final round was based on their 2025 UEFA club coefficients. As in first round qualifying, teams were drawn into two semi-finals within each four team group and, for the groups with three teams, the team with the highest coefficient was given a bye to the final. In the semi-finals, seeded teams were considered the "home" team, while in the third-place play-offs and finals, the teams with the highest coefficients were considered the "home" team for administrative purposes. Due to political reasons, teams from the following associations could not be drawn into the same group: Kosovo / Bosnia and Herzegovina; Kosovo / Serbia; Ukraine / Belarus.

Champions Path
Seeded	Unseeded
(Czech Republic) Slavia Prague; (Sweden) Rosengård; (Netherlands) Twente; (Norway) Vålerenga; (Ukraine) Vorskla Poltava; (Kazakhstan) BIIK Shymkent; (Albania) Vllaznia; (Cyprus) Apollon Ladies; (Slovenia) Mura; (Bosnia and Herzegovina) SFK 2000; (Lithuania) Gintra; (Hungary) Ferencváros; (Denmark) Fortuna Hjørring; (Iceland) Breiðablik	(Belarus) Dinamo Minsk; (Switzerland) Young Boys; (Scotland) Hibernian; (Serbia) Red Star Belgrade; (Belgium) OH Leuven; (Romania) Farul Constanța; (Finland) HJK; (Poland) GKS Katowice; (Luxembourg) Racing Union (Note: Winner of the first qualifying round mini-tournament 1); (Slovakia) Spartak Myjava (Note: Winner of the first qualifying round mini-tournament 2); (North Macedonia) Ljuboten (Note: Winner of the first qualifying round mini-tournament 3); (Turkey) ABB Fomget (Note: Winner of the first qualifying round mini-tournament 4); (Republic of Ireland) Athlone Town (Note: Winner of the first qualifying round mini-tournament 5); (Georgia (country)) Lanchkhuti (Note: Winner of the first qualifying round mini-tournament 6)

League Path
Seeded	Unseeded
(Italy) Roma; (Czech Republic) Sparta Prague; (Norway) Brann; (England) Manchester United; (Iceland) Valur; (Belarus) FC Minsk; (Scotland) Glasgow City; (Sweden) Hammarby IF	(Italy) Inter Milan; (Ukraine) Metalist 1925 Kharkiv; (Portugal) Braga; (Netherlands) PSV Eindhoven; Austria Wien; (Denmark) Nordsjælland; (Kazakhstan) Aktobe

=== Champions Path ===
==== Tournament 1 ====
===== Bracket =====
Hosted by Mura.

Semi-finals
27 August
(Slovenia) Mura	3
(Slovakia) Spartak Myjava	2
27 August
(Kazakhstan) BIIK Shymkent	0
(Poland) GKS Katowice	2

Final
30 August
(Slovenia) Mura	0
(Poland) GKS Katowice	2
Third place
30 August
(Slovakia) Spartak Myjava	1
(Kazakhstan) BIIK Shymkent	2

===== Semi-finals =====
27 August 2025
11:00

BIIK Shymkent (Kazakhstan)	0–2	(Poland) GKS Katowice
	Report	Nieciąg 23', 38'

Športni park Radenci, Radenci
Attendance: 70
Referee: Merima Čelik (Bosnia and Herzegovina)

27 August 2025
18:00

Mura (Slovenia)	3–2	(Slovakia) Spartak Myjava
Vindišar 19'; Olszewska 50'; Milović 58'	Report	Vredíková 13'; Nárožná 87' (pen.)

Fazanerija City Stadium, Murska Sobota
Attendance: 1,050
Referee: Kristina Kozoroh (Ukraine)

===== Third-place play-off =====
30 August 2025
11:00

BIIK Shymkent (Kazakhstan)	2–1	(Slovakia) Spartak Myjava
Nurusheva 64'; Rogers 90+7'	Report	Bogorová 57'

Športni park Radenci, Radenci
Attendance: 80
Referee: Ana Maria Terteleac (Romania)

===== Final =====
30 August 2025
18:00

Mura (Slovenia)	0–2	(Poland) GKS Katowice
	Report	Maciążka 14'; Kaláberová 50'

Fazanerija City Stadium, Murska Sobota
Attendance: 800
Referee: Deborah Bianchi (Italy)

==== Tournament 2 ====
===== Bracket =====
Hosted by Apollon Ladies.

Semi-finals
27 August
(Cyprus) Apollon Ladies	0
(Switzerland) Young Boys	1
27 August
(Denmark) Fortuna Hjørring	2
(Scotland) Hibernian	1

Final
30 August
(Switzerland) Young Boys	0
(Denmark) Fortuna Hjørring	1
Third place
30 August
(Cyprus) Apollon Ladies	2
(Scotland) Hibernian	3

===== Semi-finals =====
27 August 2025
16:00 (17:00 UTC+3)

Apollon Ladies (Cyprus)	0–1	(Switzerland) Young Boys
	Report	Waeber 71' (pen.)

Stelios Kyriakides Stadium, Paphos
Attendance: 250
Referee: Emilie Torkelsen (Norway)

27 August 2025
20:30 (21:30 UTC+3)

Fortuna Hjørring (Denmark)	2–1	(Scotland) Hibernian
Ogochukwu 70'; Nielsen 90+1'	Report	Boyle 47'

Stelios Kyriakides Stadium, Paphos
Attendance: 170
Referee: Rasa Grigonė (Lithuania)

===== Third-place play-off =====
30 August 2025
16:00 (17:00 UTC+3)

Apollon Ladies (Cyprus)	2–3	(Scotland) Hibernian
Hardy 39', 90+3'	Report	McGovern 23', 48', 90'

Stelios Kyriakides Stadium, Paphos
Attendance: 200
Referee: Jelena Medjedovic (Serbia)

===== Final =====
30 August 2025
20:30 (21:30 UTC+3)

Fortuna Hjørring (Denmark)	1–0	(Switzerland) Young Boys
Ogochukwu 58'	Report

Stelios Kyriakides Stadium, Paphos
Attendance: 40
Referee: Shona Shukrula (Netherlands)

==== Tournament 3 ====
===== Bracket =====
Hosted by OH Leuven.

Semi-finals
27 August
(Bosnia and Herzegovina) SFK 2000	1
(Belgium) OH Leuven (a.e.t.)	2
27 August
(Sweden) Rosengård	5
(North Macedonia) Ljuboten	0

Final
30 August
(Belgium) OH Leuven	3
(Sweden) Rosengård	2
Third place
30 August
(Bosnia and Herzegovina) SFK 2000	5
(North Macedonia) Ljuboten	0

===== Semi-finals =====
27 August 2025
13:00

Rosengård (Sweden)	5–0	(North Macedonia) Ljuboten
Imo 44' (pen.), 59'; Sjöström 52'; Larsson 80', 90+1'	Report

Den Dreef, Leuven
Attendance: 60
Referee: Martina Molinaro (Italy)

27 August 2025
20:00

SFK 2000 (Bosnia and Herzegovina)	1–2 (a.e.t.)	(Belgium) OH Leuven
Harrison 104'	Report	Hermans 106'; De Ceuster 108'

Den Dreef, Leuven
Attendance: 1,183
Referee: Katalin Sipos (Hungary)

===== Third-place play-off =====
30 August 2025
13:00

SFK 2000 (Bosnia and Herzegovina)	5–0	(North Macedonia) Ljuboten
Spahić 29' (pen.); Terzić 45+1'; Kršo 48'; Zukić 56'; Jones-Baidoe 75'	Report

Den Dreef, Leuven
Attendance: 51
Referee: Olivia Tschon (Austria)

===== Final =====
30 August 2025
20:00

Rosengård (Sweden)	2–3	(Belgium) OH Leuven
Larsson 60'; Imo 71'	Report	Reynders 10'; Conijnenberg 18', 35'

Den Dreef, Leuven
Attendance: 998
Referee: Michalina Diakow (Poland)

==== Tournament 4 ====
===== Bracket =====
Hosted by Vllaznia.

Semi-finals
27 August
(Hungary) Ferencváros	3
(Luxembourg) Racing Union	0
27 August
(Albania) Vllaznia	1
(Belarus) Dinamo Minsk	2

Final
30 August
(Hungary) Ferencváros	4
(Belarus) Dinamo Minsk	0
Third place
30 August
(Luxembourg) Racing Union	1
(Albania) Vllaznia	3

===== Semi-finals =====
27 August 2025
10:00

Ferencváros (Hungary)	3–0	(Luxembourg) Racing Union
Garcia 35'; Wojdyla 42' (o.g.); Va. Nagy 47'	Report

Loro Boriçi Stadium, Shkodër
Attendance: 50
Referee: Tatyana Sorokopudova (Kazakhstan)

27 August 2025
19:00

Vllaznia (Albania)	1–2	(Belarus) Dinamo Minsk
Bajraktari 88'	Report	Tsikhamirava 44'; Pilipenko 54'

Loro Boriçi Stadium, Shkodër
Attendance: 2,300
Referee: Henrikke Nervik (Norway)

===== Third-place play-off =====
30 August 2025
10:00

Vllaznia (Albania)	3–1	(Luxembourg) Racing Union
Bajraktari 27'; Doçi 28'; Deda 33'	Report	Corplet 84'

Loro Boriçi Stadium, Shkodër
Attendance: 200
Referee: Ainara Acevedo (Spain)

===== Final =====
30 August 2025
19:00

Ferencváros (Hungary)	4–0	(Belarus) Dinamo Minsk
Garcia 3'; Va. Nagy 14', 45+1' (pen.); Kubassova 78'	Report

Loro Boriçi Stadium, Shkodër
Attendance: 50
Referee: Deborah Anex (Switzerland)

==== Tournament 5 ====
===== Bracket =====
Hosted by Gintra.

Semi-finals
27 August
(Lithuania) Gintra	2
(Romania) Farul Constanța	1
27 August
(Ukraine) Vorskla Poltava	5
(Georgia (country)) Lanchkhuti	0

Final
30 August
(Lithuania) Gintra	0
(Ukraine) Vorskla Poltava	2
Third place
30 August
(Romania) Farul Constanța	4
(Georgia (country)) Lanchkhuti	1

===== Semi-finals =====
27 August 2025
11:00 (12:00 UTC+3)

Vorskla Poltava (Ukraine)	5–0	(Georgia (country)) Lanchkhuti
Kalinina 28', 52', 86'; Radionova 55'; Kravchuk 71'	Report

Savivaldybė Stadium, Šiauliai
Attendance: 150
Referee: Cansu Tryak (Turkey)

27 August 2025
17:00 (18:00 UTC+3)

Gintra (Lithuania)	2–1	(Romania) Farul Constanța
Spenazzatto 55'; Ribeiro 83'	Report	Stancu 63'

Savivaldybė Stadium, Šiauliai
Attendance: 950
Referee: Jeļena Jermolajeva (Latvia)

===== Third-place play-off =====
30 August 2025
11:00 (12:00 UTC+3)

Lanchkhuti (Georgia (country))	1–4	(Romania) Farul Constanța
Sulashvili 39'	Report	Florentina 57'; Stanciu 63'; Gnaly 77'; Pînzariu 79'

Savivaldybė Stadium, Šiauliai
Attendance: 40
Referee: Michèle Schmölzer (Switzerland)

===== Final =====
30 August 2025
17:00 (18:00 UTC+3)

Vorskla Poltava (Ukraine)	2–0	(Lithuania) Gintra
Radionova 23' (pen.); Kalinina 58' (pen.)	Report

Savivaldybė Stadium, Šiauliai
Attendance: 1,100
Referee: Emanuela Rusta (Albania)

==== Tournament 6 ====
===== Bracket =====
Hosted by Twente.

Semi-finals
27 August
(Netherlands) Twente	6
(Serbia) Red Star Belgrade	0
27 August
(Iceland) Breiðablik	3
(Republic of Ireland) Athlone Town	1

Final
30 August
(Netherlands) Twente	2
(Iceland) Breiðablik	0
Third place
30 August
(Serbia) Red Star Belgrade	0
(Republic of Ireland) Athlone Town	2

===== Semi-finals =====
27 August 2025
13:00

Breiðablik (Iceland)	3–1	(Republic of Ireland) Athlone Town
Smith 47', 76'; Þorvaldsdóttir 77'	Report	Groves 59'

Sportpark Schreurserve, Enschede
Attendance: 150
Referee: Anastasia Mylopoulou (Greece)

27 August 2025
19:00

Twente (Netherlands)	6–0	(Serbia) Red Star Belgrade
Ravensbergen 59'; Roord 78', 83'; Tuin 82'; Proost 89'; Oude Elberink 90+3'	Report

Sportpark Schreurserve, Enschede
Attendance: 389
Referee: Lovisa Johansson (Sweden)

===== Third-place play-off =====
30 August 2025
13:00

Red Star Belgrade (Serbia)	0–2	(Republic of Ireland) Athlone Town
	Report	Brady 12'; Molloy 51'

Sportpark Schreurserve, Enschede
Attendance: 85
Referee: Minka Vekkeli (Finland)

===== Final =====
30 August 2025
19:00

Twente (Netherlands)	2–0	(Iceland) Breiðablik
Proost 64'; Ravensbergen 78'	Report

Sportpark Schreurserve, Enschede
Attendance: 521
Referee: Hristiyana Guteva (Bulgaria)

==== Tournament 7 ====
===== Bracket =====
Hosted by HJK.

Semi-finals
27 August
(Czech Republic) Slavia Prague	2
(Turkey) ABB Fomget	1
27 August
(Norway) Vålerenga	1
(Finland) HJK	0

Final
30 August
(Czech Republic) Slavia Prague	0
(Norway) Vålerenga	4
Third place
30 August
(Turkey) ABB Fomget	3
(Finland) HJK	2

===== Semi-finals =====
27 August 2025
12:00 (13:00 UTC+3)

Slavia Prague (Czech Republic)	2–1	(Turkey) ABB Fomget
McLaughlin 46'; Svitková 49'	Report	Kuč 90+5'

Töölö Football Stadium, Helsinki
Attendance: 136
Referee: Réka Molnar (Hungary)

27 August 2025
18:00 (19:00 UTC+3)

Vålerenga (Norway)	1–0	(Finland) HJK
Sævik 30' (pen.)	Report

Helsinki Football Stadium, Helsinki
Attendance: 1,537
Referee: Teresa Oliveira (Portugal)

===== Third-place play-off =====
30 August 2025
12:00 (13:00 UTC+3)

HJK (Finland)	2–3	(Turkey) ABB Fomget
Sievistö 45+3'; Heroum 90+8'	Report	Alves 40'; Dias 70'; Kuč 80'

Helsinki Football Stadium, Helsinki
Attendance: 602
Referee: Caroline Lanssens (Belgium)

===== Final =====
30 August 2025
18:00 (19:00 UTC+3)

Slavia Prague (Czech Republic)	0–4	(Norway) Vålerenga
	Report	Brekken 47'; Preus 49'; Hørte 76'; Sesay 90+1'

Helsinki Football Stadium, Helsinki
Attendance: 104
Referee: Abigail Byrne (England)

=== League Path ===
==== Tournament 1 ====
===== Bracket =====
Hosted by Hammarby IF.

Semi-finals
27 August
(Sweden) Hammarby IF	5
(Ukraine) Metalist 1925 Kharkiv	4
27 August
(England) Manchester United	4
(Netherlands) PSV Eindhoven	0

Final
30 August
(Sweden) Hammarby IF	0
(England) Manchester United	1
Third place
30 August
(Ukraine) Metalist 1925 Kharkiv	0
(Netherlands) PSV Eindhoven	2

===== Semi-finals =====
27 August 2025
12:00

Manchester United (England)	4–0	(Netherlands) PSV Eindhoven
Terland 7', 53', 64'; Bizet 32'	Report

Stockholm Arena, Stockholm
Attendance: 370
Referee: Vanja Janković (Slovenia)

27 August 2025
19:00

Hammarby IF (Sweden)	5–4	(Ukraine) Metalist 1925 Kharkiv
Wangerheim 5', 60'; Tandberg 62', 90+3'; Blakstad 69'	Report	Hiryn 22'; Apanashchenko 55'; Bragstad 80' (o.g.); Andrukhiv 90'

Stockholm Arena, Stockholm
Attendance: 1,964
Referee: Alexandra Collin (France)

===== Third-place play-off =====
30 August 2025
12:00

Metalist 1925 Kharkiv (Ukraine)	0–2	(Netherlands) PSV Eindhoven
	Report	Nijstad 7'; Thrige 38'

Stockholm Arena, Stockholm
Attendance: 109
Referee: Franziska Wildfeuer (Germany)

===== Final =====
30 August 2025
19:00

Manchester United (England)	1–0	(Sweden) Hammarby IF
Terland 61'	Report

Stockholm Arena, Stockholm
Attendance: 5,546
Referee: Michaela Pachtová (Czech Republic)

==== Tournament 2 ====
===== Bracket =====
Hosted by Sparta Prague.

Semi-finals
27 August
(Italy) Roma	2
(Kazakhstan) Aktobe	0
27 August
(Czech Republic) Sparta Prague (a.e.t.) (p)	4 (4)
(Denmark) Nordsjælland	4 (3)

Final
30 August
(Italy) Roma	5
(Czech Republic) Sparta Prague	1
Third place
30 August
(Kazakhstan) Aktobe	2
(Denmark) Nordsjælland	4

===== Semi-finals =====
27 August 2025
15:00

Roma (Italy)	2–0	(Kazakhstan) Aktobe
Pandini 40'; Galli 41'	Report

Stadion SK Prosek, Prague
Attendance: 98
Referee: Louise Thompson (Northern Ireland)

27 August 2025
17:00

Sparta Prague (Czech Republic)	4–4 (a.e.t.)	(Denmark) Nordsjælland
Bergford 14', 33', 54'; Khýrová 26'	Report	Walter 46'; Wisnewski 67'; Engsig-Karup 72'; Stárová 89' (o.g.)
Penalties
Bartoňová (penalty scored); Hansen (penalty missed); Stárová (penalty scored); Rancová (penalty scored); Sonntagová (penalty scored)	4–3	(penalty scored) Larsen; (penalty missed) Knudsen; (penalty scored) Scheuer; (penalty scored) Walter; (penalty missed) Wisnewski

Stadion Letná, Prague
Attendance: 812
Referee: Milica Milovanović (Serbia)

===== Third-place play-off =====
30 August 2025
15:00

Nordsjælland (Denmark)	4–2	(Kazakhstan) Aktobe
Larsen 5', 53'; Højer 25'; Walter 59'	Report	Zhumabaikyzy 39'; Litvinenko 50' (pen.)

Stadion Lokomotiva Praha, Prague
Attendance: 53
Referee: Maïka Vanderstichel (France)

===== Final =====
30 August 2025
15:00

Roma (Italy)	5–1	(Czech Republic) Sparta Prague
Haavi 30'; Di Guglielmo 52'; Giugliano 55', 72'; Pandini 79'	Report	Dědinová 87'

Stadion SK Prosek, Prague
Attendance: 407
Referee: Lotta Vuorio (Finland)

==== Tournament 3 ====
===== Bracket =====
Hosted by Inter Milan.

Semi-finals
27 August
(Iceland) Valur	1
(Portugal) Braga	3
27 August
(Norway) Brann	2
(Italy) Inter Milan	1

Final
30 August
(Portugal) Braga	0
(Norway) Brann	1
Third place
30 August
(Iceland) Valur	1
(Italy) Inter Milan	4

===== Semi-finals =====
27 August 2025
16:00

Brann (Norway)	2–1	(Italy) Inter Milan
Zomers 13'; Gaupset 56'	Report	Vilhjálmsdóttir 7'

Youth Development Training Center, Milan
Attendance: 404
Referee: Emily Heaslip (England)

27 August 2025
20:30

Valur (Iceland)	1–3	(Portugal) Braga
Lee Rhodes 73'	Report	Hlynsdóttir 6' (o.g.); Lewis 29'; Van de Ven 90+1' (pen.)

Youth Development Training Center, Milan
Attendance: 42
Referee: Voĺha Blockaja (Belarus)

===== Third-place play-off =====
30 August 2025
11:00

Valur (Iceland)	1–4	(Italy) Inter Milan
Friðriksdóttir 49'	Report	Bugeja 31'; Magull 36'; Polli 41'; Detruyer 85'

Youth Development Training Center, Milan
Attendance: 205
Referee: Angelika Söder (Germany)

===== Final =====
30 August 2025
17:00

Brann (Norway)	1–0	(Portugal) Braga
Arnardóttir 68' (o.g.)	Report

Youth Development Training Center, Milan
Attendance: 96
Referee: Miriama Bočková (Slovakia)

==== Tournament 4 ====
===== Bracket =====
Hosted by Austria Wien.

Semi-finals
27 August
(Scotland) Glasgow City	0
Austria Wien	2

Final
30 August
(Belarus) FC Minsk	0
Austria Wien	3

===== Semi-finals =====
27 August 2025
19:00

Glasgow City (Scotland)	0–2	Austria Wien
	Report	Schiechtl 49'; Olsen 90+3'

Franz Horr Stadium, Vienna
Attendance: 2,240
Referee: Aleksandra Česen (Slovenia)

===== Final =====
30 August 2025
14:00

FC Minsk (Belarus)	0–3	Austria Wien
	Report	Strode 9', 60' (pen.); Wenninger 45'

Franz Horr Stadium, Vienna
Attendance: 1,024
Referee: Sabina Bolić (Croatia)

== Third qualifying round ==
=== Seeding ===
The draw for the third qualifying round was held on 31 August 2025.

A total of 18 teams competed in the third round qualifying. Seeding of teams was based on their 2025 UEFA club coefficients, with four seeded and unseeded teams in the Champions Path and five of each in the League Path. Teams were drawn into two-legged-ties, where the first drawn team played the first leg at home and teams from the same association could not be drawn against each other.

The winners of the ties advanced to the league phase. The losers were transferred to the 2025–26 UEFA Women's Europa Cup second qualifying round.

Champions Path
Seeded	Unseeded
(Austria) St. Pölten; (Netherlands) Twente; (Norway) Vålerenga; (Ukraine) Vorskla Poltava	(Hungary) Ferencváros; (Denmark) Fortuna Hjørring; (Belgium) OH Leuven; (Poland) GKS Katowice

League Path
Seeded	Unseeded
(Spain) Real Madrid; (Italy) Roma; (Sweden) BK Häcken; (Norway) Brann; (France) Paris FC	(England) Manchester United; (Spain) Atlético Madrid; (Germany) Eintracht Frankfurt; (Portugal) Sporting CP; Austria Wien

==== Summary ====
The first legs were played on 11 September, and the second legs were played on 18 September 2025. The winners of the ties advanced to the league phase.

Third qualifying round
Team 1	Agg.	Team 2	1st leg	2nd leg
Champions Path
Vålerenga (Norway)	5–1	(Hungary) Ferencváros	3–0	2–1
Vorskla Poltava (Ukraine)	0–2	(Belgium) OH Leuven	0–2	0–0
St. Pölten (Austria)	5–2	(Denmark) Fortuna Hjørring	3–1	2–1
GKS Katowice (Poland)	1–8	(Netherlands) Twente	0–4	1–4
League Path
BK Häcken (Sweden)	2–3	(Spain) Atlético Madrid	1–1	1–2 (a.e.t.)
Paris FC (France)	2–0	Austria Wien	0–0	2–0
Brann (Norway)	1–3	(England) Manchester United	1–0	0–3
Eintracht Frankfurt (Germany)	1–5	(Spain) Real Madrid	1–2	0–3
Roma (Italy)	3–2	(Portugal) Sporting CP	1–2	2–0

=== Champions Path matches ===
11 September 2025
19:00

Vålerenga (Norway)	3–0	(Hungary) Ferencváros
Sævik 52'; Kovacs 66'; Hørte 90+4'	Report

Intility Arena, Oslo
Attendance: 502
Referee: Miriama Bočková (Slovakia)
18 September 2025
16:00

Ferencváros (Hungary)	1–2	(Norway) Vålerenga
Vi. Nagy 22'	Report	Thorsnes 11' (pen.), 16'

Hévízi úti Stadion, Budapest
Attendance: 579
Referee: Iuliana Demetrescu (Romania)

Vålerenga won 5–1 on aggregate.

11 September 2025
19:30

Vorskla Poltava (Ukraine)	0–2	(Belgium) OH Leuven
	Report	Biesmans 3'; Reynders 65'

Den Dreef, Leuven, Belgium (Note: Due to the Russian invasion of Ukraine, Ukrainian teams were required to play their home matches at neutral venues until further notice. Vorskla Poltava requested the first leg to be played in Belgium, which OH Leuven agreed.)
Attendance: 747
Referee: Michaela Pachtová (Czech Republic)
18 September 2025
20:00

OH Leuven (Belgium)	0–0	(Ukraine) Vorskla Poltava
	Report

Den Dreef, Leuven
Attendance: 1,255
Referee: Silvia Gasperotti (Italy)

OH Leuven won 2–0 on aggregate.

11 September 2025
19:30

St. Pölten (Austria)	3–1	(Denmark) Fortuna Hjørring
Brunold 20', 79'; Mattner-Trembleau 71'	Report	Nagy 87' (o.g.)

NV Arena, Sankt Pölten
Attendance: 802
Referee: Hristiyana Guteva (Bulgaria)
18 September 2025
18:00

Fortuna Hjørring (Denmark)	1–2	(Austria) St. Pölten
Ogochuckwu 58'	Report	Klein 5' (pen.); Elmore 53'

Hjørring Stadium, Hjørring
Attendance: 956
Referee: Olatz Rivera Olmedo (Spain)

St. Pölten won 5–2 on aggregate.

11 September 2025
18:00

GKS Katowice (Poland)	0–4	(Netherlands) Twente
	Report	Proost 34'; Tuin 63'; Ravensbergen 68'; Roord 90'

Arena Katowice, Katowice
Attendance: 1,802
Referee: Franziska Wildfeuer (Germany)
18 September 2025
19:00

Twente (Netherlands)	4–1	(Poland) GKS Katowice
Roord 14', 43'; Van Ginkel 21'; Te Brake 90+3'	Report	Hmírová 63' (pen.)

Sportpark Schreurserve, Enschede
Attendance: 623
Referee: Tess Olofsson (Sweden)

Twente won 8–1 on aggregate.

=== League Path matches ===
11 September 2025
19:00

BK Häcken (Sweden)	1–1	(Spain) Atlético Madrid
Schröder 86'	Report	Luany 17'

Bravida Arena, Gothenburg
Attendance: 3,673
Referee: Ivana Projkovska (North Macedonia)
18 September 2025
19:00

Atlético Madrid (Spain)	2–1 (a.e.t.)	(Sweden) BK Häcken
Luany 90+10' (pen.); Jensen 93'	Report	Anvegård 38'

Centro Deportivo Wanda Alcalá de Henares, Madrid
Attendance: 1,200
Referee: Maria Sole Ferrieri Caputi (Italy)

Atlético Madrid won 3–2 on aggregate.

11 September 2025
19:00

Paris FC (France)	0–0	Austria Wien
	Report

Stade Jean-Bouin, Paris
Attendance: 1,486
Referee: Shona Shukrula (Netherlands)
18 September 2025
19:45

Austria Wien	0–2	(France) Paris FC
	Report	Mateo 67', 73'

Franz Horr Stadium, Vienna
Attendance: 3,004
Referee: Ewa Augustyn (Poland)

Paris FC won 2–0 on aggregate.

11 September 2025
19:00

Brann (Norway)	1–0	(England) Manchester United
Stenevik 77'	Report

Brann Stadion, Bergen
Attendance: 16,019
Referee: Michalina Diakow (Poland)
18 September 2025
20:00 (19:00 UTC+1)

Manchester United (England)	3–0	(Norway) Brann
Terland 9', 13', 62'	Report

Leigh Sports Village, Leigh
Attendance: 2,972
Referee: Marta Huerta de Aza (Spain)

Manchester United won 3–1 on aggregate.

11 September 2025
19:00

Eintracht Frankfurt (Germany)	1–2	(Spain) Real Madrid
Anyomi 45'	Report	Angeldahl 13'; Bruun 35'

Stadion am Brentanobad, Frankfurt
Attendance: 5,569
Referee: Kirsty Dowle (England)
18 September 2025
20:00

Real Madrid (Spain)	3–0	(Germany) Eintracht Frankfurt
Feller 9'; Bruun 34'; Caicedo 60'	Report

Alfredo Di Stéfano, Madrid
Attendance: 1,204
Referee: Ivana Martinčić (Croatia)

Real Madrid won 5–1 on aggregate.

11 September 2025
20:30

Roma (Italy)	1–2	(Portugal) Sporting CP
Di Guglielmo 23'	Report	Santiago 90+2'; Encarnação 90+7'

Stadio Tre Fontane, Rome
Attendance: 1,371
Referee: Frida Klarlund (Denmark)
18 September 2025
17:30 (16:30 UTC+1)

Sporting CP (Portugal)	0–2	(Italy) Roma
	Report	Barron 45+6' (o.g.); Bergamaschi 62'

Estádio Municipal de Rio Maior, Santarém
Attendance: 989
Referee: Katalin Kulcsár (Hungary)

Roma won 3–2 on aggregate.
