= Macy Schultz =

American soccer player (born 2000)

Personal information
- Full name: Macy Ruth Schultz
- Date of birth: December 28, 2000 (age 25)
- Height: 5 ft 10 in (1.78 m)
- Positions: Right back; winger

Team information
- Current team: HB Køge
- Number: 3

Youth career
- Colorado Storm
- Real Colorado

College career
Years	Team	Apps	(Gls)
2019–2022	Texas Tech Red Raiders	73	(14)
2023–2024	Arkansas Razorbacks	21	(1)

Senior career*
Years	Team	Apps	(Gls)
2025	Northern Colorado Rain	3	(5)
2025–	HB Køge	34	(2)
- * Club domestic league appearances and goals as of October 24, 2026

Macy Ruth Schultz (born December 28, 2000) is an American professional soccer player who plays as a right back for A-Liga club HB Køge. She played college soccer for the Texas Tech Red Raiders and the Arkansas Razorbacks.

== Early life ==
Schultz grew up in Timnath, Colorado. She began playing soccer at age four and also practiced gymnastics until she was nine. She played club soccer for the Colorado Storm before moving to DA club Real Colorado. She committed to play college soccer for the Texas Tech Red Raiders during her freshman year at Fossil Ridge High School.

== College career ==
Schultz appeared in all 22 games and scored 3 goals for the Texas Tech Red Raiders as a freshman in 2019, earning Big 12 Conference all-freshman honors. She scored 3 goals in 12 appearances as a sophomore in 2020, a shortened season due to the COVID-19 pandemic, then scored 4 goals in 20 appearances in her junior year in 2021. In her senior year in 2022, she started all 19 games and scored 4 goals. She then transferred to play for the Arkansas Razorbacks but missed her first season there due to injury. She played in all 24 games and scored 1 goal for the Razorbacks in 2024.

== Club career ==
Schultz joined the National Women's Soccer League (NWSL)'s Chicago Stars as a non-roster invitee in the 2025 preseason. Later that year, she spent the summer with the Northern Colorado Rain of the Women's Premier Soccer League (WPSL).

On July 14, 2025, it was announced that Schultz had signed her first professional contract with Danish club HB Køge. She made her professional debut on August 12, coming off the bench to score the last goal in a season-opening 3–1 victory over OB Q. During her first year, she gained attention for executing flip throws, something she had done since she was young though a rarity in professional soccer. She established herself as the starting right back by the end of her rookie season as HB Køge won their fourth league championship. On May 16, 2026, she scored the first two goals in the Danish Women's Cup final against Nordsjælland and was named the most valuable player of the 4–1 victory, HB Køge's first cup title.

On August 5, 2026, Schultz scored her first continental goal in a 4–1 win over Riga as HB Køge began their successful UEFA Women's Champions League qualifying campaign. She made her Champions League debut on September 22, playing the full match in a tight 1–0 loss to Arsenal. On October 1, she scored her first Champions League goal with a backheel finish to open the scoring in a 5–1 win over Servette Chênois, HB Køge's first-ever win in the competition.

== Honors and awards ==
Arkansas Razorbacks

- Southeastern Conference: 2023

HB Køge

- A-Liga: 2025–26
- Danish Women's Cup: 2025–26

Individual

- Big 12 Conference all-freshman team: 2019
- Danish Women's Cup player of the tournament: 2025–26
