= Marigonë Tahiri =

Kosovan footballer (born 1999)

Marigone Tahiri
Personal information
- Date of birth: 25 February 1999 (age 27)
- Place of birth: Dramjak, Ferizaj, Kosovo
- Position: Midfielder

Team information
- Current team: Ünye
- Number: 8

Senior career*
Years	Team	Apps	(Gls)
- Mitrovica
2025–	Ünye	2	(0)

International career
	Kosovo	18	(0)
- * Club domestic league appearances and goals as of 5 October 2025

Marigone Tahiri (born 25 February 1999) is a Kosovan footballer who plays as a midfielder for Ünye in the Turkish Women's Super League, and the Kosovo national team.

== Club career ==
In her country, Tahiri played for Mitrovica. She took part at the 2025–26 UEFA Women's Champions League qualifying rounds.

In September 2025, she moved to Turkey, and signed with Ünye to play in the Turkish Super League.

== International career ==
Tahiri is a member of Kosovo women's national football team. She last appeared in two matches of 2025 UEFA Women's Nations League C Group 6.

== See also ==
- List of Kosovo women's international footballers
