= Latvian Women's Cup =

Sieviešu futbola kauss
- Organiser(s): Latvian Football Federation
- Founded: 2014
- Region: Latvia
- Related competitions: Latvian Women's League
- Current champions: Riga FC Women
- Most championships: Rīgas Futbola skola (6 titles)
- 2026 Latvian Women's Cup

The Latvian Women's Cup (Latvian: Sieviešu futbola kauss) is the annual cup competition of women's football teams in Latvia.

== Format ==
The competition is a knockout (single elimination) tournament.

== List of finals ==
The list of finals: No editions held up to 2013.

Season	Champion	Result	Runner-Up
2014	Rīgas Futbola skola	5–1	FK Liepāja
2015	Rīgas Futbola skola	5–1	FK Liepāja
2016	Rīgas Futbola skola	8–0	Rēzeknes BJSS - VRS Optimists-R
2017	Rīgas Futbola skola	4–2	FK Liepāja
2018	Rīgas Futbola skola	4–2	FK Liepāja
2019	Rīgas Futbola skola	2–2 (7–5 p)	FK Dinamo Rīga
~~2020~~	Cancelled due to the COVID-19 pandemic		
2021	SFK Rīga	2–1	Liepājas Futbola skola
2022	FS Metta (women)	2–2 (6–4 p)	Liepājas Futbola skola
2023	FS Metta (women)	0–0 (5–4 p)	SFK Rīga
2024	RFS Women	1–0	Riga FC Women
2025	Riga FC Women	7–0	FK Auda Women
2026			

== See also ==
- Latvian Football Cup, men's equivalent
