= İrem Damla Şahin =

Turkish footballer (born 2000)

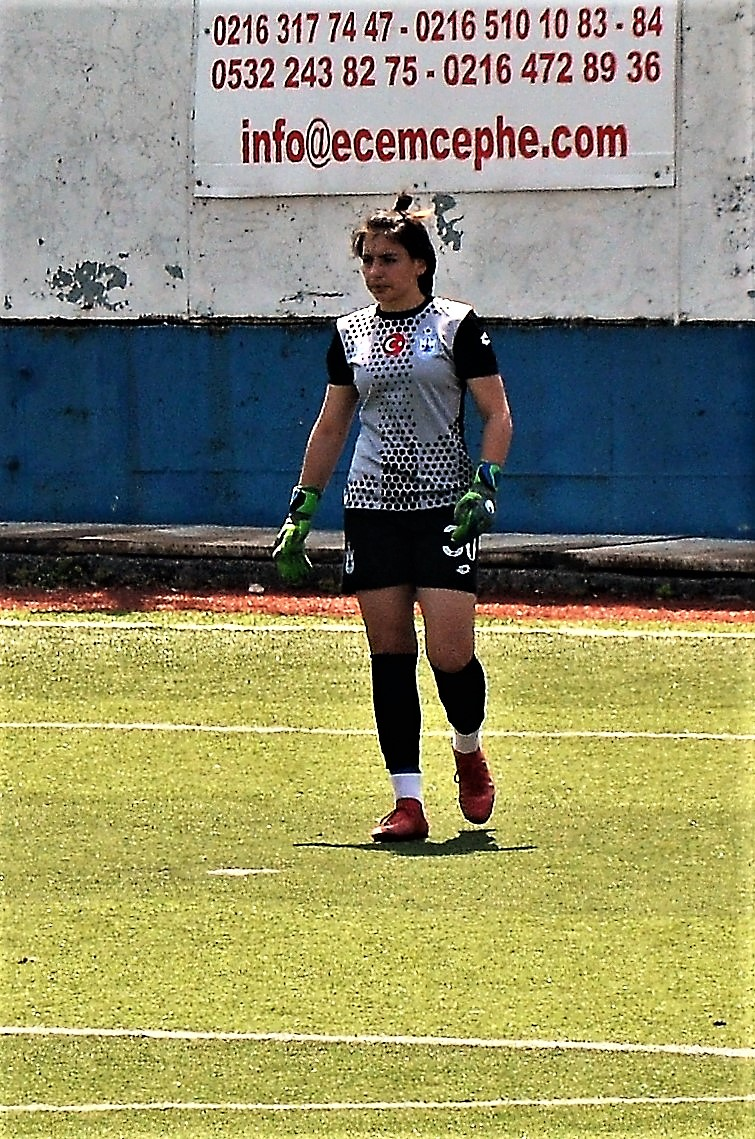
- İrem Damla Şahin of Konak Belediyespor (April 2019)

Personal information
- Date of birth: 2 February 2000 (age 26)
- Place of birth: Ordu, Turkey
- Position: Goalkeeper

Team information
- Current team: Ünye Kadın
- Number: 26

Senior career*
Years	Team	Apps	(Gls)
2015–2018	Soyaspor	50	(0)
2018–2020	Konak Bld.	12	(0)
2023–	Ünye Kadın	24	(0)

International career^{‡}
2018–2019	Turkey U-19	5	(0)
- * Club domestic league appearances and goals as of 4 May 2025 ‡ National team caps and goals as of 28 April 2019

İrem Damla Şahin (born 2 February 2000) is a Turkish women's football goalkeeper who plays in the Turkish Women's Football Super League for Ünye Kadın with jersey number 26. She was a member of the Turkey women's national U-19 team.

== Club career ==
İrem Damla Şahin obtained her license on 4 June 2015 from her hometown club Yenimahalle 52 Spor, which is also known as Soyaspor Gençlik. She debuted in the Turkish Women's Third League on 8 November 2015. Aftercapping 50 times in three seasons in her hometown Ordu, she moved to İzmir to join the First League team Konak Belediyespor in the 2018–19 season.

She was named the "Best Goalkeeper" of the Turkish Girls' Championship in 2018.

After a long break during the COVID-19 pandemic in Turkey, she joined her hometown club Ünye Kadın in the 2023-24 First League season. She capped in six matches. Her team became league champion, and was promoted to the Women's Super League.

== Internationa career ==
Şahin was admitted to the Turkey women's national under-19 football team, and debuted in the friendky match against Poland on 30 August 2018. She took part in one match of the qualifying round, and two matches of the Elite round at the 2019 UEFA Women's Under-19 Championship qualification.

== Career statistics ==
As of match played 4 May 2025.

Club	Season	League			Continental		National		Total	
Club	Season	Division	Apps	Goals	Apps	Goals	Apps	Goals	Apps	Goals
Soyaspor	2015–16	Third League	15	0	–	–	-	-	15	0
Soyaspor	2016–17	Third League	23	0	–	–	-	-	23	0
Soyaspor	2017–18	FThird League	12	0	–	–	-	-	12	0
Soyaspor	Total		50	0	–	–	-	-	50	0
Konak Bld.	2018–19	First League	5	0	-	-	5	0	10	0
Konak Bld.	2019–20	First League	7	0	-	-	0	0	7	0
Konak Bld.	Total		12	0	-	-	5	0	17	0
Ünye Kadın	2023–24	First League	6	0	-	-	0	6	0	
Ünye Kadın	2024–25	Super League	18	0	-	-	0	0	18	0
Ünye Kadın	Total		24	0	-	-	0	0	24	0
Career total			86	0	-	-	5	0	91	0

== Honours ==
=== Club ===
Turkish Women's First League

Konak Belediyespor
Third places (1): 2018–19

Ünye Gücü F.K.
Winners (1): 2023-24

=== Individual ===
- Best Goalkeeper, 2018 Turkish Girls' Championship
