= Julia Mortensen =

Faroese footballer

Personal information
- Full name: Julia Naomi Mortensen
- Date of birth: 28 September 2000 (age 26)
- Place of birth: Faroe Islands
- Height: 1.66 m (5 ft 5 in)
- Position: Midfielder

Senior career*
Years	Team	Apps	(Gls)
2017–2021	HB	68	(38)
2021–2022	AGF	9	(1)
2022–2024	AaB		
2024–	NSÍ Runavík		

International career^{‡}
- Faroe Islands
- * Club domestic league appearances and goals as of 23:51, 31 August 2019 (UTC) ‡ National team caps and goals as of 23:51, 31 August 2019 (UTC)

Julia Mortensen (born 28 September 2000) is a Faroese footballer who plays as a midfielder for AGF in the Elitedivisionen and has appeared for the Faroe Islands women's national team.

== Career ==
Mortensen has been capped for the Faroe Islands national team, appearing for the team during the UEFA Women's Euro 2021 qualifying cycle.

== International goals ==
No.	Date	Venue	Opponent	Score	Result	Competition
1.	20 February 2022	Victoria Stadium, Gibraltar	Gibraltar	1–0	1–0	Friendly
2.	6 April 2023	Stade Achille Hammerel, Luxembourg City, Luxembourg	Luxembourg	5–2	5–5	Friendly
