= Ilarja Zarka =

Albanian footballer (born 2001)

Personal information
- Date of birth: 1 October 2001 (age 25)
- Place of birth: Fier, Albania
- Height: 1.62 m (5 ft 4 in)
- Position: Midfielder

Team information
- Current team: Ünye
- Number: 25

Senior career*
Years	Team	Apps	(Gls)
2018–2022	Vllaznia	7	(0)
2025–	Ünye	28	(1)

International career^{‡}
2017	Albania U19		
2021–	Albania	16	(0)
- * Club domestic league appearances and goals as of 14 November 2026 ‡ National team caps and goals as of 9 June 2026

Ilarja Zarka (born 1 October 2001) is an Albanian professional footballer who plays as a midfielder for Ünye in the Turkish Super League and the Albania national team.

== Club career ==
Zarka played for Vllaznia in the Albanian Kategoria Superiore Femra between 2018 and 2022. During this period, her team became league champion consecutive and uninterrupted. She played in the 2018–1, 2020–21 and 2021–22 of UEFA Women's Champions League, capping in total of seven games.

She moved to Turkey in September 2025, and signed with Ünye to play in the Women's Super League. She appeared in 22 matches and scored a goal in the 2025–26 season. In September 2026, she renewed her contract for the upcoming season.

== International career ==
Zarka was invited to the Albania nationaş U19 team.

She was called up to the Albania women's national team, and debuted in the match against Armenia on 21 October 2021.

== Personal life ==
Zarka was born in Fier, Albania on 1 October 2001.

== Honours ==
Vllaznia

Kategoria Superiore Femra
Champions (4): 2018–19, 2019–2, 2020–21, 2021–22
