= Melanie Mikoy =

American soccer player (born 2000)

Personal information
- Full name: Melanie Nicole Mikoy
- Date of birth: July 21, 2000 (age 26)
- Place of birth: Atlanta, Georgia, United States
- Height: 5 ft 8 in (1.73 m)
- Position: Defender

Team information
- Current team: Ünye Gücü F.K.
- Number: 10

Youth career
- Fayetteville County HS

College career
| Years | Team | Apps | (Gls) |
| 2018–2022 | The Citadel Bulldogs | 48 | (3) |
| 2022–2023 | UC Santa Barbara Gauchos | 20 | (0) |

Senior career*
| Years | Team | Apps | (Gls) |
| 2022–2023 | Peachtree City MOBA | 12 | (0) |
| 2023–2024 | Tormenta FC | | |
| 2024– | Ünye Gücü F.K. | 1 | (0) |
- * Club domestic league appearances and goals as of September 8, 2024

Melanie Nicole Mikoy (born July 21, 2000), also known as Mel, is an American professional women's soccer defender who plays for Ünye Gücü F.K. in the Turkish Super League.

== Early years in sport ==
During her secondary education, Mikoy played for the high school soccer team. She was part of the U-15 team, which won the Southeast Conference championship.

She played for The Citadel Bulldogs during her military academy years between 2018 and 2022, where she appeared in 48 games in total, and scored three goals. In 2022, she played for the UC Santa Barbara Gauchos. She capped in 20 matches.

== Club career ==
Mikoy is 5 ft 8 in (1.73 m) tall, and plays in the defender position.

In 2022, Mikoy played for Peachtree City MOBA, appearing in 12 matches.

Mikoy joined Tormenta FC in South Georgia, which played in the USL W League in 2022.

In the beginning of September 2024, Mikoy moved to Turkey and signed with Ünye Gücü F.K., which was newly promoted to the Turkish Super League.

== Personal life ==
Melanie Nicole Mikoy was born to Debby and Bryan Mikoy in Atlanta, Georgia, United States on July 21, 2000. She has one brother who also plays soccer.

After completing the Fayetteville County High School, she attended The Citadel military academy in 2018 majoring in exercise science. In 2022, she moved to University of California, Santa Barbara.
