= Miyu Takahira =

Japanese footballer

Personal information
- Date of birth: 4 November 1999 (age 27)
- Place of birth: Fuji City, Shizuoka Prefecture, Japan
- Height: 1.66 m (5 ft 5 in)
- Position: Defender

Team information
- Current team: Riga FC Women

Senior career*
| Years | Team | Apps | (Gls) |
| 2018–2025 | MyNavi Sendai | 33 | (1) |
| 2025–2026 | Fortuna Hjørring | 15 | (0) |
| 2026– | Riga FC Women | | |

International career
| 2022– | Japan | 1 | (0) |
- * Club domestic league appearances and goals as of 16:33, 23 July 2026 (UTC)

Miyu Takahira (born 4 November 1999) is a Japanese professional footballer who plays as a defender for Latvian Women's League club Riga FC Women.

== Club career ==
Takahira made her WE League debut on 12 September 2021.

== Career statistics ==
=== International ===
| National Team | Year | Apps | Goals |
|---|---|---|---|
Japan
| Japan | 2022 | 1 | 0 |
| Total | | 1 | 0 |
