= Ünye Kadın S.K. =

Turkish women's football club

- Full name: Ünye Kadın Spor Kulübü
- Founded: 2016; 10 years ago
- Ground: Ünye District Stadium
- Coordinates: 41.12480°N 37.285659°E
- Head coach: (Turkey) Muhammet Kışla
- League: Turkish Women's Super League
- 2025–26: 9th

Ünye Kadın S.K., formerly Ünye Gücü F.K. (Turkish: Ünye Gücü Futbol Kulübü), is a Turkeish women's football club based in Ünye district of Ordu Province, northern Turkey. It was established in 2016. The team was promoted to the Turkish Women's Football Super League in 2024.

== History ==
Ünye Gücü F.K. was established as the first and only women's football club in Ünye district of Ordu in 2016. The team was entitled to play in the Turkish Women's Third League after the finals of the Turkish Junior Women's Championship. The team made their first appearance in an away match of the 2017-18 Women's Third League season against Soyaspor Gençlik on 9 December 2017.

Ünye Gücü became champion without conceding a goal in the 2021-22 Turkish Women's Second League season, and was promoted to the Women's First League.

The team was promoted to the Women's Super League following their win of the play-offs at the end of the 2023-24 Women's First League season.

İn the beginning of the 2026-27 Super League season, Safi MCL Bentonit, a cat litter producing and bentonite mining company based in Fatsa, Ordu, started the sponsorship of the club.

== Club name history ==
- Ünye Gücü Futbol Kulübü (2017–2024)
- Ünye Kadın Spor Kulübü (2024–2026)
- Safi MCL Bentonit Ünye Kadın Futbol Kulübü (2026– )

== Logo and colours ==
In 2023, the club planned to change its logo from 2016. The colours are red-white-black.

== Statistics ==
As of 14 November 2026

Season	League	Rank	Pld	W	D	L	GF	GA	GD	Pts		
2017–18	Third League Gr. 5	5	12	2	0	10	18	62	-44	6		
2018–19	Third League Gr. 13	3	10	6	4	0	22	7	+5	22		
2019–20	Third League Gr. 5	1	14	13	1	0	51	5	+46	40		
2020–21	Women's Second and Third Leagues were not played											
2021–22	Second League Gr. B	1	10	10	0	0	67	0	+67	30		
2022–23	First League	7	24	9	3	12	34	39	-5	30		
2023–24	First League Gr. A	1	16	11	4	1	43	10	+33	37		
2023–24	Play-offs	1	10	7	2	1	23	5	+18	23		
2024–25	Super League	10	26	6	5	15	47	58	+10	23		
2025–26	Super League	9	30	13	4	13	52	48	4	+4	0	43
2026–27	Super League	11	10 (Note: Season in progress)	3	3	4	15	14	+1	12		
Legend: Green marks a season followed by promotion, red a season followed by relegation.

== Current squad ==
As of 8 November 2026

- Head coach: (Turkey) Muhammet Kişla

Note: Flags indicate national team as defined under FIFA eligibility rules; some limited exceptions apply. Players may hold more than one non-FIFA nationality.

No.	Pos.	Nation	Player
1	GK	TTO	Klil Keshwar
55	GK	TUR	Zeynep Koyun
99	GK	TUR	Yağmur Yavuz
2	DF	KOS	Rrezona Ramadani
5	DF	TUR	Suhde Nur Arpacı
6	DF	ALB	Sara Maliqi
19	DF	TUR	Nagehan Akşan
4	MF	TUR	Selin Yılmaz
8	MF	NGR	Precious Christopher
11	MF	TUR	Elif Kesgin

No.	Pos.	Nation	Player
17	MF	TUR	Yaren Çolak
23	MF	NGR	Kafayat Shittu
25	MF	ALB	Ilarja Zarka
30	MF	TUR	Nazmiye Aytop
7	FW	TUN	Mariem Houij
10	FW	TUR	Berra Bayraktar
18	FW	GHA	Mukarama Abdulai
21	FW	TUR	Ceren Güzelhan
27	FW	GHA	Philomena Abakah

== Former notable players ==
Albania

- Ezmiralda Franja

Azerbaijan

- Ayshan Ahmadova
- Mislina Gözükara
- Vusala Hajiyeva
- Milana Rahimova

Ghana

- Princess Owusu
- Fredrica Torkudzor

Kosovo

- Marigonë Tahiri

North Macedonia

- Lenche Andreevska
- Ulza Maksuti

Nigeria

- Joy Bokiri

Pakistan

- Aqsa Mushtaq

Serbia

- Anđela Kričak

Turkey

- İrem Damla Şahin

United States

- Melanie Mikoy

== Honours ==
'Champions (3):

- 2019–20 Turkish Women's Third League
- 2021–22 Turkish Women's Second League
- 2023–24 Turkish Women's First League
