= Milana Rahimova =

Azerbaijani association football player (born2004)

Personal information
- Date of birth: 29 April 2004 (age 22)
- Place of birth: Baku, Azerbaijan
- Height: 1.71 m (5 ft 7 1/2 in)
- Position: Defender

Team information
- Current team: Ünye Kadın S.K.
- Number: 23

Senior career*
Years	Team	Apps	(Gls)
2018–2019	Keşla-2		
2021–2022	8-iOEUGiM Women		
2022–2023	Nuhspor		
2023	Şırnak Bld 72		
2023–2024	Neftçi		
2024–	Ünye Kadın	18	(0)

International career
- Azerbaijan U19
- Azerbaijan
- * Club domestic league appearances and goals as of 4 May 2025

Milana Rahimova (Azerbaijani: Milana Rəhimova; born 29 April 2004) is an Azerbaijani women's football defender who plays for Ünye Kadın in the Turkish Super League. She is a member of the Azerbaijan national team.

== Personal life ==
Milana Rahimova was born in Baku, Azerbaijan on 29 April 2004.

== Club career ==
Rahimova plays in the defender position.

She played for Nuhspor in her country in the 2022–23 season, and appeared in 11 matches.

The next season, she transferred to Neftçi PFK.

In August 2024, Rahimova moved to Turkey, and signed with the newly to the Turkish Super League promomoted club Ünye Kadın.

== International career ==
Rahimova is part of the Azerbaijan national team, at the UEFA Women's Euro 2025 qualifying.
