= Kumba Brima =

Sierra Leonean footballer (born 2003)

Personal information
- Full name: Kumba Zaina Brima
- Date of birth: 2 January 2002 (age 24)
- Place of birth: Sierra Leone
- Height: 1.77 m (5 ft 10 in)
- Position: Forward

Team information
- Current team: Alavés

Senior career*
| Years | Team | Apps | (Gls) |
- Mogbwemo Queens
| –2025 | FC Kallon | | |
| 2025–2026 | Riga | | (42) |
| 2026– | Alavés | 5 | (1) |

International career
- Sierra Leone
- * Club domestic league appearances and goals as of 26 September 2026

Kumba Zaina Brima (born 2 January 2002) is a Sierra Leonean professional footballer who plays as a forward for Alavés.

== Club career ==
Brima played for Mogbwemo Queens, where she played in the CAF Women's Champions League and helped the club win the league title. Following her stint there, she signed for FC Kallon, where she scored thirteen goals in her first seven league appearances during the 2024–25 season.

Subsequently, she signed for Latvian side Riga in 2025, where she played in the UEFA Women's Champions League and helped the club win the league title. Ahead of the 2026–27 season, she signed for Spanish outfit Alavés. On 30 August 2026, she debuted and scored her first goal for the club during a 2–0 home win over Valencia in the league.

== International career ==
Brima is a Sierra Leone international. During the spring of 2024, she played for the Sierra Leone women's national football team at the 2024 Women's Day Cup.

== Personal life ==
Brima was born on 2 January 2002. Born in Sierra Leone, she has been nicknamed "Pele".
