= Hapoel Katamon Jerusalem F.C. (women) =

Hapoel Katamon Jerusalem
- מרכז|260px
- Full name: Hapoel Katamon Jerusalem Football Club מועדון כדורגל הפועל קטמון ירושלים
- Founded: 2011
- Ground: Emeq HaArazim, Jerusalem
- Capacity: 400
- Chairman: Yotam Carmon
- Manager: Tsach Shamroni
- League: Women's Premier League
- 2025–26: Champions
- Website: https://www.hjfc.co.il/women-team

Hapoel Katamon Jerusalem F.C. (Hebrew: הפועל קטמון ירושלים) is an Israeli women's football club from Jerusalem competing in the Israeli First League and the Israeli Women's Cup.

== History ==
=== Early Years and Youth Department ===
While an initial women's team existed briefly under the Hapoel Jerusalem umbrella during the 1998/1999 season, it disbanded shortly after. The modern foundation of the club began in the 2011/2012 season, when the fan-owned club Hapoel Katamon Jerusalem established its girls' and youth departments.

In October 2015, the club announced it was renaming its girls' team to "Hapoel Katamon Jerusalem – Shira" in memory of Shira Banki, a 16-year-old girl who was murdered during the Jerusalem gay pride parade earlier that year. The youth department saw significant success, winning the State Cup (Girls) in 2015/16 and 2018/19, and the National Championship (Youth) in 2016/17.

=== Establishment of the Senior Team and Rapid Rise ===
At the start of the 2020/2021 season, the club officially formed its senior women's team, which joined the third-tier Liga Artzit. Their inaugural match was a dramatic State Cup victory over Hapoel Tel Aviv, won on penalties. Under coach Moti Ohayon, the team finished second and earned promotion in its first year of existence.

The following season (2021/2022) in the second-tier Liga Leumit, the team continued its momentum under coach Zohar Kaminsky, finishing second again and securing a historic promotion to the Israeli First Division (Ligat Ha'Al) within just two years of its founding.

=== Success in the Top Flight and Professional Growth ===
In its debut season in the top flight (2022/23), Hapoel Katamon Jerusalem established itself as a title contender, finishing as runners-up. The 2023/2024 season marked a major milestone as the club won its first-ever major trophy, the Athena Cup (League Cup). That year also saw the release of "Alufot", a documentary series on Kan 11 that followed the team's journey.

In 2024/25, the team reached the State Cup final for the first time and played its first-ever match at Teddy Stadium, Jerusalem's premier football venue.

=== 2025/2026: Historical Championship ===
The 2025/26 season served as the club's ultimate breakthrough. After finishing as runners-up for three consecutive seasons in the top flight, Hapoel Katamon Jerusalem secured its first-ever Israeli League Championship. This title solidified the club's position as a powerhouse in Israeli women's football and marked a historic achievement for the fan-owned club, becoming the first Jerusalem-based team to win the women's national title.

== Honours ==
Israeli Premier League (1)

- 2025–26

Athena Cup (1)

- 2023–24
