= Ugnė Šmitaitė =

Lithuanian footballer

Personal information
- Date of birth: 10 September 1994 (age 32)
- Position: Defender

International career^{‡}
Years	Team	Apps	(Gls)
- Lithuania
- ‡ National team caps and goals as of 19:43, 30 August 2019 (UTC)

Ugnė Šmitaitė (born 10 September 1994) is a Lithuanian football referee and former player who played as a defender and has appeared for the Lithuania women's national team.

== Career ==
Šmitaitė has been capped for the Lithuania national team, appearing for the team during the 2019 FIFA Women's World Cup qualifying cycle.
