= Anđela Kričak =

Serbian footballer (born 1999)

Personal information
- Date of birth: 13 February 1999 (age 27)
- Place of birth: Kruševac, Serbia
- Height: 1.57 m (5 ft 2 in)
- Position: Midfielder

Team information
- Current team: Swieqi United
- Number: 19

Youth career
- 2013–2015: Napredak Kruševac

College career
Years	Team	Apps	(Gls)
2019–2022	East Tennessee State Buccaneers	45	(3)

Senior career*
Years	Team	Apps	(Gls)
2018–2019	Spartak Subotica		
2023–2024	San Ġwann		
2024–2024	Ünye Kadın	9	(0)

International career^{‡}
- Serbia U17
- Serbia U19
- * Club domestic league appearances and goals ‡ National team caps and goals as of 22 December 2024

Anđela Kričak (Serbian Cyrillic: Анђела Кричак; born 13 February 1999), also known as Andjela "Nadja" Kricak, is a Serbian women's football midfielder who plays for Ünye Gücü F.K. in the Turkish Super League. She was part of the Serbia women's national U17 and U19 teams.

== Early years in sport ==
Kricak started playing football around the age of eight or nine. Influenced by her brother, she followed him, who entered a newly founded local football club. In her early years, she played mostly with boys.

Between 2013 and 2015, she played for the local club ŽFK Napredak Kruševac. In the 2018–19 season, she was with ŽFK Spartak Subotica, and took part at the 2018–19 UEFA Women's Champions League for her team.

From 2019 to 2022, she played in the United States for the college team East Tennessee State Buccaneers women's soccer. She scored three goals in 45 matches played in total.

== Club career ==
Kricak is 1.57 m (5 ft 2 in) tall, and plays in the midfielder position.

After returning to Europe, she joined San Ġwann F.C. in the Maltese Women's League. During this time, she was tasked with the coaching of the club's U16 team.

End July 2024, Kricak moved to Turkey, and signed with the newly to the Turkish Super League promoted club Ünye Gücü F.K.

== International career ==
Kricak was part of the Serbia U17 and Serbia U19 national teams.

== Personal life ==
Anđela Kričak, in Romanized form Andjela "Nadja" Kricak, was born in Kruševac, Serbia on 13 February 1999.

After completing her high school education, she went to the United States, and attended East Tennessee State University in Johnson City, Tennessee for the study of Sports science majoring in sports coaching.
