= Líf Joostdóttir van Bemmel =

Icelandic footballer (born 2öö7)

Personal information
- Date of birth: 6 October 2007 (age 19)
- Position: Defender

Team information
- Current team: Breiðablik

Senior career*
Years	Team	Apps	(Gls)
2023–	Breiðablik	38	(9)
2023–2024	→ Augnablik	21	(8)

International career^{‡}
2023	Iceland U-17	6	(1)
2023–2024	Iceland U-18	7	(0)
2024–	Iceland U-19	22	(4)
2025–	Iceland U-23	1	(0)
2026–	Iceland	1	(0)
- * Club domestic league appearances and goals as of 28 September 2026 ‡ National team caps and goals as of 15 October 2026

Líf Joostdóttir van Bemmel (born 2007) is an Icelandic footballer. She is a member of Besta deild kvenna club Breiðablik and plays internationally for Iceland.

She debuted with Breiðablik in 2023 while also playing on a loan with Augnablik in the 2. deild kvenna the same season. She scored her first two Besta deild kvenna goals in a 7–1 victory against Fram in April 2025.

== Career statistics ==
=== International ===
As of match played 13 October 2026

Appearances and goals by national team and year
National team	Year	Apps	Goals
Iceland	2026	1	0
Total		1	0

== Personal life ==
Líf is the daughter of Icelander Helga Bjarnarson and Dutchman Joost van Bemmel.
