= Andrea Bogorová =

Slovak footballer

Personal information
- Date of birth: 27 February 2000 (age 26)
- Position: Forward

Team information
- Current team: Spartak Myjava

Senior career*
Years	Team	Apps	(Gls)
2019-2020	Spartak Myjava		
2020-2021	SKV Altenmarkt		
2021	Austria Wien	1	(1)
2021–	Spartak Myjava	80	(157)

International career^{‡}
2015–2016	Slovakia U17	6	(3)
2017–2019	Slovakia U19	8	(3)
2020–	Slovakia	7	(1)
- * Club domestic league appearances and goals ‡ National team caps and goals as of 30 August 2025

Andrea Bogorová (born 27 February 2000) is a Slovak footballer who plays as a forward for I. liga žien club Spartak Myjava and the Slovakia women's national team. Known for her finishing skills, she is considered one of the best Slovak women footballers.

In 2022, she returned to Myjava, where she would win the player of the season award the next season after contributing 49 goals. She was also included in that season's team of the year, becoming the first player to win it three times in a row.

== Club career ==
=== Spartak Myjava ===
Bogorová played for Spartak Myjava until 2021, then transferred to Austria Vienna for six months before returning to Spartak Myjava in January 2022. She won the top senior goal scorer award in the 2023/24 season, scoring 49 goals. She was also included in the league's Team of the Year after winning the cup and league title with Myjava. Bogorová scored a goal in an 8–0 win over Košice in the cup final. She scored the winning goal in a 2–1 win against Swieqi United FC, scoring in the 101st minute to help her team advance to the second qualifying round of the Women's Champions League.

== International career ==
Bogorová scored a goal in the 22nd minute of her first international match for the WU15 team and scored twice in her first match for the WU17 team. She became the second-highest scorer behind the WU19 team with 14 goals and the most efficient player with a 53.8% scorer, having scored fourteen times in 26 matches.

Bogorová made her senior debut against Mexico on 8 March 2020 at the 2020 Cyprus Women's Cup. She scored her first senior international goal in July 2024: as a substitute she scored in the 89th minute of a UEFA Women's Euro 2025 qualifying League B match against Israel to ensure the game, held at a neutral venue in Budaörs, Hungary, finished as a 2–2 draw.

== Career statistics ==
=== International ===
No.	Date	Venue	Opponent	Score	Result	Competition
1.	16 July 2024	Budaörsi Városi Stadium, Budaörs, Hungary	Israel	2–2	2–2	UEFA Women's Euro 2025 qualifying
