= FCV Farul Constanța (women) =

- Founded: 2022; 4 years ago
- Ground: Central
- Capacity: 4,554
- Head coach: Raluca Sârghe
- League: Liga I
- 2025–26: 1st (champions)
Home colours	Away colours	Third colours

FCV Farul Constanța is a women's association football team from Constanța, Romania. It forms part of the sports club FCV Farul Constanța.

== History ==
The women's section of FCV Farul Constanța was founded in 2022 under the ownership of Gheorghe Hagi, with the aim of establishing one of the leading women's football clubs in Romania. The club entered the Liga II in the 2022–23 season and won promotion to the Liga I in its inaugural campaign.

In its first season in the top flight, Farul won the 2023–24 Liga I title, ending the dominance of FCU Olimpia Cluj. The club retained the championship in 2024–25, and again in 2025–26, qualifying for the UEFA Women's Champions League.

== Squad ==
As of 25 May 2026

Note: Flags indicate national team as defined under FIFA eligibility rules; some limited exceptions apply. Players may hold more than one non-FIFA nationality.

No.	Pos.	Nation	Player
2	DF	ROU	Andra Maria Mihăescu
4	DF	ROU	Cristina Botojel
6	DF	ROU	Ana Maria Stanciu
9	FW	ROU	Andreea Pînzariu
10	MF	ROU	Adriana Istrate
11	FW	ROU	Claudia Chiper
12	GK	ROU	Adelina Marina Voinescu
13	FW	ROU	Sara Ioana Miron
14	FW	BUL	Dimitra Ivanova
15	FW	ROU	Angelina Geambazu
17	MF	ROU	Magda Fudulache
18	DF	ROU	Antonia Bratu
19	MF	CIV	Estelle Gnaly

No.	Pos.	Nation	Player
21	DF	COD	Enez Mudeizi Mango
22	FW	ROU	Alessandra Bortoș
23	DF	ROU	Ioana Stancu
24	MF	ROU	Maria Cristea
25	MF	ROU	Delia Stînjinel
27	DF	BUL	Nikoleta Boycheva
28	DF	ROU	Jaqueline Craiovan
30	MF	ROU	Violeta Bogos
33	GK	ROU	Rebeca Achiței
44	FW	ROU	Ioana Bălăceanu
77	FW	ROU	Tabita Croitoru
99	GK	KEN	Lilian Onyango

== Current staff ==
As of 25 May 2026

Coaching staff
Raluca Sârghe	Head coach
Marius Sun	Assistant coach
Emil Dobre	Goalkeeper coach
Dorel Zaharia	Manager
Rebecca Battista	Team manager

== Honours ==
- Liga I:
  - Winners (3): 2023–24, 2024–25, 2025–26
- Liga II:
  - Winners (1): 2022–23
- Cupa României:
  - Runners-up (1): 2024–25
