= Stade Achille Hammerel =

Football stadium in Luxembourg City, Luxembourg

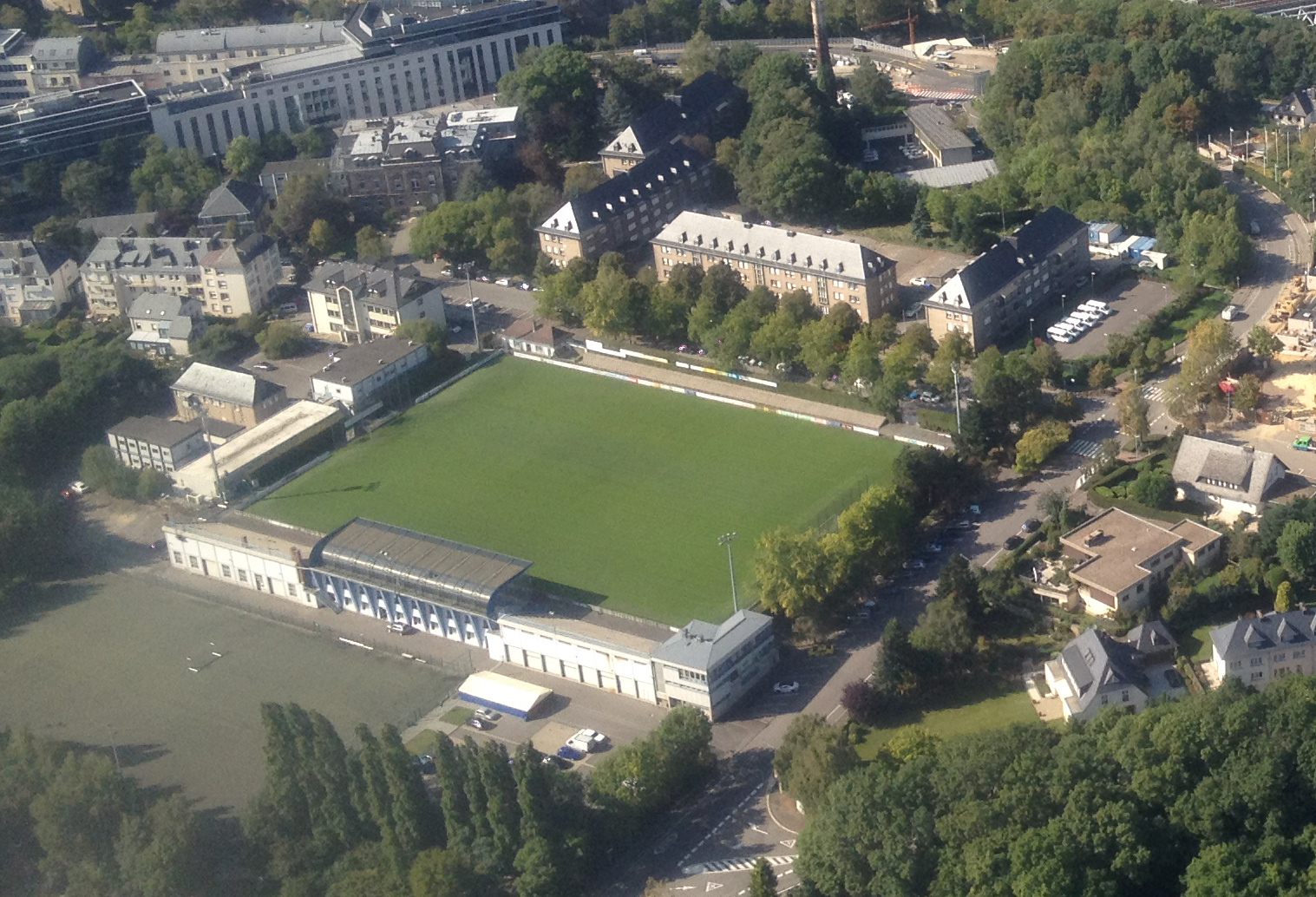
- Stade Achille Hammerel, Aerial view, Luxembourg City
- Interactive map of Stade Achille Hammerel
- Full name: Stade Achille Hammerel
- Location: Luxembourg City, Luxembourg
- Coordinates: 49°36′17″N 06°08′25″E
- Capacity: 5,814
- Surface: grass

Tenant
- Racing FC Union Luxembourg

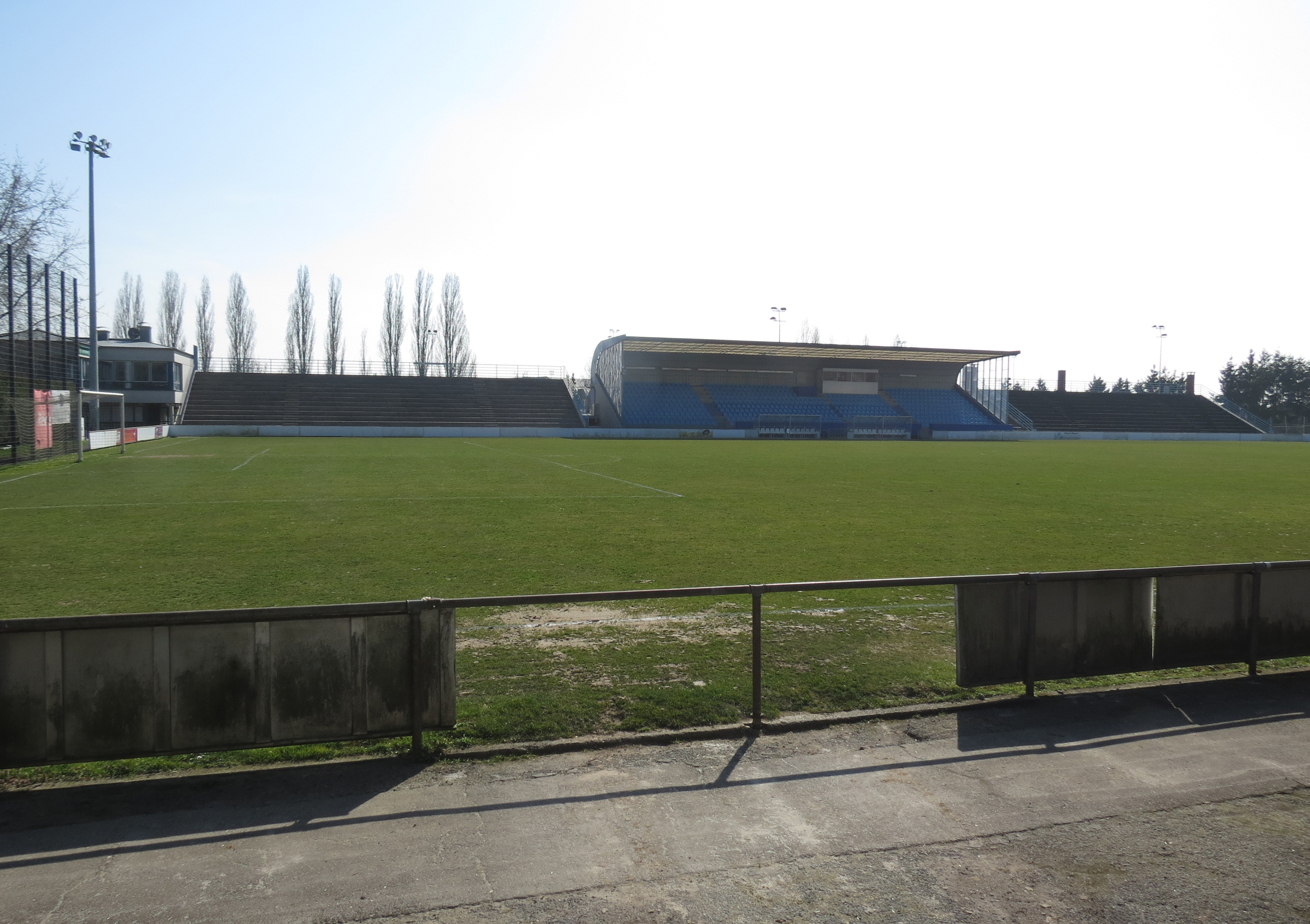
Stade Achille Hammerel in 2014

Stade Achille Hammerel is a football stadium in North Bonnevoie-Verlorenkost, a district of Luxembourg City, in southern Luxembourg. It is currently the home stadium of Racing FC Union Luxembourg. Until 2005, it was the home of Union Luxembourg. The stadium has a capacity of 5,814.

Deep Purple played at the stadium on 6 June 1971 to a crowd of around 4,000, during the first ever rock festival in Luxembourg.
