= Riga FC (women) =

Latvian football club

Riga FC Women
- Full name: Riga Football Club; Riga FC, SIA
- Founded: 14 February 2024; 2 years ago
- Ground: Mežaparks Sport Village
- Capacity: 500
- Chairman: Aleksandrs Proņins
- Manager: Vadims Burlačuks
- League: Women's Virslīga
- 2026: Women's Virslīga, Champions of 7
- Website: rigafc.lv
Home colours	Away colours	Third colours

Riga Women's Football Club, commonly referred to as Riga FC Women, is a Latvian women's football club, founded in 2024. The club is based at the Mežaparks Sport Village in Riga. Since 2024, the club has been playing in the Women's Virslīga, the highest tier of the Latvian women's football league system.

== History ==
The club was officially registered in February 2024.

In 2024, the Latvian Igors Kļosovs was appointed as first ever head coach in teams history. In their debut season team won Women's Virslīga title

In 2025 team debuted in UEFA Women's Champions League. In first qualifying rounds semi-final team won 4-1 against Flora from Estonia, but lost in final 1-2 against Racing Union from Luxembourg. After UEFA Women's Champions League exit Vadims Burlačuks replaced Igors Kļosovs as head coach. Team won second Women's Virslīga title, also won Women's Football Cup, Baltic Women's League title, and Women's Football SuperCup

In 2026 team reached UEFA Women's Champions League second qualifying round. In first qualifying rounds semi-final team won 4-1 against Glentoran from Northern Ireland, and won in final 4-1 against Wrexham from Wales.

=== Domestic ===
Season	Division (Name)	Pos./Teams	Pl.	W	D	L	GS	GA	P	Latvian Football Cup	Top Scorer (League)	Manager
2024	1st	1/(8)	21	19	1	1	88	7	58	Runner-up	(United States) Alexxis Sierra Lipsey – 22	(Latvia) Igors Kļosovs
2025	1st	1/(7)	24	24	0	0	180	3	72	Winners	(United States) Alexxis Sierra Lipsey – 56	(Latvia) Igors Kļosovs (Latvia) Vadims Burlačuks
2026	1st	1/(7)	24	24	0	0	198	6	72	Winners	(Latvia) Jekaterina Haritonova – 26	(Latvia) Vadims Burlačuks

=== European ===
Fully up to date as of 28 July 2026

Competition	Pld	W	D	L	GF	GA	GD
UEFA Women's Champions League	6	3	0	3	15	13	+2
Total	6	3	0	3	15	13	+2

Season	Competition	Round	Club	Result
2025–26	UEFA Women's Champions League	1QR SF	(Estonia) Flora	2−1
2025–26	UEFA Women's Champions League	1QR F	(Luxembourg) Racing Union	1−2
2026–27	UEFA Women's Champions League	1QR SF	(Northern Ireland) Glentoran	4−1
2026–27	UEFA Women's Champions League	1QR F	(Wales) Wrexham	4−1
2026–27	UEFA Women's Champions League	2QR SF	(Denmark) HB Køge	1−4
2026–27	UEFA Women's Champions League	2QR F3	(Lithuania) Gintra	1−4

Notes

- 1QR SF: First qualifying round semi-final
- 1QR F: First qualifying round final
- 2QR SF: Second qualifying round semi-final
- 2QR F3: Second qualifying round third place match

== Honours ==
- Latvian Women's Higher League
  - Champions: 2024, 2025, 2026
- Women's Latvian Cup
  - Winners: 2025, 2026
    - Runners-up: 2024
- Women's Latvian Supercup
  - Winners: 2025, 2026
- Baltic Women's Football League
  - Winners: 2025, 2026

== Players ==
=== Current squad ===
As of 2 August 2026

Note: Flags indicate national team as defined under FIFA eligibility rules; some limited exceptions apply. Players may hold more than one non-FIFA nationality.

No.	Pos.	Nation	Player
1	GK	LAT	Aleksandra Torgošova
2	DF	LAT	Laura Kallase
5	MF	LAT	Darja Levikina
6	MF	LAT	Marina Teļukeviča
7	FW	LAT	Siginija Šenberga
8	MF	LAT	Anna Belova
9	MF	LAT	Līva Šteinberga
11	MF	JPN	Miyu Takahira
13	MF	LAT	Līna Kuzmina
14	FW	LAT	Ieva Krasnova
15	MF	LAT	Sofija Gluščuka
16	MF	LAT	Jekaterina Haritonova
17	FW	LAT	Nikola Preijere
18	FW	LAT	Tīna Čamane

No.	Pos.	Nation	Player
19	DF	LAT	Renāte Gaugere (captain)
22	GK	SLE	Hannah Juana
23	DF	JPN	Wakana Mitani
28	DF	AZE	Milana Rahimova
39	MF	JPN	Natsumi Taketa
49	MF	JPN	Minami Oi
80	MF	JPN	Shiori Kato
—	GK	LAT	Kristiāna Ustiņenkova
—	GK	LAT	Jekaterīna Ponomarenko
—	MF	LAT	Elīna Šustova
—	MF	LAT	Marija Klementjeva
—	MF	VEN	Karen De Los Angeles Vilau Boliva
—	FW	SLE	Marian Jumu
—	FW	LAT	Dārta Šteinberga

== Current staff ==
Coaches
Position	Name
Head coach	(Latvia) Vadims Burlačuks
Assistant coach	(Ukraine) Oleksandr Ivashchenko
Coach	(Latvia) Edgars Klibus
Goalkeeper coach	(Latvia) Aleksandrs Kulakovs
Physiotherapist	(Latvia) Katrīna Dita Mežiela
