= 2026–27 UEFA Women's Champions League =

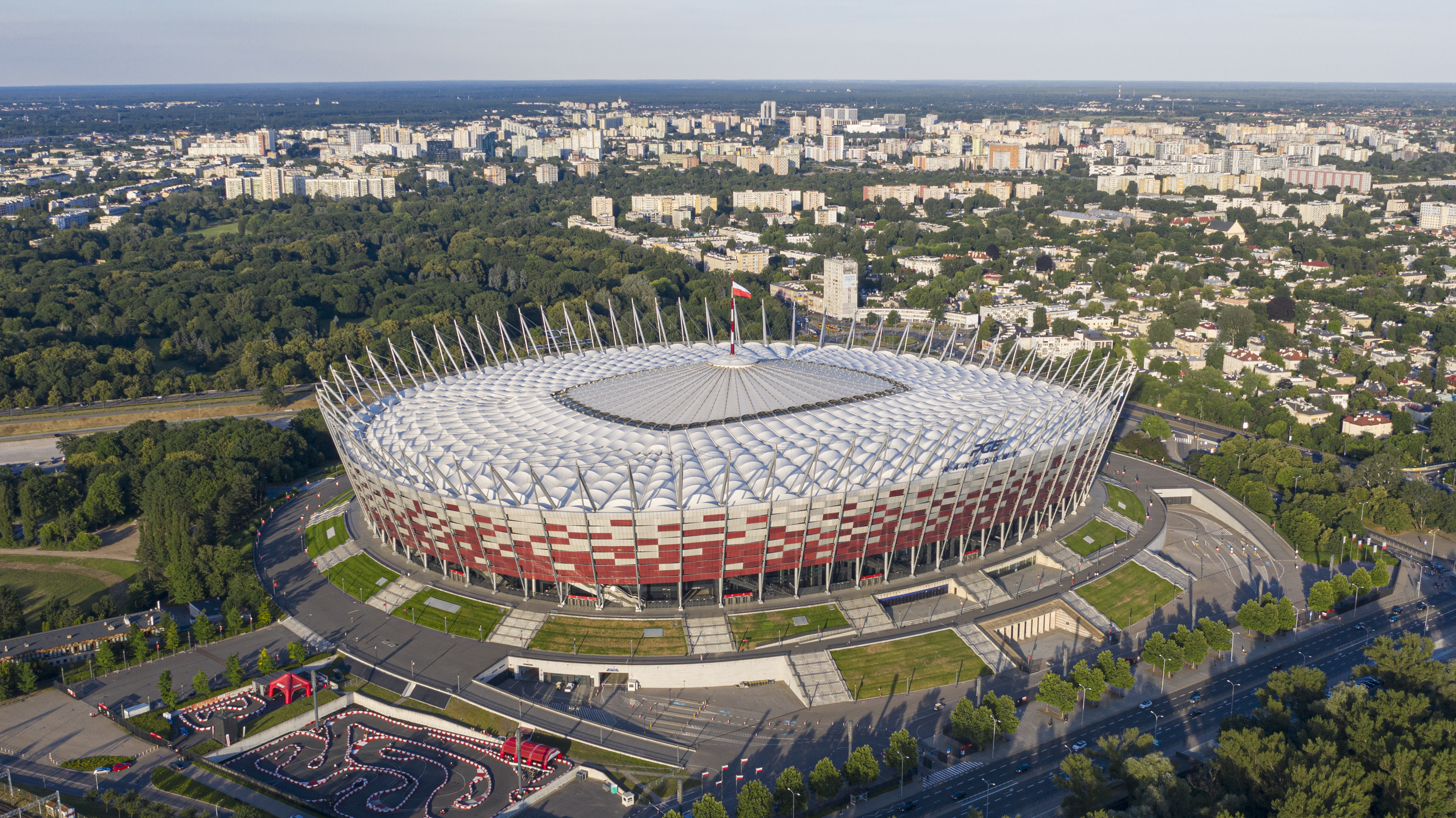
- The Stadion Narodowy in Warsaw will host the final.

Tournament details
- Dates: Qualifying rounds: 22 July – 2 September 2026; Competition proper: 22 September 2026 – 29 May 2027
- Teams: Competition proper: 18; Total: 74 (from 50 associations)

Tournament statistics
- Matches played: 45
- Goals scored: 153 (3.4 per match)
- Attendance: 173,847 (3,863 per match)
- Top scorer(s): Marie-Antoinette Katoto (OL Lyonnes); Clàudia Pina (Barcelona) (7 goals)
- All statistics correct as of 19 November 2026.

The 2026–27 UEFA Women's Champions League is the 26th edition of the European women's club football championship organised by UEFA, and the 18th edition since being rebranded as the UEFA Women's Champions League. It started on 22 July 2026 and will end with the final on 28, 29, or 30 May 2027. This is the second season under a new format, which has 18 participating teams, playing six games each against different opponents in a league phase, all in a joint group.

The Stadion Narodowy in Warsaw will host the final. The winners will automatically qualify for the 2027–28 UEFA Women's Champions League league phase and the 2028 FIFA Women's Club World Cup. Video assistant referee (VAR) will be used from the league phase onwards.

== Association team allocation ==
The association ranking based on the UEFA women's country coefficients is used to determine the number of participating teams for each association:

- Associations 1–7 each have three teams qualify.
- Associations 8–17 each have two teams qualify.
- All other associations, if they entered, each have one team qualify.
- The winners of the 2025–26 UEFA Women's Champions League and the 2025–26 UEFA Women's Europa Cup are each given an additional entry if they do not qualify for the 2026–27 UEFA Women's Champions League through their domestic leagues.

An association must have an eleven-a-side women's domestic league to enter a team. As of 2019–20, 52 of the 55 UEFA member associations organize a women's domestic league, with the exceptions being Andorra (1 club in Spain), Liechtenstein (3 clubs in Switzerland) and San Marino (1 club in Italy).

=== Association ranking ===
For the 2026–27 UEFA Women's Champions League, the associations were allocated places according to their 2025 UEFA women's Association coefficients, which took into account their performance in European competitions from 2020–21 to 2024–25.

Apart from the allocation based on the association coefficients, associations could have additional teams participating in the Champions League, as noted below:

- (TH) – Additional berth for UEFA Women's Champions League title holders
- (EC) – Additional berth for UEFA Women's Europa Cup title holders

Association ranking for 2026–27 UEFA Women's Champions League

Rank	Association	Coeff.	Teams	Notes
1	England	68.499	3	
2	France	68.333	3	
3	Spain	66.999	3	
4	Germany	61.332	3	
5	Italy	38.000	3	
6	Portugal	33.000	3	
7	Sweden	24.665	3	
8	Norway	23.000	2	
9	Netherlands	21.000	2	
10	Austria	20.750	2	
11	Czech Republic	19.332	2	
12	Ukraine	19.000	2	
13	Denmark	14.750	2	
14	Switzerland	14.250	2	
15	Albania	13.000	2	
16	Scotland	12.000	2	
17	Cyprus	12.000	2	
18	Iceland	11.750	1	
19	Serbia	11.500	1	

Rank	Association	Coeff.	Teams	Notes
20	Belarus	11.250	1	
21	Belgium	11.000	1	
22	Slovenia	11.000	1	
23	Croatia	10.500	1	
24	Romania	10.000	1	
25	Bosnia and Herzegovina	10.000	1	
26	Kazakhstan	9.750	1	
27	Turkey	9.500	1	
28	Finland	9.500	1	
29	Greece	9.000	1	
30	Lithuania	9.000	1	
31	Hungary	9.000	1	
32	Russia	9.000	0	
33	Poland	9.000	1	
34	Georgia	8.500	1	
35	Republic of Ireland	8.000	1	
36	Malta	7.500	1	
37	Luxembourg	7.500	1	

Rank	Association	Coeff.	Teams	Notes
38	Israel	7.000	1	
39	Bulgaria	7.000	1	
40	Kosovo	6.500	1	
41	Latvia	6.500	1	
42	Montenegro	6.500	1	
43	Slovakia	6.500	1	
44	Estonia	6.000	1	
45	Northern Ireland	6.000	1	
46	North Macedonia	5.500	1	
47	Moldova	5.500	1	
48	Wales	5.000	1	
49	Faroe Islands	5.000	1	
50	Armenia	4.000	1	
51	Azerbaijan	1.000	1	
NR	Gibraltar	—	0	DNE
NR	Andorra	—	0	NL
NR	Liechtenstein	—	0	NL
NR	San Marino	—	0	NL

=== Distribution ===
		Teams entering in this round	Teams advancing from the previous round
First qualifying round	Champions Path (19 teams)	19 champions from associations 29, 32–36 (except Russia) and 38–51	
Second qualifying round	Champions Path (28 teams)	20 champions from associations 8–10 and 12–28; 3 champions from associations 30–31 and 37 as the teams with the highest club coefficients, originally from the first qualifying round (Champions Path)	5 mini-tournament winners from the first qualifying round (Champions Path)
Second qualifying round	League Path (16 teams)	12 runners-up from associations 6–17; 4 third-placed teams from associations 4–7	
Third qualifying round	Champions Path (8 teams)	1 champion from association 11 as the team with the highest club coefficient, originally from the second qualifying round (Champions Path)	7 mini-tournament winners from the second qualifying round (Champions Path)
Third qualifying round	League Path (10 teams)	3 runners-up from associations 3–5; 3 third-placed teams from associations 1–3	4 mini-tournament winners from the second qualifying round (League Path)
League phase (18 teams)		UEFA Women's Europa Cup title holder; 6 champions from associations 1–6; 2 runners-up from associations 1–2	4 winners from the third qualifying round (Champions Path); 5 winners from the third qualifying round (League Path)
Knockout phase play-offs (8 teams)			8 teams ranked 5–12 from the league phase
Quarter-finals (8 teams)			4 teams ranked 1–4 from the league phase; 4 winners from the knockout phase play-offs

As the Champions League title holders (Barcelona) qualified for the league phase and the Europa Cup title holders (BK Häcken) qualified for the second qualifying round (Champions Path) via their domestic leagues' standard berth allocations, the following changes to the default access list were made:

- BK Häcken, as Europa Cup title holders that would otherwise have entered the third qualifying round (Champions Path), entered the league phase.
- Sparta Prague, as the club with the highest club coefficient that would otherwise have entered the second qualifying round (Champions Path), entered the third qualifying round (Champions Path).
- Ferencváros, Gintra and Racing Union, as the three clubs with the highest club coefficients that would otherwise have entered the first qualifying round (Champions Path), entered the second qualifying round (Champions Path).

=== Teams ===
The label in parentheses shows the route by which the club appears in that entry-round cell.

Superscript labels show additional access-list information held by that club but not used as the primary route for that cell.

- TH: Women's Champions League title holders
- EC: Women's Europa Cup title holders
- 1st, 2nd, 3rd: League positions of the previous season

Second and third qualifying rounds are divided into Champions Path (CH) and League Path (LP).

Qualified teams for 2026–27 UEFA Women's Champions League
Entry round		Teams			
League phase		(Spain) Barcelona (1st)^{TH}	(Sweden) BK Häcken (EC)^{1st}	(England) Manchester City (1st)	(England) Arsenal (2nd)
League phase		(France) OL Lyonnes (1st)	(France) Paris FC (2nd)	(Germany) Bayern Munich (1st)	(Italy) Roma (1st)
League phase		(Portugal) Benfica (1st)			
Third qualifying round	CH	(Czech Republic) Sparta Prague (1st)			
Third qualifying round	LP	(England) Chelsea (3rd)	(France) Paris Saint-Germain (3rd)	(Spain) Real Madrid (2nd)	(Spain) Real Sociedad (3rd)
Third qualifying round	LP	(Germany) VfL Wolfsburg (2nd)	(Italy) Inter Milan (2nd)		
Second qualifying round	CH	(Norway) Brann (1st)	(Netherlands) PSV Eindhoven (1st)	Austria Wien (1st)	(Ukraine) Metalist 1925 Kharkiv (1st)
Second qualifying round	CH	(Denmark) HB Køge (1st)	(Switzerland) Servette Chênois (1st)	(Albania) Vllaznia (1st)	(Scotland) Heart of Midlothian (1st)
Second qualifying round	CH	(Cyprus) Apollon Ladies (1st)	(Iceland) Breiðablik (1st)	(Serbia) TSC Bačka Topola (2nd)	(Belarus) Dinamo Minsk (1st)
Second qualifying round	CH	(Belgium) OH Leuven (1st)	(Slovenia) Mura (1st)	(Croatia) Hajduk Split (1st)	(Romania) Farul Constanța (1st)
Second qualifying round	CH	(Bosnia and Herzegovina) SFK 2000 (1st)	(Kazakhstan) Aktobe (1st)	(Turkey) Fenerbahçe (1st)	(Finland) HJK (1st)
Second qualifying round	CH	(Lithuania) Gintra (1st)	(Hungary) Ferencváros (1st)	(Luxembourg) Racing Union (1st)	
Second qualifying round	LP	(Germany) Eintracht Frankfurt (3rd)	(Italy) Juventus (3rd)	(Portugal) Sporting CP (2nd)	(Portugal) Torreense (3rd)
Second qualifying round	LP	(Sweden) Hammarby IF (2nd)	(Sweden) Malmö FF (3rd)	(Norway) Vålerenga (2nd)	(Netherlands) Ajax (2nd)
Second qualifying round	LP	(Austria) St. Pölten (2nd)	(Czech Republic) Slavia Prague (2nd)	(Ukraine) SeaSters Odesa (2nd)	(Denmark) Brøndby (2nd)
Second qualifying round	LP	(Switzerland) Young Boys (2nd)	(Albania) Apolonia (2nd)	(Scotland) Rangers (2nd)	(Cyprus) Omonia (3rd)
First qualifying round	CH	(Greece) PAOK (1st)	(Poland) Czarni Sosnowiec (1st)	(Georgia (country)) Nike Lusso (1st)	(Republic of Ireland) Athlone Town (1st)
First qualifying round	CH	(Malta) Mġarr United (1st)	(Israel) Hapoel Katamon Jerusalem (1st)	(Bulgaria) Ludogorets Razgrad (1st)	(Kosovo) Mitrovica (1st)
First qualifying round	CH	(Latvia) Riga FC (1st)	(Montenegro) Budućnost Podgorica (1st)	(Slovakia) Spartak Myjava (1st)	(Estonia) Flora (1st)
First qualifying round	CH	(Northern Ireland) Glentoran (1st)	(North Macedonia) Skopje 2014 (1st)	(Moldova) Zimbru Chișinău (1st)	(Wales) Wrexham (1st)
First qualifying round	CH	(Faroe Islands) KÍ Klaksvík (1st)	(Armenia) Pyunik (1st)	(Azerbaijan) Neftçi (1st)	

Notes

1. BK Häcken (BKH): BK Häcken entered the league phase as UEFA Women's Europa Cup title holders. They had also qualified for the second qualifying round (Champions Path) as Swedish champions; that domestic berth was rebalanced.
2. Cyprus (CYP): Aris Limassol finished second in the 2025–26 Cypriot First Division and qualified for the second qualifying round (League Path) but failed to obtain a UEFA licence. As a result, their place in the competition was passed on to the third-placed team, Omonia.
3. Russia (RUS): On 28 February 2022, Russian football clubs and national teams were suspended from FIFA and UEFA competitions. The tables reflect Russia's ongoing suspension from UEFA competitions.
4. Serbia (SRB): Red Star Belgrade finished first and champions of the 2025–26 Serbian Women's Super League and qualified for the second qualifying round (Champions Path) but failed to obtain a UEFA licence. As a result, their place in the competition was passed on to the second-placed team, TSC Bačka Topola, and the place that was entitled to TSC Bačka Topola in the first qualifying round of the 2026–27 UEFA Women's Europa Cup was passed on to the third-placed team, Spartak Subotica.

== Schedule ==
The schedule of the competition is as follows.

Schedule for 2026–27 UEFA Women's Champions League
Phase	Round	Draw date	First leg	Second leg
Qualifying rounds	First qualifying round	18 June 2026	22 July 2026 (semi-finals)	25 July 2026 (third-place play-off & final)
Qualifying rounds	Second qualifying round	18 June 2026	4–5 August 2026 (semi-finals)	7–8 August 2026 (third-place play-off & final)
Qualifying rounds	Third qualifying round	11 August 2026	25–26 August 2026	1–2 September 2026
League phase	Matchday 1	4 September 2026	22–23 September 2026	
League phase	Matchday 2	4 September 2026	30 September–1 October 2026	
League phase	Matchday 3	4 September 2026	28–29 October 2026	
League phase	Matchday 4	4 September 2026	10–11 November 2026	
League phase	Matchday 5	4 September 2026	18–19 November 2026	
League phase	Matchday 6	4 September 2026	16 December 2026	
Knockout phase	Knockout phase play-offs	18 December 2026	3–4 February 2027	10–11 February 2027
Knockout phase	Quarter-finals	18 December 2026	23–24 March 2027	31 March–1 April 2027
Knockout phase	Semi-finals	—N/a	1–2 May 2027	8–9 May 2027
Knockout phase	Final	—N/a	28, 29, or 30 May 2027 at Stadion Narodowy, Warsaw	

== Qualifying rounds ==
=== First qualifying round ===
==== Champions Path ====
Mini-tournament 1

Hosted by PAOK.

Semi-finals
22 July
(Greece) PAOK	3
(Israel) Hapoel Katamon Jerusalem	1
22 July
(Azerbaijan) Neftçi (p)	0 (4)
(Montenegro) Budućnost Podgorica	0 (3)

Final
25 July
(Greece) PAOK	3
(Azerbaijan) Neftçi	0
Third place
25 July
(Montenegro) Budućnost Podgorica	0
(Israel) Hapoel Katamon Jerusalem	1

Mini-tournament 2

Hosted by Mitrovica.

Semi-finals
22 July
(Faroe Islands) KÍ Klaksvík	0
(Bulgaria) Ludogorets Razgrad	3
22 July
(Kosovo) Mitrovica	10
(Moldova) Zimbru Chișinău	0

Final
25 July
(Kosovo) Mitrovica	2
(Bulgaria) Ludogorets Razgrad	0
Third place
25 July
(Faroe Islands) KÍ Klaksvík	4
(Moldova) Zimbru Chișinău	1

Mini-tournament 3

Hosted by Wrexham.

Semi-finals
22 July
(Armenia) Pyunik	2
(Wales) Wrexham	4
22 July
(Northern Ireland) Glentoran	1
(Latvia) Riga FC	4

Final
25 July
(Latvia) Riga FC	4
(Wales) Wrexham	1
Third place
25 July
(Northern Ireland) Glentoran	4
(Armenia) Pyunik	2

Mini-tournament 4

Hosted by Czarni Sosnowiec.

Semi-finals
22 July
(Poland) Czarni Sosnowiec	7
(Georgia (country)) Nike Lusso	1
22 July
(Republic of Ireland) Athlone Town	4
(North Macedonia) Skopje 2014	0

Final
25 July
(Republic of Ireland) Athlone Town	1
(Poland) Czarni Sosnowiec	3
Third place
25 July
(Georgia (country)) Nike Lusso	2
(North Macedonia) Skopje 2014	0

Mini-tournament 5

Hosted by Spartak Myjava.

Semi-finals
22 July
(Estonia) Flora	0
(Malta) Mġarr United	4

Final
25 July
(Slovakia) Spartak Myjava	6
(Malta) Mġarr United	1

=== Second qualifying round ===
==== Champions Path ====
Mini-tournament 1

Hosted by Mura.

Semi-finals
5 August
Austria Wien	3
(Croatia) Hajduk Split	2
5 August
(Slovenia) Mura	1
(Romania) Farul Constanța (a.e.t.)	3

Final
8 August
Austria Wien	5
(Romania) Farul Constanța	0
Third place
8 August
(Slovenia) Mura	0
(Croatia) Hajduk Split	2

Mini-tournament 2

Hosted by Ferencváros.

Semi-finals
5 August
(Norway) Brann	5
(Kosovo) Mitrovica	0
5 August
(Hungary) Ferencváros	2
(Greece) PAOK (a.e.t.)	3

Final
8 August
(Norway) Brann	3
(Greece) PAOK	2
Third place
8 August
(Hungary) Ferencváros	1
(Kosovo) Mitrovica	2

Mini-tournament 3

Hosted by Aktobe.

Semi-finals
4 August
(Belarus) Dinamo Minsk	0
(Switzerland) Servette Chênois	3
4 August
(Iceland) Breiðablik	1 (0)
(Kazakhstan) Aktobe (p)	1 (2)

Final
7 August
(Switzerland) Servette Chênois	4
(Kazakhstan) Aktobe	0
Third place
7 August
(Iceland) Breiðablik (a.e.t.)	3
(Belarus) Dinamo Minsk	2

Mini-tournament 4

Hosted by Racing Union.

Semi-finals
5 August
(Bosnia and Herzegovina) SFK 2000	2
(Netherlands) PSV Eindhoven	3
5 August
(Luxembourg) Racing Union	0
(Finland) HJK	2

Final
8 August
(Netherlands) PSV Eindhoven	3
(Finland) HJK	1
Third place
8 August
(Bosnia and Herzegovina) SFK 2000	4
(Luxembourg) Racing Union	1

Mini-tournament 5

Hosted by OH Leuven.

Semi-finals
5 August
(Ukraine) Metalist 1925 Kharkiv	1
(Turkey) Fenerbahçe	2
5 August
(Belgium) OH Leuven	4
(Serbia) TSC Bačka Topola	0

Final
8 August
(Belgium) OH Leuven (p)	1 (4)
(Turkey) Fenerbahçe	1 (2)
Third place
8 August
(Ukraine) Metalist 1925 Kharkiv (a.e.t.)	3
(Serbia) TSC Bačka Topola	2

Mini-tournament 6

Hosted by Apollon Ladies.

Semi-finals
5 August
(Albania) Vllaznia	1
(Slovakia) Spartak Myjava	2
5 August
(Cyprus) Apollon Ladies	3 (2)
(Poland) Czarni Sosnowiec (p)	3 (4)

Final
8 August
(Slovakia) Spartak Myjava	2
(Poland) Czarni Sosnowiec	4
Third place
8 August
(Albania) Vllaznia	1
(Cyprus) Apollon Ladies (a.e.t.)	2

Mini-tournament 7

Hosted by HB Køge.

Semi-finals
5 August
(Lithuania) Gintra	1
(Scotland) Heart of Midlothian	2
5 August
(Denmark) HB Køge	4
(Latvia) Riga FC	1

Final
8 August
(Denmark) HB Køge	2
(Scotland) Heart of Midlothian	1
Third place
8 August
(Lithuania) Gintra	4
(Latvia) Riga FC	1

==== League Path ====
Mini-tournament 1

Hosted by Rangers.

Semi-finals
5 August
(Netherlands) Ajax	2
(Denmark) Brøndby	0
5 August
(Czech Republic) Slavia Prague	1
(Scotland) Rangers (a.e.t.)	2

Final
8 August
(Netherlands) Ajax	2
(Scotland) Rangers	1
Third place
8 August
(Czech Republic) Slavia Prague	1 (3)
(Denmark) Brøndby (p)	1 (5)

Mini-tournament 2

Hosted by Juventus.

Semi-finals
5 August
(Italy) Juventus	2
(Portugal) Torreense	1
5 August
(Sweden) Hammarby IF	4
(Albania) Apolonia	0

Final
8 August
(Italy) Juventus (a.e.t.)	3
(Sweden) Hammarby IF	1
Third place
8 August
(Portugal) Torreense	5
(Albania) Apolonia	2

Mini-tournament 3

Hosted by Eintracht Frankfurt.

Semi-finals
5 August
(Norway) Vålerenga	0
(Sweden) Malmö FF	1
5 August
(Germany) Eintracht Frankfurt	8
(Cyprus) Omonia	0

Final
8 August
(Germany) Eintracht Frankfurt	2
(Sweden) Malmö FF	0
Third place
8 August
(Norway) Vålerenga	2
(Cyprus) Omonia	0

Mini-tournament 4

Hosted by St. Pölten.

Semi-finals
5 August
(Portugal) Sporting CP	5
(Ukraine) SeaSters Odesa	0
5 August
(Austria) St. Pölten	4
(Switzerland) Young Boys	3

Final
8 August
(Austria) St. Pölten (p)	1 (4)
(Portugal) Sporting CP	1 (1)
Third place
8 August
(Switzerland) Young Boys	1
(Ukraine) SeaSters Odesa	3

=== Third qualifying round ===
The first legs were played on 25 and 26 August, and the second legs on 1 and 2 September 2026. The winners of the ties advanced to the league phase.

Third qualifying round
Team 1	Agg.	Team 2	1st leg	2nd leg
Champions Path
Sparta Prague (Czech Republic)	3–5	(Switzerland) Servette Chênois	3–2	0–3
PSV Eindhoven (Netherlands)	1–2	(Denmark) HB Køge	0–1	1–1
Brann (Norway)	2–5	Austria Wien	2–1	0–4
Czarni Sosnowiec (Poland)	2–6 (Note: Order of legs reversed after original draw.)	(Belgium) OH Leuven	1–4	1–2
League Path
Eintracht Frankfurt (Germany)	2–6	(France) Paris Saint-Germain	1–1	1–5 (a.e.t.)
St. Pölten (Austria)	1–4	(Italy) Juventus	0–3	1–1
VfL Wolfsburg (Germany)	3–3 (4–5 p)	(Italy) Inter Milan	2–0	1–3 (a.e.t.)
Chelsea (England)	6–2	(Spain) Real Sociedad	5–2	1–0
Ajax (Netherlands)	1–4	(Spain) Real Madrid	0–2	1–2

== League phase ==
Location of teams of the 2026–27 UEFA Women's Champions League league phase

The league phase draw for the 2026–27 UEFA Women's Champions League took place on 4 September 2026. The 18 teams were divided into three pots of six teams. Each team will face two opponents from each of the three pots, one at home and one away.

Inter Milan are making their debut in a group or league stage of a major UEFA women's competition.

This is the first edition in which no country is making its debut in a league phase or group stage of the UEFA Women's Champions League.

=== Table ===
Pos	Team	Pld	W	D	L	GF	GA	GD	Pts	Qualification
1	(Royal Spanish Football Federation) Barcelona (Q)	5	4	1	0	26	3	+23	13	Advance to the quarter-finals (seeded)
2	(French Football Federation) OL Lyonnes (Q)	5	4	1	0	22	0	+22	13	Advance to the quarter-finals (seeded)
3	(German Football Association) Bayern Munich (T)	5	3	2	0	13	5	+8	11	Advance to the quarter-finals (seeded)
4	(The Football Association) Chelsea (T)	5	3	2	0	4	0	+4	11	Advance to the quarter-finals (seeded)
5	(The Football Association) Manchester City (T)	5	2	3	0	10	5	+5	9 (Note: Ranked based on away goals scored, Manchester City 8, Real Madrid 3)	Advance to the knockout phase play-offs (seeded)
6	(Royal Spanish Football Federation) Real Madrid (T)	5	2	3	0	10	5	+5	9	Advance to the knockout phase play-offs (seeded)
7	(Italian Football Federation) Juventus (T)	5	3	0	2	10	9	+1	9	Advance to the knockout phase play-offs (seeded)
8	(The Football Association) Arsenal (T)	5	2	2	1	7	5	+2	8	Advance to the knockout phase play-offs (seeded)
9	(Italian Football Federation) Roma	5	2	1	2	5	11	−6	7	Advance to the knockout phase play-offs (unseeded)
10	(Portuguese Football Federation) Benfica	5	2	0	3	7	11	−4	6	Advance to the knockout phase play-offs (unseeded)
11	(French Football Federation) Paris Saint-Germain	5	1	2	2	8	5	+3	5	Advance to the knockout phase play-offs (unseeded)
12	(French Football Federation) Paris FC	5	1	2	2	7	12	−5	5	Advance to the knockout phase play-offs (unseeded)
13	(Danish Football Association) HB Køge	5	1	1	3	7	13	−6	4	
14	(Italian Football Federation) Inter Milan	5	1	1	3	4	14	−10	4	
15	(Swiss Football Association) Servette Chênois	5	1	0	4	7	22	−15	3	
16	(Swedish Football Association) BK Häcken	5	0	2	3	1	7	−6	2	
17	(Royal Belgian Football Association) OH Leuven	5	0	2	3	2	13	−11	2	
18	(Austrian Football Association) Austria Wien (E)	5	0	1	4	3	13	−10	1	

Updated to match(es) played on 19 November 2026. Source: UEFA
Rules for classification: League phase tiebreakers
(E) Eliminated; (Q) Qualified for the phase indicated; (T) Qualified, but not yet for the particular phase indicated

=== Results ===
Matchday 1
Home team	Score	Away team
Bayern Munich (Germany)	2–2	(England) Manchester City
Inter Milan (Italy)	1–0	(Sweden) BK Häcken
Arsenal (England)	1–0	(Denmark) HB Køge
Real Madrid (Spain)	1–1	(France) Paris Saint-Germain
Juventus (Italy)	1–2	(Portugal) Benfica
OH Leuven (Belgium)	0–0	(Italy) Roma
Servette Chênois (Switzerland)	0–8	(France) OL Lyonnes
Barcelona (Spain)	5–2	(France) Paris FC
Chelsea (England)	1–0	Austria Wien

Matchday 2
Home team	Score	Away team
Roma (Italy)	0–6	(Spain) Barcelona
BK Häcken (Sweden)	0–3	(Italy) Juventus
Paris FC (France)	2–2	(England) Arsenal
OL Lyonnes (France)	0–0	(England) Chelsea
Benfica (Portugal)	0–3	(Germany) Bayern Munich
Austria Wien	1–1	(Italy) Inter Milan
HB Køge (Denmark)	5–1	(Switzerland) Servette Chênois
Paris Saint-Germain (France)	5–0	(Belgium) OH Leuven
Manchester City (England)	1–1	(Spain) Real Madrid

Matchday 3
Home team	Score	Away team
Servette Chênois (Switzerland)	5–1	(Belgium) OH Leuven
Chelsea (England)	2–0	(Italy) Roma
Bayern Munich (Germany)	2–2	(Spain) Real Madrid
Arsenal (England)	3–0	(Portugal) Benfica
OL Lyonnes (France)	6–0	(Italy) Inter Milan
Austria Wien	1–4	(Italy) Juventus
Paris FC (France)	1–1	(Sweden) BK Häcken
Manchester City (England)	1–1	(France) Paris Saint-Germain
HB Køge (Denmark)	0–8	(Spain) Barcelona

Matchday 4
Home team	Score	Away team
Real Madrid (Spain)	3–0	(France) Paris FC
BK Häcken (Sweden)	0–0	(England) Chelsea
Paris Saint-Germain (France)	1–2	(Germany) Bayern Munich
Roma (Italy)	2–1	(Switzerland) Servette Chênois
Inter Milan (Italy)	1–4	(England) Manchester City
OH Leuven (Belgium)	1–1	(Denmark) HB Køge
Juventus (Italy)	0–6	(France) OL Lyonnes
Barcelona (Spain)	1–1	(England) Arsenal
Benfica (Portugal)	3–1	Austria Wien

Matchday 5
Home team	Score	Away team
Real Madrid (Spain)	3–1	(Italy) Inter Milan
BK Häcken (Sweden)	0–2	(England) Manchester City
Chelsea (England)	1–0	(France) Paris Saint-Germain
Juventus (Italy)	2–0	(Belgium) OH Leuven
Paris FC (France)	2–1	(Denmark) HB Køge
Austria Wien	0–4	(Germany) Bayern Munich
Barcelona (Spain)	6–0	(Switzerland) Servette Chênois
Arsenal (England)	0–2	(France) OL Lyonnes
Benfica (Portugal)	2–3	(Italy) Roma

Matchday 6
Home team	Score	Away team
OL Lyonnes (France)	16 Dec	(Sweden) BK Häcken
Bayern Munich (Germany)	16 Dec	(Spain) Barcelona
Paris Saint-Germain (France)	16 Dec	(Italy) Juventus
Roma (Italy)	16 Dec	(Spain) Real Madrid
Manchester City (England)	16 Dec	Austria Wien
OH Leuven (Belgium)	16 Dec	(England) Chelsea
HB Køge (Denmark)	16 Dec	(Portugal) Benfica
Inter Milan (Italy)	16 Dec	(England) Arsenal
Servette Chênois (Switzerland)	16 Dec	(France) Paris FC

== Knockout phase ==
=== Bracket ===
Knockout phase play-offs

Quarter-finals

Semi-finals

Final
28–30 May – Warsaw

=== Knockout phase play-offs ===
Knockout phase play-offs
Team 1	Agg.	Team 2	1st leg	2nd leg
	Match 1		3–4 Feb	10–11 Feb
	Match 2		3–4 Feb	10–11 Feb
	Match 3		3–4 Feb	10–11 Feb
	Match 4		3–4 Feb	10–11 Feb

=== Quarter-finals ===
Quarter-finals
Team 1	Agg.	Team 2	1st leg	2nd leg
	Match 1		23–24 Mar	31 Mar - 1 Apr
	Match 2		23–24 Mar	31 Mar - 1 Apr
	Match 3		23–24 Mar	31 Mar - 1 Apr
	Match 4		23–24 Mar	31 Mar - 1 Apr

=== Semi-finals ===
Semi-finals
Team 1	Agg.	Team 2	1st leg	2nd leg
	Match 1		1–2 May	8–9 May
	Match 2		1–2 May	8–9 May

=== Final ===
28–30 May 2027
TBC UTC+2

Winner SF1	v	Winner SF2

Stadion Narodowy, Warsaw

== Statistics ==
As of 19 November 2026 Statistics exclude qualifying rounds.

=== Top goalscorers ===
Rank	Player	Team	Goals
1	(France) Marie-Antoinette Katoto	(France) OL Lyonnes	7
1	(Spain) Clàudia Pina	(Spain) Barcelona	7
3	(Norway) Caroline Graham Hansen	(Spain) Barcelona	6
4	(Haiti) Melchie Dumornay	(France) OL Lyonnes	4
4	(Poland) Ewa Pajor	(Spain) Barcelona	4
4	(England) Alessia Russo	(England) Arsenal	4
7	(France) Vicki Bècho	(France) OL Lyonnes	3
7	(Netherlands) Lineth Beerensteyn	(Spain) Real Madrid	3
7	(Germany) Klara Bühl	(Germany) Bayern Munich	3
7	(Netherlands) Kayleigh van Dooren	(Italy) Roma	3
7	(Italy) Gloria Marinelli	(Switzerland) Servette Chênois	3
7	(Spain) Alba Redondo	(Italy) Juventus	3
7	(Jamaica) Khadija Shaw	(England) Manchester City	3

== See also ==
- 2026–27 UEFA Women's Europa Cup
- 2026–27 UEFA Champions League
- 2026–27 UEFA Europa League
- 2026–27 UEFA Conference League
- 2026 UEFA Super Cup
- 2026–27 UEFA Youth League
