= 2026–27 UEFA Women's Champions League league phase =

International football club competition in Europe

The 2026–27 UEFA Women's Champions League league phase is scheduled to begin on 22 September 2026 and end on 16 December 2026. A total of 18 teams will compete in the league phase to decide the 12 places in the knockout phase of the 2026–27 UEFA Women's Champions League.

== Format ==
Each team played six matches, three at home and three away, against six different opponents, with all teams ranked in a single league table (known as the Swiss system). Teams were separated into three pots based on their 2026 UEFA club coefficients, and each team played two teams from each of the three pots – one at home and one away. The top four teams in the standings received a bye to the quarter-finals. The teams ranked from fifth to eighth contested the knockout phase play-offs, with the teams ranked from 9th to 12th. Teams ranked from 13th to 18th were eliminated.

=== Tiebreakers ===
Teams were ranked according to points (3 points for a win, 1 point for a draw, 0 points for a loss). If two or more teams were equal on points upon completion of the league phase, the following tiebreaking criteria was applied, in the order given, to determine their rankings:

While the league phase was in progress, teams were ranked according to criteria 1–5 only, and if still tied, were given equal ranking and sorted alphabetically. Criteria 6–10 were only used after the final matches have taken place.

1. Goal difference;
2. Goals scored;
3. Away goals scored;
4. Wins;
5. Away wins;
6. Higher number of points obtained collectively by league phase opponents;
7. Superior collective goal difference of league phase opponents;
8. Higher number of goals scored collectively by league phase opponents;
9. Lower disciplinary points total (direct red card or expulsion for two yellow cards in one match = 3 points, yellow card = 1 point);
10. UEFA club coefficient.

== Teams and seeding ==
Key to colours
Teams ranked 1 to 4 advanced to the quarter-finals as a seeded team
Teams ranked 5 to 8 advanced to the knockout phase play-offs as a seeded team
Teams ranked 9 to 12 advanced to the knockout phase play-offs as an unseeded team

Pot 1
Team	Notes	Coeff.
(Spain) Barcelona		135.000
(France) OL Lyonnes		116.750
(England) Chelsea		95.500
(Germany) Bayern Munich		81.250
(England) Arsenal		78.000
(France) Paris Saint-Germain		63.000

Pot 2
Team	Notes	Coeff.
(Spain) Real Madrid		60.500
(Italy) Juventus		51.250
(Sweden) BK Häcken		44.000
(Italy) Roma		42.000
(Portugal) Benfica		39.000
(France) Paris FC		27.750

Pot 3
Team	Notes	Coeff.
(England) Manchester City		22.000
(Belgium) OH Leuven		12.250
(Denmark) HB Køge		10.500
Austria Wien		10.000
(Italy) Inter Milan		9.116
(Switzerland) Servette Chênois		8.500

Notes

1. ^{TH} Champions League title holders (automatic top seed of pot 1)
2. ^{EC} Europa Cup title holders
3. ^{CH} Winners of the third qualifying round (Champions Path)
4. ^{LP} Winners of the third qualifying round (League Path)

== Draw ==
League phase opponents by club
Club	Pot 1 opponents		Pot 2 opponents		Pot 3 opponents		Avg coeff.
Club	Home	Away	Home	Away	Home	Away	Avg coeff.
(Spain) Barcelona	Arsenal	Bayern Munich	Paris FC	Roma	Servette Chênois	HB Køge	41.3
(France) OL Lyonnes	Chelsea	Arsenal	BK Häcken	Juventus	Inter Milan	Servette Chênois	47.7
(England) Chelsea	Paris Saint-Germain	OL Lyonnes	Roma	BK Häcken	Austria Wien	OH Leuven	48.0
(Germany) Bayern Munich	Barcelona	Paris Saint-Germain	Real Madrid	Benfica	Manchester City	Austria Wien	54.9
(England) Arsenal	OL Lyonnes	Barcelona	Benfica	Paris FC	HB Køge	Inter Milan	56.3
(France) Paris Saint-Germain	Bayern Munich	Chelsea	Juventus	Real Madrid	OH Leuven	Manchester City	53.8
(Spain) Real Madrid	Paris Saint-Germain	Bayern Munich	Paris FC	Roma	Inter Milan	Manchester City	40.9
(Italy) Juventus	OL Lyonnes	Paris Saint-Germain	Benfica	BK Häcken	OH Leuven	Austria Wien	47.5
(Sweden) BK Häcken	Chelsea	OL Lyonnes	Juventus	Paris FC	Manchester City	Inter Milan	53.7
(Italy) Roma	Barcelona	Chelsea	Real Madrid	Benfica	Servette Chênois	OH Leuven	58.5
(Portugal) Benfica	Bayern Munich	Arsenal	Roma	Juventus	Austria Wien	HB Køge	45.4
(France) Paris FC	Arsenal	Barcelona	BK Häcken	Real Madrid	HB Køge	Servette Chênois	56.0
(England) Manchester City	Paris Saint-Germain	Bayern Munich	Real Madrid	BK Häcken	Austria Wien	Inter Milan	44.6
(Belgium) OH Leuven	Chelsea	Paris Saint-Germain	Roma	Juventus	HB Køge	Servette Chênois	45.0
(Denmark) HB Køge	Barcelona	Arsenal	Benfica	Paris FC	Servette Chênois	OH Leuven	50.1
Austria Wien	Bayern Munich	Chelsea	Juventus	Benfica	Inter Milan	Manchester City	49.7
(Italy) Inter Milan	Arsenal	OL Lyonnes	BK Häcken	Real Madrid	Manchester City	Austria Wien	55.2
(Switzerland) Servette Chênois	OL Lyonnes	Barcelona	Paris FC	Roma	OH Leuven	HB Køge	57.3

== League phase table ==
Pos	Team	Pld	W	D	L	GF	GA	GD	Pts	Qualification
1	(Royal Spanish Football Federation) Barcelona (Q)	5	4	1	0	26	3	+23	13	Advance to the quarter-finals (seeded)
2	(French Football Federation) OL Lyonnes (Q)	5	4	1	0	22	0	+22	13	Advance to the quarter-finals (seeded)
3	(German Football Association) Bayern Munich (T)	5	3	2	0	13	5	+8	11	Advance to the quarter-finals (seeded)
4	(The Football Association) Chelsea (T)	5	3	2	0	4	0	+4	11	Advance to the quarter-finals (seeded)
5	(The Football Association) Manchester City (T)	5	2	3	0	10	5	+5	9 (Note: Ranked based on away goals scored, Manchester City 8, Real Madrid 3)	Advance to the knockout phase play-offs (seeded)
6	(Royal Spanish Football Federation) Real Madrid (T)	5	2	3	0	10	5	+5	9	Advance to the knockout phase play-offs (seeded)
7	(Italian Football Federation) Juventus (T)	5	3	0	2	10	9	+1	9	Advance to the knockout phase play-offs (seeded)
8	(The Football Association) Arsenal (T)	5	2	2	1	7	5	+2	8	Advance to the knockout phase play-offs (seeded)
9	(Italian Football Federation) Roma	5	2	1	2	5	11	−6	7	Advance to the knockout phase play-offs (unseeded)
10	(Portuguese Football Federation) Benfica	5	2	0	3	7	11	−4	6	Advance to the knockout phase play-offs (unseeded)
11	(French Football Federation) Paris Saint-Germain	5	1	2	2	8	5	+3	5	Advance to the knockout phase play-offs (unseeded)
12	(French Football Federation) Paris FC	5	1	2	2	7	12	−5	5	Advance to the knockout phase play-offs (unseeded)
13	(Danish Football Association) HB Køge	5	1	1	3	7	13	−6	4	
14	(Italian Football Federation) Inter Milan	5	1	1	3	4	14	−10	4	
15	(Swiss Football Association) Servette Chênois	5	1	0	4	7	22	−15	3	
16	(Swedish Football Association) BK Häcken	5	0	2	3	1	7	−6	2	
17	(Royal Belgian Football Association) OH Leuven	5	0	2	3	2	13	−11	2	
18	(Austrian Football Association) Austria Wien (E)	5	0	1	4	3	13	−10	1	

Updated to match(es) played on 19 November 2026. Source: UEFA
Rules for classification: League phase tiebreakers
(E) Eliminated; (Q) Qualified for the phase indicated; (T) Qualified, but not yet for the particular phase indicated

== Results summary ==
Matchday 1
Home team	Score	Away team
Bayern Munich (Germany)	2–2	(England) Manchester City
Inter Milan (Italy)	1–0	(Sweden) BK Häcken
Arsenal (England)	1–0	(Denmark) HB Køge
Real Madrid (Spain)	1–1	(France) Paris Saint-Germain
Juventus (Italy)	1–2	(Portugal) Benfica
OH Leuven (Belgium)	0–0	(Italy) Roma
Servette Chênois (Switzerland)	0–8	(France) OL Lyonnes
Barcelona (Spain)	5–2	(France) Paris FC
Chelsea (England)	1–0	Austria Wien

Matchday 2
Home team	Score	Away team
Roma (Italy)	0–6	(Spain) Barcelona
BK Häcken (Sweden)	0–3	(Italy) Juventus
Paris FC (France)	2–2	(England) Arsenal
OL Lyonnes (France)	0–0	(England) Chelsea
Benfica (Portugal)	0–3	(Germany) Bayern Munich
Austria Wien	1–1	(Italy) Inter Milan
HB Køge (Denmark)	5–1	(Switzerland) Servette Chênois
Paris Saint-Germain (France)	5–0	(Belgium) OH Leuven
Manchester City (England)	1–1	(Spain) Real Madrid

Matchday 3
Home team	Score	Away team
Servette Chênois (Switzerland)	5–1	(Belgium) OH Leuven
Chelsea (England)	2–0	(Italy) Roma
Bayern Munich (Germany)	2–2	(Spain) Real Madrid
Arsenal (England)	3–0	(Portugal) Benfica
OL Lyonnes (France)	6–0	(Italy) Inter Milan
Austria Wien	1–4	(Italy) Juventus
Paris FC (France)	1–1	(Sweden) BK Häcken
Manchester City (England)	1–1	(France) Paris Saint-Germain
HB Køge (Denmark)	0–8	(Spain) Barcelona

Matchday 4
Home team	Score	Away team
Real Madrid (Spain)	3–0	(France) Paris FC
BK Häcken (Sweden)	0–0	(England) Chelsea
Paris Saint-Germain (France)	1–2	(Germany) Bayern Munich
Roma (Italy)	2–1	(Switzerland) Servette Chênois
Inter Milan (Italy)	1–4	(England) Manchester City
OH Leuven (Belgium)	1–1	(Denmark) HB Køge
Juventus (Italy)	0–6	(France) OL Lyonnes
Barcelona (Spain)	1–1	(England) Arsenal
Benfica (Portugal)	3–1	Austria Wien

Matchday 5
Home team	Score	Away team
Real Madrid (Spain)	3–1	(Italy) Inter Milan
BK Häcken (Sweden)	0–2	(England) Manchester City
Chelsea (England)	1–0	(France) Paris Saint-Germain
Juventus (Italy)	2–0	(Belgium) OH Leuven
Paris FC (France)	2–1	(Denmark) HB Køge
Austria Wien	0–4	(Germany) Bayern Munich
Barcelona (Spain)	6–0	(Switzerland) Servette Chênois
Arsenal (England)	0–2	(France) OL Lyonnes
Benfica (Portugal)	2–3	(Italy) Roma

Matchday 6
Home team	Score	Away team
OL Lyonnes (France)	16 Dec	(Sweden) BK Häcken
Bayern Munich (Germany)	16 Dec	(Spain) Barcelona
Paris Saint-Germain (France)	16 Dec	(Italy) Juventus
Roma (Italy)	16 Dec	(Spain) Real Madrid
Manchester City (England)	16 Dec	Austria Wien
OH Leuven (Belgium)	16 Dec	(England) Chelsea
HB Køge (Denmark)	16 Dec	(Portugal) Benfica
Inter Milan (Italy)	16 Dec	(England) Arsenal
Servette Chênois (Switzerland)	16 Dec	(France) Paris FC

== Matches ==
Times are CET or CEST, (Note: CEST (UTC+2) for dates up to 1 October 2026 (matchdays 1–2), and CET (UTC+1) for dates thereafter (matchdays 3–6).) as listed by UEFA (local times, if different, are in parentheses).

=== Matchday 1 ===
22 September 2026
18:45

Bayern Munich (Germany)	2–2	(England) Manchester City
Gwinn 11'; Casparij 28' (o.g.)	Report	Mead 45'; Wamser 86'

Sportpark Unterhaching, Unterhaching
Attendance: 4,291
Referee: Olatz Rivera Olmedo (Spain)

22 September 2026
18:45

Inter Milan (Italy)	1–0	(Sweden) BK Häcken
Bugeja 5'	Report

Brianteo, Monza
Attendance: 943
Referee: Ivana Martinčić (Croatia)

22 September 2026
21:00 (20:00 UTC+1)

Arsenal (England)	1–0	(Denmark) HB Køge
Caldentey 90+3' (pen.)	Report

Meadow Park, Borehamwood
Attendance: 1,910
Referee: Eleni Antoniou (Greece)

22 September 2026
21:00

Real Madrid (Spain)	1–1	(France) Paris Saint-Germain
Schröder 2'	Report	Karchaoui 74' (pen.)

Alfredo Di Stéfano, Madrid
Attendance: 1,228
Referee: Ivana Projkovska (North Macedonia)

22 September 2026
21:00

Juventus (Italy)	1–2	(Portugal) Benfica
Redondo 86'	Report	Lund 40' (pen.), 61'

Juventus Stadium, Turin
Attendance: 3,144
Referee: Lina Lehtovaara (Finland)

23 September 2026
18:45

OH Leuven (Belgium)	0–0	(Italy) Roma
	Report

Den Dreef, Leuven
Attendance: 1,484
Referee: Frida Klarlund (Denmark)

23 September 2026
18:45

Servette Chênois (Switzerland)	0–8	(France) OL Lyonnes
	Report	Ballesté 8' (o.g.); Katoto 28', 40', 47'; Dumornay 45+1', 54'; Sobal 68' (o.g.); Benyahia 89'

Stade de Genève, Lancy
Attendance: 5,762
Referee: Michaela Pachtová (Czech Republic)

23 September 2026
21:00

Barcelona (Spain)	5–2	(France) Paris FC
Kerolin 18'; Serrajordi 28'; Pajor 35', 70'; Graham Hansen 43'	Report	Viens 5'; Mateo 73'

Johan Cruyff Stadium, Sant Joan Despí
Attendance: 2,574
Referee: Michalina Diakow (Poland)

23 September 2026
21:00 (20:00 UTC+1)

Chelsea (England)	1–0	Austria Wien
Kaptein 11'	Report

Cherry Red Records Stadium, Wimbledon
Attendance: 846
Referee: Miriama Bočková (Slovakia)

=== Matchday 2 ===
30 September 2026
18:45

Roma (Italy)	0–6	(Spain) Barcelona
	Report	Graham Hansen 19', 60'; Oladipo 39' (o.g.); Pina 53', 75'; Pajor 85'

Stadio Tre Fontane, Rome
Attendance: 2,460
Referee: Kirsty Dowle (England)

30 September 2026
18:45

BK Häcken (Sweden)	0–3	(Italy) Juventus
	Report	Pinto 57'; Stølen Godø 77'; Redondo 88'

Nordic Wellness Arena, Gothenburg
Attendance: 3,674
Referee: Caroline Lanssens (Belgium)

30 September 2026
18:45

Paris FC (France)	2–2	(England) Arsenal
Mateo 72'; Mendy 87' (pen.)	Report	Russo 41'; Stanway 50'

Stade Jean-Bouin, Paris
Attendance: 11,207
Referee: Iuliana Demetrescu (Romania)

30 September 2026
21:00

OL Lyonnes (France)	0–0	(England) Chelsea
	Report

Parc Olympique Lyonnais, Décines-Charpieu
Attendance: 7,324
Referee: Marta Huerta de Aza (Spain)

30 September 2026
21:00 (20:00 UTC+1)

Benfica (Portugal)	0–3	(Germany) Bayern Munich
	Report	Bühl 74'; Harder 80'; Kett 88'

Estádio da Luz, Lisbon
Attendance: 6,406
Referee: Maria Sole Ferrieri Caputi (Italy)

1 October 2026
18:45

Austria Wien	1–1	(Italy) Inter Milan
Uka 21'	Report	Andrés 90+4'

Franz Horr Stadium, Vienna
Attendance: 3,609
Referee: Franziska Wildfeuer (Germany)

1 October 2026
18:45

HB Køge (Denmark)	5–1	(Switzerland) Servette Chênois
Schultz 9'; Nadim 28'; Carage 35' (o.g.); Carusa 64'; Óskarsdóttir 88'	Report	Ballesté 48'

Køge Stadium, Køge
Attendance: 775
Referee: Alina Peşu (Romania)

1 October 2026
21:00

Paris Saint-Germain (France)	5–0	(Belgium) OH Leuven
Ajibade 9'; Feller 51', 63'; Karchaoui 69'; Yaya 84'	Report

Campus PSG, Poissy
Attendance: 681
Referee: Catarina Campos (Portugal)

1 October 2026
21:00 (20:00 UTC+1)

Manchester City (England)	1–1	(Spain) Real Madrid
Shaw 51'	Report	Caicedo 29'

Academy Stadium, Manchester
Attendance: 1,938
Referee: Silvia Gasperotti (Italy)

=== Matchday 3 ===
28 October 2026
18:45

Servette Chênois (Switzerland)	5–1	(Belgium) OH Leuven
Hernández 16', 58'; Marinelli 38', 44'; Marchão 83'	Report	Conijnenberg 82'

Stade de Genève, Lancy
Attendance: 3,456
Referee: Rasa Grigonė (Lithuania)

28 October 2026
18:45 (17:45 UTC+0)

Chelsea (England)	2–0	(Italy) Roma
Carpenter 51'; Buchanan 89'	Report

Cherry Red Records Stadium, Wimbledon
Attendance: 2,510
Referee: Olatz Rivera Olmedo (Spain)

28 October 2026
18:45

Bayern Munich (Germany)	2–2	(Spain) Real Madrid
Imade 30'; Tanikawa 52'	Report	Del Castillo 7'; Beerensteyn 22'

Sportpark Unterhaching, Unterhaching
Attendance: 6,239
Referee: Eleni Antoniou (Greece)

28 October 2026
21:00 (20:00 UTC+0)

Arsenal (England)	3–0	(Portugal) Benfica
Russo 39', 66', 79' (pen.)	Report

Meadow Park, Borehamwood
Attendance: 2,438
Referee: Ivana Projkovska (North Macedonia)

28 October 2026
21:00

OL Lyonnes (France)	6–0	(Italy) Inter Milan
Katoto 18', 45'; Yohannes 59'; Bècho 69', 76', 90+4'	Report

Parc Olympique Lyonnais, Décines-Charpieu
Attendance: 8,118
Referee: Lotta Vuorio (Finland)

29 October 2026
18:45

Austria Wien	1–4	(Italy) Juventus
Cordes 77'	Report	Pavan 39'; Redondo 63' (pen.); Sylla 82'; Bartel 90+1'

Franz Horr Stadium, Vienna
Attendance: 4,630
Referee: Ewa Augustyn (Poland)

29 October 2026
18:45

Paris FC (France)	1–1	(Sweden) BK Häcken
Viens 3'	Report	Anvegård 90+4'

Stade Sébastien Charléty, Paris
Attendance: 2,905
Referee: Hristiyana Guteva (Bulgaria)

29 October 2026
21:00 (20:00 UTC+0)

Manchester City (England)	1–1	(France) Paris Saint-Germain
Shaw 85' (pen.)	Report	Gilbert 88'

Academy Stadium, Manchester
Attendance: 2,167
Referee: Alina Peşu (Romania)

29 October 2026
21:00

HB Køge (Denmark)	0–8	(Spain) Barcelona
	Report	Hansen 12' (pen.); Pajor 33'; Brugts 54'; Guijarro 59'; Serrajordi 62'; Nazareth 67'; Pina 70', 85'

Køge Stadium, Køge
Attendance: 5,884
Referee: Volha Blotskaya (Belarus)

=== Matchday 4 ===
10 November 2026
18:45

Real Madrid (Spain)	3–0	(France) Paris FC
Caruso 55'; Beerensteyn 65'; Caicedo 81'	Report

Alfredo Di Stéfano, Madrid
Attendance: 962
Referee: Emily Heaslip (England)

10 November 2026
18:45

BK Häcken (Sweden)	0–0	(England) Chelsea
	Report

Nordic Wellness Arena, Gothenburg
Attendance: 4,614
Referee: Fabienne Michel (Germany)

10 November 2026
21:00

Paris Saint-Germain (France)	1–2	(Germany) Bayern Munich
Dudek 65' (pen.)	Report	Kiedrzynek 29' (o.g.); Bühl 40'

Parc des Princes, Paris
Attendance: 8,556
Referee: Frida Klarlund (Denmark)

10 November 2026
21:00

Roma (Italy)	2–1	(Switzerland) Servette Chênois
Van Dooren 25'; Pilgrim 34'	Report	Marinelli 73' (pen.)

Stadio Tre Fontane, Rome
Attendance: 1,083
Referee: Catarina Campos (Portugal)

10 November 2026
21:00

Inter Milan (Italy)	1–4	(England) Manchester City
Bartoli 24'	Report	Fujino 33', 44'; Casparij 56'; Clinton 70'

Brianteo, Monza
Attendance: 2,596
Referee: Marta Huerta De Aza (Spain)

11 November 2026
18:45

OH Leuven (Belgium)	1–1	(Denmark) HB Køge
Conijnenberg 79'	Report	Sørensen 82'

Den Dreef, Leuven
Attendance: 1,879
Referee: Miriama Bočková (Slovakia)

11 November 2026
21:00

Juventus (Italy)	0–6	(France) OL Lyonnes
	Report	Katoto 31', 35'; Dumornay 40'; Yohannes 80'; Shrader 85'; Renard 90+1'

Stadio Vittorio Pozzo, Biella
Attendance: 717
Referee: Emanuela Rusta (Albania)

12 November 2026
18:45

Barcelona (Spain)	1–1	(England) Arsenal
Graham Hansen 59'	Report	Maanum 22'

Camp Nou, Barcelona
Attendance: 26,171
Referee: Ivana Martinčić (Croatia)

12 November 2026
21:00 (20:00 UTC+0)

Benfica (Portugal)	3–1	Austria Wien
Andreia Norton 5'; Møller 76'; Nycole Raysla 90+3'	Report	Wenninger 53' (pen.)

Estádio da Luz, Lisbon
Attendance: 1,913
Referee: Caroline Lanssens (Belgium)

=== Matchday 5 ===
18 November 2026
18:45

Real Madrid (Spain)	3–1	(Italy) Inter Milan
Beerensteyn 28'; Bruun 85', 90+4' (pen.)	Report

Alfredo Di Stéfano, Madrid
Attendance: 1,083
Referee: Katalin Kulcsár (Hungary)

18 November 2026
18:45

BK Häcken (Sweden)	0–2	(England) Manchester City
	Report	Hemp 56'; Shaw 77'

Nordic Wellness Arena, Gothenburg
Attendance: 3,879
Referee: Michalina Diakow (Poland)

18 November 2026
21:00 (20:00 UTC+0)

Chelsea (England)	1–0	(France) Paris Saint-Germain
Buurman 87'	Report

Cherry Red Records Stadium, Wimbledon
Attendance: 2,806
Referee: Maria Sole Ferrieri Caputi (Italy)

18 November 2026
21:00

Juventus (Italy)	2–0	(Belgium) OH Leuven
Serturini 86'; Pavan 90+3'	Report

Stadio La Marmora-Pozzo, Biella
Attendance: 320
Referee: Kristina Georgieva (Bulgaria)

19 November 2026
18:45

Paris FC (France)	2–1	(Denmark) HB Køge
Scott 35'; Ould Hocine 90+4'	Report	Paulson 12'

Stade Sébastien Charléty, Paris
Attendance: 2,137
Referee: Lina Lehtovaara (Finland)

19 November 2026
18:45

Austria Wien	0–4	(Germany) Bayern Munich
	Report	Bühl 27'; Harder 45+1'; Şehitler 75'; Proost 90+3'

Franz Horr Stadium, Vienna
Attendance: 9,124
Referee: Kirsty Dowle (England)

19 November 2026
21:00

Barcelona (Spain)	6–0	(Switzerland) Servette Chênois
Bonmatí 18'; Pina 26', 77', 88'; Brugts 32'; Graham Hansen 62' (pen.)	Report

Johan Cruyff Stadium, Sant Joan Despí
Attendance: 2,005
Referee: Franziska Wildfeuer (Germany)

19 November 2026
21:00 (20:00 UTC+0)

Arsenal (England)	0–2	(France) OL Lyonnes
	Report	Brand 24'; Dumornay 57'

Meadow Park, Borehamwood
Attendance: 2,317
Referee: Silvia Gasperotti (Italy)

19 November 2026
21:00 (20:00 UTC+0)

Benfica (Portugal)	2–3	(Italy) Roma
Møller 40'; Sabastine 66'	Report	Van Dooren 17', 54'; Jahnukainen 90+3'

Estádio da Luz, Lisbon
Attendance: 3,082
Referee: Iuliana Demetrescu (Romania)

=== Matchday 6 ===
16 December 2026
21:00

OL Lyonnes (France)	v	(Sweden) BK Häcken
	Report

Parc Olympique Lyonnais, Décines-Charpieu

16 December 2026
21:00

Bayern Munich (Germany)	v	(Spain) Barcelona
	Report

Sportpark Unterhaching, Unterhaching

16 December 2026
21:00

Paris Saint-Germain (France)	v	(Italy) Juventus
	Report

Parc des Princes, Paris

16 December 2026
21:00

Roma (Italy)	v	(Spain) Real Madrid
	Report

Stadio Tre Fontane, Rome

16 December 2026
21:00 (20:00 UTC+0)

Manchester City (England)	v	Austria Wien
	Report

Academy Stadium, Manchester

16 December 2026
21:00

OH Leuven (Belgium)	v	(England) Chelsea
	Report

Den Dreef, Leuven

16 December 2026
21:00

HB Køge (Denmark)	v	(Portugal) Benfica
	Report

Køge Stadium, Køge

16 December 2026
21:00

Inter Milan (Italy)	v	(England) Arsenal
	Report

Brianteo, Monza

16 December 2026
21:00

Servette Chênois (Switzerland)	v	(France) Paris FC
	Report

Stade de Genève, Lancy
