= 2024–25 Bulgarian Women's League =

Bulgarian Women's League
- Season: 2024–25
- Dates: 30 August 2024 – 31 May 2025
- Champions: NSA Sofia
- Champions League: NSA Sofia
- Matches: 132
- Goals: 602 (4.56 per match)
- Top goalscorer: Polina Rasina (40 goals)
- All statistics correct as of 31 May 2025.

The 2024–25 Bulgarian Women's League is the 32nd season of the Bulgarian Women's League, the top-level women's football league in Bulgaria.

NSA Sofia are the defending champions, having claimed their 19th title last season.

== Teams ==
2024–25 Bulgarian Women's League teams

Twelve teams will contest the 2024–25 Women's League season.

Team	Location	Ground	Capacity	2023–24 season
Dunav Ruse	Ruse	Dunav Stadium	13,000	11th
Enko	Plovdiv	Plovdiv Stadium	1,000	10th
Etar VT	Veliko Tarnovo	Ivaylo Stadium	25,000	9th
Lokomotiv	Stara Zagora	Lokomotiv Stadium	2,000	2nd
LP Super Sport	Sofia	Stadion Letishte	3,000	5th
Ludogorets 1945	Razgrad	Gnezdo na Orli Complex	2,000	7th
NSA Sofia	Sofia	NSA Stadium	1,000	1st
Pirin 22	Blagoevgrad	Stadion selo Riltsi	1,000	8th
Pladin	Plovdiv	Paldin Stadium	1,000	4th
Sevlievo Ladies	Sevlievo	Rakovski Stadium	5,000	6th
Sofia Ladies 2021	Sofia	Stadion Vladaia	5,000	12th
Sportika	Blagoevgrad	Stadion selo Riltsi	1,000	3rd

=== Personnel and kits ===
Team	Manager	Captain	Kit manufacturer	Shirt sponsor
Dunav Ruse	(Bulgaria) Aleksandar Marinov	(Bulgaria) Lora Atanasova		
Enko	(Bulgaria) Ilia Kunov	(Bulgaria) Ivanka Dimitrova	Krasko	
Etar VT	(Bulgaria) Valentin Vitanov	(Bulgaria) Spasimira Evstatieva	Joma	efbet
Lokomotiv	(Bulgaria) Diana Dineva	(Bulgaria) Maria Dikelova		
LP Super Sport	(Bulgaria) Desislava Grahlyova	(Bulgaria) Vivian Orlyova		
Ludogorets 1945	(Bulgaria) Elena Doncheva	(Bulgaria) Viktoria Genova	Jako	Navibulgar
NSA Sofia	(Bulgaria) Valentina Gospodinova	(Australia) Jessica Coates	Jako	
Pirin 22	(Bulgaria) Izabel Barakova	(Bulgaria) Kristin Kachulska		
Pladin	(Bulgaria) Angel Slavov	(Bulgaria) Diana-Mihaela Atanasova		eat & go
Sevlievo Ladies	(Bulgaria) Yoana Dzhambazova	(Bulgaria) Vili Karadakova		
Sofia Ladies 2021	(Bulgaria) Martin Iliev	(Bulgaria) Nikol Ilieva		
Sportika	(Bulgaria) Radoslav Kresnichki	(Bulgaria) Milena Karakoleva		

== League table ==
Pos	Team	Pld	W	D	L	GF	GA	GD	Pts	Qualification
1	NSA Sofia	22	19	2	1	133	10	+123	59	Qualification for the UEFA Women's Champions League
2	Sportika	22	17	1	4	84	23	+61	52	
3	Lokomotiv	22	14	4	4	65	15	+50	46	
4	Ludogorets 1945	22	13	4	5	68	30	+38	43	
5	Paldin	22	12	2	8	45	32	+13	38	
6	Sevlievo Ladies	22	11	4	7	45	21	+24	37	
7	Pirin 22	22	11	2	9	55	42	+13	35	
8	LP Super Sport	22	8	5	9	27	38	−11	29	
9	Etar VT	22	6	2	14	37	61	−24	20	
10	Dunav Ruse	22	4	2	16	14	57	−43	14	
11	Enko	22	3	0	19	18	89	−71	9	
12	Sofia Ladies 2021	22	0	0	22	11	184	−173	0	

Updated to match(es) played on 31 May 2025. Source: Women's Football League Table
Rules for classification: Tiebreakers

=== Tiebreakers ===
Teams are ranked according to points (3 points for a win, 1 point for a draw, 0 points for a loss). If two or more teams are tied on points, the following tiebreaking criteria are applied, in the order given, to determine the rankings

1. Points in head-to-head matches among the tied teams;
2. Goal difference in head-to-head matches among the tied teams;
3. Goals scored in head-to-head matches among the tied teams;
4. If more than two teams were tied, and after applying all head-to-head criteria above, a subset of teams are still tied, all head-to-head criteria above are reapplied exclusively to this subset of teams;
5. Goal difference in all group matches;
6. Goals scored in all group matches;
7. Away goals scored in all group matches;
8. Wins in all group matches;
9. Away wins in all group matches;
10. Disciplinary points (direct red card = 3 points; double yellow card = 3 points; single yellow card = 1 point);

== Results ==
The fixtures for the first half of the league were published on 29 August 2024.

Home \ Away	NSA	SPO	LUD	SEV	PIR	LOK	LPS	PAL	ETA	ENK	DUN	SOF
NSA Sofia		8–0	4–0	4–0	2–0	3–1	7–1	1–1	3–0	18–0	7–0	23–1
Sportika	1–2		2–1	1–2	4–2	3–1	4–0	2–0	2–1	8–0	4–0	14–0
Ludogorets 1945	1–6	0–2		2–1	4–1	0–0	4–0	3–3	7–1	5–1	4–0	10–0
Sevlievo Ladies	0–0	0–0	1–0		6–1	2–2	1–0	1–2	4–2	5–0	2–0	7–0
Pirin 22	1–6	1–4	2–2	2–1		2–0	1–2	1–2	6–0	5–0	1–0	7–0
Lokomotiv	2–0	2–1	0–0	2–0	3–0		0–0	2–3	7–0	3–0	4–1	13–0
LP Super Sport	0–2	0–4	1–4	0–0	1–1	0–4		2–1	2–1	1–0	0–0	5–0
Paldin	0–6	1–3	2–3	0–1	1–2	0–3	1–0		1–0	3–1	1–0	4–1
Etar VT	1–4	1–4	2–3	2–1	1–2	0–2	2–2	0–4		2–0	0–0	5–1
Enko	0–8	0–7	0–1	0–2	2–6	0–3	1–2	0–4	1–2		3–0	6–1
Dunav Ruse	0–5	0–2	1–3	1–0	0–4	0–3	0–2	0–4	1–7	1–0		6–0
Sofia Ladies 2021	0–14	1–2	0–11	0–8	1–7	0–8	0–6	0–5	2–7	2–3	1–3	

Updated to match(es) played on 31 May 2025. Source: Women's League Results and Fixtures
Legend: Blue = home team win; Yellow = draw; Red = away team win.

== Season statistics ==
=== Top scorers ===
As of 31 May 2025

Rank	Player	Club	Goals
1	(Bulgaria) Polina Rasina	NSA Sofia	40
2	(Bulgaria) Monika Baliova	Sportika	33
3	(Bulgaria) Polina Demirova	NSA Sofia	24
4	(Bulgaria) Mariela Petrova	Ludogorets	22
5	(Bulgaria) Vasilena Stefanova	Sportika	21
6	(Bulgaria) Mirela Moeva	Etar VT	19
7	(Bulgaria) Silvia Naydenova	NSA Sofia	14
8	(Bulgaria) Raya Boneva	Lokomotiv	14
9	(Australia) Jessica Coates	NSA Sofia	12
10	(Bulgaria) Katerina Ravnachka	Ludogorets	12
11	(Bulgaria) Ivelina Pavlova	NSA Sofia	12

=== Clean sheets ===
As of 24 November 2024

Rank	Player	Club	Clean Sheets
1	(Bulgaria) Lora Rusanina	Lokomotiv	5
2	(Bulgaria) Viktoria Simova	Sevlievo ladies	4
2	(Bulgaria) Milena Karakoleva	Sportika	4
4	(Bulgaria) Viktoria Dimova	NSA Sofia	3
4	(Bulgaria) Martina Ilieva	Ludogorets	3
4	(Bulgaria) Mayya Staneva	LP Super Sport	3
4	(Bulgaria) Teodora Tsareva	Pirin 22	3
8	(Bulgaria) Lora Atanasova	Dunav ot Ruse	2
8	(Bulgaria) Aleksandra Hristova	Lokomotiv	2
8	(Bulgaria) Anabel Nikolova	NSA Sofia	2
11	Seven players		1

=== Hat-tricks ===
Player	Club	Against	Result	Date
(Bulgaria) Raya Boneva	Lokomotiv	Sofia ladies	8–0 (A)	1 September 2024
(Bulgaria) Denitsa Semkova	Pirin	Sofia ladies	7–1 (A)	8 September 2024
(Bulgaria) Ivelina Pavlova	NSA Sofia	Sofia ladies	23–1 (H)	14 September 2024
(Australia) Jessica Coates	NSA Sofia	Sofia ladies	23–1 (H) ^{(4)}	14 September 2024
(Bulgaria) Preslava Yordanova	NSA Sofia	Sofia ladies	23–1 (H)	14 September 2024
(Bulgaria) Polina Rasina	NSA Sofia	Sofia ladies	23–1 (H) ^{(4)}	14 September 2024
(Bulgaria) Polina Rasina	NSA Sofia	Paldin	6–0 (A) ^{(4)}	16 November 2024
(Bulgaria) Polina Demirova	NSA Sofia	Pirin	6–1 (A)	21 September 2024
(Bulgaria) Polina Demirova	NSA Sofia	Enko	8–0 (A) ^{(4)}	3 November 2024
(Bulgaria) Katerina Ravnachka	Ludogorets	Etar VT	7–1 (H)	21 September 2024
(Bulgaria) Katerina Ravnachka	Ludogorets	Sofia Ladies	11–0 (A) ^{(4)}	10 November 2024
(Bulgaria) Monika Baliova	Sportika	LP Super Sport	4–0 (A)	21 September 2024
(Bulgaria) Monika Baliova	Sportika	Sofia Ladies	14–0 (A) ^{(4)}	29 September 2024
(Bulgaria) Monika Baliova	Sportika	Pirin	4–1 (A)	5 October 2024
(Bulgaria) Vasilena Stefanova	Sportika	Sofia Ladies	14–0 (A)	29 September 2024
(Bulgaria) Maria Rikeva	Sportika	Sofia Ladies	14–0 (A)	29 September 2024
(Bulgaria) Mirela Moeva	Etar VT	Sofia Ladies	7–2 (A) ^{(4)}	5 October 2024
(Bulgaria) Mariela Petrova	Ludogorets	LP Super Sport	4–0 (H)	3 November 2024
(Bulgaria) Iveta Andreycheva	Sportika	Enko	7–0 (A)	17 November 2024

- ^{4} Player scored four goals

=== Discipline ===
As of 24 November 2024

	(yellow card) Most yellow cards	Total	(red card) Most red cards	Total
Player	(Bulgaria) Emili Damyanova (Pirin) (Bulgaria) Nedred Zastrug (Etar VT)	4	(Bulgaria) Demet Ahmedova (Dunav Ruse) (Ukraine) Oleksandra Babiuk (Lokomotiv) (Bulgaria) Simona Spirova (LP Super Sport) (Bulgaria) Izabel Barakova (Pirin) (Bulgaria) Kristiyana Dimitrova (Paldin) (Bulgaria) Anna Valcheva (Sofia Ladies 2021) (Bulgaria) Tsveta Dimitrova (Sofia Ladies 2021) (Bulgaria) Tsvetelina Ivanova (Sofia Ladies 2021)	1
Club	Sevlievo Ladies	18	Sofia Ladies 2021	3
