= Anna Szymańska =

Polish footballer

Personal information
- Date of birth: 5 December 1988 (age 37)
- Place of birth: Szczecin, Poland
- Position: Goalkeeper

Senior career*
Years	Team	Apps	(Gls)
1999–2002	Roma Szczecin		
2002–2007	Gryf Szczecin		
2007–2008	Medyk Konin		
2008–2010	Gryf Szczecin		
2010–2011	Pogoń Szczecin		
2012–2017	Medyk Konin		
2017–2023	Czarni Sosnowiec	112	(0)
2024–2025	MKS Myszków	1	(0)

International career
2011–2022	Poland	39	(0)
- * Club domestic league appearances and goals

Anna Szymańska (born 5 December 1988) is a Polish former professional footballer who played as a goalkeeper. She earned 39 caps for the Poland national team.

== Career ==
Szymańska has been capped for the Poland national team, appearing for the team during the 2019 FIFA Women's World Cup qualifying cycle.

== Career statistics ==
=== International ===
Appearances and goals by national team and year
National team	Year	Apps	Goals
Poland	2011	1	0
Poland	2013	2	0
Poland	2014	5	0
Poland	2015	5	0
Poland	2016	7	0
Poland	2017	6	0
Poland	2018	5	0
Poland	2019	3	0
Poland	2020	1	0
Poland	2021	3	0
Poland	2022	1	0
Total		39	0

== Honours ==
Medyk Konin

- Ekstraliga: 2013–14, 2014–15, 2015–16
- Polish Cup: 2007–08, 2012–13, 2013–14, 2014–15, 2015–16, 2016–17

Czarni Sosnowiec

- Ekstraliga: 2020–21
- Polish Cup: 2020–21, 2021–22
