= Anna Propošina =

Latvian footballer

Personal information
- Date of birth: 28 November 1990 (age 35)
- Position: Defender

Senior career*
Years	Team	Apps	(Gls)
2011–2012	Pogoń Szczecin	25	(0)
2012–2013	Skonto/Cerība		
- Liepāja

International career
2007–2008	Latvia U17	5	(0)
2011–2020	Latvia	36	(0)
- * Club domestic league appearances and goals as of 19:21, 8 April 2025 (UTC)

Anna Propošina (born 28 November 1990) is a Latvian footballer who plays as a defender and has appeared for the Latvia women's national team.

== Career ==
From 2011 to 2012, Propošina played for Polish club Pogoń Szczecin, where she made 25 top-flight appearances. She has been capped for the Latvia national team, appearing for the team during the 2019 FIFA Women's World Cup qualifying cycle.
