= WFC Ludogorets Razgrad =

- Full name: Women Football Club Ludogorets Razgrad
- Nickname: The Eagles
- Founded: 26 August 2023; 3 years ago
- Ground: Eagles' Nest, Razgrad
- Capacity: 2,000
- Owner: Kiril Domuschiev
- Chairman: Aleksandar Aleksandrov
- Manager: Hristos Dokov
- League: Bulgarian Women's League
- 2025–26: 1st (champions)
- Website: https://www.ludogorets.com/bg/
Home colours	Away colours	Third colours

Women Football Club Ludogorets Razgrad (Bulgarian: Женски Футболен Клуб Лудогорец Разград), or simple WFC Ludogorets (Bulgarian: ЖФК Лудогорец) is a Bulgarian women's football club from the city of Razgrad that competes in the Bulgarian Women's League, the top tier of Women's football in Bulgaria.

== History ==
On 26 August 2023 WFC Varna was bought by Ludogorets Razgrad owners and was transformed into the woman's team of Ludogorets. The team was officially presented on 29 August with having almost all footballers and staff from WFC Varna. In their league debut on 10 September 2023, they made a 2:2 draw against Sevlievo Ladies. The team finished their first season on 7th position.

== Honours ==
Bulgarian Women's League

- : Winners (1): 2025–26

Bulgarian Women's Cup

- : Winners (1): 2025–26

== Players ==
=== First-team squad ===
As of 30 June 2026

Note: Flags indicate national team as defined under FIFA eligibility rules; some limited exceptions apply. Players may hold more than one non-FIFA nationality.

No.	Pos.	Nation	Player
3	DF	BUL	Bianka Demirova
4	MF	BUL	Monika Borislavova
5	DF	BUL	Nora Dimitrova
6	DF	BUL	Silviya Kefalova
7	MF	BUL	Nikol Boyadzhiyan
8	DF	BUL	Tereza Popova
9	MF	BUL	Ivayla Polihronova
10	MF	BUL	Viktoriya Genova (captain)
11	DF	BUL	Aleksandra Vasileva
12	FW	AUT	Vanessa Gajdek
13	GK	BUL	Gabriela Genova
17	FW	BUL	Iv Deskova
19	MF	BUL	Nadezhda Ivanova

No.	Pos.	Nation	Player
22	DF	BUL	Teodora Todorova
27	FW	BUL	Burchin Bilyal
29	FW	BUL	Antonina Shopska
30	MF	BUL	Eva Atanasova
32	MF	BUL	Veronika Gotseva
66	DF	BUL	Tatyana Radoeva
71	FW	BUL	Mariela Petrova
73	FW	BUL	Polina Demirova
78	FW	BUL	Monika Baliova
88	GK	BUL	Martina Ilieva
96	MF	BUL	Viktoriya Tsvetkova
99	FW	ESP	Júlia Aguado

== Seasons ==
As of 27 May 2026

Season	League									Bulgarian Cup	Other competitions		Top goalscorer	
Season	Pld	W	D	L	GF	GA	GD	Pts	Pos	Bulgarian Cup	Other competitions		Top goalscorer	
2023–24	22	8	3	11	47	39	+8	27	7th	Not held	—N/a	—N/a	(Austria) Vanessa Gajdek	20
2024–25	22	13	4	5	68	30	+38	43	4th	Not held	—N/a	—N/a	(Bulgaria) Mariela Petrova	22
2025–26	22	21	1	0	132	3	+129	64	1st	Winners	—N/a	—N/a	(Bulgaria) Monika Baliova	32
2026–27	TBD	TBD	TBD	TBD	TBD	TBD	TBD	TBD	TBD	Qualified	UEFA Women's Champions League	Qua	TBD	TBD

== International record ==
Season	Competition	Round	Opponent	Score	Result
2026–27	UEFA Women's Champions League	First qualifying round	(Faroe Islands) KÍ Klaksvík	3–0	
2026–27	UEFA Women's Champions League	First qualifying round	(Kosovo) Mitrovica		

== Personnel ==
=== Manager history ===
Name	Years	First League	Bulgarian Cup	Titles
(Bulgaria) Elena Peeva	2023–2026	—N/a	—N/a	—N/a
(Bulgaria) Hristos Dokov	2026–	2025–26	2025–26	2

=== Current technical body ===
Position	Name
Head coach	(Bulgaria) Hristos Dokov
Assistant coach	(Bulgaria) Rosen Marinov
Goalkeeper coach	(Bulgaria) Dobrin Dobrev
Conditioning coach	(Bulgaria) Detelin Maslov
Doctor	(Bulgaria) Ivaylo Yakimov
