= Marlena Kowalik =

German–Polish footballer

Personal information
- Date of birth: 9 June 1984 (age 42)
- Place of birth: Homberg, Hesse, West Germany
- Height: 1.73 m (5 ft 8 in)
- Position: Midfielder

Youth career
- FC Homberg
- FSV Rengshausen
- SG Gilsa Jesberg
- Duisburg

Senior career*
Years	Team	Apps	(Gls)
2003–2006	Duisburg	23	(3)
2006–2011	Essen-Schönebeck	59	(4)
2011–2012	Pogoń Szczecin	1	(0)

International career
	Germany U17	4	(?)
2009–2012	Poland	17	(0)
- * Club domestic league appearances and goals

Marlena Kowalik (born 9 June 1984) is a German-born Polish former footballer who played as a midfielder. She has been a member of the Poland women's national team.

== Club career ==
Kowalik has played for FCR Duisburg and SG Essen-Schönebeck in the German Bundesliga and for Pogoń Szczecin in the Polish Esktraliga.

== Career statistics ==
=== International ===
Appearances and goals by national team and year
National team	Year	Apps	Goals
Poland	2009	10	0
Poland	2010	4	0
Poland	2011	2	0
Poland	2012	1	0
Total		17	0
