= Pogoń Szczecin (women) =

Polish football club

- Founded: 2002; 24 years ago
- Ground: Centrum Szkolenia Dzieci i Młodzieży, Krygier Stadium
- Capacity: 709
- Chairman: vacant
- Manager: Martin Masaryk
- League: Ekstraliga
- 2025–26: Ekstraliga, 2nd of 12
Home colours	Away colours	Third colours

Pogoń Szczecin is a women's football club from Szczecin, Poland, the women's section of Pogoń Szczecin. One-time league champions, they currently compete in the Ekstraliga, the country's top division.

== History ==
The team was founded as TKKF Gryf Szczecin.

The team reached the Ekstraliga for the first time in 2010. In its debut season in the top division Gryf finished 4th, and it subsequently became Pogoń's women team. It has been successful in the national cup, reaching the final for three seasons in a row between 2009 and 2011. In them Gryf lost once to AZS Wrocław and twice to Unia Racibórz.

The team was dissolved after the 2012–13 season. In 2022, the women's football section of Pogoń Szczecin was reactivated by merging the former women's club Olimpia Szczecin with Pogoń Szczecin. It won its first Polish Championship title in the 2023–24 season.

== Honours ==
- Ekstraliga
  - Champions: 2023–24
  - Runners-up: 2025–26
- Polish Cup
  - Runners-up: 2008–09, 2009–10, 2010–11

== Players ==
=== Current squad ===
As of 2 November 2026

Note: Flags indicate national team as defined under FIFA eligibility rules; some limited exceptions apply. Players may hold more than one non-FIFA nationality.

No.	Pos.	Nation	Player
1	GK	CRO	Nika Radolović
4	DF	SUI	Laura Felber
5	MF	CZE	Kateřina Kotrčová
6	MF	USA	Isabella Cook
7	MF	BUL	Eva Atanasova
8	MF	MEX	Jazmin Castano
9	MF	SVK	Laura Žemberyová
10	MF	USA	Kyah Le
12	FW	USA	Erin Ewers
13	MF	POL	Hanna Woźniak
14	DF	POL	Alicja Dyguś
15	DF	POL	Laura Urman
16	MF	POL	Wiktoria Zgrzeba

No.	Pos.	Nation	Player
17	MF	POL	Oliwia Grewling
18	DF	POL	Zuzanna Radochońska
19	MF	GRE	Griselda Tsela
20	MF	POL	Maja Leśkiewicz
21	MF	POL	Blanka Zając
22	MF	POL	Maja Sztramska
26	GK	CZE	Tereza Fuchsová
29	MF	POL	Lena Świrska
30	FW	POL	Julia Dębowska
33	MF	POL	Karolina Łaniewska
77	FW	SVK	Lenka Mazúchová
98	FW	ROU	Bianca Ienovan
99	MF	TUR	Derya Arhan

=== Notable players ===
Had international caps for their respective countries at any time.

Poland

- (Poland) Patrycja Balcerzak
- (Poland) Martyna Brodzik
- (Poland) Daria Kasperska
- (Poland) Marlena Kowalik
- (Poland) Natalia Oleszkiewicz
- (Poland) Natalia Radkiewicz
- (Poland) Jolanta Siwińska
- (Poland) Anna Szymańska
- (Poland) Emilia Zdunek

Greece

- (Greece) Matina Ntarzanou
- (Greece) Androniki Michalopoulou

Latvia

- (Latvia) Jūlija Levčenko
- (Latvia) Anastasija Poļuhoviča
- (Latvia) Anna Propošina

Nigeria

- (Nigeria) Florence Ajayi

Slovenia

- (Slovenia) Luana Zajmi

South Korea

- (South Korea) Choi Da-kyung

== Club statistics ==
Season	League	Place	W	D	L	GF	GA	Pts	Polish Cup
2002–03	II liga, grupa: wielkopolska (II)	6	3	0	17	29	138	9	
2003–04	II liga, grupa: wielkopolska (II)	6	5	2	9	23	52	17	
2004–05	II liga, grupa: wielkopolska (II)	4	4	2	4	20	24	14	
2005–06	II liga, grupa: wielkopolska (III)	2	7	1	2	22	8	22	Round of 32
2006–07	II liga, grupa: zachodniopomorska (III)	1	10	0	0	46	8	30	round of 16
2007–08	I liga, grupa: północna (II)	6	5	3	6	17	23	18	
2008–09	I liga, grupa: zachodnia (II)	2	9	2	3	43	17	29	Runners-up
2009–10	I liga, grupa: północna (II)	1	13	1	1	64	8	40	Runners-up
2010–11	Ekstraliga (I)	4	10	3	5	29	21	33	Runners-up
2011–12	Ekstraliga (I)	4	10	2	6	43	16	32	Round of 16
2012–13	Ekstraliga (I)	10 (Note: Pogoń withdrew from the competition after the 10th round.)	5	1	12	12	37	16	Round of 16
2022–23	Ekstraliga (I)	5	12	1	9	42	30	37	Semi-finals
2023–24	Ekstraliga (I)	1	16	3	3	63	16	51	Round of 32
2024–25	Ekstraliga (I)	3	17	0	5	60	20	51	Runners-up
2025–26	Ekstraliga (I)	2	16	3	3	60	18	51	Semi-finals
Green marks a season followed by promotion, red a season followed by relegation.
