= Vanessa Gajdek =

Austrian footballer

Personal information
- Full name: Vanessa Angelika Gajdek
- Date of birth: 15 September 2005 (age 21)
- Position: Midfielder

Team information
- Current team: Rheindorf Altach
- Number: 12

Youth career
- FFC Vorderland

Senior career*
Years	Team	Apps	(Gls)
2020–2022	Altach/Vorderland	23	(0)
2022–2023	WFC Varna		
2023–2026	Ludogorets Razgrad		
2026–	Rheindorf Altach	1	(0)
- * Club domestic league appearances and goals as of 06:29, 24 June 2024 (UTC)

Vanessa Gajdek (born 14 September 2005) is an Austrian footballer who plays as a midfielder for Rheindorf Altach.

== Career ==
Gajdek started her career at FFC Vorderland and was promoted to first team in 2020 playing in ÖFB Frauen Bundesliga.

In 2022 she moved to Bulgaria and joined WFC Varna. In 2023 the team was merged and become Ludogorets Razgrad, were Gajdek was also transferred. She scored her first hattrick for the team in a league match against Dunav Ruse. Six days later she scored two goals against Sportika Blagoevgrad, helping her team to return in match from 4–2 deficit to a 5–4 win.
