= Daria Kasperska =

Polish footballer

Personal information
- Full name: Daria Kasperska
- Date of birth: 27 September 1983 (age 43)
- Place of birth: Poland
- Position: Midfielder

Senior career*
Years	Team	Apps	(Gls)
- Czarni Sosnowiec
2005–2006	Gol Częstochowa		
2006–2010	Unia Racibórz		
2010–2013	Pogoń Szczecin		
2013–2014	Unia Racibórz		
2014–2018	Rolnik Głogówek		
2018–2021	SWD Wodzisław Śląski	48	(9)
2021–2022	ROW Rybnik	15	(0)
2024	Zorza Pęgów	0	(0)

International career
	Poland U18	1	(0)
	Poland U19	6	(0)
2004–2010	Poland	40	(0)
- * Club domestic league appearances and goals

Daria Kasperska (born 27 September 1983) is a Polish former professional footballer who played as a midfielder. She previously played for Czarni Sosnowiec, Gol Częstochowa and Unia Racibórz, playing the Champions League with Unia.

She has been a member of the Polish national team.

== Career statistics ==
=== International ===
Appearances and goals by national team and year
National team	Year	Apps	Goals
Poland	2004	6	0
Poland	2005	3	0
Poland	2006	2	0
Poland	2007	5	0
Poland	2008	7	0
Poland	2009	9	0
Poland	2010	8	0
Total		40	0

== Honours ==
Unia Racibórz

- Ekstraliga: 2008–09, 2009–10
- Polish Cup: 2009–10
