= Eva Atanasova =

Bulgarian footballer (born 2005)

Personal information
- Full name: Eva Yordanova Atanasova
- Date of birth: 5 June 2005 (age 21)
- Position: Midfielder

Team information
- Current team: Pogoń Szczecin
- Number: 7

Youth career
- Sportika Blagoevgrad

Senior career*
Years	Team	Apps	(Gls)
2022–2023	Carmen București		
2023–2024	Ludogorets Razgrad	18	(3)
2024–2025	Zulte Waregem		
2025–2026	Ludogorets Razgrad	18	(5)
2026–	Pogoń Szczecin	0	(0)

International career^{‡}
2022–2023	Bulgaria U17	2	(0)
2022–2024	Bulgaria U19	8	(0)
2023–	Bulgaria	4	(0)
- * Club domestic league appearances and goals as of 09:16, 30 March 2026 (UTC) ‡ National team caps and goals as of 08:21, 19 November 2025 (UTC)

Eva Yordanova Atanasova (Bulgarian: Ева Атанасова; born 5 June 2005) is a Bulgarian footballer who plays as a forward for Ekstraliga club Pogoń Szczecin and the Bulgaria women's national team.

== Career ==
Atanasova started her career at Sportika Blagoevgrad, before moving to the Romanian team Carmen București in July 2022. On 7 September 2023, she joined the newly formed Bulgarian Women's League club Ludogorets Razgrad. On 31 July 2024, she signed a one-year contract for Zulte Waregem in Belgium.

She spent the 2025–26 season back at Ludogorets, before signing a two-year contract with Polish club Pogoń Szczecin on 30 July 2026.

== International career ==
Atanasova capped for Bulgaria at senior level in a 2–0 friendly loss to Romania on 16 July 2023.
