= Júlia Aguado =

Spanish footballer (born 2000)

Julia Aguado
Personal information
- Full name: Julia Aguado Fernández
- Date of birth: 2 May 2000 (age 26)
- Place of birth: Picassent, Spain
- Position: Midfielder

Team information
- Current team: Ludogorets Razgrad
- Number: 99

Senior career*
| Years | Team | Apps | (Gls) |
| 2016–2021 | Valencia B | 25+ | (7+) |
| 2017–2022 | Valencia | 32 | (3) |
| 2022–2023 | Levante | 17 | (3) |
| 2023–2025 | Real Betis | 36 | (4) |
| 2025– | Ludogorets Razgrad | 0 | (0) |
- * Club domestic league appearances and goals as of 16:46, 24 November 2024 (UTC)

Julia Aguado Fernández (born 2 May 2000) is a Spanish footballer who plays as a midfielder for Ludogorets Razgrad. Her previous team was Real Betis.

== Club career ==
Aguado started her career at Valencia B, remaining at Valencia up to 2022.

On 20 July 2025 she moved to Bulgarian team Ludogorets Razgrad.
