= Veronika Gotseva =

Bulgarian female footballer

Personal information
- Date of birth: 29 May 1993 (age 33)
- Position: Forward

Team information
- Current team: Ludogorets Razgrad
- Number: 32

Senior career*
| Years | Team | Apps | (Gls) |
| –2014 | Biljanini Izvori | | |
| 2014–2020 | Paldin Plovdiv | | |
| 2020–2024 | Sportika Blagoevgrad | | |
| 2024–2025 | NSA Sofia | | |
| 2025– | Ludogorets Razgrad | 16 | (7) |

International career^{‡}
| 2008–2009 | Bulgaria U17 | 6 | (0) |
| 2009–2011 | Bulgaria U19 | 9 | (0) |
| 2014– | Bulgaria | 3 | (0) |
- * Club domestic league appearances and goals as of 09:19, 30 March 2026 (UTC) ‡ National team caps and goals as of 14 June 2019

Veronika Gotseva (Bulgarian: Вероника Гоцева; born 29 May 1993) is a Bulgarian footballer who plays as a forward for Ludogorets Razgrad and the Bulgaria women's national team.

== International career ==
Gotseva capped most recently for Bulgaria at senior level in a 0–6 friendly loss to Croatia on 14 June 2019.
