= Choi Da-kyung =

South Korean footballer (born 2000)

Personal information
- Full name: Choi Da-kyung
- Date of birth: 8 November 2000 (age 25)
- Place of birth: South Korea
- Height: 1.65 m (5 ft 5 in)
- Position: Striker

Team information
- Current team: Thonon Evian

Youth career
- 2016–2018: Ulsan Hyundai High School
- 2019–2020: Uiduk University

Senior career*
Years	Team	Apps	(Gls)
2021–2025	Mungyeong Sangmu		
2025–2026	Pogoń Szczecin	22	(8)
2026–	Thonon Evian	0	(0)

International career^{‡}
2019	South Korea U20	6	(0)
2025–	South Korea	4	(1)
- * Club domestic league appearances and goals as of 20:04, 2 June 2026 (UTC) ‡ National team caps and goals as of 15:05, 26 August 2025 (UTC)

Choi Da-kyung (Korean: 최다경; born 8 November 2000) is a South Korean professional footballer who plays as a striker for Seconde Ligue club Thonon Evian and the South Korea national team.

== Early life ==
As a teenager, Choi played for the football academy team at Hyundai High School. She went on to play for Uiduk University.

== Club career ==
Choi joined Mungyeong Sangmu, the women's football team of the Republic of Korea Armed Forces, in 2021. She retired from military service in 2025 and shortly afterwards signed a one-year contract with Ekstraliga club Pogoń Szczecin.

On 10 August 2026, Choi signed with French second division side Thonon Evian.

== International career ==
Choi played for the South Korea U20 team in the 2019 AFC U-19 Women's Championship. She received her first senior call-up in 2025, representing South Korea at the Pink Ladies Cup in the United Arab Emirates, and scoring her debut international goal in a 3–0 victory against India.
