= Sofia Ladies 2021 =

FC Sofia Ladies 2021
- Full name: Football Club Sofia Ladies 2021
- Founded: 28 June 2021; 3 years ago
- Ground: Stadion Akademik, Sofia
- Capacity: 2,000
- Manager: Martin Iliev
- League: Bulgarian Women's League
- 2024–25: 12th
- Website: https://fc-sofia-ladies-2021.eu/
Home colours	Away colours

Football Club Sofia Ladies 2021 (Bulgarian: Футболен Клуб София Лейдис 2021), or simple Sofia Ladies (Bulgarian: София Лейдис) is a Bulgarian women's football club from the city of Sofia that competes in the Bulgarian Women's League, the top tier of Women's football in Bulgaria.

== History ==
Sofia Ladies was founded on 28 July 2023 in order to make women's football more popular in Bulgaria. Only 3 months later they won a friendly tournament. They officially joined the Bulgarian Women's League in August 2022. In August 2023 they moved to Stadion Akademik stadium in Sofia.

== Players ==
=== First-team squad ===
As of 26 August 2023

Note: Flags indicate national team as defined under FIFA eligibility rules; some limited exceptions apply. Players may hold more than one non-FIFA nationality.

No.	Pos.	Nation	Player
3	DF	(Bulgaria) BUL	Kirilka Stanchova
4	DF	(Bulgaria) BUL	Tsveta Dimitrova
6	DF	(Bulgaria) BUL	Bozhidara Kostadinova
7	FW	(Bulgaria) BUL	Nicole Ilieva (captain)
8	MF	(Bulgaria) BUL	Denislava Valchinova
9	DF	(Bulgaria) BUL	Tsvetelina Ivanova
12	GK	(Bulgaria) BUL	Nia Yordanska

No.	Pos.	Nation	Player
15	MF	(Bulgaria) BUL	Donika Andonova
17	FW	(Bulgaria) BUL	Maria Spasova
16	DF	(Bulgaria) BUL	Veronika Sofronieva
18	MF	(Bulgaria) BUL	Nicole Velichkova
23	MF	(Bulgaria) BUL	Katerina Kupanova
30	MF	(Bulgaria) BUL	Rumina Ivanova

== Personnel ==
=== Manager history ===
Dates	Name	Honours
2022–	(Bulgaria) Martin Iliev	

== Seasons ==
Results of league and cup competitions by season
Season	League											Bulgarian Cup	Other competitions
Season	Division	Level	P	W	D	L	F	A	GD	Pts	Pos	Bulgarian Cup	Other competitions
2022–23	Bulgarian Women's League	1	24	3	1	20	27	167	–140	10	10th		
2023–24	Bulgarian Women's League	1	22	0	1	21	9	148	-139	1	12th		
2024–25	Bulgarian Women's League	1	22	0	0	22	11	184	-173	0	12th		

Key

Champions	Runners-up	Third place	Promoted	Relegated
