= Laia Ballesté =

Footballer (born 1999)

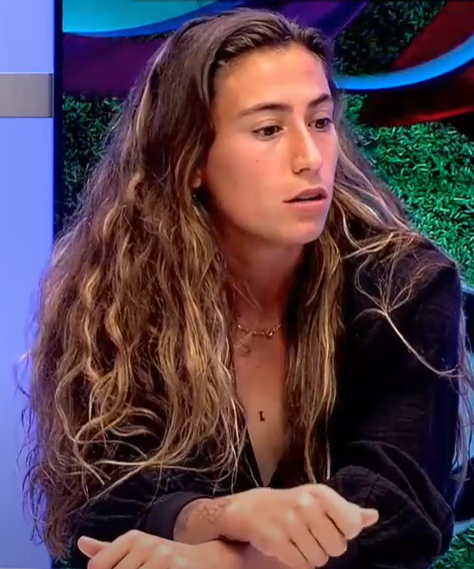

Personal information
- Full name: Laia Ballesté Sciora
- Date of birth: 22 February 1999 (age 27)
- Place of birth: L'Ampolla, Spain
- Height: 1.71 m (5 ft 7 in)
- Position: Defender

Team information
- Current team: Espanyol
- Number: 14

Youth career
- 2014–2016: Tortosa-Ebre
- 2016–2017: Joventut Almassora

Senior career*
| Years | Team | Apps | (Gls) |
| 2017–2019 | Valencia B | | |
| 2019–2020 | Alavés | 18 | (0) |
| 2020–2021 | Logroño | 19 | (1) |
| 2021–2022 | Rayo Vallecano | 28 | (1) |
| 2022–2024 | Sporting Huelva | 50 | (5) |
| 2024– | Espanyol | 24 | (0) |

International career^{‡}
| 2025– | Switzerland | 2 | (0) |
- * Club domestic league appearances and goals ‡ National team caps and goals as of 2 December 2025

Laia Ballesté Sciora (born 22 February 1999) is a professional footballer who plays as a defender for Liga F club Espanyol. Born in Spain, she also holds Swiss citizenship and represents Switzerland at international level.

== Club career ==
After playing with Valencia's B team and spending a season with Alavés, Ballesté signed for EdF Logroño in 2020, her first experience in Spain's top division. She made her debut in the Copa de la Reina in the delayed semi-final of the 2019–20 edition, playing all 120 minutes as the club defeated Athletic Bilbao to reach the final. Logroño were defeated 3–0 by FC Barcelona in the final. She made 19 appearances and scored one goal as the club were relegated at the end of the season.

On 23 August 2021, Ballesté signed for Rayo Vallecano.

== International career ==
Born in Spain, Ballesté is of Swiss descent through her mother. She prefers to play for the Switzerland national team. On 30 June 2025, Ballesté was named to Switzerland's squad for UEFA Women's Euro 2025 as a late replacement for the injured Luana Bühler.
