= 2025–26 Montenegrin Women's League =

Montenegrin Women's League
- Season: 2025–26
- Dates: 12 September 2025 – 17 May 2026
- Country: Montenegro
- Teams: 7
- Matches: 45
- Goals: 311 (6.91 per match)
- All statistics correct as of 17 May 2025.

The 2025–26 Montenegrin Women's League (also known as 1.ŽFL) was the 18th season since the establishment of the Montenegrin Women's League. The season began on 12 September 2025.

== Format of Competition ==
A total of 6 teams participate in this edition of the Women's League, it was originally 7 but Zora withdrew from the league before the season started. There are no new teams from the last season but the teams that won't participate in this season but did last season are Adrenalin and Ilarion.

Each team will play each other 3 times and will either play 1 or 2 home games against a different team. The winner of the league qualifies for the UEFA Women's Champions League first qualifying round.

== League table ==
Pos	Team	Pld	W	D	L	GF	GA	GD	Pts	Promotion or relegation
1	Budućnost	15	14	1	0	117	5	+112	43	Qualification to the UEFA Women's Champions League first qualifying round
2	Breznica	15	10	2	3	81	22	+59	32	
3	Ekonomist	15	10	0	5	63	27	+36	30	
4	Mladost	15	3	3	9	19	55	−36	12	
5	Gorica	15	3	2	10	23	73	−50	11	
6	Cvetex	15	1	0	14	8	129	−121	3	
7	Zora (Note: Zora withdrew from the league at the beginning of the season.)	0	0	0	0	0	0	0	0	Withdrew before season

Updated to match(es) played on 17 May 2026. Source: Football Association of Montenegro (in Montenegrin)
Rules for classification: 1) Points; 2) Head-to-head points; 3) Head-to-head goal difference; 3) Head-to-head goals scored; 5) Head-to-head away goals scored; 6) Goal difference; 7) Goals scored; 8) Draw.

== Results ==
=== First and second rounds ===
Home \ Away	BRE	BUD	CVE	EKO	GOR	MLA	ZOR (Note: Zora withdrew from the league before the season started)
Breznica	—	1–1	14–0	2–0	5–0	12–0	—
Budućnost	5–0	—	18–0	2–0	8–0	15–0	—
Cvetex	0–13	0–12	—	0–7	1–4	2–1	—
Ekonomist	0–3	0–6	10–0	—	7–0	3–0	—
Gorica	1–7	0–11	8–1	2–3	—	1–1	—
Mladost	1–1	1–4	5–1	0–2	3–1	—	—
Zora	—	—	—	—	—	—	—

Updated to match(es) played on 17 May 2026. Source: Football Association of Montenegro (in Montenegrin)
Legend: Blue = home team win; Yellow = draw; Red = away team win.
For upcoming matches, an "a" indicates there is an article about the rivalry between the two participants.
