= Gloria Marinelli =

Italian footballer (born 1998)

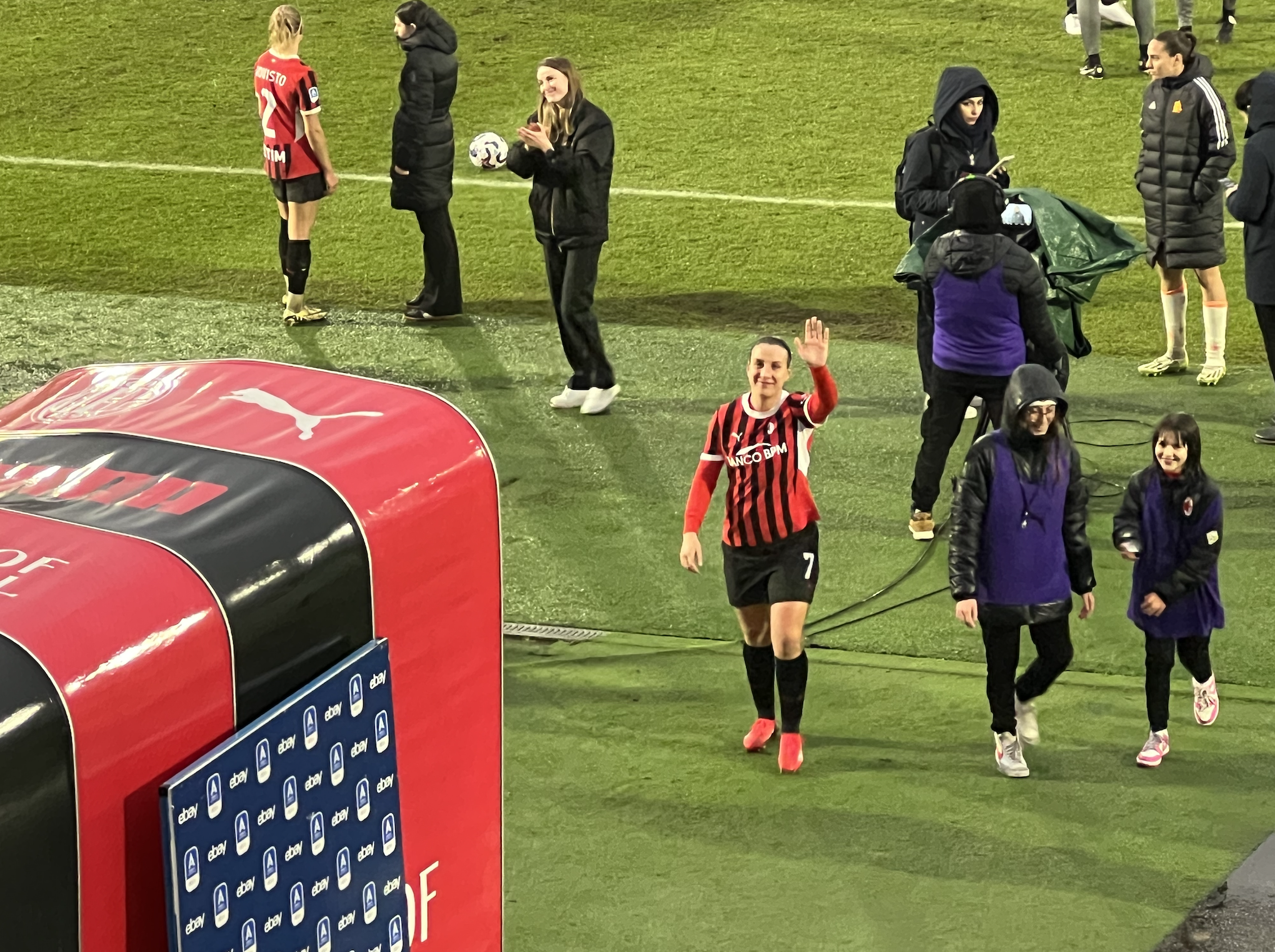
- Gloria Marinelli with AC Milan in 2025.

Personal information
- Date of birth: 12 March 1998 (age 28)
- Place of birth: Agnone, Italy
- Height: 1.68 m (5 ft 6 in)
- Position: Forward

Team information
- Current team: Servette
- Number: 9

Senior career*
| Years | Team | Apps | (Gls) |
| 2012–2016 | Grifo Perugia | 86 | (28) |
| 2016–2017 | Chieti | 22 | (7) |
| 2017–2018 | → Inter Milano (loan) | 24 | (11) |
| 2018–2023 | Inter Milan | 94 | (47) |
| 2023–2025 | AC Milan | 38 | (3) |
| 2025– | Servette | 12 | (7) |

International career^{‡}
| 2014–2015 | Italy U17 | 15 | (4) |
| 2015–2017 | Italy U19 | 12 | (4) |
| 2018–2019 | Italy U23 | 2 | (1) |
| 2019– | Italy | 2 | (0) |
- * Club domestic league appearances and goals as of 06:40, 21 December 2025 (UTC) ‡ National team caps and goals as of 19:22, 20 July 2021 (UTC)

Gloria Marinelli (born 12 March 1998) is an Italian professional footballer who plays as a forward for Swiss Women's Super League club Servette and the Italian national team.

== International career ==
Marinelli made her debut for the Italy national team on 4 October 2019 against Malta.

== Personal life ==
Marinelli's mother is called Giovanna and her father, Mauro, is a former footballer.
