= Slovak football clubs in European competitions =

Slovak football clubs have participated in European football competitions since 1956. Before 1993 Slovakia was a part of Czechoslovakia, therefore Slovak teams represented this country and did not always have a spot in European competitions.

All statistics and records are accurate as of 1 December 2020.

== Statistics ==
- Most European Cup/Champions League competitions appeared in: 17 – Slovan Bratislava
- Most Inter-Cities Fairs Cup/UEFA Cup/Europa League competitions appeared in: 23 – Slovan Bratislava
- Most UEFA Europa Conference League competitions appeared in: 5 – Trnava
- Most Cup Winners' Cup competitions appeared in: 7 – Slovan Bratislava
- Most Intertoto Cup competitions appeared in: 4 – Trenčín
- Most competitions appeared in overall: 43 – Slovan Bratislava
- First match played: Slovan Bratislava 4–0 CWKS Warsaw, 12 September 1956 (1956–57 European Cup, preliminary round)
- Most matches played: 222 – Slovan Bratislava
- Most match wins: 88 – Slovan Bratislava
- Most match draws: 54 – Slovan Bratislava
- Most match losses: 80 – Slovan Bratislava

- Biggest win (match): 10 goals:
  - Rabat Ajax 0–10 Inter Bratislava (1983–84 UEFA Cup first round)
- Biggest win (aggregate): 16 goals:
  - Inter Bratislava 16–0 Rabat Ajax (1983–84 UEFA Cup first round)
- Biggest defeat (match): 7 goals
  - Žilina 0–7 Marseille (2010–11 UEFA Champions League group stage)
  - LASK 7–0 DAC Dunajská Streda (2020–21 UEFA Europa League)
- Biggest defeat (aggregate): 9 goals, joint record:
  - Púchov 1–10 Bordeaux (2002–03 UEFA Cup first round)

== Appearances in UEFA competitions ==
Club	UEFA Champions League					UEFA Europa League (included Inter-Cities Fairs Cup)					UEFA Europa Conference League					UEFA Cup Winners' Cup					UEFA Intertoto Cup					Total					First Appearance	Last Appearance
Club	App.	P	W	D	L	App.	P	W	D	L	App.	P	W	D	L	App.	P	W	D	L	App.	P	W	D	L	App.	P	W	D	L	First Appearance	Last Appearance
Slovan Bratislava	17	68	22	18	28	23	96	39	25	32	3	24	9	7	8	7	29	15	4	10	1	4	3	0	1	43	222	88	54	80	1956–57 EC	2025–26 CL
Žilina	7	28	9	5	14	8	38	17	9	12	3	13	6	1	6	1	4	3	0	1	2	8	4	1	3	22	91	39	16	36	1961–62 CWC	2025–26 ECL
Spartak Trnava	6	30	15	9	6	15	68	28	17	23	5	27	7	9	11	4	12	4	2	6	3	12	5	3	4	30	149	60	40	40	1967–68 CWC	2025–26 ECL
Inter Bratislava	3	12	5	3	4	9	36	22	0	14						3	10	2	2	6						15	58	29	5	24	1959–60 EC	2001–02 UC
Petržalka	2	18	7	6	5	6	22	6	5	11											1	4	0	3	1	9	44	13	14	17	2001 IC	2008–09 UC
MFK Košice	2	14	6	1	7	8	22	7	4	11						1	4	3	0	1	1	4	2	2	0	12	44	18	7	19	1971–72 UC	2014–15 UEL
Trenčín	2	6	2	1	3	5	22	9	7	6											4	10	3	2	5	9	38	14	10	14	1999 IC	2018–19 UEL
Ružomberok	1	4	1	0	3	6	19	5	2	12	2	7	2	2	3											8	30	8	4	18	2001–02 UC	2024–25 UCL
DAC Dunajská Streda						5	17	3	4	10	4	12	5	0	7	1	4	3	0	1						11	33	11	4	18	1987–88 CWC	2024–25 UCL
Dukla Banská Bystrica						5	14	4	2	8																5	14	4	2	8	1984–85 UC	2010–11 UEL
Púchov						3	12	4	3	5																3	12	4	3	5	2001–02 UC	2003–04 UC
Senica						3	8	1	2	5																3	8	1	2	5	2011–12 UEL	2013–14 UEL
Nitra						2	4	0	1	3											2	6	4	0	2	4	10	4	1	5	1989–90 UC	2010–11 UEL
Tatran Prešov						1	4	1	1	2						2	8	3	1	4						3	12	4	2	6	1966–67 CWC	1994–95 CWC
Zlaté Moravce						1	4	1	1	2																1	4	1	1	2	2007–08 UC	2007–08 UC
Lokomotíva Košice						1	2	1	0	1						2	8	3	4	1						3	10	4	4	2	1977–78 CWC	1979–80 CWC
Spartak Myjava						1	2	0	1	1																1	2	0	1	1	2016–17 UEL	2016–17 UEL
Senec						1	2	0	0	2																1	2	0	0	2	2002–03 UC	2002–03 UC
FC Košice											1	0	0	0	0											1	0	0	0	0	2025–26 ECL	2025–26 ECL
Humenné																1	4	2	0	2						1	4	2	0	2	1996–97 CWC	1996–97 CWC
Dubnica																					3	14	6	2	6	3	14	6	2	6	2003 IC	2005 IC
Rimavská Sobota																					1	4	2	1	1	1	4	2	1	1	1998 IC	1998 IC

App. = Appearances; P = Matches played; W = Matches won; D = Matches drawn; L = Matches lost; Teams in italics currently do not play in the top division

As of 21 Jul 2025

== Slovak club distinctions in European competitions ==
=== European Cup / Champions League ===
Club	Champion	Finalist	Semi-Finalist	Quarter-Finalist
Spartak Trnava	–	–	1968–69	1972–73, 1973–74

=== Inter-Cities Fairs Cup/UEFA Cup/Europa League ===
Club	Champion	Finalist	Semi-Finalist	Quarter-Finalist
–	–	–	–	–

=== Europa Conference League ===
Club	Champion	Finalist	Semi-Finalist	Quarter-Finalist
–	–	–	–	–

=== Cup Winners' Cup ===
Club	Champion	Finalist	Semi-Finalist	Quarter-Finalist
Žilina	–	–	–	1961–62
Slovan Bratislava	1968–69	–	–	1962–63, 1963–64

== Active competitions ==
=== European Cup/Champions League ===
Season	Club	Round	Opponent	Home	Away	Agg
European Cup
1956–57	Slovan Bratislava	PR	(Poland) CWKS Warsaw	4–0	0–2	4–2
1956–57	Slovan Bratislava	1R	(Switzerland) Grasshopper Zürich	1–0	0–2	1–2
1959–60	Inter Bratislava	PR	(Portugal) Porto	2–1	2–0	4–1
1959–60	Inter Bratislava	R16	(Scotland) Rangers	1–1	3–4	4–5
1968–69	Spartak Trnava	1R	(Romania) Steaua București	4–0	1–3	5–3
1968–69	Spartak Trnava	2R	(Finland) Reipas Lahti	7–1	9–1	16–2
1968–69	Spartak Trnava	QF	(Greece) AEK Athens	2–1	1–1	3–2
1968–69	Spartak Trnava	SF	(Netherlands) Ajax	2–0	0–3	2–3
1969–70	Spartak Trnava	1R	(Scotland) Hibernians	4–0	2–2	6–2
1969–70	Spartak Trnava	2R	(Turkey) Galatasaray	1–0	0–1	1–1 (c/t)
1970–71	Slovan Bratislava	1R	(Denmark) Boldklubben 1903	2–1	2–2	4–3
1970–71	Slovan Bratislava	2R	(Greece) Panathinaikos	2–1	0–3	2–4
1971–72	Spartak Trnava	1R	(Romania) Dinamo Bucharest	2–2	0–0	2–2 (a)
1972–73	Spartak Trnava	2R	(Belgium) Anderlecht	1–0	1–0	2–0
1972–73	Spartak Trnava	QF	Derby County	1–0	0–2	1–2
1973–74	Spartak Trnava	1R	Viking	1–0	2–1	3–1
1973–74	Spartak Trnava	2R	(Soviet Union) Zorya Voroshilovgrad	0–0	1–0	1–0
1973–74	Spartak Trnava	QF	(Hungary) Újpesti Dózsa	1–1	1–1	2–2 (3–4 p)
1974–75	Slovan Bratislava	1R	(Belgium) Anderlecht	4–2	1–3	5–5 (a)
1975–76	Slovan Bratislava	1R	(England) Derby County	1–0	0–3	1–3
UEFA Champions League
1992–93	Slovan Bratislava	1R	(Hungary) Ferencváros	4–1	0–0	4–1
1992–93	Slovan Bratislava	2R	(Italy) Milan	0–1	0–4	0–5
1993–94	None					
1994–95	None					
1995–96	None					
1996–97	None					
1997–98	Košice	1QR	(Iceland) ÍA	3–0	1–0	4–0
1997–98	Košice	2QR	(Russia) Spartak Moscow	2–1	0–0	2–1
1997–98	Košice	G-B	(England) Manchester United	0–3	0–3	4th
1997–98	Košice	G-B	(Italy) Juventus	0–1	2–3	4th
1997–98	Košice	G-B	(Netherlands) Feyenoord	0–1	0–2	4th
1998–99	Košice	1QR	(Northern Ireland) Cliftonville	8–0	5–1	13–1
1998–99	Košice	2QR	(Denmark) Brøndby	0–2	1–0	1–2
1999–00	Slovan Bratislava	2QR	(Cyprus) Famagusta	1–1	1–2	2–3
2000–01	Inter Bratislava	2QR	(Finland) Haka	1–0	0–0	1–0 (e.t)
2000–01	Inter Bratislava	3QR	(France) Lyon	1–2	1–2	2–4
2001–02	Inter Bratislava	2QR	(Belarus) Slavia Mozyr	1–0	1–0	2–0
2001–02	Inter Bratislava	3QR	(Norway) Rosenborg	3–3	0–4	3–7
2002–03	Žilina	2QR	(Switzerland) Basel	1–1	0–3	1–4
2003–04	Žilina	2QR	(Israel) Maccabi Tel Aviv	1–0	1–1	2–1
2003–04	Žilina	3QR	(England) Chelsea	0–2	0–3	0–5
2004–05	Žilina	2QR	(Romania) Dinamo București	0–1	0–1	0–2
2005–06	Petržalka	1QR	(Kazakhstan) Kairat Almaty	4–1	0–2	4–3 (e.t)
2005–06	Petržalka	2QR	(Scotland) Celtic	5–0	0–4	5–4
2005–06	Petržalka	3QR	(Serbia) Partizan	0–0	0–0	0–0 (4–3 p)
2005–06	Petržalka	G-H	(Italy) Internazionale	0–1	0–4	3rd
2005–06	Petržalka	G-H	(Scotland) Rangers	2–2	0–0	3rd
2005–06	Petržalka	G-H	(Portugal) Porto	0–0	3–2	3rd
2006–07	Ružomberok	2QR	(Sweden) Djurgården	3–1	0–1	3–2
2006–07	Ružomberok	3QR	(Russia) CSKA Moscow	0–2	0–3	0–5
2007–08	Žilina	1QR	(Luxembourg) Dudelange	5–4	2–1	7–5
2007–08	Žilina	2QR	(Czech Republic) Slavia Prague	0–0	0–0	0–0 (3–4 p)
2008–09	Petržalka	1QR	(Malta) Valletta	1–0	2–0	3–0
2008–09	Petržalka	2QR	(Finland) Tampere United	4–2	3–1	7–3
2008–09	Petržalka	3QR	(Italy) Juventus	1–1	0–4	1–5
2009–10	Slovan Bratislava	2QR	(Bosnia and Herzegovina) Zrinjski Mostar	4–0	0–1	4–1
2009–10	Slovan Bratislava	3QR	(Greece) Olympiacos	0–2	0–2	0–4
2010–11	Žilina	2QR	(Malta) Birkirkara	3–0	0–1	3–1
2010–11	Žilina	3QR	(Bulgaria) Litex Lovech	3–1	1–1	4–2
2010–11	Žilina	PO	(Czech Republic) Sparta Prague	1–0	2–0	3–0
2010–11	Žilina	G-F	(England) Chelsea	1–4	1–2	4th
2010–11	Žilina	G-F	(France) Marseille	0–7	0–1	4th
2010–11	Žilina	G-F	(Russia) Spartak Moscow	1–2	0–3	4th
2011–12	Slovan Bratislava	2QR	(Kazakhstan) Tobol Kostanay	2–0	1–1	3–1
2011–12	Slovan Bratislava	3QR	(Cyprus) APOEL	0–2	0–0	0–2
2012–13	Žilina	2QR	(Israel) Ironi Kiryat Shmona	1–0	0–2	1–2
2013–14	Slovan Bratislava	2QR	(Bulgaria) Ludogorets Razgrad	2–1	0–3	2–4
2014–15	Slovan Bratislava	2QR	(Wales) The New Saints	1–0	2–0	3–0
2014–15	Slovan Bratislava	3QR	(Moldova) Sheriff Tiraspol	2–1	0–0	2–1
2014–15	Slovan Bratislava	PO	(Belarus) BATE Borisov	1–1	0–3	1–4
2015–16	Trenčín	2QR	(Romania) Steaua București	0–2	3–2	3–4
2016–17	Trenčín	2QR	(Slovenia) Olimpija Ljubljana	2–3	4–3	6–6 (a)
2016–17	Trenčín	3QR	(Poland) Legia Warsaw	0–1	0–0	0–1
2017–18	Žilina	2QR	(Denmark) Copenhagen	1–3	2–1	3–4
2018–19	Spartak Trnava	1QR	(Bosnia and Herzegovina) Zrinjski Mostar	1–0	1–1	2–1
2018–19	Spartak Trnava	2QR	(Poland) Legia Warsaw	0–1	2–0	2–1
2018–19	Spartak Trnava	3QR	(Serbia) Red Star Belgrade	1–2	1–1	2–3 (a.e.t.)
2019–20	Slovan Bratislava	1QR	(Montenegro) Sutjeska Nikšić	1–1	1–1	2–2 (2–3 p)
2020–21	Slovan Bratislava	1QR	(Faroe Islands) KÍ	—N/a	0–3	0–3 (awd.)
2021–22	Slovan Bratislava	1QR	(Republic of Ireland) Shamrock Rovers	2–0	1–2	3–2
2021–22	Slovan Bratislava	2QR	(Switzerland) Young Boys	0–0	2–3	2–3
2022–23	Slovan Bratislava	1QR	(Georgia (country)) Dinamo Batumi	0–0	0–0	2–1 (a.e.t)
2022–23	Slovan Bratislava	2QR	(Hungary) Ferencváros	1–4	2–1	3–5
2023–24	Slovan Bratislava	1QR	(Luxembourg) Swift Hesperange	1–1	2–0	3–1
2023–24	Slovan Bratislava	2QR	(Bosnia and Herzegovina) Zrinjski Mostar	2–2	1–0	3–2
2023–24	Slovan Bratislava	3QR	(Israel) Maccabi Haifa	1–2	1–3	2–5
2024–25	Slovan Bratislava	1QR	(North Macedonia) Struga	4–2	2–1	6–3
2024–25	Slovan Bratislava	2QR	(Slovenia) Celje	5–0	1–1	6–1
2024–25	Slovan Bratislava	3QR	(Cyprus) APOEL	2–0	0–0	2–0
2024–25	Slovan Bratislava	PO	(Denmark) Midtjylland	3–2	1–1	4–3
2024–25	Slovan Bratislava	LS	(Scotland) Celtic	—N/a	1–5	35th
2024–25	Slovan Bratislava	LS	(England) Manchester City	0–4	—N/a	35th
2024–25	Slovan Bratislava	LS	(Spain) Girona	—N/a	0–2	35th
2024–25	Slovan Bratislava	LS	(Croatia) Dinamo Zagreb	1–4	—N/a	35th
2024–25	Slovan Bratislava	LS	(Italy) AC Milan	2–3	—N/a	35th
2024–25	Slovan Bratislava	LS	(Spain) Atlético Madrid	—N/a	1–3	35th
2024–25	Slovan Bratislava	LS	(Germany) VfB Stuttgart	1–3	—N/a	35th
2024–25	Slovan Bratislava	LS	(Germany) Bayern Munich	—N/a	1–3	35th
2025–26	Slovan Bratislava	2QR	(Bosnia and Herzegovina) Zrinjski Mostar	4–0	2–2	6–2
2025–26	Slovan Bratislava	3QR	(Kazakhstan) Kairat	1–0	0–1	1–1 (3–4 p)
2026–27	Slovan Bratislava	2QR	(Georgia (country)) Iberia 1999	1–1	2–0	3–1
2026–27	Slovan Bratislava	3QR	(Sweden) Mjällby AIF	2–0	2–1	4–1
2026–27	Slovan Bratislava	PO	(Slovenia) Celje	1–1	2–1	3–2 (e.t)
2026–27	Slovan Bratislava	LS	(France) Paris Saint-Germain	—N/a	1–6	TBD
2026–27	Slovan Bratislava	LS	(Germany) VfB Stuttgart	–	—N/a	TBD
2026–27	Slovan Bratislava	LS	(Italy) AS Roma	—N/a	–	TBD
2026–27	Slovan Bratislava	LS	(Austria) LASK	—N/a	–	TBD
2026–27	Slovan Bratislava	LS	(Spain) Real Betis	–	—N/a	TBD
2026–27	Slovan Bratislava	LS	(Ukraine) Shakhtar Donetsk	–	—N/a	TBD
2026–27	Slovan Bratislava	LS	(France) Lille	—N/a	–	TBD
2026–27	Slovan Bratislava	LS	(Italy) Inter Milan	–	—N/a	TBD

=== Inter-Cities Fairs Cup/UEFA Cup/Europa League ===
Season	Club	Round	Opponent	Home	Away	Agg
Inter-Cities Fairs Cup
1961–62	None					
1962–63	None					
1963–64	None					
1964–65	None					
1965–66	None					
1966–67	None					
1967–68	None					
1968–69	None					
1969–70	None					
1970–71	Spartak Trnava	1R	(France) Marseille	2–0	0–2	2–2 (p)
1970–71	Spartak Trnava	2R	(Germany) Hertha BSC	3–1	0–1	3–2
1970–71	Spartak Trnava	3R	(Germany) Köln	0–1	0–3	0–4
UEFA Cup
1971–72	Košice	1R	(Soviet Union) Spartak Moscow	2–1	0–2	2–3
1972–73	Slovan Bratislava	1R	(Socialist Federal Republic of Yugoslavia) Vojvodina	6–0	2–1	8–1
1972–73	Slovan Bratislava	2R	(Spain) Las Palmas	0–1	2–2	2–3
1973–74	Tatran Prešov	1R	(Socialist Federal Republic of Yugoslavia) Velež Mostar	4–2	1–1	5–3
1973–74	Tatran Prešov	2R	(Germany) VfB Stuttgart	3–1	1–3	4–8 (e.t.)
1973–74	Košice	1R	(Hungary) Honvéd	1–0	2–5	3–5
1974–75	None					
1975–76	Inter Bratislava	1R	(Spain) Real Zaragoza	5–0	3–2	8–2
1975–76	Inter Bratislava	2R	(Greece) AEK Athens	2–0	1–3	3–3 (a)
1975–76	Inter Bratislava	3R	(Poland) Stal Mielec	1–0	0–2	1–2
1976–77	Slovan Bratislava	1R	(Iceland) Fram	5–0	3–0	8–0
1976–77	Slovan Bratislava	2R	(England) QPR	3–3	2–5	5–8
1977–78	Inter Bratislava	1R	(Austria) Rapid Wien	3–0	0–1	3–1
1977–78	Inter Bratislava	2R	(Switzerland) Grasshopper	1–0	1–5	2–5
1978–79	Lokomotíva Košice	1R	(Italy) Milan	1–0	0–1	1–1 (6–7 p)
1979–80	None					
1980–81	None					
1981–82	None					
1982–83	None					
1983–84	Inter Bratislava	1R	(Malta) Rabat Ajax	6–0	10–0	16–0
1983–84	Inter Bratislava	2R	(Socialist Federal Republic of Yugoslavia) Radnički Niš	3–2	0–4	3–6
1984–85	Dukla Banská Bystrica	1R	(Germany) B. Mönchengladbach	2–3	1–4	3–7
1985–86	None					
1986–87	None					
1987–88	None					
1988–89	DAC Dunajská Streda	1R	(Sweden) Östers IF	6–0	0–2	6–2
1988–89	DAC Dunajská Streda	2R	(Germany) Bayern Munich	0–2	1–3	1–5
1989–90	Nitra	1R	(Germany) Köln	0–1	1–4	1–5
1990–91	Inter Bratislava	1R	(Luxembourg) Avenir Beggen	5–0	1–2	6–2
1990–91	Inter Bratislava	2R	(Germany) Köln	0–2	1–0	1–2
1991–92	Slovan Bratislava	1R	(Spain) Real Madrid	1–2	1–1	2–3
1992–93	None					
1993–94	DAC Dunajská Streda	1R	Austria Salzburg	0–2	0–2	0–4
1993–94	Slovan Bratislava	1R	(England) Aston Villa	0–0	1–2	1–2
1994–95	Inter Bratislava	PR	(Finland) MyPa	0–3	1–0	1–3
1994–95	Slovan Bratislava	PR	(Northern Ireland) Portadown	3–0	2–0	5–0
1994–95	Slovan Bratislava	1R	(Denmark) F.C. Copenhagen	1–0	1–1	2–1
1994–95	Slovan Bratislava	2R	(Germany) Borussia Dortmund	2–1	0–3	2–4
1995–96	Košice	PR	(Hungary) Újpest	0–1	1–2	1–3
1995–96	Slovan Bratislava	PR	(Croatia) Osijek	4–0	2–0	6–0
1995–96	Slovan Bratislava	1R	(Germany) Kaiserslautern	2–1	0–3	2–4
1996–97	Košice	PR	(Albania) Teuta Durrës	2–1	4–1	6–2
1996–97	Košice	QR	(Scotland) Celtic	0–0	0–1	0–1
1996–97	Slovan Bratislava	PR	(Republic of Ireland) St. Patrick's Athletic	1–0	4–3	5–3
1996–97	Slovan Bratislava	QR	(Turkey) Trabzonspor	2–1	1–4	3–5
1997–98	Spartak Trnava	1QR	(Malta) Birkirkara	3–1	1–0	4–1
1997–98	Spartak Trnava	2QR	(Greece) PAOK	0–1	3–5	3–6
1998–99	Inter Bratislava	1QR	(Albania) SK Tirana	2–0	2–0	4–0
1998–99	Inter Bratislava	2QR	(Czech Republic) Slavia Prague	2–0	0–4	2–4
1998–99	Košice	1R	(England) Liverpool	0–3	0–5	0–8
1999–00	Dukla Banská Bystrica	1R	(Netherlands) Ajax Amsterdam	1–3	1–6	2–9
1999–00	Spartak Trnava	QR	(Albania) Vllaznia Shkodër	2–0	1–1	3–1
1999–00	Spartak Trnava	1R	(Austria) Grazer AK	2–1	0–3	2–4
1999–00	Inter Bratislava	QR	(Albania) Bylis	3–1	2–0	5–1
1999–00	Inter Bratislava	1R	(Austria) Rapid Wien	1–0	2–1	3–1
1999–00	Inter Bratislava	2R	(France) Nantes	0–3	0–4	0–7
2000–01	Košice	QR	(Armenia) Ararat Yerevan	1–1	3–2	4–3
2000–01	Košice	1R	Grazer AK	2–3	0–0	2–3
2000–01	Slovan Bratislava	QR	Locomotive Tbilisi	2–0	2–0	4–0
2000–01	Slovan Bratislava	1R	Dinamo Zagreb	0–3	1–1	1–3
2000–01	Inter Bratislava	1R	Roda JC	2–1	2–0	4–1
2000–01	Inter Bratislava	2R	Lokomotiv Moscow	1–2	0–1	1–3
2001–02	Inter Bratislava	1R	Litex Lovech	1–0	0–3	1–3
2001–02	Slovan Bratislava	QR	Cwmbran Town	1–0	4–0	5–0
2001–02	Slovan Bratislava	1R	Slovan Liberec	1–0	0–2	1–2
2001–02	Púchov	QR	Sliema Wanderers	3–0	1–2	4–2
2001–02	Púchov	1R	Freiburg	0–0	1–2	1–2
2001–02	Ružomberok	QR	Belshina Bobruisk	3–1	0–0	3–1
2001–02	Ružomberok	1R	Troyes	1–0	1–6	2–6
2002–03	Senec	QR	Široki Brijeg	1–2	0–3	1–5
2002–03	Púchov	QR	Atyrau	2–0	0–0	2–0
2002–03	Púchov	1R	Bordeaux	1–4	0–6	1–10
2003–04	Žilina	1R	Utrecht	0–4	0–2	0–6
2003–04	Petržalka	QR	F91 Dudelange	1–0	1–0	2–0
2003–04	Petržalka	1R	Bordeaux	1–1	1–2	2–3
2003–04	Púchov	QR	Sioni Bolnisi	3–0	3–0	6–0
2003–04	Púchov	1R	Barcelona	1–1	0–8	1–9
2004–05	Petržalka	2QR	Dnipro Dnipropetrovsk	0–3	1–1	1–4
2004–05	Dukla Banská Bystrica	1QR	Karabakh	3–0	1–0	4–0
2004–05	Dukla Banská Bystrica	2QR	Wil	3–1	1–1	4–2
2004–05	Dukla Banská Bystrica	1R	Benfica	0–3	0–2	0–5
2005–06	Dukla Banská Bystrica	2QR	Dyskobolia Grodzisk	0–0	1–4	1–4
2005–06	Žilina	1QR	Baku	3–1	0–1	3–2
2005–06	Žilina	2QR	Austria Wien	1–2	2–2	3–4
2005–06	Petržalka	R32	Levski Sofia	0–1	0–2	0–3
2006–07	Spartak Trnava	1QR	Karvan	0–1	0–1	0–2
2006–07	Ružomberok	1R	Club Brugge	0–1	1–1	1–2
2006–07	Petržalka	1QR	WIT Georgia	2–0	1–2	3–2
2006–07	Petržalka	2QR	Dinamo Minsk	2–1	3–2	5–3
2006–07	Petržalka	1R	Espanyol	2–2	1–3	3–5
2007–08	Zlaté Moravce	1QR	Alma-Ata	3–1	1–1	4–2
2007–08	Zlaté Moravce	2QR	Zenit St. Petersburg	0–2	0–3	0–5
2007–08	Petržalka	1QR	Zimbru Chişinău	1–1	2–2	3–3 (a)
2007–08	Petržalka	2QR	MIKA	2–0	1–2	3–2
2007–08	Petržalka	1R	Panathinaikos	1–2	0–3	1–5
2008–09	Spartak Trnava	1QR	WIT Georgia	2–2	0–1	2–3
2008–09	Petržalka	1R	Braga	0–2	0–4	0–6
2008–09	Žilina	1QR	MTZ-RIPO Minsk	1–0	2–2	3–2
2008–09	Žilina	2QR	Slovan Liberec	2–1	2–1	4–2
2008–09	Žilina	1R	Levski Sofia	1–1	1–0	2–1
2008–09	Žilina	G-F	Hamburger SV	1–2	—N/a	4th
2008–09	Žilina	G-F	AFC Ajax	—N/a	0–1	4th
2008–09	Žilina	G-F	Slavia Prague	0–0	—N/a	4th
2008–09	Žilina	G-F	Aston Villa	—N/a	2–1	4th
UEFA Europa League
2009–10	Spartak Trnava	1QR	Inter Baku	2–1	3–1	5–2
2009–10	Spartak Trnava	2QR	Sarajevo	1–1	0–1	1–2
2009–10	Slovan Bratislava	PO	Ajax	1–2	0–5	1–7
2009–10	Košice	3QR	Slavija Sarajevo	3–1	2–0	5–1
2009–10	Košice	PO	Roma	3–3	1–7	4–10
2009–10	Žilina	2QR	Dacia Chişinău	2–0	1–0	3–0
2009–10	Žilina	3QR	Hajduk Split	1–1	1–0	2–1
2009–10	Žilina	PO	Partizan	0–2	1–1	1–3
2010–11	Nitra	1QR	Győri ETO	2–2	1–3	3–5
2010–11	Dukla Banská Bystrica	2QR	Zestaponi	1–0	0–3	1–3
2010–11	Slovan Bratislava	3QR	Red Star Belgrade	1–1	2–1	3–2
2010–11	Slovan Bratislava	PO	VfB Stuttgart	0–1	2–2	2–3
2011–12	Žilina	2QR	KR	2–0	0–3	2–3
2011–12	Senica	3QR	Red Bull Salzburg	0–3	0–1	0–4
2011–12	Spartak Trnava	1QR	Zeta	3–0	1–2	4–2
2011–12	Spartak Trnava	2QR	Tirana	3–1	0–0	3–1
2011–12	Spartak Trnava	3QR	Levski Sofia	2–1	1–2	3–3 (5–4p)
2011–12	Spartak Trnava	PO	Lokomotiv Moscow	1–1	0–2	1–3
2011–12	Slovan Bratislava	PO	Roma	1–0	1–1	2–1
2011–12	Slovan Bratislava	G-F	Athletic Bilbao	1–2	1–2	4th
2011–12	Slovan Bratislava	G-F	Red Bull Salzburg	2–3	0–3	4th
2011–12	Slovan Bratislava	G-F	Paris Saint-Germain	0–0	0–1	4th
2012–13	Slovan Bratislava	2QR	Videoton	1–1	0–0	1–1 (a)
2012–13	Senica	1QR	MTK Budapest	2–1	2–2	4–3
2012–13	Senica	2QR	APOEL	0–1	0–2	0–3
2012–13	Spartak Trnava	2QR	Sligo Rovers	3–1	1–1	4–2
2012–13	Spartak Trnava	3QR	Steaua București	0–3	1–0	1–3
2013–14	Senica	2QR	Mladost Podgorica	0–1	2–2	2–3
2013–14	Trenčín	2QR	IFK Göteborg	2–1	0–0	2–1
2013–14	Trenčín	3QR	Astra Giurgiu	1–3	2–2	3–5
2013–14	Žilina	1QR	Torpedo Kutaisi	3–3	3–0	6–3
2013–14	Žilina	2QR	Olimpija Ljubljana	2–0	1–3	3–3 (a)
2013–14	Žilina	3QR	Rijeka	1–1	1–2	2–3
2014–15	Košice	2QR	Slovan Liberec	0–1	0–3	0–4
2014–15	Trenčín	2QR	Vojvodina	4–0	0–3	4–3
2014–15	Trenčín	3QR	Hull City	0–0	1–2	1–2
2014–15	Spartak Trnava	1QR	Hibernians	5–0	4–2	9–2
2014–15	Spartak Trnava	2QR	Zestaponi	3–0	0–0	3–0
2014–15	Spartak Trnava	3QR	St Johnstone	1–1	2–1	3–2
2014–15	Spartak Trnava	PO	Zürich	1–3	1–1	2–4
2014–15	Slovan Bratislava	G-I	Napoli	0–2	0–3	4th
2014–15	Slovan Bratislava	G-I	Sparta Prague	0–3	0–4	4th
2014–15	Slovan Bratislava	G-I	Young Boys	1–3	0–5	4th
2015–16	Spartak Trnava	1QR	Olimpic	0–0	1–1	1–1
2015–16	Spartak Trnava	2QR	Linfield	2–1	3–1	5–2
2015–16	Spartak Trnava	3QR	PAOK	1–1	0–1	1–2
2015–16	Slovan Bratislava	1QR	College Europa	3–0	6–0	9–0
2015–16	Slovan Bratislava	2QR	UCD	1–0	5–1	6–1
2015–16	Slovan Bratislava	3QR	Krasnodar	3–3	0–2	3–5
2015–16	Žilina	1QR	Glentoran	3–0	4–1	7–1
2015–16	Žilina	2QR	Dacia	4–2	2–1	6–3
2015–16	Žilina	3QR	Vorskla Poltava	2–0	0–2	3–3 (e.t., a)
2015–16	Žilina	PO	Athletic Bilbao	3–2	0–1	3–3 (a)
2016–17	Spartak Myjava	1QR	Admira Wacker	2–3	1–1	3–4
2016–17	Slovan Bratislava	1QR	FK Partizani	Canc.	0–0	w/o
2016–17	Slovan Bratislava	2QR	FK Jelgava	0–0	0–3	0–3
2016–17	Spartak Trnava	1QR	Hibernians	3–0	3–0	6–0
2016–17	Spartak Trnava	2QR	Shirak	2–0	1–1	3–1
2016–17	Spartak Trnava	3QR	Austria Wien	0–1	1–0	1–1 (4–5p)
2016–17	Trenčín	PO	Rapid Wien	0–4	2–0	2–4
2017–18	Trenčín	1QR	Torpedo Kutaisi	5–1	3–0	8–1
2017–18	Trenčín	2QR	Bnei Yehuda	1–1	0–2	1–3
2017–18	Slovan Bratislava	1QR	Pyunik	5–0	4–1	9–1
2017–18	Slovan Bratislava	2QR	Lyngby	0–1	1–2	1–3
2017–18	Ružomberok	1QR	Vojvodina	2–0	1–2	3–2
2017–18	Ružomberok	2QR	Brann	0–1	2–0	2–1
2017–18	Ružomberok	3QR	Everton	0–1	0–1	0–2
2018–19	DAC Dunajská Streda	1QR	Dinamo Tbilisi	1–1	2–1	3–2
2018–19	DAC Dunajská Streda	2QR	Dinamo Minsk	1–3	1–4	2–7
2018–19	Slovan Bratislava	1QR	Milsami Orhei	5–0	4–2	9–2
2018–19	Slovan Bratislava	2QR	Balzan	3–1	1–2	4–3
2018–19	Slovan Bratislava	3QR	Rapid Wien	2–1	0–4	2–5
2018–19	Trenčín	1QR	Budućnost Podgorica	1–1	2–0	3–1
2018–19	Trenčín	2QR	Górnik Zabrze	4–1	1–0	5–1
2018–19	Trenčín	3QR	Feyenoord	4–0	1–1	5–1
2018–19	Trenčín	PO	Larnaca	1–1	0–3	1–4
2018–19	Spartak Trnava	PO	Olimpija Ljubljana	1–1	2–0	3–1
2018–19	Spartak Trnava	G-D	Anderlecht	1–0	0–0	3rd
2018–19	Spartak Trnava	G-D	Dinamo Zagreb	1–2	1–3	3rd
2018–19	Spartak Trnava	G-D	Fenerbahçe	1–0	0–2	3rd
2019–20	Ružomberok	1QR	Levski Sofia	0–2	0–2	0–4
2019–20	DAC Dunajská Streda	1QR	Cracovia	1–1	1–1	3–3 (e.t., a)
2019–20	DAC Dunajská Streda	2QR	Atromitos	1–2	2–3	3–5
2019–20	Spartak Trnava	1QR	Radnik Bijeljina	2–0	0–2	2–2 (3–2 p)
2019–20	Spartak Trnava	2QR	Lokomotiv Plovdiv	3–1	0–2	3–3 (a)
2019–20	Slovan Bratislava	2QR	Feronikeli	2–1	2–0	4–1
2019–20	Slovan Bratislava	3QR	Dundalk	1–0	3–1	4–1
2019–20	Slovan Bratislava	PO	PAOK	1–0	2–3	3–3 (a)
2019–20	Slovan Bratislava	G-K	Beşiktaş	4–2	1–2	3rd
2019–20	Slovan Bratislava	G-K	Braga	2–4	2–2	3rd
2019–20	Slovan Bratislava	G-K	Wolverhampton	1–2	0–1	3rd
2020–21	Ružomberok	1QR	Servette	—N/a	0–3	0–3
2020–21	Žilina	1QR	The New Saints	—N/a	1–1	1–3 (e.t.)
2020–21	Slovan Bratislava	2QR	KuPS	—N/a	1–1	1–1 (3–4 p)
2020–21	DAC Dunajská Streda	1QR	FH	—N/a	2–0	2–0
2020–21	DAC Dunajská Streda	2QR	Jablonec	3–3	—N/a	5–3 (e.t.)
2020–21	DAC Dunajská Streda	3QR	LASK	—N/a	0–7	0–7
2021–22	Slovan Bratislava	3QR	Lincoln Red Imps	1–1	3–1	4–2
2021–22	Slovan Bratislava	PO	Olympiacos	2–2	0–3	2–5
2022–23	Slovan Bratislava	3QR	Olympiacos	1–1	1–1	3–3 (3–4 p)
2023–24	Slovan Bratislava	PO	Aris	2–1	2–6	4–7
2024–25	Ružomberok	1QR	Tobol	5–2	0–1	5–3
2024–25	Ružomberok	2QR	Trabzonspor	0–2	0–1	0–3
2025–26	Spartak Trnava	1QR	Häcken	0–1	2–2	2–3
2025–26	Slovan Bratislava	PO	Young Boys	0–1	2–3	2–4
2026–27	Žilina	1QR	Hajduk Split	2–1	0–2	2–3

=== Europa Conference League/Conference League ===
Season	Club	Round	Opponent	Home	Away	Agg
UEFA Europa Conference League
2021–22	DAC Dunajská Streda	2QR	(Serbia) Partizan	0–2	0–1	0–3
2021–22	Spartak Trnava	1QR	(Malta) Mosta	2–0	2–3	4–3
2021–22	Spartak Trnava	2QR	(Romania) Sepsi OSK	0–0	1–1	1–1 (4–3 p)
2021–22	Spartak Trnava	3QR	(Israel) Maccabi Tel Aviv	0–0	0–1	0–1
2021–22	Žilina	1QR	(Georgia (country)) Dila Gori	5–1	1–2	6–3
2021–22	Žilina	2QR	(Cyprus) Apollon Limassol	2–2	3–1	5–3
2021–22	Žilina	3QR	(Kazakhstan) Tobol	5–0	1–0	6–0
2021–22	Žilina	PO	(Czech Republic) Jablonec	0–3	1–5	1–8
2021–22	Slovan Bratislava	G-F	(Denmark) Copenhagen	1–3	0–2	3rd
2021–22	Slovan Bratislava	G-F	(Greece) PAOK	0–0	1–1	3rd
2021–22	Slovan Bratislava	G-F	(Gibraltar) Lincoln Red Imps	2–0	4–1	3rd
2022–23	Ružomberok	1QR	(Lithuania) Kauno Žalgiris	2–0	0–0	2–0
2022–23	Ružomberok	2QR	(Latvia) Riga	0–3	1–2	1–5
2022–23	DAC Dunajská Streda	1QR	(Northern Ireland) Cliftonville	2–1	3–0	5–1
2022–23	DAC Dunajská Streda	2QR	(Faroe Islands) Víkingur	2–0	2–0	4–0
2022–23	DAC Dunajská Streda	3QR	(Romania) FCSB	0–1	0–1	0–2
2022–23	Spartak Trnava	2QR	(Wales) Newtown	4–1	2–1	6–2
2022–23	Spartak Trnava	3QR	(Poland) Raków Częstochowa	0–2	0–1	0–3
2022–23	Slovan Bratislava	PO	(Bosnia and Herzegovina) Zrinjski Mostar	1–0	0–1	2–2 (6–5 p)
2022–23	Slovan Bratislava	G-H	(Switzerland) Basel	3–3	2–0	1st
2022–23	Slovan Bratislava	G-H	(Lithuania) Žalgiris	0–0	2–1	1st
2022–23	Slovan Bratislava	G-H	(Armenia) Pyunik	2–1	0–2	1st
2022–23	Slovan Bratislava	R16	(Switzerland) Basel	2–2	2–2	4–4 (1–4 p)
2023–24	DAC Dunajská Streda	1QR	(Georgia (country)) Dila Gori	2–1	0–2	2–3
2023–24	Žilina	1QR	(Estonia) Levadia Tallinn	2–1	2–1	4–2
2023–24	Žilina	2QR	(Belgium) Gent	2–5	1–5	3–10
2023–24	Spartak Trnava	2QR	(Latvia) Auda	4–1	1–1	5–2
2023–24	Spartak Trnava	3QR	(Poland) Lech Poznań	3–1	1–2	4–3
2023–24	Spartak Trnava	PO	(Ukraine) Dnipro-1	1–1	1–1	3–2 (a.e.t)
2023–24	Spartak Trnava	G-H	(Turkey) Fenerbahçe	1–2	0–4	4th
2023–24	Spartak Trnava	G-H	(Bulgaria) Ludogorets	1–2	0–4	4th
2023–24	Spartak Trnava	G-H	(Denmark) Nordsjælland	0–2	1–1	4th
2023–24	Slovan Bratislava	G-A	(France) Lille	1–1	1–2	2nd
2023–24	Slovan Bratislava	G-A	(Slovenia) Olimpija Ljubljana	1–2	1–0	2nd
2023–24	Slovan Bratislava	G-A	(Faroe Islands) KÍ	2–1	2–1	2nd
2023–24	Slovan Bratislava	R32	(Austria) Sturm Graz	0–1	1–4	1–5
UEFA Conference League
2024–25	DAC Dunajská Streda	2QR	(Azerbaijan) Zira	1–2	0–4	1–6
2024–25	Spartak Trnava	2QR	(Bosnia and Herzegovina) Sarajevo	3–0	0–0	3–0
2024–25	Spartak Trnava	3QR	(Poland) Wisła Kraków	3–1	0–2	4–4 (11–12 p)
2024–25	Ružomberok	3QR	(Croatia) Hajduk Split	0–0	1–0	1–0
2024–25	Ružomberok	PO	(Armenia) Noah	3–1	0–3	3–4
2025–26	Žilina	2QR	(Poland) Raków Częstochowa	1–3	0–3	1–6
2025–26	Spartak Trnava	2QR	(Malta) Hibernians	5–1	2–1	7–2
2025–26	Spartak Trnava	3QR	(Romania) Universitatea Craiova	4–1	0–3	4–6 (a.e.t)
2025–26	~~DAC Dunajská Streda~~; FC Košice	2QR	(Belarus) Neman Grodno	2–3	1–1	3–4
2025–26	Slovan Bratislava	LS	(France) Strasbourg	1–2	—N/a	29th
2025–26	Slovan Bratislava	LS	(Netherlands) AZ	—N/a	0–1	29th
2025–26	Slovan Bratislava	LS	(Finland) KuPS	—N/a	1–3	29th
2025–26	Slovan Bratislava	LS	(Spain) Rayo Vallecano	2–1	—N/a	29th
2025–26	Slovan Bratislava	LS	(North Macedonia) Shkëndija	—N/a	0–2	29th
2025–26	Slovan Bratislava	LS	(Sweden) Häcken	1–0	—N/a	29th
2026–27	Spartak Trnava	2QR	(Bulgaria) CSKA 1948 Sofia	0–0	0–0	0–0 (3–5 p)
2026–27	DAC Dunajská Streda	2QR	(Bosnia and Herzegovina) Velež Mostar	1–0	3–0	4–0
2026–27	DAC Dunajská Streda	3QR	(Netherlands) Twente	3–3	0–6	3–9
2026–27	Žilina	2QR	(Poland) GKS Katowice	2-1	1–3	3–4

PR = Preliminary round; QR = Qualifying round; 1R/2R = First/Second round; 1QR/2QR/3QR = First/Second/Third qualifying round

Notes

1. The first qualifying round match between KÍ and Slovan Bratislava, originally scheduled to be played on 19 August 2020, was postponed to 21 August 2020 due to one player and one staff member from Slovan Bratislava testing positive for SARS-2 coronavirus and the whole team being put into quarantine by the Faroese authorities. On 21 August, the match could not be played due to another player from Slovan Bratislava testing positive for SARS-2 coronavirus and the whole second team being put into quarantine by the Faroese authorities. KÍ were subsequently awarded a technical 3–0 victory by UEFA according to the regulations related to COVID-19.
2. Partizani Tirana replaced Skënderbeu Korçë in the 2016–17 UEFA Champions League second qualifying round and Slovan Bratislava proceeded directly to the UEFA Europa League second qualifying round, after Skënderbeu Korçë was excluded by UEFA for match-fixing.
3. DAC Dunajská Streda were excluded from the Conference League due to the club having the same ownership as Hungarian side Győri ETO FC, who had also qualified for the competition. They were replaced by FC Košice.

== Defunct competitions ==
=== Cup Winners' Cup ===
Season	Club	Round	Opponent	Home	Away	Agg
European Cup Winners' Cup
1961–62	Žilina	1R	Olympiacos	1–0	3–2	4–2
1961–62	Žilina	QF	Fiorentina	3–2	0–2	3–4
1962–63	Slovan Bratislava	1R	Lausanne-Sport	1–0	1–1	2–1
1962–63	Slovan Bratislava	QF	Tottenham Hotspur	2–0	0–6	2–6
1963–64	Slovan Bratislava	1R	HPS Helsinki	8–1	4–1	12–1
1963–64	Slovan Bratislava	2R	Borough United	3–0	1–0	4–0
1963–64	Slovan Bratislava	QF	Celtic	0–1	0–1	0–2
1964–65	None					
1965–66	None					
1966–67	Tatran Prešov	1R	Bayern Munich	1–1	2–3	3–4
1967–68	Spartak Trnava	1R	Lausanne-Sport	2–0	2–3	4–3
1967–68	Spartak Trnava	2R	Torpedo Moscow	1–3	0–3	1–6
1968–69	Slovan Bratislava	1R	Bor	3–0	0–2	3–2
1968–69	Slovan Bratislava	2R	Porto	4–0	0–1	4–1
1968–69	Slovan Bratislava	QF	Torino	2–1	1–0	3–1
1968–69	Slovan Bratislava	SF	Dunfermline Athletic	1–1	1–0	2–1
1968–69	Slovan Bratislava	F	Barcelona	—N/a	—N/a	3–2
1969–70	Slovan Bratislava	1R	Dinamo Zagreb	0–0	0–3	0–3
1970–71	None					
1971–72	None					
1972–73	None					
1973–74	None					
1974–75	None					
1975–76	Spartak Trnava	1R	Boavista	0–0	0–3	0–3
1976–77	None					
1977–78	Lokomotíva Košice	1R	Öster	0–0	2–2	2–2 (a)
1977–78	Lokomotíva Košice	2R	Austria Wien	1–1	0–0	1–1 (a)
1978–79	None					
1979–80	Lokomotíva Košice	1R	Wacker Innsbruck	1–0	2–1	3–1
1979–80	Lokomotíva Košice	2R	Rijeka	2–0	0–3	2–3
1980–81	None					
1981–82	None					
1982–83	Slovan Bratislava	1R	Internazionale	2–1	0–2	2–3
1983–84	None					
1984–85	Inter Bratislava	1R	Kuusysi Lahti	2–1	0–0	2–1
1984–85	Inter Bratislava	2R	Everton	0–1	0–3	0–4
1985–86	None					
1986–87	Spartak Trnava	1R	VfB Stuttgart	0–0	0–1	0–1
1987–88	DAC Dunajská Streda	PR	AEL Limassol	5–1	1–0	6–1
1987–88	DAC Dunajská Streda	1R	Young Boys	2–1	1–3	3–4
1988–89	Inter Bratislava	1R	CSKA Sofia	2–3	0–5	2–8
1989–90	Slovan Bratislava	1R	Grasshopper	3–0	0–4	3–4 (e.t.)
1990–91	None					
1991–92	None					
1992–93	None					
1993–94	Košice	QR	Žalgiris Vilnius	2–1	1–0	3–1
1993–94	Košice	1R	Beşiktaş	2–1	0–2	2–3
UEFA Cup Winners' Cup
1994–95	Tatran Prešov	QR	Bangor	4–0	1–0	5–0
1994–95	Tatran Prešov	1R	Dundee United	3–1	2–3	5–4
1994–95	Tatran Prešov	2R	Real Zaragoza	0–4	1–2	1–6
1995–96	Inter Bratislava	QR	Valletta	5–2	0–0	5–2
1995–96	Inter Bratislava	1R	Real Zaragoza	0–2	1–3	1–5
1996–97	Humenné	QR	Flamurtari Vlorë	1–0	2–0	3–0
1996–97	Humenné	1R	AEK Athens	0–1	1–2	1–3
1997–98	Slovan Bratislava	QR	Levski Sofia	2–1	1–1	3–2
1997–98	Slovan Bratislava	1R	Chelsea	0–2	0–2	0–4
1998–99	Spartak Trnava	QR	Vardar	2–0	1–0	3–0
1998–99	Spartak Trnava	1R	Beşiktaş	2–1	0–3	2–4

PR = Preliminary round; QR = Qualifying round; 1R/2R = First/Second round; QF = Quarter-finals

=== UEFA Intertoto Cup ===
Season	Club	Round	Opponent	Home	Away	Agg
1995	Košice	G-10	Bursaspor	—N/a	1–1	—N/a
1995	Košice	G-10	Charleroi	3–2	—N/a	—N/a
1995	Košice	G-10	Wimbledon	1–1	—N/a	—N/a
1995	Košice	G-10	Beitar Jerusalem	—N/a	5–3	—N/a
1996	Spartak Trnava	G-9	Karlsruhe	1–1	—N/a	—N/a
1996	Spartak Trnava	G-9	Universitatea Craiova	—N/a	1–2	—N/a
1996	Spartak Trnava	G-9	Daugava	—N/a	6–0	—N/a
1996	Spartak Trnava	G-9	Čukarički Stankom	3–0	—N/a	—N/a
1997	Žilina	G-9	Lyon	0–5	—N/a	—N/a
1997	Žilina	G-9	Rapid Bucharest	—N/a	0–2	—N/a
1997	Žilina	G-9	Odra Wodzisław	0–0	—N/a	—N/a
1997	Žilina	G-9	Austria Wien	3–1	—N/a	—N/a
1998	Trenčín	1R	Dinaburg	4–1	1–1	5–2
1998	Trenčín	2R	Baltika Kaliningrad	0–1	0–0	0–1
1998	Rimavská Sobota	1R	Omagh Town	1–0	2–2	3–2
1998	Rimavská Sobota	2R	Sampdoria	1–0	0–2	1–2
1999	Trenčín	1R	Pobeda	3–1	1–3	4–4 p
1999	Žilina	1R	Herfølge	2–0	2–0	4–0
1999	Žilina	2R	Metz	2–1	0–3	2–4
2000	Trenčín	1R	Dinaburg	0–3	0–1	0–4
2001	Petržalka	1R	Ekranas	1–1	1–1	2–2 (4–3 p)
2001	Petržalka	2R	Celje	1–1	0–5	1–6
2002	Trenčín	1R	Slaven Belupo	3–1	0–5	3–6
2003	Spartak Trnava	1R	Pobeda	1–5	1–2	2–7
2003	Dubnica	1R	Olympiakos Nicosia	3–0	4–1	7–1
2003	Dubnica	2R	Koper	3–2	0–1	3–3 (a)
2004	Dubnica	1R	KS Teuta	4–0	0–0	4–0
2004	Dubnica	2R	Slovan Liberec	1–2	0–5	1–7
2004	Spartak Trnava	1R	Debreceni	3–0	1–4	4–4 (a)
2004	Spartak Trnava	2R	Sloboda Tuzla	2–1	1–0	3–1
2004	Spartak Trnava	3R	Slaven Belupo	2–2	0–0	2–2 (a)
2005	Dubnica	1R	Vasas	2–0	0–0	2–0
2005	Dubnica	2R	Osmanlıspor	0–1	4–0	4–1
2005	Dubnica	3R	Newcastle United	1–3	0–2	1–5
2006	Nitra	1R	Grevenmacher	6–2	6–0	12–2
2006	Nitra	2R	Dnipro Dnipropetrovsk	2–1	0–2	2–3
2007	Slovan Bratislava	1R	Differdange	3–0	2–0	5–0
2007	Slovan Bratislava	2R	Rapid Wien	1–0	1–3	2–3
2008	Nitra	1R	Neftchi Baku	3–1	0–2	3–3 (a)

GS = Group stage; 1R/2R = First/Second round

== Record by country of opposition ==
Updated 29 Aug 2024 9:00 CET

Country	Pld	W	D	L	GF	GA	GD	Win%
Albania	15	11	4	0	28	5	+23	73.33
Armenia	11	6	2	3	21	13	+8	54.55
Austria	34	11	5	18	33	59	−26	32.35
Azerbaijan	12	6	0	6	16	15	+1	50.00
Belarus	12	6	3	3	16	17	−1	50.00
Belgium	11	5	2	4	15	19	−4	45.45
Bosnia and Herzegovina	22	11	5	6	32	20	+12	50.00
Bulgaria	22	7	3	12	21	39	−18	31.82
Croatia	20	6	7	7	21	26	−5	30.00
Cyprus	19	8	5	6	30	25	+5	42.11
Czech Republic	20	6	4	10	17	37	−20	30.00
Denmark	18	7	4	7	21	24	−3	38.89
England	32	4	4	24	18	68	−50	12.50
Estonia	2	2	0	0	4	2	+2	100.00
Faroe Islands	5	4	0	1	8	5	+3	80.00
Finland	13	9	3	1	40	11	+29	69.23
France	21	3	3	15	13	53	−40	14.29
Georgia	24	13	6	5	45	20	+25	54.17
Germany	28	4	5	19	25	54	−29	14.29
Gibraltar	6	5	1	0	19	3	+16	83.33
Greece	28	6	7	15	30	48	−18	21.43
Hungary	20	6	8	6	27	29	−2	30.00
Iceland	7	6	0	1	16	3	+13	85.71
Republic of Ireland	10	8	1	1	22	9	+13	80.00
Israel	11	3	3	5	11	15	−4	27.27
Italy	24	7	3	14	19	46	−27	29.17
Kazakhstan	12	7	3	2	24	9	+15	58.33
Kosovo	2	2	0	0	4	1	+3	100.00
Latvia	11	3	3	5	17	16	+1	27.27
Lithuania	8	4	4	0	9	4	+5	50.00
Luxembourg	12	10	1	1	35	10	+25	83.33
Malta	22	16	2	4	64	15	+49	72.73
Moldova	10	7	3	0	23	9	+14	70.00
Montenegro	8	2	4	2	11	8	+3	25.00
Netherlands	15	4	1	10	14	31	−17	26.67
North Macedonia	8	5	0	3	15	14	+1	62.50
Northern Ireland	14	13	1	0	43	7	+36	92.86
Norway	6	3	1	2	8	9	−1	50.00
Poland	21	7	5	9	24	24	+0	33.33
Portugal	14	4	3	7	13	24	−11	28.57
Romania	19	3	6	10	16	26	−10	15.79
Russia	20	2	4	14	11	37	−26	10.00
Scotland	16	4	6	6	21	21	+0	25.00
Serbia	24	8	7	9	31	27	+4	33.33
Slovenia	14	6	3	5	24	22	+2	42.86
Spain	19	4	4	11	26	42	−16	21.05
Sweden	8	3	3	2	13	7	+6	37.50
Switzerland	28	8	9	11	34	50	−16	28.57
Turkey	19	7	1	11	20	30	−10	36.84
Ukraine	10	3	4	3	9	12	−3	30.00
Wales	9	8	1	0	19	5	+14	88.89

== Other competitions ==
This section contains the results in other competitions. These results do not count into statistics above.

=== UEFA Youth League ===
This section contains the results of Slovak football clubs in UEFA Youth League, a competition held by UEFA for youth teams.

Season	Club	Round	Opponent	Home	Away	Agg
UEFA Youth League
2013–15	None					
2015–16	Senica	1R	Torino	0–0	1–2	1–2
2016–17	Nitra	1R	Málaga	2–3	0–5	2–8
2017–18	Nitra	1R	Shkëndija	1–0	1–1	2–1
2017–18	Nitra	2R	Soligorsk	3–0	0–2	3–2
2017–18	Nitra	PO	Feyenoord	2–3	—N/a	2–3
2018–19	Žilina	1R	Montpellier	1–5	0–2	1–7
2019–20	Slovan Bratislava	1R	Ludogorets Razgrad	1–0	0–1	1–1 (4–2 p)
2019–20	Slovan Bratislava	2R	Rangers	1–2	0–2	1–4
2020–21	Competition not held					
2021–22	Žilina	1R	PAOK	2–0	5–1	7–1
2021–22	Žilina	2R	Kairat	3–2	0–1	3–3 (3–0 p)
2021–22	Žilina	PO	Internazionale	3–1	—N/a	3–1
2021–22	Žilina	R16	Red Bull Salzburg	1–1	—N/a	1–1 (3–4 p)
2022–23	Trenčín	1R	Žalgiris	4–0	1–2	5–2
2022–23	Trenčín	2R	Panathinaikos	3–4	0–2	3–6
2023–24	Žilina	1R	Pafos	5–0	1–0	6–0
2023–24	Žilina	2R	Sparta Prague	4–4	2–2	6–6 (4–2 p)
2023–24	Žilina	PO	Borussia Dortmund	2–1	—N/a	2–1
2023–24	Žilina	R16	Copenhagen	1–1	—N/a	1–1 (2–4 p)
2024–25	Slovan Bratislava	LS	Celtic	—N/a	0–4	35th
2024–25	Slovan Bratislava	LS	Manchester City	0–4	—N/a	35th
2024–25	Slovan Bratislava	LS	Girona	—N/a	2–2	35th
2024–25	Slovan Bratislava	LS	Dinamo Zagreb	2–2	—N/a	35th
2024–25	Slovan Bratislava	LS	AC Milan	2–3	—N/a	35th
2024–25	Slovan Bratislava	LS	Atlético	—N/a	0–5	35th
2024–25	Trenčín	2R	Zbrojovka Brno	3–2	3–1	6–3
2024–25	Trenčín	3R	Olympiacos	1–1	1–4	2–5
2025–26	Žilina	2R	Shelbourne	2–2	0–0	2–2 (2–0 p)
2025–26	Žilina	3R	Red Star Belgrade	2–0	1–3	3–3 (7–6 p)
2025–26	Žilina	R32	Liverpool F.C	2–1	—N/a	2–1
2025–26	Žilina	R16	Club Brugge	0–1	—N/a	0–1
2026–27	Slovan Bratislava	LS	PSG	—N/a	1–6	TBD
2026–27	Slovan Bratislava	LS	VfB Stuttgart	–	—N/a	TBD
2026–27	Slovan Bratislava	LS	AS Roma	—N/a	–	TBD
2026–27	Slovan Bratislava	LS	LASK	—N/a	–	TBD
2026–27	Slovan Bratislava	LS	Real Betis	–	—N/a	TBD
2026–27	Slovan Bratislava	LS	Shakhtar	–	—N/a	TBD

=== Women's football ===
==== UEFA Women's Champions League ====
This section contains the results of Slovak football clubs in UEFA Women's Champions League, a competition held by UEFA for women's football teams.

Season	Club	Round	Opponent	Home	Away	Agg
UEFA Women's Cup
2001–02	Žilina	G-2	Kavala	—N/a	1–2	—N/a
2001–02	Žilina	G-2	Ter Leede	—N/a	0–1	—N/a
2001–02	Žilina	G-2	Ryazan	—N/a	0–13	—N/a
2002–03	None					
2003–04	Žiar nad Hronom	G-A2	Lombardini Skopje	—N/a	12–1	—N/a
2003–04	Žiar nad Hronom	G-A2	Neulengbach	—N/a	3–6	—N/a
2003–04	Žiar nad Hronom	G-A2	PAOK Ledra	15–0	—N/a	—N/a
2004–05	Žiar nad Hronom	G-A1	Slavia Prague	—N/a	0–4	—N/a
2004–05	Žiar nad Hronom	G-A1	Alma	0–4	—N/a	—N/a
2004–05	Žiar nad Hronom	G-A1	Sofia	—N/a	2–2	—N/a
2005–06	PVFA	G-A8	Krka	—N/a	4–1	—N/a
2005–06	PVFA	G-A8	Lada Togliatti	—N/a	0–6	—N/a
2005–06	PVFA	G-A8	Sarajevo	0–1	—N/a	—N/a
2006–07	Šaľa	G-A7	Clujana	—N/a	1–0	—N/a
2006–07	Šaľa	G-A7	Alma	—N/a	2–5	—N/a
2006–07	Šaľa	G-A7	Rossiyanka	1–6	—N/a	—N/a
2007–08	Šaľa	G-A6	Lyon	—N/a	0–12	—N/a
2007–08	Šaľa	G-A6	Sarajevo	—N/a	0–2	—N/a
2007–08	Šaľa	G-A6	Skiponjat	—N/a	1–3	—N/a
2008–09	Šaľa	G-A5	Maccabi Holon	—N/a	1–1	—N/a
2008–09	Šaľa	G-A5	Valur	—N/a	2–6	—N/a
2008–09	Šaľa	G-A5	Cardiff City	0–0	—N/a	—N/a
UEFA Women's Champions League
2009–10	Šaľa	Q-D	Torres	—N/a	0–1	—N/a
2009–10	Šaľa	Q-D	Krka	—N/a	2–2	—N/a
2009–10	Šaľa	Q-D	Trabzonspor	—N/a	2–1	—N/a
2010–11	Slovan Bratislava	Q-7	Duisburg	—N/a	0–3	—N/a
2010–11	Slovan Bratislava	Q-7	Glasgow City	—N/a	0–4	—N/a
2010–11	Slovan Bratislava	Q-7	Crusaders	—N/a	1–0	—N/a
2011–12	Slovan Bratislava	Q-6	Racibórz	—N/a	1–0	—N/a
2011–12	Slovan Bratislava	Q-6	Vantaa	—N/a	0–1	—N/a
2011–12	Slovan Bratislava	Q-6	Ada	—N/a	16–0	—N/a
2012–13	Slovan Bratislava	Q-4	Racibórz	0–5	—N/a	—N/a
2012–13	Slovan Bratislava	Q-4	Bobruichanka	3–2	—N/a	—N/a
2012–13	Slovan Bratislava	Q-4	Ekonomist	8–0	—N/a	—N/a
2013–14	Nové Zámky	Q-7	Apollon	—N/a	0–2	—N/a
2013–14	Nové Zámky	Q-7	Tel Aviv	—N/a	0–0	—N/a
2013–14	Nové Zámky	Q-7	Chișinău	—N/a	6–0	—N/a
2014–15	Nové Zámky	Q-4	Glasgow City	—N/a	0–5	—N/a
2014–15	Nové Zámky	Q-4	Kharkiv	—N/a	1–3	—N/a
2014–15	Nové Zámky	Q-4	Glentoran	—N/a	2–5	—N/a
2015–16	Nové Zámky	Q-8	Vantaa	—N/a	0–9	—N/a
2015–16	Nové Zámky	Q-8	Kharkiv	—N/a	0–5	—N/a
2015–16	Nové Zámky	Q-8	Rīgas	—N/a	2–3	—N/a
2016–17	Slovan Bratislava	Q-5	Zürich	—N/a	1–3	—N/a
2016–17	Slovan Bratislava	Q-5	Pomurje	—N/a	2–4	—N/a
2016–17	Slovan Bratislava	Q-5	Vllaznia	—N/a	2–1	—N/a
2017–18	Bardejov	Q-1	Gintra	—N/a	0–4	—N/a
2017–18	Bardejov	Q-1	Belediyespor	—N/a	1–5	—N/a
2017–18	Bardejov	Q-1	Martve	—N/a	3–0	—N/a
2018–19	Slovan Bratislava	Q-2	Barcelona FA	—N/a	0–2	—N/a
2018–19	Slovan Bratislava	Q-2	Minsk	—N/a	0–1	—N/a
2018–19	Slovan Bratislava	Q-2	Ljubljana	—N/a	1–0	—N/a
2019–20	Slovan Bratislava	Q-5	Subotica	0–7	—N/a	—N/a
2019–20	Slovan Bratislava	Q-5	Ferencváros	1–3	—N/a	—N/a
2019–20	Slovan Bratislava	Q-5	Agarista-ȘS	1–0	—N/a	—N/a
2020–21	Slovan Bratislava	1QR	Gintra	—N/a	0–4	0–4
2021–22	Slovan Bratislava	1QR	Kazygurt	—N/a	0–4	0–4
2021–22	Slovan Bratislava	1QR	Birkirkara	—N/a	0–0	1–0 (e.t.)
2022–23	Spartak Myjava	1QR	Breznica	—N/a	3–2	3–2
2022–23	Spartak Myjava	1QR	Vllaznia	—N/a	0–1	0–1
2023–24	Spartak Myjava	1QR	Cluj	—N/a	2–6	2–6
2023–24	Spartak Myjava	1QR	Ferencváros	—N/a	0–7	0–7
2024–25	Spartak Myjava	1QR	Osijek	—N/a	0–2	0–2
2024–25	Spartak Myjava	1QR	Dinamo Minsk	—N/a	2–3	2–3
2025–26	Spartak Myjava	1QR	Budućnost Podgorica	3–0	—N/a	3–0
2025–26	Spartak Myjava	1QR	Swieqi United	1–1	—N/a	2–1 (e.t.)
2025–26	Spartak Myjava	2QR	Mura	—N/a	2–3	2–3
2025–26	Spartak Myjava	2QR	BIIK Shymkent	—N/a	1–2	1–2
2026–27	Spartak Myjava	1QR	Mġarr United	6–1	—N/a	6–1
2026–27	Spartak Myjava	2QR	Vllaznia	—N/a	2–1	2–1
2026–27	Spartak Myjava	2QR	Czarni Sosnowiec	—N/a	2–4	2–4

==== UEFA Women's Europa Cup ====
This section contains the results of Slovak football clubs in UEFA Women's Europa Cup, a second-tier competition held by UEFA for women's football teams.

Season	Club	Round	Opponent	Home	Away	Agg
UEFA Women's Europa Cup
2025–26	None					
2026–27	Spartak Myjava	2QR	PAOK		–	

=== Mitropa Cup ===
This section contains the results of Slovak football clubs in Mitropa Cup.

Season	Club	Round	Opponent	Home	Away	Agg	Play-off
Mitropa Cup
1927 Mitropa Cup - 1940 Mitropa Cup	No participation						
1941-50	Not held						
1951	No partipcation						
1952-54	Not held						
1955	Slovan	QF	Vojvodina	3–0	0–0	3–0	—N/a
1955	Slovan	SF	ÚDA Praha	2–2	0–0	2–2	1–2
1956	Slovan	QF	Rapid Wien	3–1	0–3	3–4	—N/a
1957	Slovan	QF	Vojvodina	1–0	0–6	1–6	—N/a
1958	Tatran Prešov	R16	Partizan	2–4	4–1	6–5	—N/a
1958	Tatran Prešov	QF	MTK	1–0	3–4	4–4 (away goal rule)	—N/a
1959	No participation						
1960	Inter	1R	Tatabányai	3–3	1–2	6–5	—N/a
1960	Trnava	1R	Roma	2–0	0–1	2–1	—N/a
1960	Slovan	1R	Partizan	4–1	1–2	5–3	—N/a
1961	Inter	G-2	Nitra	2–4	—N/a	2nd	
1961	Inter	G-2	Torino	—N/a	4–2	2nd	
1961	Inter	G-2	SV Stickstoff	8–2	—N/a	2nd	
1961	Nitra	G-2	Inter Bratislava	—N/a	4–2	1st	—N/a
1961	Nitra	G-2	Torino	5–1	—N/a	1st	
1961	Nitra	G-2	SV Stickstoff	—N/a	4–4	1st	
1961	Nitra	SF	Udinese	4–3	1–1	5–4	
1961	Nitra	F	Bologna	2–2	0–3	2–5	
1962	Slovan	G-3	Honvéd	1–2	2–1	3rd	
1962	Slovan	G-3	Bologna	2–1	0–3	3rd	
1962	Slovan	G-3	Red Star Belgrade	1–0	2–2	3rd	
1962	Trnava	G-4	Vojvodina	0–0	1–0	4th	
1962	Trnava	G-4	Vasas	2–2	0–5	4th	
1962	Trnava	G-4	Fiorentina	1–6	3–4	4th	
1963	No partipcation						
1964	Slovan	QF	Željezničar Sarajevo	3–0	1–2	4–2	
1964	Slovan	SF	Vasas	1–1	2–1	3–2	
1964	Slovan	F	Sparta Prague	0–0	0–2	0–2	
1965	No partipcation						
1966	TTS Trenčín	1R	Admira Wien	4–0	1–2	5–2	
1966	TTS Trenčín	2R	Red Star Belgrade	3–1	1–0	4–1	
1966	TTS Trenčín	SF	Vasas	—N/a	1–0	1–0	
1966	TTS Trenčín	F	Fiorentina	—N/a	0–1	0–1	
1966–67	Slovan	R16	Újpest	1–1	1–5	2–6	
1966–67	Trnava	R16	Honvéd	4–0	1–1	5–1	
1966–67	Trnava	QF	Lazio	1–0	1–1	2–1	
1966–67	Trnava	SF	Fiorentina	2–0	1–2	3–2	
1966–67	Trnava	F	Újpest	3–1	2–3	5–4	
1967–68	TTS Trenčín	R16	Željezničar Sarajevo	0–0	0–1	0–1	
1967–68	Inter	R16	Tatabányai	7–0	1–3	8–3	
1967–68	Inter	QF	Red Star Belgrade	3–2	0–3	3–5	
1967–68	Trnava	R16	Roma	2–1	1–1	3–2	
1967–68	Trnava	QF	Željezničar Sarajevo	2–1	2–2	4–3	
1967–68	Trnava	SF	Vardar	4–1	2–2	6–3	
1967–68	Trnava	F	Red Star Belgrade	1–0	1–4	2–4	
1968–69	Inter	R16	Palermo	3–0	0–1	3–1	
1968–69	Inter	QF	Admira Wacker	1–1	2–2	3–3 (a)	
1968–69	Inter	SF	Vasas	2–2	1–0	3–2	
1968–69	Inter	F	Teplice	4–1	0–0	4–1	
1969–70	Lokomotíva Košice	R16	Radnički	1–0	0–2	1–2	
1969–70	Inter	R16	First Vienna	6–1	w/o	6–1	
1969–70	Inter	QF	Wacker Innsbruck	0–1	3–0	1–3	
1969–70	Inter	SF	Honvéd	2–1	1–0	3–1	
1969–70	Inter	F	Vasas	2–1	1–4	3–5	

== UEFA coefficient and ranking ==
For the 2022–23 UEFA competitions, the associations were allocated places according to their 2021 UEFA country coefficients, which take into account their performance in European competitions from 2016–17 to 2020–12. In the 2021 rankings used for the 2022–23 European competitions, Slovakia's coefficient points total is 13.625 and is ranked by UEFA as the 32nd best association in Europe out of 55.

- 30 Poland 15.125
- 31 Slovenia 14.250
- 32 Slovakia 13.625
- 33 Liechtenstein9.000
- 34 Lithuania 8.750
  - Full list

=== UEFA country coefficient history ===
(As of 1 Jun 2024), Source: Bert Kassies website.

Accumulated	Valid	Rank	Movement	Coefficient	Change
1989–90 to 1993–94	1995–96	37	Steady	2.333	Steady
1990–91 to 1994–95	1996–97	29	▲ +8	7.999	▲ +5.666
1991–92 to 1995–96	1997–98	27	▲ +2	10.999	▲ +3.000
1992–93 to 1996–97	1998–99	27	Steady	15.999	▲ +5.000
1993–94 to 1997–98	1999–00	21	▲ +6	20.999	▲ +5.000
1994–95 to 1998–99	2000–01	24	▼ –3	14.332	▼ –6.667
1995–96 to 1999–00	2001–02	25	▼ –1	12.832	▼ –1.500
1996–97 to 2000–01	2002–03	25	Steady	14.665	▲ +1.833
1997–98 to 2001–02	2003–04	24	▲ +1	15.665	▲ +1.000
1998–99 to 2002–03	2004–05	25	▼ –1	13.665	▼ –2.000
1999–00 to 2003–04	2005–06	27	▼ –2	12.832	▼ –0.838
2000–01 to 2004–05	2006–07	27	Steady	11.665	▼ –1.167
2001–02 to 2005–06	2007–08	27	Steady	12.332	▲ +0.667
2002–03 to 2006–07	2008–09	25	▲ +2	10.832	▼ –1.500
2003–04 to 2007–08	2009–10	24	▲ +1	12.332	▲ +1.500
2004–05 to 2008–09	2010–11	25	▼ –1	14.665	▲ +2.333
2005–06 to 2009–10	2011–12	23	▲ +2	15.832	▲ +1.167
2006–07 to 2010–11	2012–13	25	▼ –2	14.499	▼ –0.833
2007–08 to 2011–12	2013–14	25	Steady	14.874	▲ +0.375
2008–09 to 2012–13	2014–15	26	▼ –1	14.208	▼ –0.666
2009–10 to 2013–14	2015–16	30	▼ –4	11.000	▼ –3.208
2010–11 to 2014–15	2016–17	30	Steady	11.250	▲ +0.250
2011–12 to 2015–16	2017–18	31	▼ –1	12.000	▲ +0.750
2012–13 to 2016–17	2018–19	31	Steady	11.750	▼ –0.250
2013–14 to 2017–18	2019–20	32	▼ –1	12.125	▲ +0.375
2013–14 to 2018–19	2020–21	30	▲ +2	15.625	▲ +3.500
2014–15 to 2019–20	2021–22	30	Steady	15.875	▲ +0.200
2015–16 to 2020–21	2022–23	32	▼ –2	13.625	▼ –2.250
2016–17 to 2021–22	2023–24	30	▲ +2	15.625	▲ +2.000
2017–18 to 2022–23	2024–25	28	▲ +2	19.750	▲ +4.125
2018–19 to 2023–24	2025–26	29	▼ –1	19.625	▼ –0.125
