= Jana Vojteková =

Slovak footballer (born 1991)

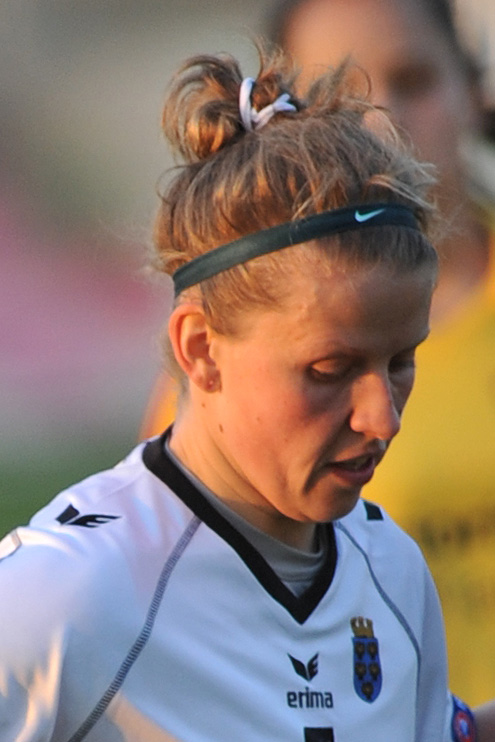
- Vojteková in 2014

Personal information
- Date of birth: 12 August 1991 (age 35)
- Place of birth: Trnava, Czechoslovakia
- Position: Defender

Team information
- Current team: SC Freiburg
- Number: 20

Senior career*
Years	Team	Apps	(Gls)
2007–2012	Slovan Duslo Šaľa		
2012–2013	Slovan Bratislava	3	(0)
2013–2015	Neulengbach	29	(8)
2015–2019	Sand	75	(8)
2017	Sand II	1	(0)
2019–2023	Freiburg	75	(8)
2019	Freiburg II	2	(1)
2023–2026	Basel	33	(4)
2026–	SC Freiburg	3	(0)

International career^{‡}
2007–2010	Slovakia U19	9	(0)
2010–	Slovakia	136	(14)
- * Club domestic league appearances and goals as of 13 September 2026 ‡ National team caps and goals as of 3 July 2026

Jana Vojteková (born 12 August 1991) is a Slovak footballer who plays as a defender for Bundesliga club Freiburg and the Slovakia national team.

== International goals ==
Scores and results list Slovakia's goal tally first.

No.	Date	Venue	Opponent	Score	Result	Competition
1.	26 October 2015	NTC Senec, Senec, Slovakia	Moldova	4–0	4–0	UEFA Women's Euro 2017 qualifying
2.	12 April 2016	NTC Poprad, Poprad, Slovakia	Poland	1–1	2–1	UEFA Women's Euro 2017 qualifying
3.	28 November 2017	Štadión pod Dubňom, Žilina, Slovakia	Northern Ireland	1–0	1–3	2019 FIFA Women's World Cup qualifying
4.	4 October 2019	Daugava Stadium, Liepāja, Latvia	Latvia	2–1	2–1	UEFA Women's Euro 2022 qualifying
5.	1 September 2022	Tengiz Burjanadze Stadium, Gori, Georgia	Georgia	4–0	4–0	2023 FIFA Women's World Cup qualification

== Honours ==
Slovan Šaľa

- Slovak First League (1): 2007/08
- Slovak Cup (1): 2009/10; runner-up: 2008/09

Slovan Bratislava

- Slovak Cup (1): 2012/13

Neulengbach

- ÖFB-Frauenliga (1): 2013/14; runner-up: 2014/15
- ÖFB Ladies Cup; runner-up: 2013/14, 2014/15

Sand

- DFB-Pokal; runner-up: 2015/16, 2016/17

Freiburg

- DFB-Pokal; runner-up: 2022/23
