= Lucia El-Dahaibiová =

Slovak footballer

Personal information
- Full name: Lucia El-Dahaibiová
- Date of birth: 22 January 1989 (age 37)
- Place of birth: Nové Zámky, Czechoslovakia (now Slovakia)
- Position: Goalkeeper

Senior career*
Years	Team	Apps	(Gls)
2004–2009	Union Nové Zámky		
2009–2012	Slovan Duslo Šaľa		
2012–2013	Slovan Bratislava		
2013	Sporting de Huelva		
2015–2017	USC Landhaus Wien		
2017–2018	SKN St. Pölten		
2018–2019	USC Landhaus Wien		

International career^{‡}
2011–	Slovakia	38	(0)
- * Club domestic league appearances and goals ‡ National team caps and goals as of 15 February 2022

Lucia El-Dahaibiová (born 22 January 1989) is a Slovak footballer who plays as a goalkeeper.

El-Dahaibiová started her career in 2004 in Union Nové Zámky. She subsequently spent two seasons on loan in Slovan Duslo Šaľa, with which she debuted in the UEFA Women's Cup in 2008, and the following year she signed for the team. In 2011, she debuted for the Slovak national team in a 2013 Euro qualifiers' 3-1 win over Estonia. As of January 2014 she is Mária Korenčiová's reserve.

In 2012, El-Dahaibiová signed for Slovan Bratislava, and in 2013 she moved to Spain to play for Sporting de Huelva, which she left in the winter break.
