= Andrea Horváthová =

Slovak footballer

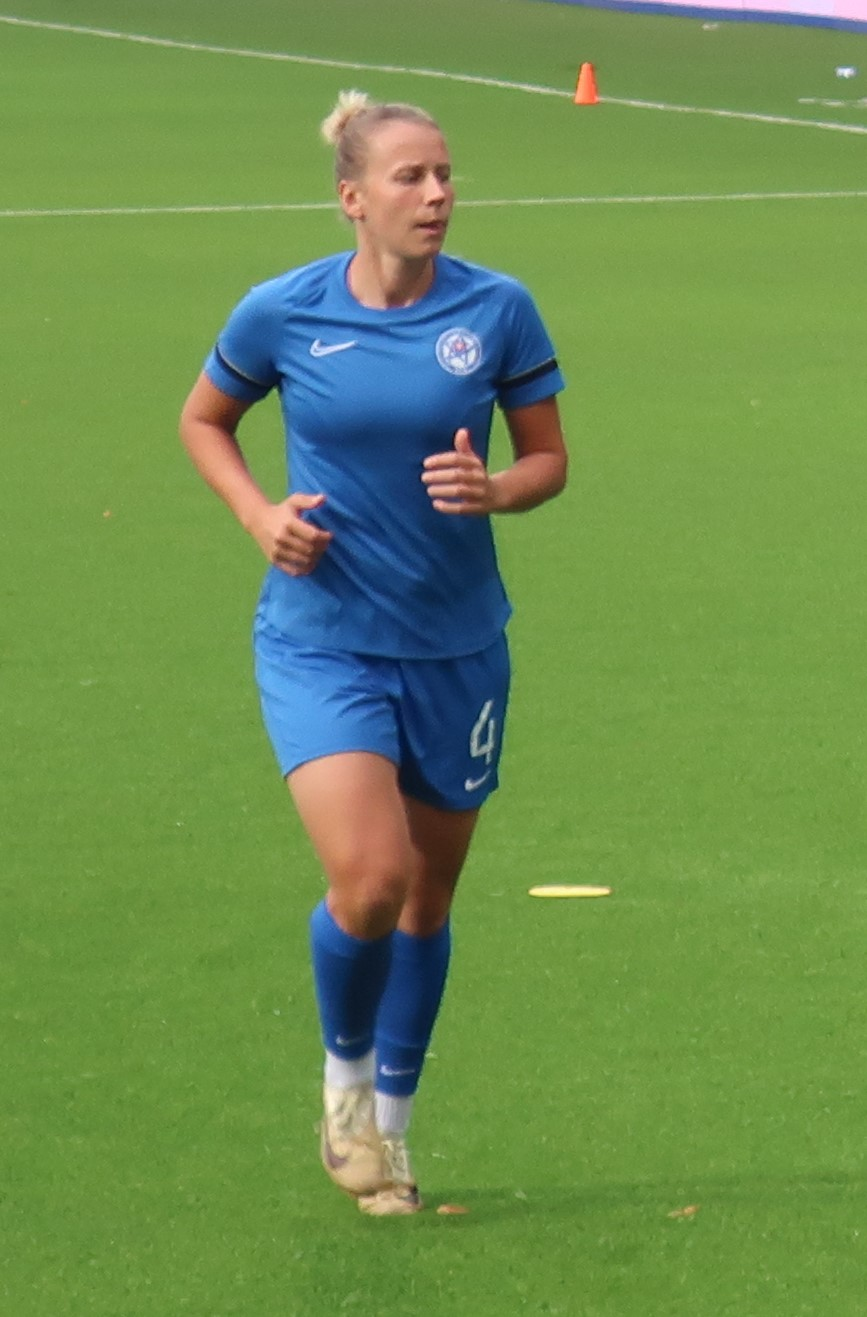
- Horvathova with Slovakia in 2023

Personal information
- Date of birth: 5 October 1995 (age 31)
- Position: Midfielder

Team information
- Current team: Górnik Łęczna
- Number: 4

Youth career
- ŠK Štich Humenné

Senior career*
Years	Team	Apps	(Gls)
2012–2016	Union Nové Zámky		
2016–2025	Czarni Sosnowiec		
2025–	Górnik Łęczna	13	(0)

International career^{‡}
2015–	Slovakia	75	(0)
- * Club domestic league appearances and goals as of 21:01, 2 June 2026 (UTC) ‡ National team caps and goals as of 21:01, 2 June 2026 (UTC)

Andrea Horváthová (born 5 October 1995) is a Slovak professional footballer who plays as a midfielder for Ekstraliga club Górnik Łęczna and the Slovakia national team.

== Career ==
Horváthová has been capped for the Slovakia national team, appearing for the team during the 2019 FIFA Women's World Cup qualifying cycle.

== Honours ==
Union Nové Zámky

- Slovak First League: 2012–13, 2013–14, 2014–15
- Slovak Cup: 2013–14, 2014–15

Czarni Sosnowiec

- Ekstraliga: 2020–21
- Polish Cup: 2020–21, 2021–22, 2024–25
