= FC Nitra (women) =

Professional football club

FC Nitra ženy
- Full name: Futbalový club Nitra ženy
- Nickname: Trogári (Trogárky)
- Founded: 2013; 13 years ago
- Ground: Štadión pod Zoborom, Nitra
- Capacity: 7,246
- Owner: FC Nitra a. s.
- Manager: Ivan Papazov
- League: 2. liga
- 2025-26: 2. liga, 3th of 8
- Website: fcnitra.sk
| Home colours | Away colours |

FC Nitra Women (Slovak: FC Nitra ženy) is a professional football club based in the town of Nitra, that competes in the 2. liga, which is the second-highest women's football league in Slovakia. The women's team is affiliated to FC Nitra. The club plays its home matches at Štadión pod Zoborom. FC Nitra initially established a girls' youth team in 2013, and a women's team was also formed in the summer of 2014.

== History ==
The women's section of FC Nitra was established in 2013. In 2014, the senior women's team was formed. In its very first season, the club won its second-division group and played in a play-off for promotion to the top division. Although the club lost the play-off against Myjava, it was nevertheless promoted to the top division because another club did not enter the top division.

From the 2015–16 season onwards, the club competed in the top division, finishing fifth out of ten teams in its first season there. In the following seasons, the club regularly finished in the middle of the league table. In the 2020–21 season, the club finished fourth, which was its best finish in its history. In the following season, however, the club finished as low as eighth and was placed in the relegation group. The club finished last in this group and was relegated to the second division.

Due to the club's financial problems, most of the squad left for other clubs, and FC Nitra therefore did not participate in the following season of the second division. After new owners took over FC Nitra, the club returned to the second-highest division in the 2025–26 season, finishing fourth. The club subsequently played in the promotion group, where it finished in third place.

== Players ==
=== Current squad ===
As of 13 August 2026

Note: Flags indicate national team as defined under FIFA eligibility rules; some limited exceptions apply. Players may hold more than one non-FIFA nationality.

| No. | Pos. | Nation | Player |
|---|---|---|---|
| 3 | MF | SVK | Dominika Jablonická |
| 5 | MF | SVK | Kritína Cerovská |
| 6 | DF | SVK | Klaudia Kajabová |
| 8 | MF | SVK | Alexandra Farkašová |
| 9 | DF | SVK | Lenka Čoknayova |
| 11 | MF | SVK | Martina Nagyová |
| 13 | DF | SVK | Lenka Zelinková (captain) |
| 16 | FW | SVK | Viktória Csámpayová |
| 17 | MF | SVK | Kristína Palová |
| 18 | DF | SVK | Sára Holá |
| 19 | DF | SVK | Monika Trnková |
| 20 | FW | SVK | Rebeka Bugárová |

| No. | Pos. | Nation | Player |
|---|---|---|---|
| 22 | GK | SVK | Patrícia Chrenáková |
| — | DF | SVK | Tamarka Blahová |
| — | DF | SVK | Sofia Labudová |
| — | DF | SVK | Nikola Griačová |
| — | MF | SVK | Vanda Buláková |
| — | MF | SVK | Katarína Tancíková |
| — | MF | SVK | Ivana Bojdová |
| — | MF | SVK | Vanesa Gajdošíková |
| — | MF | SVK | Barbora Kozlová |
| — | FW | SVK | Vanessa Szabóová |
| — | FW | SVK | Karin Miková |

== Current technical staff ==
As of 13 August 2026

| Staff | Job title |
|---|---|
| (Slovakia) Ivan Papazov | Manager |
| (Slovakia) Ladislav Turba | Assistant manager |

== Honours ==
- 2. slovenská futbalová liga žien
  - Winners (1): 2014-15 (Group A)
