= Ivana Bojdová =

Slovak footballer

Personal information
- Full name: Ivana Bojdová
- Date of birth: 27 May 1985 (age 41)
- Place of birth: Czechoslovakia
- Height: 1.65 m (5 ft 5 in)
- Position: Midfielder

Senior career*
Years	Team	Apps	(Gls)
- Nitra
- Slovan Duslo Šaľa
2010–2012	Unia Racibórz		(7)

International career
2001–	Slovakia		
- * Club domestic league appearances and goals

Ivana Bojdová is a Slovak footballer who plays as a midfielder. She previously played for Slovan Duslo Šaľa in the Slovak First League and Unia Racibórz in the Polish Ekstraliga. She has played the Champions League with both teams.

She is a member of the Slovak national team since 2001.

== Honours ==
Unia Racibórz

- Ekstraliga: 2010–11, 2011–12,
- Polish Cup: 2010–11, 2011–12
