= 2020–21 Slovak Women's First League =

27th season of top women's football league in Slovakia

Slovak Women's First League
- Season: 2020–21
- Champions League: ŠK Slovan Bratislava (women)

The 2020–21 Slovak Women's First League was the 27th season of the Slovak's top-tier football league for women also known as 1. liga, ženy and I Liga Women. Slovan Bratislava was the defending champions. The season was abandoned due to the COVID-19 pandemic in Slovakia.

== Teams ==
=== Locations ===
Location of teams in 2020–21 Slovak Women's First League

== League table ==
Pos	Team	Pld	W	D	L	GF	GA	GD	Pts	Qualification
1	Slovan Bratislava	7	6	0	1	50	3	+47	18	Qualification for the Champions League first round
2	Partizán Bardejov	5	5	0	0	24	0	+24	15	
3	Spartak Myjava	6	4	0	2	36	5	+31	12	
4	FC Nitra	5	4	0	1	18	15	+3	12	
5	AS Trenčín	7	4	0	3	20	27	−7	12	
6	FC Petržalka	6	3	0	3	19	16	+3	9	
7	MŠK Žilina	6	2	0	4	7	24	−17	6	
8	Spartak Trnava	6	1	1	4	7	21	−14	4	
9	Dukla Banská Bystrica	6	0	1	5	2	39	−37	1	
10	FK Poprad	6	0	0	6	1	34	−33	0	

Updated to match(es) played on unknown. Source: Soccerway, Sportnet.sme.sk
Rules for classification: 1) Points; 2) Head-to-head points; 3) Head-to-head goal difference; 4) Head-to-head away goals scored; 5) Play-off.

== Results ==
Each team plays home-and-away against every other team in the league, for a total of 18 matches each.

Home \ Away	SBA	PAR	SMY	NIT	TRE	PET	ŽIL	STR	DBB	POP
Slovan Bratislava		0–1			7–1		8–0	9–0	13–0	
Partizán Bardejov			1–0						8–0	10–0
Spartak Myjava	1–3				13–0		7–0		6–0	
FC Nitra	0–10				3–1			4–1		
AS Trenčín							2–1	5–0		
FC Petržalka				3–5	3–5					
MŠK Žilina		0–4				5–3				1–0
Spartak Trnava						0–2				5–0
Dukla Banská Bystrica					0–6	1–5		1–1		
FK Poprad			1–9	0–6		0–3				

Updated to match(es) played on December 2020. Source: Futbalnet (in Slovak)
Legend: Blue = home team win; Yellow = draw; Red = away team win.

== Controversy ==
The Executive Committee of the Slovak Football Association decided to cancel the 2020–21 season in all youth and women's competitions conducted by the Slovak Football Association. At the time of the decision, Partizán Bardejov were in second place, three points behind Slovan who had however played two more matches. Partizán even defeated Slovan in an away match and remained the only undefeated team in the league. Slovak footballer Marek Hamšík expressed support for Partizán.

As a consequence of this decision, Partizán did not apply to the next season and women's football in Bardejov ended due to financial problems. If the club had started in the Champions League, they would have earned prize money of at least €90,000, which would have been enough to fund the club for the next season.
