= 2021–22 UEFA Women's Champions League =

21st edition of top European women's football competition

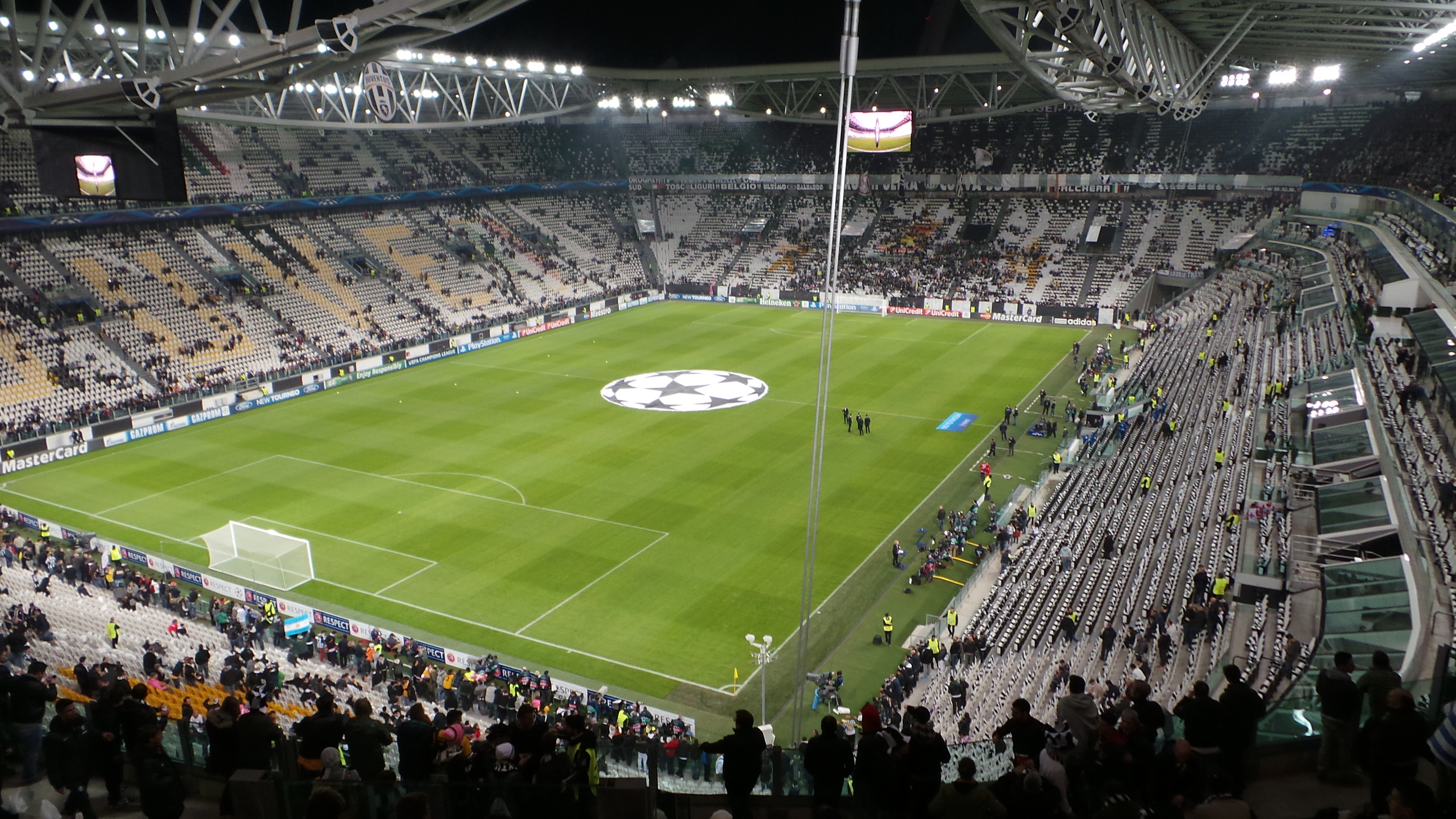
- The Juventus Stadium in Turin hosted the final

Tournament details
- Dates: Qualifying rounds: 17 August – 9 September 2021; Competition proper: 5 October 2021 – 21 May 2022
- Teams: Competition proper: 16; Total: 72 (from 50 associations)

Final positions
- Champions: (France) Lyon (8th title)
- Runners-up: (Spain) Barcelona

Tournament statistics
- Matches played: 61
- Goals scored: 220 (3.61 per match)
- Attendance: 551,578 (9,042 per match)
- Top scorer(s): Alexia Putellas; 11 goals
- Best player: Alexia Putellas (Barcelona)
- Best young player: Selma Bacha (Lyon)

The 2021–22 UEFA Women's Champions League was the 21st edition of the European women's club football championship organised by UEFA, and the 13th edition since being rebranded as the UEFA Women's Champions League. It was the first edition to feature a double-round-robin group stage, in the same manner as the men's UEFA Champions League.

The final was held at the Juventus Stadium in Turin, Italy. The winners of the 2021–22 UEFA Women's Champions League automatically qualified for the 2022–23 UEFA Women's Champions League group stage.

The video assistant referee (VAR), previously only deployed for the final, was used for all matches in the knockout stage.

On 24 June 2021, UEFA approved the proposal to abolish the away goals rule in all UEFA club competitions, which had been used since 1965. Therefore, if in a two-legged tie, two teams scored the same number of aggregate goals, the winner of tie was not decided by the number of away goals scored by each team, but always by 30 minutes of extra time, and if the two teams scored the same number of goals in extra time, the winner was decided by a penalty shoot-out.

Barcelona were the defending champions, but lost the final to Lyon, who won a record eighth title.

With all participating countries now allowing full crowds for outdoor sporting events, attendance (from Group Stage onward) zoomed up to 552k, more than doubling the competition's previous record of 228k from the 2016-17 edition, helped by record crowds for women's club football (over 90,000) at both knockout matches held at Camp Nou.

== Association team allocation ==
The association ranking based on the UEFA women's country coefficients was used to determine the number of participating teams for each association:

- Associations 1–6 each had three teams qualify.
- Associations 7–16 each had two teams qualify.
- All other associations, if they entered, each had one team qualify.
- The winners of the 2020–21 UEFA Women's Champions League were given an additional entry if they did not qualify for the 2021–22 UEFA Women's Champions League through their domestic league. However, the title holders qualified through their domestic league, meaning the additional entry was not necessary for this season.

An association had to have an eleven-a-side women's domestic league to enter a team. As of 2019–20, 52 of the 55 UEFA member associations organized a women's domestic league, with the exceptions being Andorra, Liechtenstein and San Marino.

=== Association ranking ===
For the 2021–22 UEFA Women's Champions League, the associations were allocated places according to their 2020 UEFA women's Association coefficients, which took into account their performance in European competitions from 2015–16 to 2019–20.

Association ranking for 2021–22 UEFA Women's Champions League

Rank	Association	Coeff.	Teams
1	France	96.000	3
2	Germany	73.000	3
3	Spain	58.000	3
4	England	56.500	3
5	Sweden	45.500	3
6	Czech Republic	40.500	3
7	Denmark	34.500	2
8	Netherlands	33.000	2
9	Italy	30.500	2
10	Kazakhstan	29.000	2
11	Norway	27.500	2
12	Iceland	26.000	2
13	Switzerland	24.000	2
14	Scotland	23.000	2
15	Russia	22.500	2
16	Belarus	19.000	2
17	Cyprus	16.000	1
18	Serbia	15.500	1
19	Austria	15.000	1

Rank	Association	Coeff.	Teams
20	Lithuania	14.500	1
21	Poland	14.500	1
22	Belgium	12.500	1
23	Portugal	12.000	1
24	Bosnia and Herzegovina	12.000	1
25	Romania	11.000	1
26	Finland	10.500	1
27	Ukraine	10.000	1
28	Greece	9.500	1
29	Hungary	9.000	1
30	Turkey	7.500	1
31	Republic of Ireland	7.500	1
32	Albania	7.000	1
33	Croatia	7.000	1
34	Slovenia	6.000	1
35	Israel	5.000	1
36	Estonia	4.500	1
37	Bulgaria	4.500	1

Rank	Association	Coeff.	Teams
38	Kosovo	4.000	1
39	Slovakia	4.000	1
40	Wales	3.500	1
41	Montenegro	3.000	1
42	Faroe Islands	2.500	1
43	Northern Ireland	2.000	1
44	Malta	1.000	1
45	Latvia	1.000	1
46	Moldova	0.500	1
47	North Macedonia	0.000	1
48	Georgia	0.000	1
49	Luxembourg	0.000	1
50	Armenia	0.000	1
NR	Azerbaijan	—	DNE
NR	Gibraltar	—	DNE
NR	Andorra	—	NL
NR	Liechtenstein	—	NL
NR	San Marino	—	NL

Notes

- NR – No rank (association did not enter in any of the seasons used for computing coefficients)
- DNE – Did not enter
- NL – No women's domestic league

=== Distribution ===
Unlike the men's Champions League, not every association entered a team, and so the exact number of teams entering in each round could not be determined until the full entry list was known. If there were more than 47 teams in the Champions Path qualifying, a preliminary round of two-legged home-and-away matches would have been played by the champions from the lowest-ranked associations. For example, if the title holders had not qualified for the group stage through league position and all 52 associations with a women's domestic league entered, the champions from associations 49–52 would enter the preliminary round. However, only 50 associations entered and this round was skipped.

The following is the access list for this season. As the Champions League title holders, Barcelona, which were guaranteed a berth in the Champions League group stage, already qualified via their domestic league, the following changes to the access list were made:

- The champions of association 4 (England) entered the group stage instead of round 2.
- The champions of association 7 (Denmark) entered round 2 instead of round 1.
- The champions of association 49 (Luxembourg) and 50 (Armenia) entered round 1 instead of the preliminary round, which was skipped.

Access list for 2021–22 UEFA Women's Champions League
	Path	Teams entering in this round	Teams advancing from previous round
Round 1 (Mini-tournament)	Champions Path (43 teams)	43 champions from associations 8–50	
Round 1 (Mini-tournament)	League Path (16 teams)	6 third-placed teams from associations 1–6; 10 runners-up from associations 7–16	
Round 2	Champions Path (14 teams)	3 champions from associations 5–7	11 winners of round 1 (Champions Path)
Round 2	League Path (10 teams)	6 runners-up from associations 1–6	4 winners of round 1 (League Path)
Group stage (16 teams)		4 champions from associations 1–4 (including title holders Barcelona)	7 winners of round 2 (Champions Path); 5 winners of round 2 (League Path)
Knockout phase (8 teams)			4 group winners of group stage; 4 group runners-up of group stage

=== Teams ===
The labels in the parentheses show how each team qualified for the place of its starting round:

- TH: Title holders
- 1st, 2nd, 3rd: League positions of the previous season
- Abd-: League positions of abandoned season due to the COVID-19 pandemic in Europe as determined by the national association; all teams were subject to approval by UEFA as per the guidelines for entry to European competitions in response to the COVID-19 pandemic

The two qualifying rounds, round 1 and round 2, were divided into Champions Path (CH) and League Path (LP).

CC: 2021 UEFA women's club coefficients.

Qualified teams for 2021–22 UEFA Women's Champions League
Entry round		Teams			
Group stage		(Spain) Barcelona (1st)^{TH}	(France) Paris Saint-Germain (1st)	(Germany) Bayern Munich (1st)	(England) Chelsea (1st)
Round 2	CH	(Sweden) BK Häcken (1st)	(Czech Republic) Sparta Prague (1st)	(Denmark) HB Køge (1st)	
Round 2	LP	(France) Lyon (2nd)	(Germany) VfL Wolfsburg (2nd)	(Spain) Real Madrid (2nd)	(England) Manchester City (2nd)
Round 2	LP	(Sweden) Rosengård (2nd)	(Czech Republic) Slavia Prague (2nd)		
Round 1	CH	(Netherlands) Twente (1st)	(Italy) Juventus (1st)	(Kazakhstan) BIIK Kazygurt (1st)	(Norway) Vålerenga (1st)
Round 1	CH	(Iceland) Breiðablik (Abd-1st)	(Switzerland) Servette Chênois (1st)	(Scotland) Glasgow City (1st)	(Russia) CSKA Moscow (1st)
Round 1	CH	(Belarus) Dinamo-BGU Minsk (1st)	(Cyprus) Apollon Limassol (1st)	(Serbia) Spartak Subotica (1st)	(Austria) St. Pölten (1st)
Round 1	CH	(Lithuania) Gintra Universitetas (1st)	(Poland) Czarni Sosnowiec (1st)	(Belgium) Anderlecht (1st)	(Portugal) Benfica (1st)
Round 1	CH	(Bosnia and Herzegovina) SFK 2000 (1st)	(Romania) Olimpia Cluj (1st)	(Finland) Åland United (1st)	(Ukraine) Zhytlobud-1 Kharkiv (1st)
Round 1	CH	(Greece) PAOK (1st)	(Hungary) Ferencváros (1st)	(Turkey) Beşiktaş (1st)	(Republic of Ireland) Peamount United (1st)
Round 1	CH	(Albania) Vllaznia (1st)	(Croatia) Osijek (1st)	(Slovenia) Pomurje (1st)	(Israel) Kiryat Gat (1st)
Round 1	CH	(Estonia) Flora (1st)	(Bulgaria) NSA Sofia (1st)	(Kosovo) Mitrovica (1st)	(Slovakia) Slovan Bratislava (Abd-1st)
Round 1	CH	(Wales) Swansea City (1st)	(Montenegro) Breznica Pljevlja (1st)	(Faroe Islands) KÍ (1st)	(Northern Ireland) Glentoran (1st)
Round 1	CH	(Malta) Birkirkara (Abd-1st)	(Latvia) Rīgas FS (1st)	(Moldova) Agarista Anenii Noi (1st)	(North Macedonia) Kamenica Sasa (1st)
Round 1	CH	(Georgia (country)) Tbilisi Nike (1st)	(Luxembourg) Racing FC (1st)	(Armenia) Hayasa (1st)	
Round 1	LP	(France) Bordeaux (3rd)	(Germany) 1899 Hoffenheim (3rd)	(Spain) Levante (3rd)	(England) Arsenal (3rd)
Round 1	LP	(Sweden) Kristianstad (3rd)	(Czech Republic) Slovácko (3rd)	(Denmark) Brøndby (2nd)	(Netherlands) PSV (2nd)
Round 1	LP	(Italy) Milan (2nd)	(Kazakhstan) Okzhetpes (2nd)	(Norway) Rosenborg (2nd)	(Iceland) Valur (Abd-2nd)
Round 1	LP	(Switzerland) Zürich (2nd)	(Scotland) Celtic (2nd)	(Russia) Lokomotiv Moscow (2nd)	(Belarus) FC Minsk (2nd)

Notes

1. Iceland (ISL): The 2020 Úrvalsdeild kvenna was abandoned due to the COVID-19 pandemic in Iceland. The top two teams of the league at the time of the abandonment based on the average number of points per matches played for each team, Breiðablik (who were declared champions) and Valur, were selected to play in the 2021–22 UEFA UEFA Women's Champions League by the Football Association of Iceland, entering round 1.
2. Malta (MLT): The 2020–21 Maltese Women's First Division was abandoned due to the COVID-19 pandemic in Malta. The top team of the league at the time of the abandonment, Birkirkara, were selected to play in the 2021–22 UEFA Women's Champions League by the Malta Football Association, entering round 1.
3. Slovakia (SVK): The 2020–21 Slovak Women's First League was abandoned due to the COVID-19 pandemic in Slovakia. The top team of the league at the time of the abandonment, Slovan Bratislava, were selected to play in the 2021–22 UEFA Women's Champions League by the Slovak Football Association, entering round 1.

== Schedule ==
The schedule of the competition was as follows.

Schedule for 2021–22 UEFA Women's Champions League
Phase	Round	Draw date	First leg	Second leg
Qualifying	First round	2 July 2021	17–18 August 2021 (semi-finals)	20–21 August 2021 (third-place play-off & final)
Qualifying	Second round	22 August 2021	31 August – 1 September 2021	8–9 September 2021
Group stage	Matchday 1	13 September 2021	5–6 October 2021	
Group stage	Matchday 2	13 September 2021	13–14 October 2021	
Group stage	Matchday 3	13 September 2021	9–10 November 2021	
Group stage	Matchday 4	13 September 2021	17–18 November 2021	
Group stage	Matchday 5	13 September 2021	8–9 December 2021	
Group stage	Matchday 6	13 September 2021	15–16 December 2021	
Knockout phase	Quarter-finals	20 December 2021	22–23 March 2022	30–31 March 2022
Knockout phase	Semi-finals	20 December 2021	23–24 April 2022	30 April – 1 May 2022
Knockout phase	Final	20 December 2021	21 May 2022 at Juventus Stadium, Turin	

== Qualifying rounds ==
A preliminary round consisting of two-legged home-and-away matches would have been played by the champions from the lowest-ranked associations if more than 50 associations had entered the tournament and the title holders had not qualified through league position. Since only 50 associations entered, this round was skipped.

=== Round 1 ===
The draw for Round 1 was held on 2 July 2021, 13:00 CEST. The hosts of each tournament were selected after the draw. The semi-finals were played on 17 and 18 August, and the third-place play-offs and finals on 20 and 21 August 2021. The winners of the finals advanced to round 2.

==== Champions Path ====
Tournament 1

Hosted by Gintra Universitetas.

Semi-finals
18 August
(Lithuania) Gintra Universitetas	2
(Estonia) Flora	0
18 August
(Iceland) Breiðablik	7
(Faroe Islands) KÍ	0

Final
21 August
(Lithuania) Gintra Universitetas	1
(Iceland) Breiðablik	8
Third place
21 August
(Faroe Islands) KÍ	0
(Estonia) Flora	1

Tournament 2

Hosted by Glasgow City.

Semi-finals
18 August
(Kazakhstan) BIIK Kazygurt	4
(Slovakia) Slovan Bratislava	0
18 August
(Scotland) Glasgow City	3
(Malta) Birkirkara	0

Final
21 August
(Kazakhstan) BIIK Kazygurt	0
(Scotland) Glasgow City	1
Third place
21 August
(Slovakia) Slovan Bratislava (a.e.t.)	1
(Malta) Birkirkara	0

Tournament 3

Hosted by Osijek.

Semi-finals
18 August
(Belgium) Anderlecht	3
(Armenia) Hayasa	0
18 August
(Croatia) Osijek	5
(Montenegro) Breznica Pljevlja	0

Final
21 August
(Belgium) Anderlecht	0
(Croatia) Osijek	1
Third place
21 August
(Montenegro) Breznica Pljevlja	3
(Armenia) Hayasa	2

Tournament 4

Hosted by SFK 2000.

Semi-finals
18 August
(Portugal) Benfica	4
(Israel) Kiryat Gat	0
18 August
(Bosnia and Herzegovina) SFK 2000	0
(Luxembourg) Racing FC	1

Final
21 August
(Portugal) Benfica	7
(Luxembourg) Racing FC	0
Third place
21 August
(Bosnia and Herzegovina) SFK 2000 (a.e.t.) (p)	1 (4)
(Israel) Kiryat Gat	1 (2)

Tournament 5

Hosted by Åland United.

Semi-finals
18 August
(Switzerland) Servette Chênois	1
(Northern Ireland) Glentoran	0
18 August
(Romania) Olimpia Cluj	0
(Finland) Åland United	4

Final
21 August
(Switzerland) Servette Chênois	1
(Finland) Åland United	0
Third place
21 August
(Romania) Olimpia Cluj	0
(Northern Ireland) Glentoran	2

Tournament 6

Hosted by Apollon Limassol.

Semi-finals
18 August
(Cyprus) Apollon Limassol (a.e.t.)	2
(Belarus) Dinamo-BGU Minsk	0
18 August
(Russia) CSKA Moscow (a.e.t.)	4
(Wales) Swansea City	1

Final
21 August
(Cyprus) Apollon Limassol	2
(Russia) CSKA Moscow	1
Third place
21 August
(Belarus) Dinamo-BGU Minsk	2
(Wales) Swansea City	0

Tournament 7

Hosted by PAOK.

Semi-finals
18 August
(Norway) Vålerenga	5
(Kosovo) Mitrovica	0
18 August
(Greece) PAOK	6
(Moldova) Agarista Anenii Noi	0

Final
21 August
(Norway) Vålerenga	2
(Greece) PAOK	0
Third place
21 August
(Kosovo) Mitrovica	3
(Moldova) Agarista Anenii Noi	0

Tournament 8

Hosted by Juventus.

Semi-finals
18 August
(Austria) St. Pölten	7
(Turkey) Beşiktaş	0
18 August
(Italy) Juventus	12
(North Macedonia) Kamenica Sasa	0

Final
21 August
(Austria) St. Pölten	1
(Italy) Juventus	4
Third place
21 August
(Turkey) Beşiktaş	4
(North Macedonia) Kamenica Sasa	0

Tournament 9

Hosted by Twente.

Semi-finals
18 August
(Netherlands) Twente	9
(Georgia (country)) Tbilisi Nike	0
18 August
(Serbia) Spartak Subotica	5
(Republic of Ireland) Peamount United	2

Final
21 August
(Netherlands) Twente (a.e.t.)	5
(Serbia) Spartak Subotica	3
Third place
21 August
(Republic of Ireland) Peamount United	w/o
(Georgia (country)) Tbilisi Nike

The third place play-off between Peamount United and Tbilisi Nike was cancelled following a decision taken by the Dutch health authorities to put the whole team of Tbilisi Nike into quarantine after a player had tested positive for COVID-19. The result of the match was awarded by UEFA as a walkover for Peamount United.

Tournament 10

Hosted by Pomurje.

Semi-finals
18 August
(Ukraine) Zhytlobud-1 Kharkiv	5
(Bulgaria) NSA Sofia	1
18 August
(Slovenia) Pomurje	6
(Latvia) Rīgas FS	1

Final
21 August
(Ukraine) Zhytlobud-1 Kharkiv	4
(Slovenia) Pomurje	1
Third place
21 August
(Bulgaria) NSA Sofia	2
(Latvia) Rīgas FS	1

Tournament 11

Hosted by Czarni Sosnowiec.

Semi-finals
17 August
(Hungary) Ferencváros	2
(Poland) Czarni Sosnowiec	1

Final
20 August
(Albania) Vllaznia (a.e.t.) (p)	0 (3)
(Hungary) Ferencváros	0 (1)

==== League Path ====
Tournament 1

Hosted by Zürich.

Semi-finals
17 August
(Germany) 1899 Hoffenheim	1
(Iceland) Valur	0
17 August
(Switzerland) Zürich	1
(Italy) Milan	2

Final
20 August
(Germany) 1899 Hoffenheim	2
(Italy) Milan	0
Third place
20 August
(Switzerland) Zürich	1
(Iceland) Valur	3

Tournament 2

Hosted by Kristianstad.

Semi-finals
18 August
(France) Bordeaux	2
(Czech Republic) Slovácko	1
18 August
(Denmark) Brøndby	0
(Sweden) Kristianstad	1

Final
21 August
(France) Bordeaux	3
(Sweden) Kristianstad	1
Third place
21 August
(Denmark) Brøndby	2
(Czech Republic) Slovácko	1

Tournament 3

Hosted by Rosenborg.

Semi-finals
18 August
(Spain) Levante	2
(Scotland) Celtic	1
18 August
(Belarus) FC Minsk	1
(Norway) Rosenborg	2

Final
21 August
(Spain) Levante (a.e.t.)	4
(Norway) Rosenborg	3
Third place
21 August
(Belarus) FC Minsk (a.e.t.)	3
(Scotland) Celtic	2

Tournament 4

Hosted by Lokomotiv Moscow.

Semi-finals
18 August
(England) Arsenal	4
(Kazakhstan) Okzhetpes	0
18 August
(Netherlands) PSV	3
(Russia) Lokomotiv Moscow	1

Final
21 August
(England) Arsenal	3
(Netherlands) PSV	1
Third place
21 August
(Kazakhstan) Okzhetpes	0
(Russia) Lokomotiv Moscow	4

=== Round 2 ===
The draw for Round 2 was held on 22 August 2021, 13:00 CEST. The first legs were played on 31 August and 1 September, and the second legs on 8 and 9 September 2021.

The winners of the ties will advance to the group stage.

Champions Path
Team 1	Agg.	Team 2	1st leg	2nd leg
Sparta Prague (Czech Republic)	0–3	(Denmark) HB Køge	0–1	0–2
Osijek (Croatia)	1–4	(Iceland) Breiðablik	1–1	0–3
Vllaznia (Albania)	0–3	(Italy) Juventus	0–2	0–1
Twente (Netherlands)	1–5	(Portugal) Benfica	1–1	0–4
Apollon Limassol (Cyprus)	2–5	(Ukraine) Zhytlobud-1 Kharkiv	1–2	1–3
Servette Chênois (Switzerland)	3–2	(Scotland) Glasgow City	1–1	2–1
Vålerenga (Norway)	3–6	(Sweden) BK Häcken	1–3	2–3

League Path
Team 1	Agg.	Team 2	1st leg	2nd leg
Levante (Spain)	2–4	(France) Lyon	1–2	1–2
Arsenal (England)	7–0	(Czech Republic) Slavia Prague	3–0	4–0
Real Madrid (Spain)	2–1	(England) Manchester City	1–1	1–0
VfL Wolfsburg (Germany)	5–5 (3–0 p)	(France) Bordeaux	3–2	2–3 (a.e.t.)
Rosengård (Sweden)	3–6	(Germany) 1899 Hoffenheim	0–3	3–3

== Group stage ==
Location of teams of the 2021–22 UEFA Women's Champions League group stage.
Brown: Group A; Red: Group B; Orange: Group C; Yellow: Group D.

The draw for the group stage was held on 13 September 2021, 13:00 CEST, in Nyon. The 16 teams were drawn into four groups of four. For the draw, the teams were seeded into four pots, each of four teams, based on the following principles:

- Pot 1 contained the four direct entrants, i.e., the Champions League holders and the champions of the top three associations based on their 2020 UEFA women's country coefficients.
- Pot 2, 3 and 4 contained the remaining teams, seeded based on their 2021 UEFA women's club coefficients.

Teams from the same association could not be drawn into the same group. Prior to the draw, UEFA formed one pairing of teams for associations with two or three teams based on television audiences, where one team was drawn into Groups A–B and another team into Groups C–D, so that the two teams played on different days. Clubs from countries with severe winter conditions (Sweden, Iceland) were assigned a position in their group which allowed them to play away on matchday 6.

The matches were played on 5–6 October, 13–14 October, 9–10 November, 17–18 November, 8–9 December, and 15–16 December 2021. The top two teams of each group advanced to the quarter-finals.

HB Køge, 1899 Hoffenheim and Real Madrid made their debut appearances in European women's football.

=== Group A ===
Pos	Team	Pld	W	D	L	GF	GA	GD	Pts	Qualification	WOL	JUV	CHE	SER
1	(Germany) VfL Wolfsburg	6	3	2	1	17	7	+10	11 (Note: Head-to-head points: Wolfsburg 5, Juventus 5, Chelsea 5. Head-to-head goal differences: Wolfsburg +2, Juventus +1, Chelsea −3.)	Advance to Quarter-finals	—	0–2	4–0	5–0
2	(Italy) Juventus	6	3	2	1	12	4	+8	11	Advance to Quarter-finals	2–2	—	1–2	4–0
3	(England) Chelsea	6	3	2	1	13	8	+5	11		3–3	0–0	—	1–0
4	(Switzerland) Servette Chênois	6	0	0	6	0	23	−23	0		0–3	0–3	0–7	—

Source: UEFA
Rules for classification: Group stage tiebreakers

=== Group B ===
Pos	Team	Pld	W	D	L	GF	GA	GD	Pts	Qualification	PSG	RMA	KHA	BRE
1	(France) Paris Saint-Germain	6	6	0	0	25	0	+25	18	Advance to Quarter-finals	—	4–0	5–0	6–0
2	(Spain) Real Madrid	6	4	0	2	12	6	+6	12	Advance to Quarter-finals	0–2	—	3–0	5–0
3	(Ukraine) Zhytlobud-1 Kharkiv	6	1	1	4	2	15	−13	4		0–6	0–1	—	0–0
4	(Iceland) Breiðablik	6	0	1	5	0	18	−18	1		0–2	0–3	0–2	—

Source: UEFA
Rules for classification: Group stage tiebreakers

=== Group C ===
Pos	Team	Pld	W	D	L	GF	GA	GD	Pts	Qualification	BAR	ARS	HOF	KOG
1	(Spain) Barcelona	6	6	0	0	24	1	+23	18	Advance to Quarter-finals	—	4–1	4–0	5–0
2	(England) Arsenal	6	3	0	3	14	13	+1	9 (Note: Head-to-head points: Arsenal 3, 1899 Hoffenheim 3. Head-to-head goal differences: Arsenal +1, 1899 Hoffenheim −1.)	Advance to Quarter-finals	0–4	—	4–0	3–0
3	(Germany) 1899 Hoffenheim	6	3	0	3	11	15	−4	9		0–5	4–1	—	5–0
4	(Denmark) HB Køge	6	0	0	6	2	22	−20	0		0–2	1–5	1–2	—

Source: UEFA
Rules for classification: Group stage tiebreakers

=== Group D ===
Pos	Team	Pld	W	D	L	GF	GA	GD	Pts	Qualification	LYO	BAY	BEN	HAK
1	(France) Lyon	6	5	0	1	19	2	+17	15	Advance to Quarter-finals	—	2–1	5–0	4–0
2	(Germany) Bayern Munich	6	4	1	1	15	3	+12	13	Advance to Quarter-finals	1–0	—	4–0	4–0
3	(Portugal) Benfica	6	1	1	4	2	16	−14	4		0–5	0–0	—	0–1
4	(Sweden) BK Häcken	6	1	0	5	3	18	−15	3		0–3	1–5	1–2	—

Source: UEFA
Rules for classification: Group stage tiebreakers

== Knockout phase ==
In the knockout phase, teams played against each other over two legs on a home-and-away basis, except for the one-match final. The mechanism of the draws for each round was as follows:

- In the draw for the quarter-finals, the four group winners were seeded, and the four group runners-up were unseeded. The seeded teams were drawn against the unseeded teams, with the seeded teams hosting the second leg. Teams from the same group could not be drawn against each other.
- A draw was also held to determine which semi-final winner was designated as the "home" team for the final (for administrative purposes as it was played at a neutral venue).

=== Bracket ===
Quarter-finals
(Spain) Real Madrid	1	2	3
(Spain) Barcelona	3	5	8
(England) Arsenal	1	0	1
(Germany) VfL Wolfsburg	1	2	3
(Italy) Juventus	2	1	3
(France) Lyon	1	3	4
(Germany) Bayern Munich	1	2	3
(France) Paris Saint-Germain	2	2	4

Semi-finals
(Spain) Barcelona	5	0	5
(Germany) VfL Wolfsburg	1	2	3
(France) Lyon	3	2	5
(France) Paris Saint-Germain	2	1	3

Final
21 May – Turin
(Spain) Barcelona	1
(France) Lyon	3

=== Quarter-finals ===
The draw for the quarter-finals was held on 20 December 2021. The first legs were played on 22 and 23 March, and the second legs on 30 and 31 March 2022.

Team 1	Agg.	Team 2	1st leg	2nd leg
Bayern Munich (Germany)	3–4	(France) Paris Saint-Germain	1–2	2–2 (a.e.t.)
Juventus (Italy)	3–4	(France) Lyon	2–1	1–3
Arsenal (England)	1–3	(Germany) VfL Wolfsburg	1–1	0–2
Real Madrid (Spain)	3–8	(Spain) Barcelona	1–3	2–5

=== Semi-finals ===
The draw for the semi-finals was held on 20 December 2021 (after the quarter-final draw). The first legs were played from 22 and 24 April and the second legs on 30 April 2022. Barcelona's home quarter- and semi-finals (91,553 and 91,648) were the largest known attendances for official women's football since the 1971 Women's World Cup (non-official), where Mexico–Denmark drew 110,000 spectators at the Estadio Azteca in Mexico.

Team 1	Agg.	Team 2	1st leg	2nd leg
Barcelona (Spain)	5–3	(Germany) VfL Wolfsburg	5–1	0–2
Lyon (France)	5–3	(France) Paris Saint-Germain	3–2	2–1

=== Final ===
The final was played on 21 May 2022 at Juventus Stadium, Turin. A draw was held on 20 December 2021, (after the quarter-final and semi-final draws), to determine which semi-final winner would be designated as the "home" team for administrative purposes.

21 May 2022
19:00 UTC+2

Barcelona (Spain)	1–3	(France) Lyon
Putellas 41'	Report	Henry 6'; Hegerberg 23'; Macario 33'

Juventus Stadium, Turin
Attendance: 32,257
Referee: Lina Lehtovaara (Finland)

== Statistics ==
Statistics exclude qualifying rounds and play-off round.

=== Top goalscorers ===
Rank	Player	Team	Goals
1	(Spain) Alexia Putellas	(Spain) Barcelona	11
2	(Germany) Tabea Waßmuth	(Germany) VfL Wolfsburg	10
3	(United States) Catarina Macario	(France) Lyon	8
4	(France) Marie-Antoinette Katoto	(France) Paris Saint-Germain	7
5	(Norway) Ada Hegerberg	(France) Lyon	6
5	(Canada) Jordyn Huitema	(France) Paris Saint-Germain	6
7	(Italy) Cristiana Girelli	(Italy) Juventus	5
7	(Spain) Jennifer Hermoso	(Spain) Barcelona	5
7	(Netherlands) Jill Roord	(Germany) VfL Wolfsburg	5
10	(Switzerland) Ramona Bachmann	(France) Paris Saint-Germain	4
10	(Spain) Aitana Bonmatí	(Spain) Barcelona	4
10	(Australia) Sam Kerr	(England) Chelsea	4
10	(Germany) Lea Schüller	(Germany) Bayern Munich	4

=== Team of the season ===
The UEFA technical study group selected the following players as the team of the tournament.

Pos.	Player	Team
GK	(Chile) Christiane Endler	(France) Lyon
DF	(France) Griedge Mbock Bathy	(France) Lyon
DF	(France) Wendie Renard	(France) Lyon
DF	(Spain) Mapi León	(Spain) Barcelona
DF	(France) Selma Bacha	(France) Lyon
MF	(Spain) Aitana Bonmatí	(Spain) Barcelona
MF	(Spain) Patricia Guijarro	(Spain) Barcelona
MF	(France) Amandine Henry	(France) Lyon
MF	(Spain) Alexia Putellas	(Spain) Barcelona
FW	(Norway) Ada Hegerberg	(France) Lyon
FW	(France) Marie-Antoinette Katoto	(France) Paris Saint-Germain

=== Player of the season ===
- (Spain) Alexia Putellas ( (Spain) Barcelona)

=== Young player of the season ===
- (France) Selma Bacha ( (France) Lyon)

== See also ==
- 2021–22 UEFA Champions League
