= 2010–11 Slovak Women's First League =

The 2010–11 Slovak Women's First League was the 17th edition of the premier category for women's football clubs in Slovakia, running between 28 August 2010 and 7 May 2011. Ten teams took part in the competition, with newly promoted Ajax Pakostov and Topvar Topolcany joining SK Juventus Zilina, Lady Team Bratislava, SK Selce, TJ Skloplast Trnava, Slovan Bratislava, Slovan Duslo Sala, Slovan Trencianske Teplice and SK Stich Humenné.

Defending champion Slovan Bratislava won its tenth championship and the third one in a row, qualifying for the 2011-12 Champions League, while Slovan Duslo Sala was again the runner-up one point behind and Topvar Topolcany was third in its debut. SK Selce was relegated as the bottom team, and third-to-last Skloplast Trnava also lost the category.

== Table ==
PS	Pos	Team	Pld	W	D	L	GF	GA	GD	Pts
Same position	1	Slovan Bratislava	18	16	1	1	85	7	+78	49
Same position	2	Slovan Duslo Sala	18	16	0	2	73	7	+66	48
New entry	3	Topvar Topolcany	18	13	0	5	72	23	+49	39
▼1	4	Juventus Zilina	18	12	0	6	65	25	+40	36
Same position	5	Stich Humenné	18	9	2	7	30	33	-3	29
▼2	6	Slovan Trencianske Teplice	18	8	0	10	39	50	-11	24
New entry	7	Ajax Pakostov	18	4	3	11	19	56	-37	15
▲1	8	Skloplast Trnava	18	4	2	12	16	64	-48	14
▼2	9	Lady Team Bratislava	18	2	1	15	10	72	-62	7
▼2	10	Selce	18	1	1	16	8	80	-72	4

== Results ==
2010–11	SLB	SDS	TOP	JUZ	HUM	STT	AJP	TRN	LTB	SEL
Slovan Bratislava		2–0	2–0	8–0	3–0	6–0	3–0	8–1	5–1	7–0
Slovan Duslo Sala	0–2		4–0	2–0	5–0	6–0	5–0	12–0	6–0	3–0
Topvar Topolcany	0–3	0–1		4–3	7–0	5–2	10–0	8–0	6–1	7–0
Juventus Zilina	1–0	1–2	0–2		3–0	6–0	6–1	4–0	4–1	13–0
Stich Humenné	0–0	0–4	1–2	3–0		6–3	3–1	1–0	4–0	3–0
Slovan Trencianske Teplice	2–4	0–4	1–4	1–4	3–0		4–0	3–0	6–0	3–2
Ajax Pakostov	1–3	1–7	3–0	1–6	0–4	1–0		1–1	3–0	4–1
Skloplast Trnava	1–7	1–5	2–6	0–1	1–1	0–3	2–1		3–1	1–0
Lady Team Bratislava	0–10	0–4	0–3	0–6	1–3	0–4	1–1	2–1		2–0
Selce	0–12	0–3	0–8	0–7	0–1	2–4	0–0	0–2	3–0	
