= Partizán Bardejov (women) =

- Full name: Partizán Bardejov
- Founded: 2012
- Dissolved: 2021
- Ground: Mestský štadión Bardejov, Bardejov
- Capacity: 3,435
- Chairman: Jozef Mihok
- Manager: Igor Djokić
- League: 1. slovenská futbalová liga žien
- 2024–25: 1st in Second League (promoted)
- Website: http://partizanbj.sk/muzstva/zeny/
Home colours	Away colours

Partizán Bardejov Ženy is a women's football team representing Partizán Bardejov. The club did not enter any league for the 2021–22 season due to financial problems.

== Honours ==
=== Record in UEFA competitions ===
Season	Competition	Stage	Result	Opponent	Group	Place	Qual.
2017–18	Champions League	Qualifying Stage	0–4	(Lithuania) Gintra Universitetas	Group 1	3rd place	
2017–18	Champions League	Qualifying Stage	1–5	(Turkey) Konak Belediyespor	Group 1	3rd place	
2017–18	Champions League	Qualifying Stage	3–0	(Georgia (country)) Martve	Group 1	3rd place	

=== League and Cup history ===
Season	Division (Name)	Pos./Teams	Pl.	W	D	L	GS	GA	P	Slovak Women's Cup
2013–14	2nd (II. liga žien)	1/(10)	16	12	3	1	64	7	39	1.R
2014–15	1st (Slovak Women's First League)	2/(9)	16	11	3	2	62	9	36	Quarter-finals
2015–16	1st (Slovak Women's First League)	2/(9)	16	11	3	2	41	19	36	Winner
2016–17	1st (Slovak Women's First League)	1/(10)	18	15	2	1	58	14	47	Winner
2017–18	1st (Slovak Women's First League)	2/(10)	18	17	0	1	71	11	51	Runners-up
2018–19	1st (Slovak Women's First League)	2/(10)	18	16	1	1	67	6	49	Winner
2019–20	1st (Slovak Women's First League)	2/(10)	9	7	2	0	35	3	23	Abandoned
2020–21	1st (Slovak Women's First League)	2/(10)	5	5	0	0	24	0	15	Abandoned

Notes

Seasons were abandoned due to the COVID-19 pandemic in Slovakia.
