= FC Spartak Trnava Women =

Slovak women's football club

- Full name: FC Spartak Trnava ženy
- Founded: July 1, 2014; 11 years ago
- Stadium: Anton Malatinský Stadium
- Capacity: 18,159
- League: Slovak Women's First League

FC Spartak Trnava Women (Slovak: FC Spartak Trnava ženy) is a Slovak professional women's football club based in Trnava, Slovakia. The club plays in the Slovak Women's First League, the top tier of Slovak women’s football. The women started playing for Spartak after transferring from TJ Skloplast Trnava in 2014. The club started in the 2nd league and has been playing in the first women's league since the 2018/19 season. Spartak Trnava Women also have multiple youth categories in their academy.

== History ==
=== Founding ===
Women's football in Trnava has a history that dates back to 1968. Initially known as Skloplast Trnava until June 2014, the team experienced significant developments following UEFA regulations introduced that year. The UEFA rule mandated that men's football clubs competing in European tournaments must also develop and support women's teams. Consequently, the clubs merged their brands, and the female players were re-registered under the name FC Spartak Trnava ženy.

=== 1973–1990: Golden years ===
The women's team experienced a golden era alongside the men's team. From their inception, they improved each season, winning their first Slovak championship title in the 1973/74 season. They went on to win seven consecutive Slovak titles during this period. Internationally, Spartak Trnava ženy also made a notable impact. They attracted large crowds, including 10,000 spectators during key matches, where they defeated Wisła Kraków 4–0 and the Yugoslav champions Železničar Subotica 4–2. They later went on to compete in the "O srdce Mladého světa" tournament, an unofficial competition of Czechoslovakia They finished third in 1973 and 1974, behind leading Czech teams, and reached the final in 1980, narrowly losing in a penalty shootout. Anna Belková was named the best player of the tournament in 1973, and in 1974, Blanka Paukovičová received the same honor. That year, Katka Némethová also earned recognition as the tournament’s top scorer.

The Trnava women’s team continued to achieve strong results throughout the 1980s, winning five additional league titles in the 1983/84, 1985/86, 1987/88, 1988/89, and 1989/90 seasons. During this period, they also won the Slovak Cup five times. The team gained recognition abroad as well. In 1983, they won a tournament in Sosnowiec, Poland, finishing in first place. Three years later, they achieved their best international result in Wassenaar, Netherlands, where they defeated teams such as FC Den Haag and Finnish club Turun Kyrkivä. Toward the end of the decade, the team competed for the Czechoslovak championship title. In 1989 and 1990, they narrowly missed out, losing to Sparta ČKD Praha, 4–1 on penalties after a 1–1 draw, and then 2–1 in the subsequent match.

=== 1989–2011: Decline of the club ===
After the Velvet Revolution, changes in the political and economic system affected the team. Due to financial constraints, they no longer traveled to international tournaments despite invitations, and the squad was replaced by a younger generation, which resulted in lower league positions. Increasing financial difficulties led Skloplast Trnava to withdraw from the top league in 2011. In the following season, they competed in the second league.

=== 2014–present: Reorganization ===
Since 2014, women's football in Trnava has been organized under the name, FC Spartak Trnava ženy. After their first season, the club's youth base expanded significantly, leading to the formation of a women's B team composed of junior players. At that time, both the A and B teams competed in the second league, but since the 2017/2018 season, the A team has been a regular participant in the top division. In July 2024, the club celebrated its 10th year since its reorganization. In September 2024, the women’s team played a math in the Anton Malatinský Stadium for the first time, where they defeated Žilina 1–0 in front of 570 spectators.

== See also ==
- List of women's football clubs in Slovakia
