= Spartak Myjava (women) =

- Full name: Spartak Myjava a.s.
- Nickname: Kopaničiarky
- Founded: 1920 (club); 2009 (women's team)
- Stadium: Stadium Myjava, Myjava
- Capacity: 2709
- Coach: Iveta Neveďalová
- League: 1. league
Home colours	Away colours	Third colours

Spartak Myjava (Slovak pronunciation: (Slovak pronunciation: [ˈspartak ˈmijaʋa]) is a Slovak women's football club, based in the town of Myjava. They are the women's team of Spartak Myjava, which was founded in 1920, but the women's team was introduced in 2009.

They won the Slovak Women's First League five times in row between 2022 and 2026, and the Slovak Women's Cup four times.

== Honours ==
- Slovak Women's First League
  - Winners : 2021–22, 2022–23, 2023–24, 2024–25, 2025–26
- Slovak Women's Second League
  - Winners: 2014–15
- Slovak Women's Cup
  - Winners: 2023, 2024, 2025, 2026

== Current squad ==
As of 19 June 2026

Note: Flags indicate national team as defined under FIFA eligibility rules; some limited exceptions apply. Players may hold more than one non-FIFA nationality.

No.	Pos.	Nation	Player
25	GK	SVK	Viktória Opalková
33	GK	SVK	Sofia Dupkalová
4	DF	SVK	Sára Kršiaková
5	DF	SRB	Maja Dimitrijević
7	DF	SVK	Nina Matušicová
21	DF	SVK	Vanesa Vojsová
30	DF	SVK	Zuzana Nina Nárožná
—	DF	SVK	Monika Pirťanová
—	DF	SVK	Adela Jankechová
16	MF	SVK	Lívia Letková
—	MF	SVK	Rebeca Kissová
8	MF	CZE	Eliška Dvořáková

No.	Pos.	Nation	Player
22	MF	CZE	Barbora Marholtová
—	MF	SVK	Iveta Neveďalová
18	MF	SVK	Sofia Záhorcová
20	MF	SVK	Tamara Kramlíková
77	MF	SVK	Lívia Múčková
—	MF	CZE	Sára Korvasová
—	MF	SVK	Diana Durišová
11	FW	SVK	Katarína Vredíková
12	FW	SVK	Radoslava Jacenková
9	FW	SVK	Andrea Bogorová
6	FW	SVK	Barbora Vargová
