= FK Slovan Duslo Šaľa (women) =

Slovan Šaľa
- Full name: FK Slovan Duslo Šaľa
- Nickname: Chemičky (the Chemists)
- Founded: 1921
- Dissolved: 2018
- Ground: Šaľa Stadium
- Capacity: 1,126
Home colours	Away colours

FK Slovan Duslo Šaľa was a Slovak woman’s football club that last played in the second division. The club worked together with FK Slovan Duslo Šaľa, the men’s sector. The club was dissolved in 2018.

== History ==
In the seasons 2005-06, 2006-07, and 2007-08 season, the club won the top division of the Slovak women’s league three times in a row.

Its women's team won four national championships in a row between 2005 and 2008, consequently representing Slovakia in the European Cup. Most recently it was the runner-up in 2011, just one point behind Slovan Bratislava.

== Honours ==
- Women
  - Slovak League
    - 2005, 2006, 2007, 2008
  - Slovak Cup
    - 2010

=== Record in UEFA competitions ===
Season	Competition	Stage	Result	Opponent
2006–07	European Cup	Qualifying Stage	1–0	(Romania) Clujana
2006–07	European Cup	Qualifying Stage	2–5	(Kazakhstan) Alma
2006–07	European Cup	Qualifying Stage	1–6	(Russia) Rossiyanka
2007–08	European Cup	Qualifying Stage	0–12	(France) Olympique Lyon
2007–08	European Cup	Qualifying Stage	0–2	(Bosnia and Herzegovina) Sarajevo
2007–08	European Cup	Qualifying Stage	1–3	(North Macedonia) Skiponjat
2008–09	European Cup	Qualifying Stage	1–1	(Israel) Maccabi Holon
2008–09	European Cup	Qualifying Stage	2–6	(Iceland) Valur
2008–09	European Cup	Qualifying Stage	0–0	(Wales) Cardiff City
