= FK Union Nové Zámky =

Slovakian football club

Nové Zámky
- Full name: FK Union Nové Zámky
- Founded: 2002
- Website: https://fcunion.sk/
Home colours	Away colours	Third colours

FK Union Nové Zámky is a women's football team from Nové Zámky, Slovakia, playing in the Slovak Women's Second League. The team has won the championship in 2013, 2014 and 2015 and won the Slovak Cup in 2014 and 2015.

== History ==
The team was founded in April 2002.

After losing the 2013 cup final, they won the national cup in 2014 after 28 penalty kicks. They then completed the double, when they defended their league title in 2014.

== Honours ==
- Slovak Women's First League
  - Winner: 2012–13, 2013–14, 2014–15
- Slovak Women's Second League
  - Winner: 2018–19
- Slovak Women's Cup
  - Winner: 2014, 2015
  - Runner-up: 2013

=== Record in UEFA competitions ===
Season	Competition	Stage	Result	Opponent
2013–14	Champions League	Qualifying Stage	0–2	(Cyprus) Apollon Limassol
2013–14	Champions League	Qualifying Stage	0–0	(Israel) ASA Tel Aviv
2013–14	Champions League	Qualifying Stage	6–0	(Moldova) Goliador Chişinău
2014–15	Champions League	Qualifying Stage	0–5	(Scotland) Glasgow City
2014–15	Champions League	Qualifying Stage	1–3	(Ukraine) Zhytlobud Kharkiv
2014–15	Champions League	Qualifying Stage	2–5	(Northern Ireland) Belfast United
2015–16	Champions League	Qualifying Stage	0–9	(Finland) PK-35 Vantaa
2015–16	Champions League	Qualifying Stage	0–5	(Ukraine) Zhytlobud Kharkiv
2015–16	Champions League	Qualifying Stage	2–3	(Latvia) Rīgas FS
