= Slovak Women's First League =

Top women's soccer league in Slovakia

- Founded: 1994
- Country: Slovakia
- Confederation: UEFA
- Divisions: 1
- Number of clubs: 10
- Level on pyramid: 1
- Relegation to: II. liga žien
- Domestic cup: Slovak Women's Cup
- International cup: UEFA Champions League
- Current champions: Spartak Myjava (5th title) (2025–26)
- Most championships: Slovan Bratislava (14 titles)
- Top scorer: Andrea Bogorová (266 Goals) (21 November 2026)
- Website: Official website
- Current: 2026–27

The I. liga žien (Slovak for "First Women's League") is the top level women's football league of Slovakia.

The winner of the league qualifies for the UEFA Women's Champions League.

There are currently ten teams in the league.

== History ==
The Czechoslovak women's football championships were divided between the country's two "federal republics", but the Czech and Slovak champions did meet in an annual final match from the season 1988–89 until 1992–93.

The Slovak Women's First League was founded in 1994.

== Format ==
In 2011/12 the format of the league was changed. The ten teams first play a double round-robin for 18 matches per team. After that a championship group was introduced. The top four teams will play each other twice again. The winner of the group then is the champion. The last place of the regular season gets relegated.

== 2024/25 teams ==
- Slovan Bratislava
- Partizán Bardejov
- MŠK Žilina
- Spartak Myjava
- FC Petržalka
- FC Spartak Trnava
- AS Trenčín
- MFK Ružomberok
- GFC Topoľcany
- Tatran Prešov

== List of champions ==
List of champions:

- 1993–94: HAKU Bratislava
- 1994–95: Slovan Bratislava
- 1995–96: Slovan Bratislava
- 1996–97: Slovan Bratislava
- 1997–98: Slovan Bratislava
- 1998–99: Slovan Bratislava
- 1999–2000: ŠKF VIX Žilina
- 2000–01: Slovan Bratislava
- 2001–02: ZSNP Žiar nad Hronom
- 2002–03: ZSNP Žiar nad Hronom
- 2003–04: Slovan Bratislava
- 2004–05: Slovan Šaľa
- 2005–06: Slovan Šaľa
- 2006–07: Slovan Šaľa
- 2007–08: Slovan Šaľa
- 2008–09: Slovan Bratislava
- 2009–10: Slovan Bratislava
- 2010–11: Slovan Bratislava
- 2011–12: Slovan Bratislava
- 2012–13: Nové Zámky
- 2013–14: Nové Zámky
- 2014–15: Nové Zámky
- 2015–16: Slovan Bratislava
- 2016–17: Partizán Bardejov
- 2017–18: Slovan Bratislava
- 2018–19: Slovan Bratislava
- 2019–20: abandoned due to COVID-19 pandemic
- 2020–21: abandoned due to COVID-19 pandemic
- 2021–22: Spartak Myjava
- 2022–23: Spartak Myjava
- 2023–24: Spartak Myjava
- 2024–25: Spartak Myjava
- 2025–26: Spartak Myjava
