= Slovak Women's Cup =

Slovenský pohár žien
- Founded: 2009
- Region: Slovakia
- Current champions: Slovan Bratislava (6th title)
- Most championships: Slovan Bratislava (6 titles)
- Website: Official website
- 2021–22

The Slovak Women's Cup is the annual cup competition of women's football teams in Slovakia. It was established in 2009.

== List of finals ==
The list of finals so far:

Season	Champion	Result	Runner-up
2009	Slovan Bratislava	1–1 (3–2 pen.)	Slovan Duslo Šaľa
2010	Slovan Duslo Šaľa	1–1^{A} (3–0 pen.)	Slovan Bratislava
2011	Slovan Bratislava	5–0	MFK Topvar Topoľčany
2012	Slovan Bratislava	2–0	Slovan Duslo Šaľa
2013	Slovan Bratislava	2–1	Nové Zámky
2014	Nové Zámky	0–0^{A} (10–9 pen.)	Slovan Bratislava
2015	Nové Zámky	3–2	Slovan Bratislava
2016	Partizán Bardejov	2–1	Slovan Bratislava
2017	Partizán Bardejov	1–1 (4–1 pen)	Slovan Bratislava
2018	Slovan Bratislava	2–0	Partizán Bardejov
2019	Partizán Bardejov	1–0	Slovan Bratislava
2020		Cancelled	
2021		Cancelled	
2022	Slovan Bratislava	1–0	MŠK Žilina

A No extra time played.

== See also ==
- Slovak Cup, men's cup
