= ŠK Slovan Bratislava (women) =

Women's football club in Slovakia

Slovan Bratislava (women)
- Full name: ŠK Slovan Bratislava Bratislava futbal, a.s.
- Nickname: Belasí (Sky blues)
- Ground: Štadión Tehelné pole;
- Capacity: 22,500
- Chairman: Ivan Kmotrík
- Manager: Erik Havrila
- League: First League
- 2024–25: 2nd
- Website: https://www.skslovan.com/timy/?hrac=supiska.ZENY
Home colours	Away colours	Third colours

ŠK Slovan Bratislava Ženy is a women's football team in the Slovak Women's First League, representing ŠK Slovan Bratislava. It has won the league 15 times, including the two last ones as of 2021.

Slovan have also won the women's League–Cup double in the seasons 2009, 2011, 2012 and 2018.

== Honours ==
- Slovak Women's First League
  - Champions (14): 1995 to 1999, 2001, 2004, 2009 to 2012, 2016, 2018, 2019
- Slovak Women's Cup
  - Winners (6): 2009, 2011, 2012, 2013, 2018, 2022
  - Runners-up (6): 2010, 2014, 2015, 2016, 2017, 2019

=== Record in UEFA competitions ===
Season	Competition	Stage	Result	Opponent
2010–11	Champions League	Qualifying Stage	0–3	(Germany) FCR Duisburg
			0–4	(Scotland) Glasgow City
			1–0	(Northern Ireland) Crusaders NS
2011–12	Champions League	Qualifying Stage	1–0	(Poland) Unia Racibórz
			0–1	(Finland) PK-35 Vantaa
			16–0	(Albania) Ada Velipojë
2012–13	Champions League	Qualifying Stage	0–5	(Poland) Unia Racibórz
			3–2	(Belarus) Bobruichanka
			0–8	(Montenegro) Ekonomist
2020–21	Champions League	1st Qualifying Stage	0–4	(Lithuania) Gintra Universitetas

== Current squad ==
As of 2 September 2024

Note: Flags indicate national team as defined under FIFA eligibility rules; some limited exceptions apply. Players may hold more than one non-FIFA nationality.

No.	Pos.	Nation	Player
2	DF	SVK	Laura Harustakova
5	DF	SVK	Eve Pálkova
6	FW	SVK	Viktória Ščasnárová
7	DF	SVK	Diana Mičenková
8	DF	SVK	Simon Vacula
10	FW	SVK	Lucia Droppova
11	MF	SVK	Tamara Nanova
12	DF	SVK	Michael Mashurova
15	FW	SVK	Dominica Gondova
17	MF	SVK	Kristina Bartošová

No.	Pos.	Nation	Player
17	FW	SVK	Natalia Botkova
18	FW	SVK	Lola Gibejová
19	DF	SVK	Dominica Blažeková
20	MF	SVK	Nina Nedoroščíková
21	MF	SVK	Alexandra Tejová
27	MF	SVK	Klara Krajčiová
33	GK	SVK	Ivana Sorbyová
—	GK	SVK	Bibiana Legíňová
—	FW	SVK	Linda Hlavinková
—	MF	SVK	Terezia Soltysova
—	MF	SVK	Julianna Pivarčiová
—	MF	SVK	Michaela Martišková
