= Ukrainian football clubs in European competitions =

Ukrainian football clubs have participated in European football competitions since 1965, when in the 1965–66 season, Dynamo Kyiv took part in the UEFA Cup Winners' Cup – the first Ukrainian and the first Soviet club to do so. In total, 17 clubs have represented Ukraine in European competition, among which 7 also previously represented the Soviet Union.

== History ==
Dynamo Kyiv made a bold entry in the continental competitions back in 1965–66 as holders of the 1964 Soviet Cup. Since that time, Dynamo has missed only 5 seasons.

Until 1993, Ukrainian clubs represented the Soviet Union. Upon dissolution of the Soviet Union all their points were passed on to the Russian football federation clubs, boosting the Russian coefficient and placing Russia among the best ranking federations in Europe, while Ukrainian federation clubs started from scratch.

As part of the Soviet Union, Dynamo Kyiv participated in 24 various competitions, playing over a hundred games and winning three trophies. Its star player Oleg Blokhin became one of the most recognized players not for the Kyiv club, but for the whole of Soviet football.

Besides Dynamo, Soviet football was also represented by six other clubs from Ukraine, among which are Shakhtar Donetsk with five European seasons and Dnipro Dnipropetrovsk with six European seasons.

Since attaining independence, Ukraine has been represented by many new clubs, some of which played in Soviet competition, while others never existed in the Soviet Union.

Dynamo Kyiv (1965), Karpaty Lviv (1970), Zorya Luhansk (1973), Chornomorets Odesa (1975), Shakhtar Donetsk (1977), FC Dnipro (1984), Metalist Kharkiv (1988), Tavriya Simferopol (1992), Nyva Vinnytsia (1996), Vorskla Poltava (1997), CSKA Kyiv (1998), Kryvbas Kryvyi Rih (1999), Metalurh Donetsk (2002), Metalurh Zaporizhya (2002), Illichivets Mariupol (2004), FC Oleksandriya (2016), Olimpik Donetsk (2017), Desna Chernihiv (2020), Kolos Kovalivka (2020), SC Dnipro-1 (2022), Polissya Zhytomyr (2024), LNZ Cherkasy (2026).

=== Ukrainian clubs in Europe during the Soviet period ===
Ukraine was the only other union republic of the Soviet Union besides Russia that also managed to have representation in Europe almost every season, starting with the first participation of Soviet clubs in European club competitions.

- 1965–66 Dynamo Kyiv CWC
- 1966–67 (none)
- 1967–68 Dynamo Kyiv EC
- 1968–69 Dynamo Kyiv EC (boycott)
- 1969–70 Dynamo Kyiv EC
- 1970–71 Karpaty Lviv CWC
- 1971–72 (none)
- 1972–73 Dynamo Kyiv EC
- 1973–74 Zoria Voroshilovhrad EC / Dynamo Kyiv UC
- 1974–75 Dynamo Kyiv CWC
- 1975–76 Dynamo Kyiv EC / Chornomorets Odesa UC
- 1976–77 Dynamo Kyiv EC / Shakhtar Donetsk UC
- 1977–78 Dynamo Kyiv UC
- 1978–79 Dynamo Kyiv EC / Shakhtar Donetsk CWC
- 1979–80 Dynamo Kyiv UC, Shakhtar Donetsk UC
- 1980–81 Dynamo Kyiv UC, Shakhtar Donetsk UC
- 1981–82 Dynamo Kyiv EC
- 1982–83 Dynamo Kyiv EC
- 1983–84 Dynamo Kyiv UC / Shakhtar Donetsk CWC
- 1984–85 Dnipro Dnipropetrovsk EC
- 1985–86 Dnipro Dnipropetrovsk UC, Chornomorets Odesa UC / Dynamo Kyiv CWC
- 1986–87 Dynamo Kyiv EC / Dnipro Dnipropetrovsk UC
- 1987–88 Dynamo Kyiv EC
- 1988–89 Dnipro Dnipropetrovsk UC / Metalist Kharkiv CWC
- 1989–90 Dnipro Dnipropetrovsk EC / Dynamo Kyiv UC
- 1990–91 Dnipro Dnipropetrovsk UC, Chornomorets Odesa UC / Dynamo Kyiv CWC
- 1991–92 Dynamo Kyiv EC

=== Summary ===
The all-time table includes records for the Soviet period as well as the period of independent Ukraine. In bold are shown teams of the latest season.

As of 19 December 2023

S = seasons, GP = games played, W = won, D = drawn, L = lost, GS = goals scored, GA = goals allowed, GD = goals difference, Pts = points, LA = last appearance.

#	Team	Pop. place	S	GP	W	D	L	GS	GA	GD	Pts	LA	Notes
1.	**Dynamo**	Kyiv	54	416	174	102	140	599	490	+109	624	2023–24 UECL	
2.	**Shakhtar***	Donetsk	34	280	123	58	99	425	402	+23	427	2023–24 UEL	
3.	Dnipro†	Dnipro	21	121	53	28	40	167	133	+34	187	2015–16 UEL	
4.	Metalist	Kharkiv	9	64	30	15	19	88	55	+33	105	2014–15 UEL	
5.	**Zorya**	Luhansk	10	60	20	12	28	67	88	–21	72	2023–24 UECL	
6.	Chornomorets	Odesa	11	50	19	12	19	58	54	+4	69	2014–15 UEL	
7.	**Vorskla**	Poltava	11	44	16	8	20	56	68	–12	56	2023–24 UECL	
8.	Metalurh†	Donetsk	7	24	11	6	7	43	37	+6	39	2013–14 UEL	
9.	Karpaty	Lviv	5	22	7	7	8	28	33	–5	28	2011–12 UEL	
10.	Arsenal†	Kyiv	3	12	5	1	6	13	16	–3	16	2012–13 UEL	other names: CSKA
11.	Tavriya†	Simferopol	4	14	4	3	7	11	23	–12	15	2010–11 UEL	
12.	**Dnipro-1**	Dnipro	2	16	3	5	8	16	25	–9	14	2023–24 UECL	
13.	Mariupol†	Mariupol	3	10	3	3	4	9	14	–5	12	2019–20 UEL	other names: Illichivets
14.	Metalurh	Zaporizhzhia	2	8	2	4	2	8	4	+4	10	2006–07 UC	
15.	Oleksandriya	Oleksandriia	3	12	1	5	6	10	19	–9	8	2019–20 UEL	
16.	Kryvbas	Kryvyi Rih	2	6	2	0	4	7	12	–5	6	2000–01 UC	
17.	Kolos	Kovalivka	2	4	1	2	1	2	3	–1	5	2021–22 UECL	
18.	Nyva	Vinnytsia	1	4	1	0	3	2	8	–6	3	1996-97 UCWC	
19.	Olimpik†	Donetsk	1	2	0	1	1	1	3	–2	1	2017–18 UEL	
20.	Desna†	Chernihiv	1	1	0	0	1	0	2	–2	0	2020–21 UEL	
Total				1,170	475	272	423	1,610	1,489	+121	1,697	—	

=== All-time coefficient ===
As of 31 March 2020

#	Team	Pop. place	Coef.	Pts	Seasons		GP	W	D	L	Notes
#	Team	Pop. place	Coef.	Pts	Total	CL/EC	GP	W	D	L	Notes
1.	**Shakhtar**	Donetsk	11.380	284.5	25	20	218	98	45	75	
2.	Dynamo	Kyiv	9.911	277.5	28	25	261	98	71	92	
3.	Metalist	Kharkiv	7.812	62.5	8	1	60	29	14	17	
4.	Dnipro	Dnipro	6.714	94	14	1	93	44	19	30	
5.	Chornomorets	Odesa	4.571	32	7	0	36	14	9	13	
6.	Karpaty	Lviv	3.125	12.5	4	0	20	7	6	7	
7.	Zorya	Luhansk	2.917	17.5	6	0	32	10	9	13	
8.	Vorskla	Poltava	2.571	18	7	0	32	12	4	16	
9.	Metalurh	Zaporizhzhia	2.500	5	2	0	8	2	4	2	
10.	Arsenal	Kyiv	2.333	7	3	0	11	5	1	5	other names: CSKA
11.	Metalurh	Donetsk	2.286	16	7	0	24	11	6	7	
12.	Nyva	Vinnytsia	2.000	2	1	0	4	1	0	3	
13.	Oleksandriya	Oleksandriia	1.667	5	3	0	12	1	5	6	
14.	Tavriya	Simferopol	1.500	3	2	1	6	1	1	4	
14.	Mariupol	Mariupol	1.500	4.5	3	0	10	3	3	4	other names: Illichivets
16.	Kryvbas	Kryvyi Rih	1.000	2	2	0	6	2	0	4	
17.	Olimpik	Donetsk	0.500	0.5	1	0	2	0	1	1	
Total			6.519	843.5	123	48	835	338	198	299	

== Multiple European competition winners from Ukraine ==
Team	Number of Wins	Years
Dynamo Kyiv	3	1975 (2), 1986
Shakhtar Donetsk	1	2009

== European and World competition winners ==
Cup Winners Cup	UEFA Cup/Europa League	Super Cup
1974–75 – Dynamo Kyiv	2008–09 – Shakhtar Donetsk	1975 – Dynamo Kyiv
1985–86 – Dynamo Kyiv

== UEFA Champions League/European Cup ==
Until 1992–93 Ukrainian teams represented the Soviet Union. The Soviet teams did not enter the European Cup competitions until 1966. In 1992 the competition's name has changed to UEFA Champions League.

Notes: Blue border colour indicates seasons for which UEFA coefficient earned by Ukrainian clubs was awarded to Russia.

Year	Team	Progress	Score	Opponents	Venue(s)
1955–56	None entered				
1956–57	None entered				
1957–58	None entered				
1958–59	None entered				
1959–60	None entered				
1960–61	None entered				
1961–62	None entered				
1962–63	None entered				
1963–64	None entered				
1964–65	None entered				
1965–66	None entered				
1966–67	Presented by Russian clubs ( (Russia) Torpedo Moscow)				
1967–68	Dynamo Kyiv	Second round	2–3	(Poland) Górnik Zabrze	1–2 at Kyiv Tsentralny Stadion, 1–1 at Stadion Śląski
1968–69	Soviet boycott (Dynamo Kyiv – (Poland) Ruch Chorzów)				
1969–70	Dynamo Kyiv	Second round	1–2	(Italy) Fiorentina	1–2 at Kyiv Tsentralny Stadion, 0–0 at Florence Stadio Comunale
1970–71	Presented by Russian clubs ( (Russia) Spartak Moscow)				
1971–72	Presented by Russian clubs ( (Russia) CSKA Moscow)				
1972–73	Dynamo Kyiv	Quarter-finals	0–3	(Spain) Real Madrid	0–0 at Tsentralny Stadion ChMP, (Note: Dynamo Kyiv played their home match at Tsentralny Stadion ChMP, Odesa, instead of their regular stadium Kyiv Tsentralny Stadion, Kyiv, due to frozen pitch.); 0–3 at Santiago Bernabéu Stadium
1973–74	Zorya Voroshylovhrad	Second round	0–1	(Czechoslovakia) Spartak Trnava	0–0 at Spartak Stadium, 0–1 at Luhansk Stadion Avanhard
1974–75	Presented by Armenian clubs ( (Armenia) Ararat Yerevan)				
1975–76	Dynamo Kyiv	Quarter-finals	2–3 (a.e.t.)	(France) Saint-Étienne	2–0 at Simferopol Stadion Lokomotyv, (Note: Dynamo Kyiv played their home match at Simferopol Stadion Lokomotyv, Simferopol, instead of their regular stadium Kyiv Tsentralny Stadion, Kyiv, due to weather conditions.); 0–3 (a.e.t.) at Stade Geoffroy-Guichard
1976–77	Dynamo Kyiv	Semi-finals	1–2	(West Germany) Borussia Mönchengladbach	1–0 at Kyiv Tsentralny Stadion, 0–2 at Rheinstadion
1977–78	Presented by Russian clubs ( (Russia) Torpedo Moscow)				
1978–79	Dynamo Kyiv	Second round	0–2	(Sweden) Malmö FF	0–0 at Kharkiv Stadion Metalist, (Note: Dynamo Kyiv played their home matches at Kharkiv Stadion Metalist, Kharkiv, instead of their regular stadium Kyiv Tsentralny Stadion, Kyiv, due to reconstruction in preparation to the 1980 Summer Olympics.); 0–2 at Malmö Stadion
1979–80	Presented by Georgian clubs ( (Georgia (country)) Dinamo Tbilisi)				
1980–81	Presented by Russian clubs ( (Russia) Spartak Moscow)				
1981–82	Dynamo Kyiv	Quarter-finals	0–2	(England) Aston Villa	0–0 at Simferopol Stadion Lokomotyv, 0–2 at Villa Park
1982–83	Dynamo Kyiv	Quarter-finals	2–4	(West Germany) Hamburg	0–3 at Tbilisi Stadion Dinamo imenni Vladimira Lenina, (Note: Dynamo Kyiv played their home match at Tbilisi Stadion Dinamo imenni Vladimira Lenina, Tbilisi, instead of their regular stadium Kyiv Tsentralny Stadion, Kyiv, due to weather conditions.); 2–1 at Volksparkstadion
1983–84	Presented by Belarusian clubs ( (Belarus) Dinamo Minsk)				
1984–85	Dnipro Dnipropetrovsk	Quarter-finals	2–2 (3–5 p)	(France) Bordeaux	1–1 at Stade du Parc Lescure, 1–1 (3–5 p) at Kryvyi Rih Stadion Metalurh (Note: FC Dnipro played their home matches at Kryvyi Rih Stadion Metalurh, Kryvyi Rih, instead of their regular stadium Dnipropetovsk Stadion Meteor, Dnipro as the city of Dnipropetrovsk was a closed city.)
1985–86	Presented by Russian clubs ( (Russia) Zenit Leningrad)				
1986–87	Dynamo Kyiv	Semi-finals	2–4	(Portugal) Porto	1–2 at Estádio das Antas, 1–2 at Respublikansky Stadion
1987–88	Dynamo Kyiv	First round	1–2	(Scotland) Rangers	1–0 at Respublikansky Stadion, 0–2 at Ibrox Stadium
1988–89	Presented by Russian clubs ( (Russia) Spartak Moscow)				
1989–90	Dnipro Dnipropetrovsk	Quarter-finals	0–4	(Portugal) Benfica	0–1 at Estádio da Luz, 0–3 at Stadion Meteor
1990–91	Presented by Russian clubs ( (Russia) Spartak Moscow)				
1991–92	Dynamo Kyiv	4th in group stage	N/A	(Spain) Barcelona, (Czechoslovakia) Sparta Prague, (Portugal) Benfica	
1992–93	Tavriya Simferopol	First round	2–7	(Switzerland) Sion	1–4 at Stade Tourbillon, 1–3 at Simferopol Stadion Lokomotyv
1993–94	Dynamo Kyiv	First round	4–5	(Spain) Barcelona	3–1 at Respublikansky Stadion, 1–4 at Camp Nou
1994–95	Dynamo Kyiv	4th in group stage	N/A	(France) Paris Saint-Germain, (Germany) Bayern Munich, (Russia) Spartak Moscow	
1995–96	Dynamo Kyiv	Qualifying round	4–1 (Disqualified)	(Denmark) AaB	1–0 at Respublikansky Stadion, 3–1 at Aalborg Stadium
1996–97	Dynamo Kyiv	Qualifying round (Transfer to UEFA)	2–6	(Austria) Rapid Wien	0–2 at Gerhard Hanappi Stadium, 2–4 at NSC Olimpiyskiy
1997–98	Dynamo Kyiv	Quarter-finals	2–5	(Italy) Juventus	1–1 at Stadio delle Alpi, 1–4 at NSC Olimpiyskiy
1998–99	Dynamo Kyiv	Semi-finals	3–4	(Germany) Bayern Munich	3–3 at NSC Olimpiyskiy, 0–1 at Olympiastadion
1999–2000	Dynamo Kyiv	3rd in second group stage	N/A	(Germany) Bayern Munich, (Spain) Real Madrid, (Norway) Rosenborg	
2000–01	Dynamo Kyiv	4th in first group stage	N/A	(Belgium) Anderlecht, (England) Manchester United, (Netherlands) PSV Eindhoven	
2000–01	Shakhtar Donetsk	3rd in first group stage (Transfer to UEFA)	N/A	(England) Arsenal, (Italy) Lazio, (Czech Republic) Sparta Prague	
2001–02	Dynamo Kyiv	4th in first group stage	N/A	(England) Liverpool, (Portugal) Boavista, (Germany) Borussia Dortmund	
2001–02	Shakhtar Donetsk	Third qualifying round	1–5	(Germany) Borussia Dortmund	0–2 at Tsentralny Stadion Shakhtar, 1–3 at Westfalenstadion
2002–03	Dynamo Kyiv	3rd in first group stage (Transfer to UEFA)	N/A	(Italy) Juventus, (England) Newcastle United, (Netherlands) Feyenoord	
2002–03	Shakhtar Donetsk	Third qualifying round (Transfer to UEFA)	2–2 (1–4 p)	(Belgium) Club Brugge	1–1 at Tsentralny Stadion Shakhtar, 1–1 (1–4 p) at Jan Breydel Stadium
2003–04	Dynamo Kyiv	4th in group stage	N/A	(England) Arsenal, (Russia) Lokomotiv Moscow, (Italy) Internazionale	
2003–04	Shakhtar Donetsk	Third qualifying round (Transfer to UEFA)	2–3	(Russia) Lokomotiv Moscow	1–0 at Tsentralny Stadion Shakhtar, 1–3 at Lokomotiv Stadium
2004–05	Dynamo Kyiv	3rd in group stage (Transfer to UEFA)	N/A	(Germany) Bayer Leverkusen, (Spain) Real Madrid, (Italy) Roma	
2004–05	Shakhtar Donetsk	3rd in group stage (Transfer to UEFA)	N/A	(Italy) Milan, (Spain) Barcelona, (Scotland) Celtic	
2005–06	Dynamo Kyiv	Second qualifying round	2–3	(Switzerland) Thun	2–2 at Stadion Dynamo imeni Valeria Lobanovskoho, 0–1 at Wankdorf Stadium
2005–06	Shakhtar Donetsk	Third qualifying round (Transfer to UEFA)	1–3	(Italy) Internazionale	0–2 at RSC Olimpiyskiy, 1–1 at San Siro
2006–07	Dynamo Kyiv	4th in group stage	N/A	(France) Lyon, (Spain) Real Madrid, (Romania) Steaua București	
2006–07	Shakhtar Donetsk	3rd in group stage (Transfer to UEFA)	N/A	(Spain) Valencia, (Italy) Roma, (Greece) Olympiacos	
2007–08	Dynamo Kyiv	4th in group stage	N/A	(England) Manchester United, (Italy) Roma, (Portugal) Sporting CP	
2007–08	Shakhtar Donetsk	4th in group stage	N/A	(Italy) Milan, (Scotland) Celtic, (Portugal) Benfica	
2008–09	Dynamo Kyiv	3rd in group stage (Transfer to UEFA)	N/A	(Portugal) Porto, (England) Arsenal, (Turkey) Fenerbahçe	
2008–09	Shakhtar Donetsk	3rd in group stage (Transfer to UEFA)	N/A	(Spain) Barcelona, (Portugal) Sporting CP, (Switzerland) Basel	
2009–10	Dynamo Kyiv	4th in group stage	N/A	(Spain) Barcelona, (Italy) Internazionale, (Russia) Rubin Kazan	
2009–10	Shakhtar Donetsk	Third qualifying round (Transfer to EL)	2–2 (a)	(Romania) Timișoara	2–2 at RSC Olimpiyskiy, 0–0 at Stadionul Dan Păltinișanu
2010–11	Dynamo Kyiv	Play-off round (Transfer to EL)	2–3	(Netherlands) Ajax	1–1 at Stadion Dynamo imeni Valeria Lobanovskoho, 1–2 at Amsterdam Arena
2010–11	Shakhtar Donetsk	Quarter-finals	1–6	(Spain) Barcelona	1–5 at Camp Nou, 0–1 at Donbas Arena
2011–12	Dynamo Kyiv	Third qualifying round (Transfer to EL)	1–4	(Russia) Rubin Kazan	0–2 at Stadion Dynamo imeni Valeria Lobanovskoho, 1–2 at Kazan Tsentralny Stadion
2011–12	Shakhtar Donetsk	4th in group stage	N/A	(Cyprus) APOEL, (Russia) Zenit Saint Petersburg, (Portugal) Porto	
2012–13	Dynamo Kyiv	3rd in group stage (Transfer to EL)	N/A	(France) Paris Saint-Germain, (Portugal) Porto, (Croatia) Dinamo Zagreb	
2012–13	Shakhtar Donetsk	Round of 16	2–5	(Germany) Borussia Dortmund	2–2 at Donbas Arena, 0–3 at Westfalenstadion
2013–14	Shakhtar Donetsk	3rd in group stage (Transfer to EL)	N/A	(England) Manchester United, (Germany) Bayer Leverkusen, (Spain) Real Sociedad	
2013–14	Metalist Kharkiv	Third qualifying round	3–1 (Disqualified)	(Greece) PAOK	2–0 at Toumba Stadium, 1–1 at OSC Metalist
2014–15	Shakhtar Donetsk	Round of 16	0–7	(Germany) Bayern Munich	0–0 at Arena Lviv, (Note: Shakhtar Donetsk played their home matches at Arena Lviv, Lviv, instead of their regular stadium Donbas Arena, Donetsk, due to the war conditions in Eastern Ukraine); 0–7 at Allianz Arena
2014–15	FC Dnipro Dnipropetrovsk	Third qualifying round (Transfer to EL)	0–2	(Denmark) Copenhagen	0–0 at NCS Olimpiyskiy, (Note: FC Dnipro played their home matches at NCS Olimpiyskiy, Kyiv, instead of their regular stadium Dnipro-Arena, Dnipro, due to the pro-Russian unrest in Ukraine.); 0–2 at Parken Stadium
2015–16	Shakhtar Donetsk	3rd in group stage (Transfer to EL)	N/A	(Spain) Real Madrid, (France) Paris Saint-Germain, (Sweden) Malmö FF	
2015–16	Dynamo Kyiv	Round of 16	1–3	(England) Manchester City	1–3 at NCS Olimpiyskiy, 0–0 at City of Manchester Stadium
2016–17	Shakhtar Donetsk	Third qualifying round (Transfer to EL)	2–2 (2–4 p)	(Switzerland) Young Boys	2–0 at Arena Lviv, 0–2 (2–4 p) at Stade de Suisse
2016–17	Dynamo Kyiv	4th in group stage	N/A	(Italy) Napoli, (Portugal) Benfica, (Turkey) Beşiktaş	
2017–18	Shakhtar Donetsk	Round of 16	2–2 (a)	(Italy) Roma	2–1 at OSC Metalist, (Note: Shakhtar Donetsk played their home match at OSC Metalist, Kharkiv instead of their regular stadium, Donbas Arena, Donetsk, due to the war in Donbas.); 0–1 at Stadio Olimpico
2017–18	Dynamo Kyiv	Third qualifying round (Transfer to EL)	3–3 (a)	(Switzerland) Young Boys	3–1 at NSC Olimpiyskiy, 0–2 at Stade de Suisse
2018–19	Shakhtar Donetsk	3rd in group stage (Transfer to EL)	N/A	(England) Manchester City, (France) Lyon, (Germany) 1899 Hoffenheim	
2018–19	Dynamo Kyiv	Play-off round (Transfer to EL)	1–3	(Netherlands) Ajax	1–3 at Johan Cruyff Arena, 0–0 at NSC Olimpiyskiy
2019–20	Shakhtar Donetsk	3rd in group stage (Transfer to EL)	N/A	(England) Manchester City, (Italy) Atalanta, (Croatia) Dinamo Zagreb	
2019–20	Dynamo Kyiv	Third qualifying round (Transfer to EL)	3–4	(Belgium) Club Brugge	0–1 at Jan Breydel Stadium, 3–3 at NSC Olimpiyskiy
2020–21	Shakhtar Donetsk	3rd in group stage (Transfer to EL)	N/A	(Spain) Real Madrid, (Germany) Borussia Mönchengladbach, (Italy) Internazionale	
2020–21	Dynamo Kyiv	3rd in group stage (Transfer to EL)	N/A	(Italy) Juventus, (Spain) Barcelona, (Hungary) Ferencváros	
2021–22	Shakhtar Donetsk	4th in group stage	N/A	(Spain) Real Madrid, (Italy) Internazionale, (Moldova) Sheriff Tiraspol	
2021–22	Dynamo Kyiv	4th in group stage	N/A	(Germany) Bayern Munich, (Portugal) Benfica, (Spain) Barcelona	
2022–23	Shakhtar Donetsk	3rd in group stage (Transfer to EL)	N/A	(Spain) Real Madrid, (Germany) RB Leipzig, (Scotland) Celtic	
2022–23	Dynamo Kyiv	Play-off round (Transfer to EL)	0–5	(Portugal) Benfica	0–2 at Stadion Miejski im. Władysława Króla, 0–3 at Estádio da Luz
2023–24	Shakhtar Donetsk	3rd in group stage (Transfer to EL)	N/A	(Spain) Barcelona, (Portugal) Porto, (Belgium) Antwerp	
2023–24	Dnipro-1	Second qualifying round (Transfer to EL)	3–5	(Greece) Panathinaikos	1–3 at Košická futbalová aréna, 2–2 at Leoforos Alexandras Stadium
2024–25	Shakhtar Donetsk	League phase	N/A	27th place	
2024–25	Dynamo Kyiv	Play-off round (Transfer to EL)	1–3	(Austria) Red Bull Salzburg	0–2 at Arena Lublin, 1–1 at Red Bull Arena
2025–26	Dynamo Kyiv	Third qualifying round (Transfer to EL)	0–3	(Cyprus) Pafos	0–1 at Arena Lublin, 0–2 at Alphamega Stadium
2026–27	Shakhtar Donetsk	N/A			

Note: UEFA/EL denotes qualified for the UEFA Cup/Europa League.

== UEFA Europa League/UEFA Cup ==
Until 1992–93 Ukrainian teams represented the Soviet Union. The Soviet teams did not play in the Inter-Cities Fairs Cup. In 2009 the competition's name has changed to UEFA Europa League.

Notes: Blue border colour indicates seasons for which UEFA coefficient earned by Ukrainian clubs was awarded to Russia.

Year	Team	Progress	Score	Opponents	Venue(s)
1971–72	Presented by Russian clubs ( (Russia) Spartak Moscow)				
1972–73	Presented by Armenian and Georgian clubs ( (Armenia) Ararat Yerevan, (Georgia (country)) Dinamo Tbilisi)				
1973–74	Presented by Georgian clubs ( (Georgia (country)) Dinamo Tbilisi)				
1973–74	Dynamo Kyiv	Third round	2–3	(Germany) VfB Stuttgart	2–0 at Kyiv Tsentralny Stadion, 0–3 at Neckarstadion
1974–75	Presented by two Russian clubs ( (Russia) Spartak Moscow, (Russia) Dinamo Moscow)				
1975–76	Presented by two Russian clubs ( (Russia) Spartak Moscow, (Russia) Torpedo Moscow)				
1975–76	Chornomorets Odesa	First round	1–3	(Italy) Lazio	1–0 at Tsentralny Stadion ChMP, 0–3 at Stadio Olimpico
1976–77	Presented by Russian clubs ( (Russia) Dinamo Moscow)				
1976–77	Shakhtar Donetsk	Third round	1–3	(Italy) Juventus	3–0 at Stadio Comunale, 0–1 at Tsentralny Stadion Shakhtar
1977–78	Presented by Georgian clubs ( (Georgia (country)) Dinamo Tbilisi)				
1977–78	Dynamo Kyiv	First round	1–1 (a)	(Germany) Eintracht Braunschweig	1–1 at Kyiv Tsentralny Stadion, 0–0 (a) at Eintracht-Stadion
1978–79	Presented by Georgian and Russian clubs ( (Russia) Torpedo Moscow, (Georgia (country)) Dinamo Tbilisi)				
1979–80	Dynamo Kyiv	Third round	2–2 (a)	(Bulgaria) Lokomotiv Sofia	1–0 at Natsionalen Stadion Vasil Levski, 1–2 (a) at Kyiv Stadion Dynamo (Note: Dynamo Kyiv played their home matches at Kyiv Stadion Dynamo, Kyiv, instead of their regular stadium Kyiv Tsentralny Stadion, Kyiv, due to reconstruction in preparation to the 1980 Summer Olympics.)
1979–80	Shakhtar Donetsk	First round	2–3	(France) Monaco	2–1 at Donetsk Stadion Lokomotyv, 0–2 at Stade Louis II
1980–81	Presented by Russian clubs ( (Russia) Dinamo Moscow)				
1980–81	Dynamo Kyiv	First round	1–1 (a)	(Bulgaria) Levski Sofia	1–1 at Respublikansky Stadion, 0–0 (a) at Natsionalen Stadion Vasil Levski
1980–81	Shakhtar Donetsk	First round	1–3	(Germany) Eintracht Frankfurt	1–0 at Donetsk Stadion Lokomotyv, 0–3 at Waldstadion
1981–82	Presented by three Russian clubs ( (Russia) Spartak Moscow, (Russia) Zenit Leningrad, (Russia) CSKA Moscow)				
1982–83	Presented by two Russian and Georgian clubs ( (Russia) Spartak Moscow, (Russia) Dinamo Moscow, (Georgia (country)) Dinamo Tbilisi)				
1983–84	Presented by Russian clubs ( (Russia) Spartak Moscow)				
1983–84	Dynamo Kyiv	First round	0–1	(France) Laval	0–0 at Respublikansky Stadion, 0–1 at Stade Francis Le Basser
1984–85	Presented by Russian and Belarusian clubs ( (Russia) Spartak Moscow, (Belarus) Dinamo Minsk)				
1985–86	Presented by Russian clubs ( (Russia) Spartak Moscow)				
1985–86	Chornomorets Odesa	Second round	1–2	(Spain) Real Madrid	1–2 at Santiago Bernabéu Stadium, 0–0 at Tsentralny Stadion ChMP
1985–86	Dnipro Dnipropetrovsk	Third round	0–3	(Socialist Federal Republic of Yugoslavia) Hajduk Split (Note: Croatian, not Serbian, club from Yugoslavia)	0–1 at Kryvyi Rih Stadion Metalurh, 0–2 at Stadion Poljud
1986–87	Presented by Russian and Belarusian clubs ( (Russia) Spartak Moscow, (Belarus) Dinamo Minsk)				
1986–87	Dnipro Dnipropetrovsk	First round	0–1	(Poland) Legia Warsaw	0–0 at Stadion Wojska Polskiego, 0–1 at Kryvyi Rih Stadion Metalurh
1987–88	Presented by three Russian and Georgian clubs ( (Russia) Spartak Moscow, (Russia) Dinamo Moscow, (Russia) Zenit Leningrad, (Georgia (country)) Dinamo Tbilisi)				
1988–89	Presented by Russian, Lithuanian and Belarusian clubs ( (Russia) Torpedo Moscow, (Lithuania) Žalgiris, (Belarus) Dinamo Minsk)				
1988–89	Dnipro Dnipropetrovsk	First round	2–3	(France) Bordeaux	1–1 at Dnipropetrovsk Stadion Meteor, 1–2 at Parc Lescure
1989–90	Presented by two Russian and Lithuanian clubs ( (Russia) Spartak Moscow, (Russia) Zenit Leningrad, (Lithuania) Žalgiris)				
1989–90	Dynamo Kyiv	Third round	0–1	(Italy) Fiorentina	0–1 at Stadio Renato Curi, 0–0 at Respublikansky Stadion
1990–91	Presented by Russian clubs ( (Russia) Torpedo Moscow)				
1990–91	Chornomorets Odesa	Second round	0–1	(France) Monaco	0–0 at Tsentralny Stadion ChMP, 0–1 at Stade Louis II
1990–91	Dnipro Dnipropetrovsk	First round	2–4	(Scotland) Heart of Midlothian	1–1 at Dnipropetrovsk Stadion Meteor, 1–3 at Tynecastle Stadium
1991–92	Presented by three Russian clubs ( (Russia) Spartak Moscow, (Russia) Dinamo Moscow, (Russia) Torpedo Moscow)				
1992–93	Dynamo Kyiv	Second round	2–7	(Belgium) Anderlecht	2–4 at Constant Vanden Stock Stadium, 0–3 at Respublikansky Stadion
1993–94	Dnipro Dnipropetrovsk	Second round	1–2	(Germany) Eintracht Frankfurt	0–2 at Waldstadion, 1–0 at Stadion Meteor
1994–95	Shakhtar Donetsk	Preliminary round	3–4	(Norway) Lillestrøm	1–4 at Åråsen Stadion, 2–0 at Tsentralny Stadion Shakhtar
1995–96	Chornomorets Odesa	Second round	0–4	(France) Lens	0–0 at Tsentralny Stadion ChMP, 0–4 at Stade Félix-Bollaert
1996–97	Chornomorets Odesa	First round	0–2	(Romania) Naţional București	0–0 at Tsentralny Stadion ChMP, 0–2 at Stadionul Cotroceni
1996–97	Dynamo Kyiv	First round	1–2	(Switzerland) Neuchâtel Xamax	0–0 at NSC Olimpiyskiy, 1–2 at Stade de la Maladière
1997–98	Vorskla Poltava	Second qualifying round	0–4	(Belgium) Anderlecht	0–2 at Constant Vanden Stock Stadium, 0–2 at Stadion Vorskla
1997–98	Dnipro Dnipropetrovsk	Second qualifying round	2–6	(Russia) Alania Vladikavkaz	1–2 at Respublikanskiy Stadion Spartak, 1–4 at Stadion Meteor
1998–99	Shakhtar Donetsk	Second qualifying round	3–6	(Switzerland) Zürich	0–4 at Letzigrund, 3–2 at Tsentralny Stadion Shakhtar
1999–2000	Shakhtar Donetsk	First round	1–5	(Netherlands) Roda JC	0–2 at Gemeentelijk Sportpark Kaalheide, 1–3 at Tsentralny Stadion Shakhtar
1999–2000	Karpaty Lviv	First round	2–2 (2–4 p)	(Sweden) Helsingborgs IF	1–1 at Olympia, 1–1 (2–4 p) at Stadion Ukrayina
1999–2000	Kryvbas Kryvyi Rih	First round	2–6	(Italy) Parma	2–3 at Stadio Ennio Tardini, 0–3 at Kryvyi Rih Stadion Metalurh
2000–01	Shakhtar Donetsk	Third round	0–1	(Spain) Celta Vigo	0–0 at Tsentralny Stadion Shakhtar, 0–1 at Balaídos
2000–01	Kryvbas Kryvyi Rih	First round	0–6	(France) Nantes	0–1 at Kryvyi Rih Stadion Metalurh, 0–5 at Stade de la Beaujoire
2000–01	Vorskla Poltava	First round	2–4	(Portugal) Boavista	1–2 at Stadion Vorskla, 1–2 at Estádio do Bessa
2001–02	CSKA Kyiv	Second round	0–7	(Belgium) Club Brugge	0–2 at Kyiv Stadion Dynamo, (Note: CSKA Kyiv played their home matches at Kyiv Stadion Dynamo, Kyiv, instead of their regular stadium Stadion TsSK ZSU, Kyiv as it did not meet UEFA requirements.); 0–5 at Jan Breydel Stadium
2001–02	Dnipro Dnipropetrovsk	First round	1–2	(Italy) Fiorentina	0–0 at Stadion Meteor, 1–2 at Stadio Artemio Franchi
2001–02	Shakhtar Donetsk	First round	2–4	(Bulgaria) CSKA Sofia	0–3 at Balgarska Armia, 2–1 at Tsentralny Stadion Shakhtar
2002–03	Dynamo Kyiv	Third round	1–3	(Turkey) Beşiktaş	1–3 at BJK İnönü Stadium, 0–0 at Olimpiyskiy NSC
2002–03	Shakhtar Donetsk	First round	2–5	Austria Wien	1–5 at Ernst-Happel-Stadion, 1–0 at Tsentralny Stadion Shakhtar
2002–03	Metalurh Donetsk	First round	2–10	(Germany) Werder Bremen	2–2 at Tsentralny Stadion Shakhtar, 0–8 at Weser-Stadion
2002–03	Metalurh Zaporizhya	First round	1–2	(England) Leeds United	0–1 at Elland Road, 1–1 at Stadion Meteor (Note: Metalurh Zaporizhya played their home match at Stadion Meteor, Dnipropetrovsk, instead of their regular stadium Metalurh Stadium, Zaporizhzhia, due to reconstruction of latter.)
2003–04	Dnipro Dnipropetrovsk	Third round	0–1	(France) Marseille	0–1 at Stade Vélodrome, 0–0 at Stadion Meteor
2003–04	Shakhtar Donetsk	First round	2–5	(Romania) Dinamo București	0–2 at Stadionul Dinamo, 2–3 at Tsentralny Stadion Shakhtar
2003–04	Metalurh Donetsk	First round	1–4	(Italy) Parma	1–1 at RSC Olimpiyskiy, 0–3 at Stadio Ennio Tardini
2004–05	Shakhtar Donetsk	Round of 16	2–5	(Netherlands) AZ	1–3 at RSC Olimpiyskiy, 1–2 at Alkmaarderhout
2004–05	Dynamo Kyiv	Round of 32	0–2	(Spain) Villarreal	0–0 at Stadion Dynamo imeni Valeria Lobanovskoho, 0–2 at Estadio de la Cerámica
2004–05	Dnipro Dnipropetrovsk	Round of 32	2–3	(Serbia and Montenegro) Partizan	2–2 at Stadion Partizana, 0–1 at Stadion Meteor
2004–05	Metalurh Donetsk	First round	0–6	(Italy) Lazio	0–3 at Tsentralny Stadion Shakhtar, 0–3 at Stadio Olimpico
2004–05	Illichivets Mariupol	Second qualifying round	0–3	Austria Wien	0–0 at Mariupol Stadion Illichivets, 0–3 at Franz Horr Stadium
2005–06	Shakhtar Donetsk	Round of 32	2–3	(France) Lille	2–3 at Stadium Nord Lille Métropole, 0–0 at RSC Olimpiyskiy
2005–06	Dnipro Dnipropetrovsk	4th in group stage	N/A	(England) Middlesbrough, (Netherlands) AZ, (Bulgaria) Litex Lovech, (Switzerland) Grasshopper	
2005–06	Metalurh Donetsk	First round	3–3 (a)	(Greece) PAOK	1–1 at Toumba Stadium, 2–2 at Tsentralny Stadion Shakhtar
2006–07	Shakhtar Donetsk	Round of 16	4–5 (a.e.t.)	(Spain) Sevilla	2–2 at Ramón Sánchez Pizjuán, 2–3 (a.e.t.) at RSC Olimpiyskiy
2006–07	Chornomorets Odesa	First round	1–4	(Israel) Hapoel Tel Aviv	0–1 at Tsentralny Stadion ChMP, 1–3 at Bloomfield Stadium
2006–07	Metalurh Zaporizhya	First round	1–2	(Greece) Panathinaikos	1–1 at Pampeloponnisiako Stadium, (Note: Panathinaikos played their home match at Pampeloponnisiako Stadium, Patras, instead of their regular stadium Olympic Stadium, Athens, due to 2006 IAAF World Cup being held there.); 0–1 at Slavutych-Arena
2007–08	Dnipro Dnipropetrovsk	First round	1–1 (a)	(Scotland) Aberdeen	0–0 at Pittodrie Stadium, 1–1 (a) at Stadion Meteor
2007–08	Metalist Kharkiv	First round	3–4	(England) Everton	1–1 at Goodison Park, 2–3 at OSC Metalist
2008–09	Shakhtar Donetsk	Winners	2–1 (a.e.t.)	(Germany) Werder Bremen	Şükrü Saracoğlu Stadium
2008–09	Dynamo Kyiv	Semi-finals	2–3	(Ukraine) Shakhtar Donetsk	1–1 at Stadion Dynamo imeni Valeria Lobanovskoho, 1–2 at RSC Olimpiyskiy
2008–09	Metalist Kharkiv	Round of 16	3–3 (a)	(Ukraine) Dynamo Kyiv	0–1 at Stadion Dynamo imeni Valeria Lobanovskoho, 3–2 (a) at OSC Metalist
2008–09	Dnipro Dnipropetrovsk	Second qualifying round	4–4 (a)	(Switzerland) Bellinzona	3–2 at Stadion Meteor, 1–2 (a) at Cornaredo Stadium (Note: Bellinzona played their home match at Cornaredo Stadium, Lugano, instead of their regular stadium Stadio Comunale Bellinzona, Bellinzona as it did not meet UEFA criteria.)
2009–10	Shakhtar Donetsk	Round of 32	2–3	(England) Fulham	1–2 at Craven Cottage, 1–1 at Donbas Arena
2009–10	Vorskla Poltava	Play-off round	2–5	(Portugal) Benfica	0–4 at Estádio da Luz, 2–1 at Stadion Vorskla imeni Oleksia Butovskoho
2009–10	Metalist Kharkiv	Play-off round	1–2	(Austria) Sturm Graz	1–1 at UPC-Arena, 0–1 at OSC Metalist
2009–10	Metalurh Donetsk	Play-off round	4–5 (a.e.t.)	Austria Wien	2–2 at Donetsk Stadion Metalurh, 2–3 (a.e.t.) at Franz Horr Stadium
2010–11	Dynamo Kyiv	Quarter-finals	1–1 (a)	(Portugal) Braga	1–1 at Stadion Dynamo imeni Valeria Lobanovskoho, 0–0 (a) at Estádio Municipal de Braga
2010–11	Metalist Kharkiv	Round of 32	0–6	(Germany) Bayer Leverkusen	0–4 at OSC Metalist, 0–2 at BayArena
2010–11	Karpaty Lviv	4th in group stage	N/A	(France) Paris Saint-Germain, (Spain) Sevilla, (Germany) Borussia Dortmund	
2010–11	Dnipro Dnipropetrovsk	Play-off round	0–1	(Poland) Lech Poznań	0–1 at Dnipro-Arena, 0–0 at Poznań Stadion Miejski
2010–11	Tavriya Simferopol	Play-off round	1–6	(Germany) Bayer Leverkusen	0–3 at BayArena, 1–3 at RSC Lokomotyv
2011–12	Metalist Kharkiv	Quarter-finals	2–3	(Portugal) Sporting CP	1–2 at Estádio José Alvalade, 1–1 at OSC Metalist
2011–12	Dynamo Kyiv	3rd in group stage	N/A	(Turkey) Beşiktaş, (England) Stoke City, (Israel) Maccabi Tel Aviv	
2011–12	Vorskla Poltava	4th in group stage	N/A	(Belgium) Standard Liège, (Germany) Hannover 96, (Denmark) Copenhagen	
2011–12	Dnipro Dnipropetrovsk	Play-off round	1–3	(England) Fulham	0–3 at Craven Cottage, 1–0 at Dnipro-Arena
2011–12	Karpaty Lviv	Play-off round	1–3	(Greece) PAOK	0–2 at Toumba Stadium, 1–1 at Stadion Ukrayina
2012–13	Dynamo Kyiv	Round of 32	1–2	(France) Bordeaux	1–1 at NSC Olimpiyskiy, 0–1 at Stade Chaban-Delmas
2012–13	Dnipro Dnipropetrovsk	Round of 32	1–3	(Switzerland) Basel	0–2 at St. Jakob-Park, 1–1 at Dnipro-Arena
2012–13	Metalist Kharkiv	Round of 32	0–1	(England) Newcastle United	0–0 at St James' Park, 0–1 at OSC Metalist
2012–13	Metalurh Donetsk	Third qualifying round	1–2	(Norway) Tromsø	1–1 at Alfheim Stadion, 0–1 at Donetsk Stadion Metalurh
2012–13	Arsenal Kyiv	Third qualifying round	2–3	(Slovenia) Mura 05	0–3 (Note: UEFA awarded Mura 05 a 3–0 win due to Arsenal Kyiv fielding suspended player Éric Matoukou in the first leg. The original match had ended in a 3–0 win for Arsenal Kyiv.) at Stadion Dynamo imeni Valeria Lobanovskoho, 2–0 at Ljudski vrt
2013–14	Shakhtar Donetsk	Round of 32	2–3	(Czech Republic) Viktoria Plzeň	1–1 at Doosan Arena, 1–2 at Donbas Arena
2013–14	Dynamo Kyiv	Round of 32	0–2	(Spain) Valencia	0–2 at GSP Stadium, (Note: On 19 February 2014, UEFA announced that it had decided to change the venue of the Dynamo Kyiv v Valencia match from NSC Olimpiyskiy, Kyiv, to GSP Stadium, Nicosia, due to riots in Kyiv.); 0–0 at Mestalla
2013–14	Chornomorets Odesa	Round of 32	0–1	(France) Lyon	0–0 at Chornomorets Stadium, 0–1 at Stade de Gerland
2013–14	Dnipro Dnipropetrovsk	Round of 32	2–3	(England) Tottenham Hotspur	1–0 at Dnipro-Arena, 1–3 at White Hart Lane
2013–14	Metalurh Donetsk	Third qualifying round	1–2	(Albania) Kukësi	0–2 at Qemal Stafa Stadium, 1–0 at Donetsk Stadion Metalurh
2014–15	Dnipro Dnipropetrovsk	Final	2–3	(Spain) Sevilla	Stadion Narodowy
2014–15	Dynamo Kyiv	Quarter-finals	1–3	(Italy) Fiorentina	1–1 at NSC Olimpiyskiy, 0–2 at Stadio Artemio Franchi
2014–15	Metalist Kharkiv	4th in group stage	N/A	(Poland) Legia Warsaw, (Turkey) Trabzonspor, (Belgium) Lokeren	
2014–15	Zorya Luhansk	Play-off round	4–5	(Netherlands) Feyenoord	1–1 at Stadion Dynamo imeni Valeria Lobanovskoho, (Note: The match was played at Stadion Dynamo imeni Valeria Lobanovskoho, Kyiv instead of Zorya Luhansk's home stadium, Luhansk Stadion Avanhard, Luhansk, due to the war conditions in Eastern Ukraine.); 3–4 at Donetsk Stadion Metalurh
2014–15	Chornomorets Odesa	Third qualifying round	0–2	(Croatia) Split	0–2 at Stadion Park Mladeži, 0–0 at Stadion Chornomorets
2015–16	Shakhtar Donetsk	Semi-finals	3–5	(Spain) Sevilla	2–2 at Arena Lviv, 1–3 at Ramón Sánchez Pizjuán
2015–16	Dnipro Dnipropetrovsk	3rd in group stage	N/A	(Italy) Lazio, (France) Saint-Étienne, (Norway) Rosenborg	
2015–16	Zorya Luhansk	Play-off round	2–4	(Poland) Legia Warsaw	0–1 at Stadion Dynamo imeni Valeria Lobanovskoho, 2–3 at Stadion Wojska Polskiego
2015–16	Vorskla Poltava	Third qualifying round	3–3 (a)	(Slovakia) Žilina	0–2 at Štadión pod Dubňom, 3–1 (a.e.t.) at Stadion Vorskla imeni Oleksia Butovskoho
2016–17	Shakhtar Donetsk	Round of 32	1–2 (a.e.t.)	(Spain) Celta Vigo	1–0 at Balaídos, 0–2 (a.e.t.) at OSC Metalist
2016–17	Zorya Luhansk	4th in group stage	N/A	(Turkey) Fenerbahçe, (England) Manchester United, (Netherlands) Feyenoord	
2016–17	Vorskla Poltava	Third qualifying round	2–3	(Croatia) Lokomotiva	0–0 at Stadion Maksimir, (Note: Lokomotiva played their third qualifying round and play-off round home matches at Stadion Maksimir, Zagreb, instead of their regular stadium Stadion Kranjčevićeva, Zagreb.); 2–3 at Stadion Vorskla imeni Oleksia Butovskoho
2016–17	Oleksandriya	Third qualifying round	1–6	(Croatia) Hajduk Split	0–3 at CSC Nika, 1–3 at Stadion Poljud
2017–18	Dynamo Kyiv	Round of 16	2–4	(Italy) Lazio	2–2 at Stadio Olimpico, 0–2 at NSC Olimpiyskiy
2017–18	Zorya Luhansk	3rd in group stage	N/A	(Spain) Athletic Bilbao, (Sweden) Östersund, (Germany) Hertha BSC	
2017–18	Oleksandriya	Play-off round	2–3	(Belarus) BATE Borisov	1–1 at Borisov Arena, 1–2 at CSC Nika
2017–18	Olimpik Donetsk	Third qualifying round	1–3	(Greece) PAOK	1–1 at Stadion Dynamo imeni Valeria Lobanovskoho, (Note: The match was played at Stadion Dynamo imeni Valeria Lobanovskoho, Kyiv instead of Zorya Luhansk's home stadium, Luhansk Stadion Avanhard, Luhansk, due to the war conditions in Eastern Ukraine.); 0–2 at Toumba Stadium
2018–19	Dynamo Kyiv	Round of 16	0–8	(England) Chelsea	0–3 at Stamford Bridge, 0–5 at NSC Olimpiyskiy
2018–19	Shakhtar Donetsk	Round of 32	3–6	(Germany) Eintracht Frankfurt	2–2 at OSC Metalist, 1–4 at Waldstadion
2018–19	Vorskla Poltava	3rd in group stage	N/A	(England) Arsenal, (Portugal) Sporting CP, (Azerbaijan) Qarabağ	
2018–19	Zorya Luhansk	Play-off round	2–3	(Germany) RB Leipzig	0–0 at Slavutych-Arena, (Note: The match was played at Slavutych-Arena, Zaporizhzhia instead of Zorya Luhansk's home stadium, Luhansk Stadion Avanhard, Luhansk, due to the war conditions in Eastern Ukraine.); 2–3 at Red Bull Arena
2018–19	Mariupol	Third qualifying round	2–5	(France) Bordeaux	1–3 at Stadion Chornomorets, (Note: The match was played at Stadion Chornomorets, Odesa instead of Mariupol's home stadium, Stadion imeni Volodymyra Boika, Mariupol, due to the war conditions in Eastern Ukraine.); 1–2 at Nouveau Stade de Bordeaux
2019–20	Shakhtar Donetsk	Semi-finals	0–5	(Italy) Internazionale	0–5 at Merkur Spiel-Arena
2019–20	Dynamo Kyiv	3rd in group stage	N/A	(Sweden) Malmö FF, (Denmark) Copenhagen, (Switzerland) Lugano	
2019–20	Oleksandriya	4th in group stage	N/A	(Belgium) Gent, (Germany) VfL Wolfsburg, (France) Saint-Étienne	
2019–20	Mariupol	Third qualifying round	0–4	(Netherlands) AZ	0–0 at Stadion Chornomorets, 0–4 at Cars Jeans Stadion (Note: After a roof collapse on 10 August 2019 at their regular stadium, AFAS Stadion, Alkmaar, AZ's third qualifying round home match was moved to Cars Jeans Stadion, The Hague.)
2019–20	Zorya Luhansk	Play-off round	3–5	(Spain) Espanyol	1–3 at RCDE Stadium, 2–2 at Slavutych-Arena (Note: Zorya Luhansk played their home matches at Slavutych-Arena, Zaporizhzhia, instead of their regular stadium Avanhard Stadium, Luhansk, due to the war conditions in Eastern Ukraine.)
2020–21	Shakhtar Donetsk	Round of 16	1–5	(Italy) Roma	0–3 at Stadio Olimpico, 1–2 at NSC Olimpiyskiy (Note: Shakhtar Donetsk played their home match at NSC Olimpiyskiy, Kyiv instead of their regular stadium, Donbas Arena, Donetsk, due to the war in Donbas.)
2020–21	Dynamo Kyiv	Round of 16	0–4	(Spain) Villarreal	0–2 at NSC Olimpiyskiy, 0–2 at Estadio de la Cerámica
2020–21	Zorya Luhansk	3rd in group stage	N/A	(England) Leicester City, (Portugal) Braga, (Greece) AEK Athens	
2020–21	Desna Chernihiv	Third qualifying round	0–2	(Germany) VfL Wolfsburg	0–2 at AOK Stadion; (Note: VfL Wolfsburg played their home match at AOK Stadion, instead of their regular stadium Volkswagen Arena, as a cost-saving measure.)
2020–21	Kolos Kovalivka	Third qualifying round	0–2 (a.e.t.)	(Croatia) Rijeka	0–2 at Stadion Rujevica
2021–22	Zorya Luhansk	Play-off round (Transfer to ECL)	2–6	(Austria) Rapid Wien	0–3 at Allianz Stadion, 2–3 at Slavutych-Arena
2022–23	Shakhtar Donetsk	Round of 16	2–8	(Netherlands) Feyenoord	1–1 at Stadion Wojska Polskiego, 1–7 at De Kuip
2022–23	Dynamo Kyiv	4th in group stage	N/A	(Turkey) Fenerbahçe, (France) Rennes, (Cyprus) AEK Larnaca	
2022–23	Dnipro-1	Play-off round (Transfer to ECL)	1–5	(Cyprus) AEK Larnaca	1–2 at Košická futbalová aréna, 0–3 at AEK Arena – Georgios Karapatakis
2023–24	Shakhtar Donetsk	Knockout round play-offs	3–5	(France) Marseille	2–2 at Volksparkstadion, 1–3 at Stade Vélodrome
2023–24	Zorya Luhansk	Play-off round (Transfer to ECL)	2–3	(Czech Republic) Slavia Prague	0–2 at Fortuna Arena, 2–1 at Arena Lublin
2023–24	Dnipro-1	Third qualifying round (Transfer to ECL)	1–4	(Czech Republic) Slavia Prague	0–3 at Fortuna Arena, 1–1 at Košická futbalová aréna
2024–25	Dynamo Kyiv	League phase	N/A	34th place	
2024–25	Kryvbas Kryvyi Rih	Third qualifying round (Transfer to ECL)	1–3	(Czech Republic) Viktoria Plzeň	1–2 at Košická futbalová aréna, 0–1 at Doosan Arena
2025–26	Dynamo Kyiv	Play-off round (Transfer to ECL)	2–3	(Israel) Maccabi Tel Aviv	1–3 at TSC Arena, 1–0 at Arena Lublin
2025–26	Shakhtar Donetsk	Third qualifying round (Transfer to ECL)	0–0 (3–4 p)	(Greece) Panathinaikos	0–0 at Olympic Stadium, 0–0 at Henryk Reyman Municipal Stadium
2026–27	Dynamo Kyiv	Second qualifying round (Transfer to ECL)	2–5	(Greece) PAOK	2–3 at Arena Lublin, 0–2 at Toumba Stadium

== UEFA Conference League ==
Year	Team	Progress	Score	Opponents	Venue(s)
2021–22	Zorya Luhansk	3rd in group stage	N/A	(Italy) Roma, (Norway) Bodø/Glimt, (Bulgaria) CSKA Sofia	
2021–22	Kolos Kovalivka	Third qualifying round	0–0 (1–3 p)	(Kazakhstan) Shakther Karagandy	0–0 at Kolos Stadium, 0–0 at Astana Arena
2021–22	Vorskla Poltava	Second qualifying round	4–5 (a.e.t.)	(Finland) KuPS	2–2 at Kuopio Football Stadium, 2–3 at Oleksiy Butovsky Vorskla Stadium
2022–23	Dnipro-1	Knockout round play-offs	0–1	(Cyprus) AEK Larnaca	0–0 at Košická futbalová aréna, 0–1 at AEK Arena – Georgios Karapatakis
2022–23	Zorya Luhansk	Third qualifying round	1–3	(Romania) Universitatea Craiova	1–0 at Arena Lublin, 0–3 at Stadionul Ion Oblemenco
2022–23	Vorskla Poltava	Second qualifying round	3–4 (a.e.t.)	(Sweden) AIK	3–2 at Tele2 Arena, 0–2 at Friends Arena
2023–24	Zorya Luhansk	3rd in group stage	N/A	(Belgium) Gent, (Israel) Maccabi Tel Aviv, (Iceland) Breiðablik	
2023–24	Dnipro-1	Play-off round	2–3	(Slovakia) Spartak Trnava	1–1 at Anton Malatinský Stadium, 1–2 (a.e.t.) at Košická futbalová aréna
2023–24	Dynamo Kyiv	Play-off round	2–4	(Turkey) Beşiktaş	2–3 at Stadionul Rapid-Giulești, 0–1 at Beşiktaş Park
2023–24	Vorskla Poltava	Second qualifying round	3–4	(Georgia (country)) Dila Gori	2–1 at Stadion Miejski, 1–3 at Tengiz Burjanadze Stadium
2024–25	Kryvbas Kryvyi Rih	Play-off round	0–5	(Spain) Real Betis	0–2 at Košická futbalová aréna, 0–3 at Benito Villamarín
2024–25	Polissya Zhytomyr	Second qualifying round	1–4	(Slovenia) Olimpija Ljubljana	0–2 at Stožice Stadium, 1–2 at Piotr Wieczorek Municipal Stadium
2024–25	Dnipro-1	Second qualifying round	0–6	(Hungary) Puskás Akadémia	0–3 (awarded by forfeit), 0–3 (awarded by forfeit)
2025–26	Shakhtar Donetsk	Semi-finals	2–5	(England) Crystal Palace	1–3 at Henryk Reyman Municipal Stadium, 1–2 at Selhurst Park
2025–26	Dynamo Kyiv	League phase	N/A	27th place	
2025–26	Polissya Zhytomyr	Play-off round	2–6	(Italy) Fiorentina	0–3 at Futbal Tatran Arena, 2–3 at Mapei Stadium – Città del Tricolore
2025–26	Oleksandriya	Second qualifying round	0–6	(Serbia) Partizan	0–2 at Arena Katowice, 0–4 at Partizan Stadium
2026–27	Dynamo Kyiv	Third qualifying round	1–2	(Azerbaijan) Qarabağ	1–0 at Arena Lublin, 0–2 at Tofiq Bahramov Republican Stadium
2026–27	Polissya Zhytomyr	Second qualifying round	4–5	(Denmark) Copenhagen	3–3 at Košická futbalová aréna, 1–2 at Parken Stadium
2026–27	LNZ Cherkasy	Second qualifying round	0–0 (2–4 p)	(Belgium) Gent	0–0 at Kazimierz Górski Stadium, 0–0 at Planet Group Arena

== UEFA Cup Winners' Cup ==
The UEFA Cup Winners' Cup became the first continental competition in which Soviet clubs began their international participation in 1965. Until 1992–93 Ukrainian teams represented the Soviet Union.

Notes: Blue border colour indicates seasons for which UEFA coefficient earned by Ukrainian clubs was awarded to Russia.

Year	Team	Progress	Score	Opponents	Venue(s)
1960–61	None entered				
1961–62	None entered				
1962–63	None entered				
1963–64	None entered				
1964–65	None entered				
1965–66	Dynamo Kyiv	Quarter-finals	1–4	(Scotland) Celtic	0–3 at Celtic Park, 1–1 at Tbilisi Stadion Dinamo imenni Vladimira Lenina
1966–67	Presented by Russian clubs ( (Russia) Spartak Moscow)				
1967–68	Presented by Russian clubs ( (Russia) Torpedo Moscow)				
1968–69	Soviet boycott, presented by Russian clubs ( (Russia) Dynamo Moscow)				
1969–70	Presented by Russian clubs ( (Russia) Torpedo Moscow)				
1970–71	Karpaty Lviv	First round	3–4	(Romania) Steaua București	0–1 at Stadion Druzhba, 3–3 at Stadionul Republicii
1971–72	Presented by Russian clubs ( (Russia) Dynamo Moscow)				
1972–73	Presented by Russian clubs ( (Russia) Spartak Moscow)				
1973–74	Presented by Russian clubs ( (Russia) Torpedo Moscow)				
1974–75	Dynamo Kyiv	Winners	3–0	(Hungary) Ferencváros	St. Jakob Stadium
1975–76	Presented by Armenian clubs ( (Armenia) Ararat Yerevan)				
1976–77	Presented by Georgian clubs ( (Georgia (country)) Dinamo Tbilisi)				
1977–78	Presented by Russian clubs ( (Russia) Dynamo Moscow)				
1978–79	Shakhtar Donetsk	First round	1–4	(Spain) Barcelona	0–3 at Camp Nou, 1–1 at Donetsk Stadion Lokomotyv
1979–80	Presented by Russian clubs ( (Russia) Dynamo Moscow)				
1980–81	Presented by Georgian clubs ( (Georgia (country)) Dinamo Tbilisi)				
1981–82	Presented by Georgian and Russian clubs ( (Georgia (country)) Dinamo Tbilisi) and ( (Russia) SKA Rostov)				
1982–83	Presented by Russian clubs ( (Russia) Torpedo Moscow)				
1983–84	Shakhtar Donetsk	Quarter-finals	3–4	(Portugal) Porto	2–3 at Estádio das Antas, 1–1 at Tsentralny Stadion Shakhtar
1984–85	Presented by Russian clubs ( (Russia) Dynamo Moscow)				
1985–86	Dynamo Kyiv	Winners	3–0	(Spain) Atlético Madrid	Stade de Gerland
1986–87	Presented by Russian clubs ( (Russia) Torpedo Moscow)				
1987–88	Presented by Belarusian clubs ( (Belarus) Dinamo Minsk)				
1988–89	Metalist Kharkiv	Second round	0–1	(Netherlands) Roda JC	0–1 at Gemeentelijk Sportpark Kaalheide, 0–0 at Kharkiv Stadion Metalist
1989–90	Presented by Russian clubs ( (Russia) Torpedo Moscow)				
1990–91	Dynamo Kyiv	Quarter-finals	3–4	(Spain) Barcelona	2–3 at Respublikanskiy Stadion, 1–1 at Camp Nou
1991–92	Presented by Russian clubs ( (Russia) CSKA Moscow)				
1992–93	Chornomorets Odesa	First round	1–3	(Greece) Olympiacos	1–0 at Karaiskakis Stadium, 0–3 at Tsentralny Stadion ChMP
1993–94	Karpaty Lviv	Qualifying round	2–3	(Republic of Ireland) Shelbourne	1–0 at Stadion Ukrayina, 1–3 at Tolka Park
1994–95	Chornomorets Odesa	First round	1–3	(Switzerland) Grasshopper	0–3 at Hardturm, 1–0 at Tsentralny Stadion ChMP
1995–96	Shakhtar Donetsk	First round	1–2	(Belgium) Club Brugge	0–1 at Jan Breydel Stadium, 1–0 at Tsentralny Stadion Shakhtar
1996–97	Nyva Vinnytsia	First round	0–6	(Switzerland) Sion	0–2 at Stade Tourbillon, 0–4 at Tsentralny Misky Stadion
1997–98	Shakhtar Donetsk	Second round	2–5	(Italy) Vicenza	1–3 at Tsentralny Stadion Shakhtar, 1–2 at Stadio Romeo Menti
1998–99	CSKA Kyiv	First round	1–5	(Russia) Lokomotiv Moscow	0–2 at Stadion Dynamo imeni Valeria Lobanovskoho, 1–3 at Lokomotiv Stadium

=== UEFA Super Cup ===
Ukrainian clubs have won the competition once for the Soviet Union and taken part on two other occasions (only two clubs qualify). In total there are three fixtures featuring Ukrainian clubs.

Year	Club	Progress	Score	Opponents	Venue(s)
1975	Dynamo Kyiv	Winners	3–0	(West Germany) Bayern Munich	1–0 at Olympiastadion, Munich; 2–0 at Tsentralnyi Stadion, Kyiv
1986	Dynamo Kyiv	Runners-up	0–1	(Romania) Steaua București	Stade Louis II, Monte Carlo
2009	Shakhtar Donetsk	Runners-up	0–1 (a.e.t.)	(Spain) Barcelona	Stade Louis II, Monte Carlo

== UEFA Intertoto Cup ==
Year	Team	Progress	Score	Opponents	Venue(s)
1995	Did not participate				
1996	Shakhtar Donetsk	4th in group stage	N/A	(Russia) Rotor Volgograd, (Switzerland) Basel, (Turkey) Antalyaspor, (Belarus) Ataka-Aura Minsk	
1997	Did not participate				
1998	Vorskla Poltava	Third round	2–5	(Netherlands) Fortuna Sittard	0–3 at De Baandert, 2–2 at Stadion Vorskla
1999	Did not participate				
2000	Did not participate				
2001	Tavriya Simferopol	Third round	0–5	(France) Paris Saint-Germain	0–1 at RSC Lokomotyv, 0–4 at Stadium de Toulouse
2002	Did not participate				
2003	Did not participate				
2004	Did not participate				
2005	Did not participate				
2006	Dnipro Dnipropetrovsk	Third round	2–2 (a)	(France) Marseille	0–0 at Stade Parsemain, 2–2 (a) at Stadion Meteor
2007	Chornomorets Odesa	Third round	1–3	(France) Lens	0–0 at Tsentralny Stadion ChMP, 1–3 at Stade Felix Bollaert
2008	Tavriya Simferopol	Third round	1–1 (9–10 p)	(France) Rennais	0–1 at Stade de la Route de Lorient, 1–0 (9–10 p) at RSC Lokomotyv

== Stadiums ==
=== UEFA Champions League / European Cup ===
- Olimpiyskiy National Sports Complex, Kyiv (FC Dynamo Kyiv, 83)
- Stadion Dynamo im.V.Lobanovskoho, Kyiv (FC Dynamo Kyiv, 29)
- Tsentralny Stadion ChMP, Odesa (FC Dynamo Kyiv, 1)
- Stadion Avanhard, Luhansk (FC Zorya Luhansk, 2)
- Stadion Lokomotyv, Simferopol (FC Dynamo Kyiv, 2)
- Stadion Metalist, Kharkiv (FC Dynamo Kyiv, 2)
- Stadion Dinamo im.V.Lenina, Tbilisi (FC Dynamo Kyiv, 1)
- Stadion Metalurh, Kryvyi Rih (FC Dnipro, 3)
- Stadion Meteor, Dnipro (FC Dnipro, 3)
- Stadion Lokomotyv, Simferopol (SC Tavriya Simferopol, 2)
- Tsentralny Stadion Shakhtar, Donetsk (FC Shakhtar Donetsk, 10)
- Regional Sports Complex Olimpiyskiy, Donetsk (FC Shakhtar Donetsk, 20)
- Donbas Arena, Donetsk (FC Shakhtar Donetsk, 15)
- Metalist Oblast Sports Complex, Kharkiv (FC Metalist Kharkiv, 1)
- Arena Lviv, Lviv (FC Shakhtar Donetsk, 10)
- Metalist Oblast Sports Complex, Kharkiv (FC Shakhtar Donetsk, 6)

=== UEFA Europa League / UEFA Cup ===
- Olimpiyskiy National Sports Complex, Kyiv (FC Dynamo Kyiv, 35)
- Tsentralny Stadion ChMP, Odesa (FC Chornomorets Odesa, 12)
- Tsentralny Stadion Shakhtar, Donetsk (FC Shakhtar Donetsk, 12)
- Regional Sports Complex Olimpiyskiy, Donetsk (FC Shakhtar Donetsk, 15)
- Stadion Dynamo im.V.Lobanovskoho, Kyiv (FC Dynamo Kyiv, 18)
- Stadion Metalurh, Kryvyi Rih (FC Dnipro, 6)
- Stadion Meteor, Dnipro (FC Dnipro, 23)
- Stadion Vorskla, Poltava (FC Vorskla Poltava, 15)
- Stadion Ukrayina, Lviv (FC Karpaty Lviv, 9)
- Stadion Metalurh, Kryvyi Rih (FC Kryvbas Kryvyi Rih, 1)
- Stadion Dynamo im.V.Lobanovskoho, Kyiv (FC Arsenal Kyiv, 4)
- Stadion Meteor, Dnipro (FC Metalurh Zaporizhya, 2)
- Tsentralny Stadion Shakhtar, Donetsk (FC Metalurh Donetsk, 4)
- Regional Sports Complex Olimpiyskiy, Donetsk (FC Metalurh Donetsk, 1)
- Stadion im.V.Boiko, Mariupol (FC Mariupol, 2)
- Slavutych-Arena, Zaporizhzhia (FC Metalurh Zaporizhya, 2)
- Oblast Sports Complex Metalist, Kharkiv (FC Metalist Kharkiv, 25)
- Stadion Metalurh, Donetsk (FC Metalurh Donetsk, 6)
- Donbas Arena, Donetsk (FC Shakhtar Donetsk, 4)
- Dnipro-Arena, Dnipro (FC Dnipro, 16)
- Lokomotyv Republican Sports Complex, Simferopol, (SC Tavriya Simferopol, 1)
- Stadion Chornomorets, Odesa (FC Chornomorets Odesa, 8)
- GSP Stadium, Nicosia (FC Dynamo Kyiv, 1)
- Obolon Arena, Kyiv (FC Zorya Luhansk, 1)
- Stadion Dynamo im.V.Lobanovskoho, Kyiv (FC Zorya Luhansk, 4)
- Olimpiyskiy National Sports Complex, Kyiv (FC Dnipro, 8)
- Olimpiyskiy National Sports Complex, Kyiv (FC Metalist Kharkiv, 1)
- Stadion Dynamo im.V.Lobanovskoho, Kyiv (FC Metalist Kharkiv, 1)
- Arena Lviv, Lviv (FC Metalist Kharkiv, 2)
- Arena Lviv, Lviv (FC Shakhtar Donetsk, 8)
- Cultural and Sports Complex Nika, Oleksandriia (FC Oleksandriya, 3)
- Stadion Chornomorets, Odesa (FC Zorya Luhansk, 3)
- Oblast Sports Complex Metalist, Kharkiv (FC Shakhtar Donetsk, 2)
- Stadion Dynamo im.V.Lobanovskoho, Kyiv (FC Olimpik Donetsk, 1)
- Arena Lviv, Lviv (FC Zorya Luhansk, 3)
- Stadion Chornomorets, Odesa (FC Mariupol, 2)
- Slavutych-Arena, Zaporizhzhia (FC Zorya Luhansk, 2)
- Olimpiyskiy National Sports Complex, Kyiv (FC Vorskla Poltava, 1)

=== UEFA Cup Winners' Cup ===
- Olimpiyskiy National Sports Complex, Kyiv (FC Dynamo Kyiv, 13)
- Stadion Dinamo im.V.Lenina, Tbilisi (FC Dynamo Kyiv, 1)
- Stadion Ukrayina, Lviv (FC Karpaty Lviv, 2)
- Stadion Lokomotyv, Donetsk (FC Shakhtar Donetsk, 1)
- Tsentralny Stadion Shakhtar, Donetsk (FC Shakhtar Donetsk, 8)
- Stadion Metalist, Kharkiv (FC Metalist Kharkiv, 2)
- Tsentralny Stadion ChMP, Odesa (FC Chornomorets Odesa, 3)
- Tsentralny Misky Stadion, Vinnytsia (FC Nyva Vinnytsia, 2)
- Stadion Dynamo, Kyiv (FC CSKA Kyiv, 2)

=== UEFA Intertoto Cup ===
- Tsentralny Stadion Shakhtar, Donetsk (FC Shakhtar Donetsk, 2)
- Stadion Vorskla, Poltava (FC Vorskla Poltava, 3)
- Stadion Lokomotyv, Simferopol (SC Tavriya Simferopol, 4)
- Stadion Meteor, Dnipro (FC Dnipro, 2)
- Tsentralny Stadion ChMP, Odesa (FC Chornomorets Odesa, 2)

== Women's football ==
Teams first appearances in the European competitions:

Lehenda-ShVSM Chernihiv (2001), Arsenal/Metalist Kharkiv (2004), Metalist 1925/Zhytlobud-1 Kharkiv (2007), Naftokhimik Kalush (2008), Vorskla/Zhytlobud-2 Poltava (2017), Kryvbas Kryvyi Rih (2023), Kolos Kovalivka (2024), Seasters Odesa (2026)

As of 31 December 2023

#	Team	Pop. place	S	GP	W	D	L	GS	GA	GD	Pts	Notes
1.	Metalist 1925	Kharkiv	10	38	21	2	15	105	70	+35	65	
2.	Vorskla	Poltava	4	15	8	2	5	39	19	+20	26	
3.	Lehenda-ShVSM	Chernihiv	5	17	8	1	8	35	25	+10	25	
4.	Arsenal	Kharkiv	2	6	4	0	2	38	10	+28	12	
5.	Naftokhimik	Kalush	1	6	3	0	3	7	15	-8	9	
6.	Kryvbas	Kryvyi Rih	1	2	0	0	2	0	7	-7	0	

== UEFA Women's Champions League/UEFA Women's Cup ==
Year	Team	Progress	Score	Opponents	Venue(s)
2001–02	Lehenda-Cheksil Chernihiv	2nd in group stage second qualifying round	N/A	(France) Toulouse; (Scotland) Ayr United; (Croatia) Osijek	0-1 at Somerset Park, Ayr; 1-1 at Somerset Park, Ayr; 3-2 at Dam Park, Ayr
2002–03	None entered				
2003–04	Lehenda-Cheksil Chernihiv	2nd in group stage second qualifying round	N/A	(Israel) Maccabi Holon; (Finland) United; (Sweden) Malmö FF Dam	4-0 at imeni Yuriya Gagarina, Chernihiv; 2-0 at imeni Yuriya Gagarina, Chernihiv; 0-3 at imeni Yuriya Gagarina, Chernihiv
2004–05	Metalist Kharkiv	2nd in group stage first qualifying round	N/A	(Faroe Islands) KÍ Klaksvík; (Wales) Cardiff City Ladies; (Poland) AZS Wrocław	2-1 at Wrocław; 8-1 at Wrocław; 0-2 at Wrocław
2005–06	Arsenal Kharkiv	2nd in group stage first qualifying round	N/A	(Poland) AZS Wrocław; (Israel) Maccabi Holon; (Cyprus) AEK Kokkinochorion	0-5 at Wrocław; 8-1 at Wrocław; 20-0 at Wrocław
2006–07	Lehenda-Cheksil Chernihiv	4th in group stage second qualifying round	N/A	(Sweden) Umeå; (Norway) Kolbotn; (Spain) Espanyol	0-2 at Kolbotn; 1-2 at Kolbotn; 0-5 at Kolbotn
2007–08	Zhytlobud-1 Kharkiv	2nd in group stage first qualifying round	N/A	(Georgia (country)) Dinamo Tbilisi; (Serbia) Napredak Kruševac; (Russia) Rossiyanka	14-0 at Krasnoarmeysk; 4-2 at Krasnoarmeysk; 0-3 at Krasnoarmeysk
2008–09	Naftokhimik Kalush	4th in group stage second qualifying round	N/A	(Germany) Duisburg; (Denmark) Brøndby; (Spain) Levante	1-5 at Khimik Stadium, Kalush; 1-5 at Khimik Stadium, Kalush; 1-4 at Khimik Stadium, Kalush
2009–10	Zhytlobud-1 Kharkiv	Round of 32	0–11	(Sweden) Umeå	0–5 at Helios Arena, Kharkiv; 0–6 at Umeå
2010–11	Lehenda-ShVSM Chernihiv	Round of 32	1–7	(Russia) Rossiyanka	1–3 at imeni Yuriya Gagarina, Chernihiv; 0–4 at Krasnoarmeysk
2011–12	Lehenda-ShVSM Chernihiv	2nd in group stage qualifying round	N/A	(Wales) Swansea City; (Luxembourg) Progrès Niederkorn; (Cyprus) Apollon Limassol	2-0 at Limassol; 8-0 at Limassol; 1-2 at Limassol
2012–13	Zhytlobud-1 Kharkiv	2nd in group stage qualifying round	N/A	(Albania) Ada Velipojë; (Faroe Islands) KÍ Klaksvík; (Cyprus) Apollon Limassol	14-1 at Limassol; 2-1 at Limassol; 0-3 at Limassol
2013–14	Zhytlobud-1 Kharkiv	2nd in group stage qualifying round	N/A	(Northern Ireland) Crusaders Strikers; (Republic of Ireland) Raheny United; (Hungary) MTK	5-0 at Seaview, Belfast; 2-1 at Seaview, Belfast; 0-1 at Solitude, Belfast
2014–15	Zhytlobud-1 Kharkiv	2nd in group stage qualifying round	N/A	(Northern Ireland) Glentoran Belfast United; (Slovakia) Nové Zámky; (Scotland) Glasgow City	5-0 at Falkirk Stadium, Falkirk; 3-1 at Excelsior Stadium, Airdrie; 0-4 at Excelsior Stadium, Airdrie
2015–16	Zhytlobud-1 Kharkiv	2nd in group stage qualifying round	N/A	(Latvia) Rīgas FS; (Slovakia) Nové Zámky; (Finland) PK-35 Vantaa	4-1 at ISS Stadion, Vantaa; 5-0 at ISS Stadion, Vantaa; 1-2 at ISS Stadion, Vantaa
2016–17	Zhytlobud-1 Kharkiv	3rd in group stage qualifying round	N/A	(Latvia) Rīgas FS; (Israel) Ramat HaSharon; (Bosnia and Herzegovina) SFK 2000	2-0 at Stadion Otoka, Sarajevo; 0-1 at Stadion Otoka, Sarajevo; 2-2 at Asim Ferhatović Hase Stadium, Sarajevo
2017–18	Zhytlobud-2 Kharkiv	3rd in group stage qualifying round	N/A	(Romania) Olimpia Cluj; (Scotland) Hibernian; (Wales) Swansea City	0-1 at Cluj Arena, Cluj-Napoca; 1-1 at Cluj Arena, Cluj-Napoca; 9-0 at Stadionul Clujana, Cluj-Napoca
2018–19	Zhytlobud-1 Kharkiv	Round of 32	1–10	(Sweden) Linköpings	1–6 at Metalist OSC, Kharkiv; 0–4 at Linköping Arena, Linköping
2019–20	Zhytlobud-1 Kharkiv	2nd in group stage qualifying round	N/A	(Croatia) Split; (Luxembourg) Bettembourg; (Belarus) Minsk	3-2 at FC Metalist Training Ground, Vysokyi; 6-0 at FC Metalist Training Ground, Vysokyi; 0-2 at Metalist OSC, Kharkiv
2020–21	Zhytlobud-2 Kharkiv	Round of 32	2–2 (a)	(Kazakhstan) BIIK Kazygurt	2–1 at Oleksiy Butovsky Vorskla Stadium, Poltava; 0–1 at Namyz Stadium, Shymkent
2021–22	Zhytlobud-1 Kharkiv	3rd in group stage	N/A	(France) Paris Saint-Germain; (Spain) Real Madrid; (Iceland) Breiðablik	0–5 at Stade Jean-Bouin, 0–6 at Metalist OSC; 0–1 at Metalist OSC, 0–3 at Alfredo Di Stéfano; 0–0 at Metalist OSC, 2–0 at Kópavogsvöllur
2022–23	Vorskla Poltava	Qualifying round 2	2–3	(Albania) Vllaznia	1–1 at Loro Boriçi Stadium, Shkodër; 1–2 at Loro Boriçi Stadium, Shkodër
2023–24	Vorskla Poltava	Qualifying round 2	1–9	(Italy) Roma	0–3 at Stadio Tre Fontane, Rome; 1–6 at Stadio Tre Fontane, Rome
2023–24	Kryvbas Kryvyi Rih	Qualifying round 1	0–4	(France) Paris FC	Linköping Arena, Linköping
2023–24	Kryvbas Kryvyi Rih	Qualifying round 1	0–3	(Sweden) Linköping	Linköping Arena, Linköping
2024–25	Vorskla Poltava	Qualifying round 2	0–3	(Scotland) Celtic	0–1 at Excelsior Stadium, Airdrie; 0–2 at Excelsior Stadium, Airdrie
2024–25	Kolos Kovalivka	Qualifying round 1	1–4 (a.e.t.)	(Netherlands) Ajax	Brøndby Stadium, Brøndbyvester
2024–25	Kolos Kovalivka	Qualifying round 1	1–2	(Denmark) Brøndby	Brøndby Stadium, Brøndbyvester
2025–26	Vorskla Poltava	Qualifying round 3 (Transfer to WEC)	0–2	(Belgium) OH Leuven	0–2 at Den Dreef, Leuven; 0–0 at Den Dreef, Leuven
2025–26	Metalist 1925 Kharkiv	Qualifying round 2	4–5	(Sweden) Hammarby IF	Stockholm Arena, Stockholm
2025–26	Metalist 1925 Kharkiv	Qualifying round 2	0–2	(Netherlands) PSV Eindhoven	Stockholm Arena, Stockholm
2026–27	Metalist 1925 Kharkiv				
2026–27	Seasters Odesa				

== UEFA Women's Europa Cup ==
Year	Team	Progress	Score	Opponents	Venue(s)
2025–26	Vorskla Poltava	Qualifying round 2	1–2	(Denmark) Fortuna Hjørring	1–1 at Hjørring Stadium, Hjørring; 0–1 at Hjørring Stadium, Hjørring
2025–26	Kolos Kovalivka	Qualifying round 1	0–4	(Albania) Vllaznia	0–2 at Loro Boriçi Stadium, Shkodër; 0–2 at Loro Boriçi Stadium, Shkodër
2026–27	Kolos Kovalivka				

== Statistics by club ==
- FC Dynamo Kyiv in European football
- FC Shakhtar Donetsk in European football
- FC Dnipro in European football
- FC Metalurh Donetsk in European football
- FC Zorya Luhansk in European football
