= FC Zorya Luhansk in European football =

Ukrainian club in European football

- Club: Zorya Luhansk
- First entry: 1973–74 European Cup
- Latest entry: 2023–24 UEFA Europa Conference League

Its first European competition participation occurred in 1973–74 season in UEFA European Cup as the Soviet representative. Zorya played its first game as Zaria at its home stadium Zaporizhzhya City Stadium on September 20, 1973, hosting the Cypriot club APOEL and winning 2-0. After that season, the club did not participate in continental competitions for over 40 years until 2014–15 season.

== Statistics by country ==
Country	Club	P	W	D	L	GF	GA	GD
Albania	Laçi	2	2	0	0	5	1	+4
Subtotal		2	2	0	0	5	1	+4
Austria	Rapid	2	0	0	2	2	6	–4
Subtotal		2	0	0	2	2	6	–4
Belgium	Charleroi	2	2	0	0	5	0	+5
Subtotal		2	2	0	0	5	0	+5
Bulgaria	CSKA Sofia	4	3	1	0	5	1	+4
Subtotal		4	3	1	0	5	1	+4
Cyprus	APOEL	2	2	0	0	3	0	+3
Subtotal		2	2	0	0	3	0	+3
England	Leicester City	2	1	0	1	1	3	–2
England	Manchester United	2	0	0	2	0	3	–3
Subtotal		4	1	0	3	1	6	–5
Germany	Hertha BSC	2	1	0	1	2	3	–1
Germany	RB Leipzig	2	0	1	1	2	3	–1
Subtotal		4	1	1	2	4	6	–2
Greece	AEK Athens	2	1	0	1	4	4	0
Subtotal		2	1	0	1	4	4	0
Italy	Roma	2	0	0	2	0	7	–7
Subtotal		2	0	0	2	0	7	–7
Montenegro	Budućnost Podgorica	2	2	0	0	4	1	+3
Subtotal		2	2	0	0	4	1	+3
Netherlands	Feyenoord	4	0	2	2	5	7	–2
Subtotal		4	0	2	2	5	7	–2
Norway	Molde	2	1	1	0	3	2	+1
Norway	Bodø/Glimt	2	0	1	1	2	4	–2
Subtotal		4	1	2	1	5	6	–1
Poland	Legia Warsaw	2	0	0	2	2	4	–2
Subtotal		2	0	0	2	2	4	–2
Portugal	Braga	4	0	2	2	4	7	–3
Subtotal		4	0	2	2	4	7	–3
Slovakia	Spartak Trnava	2	0	1	1	0	1	–1
Subtotal		2	0	1	1	0	1	–1
Spain	Athletic Bilbao	2	1	0	1	1	2	–1
Spain	Espanyol	2	0	1	1	3	5	–2
Subtotal		4	1	1	2	4	7	–3
Sweden	Östersund	2	0	0	2	0	4	–4
Subtotal		2	0	0	2	0	4	–4
Turkey	Fenerbahçe	2	0	1	1	1	3	–2
Subtotal		2	0	1	1	1	3	–2

== Tally per competition ==
Tournament	Pld	W	D	L	GF	GA
European Cup	4	2	1	1	3	1
Europa League	40	12	9	19	46	59
Europa Conference League	6	2	1	3	5	11
Total	50	16	11	23	54	71

== Results ==
Season	Competition	Round	Opponent	Home/Neitral	Away	Aggregate	Qual.
1973–74	European Cup	1R	(Cyprus) APOEL	2–0	1–0	3–0	
1973–74	European Cup	2R	(Czechoslovakia) Spartak Trnava	0–1	0–0	0–1	
2014–15	UEFA Europa League	2Q	(Albania) Laçi	2–1	3–0	5–1	
2014–15	UEFA Europa League	3Q	(Norway) Molde	1–1	2–1	3–2	
2014–15	UEFA Europa League	PO	(Netherlands) Feyenoord	1–1	3–4	4–5	
2015–16	UEFA Europa League	3Q	(Belgium) Charleroi	3–0	2–0	5–0	
2015–16	UEFA Europa League	PO	(Poland) Legia Warsaw	0–1	2–3	2–4	
2016–17	UEFA Europa League	Group A	(England) Manchester United	0–2	0–1	4th	
2016–17	UEFA Europa League	Group A	(Turkey) Fenerbahçe	1–1	0–2	4th	
2016–17	UEFA Europa League	Group A	(Netherlands) Feyenoord	1–1	0–1	4th	
2017–18	UEFA Europa League	Group J	(Spain) Athletic Bilbao	0–2	1–0	3rd	
2017–18	UEFA Europa League	Group J	(Germany) Hertha	2–1	0–2	3rd	
2017–18	UEFA Europa League	Group J	(Sweden) Östersund	0–2	0–2	3rd	
2018–19	UEFA Europa League	3Q	(Portugal) Braga	1–1	2–2	3–3	
2018–19	UEFA Europa League	PO	(Germany) Leipzig	0–0	2–3	2–3	
2019–20	UEFA Europa League	2Q	(Montenegro) Budućnost Podgorica	1–0	3–1	4–1	
2019–20	UEFA Europa League	3Q	(Bulgaria) CSKA Sofia	1–0	1–1	2–1	
2019–20	UEFA Europa League	PO	(Spain) Espanyol	2–2	1–3	3–5	
2020–21	UEFA Europa League	Group G	(Portugal) Braga	1–2	0–2	3rd	
2020–21	UEFA Europa League	Group G	(England) Leicester City	1–0	0–3	3rd	
2020–21	UEFA Europa League	Group G	(Greece) AEK Athens	1–4	3–0	3rd	
2021–22	UEFA Europa League	PO	(Austria) Rapid Wien	2–3	0–3	2–6	
2021–22	UEFA Europa Conference League	Group C	(Italy) Roma	0–3	0–4	3rd	
2021–22	UEFA Europa Conference League	Group C	(Bulgaria) CSKA Sofia	2–0	1–0	3rd	
2021–22	UEFA Europa Conference League	Group C	(Norway) Bodø/Glimt	1–1	1–3	3rd	
2022–23	UEFA Europa Conference League	3Q	(Romania) Universitatea Craiova	1–0 Lb	0–3	1–3	
2023–24	UEFA Europa League	PO	(Czech Republic) Slavia Prague	2–1 Lb	0–2	2–3	
2023–24	UEFA Europa Conference League	Group B	(Belgium) Gent	1–1 Lb	1–4	3rd	
2023–24	UEFA Europa Conference League	Group B	(Israel) Maccabi Tel Aviv	1–3 Lb	2–3	3rd	
2023–24	UEFA Europa Conference League	Group B	(Iceland) Breiðablik	4–0 Lb	1–0	3rd	

Notes

- 1R: First round
- 2R: Second round
- 2Q: Second qualifying round
- 3Q: Third qualifying round
- PO: Play-off round

Neitral matches in: Lb - Lublin, Poland.
