= FC Dnipro in European football =

Ukrainian club in European football

- Club: FC Dnipro
- First entry: 1984–85 European Cup
- Latest entry: 2014–15 UEFA Champions League

This is a list of matches of FC Dnipro in European competitions. Between 1965 (Soviet Union teams debuted in Europe) and 2019, 20 times Dnipro qualified for the European continental club competitions and once reached a final (2015) when it was defeated by the Spanish team of Sevilla in Warsaw.

Dnipro made its debut in 1985 as the winner of the 1983 Soviet Top League and qualifying to the 1984–85 European Cup. It managed to defeat the Turkish champions Trabzonspor on aggregate. That season it reached quarterfinals and were defeated by the French champions Bordeaux on penalties after both matches were tied at 1.

Due to direct sanctions from FIFA, for refusing to pay salary to coaching and playing staff, at first Dnipro was denied license of play in European competition by placing third in the 2015–16 season and then in the season of 2016–17 it was forced into relegation by administrative measures from the Ukrainian Association of Football (at that time Football Federation of Ukraine) all the way to amateur competitions and after couple of seasons were disbanded by its owners (Ihor Kolomoiskyi and his Privat Group).

In 2017 a similar club from the same city SC Dnipro-1 was established supposedly by different people and officially has no relations to the club established in the Soviet Union.

== Tallies balance ==
Country	Club	Pld	W	D	L	GF	GA	GD
Armenia	Yerevan	2	2	0	0	8	2	+6
Armenia	Banants	2	2	0	0	8	2	+6
Subtotal		4	4	0	0	16	4	+12
Austria	Tirol Innbruck	2	1	1	0	4	2	+2
Austria	Admira Wacker	2	2	0	0	4	2	+2
Austria	Austria Wien	1	1	0	0	1	0	+1
Subtotal		5	4	1	0	9	4	+5
Azerbaijan	Qarabağ	2	1	0	1	2	2	+0
Subtotal		2	1	0	1	2	2	+0
Belgium	Club Brugge	3	2	1	0	4	2	+2
Subtotal		3	2	1	0	4	2	+2
Bulgaria	Levski Sofia	2	1	0	1	3	3	+0
Bulgaria	Litex Lovech	1	0	0	1	0	2	-2
Subtotal		3	1	0	2	3	5	-2
Croatia	Hajduk Split	4	1	1	2	2	4	-2
Croatia	Dinamo Zagreb	2	1	1	0	3	1	+2
Subtotal		6	2	2	2	5	5	+0
Czech Republic	Slovan Liberec	2	1	1	0	6	4	+2
Subtotal		2	1	1	0	6	4	+2
Denmark	Copenhagen	2	0	1	1	0	2	-2
Subtotal		2	0	1	1	0	2	-2
East Germany	Wismut Aue	2	2	0	0	5	2	+3
Subtotal		2	2	0	0	5	2	+3
England	Middlesbrough	1	0	0	1	0	3	-3
England	Fulham	2	1	0	1	1	3	-2
England	Tottenham	2	1	0	1	2	3	-1
Subtotal		5	2	0	3	3	9	-6
Estonia	Nõmme Kalju	2	2	0	0	5	1	+4
Subtotal		2	2	0	0	5	1	+4
France	Bordeaux	4	0	3	1	4	5	-1
France	Marseille	4	0	3	1	2	3	-1
France	Saint-Étienne	4	1	1	2	1	4	-3
Subtotal		12	1	7	4	7	12	-5
Germany	Wismut Aue	2	2	0	0	5	2	+3
Germany	Eintracht Frankfurt	2	1	0	1	1	2	-1
Germany	HSV	2	1	0	1	4	2	+2
Subtotal		6	4	0	2	10	6	+4
Greece	Olympiacos	2	1	1	0	4	2	+2
Subtotal		2	1	1	0	4	2	+2
Israel	Maccabi Haifa	2	1	0	1	2	1	+1
Subtotal		2	1	0	1	2	1	+1
Italy	Fiorentina	4	0	1	3	3	6	-3
Italy	Napoli	4	2	1	1	7	6	+1
Italy	Inter Milan	2	0	0	2	1	3	-2
Italy	Lazio	2	0	1	1	2	4	-2
Subtotal		12	2	3	7	13	19	-6
Liechtenstein	Vaduz	2	2	0	0	2	0	+2
Subtotal		2	2	0	0	2	0	+2
Netherlands	PSV	4	3	1	0	7	3	+4
Netherlands	Utrecht	1	1	0	0	2	1	+1
Netherlands	AZ Alkmaar	1	0	0	1	1	2	-1
Netherlands	Ajax	2	1	0	1	2	2	+0
Subtotal		8	5	1	2	12	8	+4
Northern Ireland	Linfield	2	2	0	0	3	1	+2
Subtotal		2	2	0	0	3	1	+2
Norway	Rosenborg	2	2	0	0	4	0	+4
Subtotal		2	2	0	0	4	0	+4
Poland	Legia Warsaw	2	0	1	1	0	1	-1
Poland	GKS Bełchatów	2	1	1	0	5	3	+2
Poland	Lech Poznań	2	0	1	1	0	1	-1
Subtotal		6	1	3	2	5	5	+0
Portugal	Benfica	2	0	0	2	0	4	-4
Portugal	Paços Ferreira	2	2	0	0	4	0	+4
Subtotal		4	2	0	2	4	4	+0
Romania	Pandurii Târgu Jiu	2	2	0	0	5	1	+4
Subtotal		2	2	0	0	5	1	+4
Russia	Alania Vladikavkaz	2	0	0	2	2	6	-4
Subtotal		2	0	0	2	2	6	-4
Scotland	Heart of Midlothian	2	0	1	1	2	4	-2
Scotland	Hibernian	2	1	1	0	5	1	+4
Scotland	Aberdeen	2	0	2	0	1	1	+0
Subtotal		6	1	4	1	8	6	+2
Serbia	Partizan	2	0	1	1	2	3	-1
Serbia	Spartak Subotica	2	1	0	1	3	2	+1
Subtotal		4	1	1	2	5	5	+0
Slovakia	MFK Petržalka	2	1	1	0	4	1	+3
Slovakia	Nitra	2	1	0	1	3	2	+1
Subtotal		4	2	1	1	7	3	+4
Spain	Real Zaragoza	1	0	0	1	1	2	-1
Spain	Sevilla	1	0	0	1	2	3	-1
Subtotal		2	0	0	2	3	5	-2
Sweden	AIK	2	2	0	0	7	2	+5
Subtotal		2	2	0	0	7	2	+5
Switzerland	Grasshoppers	1	1	0	0	3	2	+1
Switzerland	AC Bellinzona	2	1	0	1	4	4	+0
Switzerland	Basel	2	0	1	1	1	3	-2
Subtotal		5	2	1	2	8	9	-1
Turkey	Trabzonspor	2	1	0	1	3	1	+2
Subtotal		2	1	0	1	3	1	+1
Yugoslavia	Hajduk Split	2	0	0	2	0	3	-3
Subtotal		2	0	0	2	0	3	-3

== Overall ==
Season	Competition	Round	Opponent	Home	Away	Aggregate
1984–85	European Cup	First round	(Turkey) Trabzonspor	3–0	0–1	3–1
1984–85	European Cup	Second round	(Bulgaria) Levski Sofia	2–0	1–3	3–3
1984–85	European Cup	Quarter-final	(France) Bordeaux	1–1	1–1	3–5 (p)
1985–86	UEFA Cup	First round	(East Germany) Wismut Aue	2–1	3–1	5–2
1985–86	UEFA Cup	Second round	(Netherlands) PSV	1–0	2–2	3–2
1985–86	UEFA Cup	Third round	(Socialist Federal Republic of Yugoslavia) Hajduk Split	0–1	0–2	0–3
1986–87	UEFA Cup	First round	(Poland) Legia Warsaw	0–0	0–1	0–1
1988–89	UEFA Cup	First round	(France) Bordeaux	1–1	1–2	2–3
1989–90	European Cup	First round	(Northern Ireland) Linfield	2–1	1–0	3–1
1989–90	European Cup	Second round	(Austria) Tirol Innbruck	2–0	2–2	4–2
1989–90	European Cup	Quarter-final	(Portugal) Benfica	0–1	0–3	0–4
1990–91	UEFA Cup	First round	(Scotland) Heart of Midlothian	1–1	1–3	2–4
1993–94	UEFA Cup	First round	(Austria) Admira Wacker	1–0	3–2	4–2
1993–94	UEFA Cup	Second round	(Germany) Eintracht Frankfurt	1–0	0–2	1–2
1997–98	UEFA Cup	First qualifying round	(Armenia) Yerevan	6–1	2–0	8–2
1997–98	UEFA Cup	Second qualifying round	(Russia) Alania Vladikavkaz	1–2	1–4	2–6
2001–02	UEFA Cup	First round	(Italy) Fiorentina	0–0	1–2	1–2
2003–04	UEFA Cup	First qualifying round	(Liechtenstein) Vaduz	1–0	1–0	2–0
2003–04	UEFA Cup	Second qualifying round	(Germany) HSV	3–0	1–2	4–2
2003–04	UEFA Cup	Second round	(Croatia) Dinamo Zagreb	1–1	2–0	3–1
2003–04	UEFA Cup	Third round	(France) Marseille	0–0	0–1	0–1
2004–05	UEFA Cup	Second qualifying round	(Slovakia) MFK Petržalka	3–0	1–1	4–1
2004–05	UEFA Cup	First round	(Israel) Maccabi Haifa	2–0	0–1	2–1
2004–05	UEFA Cup	Group C	(Belgium) Club Brugge	3–2		1st
2004–05	UEFA Cup	Group C	(Netherlands) Utrecht		2–1	1st
2004–05	UEFA Cup	Group C	Austria Wien	1–0		1st
2004–05	UEFA Cup	Group C	(Spain) Real Zaragoza		1–2	1st
2004–05	UEFA Cup	Round of 32	(Serbia) Partizan	0–1	2–2	2–3
2005–06	UEFA Cup	Second qualifying round	(Armenia) Banants	4–0	4–2	8–2
2005–06	UEFA Cup	First round	(Scotland) Hibernian	5–1	0–0	5–1
2005–06	UEFA Cup	Group D	(Netherlands) AZ Alkmaar	1–2		4th
2005–06	UEFA Cup	Group D	(England) Middlesbrough		0–3	4th
2005–06	UEFA Cup	Group D	(Bulgaria) Litex Lovech	0–2		4th
2005–06	UEFA Cup	Group D	(Switzerland) Grasshoppers		3–2	4th
2006	UEFA Intertoto Cup	Second round	(Slovakia) Nitra	2–0	1–2	3–2
2006	UEFA Intertoto Cup	Third round	(France) Marseille	2–2	0–0	2–2
2007–08	UEFA Cup	Second qualifying round	(Poland) GKS Bełchatów	1–1	4–2	5–3
2007–08	UEFA Cup	First round	(Scotland) Aberdeen	1–1	0–0	1–1
2008–09	UEFA Cup	Second qualyifing round	(Switzerland) AC Bellinzona	3–2	1–2	4–4
2010–11	UEFA Europa League	Third qualyifing round	(Serbia) Spartak Subotica	2–0	1–2	3–2
2010–11	UEFA Europa League	Play-off	(Poland) Lech Poznań	0–1	0–0	0–1
2011–12	UEFA Europa League	Play-off	(England) Fulham	1–0	0–3	1–3
2012–13	UEFA Europa League	Play-off	(Czech Republic) Slovan Liberec	4–2	2–2	6–4
2012–13	UEFA Europa League	Group F	(Netherlands) PSV	2–0	2–1	1st
2012–13	UEFA Europa League	Group F	(Italy) Napoli	3–1	2–4	1st
2012–13	UEFA Europa League	Group F	(Sweden) AIK	4–0	3–2	1st
2012–13	UEFA Europa League	Round of 32	(Switzerland) Basel	1–1	0–2	1–3
2013–14	UEFA Europa League	Play-off	(Estonia) Nomme Kalju	2–0	3–1	5–1
2013–14	UEFA Europa League	Group E	(Italy) Fiorentina	1–2	1–2	2nd
2013–14	UEFA Europa League	Group E	(Portugal) Paços Ferreira	2–0	2–0	2nd
2013–14	UEFA Europa League	Group E	(Romania) Pandurii Târgu Jiu	4–1	1–0	2nd
2013–14	UEFA Europa League	Round of 32	(England) Tottenham	1–0	1–3	2–3
2014–15	UEFA Champions League	Third qualifying round	(Denmark) Copenhagen	0–0	0–2	0–2
2014–15	UEFA Europa League	Play-off	(Croatia) Hajduk Split	2–1	0–0	2–1
2014–15	UEFA Europa League	Group F	(Italy) Inter Milan	0–1	1–2	2nd
2014–15	UEFA Europa League	Group F	(France) Saint-Étienne	1–0	0–0	2nd
2014–15	UEFA Europa League	Group F	(Azerbaijan) Qarabağ	0–1	2–1	2nd
2014–15	UEFA Europa League	Round of 32	(Greece) Olympiacos	2–0	2–2	4–2
2014–15	UEFA Europa League	Round of 16	(Netherlands) Ajax	1–0	1–2	2–2 (a)
2014–15	UEFA Europa League	Quarter-final	(Belgium) Club Brugge	1–0	0–0	1–0
2014–15	UEFA Europa League	Semi-final	(Italy) Napoli	1–0	1–1	2–1
2014–15	UEFA Europa League	Final	(Spain) Sevilla	2–3		Runner-up
2015–16	UEFA Europa League	Group G	(Italy) Lazio	1–1	1–3	3rd
2015–16	UEFA Europa League	Group G	(France) Saint-Étienne	0–1	0–3	3rd
2015–16	UEFA Europa League	Group G	(Norway) Rosenborg	3–0	1–0	3rd

== Finals ==
Year	Competition	Opposing Team	Score	Venue
2015	UEFA Europa League	(Spain) Sevilla	2–3	(Poland) Stadion Narodowy, Warsaw

=== Won semi-finals ===
Year	Competition	Opposing Team	Score	Final venue	Other Semi-finalists
2015	UEFA Europa League	(Italy) Napoli	1–0 (H); 1–1 (A)	Olympic Stadium (H); Stadio San Paolo (A)	(Spain) Sevilla (Italy) Fiorentina

=== Won quarter-finals ===
Year	Competition	Opposing Team	Score	Final venue
2015	UEFA Europa League	(Belgium) Club Brugge	1–0 (H); 0–0 (A)	Olympic Stadium (H); Jan Breydel Stadium (A)

=== Lost quarter-finals ===
Year	Competition	Opposing Team	Score	Final venue
1985	European Cup	(France) Bordeaux	1–1 (H); 1–1 (A)	Stadium Meteor (H); Stade Bordeaux-Atlantique (A)
1990	European Cup	(Portugal) Benfica	0–3 (H); 0–1 (A)	Stadium Meteor (H); Estádio da Luz (A)

== European performances ==
Season	Achievement	Notes
European Cup / UEFA Champions League
1984–85	Quarter-finalist	eliminated by (France) Bordeaux 1–1 in Bordeaux, 1–1 in Dnipropetrovsk
1989–90	Quarter-finalist	eliminated by (Portugal) Benfica 0–1 in Lisbon, 0–3 in Dnipropetrovsk
UEFA Cup / UEFA Europa League
2014–15	Runners-up	defeated by (Spain) Sevilla 2–3 in Warsaw

=== Overall record ===
European Cup / UEFA Champions League
Season	Preliminary stages			Round of 32	Round of 16	Quarter-finals	Semi-finals	Final
1984–85				(Turkey) Trabzonspor	(Bulgaria) Levski Sofia	(France) Bordeaux		
1989–90				(Northern Ireland) Linfield	(Austria) Tirol	(Portugal) Benfica		
2014–15		(Denmark) Copenhagen						
Inter-Cities Fairs Cup / UEFA Cup / UEFA Europa League
Season	Preliminary stages			Round of 32	Round of 16	Quarter-finals	Semi-finals	Final
1985–86			(East Germany) Wismut	(Netherlands) PSV	(Socialist Federal Republic of Yugoslavia) Hajduk S.			
1986–87			(Poland) Legia					
1988–89			(France) Bordeaux					
1990–91			(Scotland) Heart of Midlothian					
1993–94			(Austria) Admira Wacker	(Germany) Eintracht F.				
1997–98	(Armenia) Yerevan	(Russia) Alania						
2001–02		(Italy) Fiorentina						
2003–04	(Liechtenstein) Vaduz	(Germany) Hamburg	(Croatia) Dinamo	(France) Marseille				
2004–05	(Slovakia) Petržalka	(Israel) Maccabi H.	(Belgium) Brugge ^{1}	(Serbia and Montenegro) Partizan				
2005–06	(Armenia) Banants	(Scotland) Hibernian	(Bulgaria) Litex ^{1}					
2007–08	(Poland) Bełchatów	(Scotland) Aberdeen						
2008–09	(Switzerland) Bellinzona							
2010–11	(Serbia) Spartak Z.V.	(Poland) Lech						
2011–12		(England) Fulham						
2011–12		(Czech Republic) Slovan	(Netherlands) PSV ^{1}	(Switzerland) Basel				
2014–15		(Croatia) Hajduk	(Azerbaijan) Qarabağ ^{1}	(Greece) Olympiacos	(Netherlands) Ajax	(Belgium) Brugge	(Italy) Napoli	(Spain) Sevilla
2015–16			(France) St. Étienne ^{1}					

- ^{1} Group stage. Highest-ranked eliminated team in case of qualification, lowest-ranked qualified team in case of elimination.
