= FC Chornomorets Odesa in European football =

Ukrainian club in European football

Chornomorets is a Ukrainian (previously Soviet) football club based in Odesa, southern Ukraine. The FC Chornomorets Odesa in European football debuted in 1975 originally representing the Soviet Union. They have taken part in UEFA-sanctioned cup competition about dozen times. Following dissolution of the Soviet Union in late 1991, it represents Ukraine.

== History ==
=== 1975–76 UEFA Cup ===
As league third place runners-up in the 1974 season, Chornomorets qualified for the UEFA Cup for the first time in 1975–76, alongside [at that time] fellow Soviet clubs both from Moscow – Spartak and Torpedo. Faced with S.S. Lazio of Italy, the Odesa footballers were successful at their debut at home 1–0 with the first half strike from Anatoliy Doroshenko, but in away game at Stadio Olimpico Chornomorets lost in extra time 0–3 with Giorgio Chinaglia scoring hat-trick.

Season	Competition	Round	Opposition	Score
1975–76	UEFA Cup	First round	(Italy) S.S. Lazio	1–0 (H), 0–3 (A) (Note: after extra time)

=== 1985–86 UEFA Cup ===
A finish of fourth in the 1984 season earned Chornomorets a second UEFA Cup campaign. Soviet clubs Spartak Moscow and Dnipro Dnipropetrovsk also qualified for the 1985–86 tournament. Chornomorets's first opponents this time were German club SV Werder Bremen. A 2–1 home win at Tsentralny Stadion ChMP in Odesa and a 2–3 'away' loss at Weserstadion earned the Odesa club a win on away goal rule and a progress to face Spanish club Real Madrid CF. Sailors lost the away leg 1–2 at Estadio Santiago Bernabéu, however a 0–0 draw in Odesa meant that Real progressed due to the aggregate goals advantage.

Season	Competition	Round	Opposition	Score
1985–86	UEFA Cup	First Round	(Germany) SV Werder Bremen	2–1 (H), 2–3 (A) (Note: Won on the away goals rule)
1985–86	UEFA Cup	Second Round	(Spain) Real Madrid CF	1–2 (A), 0–0 (H)

== Overall record ==
Accurate as of June 19, 2019

Competition	Played	Won	Drew	Lost	GF	GA	GD	Win%
Cup Winners' Cup	6	4	0	2	14	7	+7	66.67
UEFA Cup / UEFA Europa League	40	13	11	16	37	42	−5	32.50
UEFA Intertoto Cup	4	2	1	1	7	5	+2	50.00
Total	50	19	12	19	58	54	+4	38.00

Legend: GF = Goals For. GA = Goals Against. GD = Goal Difference.

== Results ==
Season	Competition	Round	Opponent	Home & away scores	UEFA coef.
1975–76	UEFA Cup	1R	(Italy) Lazio	1–0, 0–3	2.0
1985–86	UEFA Cup	1R	(Germany) Werder Bremen	2–1, 2–3	3.0
1985–86	UEFA Cup	2R	(Spain) Real Madrid	1–2, 0–0	3.0
1990–91	UEFA Cup	1R	(Norway) Rosenborg	3–1, 1–2	3.0
1990–91	UEFA Cup	2R	(France) Monaco	0–0, 0–1	3.0
1992–93	UEFA Cup Winners' Cup	Q	(Liechtenstein) Vaduz	5–0, 7–1	6.0
1992–93	UEFA Cup Winners' Cup	1R	(Greece) Olympiacos	1–0, 0–3	6.0
1994–95	UEFA Cup Winners' Cup	1R	(Switzerland) Grasshoppers	0–3, 1–0	2.0
1995–96	UEFA Cup	Q	(Malta) Hibernians	5–2, 2–0	7.0
1995–96	UEFA Cup	1R	(Poland) Widzew Łódź	1–0, 0–1 (6–5 (p))	7.0
1995–96	UEFA Cup	2R	(France) Lens	0–0, 0–4	7.0
1996–97	UEFA Cup	2Q	(Finland) HJK Helsinki	2–2, 2–0	4.0
1996–97	UEFA Cup	1R	(Romania) Național Bucharest	0–0, 0–2	4.0
2006–07	UEFA Cup	2Q	(Poland) Wisła Płock	0–0, 1–1	1.0
2006–07	UEFA Cup	1R	(Israel) Hapoel Tel Aviv	0–1, 1–3	1.0
2007	UEFA Intertoto Cup	2R	(Belarus) Shakhtyor Soligorsk	4–2, 2–0	0.0
2007	UEFA Intertoto Cup	3R	(France) Lens	0–0, 1–3	0.0
2013–14	UEFA Europa League	2Q	(Moldova) Dacia Chișinău	2–0, 1–2	11.5
2013–14	UEFA Europa League	3Q	(Serbia) Red Star Belgrade	3–1, 0–0	11.5
2013–14	UEFA Europa League	PO	(Albania) Skënderbeu Korçë	1–0, 0–1 (7–6 (p))	11.5
2013–14	UEFA Europa League	Group	(Bulgaria) Ludogorets Razgrad	0–1, 1–1	11.5
2013–14	UEFA Europa League	Group	(Netherlands) PSV Eindhoven	0–2, 1–0	11.5
2013–14	UEFA Europa League	Group	(Croatia) Dinamo Zagreb	2–1, 2–1	11.5
2013–14	UEFA Europa League	R32	(France) Lyon	0–0, 0–1	11.5
2014–15	UEFA Europa League	3Q	(Croatia) RNK Split	0–2, 0–0	0.5

== Statistics by country ==
Country	Club	P	W	D	L	GF	GA	GD
Albania	Skënderbeu Korçë	2	1	0	1	1	1	0
Subtotal		2	1	0	1	1	1	0
Belarus	Shakhtyor Soligorsk	2	2	0	0	6	2	+4
Subtotal		2	2	0	0	6	2	+4
Bulgaria	Ludogorets Razgrad	2	0	1	1	1	2	-1
Subtotal		2	0	1	1	1	2	-1
Croatia	Dinamo Zagreb	2	2	0	0	4	2	+2
Croatia	RNK Split	2	0	1	1	0	2	-2
Subtotal		4	2	1	1	4	4	0
Finland	HJK Helsinki	2	1	1	0	4	2	+2
Subtotal		2	1	1	0	4	2	+2
France	Monaco	2	0	1	1	0	1	-1
France	Lens	4	0	2	2	1	7	-6
France	Lyon	2	0	1	1	0	1	-1
Subtotal		8	0	4	4	1	9	-8
Germany	Werder Bremen	2	1	0	1	4	4	0
Subtotal		2	1	0	1	4	4	0
Greece	Olympiacos	2	1	0	1	1	3	-2
Subtotal		2	1	0	1	1	3	-2
Israel	Hapoel Tel Aviv	2	0	0	2	1	4	-3
Subtotal		2	0	0	2	1	4	-3
Italy	Lazio	2	1	0	1	1	3	-2
Subtotal		2	1	0	1	1	3	-2
Liechtenstein	Vaduz	2	2	0	0	12	1	+11
Subtotal		2	2	0	0	12	1	+11
Malta	Hibernians	2	2	0	0	7	2	+5
Subtotal		2	2	0	0	7	2	+5
Moldova	Dacia Chișinău	2	1	0	1	3	2	+1
Subtotal		2	1	0	1	3	2	+1
Netherlands	PSV Eindhoven	2	1	0	1	1	2	-1
Subtotal		2	1	0	1	1	2	-1
Norway	Rosenborg	2	1	0	1	4	3	+1
Subtotal		2	1	0	1	4	3	+1
Poland	Widzew Łódź	2	1	0	1	1	1	0
Poland	Wisła Płock	2	0	2	0	1	1	0
Subtotal		4	1	2	1	2	2	0
Romania	Nacional București	2	0	1	1	0	2	-2
Subtotal		2	0	1	1	0	2	-2
Serbia	Red Star Belgrade	2	1	1	0	3	1	+2
Subtotal		2	1	1	0	3	1	+2
Spain	Real Madrid	2	0	1	1	1	2	-1
Subtotal		2	0	1	1	1	2	-1
Switzerland	Grasshoppers	2	1	0	1	1	3	-2
Subtotal		2	1	0	1	1	3	-2
