= 2021–22 UEFA Women's Champions League qualifying rounds =

Tournament details
- Dates: 17 August–9 September 2021
- Teams: 68

The 2021–22 UEFA Women's Champions League qualifying rounds began on 17 August and ended on 9 September 2021.

A total of 68 teams competed in the group stage qualifying rounds of the 2021–22 UEFA Women's Champions League, which includes two rounds, with 46 teams in the Champions Path and 22 teams in the League Path. The 12 winners in the round 2 (seven from Champions Path, five from League Path) advanced to the group stage, to join the four teams that entered in that round.

Times are CEST (UTC+2), as listed by UEFA (local times, if different, are in parentheses).

== Teams ==
=== Champions Path ===
The Champions Path included all league champions which did not qualify directly for the group stage, and consisted of the following rounds:

- Round 1 (43 teams playing one-legged semi-finals, final and third place match): 43 teams which entered in this round.
- Round 2 (14 teams): three teams which entered in this round and eleven winners of the round 1 finals.

Below are the participating teams of the Champions Path (with their 2021 UEFA club coefficients), grouped by their starting rounds.

Key to colours
Winners of round 2 advance to group stage

Round 2
Team	Coeff.
(Czech Republic) Sparta Prague	35.300
(Sweden) BK Häcken	16.100
(Denmark) HB Køge	6.900

Round 1
Team	Coeff.
(Kazakhstan) BIIK Kazygurt	36.700
(Scotland) Glasgow City	33.600
(Austria) St. Pölten	28.000
(Netherlands) Twente	20.000
(Lithuania) Gintra Universitetas	18.600
(Serbia) Spartak Subotica	17.400
(Iceland) Breiðablik	17.000
(Italy) Juventus	15.200
(Bosnia and Herzegovina) SFK 2000	14.400
(Cyprus) Apollon Limassol	14.200
(Romania) Olimpia Cluj	12.000
(Albania) Vllaznia	10.800
(Belgium) Anderlecht	10.300
(Norway) Vålerenga	9.800
(Ukraine) Zhytlobud-1 Kharkiv	9.100
(Hungary) Ferencváros	8.300
(Switzerland) Servette Chênois	7.600
(Slovenia) Pomurje	7.400
(Greece) PAOK	7.000
(Croatia) Osijek	6.400
(Portugal) Benfica	5.600
(Russia) CSKA Moscow	5.500
(Bulgaria) NSA Sofia	5.400
(Slovakia) Slovan Bratislava	5.000
(Kosovo) Mitrovica	5.000
(Montenegro) Breznica Pljevlja	4.800
(Belarus) Dinamo-BGU Minsk	4.200
(Faroe Islands) KÍ	3.600
(Turkey) Beşiktaş	3.500
(Estonia) Flora	2.900
(Poland) Czarni Sosnowiec	2.900
(Republic of Ireland) Peamount United	2.300
(Israel) Kiryat Gat	2.000
(Wales) Swansea City	1.900
(Malta) Birkirkara	1.800
(Finland) Åland United	1.700
(Moldova) Agarista Anenii Noi	1.300
(Latvia) Rīgas FS	1.200
(North Macedonia) Kamenica Sasa	1.200
(Luxembourg) Racing FC	1.200
(Georgia (country)) Tbilisi Nike	0.600
(Northern Ireland) Glentoran	0.400
(Armenia) Hayasa	0.200

=== League Path ===
The League Path includes all league non-champions and consists of the following rounds:

- Round 1 (16 teams playing one-legged semi-finals, final and 3rd place match): 16 teams which enter in this round.
- Round 2 (10 teams): 6 teams which enter in this round and 4 winners of the round 1 finals.

Below are the participating teams of the League Path (with their 2021 UEFA club coefficients), grouped by their starting rounds.

Key to colours
Winners of round 2 advance to group stage

Round 2
Team	Coeff.
(France) Lyon	124.400
(Germany) VfL Wolfsburg	97.100
(England) Manchester City	79.700
(Czech Republic) Slavia Prague	52.300
(Sweden) Rosengård	49.100
(Spain) Real Madrid	12.800

Round 1
Team	Coeff.
(Denmark) Brøndby	41.900
(Switzerland) Zürich	30.600
(England) Arsenal	27.700
(Belarus) FC Minsk	25.200
(France) Bordeaux	18.400
(Germany) 1899 Hoffenheim	15.100
(Spain) Levante	12.800
(Netherlands) PSV	9.000
(Sweden) Kristianstad	8.100
(Czech Republic) Slovácko	7.300
(Iceland) Valur	7.000
(Kazakhstan) Okzhetpes	6.700
(Italy) Milan	5.200
(Norway) Rosenborg	4.800
(Scotland) Celtic	4.600
(Russia) Lokomotiv Moscow	3.500

== Format ==
Round 1 consisted of mini-tournaments with two semi-finals, a final and a third-place play-off hosted by one of the participating teams. If the score was level at the end of normal time, extra time was played, and if the same number of goals were scored by both teams during extra time, the tie was decided by a penalty shoot-out. Round 2 was played over two legs, with each team playing one leg at home. The team that scored more goals on aggregate over the two legs advance to the next round. If the aggregate score was level at the end of normal time of the second leg, the away goals rule was no longer applied starting from this season. To decide the winner of the tie, extra time was played, and if the same number of goals were scored by both teams at the end of normal time, the tie was decided by a penalty shoot-out. An additional preliminary round consisting of two-legged home-and-away matches would have been played by the champions from the lowest-ranked associations if more than 50 associations had entered the tournament and the title holders hadn't qualified through league position. Since only 50 associations entered, this round was skipped.

In the draws for each round, teams were seeded based on their UEFA club coefficients at the beginning of the season, with the teams divided into seeded and unseeded pots containing the same number of teams. Prior to the draws, UEFA may form "groups" in accordance with the principles set by the Club Competitions Committee, but they are purely for convenience of the draw and do not resemble any real groupings in the sense of the competition. Teams from associations with political conflicts as decided by UEFA may not be drawn into the same tie. After the draws, the order of legs of a tie could have been reversed by UEFA due to scheduling or venue conflicts.

== Schedule ==
The schedule of the competition was as follows (all draws were held at the UEFA headquarters in Nyon, Switzerland).

Schedule for 2021–22 UEFA Women's Champions League qualifying rounds
Round	Draw date	First leg	Second leg
Round 1	2 July 2021	17–18 August 2021 (semi-finals)	20–21 August 2021 (third-place play-off & final)
Round 2	22 August 2021	31 August – 1 September 2021	8–9 September 2021

== Round 1 ==
The draw for Round 1 was held on 2 July 2021, 13:00 CEST. The hosts of each tournament were selected after the draw. The semi-finals were played on 17 and 18 August, and the third-place play-offs and finals on 20 and 21 August 2021. The winners of the finals advanced to round 2.

=== Seeding ===
A total of 59 teams played in Round 1. They were divided into two paths:

- Champions Path (43 teams): 43 teams which entered in this round.
- League Path (16 teams): 16 teams which entered in this round.

Seeding of teams for the semi-final round was based on their 2021 UEFA club coefficients, with 22 seeded teams and 21 unseeded teams in the Champions Path, and 8 seeded teams and 8 unseeded teams in the League Path. Teams were drawn into two semi-finals within each four team group and, for the group with three teams, the team with the highest coefficient was given a bye to the final. In the semi-finals, seeded teams would be considered the "home" team for administrative purposes, while in the third-place play-offs and finals, the teams with the highest coefficients would be considered the "home" team for administrative purposes. Due to political reasons, teams from the following associations could not be drawn into the same group: Kosovo / Bosnia and Herzegovina; Kosovo / Serbia; Kosovo / Russia; Ukraine / Russia.

Champions Path
Seeded	Unseeded
(Kazakhstan) BIIK Kazygurt; (Scotland) Glasgow City; (Austria) St. Pölten; (Netherlands) Twente; (Lithuania) Gintra Universitetas; (Serbia) Spartak Subotica; (Iceland) Breiðablik; (Italy) Juventus; (Bosnia and Herzegovina) SFK 2000; (Cyprus) Apollon Limassol; (Romania) Olimpia Cluj; (Albania) Vllaznia; (Belgium) Anderlecht; (Norway) Vålerenga; (Ukraine) Zhytlobud-1 Kharkiv; (Hungary) Ferencváros; (Switzerland) Servette Chênois; (Slovenia) Pomurje; (Greece) PAOK; (Croatia) Osijek; (Portugal) Benfica; (Russia) CSKA Moscow	(Bulgaria) NSA Sofia; (Slovakia) Slovan Bratislava; (Kosovo) Mitrovica; (Montenegro) Breznica Pljevlja; (Belarus) Dinamo-BGU Minsk; (Faroe Islands) KÍ; (Turkey) Beşiktaş; (Estonia) Flora; (Poland) Czarni Sosnowiec; (Republic of Ireland) Peamount United; (Israel) Kiryat Gat; (Wales) Swansea City; (Malta) Birkirkara; (Finland) Åland United; (Moldova) Agarista Anenii Noi; (Latvia) Rīgas FS; (North Macedonia) Kamenica Sasa; Racing FC Union Luxembourg; (Georgia (country)) Nike Tbilisi; (Northern Ireland) Glentoran; (Armenia) Hayasa

League Path
Seeded	Unseeded
(Denmark) Brøndby; (Switzerland) Zürich; (England) Arsenal; (Belarus) FC Minsk; (France) Bordeaux; (Germany) 1899 Hoffenheim; (Spain) Levante; (Netherlands) PSV	(Sweden) Kristianstad; (Czech Republic) Slovácko; (Iceland) Valur; (Kazakhstan) Okzhetpes; (Italy) Milan; (Norway) Rosenborg; (Scotland) Celtic; (Russia) Lokomotiv Moscow

=== Champions Path ===
==== Tournament 1 ====
===== Bracket =====
Hosted by Gintra Universitetas.

Semi-finals
18 August
(Lithuania) Gintra Universitetas	2
(Estonia) Flora	0
18 August
(Iceland) Breiðablik	7
(Faroe Islands) KÍ	0

Final
21 August
(Lithuania) Gintra Universitetas	1
(Iceland) Breiðablik	8
Third place
21 August
(Faroe Islands) KÍ	0
(Estonia) Flora	1

===== Semi-finals =====
18 August 2021
11:00 (12:00 EEST)

Breiðablik (Iceland)	7–0	(Faroe Islands) KÍ
Magnúsdóttir 28', 90+3'; Van de Velde 33'; McCarty 36'; Albertsdóttir 45', 58' (pen.); Tómasdóttir 45+1'	Report

Savivaldybė Stadium, Šiauliai
Referee: Emanuela Rusta (Albania)

18 August 2021
17:00 (18:00 EEST)

Gintra Universitetas (Lithuania)	2–0	(Estonia) Flora
Ayers 45'; Gibson 60'	Report

Savivaldybė Stadium, Šiauliai
Referee: Cristina Trandafir (Romania)

===== Third-place play-off =====
21 August 2021
11:00 (12:00 EEST)

KÍ (Faroe Islands)	0–1	(Estonia) Flora
	Report	Saar 21'

Savivaldybė Stadium, Šiauliai
Referee: Galiya Echeva (Bulgaria)

===== Final =====
21 August 2021
17:00 (18:00 EEST)

Gintra Universitetas (Lithuania)	1–8	(Iceland) Breiðablik
Gibson 50'	Report	McCarty 10', 49'; Albertsdóttir 42', 64', 72'; Gunnlaugsdóttir 43'; Lillýardóttir 55'; Van de Velde 76'

Savivaldybė Stadium, Šiauliai
Referee: Henrikke Nervik (Norway)

==== Tournament 2 ====
===== Bracket =====
Hosted by Glasgow City.

Semi-finals
18 August
(Kazakhstan) BIIK Kazygurt	4
(Slovakia) Slovan Bratislava	0
18 August
(Scotland) Glasgow City	3
(Malta) Birkirkara	0

Final
21 August
(Kazakhstan) BIIK Kazygurt	0
(Scotland) Glasgow City	1
Third place
21 August
(Slovakia) Slovan Bratislava (a.e.t.)	1
(Malta) Birkirkara	0

===== Semi-finals =====
18 August 2021
11:00 (10:00 BST)

Glasgow City (Scotland)	3–0	(Malta) Birkirkara
Shine 4'; Chinchilla 15'; Kats 43'	Report

Broadwood Stadium, Cumbernauld
Referee: Ifeoma Kulmala (Finland)

18 August 2021
16:00 (15:00 BST)

BIIK Kazygurt (Kazakhstan)	4–0	(Slovakia) Slovan Bratislava
Kundananji 26', 62'; Rose 77'; Chilufya 83'	Report

Broadwood Stadium, Cumbernauld
Referee: Katalin Sipos (Hungary)

===== Third-place play-off =====
21 August 2021
16:00 (15:00 BST)

Slovan Bratislava (Slovakia)	1–0 (a.e.t.)	(Malta) Birkirkara
Hrdličková 93'	Report

Broadwood Stadium, Cumbernauld
Referee: Valentina Finzi (Italy)

===== Final =====
21 August 2021
21:00 (20:00 BST)

BIIK Kazygurt (Kazakhstan)	0–1	(Scotland) Glasgow City
	Report	Chinchilla 61'

Broadwood Stadium, Cumbernauld
Referee: Sabina Bolić (Croatia)

==== Tournament 3 ====
===== Bracket =====
Hosted by Osijek.

Semi-finals
18 August
(Belgium) Anderlecht	3
(Armenia) Hayasa	0
18 August
(Croatia) Osijek	5
(Montenegro) Breznica Pljevlja	0

Final
21 August
(Belgium) Anderlecht	0
(Croatia) Osijek	1
Third place
21 August
(Montenegro) Breznica Pljevlja	3
(Armenia) Hayasa	2

===== Semi-finals =====
18 August 2021
15:00

Anderlecht (Belgium)	3–0	(Armenia) Hayasa
Vătafu 57'; Tison 63'; Wullaert 78'	Report

Gradski Vrt Stadium, Osijek
Referee: Alina Peşu (Romania)

18 August 2021
21:00

Osijek (Croatia)	5–0	(Montenegro) Breznica Pljevlja
Nevrkla 7'; Lubina 27'; Joščak 53'; Kovačević 84'; Balić 89'	Report

Gradski Vrt Stadium, Osijek
Referee: Miriama Matulová (Slovakia)

===== Third-place play-off =====
21 August 2021
15:00

Breznica Pljevlja (Montenegro)	3–2	(Armenia) Hayasa
Šaranović 44'; Đurđevac 49'; Tošković 84'	Report	Yeghyan 26', 65'

Gradski Vrt Stadium, Osijek
Referee: Michaliną Diakow (Poland)

===== Final =====
21 August 2021
21:00

Anderlecht (Belgium)	0–1	(Croatia) Osijek
	Report	Lojna 54'

Gradski Vrt Stadium, Osijek
Referee: Reelika Turi (Estonia)

==== Tournament 4 ====
===== Bracket =====
Hosted by SFK 2000.

Semi-finals
18 August
(Portugal) Benfica	4
(Israel) Kiryat Gat	0
18 August
(Bosnia and Herzegovina) SFK 2000	0
(Luxembourg) Racing FC	1

Final
21 August
(Portugal) Benfica	7
(Luxembourg) Racing FC	0
Third place
21 August
(Bosnia and Herzegovina) SFK 2000 (a.e.t.) (p)	1 (4)
(Israel) Kiryat Gat	1 (2)

===== Semi-finals =====
18 August 2021
11:00

SFK 2000 (Bosnia and Herzegovina)	0–1	(Luxembourg) Racing FC
	Report	Rinaldi 66'

FF BH Football Training Centre, Zenica
Referee: Jurgita Mačikunytė (Lithuania)

18 August 2021
17:00

Benfica (Portugal)	4–0	(Israel) Kiryat Gat
Aninha 52' (pen.), 54'; Valéria 69'; Nazareth 85'	Report

FF BH Football Training Centre, Zenica
Referee: Tanja Subotič (Slovenia)

===== Third-place play-off =====
21 August 2021
11:00

SFK 2000 (Bosnia and Herzegovina)	1–1 (a.e.t.)	(Israel) Kiryat Gat
Al. Spahić 10'	Report	Ozel 63'
Penalties
Milinković (penalty scored); Am. Spahić (penalty scored); Kamerić (penalty scored); Kršo (penalty missed); Al. Spahić (penalty scored)	4–2	(penalty scored) Ana; (penalty missed) Rantissi; (penalty missed) Sofer; (penalty scored) Efih

FF BH Football Training Centre, Zenica
Referee: Neslihan Muratdağı (Turkey)

===== Final =====
21 August 2021
17:00

Benfica (Portugal)	7–0	(Luxembourg) Racing FC
Amado 2'; Valéria 21', 90+4'; Nazareth 40' (pen.), 42'; Raysla 90' (pen.); Cameirão 90+3'	Report

FF BH Football Training Centre, Zenica
Referee: Michèle Schmölzer (Switzerland)

==== Tournament 5 ====
===== Bracket =====
Hosted by Åland United.

Semi-finals
18 August
(Switzerland) Servette Chênois	1
(Northern Ireland) Glentoran	0
18 August
(Romania) Olimpia Cluj	0
(Finland) Åland United	4

Final
21 August
(Switzerland) Servette Chênois	1
(Finland) Åland United	0
Third place
21 August
(Romania) Olimpia Cluj	0
(Northern Ireland) Glentoran	2

===== Semi-finals =====
18 August 2021
13:00 (14:00 EEST)

Servette Chênois (Switzerland)	1–0	(Northern Ireland) Glentoran
Jade 2'	Report

Wiklöf Holding Arena, Mariehamn
Referee: Zulema González González (Spain)

18 August 2021
19:00 (20:00 EEST)

Olimpia Cluj (Romania)	0–4	(Finland) Åland United
	Report	Jaleca 21', 45'; Westerlund 51'; Korhonen 56'

Wiklöf Holding Arena, Mariehamn
Referee: Ioanna Allayiotou (Cyprus)

===== Third-place play-off =====
21 August 2021
13:00 (14:00 EEST)

Olimpia Cluj (Romania)	0–2	(Northern Ireland) Glentoran
	Report	Andrews 55'; McCarron 85'

Wiklöf Holding Arena, Mariehamn
Referee: Emilie Dokset (Norway)

===== Final =====
21 August 2021
19:00 (20:00 EEST)

Servette Chênois (Switzerland)	1–0	(Finland) Åland United
Felber 45+2'	Report

Wiklöf Holding Arena, Mariehamn
Referee: Jelena Pejković (Croatia)

==== Tournament 6 ====
===== Bracket =====
Hosted by Apollon Limassol.

Semi-finals
18 August
(Cyprus) Apollon Limassol (a.e.t.)	2
(Belarus) Dinamo-BGU Minsk	0
18 August
(Russia) CSKA Moscow (a.e.t.)	4
(Wales) Swansea City	1

Final
21 August
(Cyprus) Apollon Limassol	2
(Russia) CSKA Moscow	1
Third place
21 August
(Belarus) Dinamo-BGU Minsk	2
(Wales) Swansea City	0

===== Semi-finals =====
18 August 2021
15:30 (16:30 EEST)

Apollon Limassol (Cyprus)	2–0 (a.e.t.)	(Belarus) Dinamo-BGU Minsk
Freda 99'; Hmírová 105' (pen.)	Report

Tsirio Stadium, Limassol
Referee: Olivia Tschon (Austria)

18 August 2021
20:45 (21:45 EEST)

CSKA Moscow (Russia)	4–1 (a.e.t.)	(Wales) Swansea City
Damjanović 89'; Smirnova 91', 110'; Chernomyrdina 112'	Report	Chivers 90+1'

Tsirio Stadium, Limassol
Referee: Tanja Račić (Bosnia and Herzegovina)

===== Third-place play-off =====
21 August 2021
15:30 (16:30 EEST)

Dinamo-BGU Minsk (Belarus)	2–0	(Wales) Swansea City
Jenkins 3' (o.g.); Ndzana 44'	Report

Tsirio Stadium, Limassol
Referee: Marina Živković (Serbia)

===== Final =====
21 August 2021
20:45 (21:45 EEST)

Apollon Limassol (Cyprus)	2–1	(Russia) CSKA Moscow
Freda 39'; Lockwood 66'	Report	Myasnikova 32'

Tsirio Stadium, Limassol
Referee: Maria Marotta (Italy)

==== Tournament 7 ====
===== Bracket =====
Hosted by PAOK.

Semi-finals
18 August
(Norway) Vålerenga	5
(Kosovo) Mitrovica	0
18 August
(Greece) PAOK	6
(Moldova) Agarista Anenii Noi	0

Final
21 August
(Norway) Vålerenga	2
(Greece) PAOK	0
Third place
21 August
(Kosovo) Mitrovica	3
(Moldova) Agarista Anenii Noi	0

===== Semi-finals =====
18 August 2021
17:00 (18:00 EEST)

PAOK (Greece)	6–0	(Moldova) Agarista Anenii Noi
Baxevanou 3'; Papadopoulou 17'; Mitkou 38'; Akida 51', 88', 90+2'	Report

Makedonikos Stadium, Thessaloniki
Referee: Ainara Andrea Acevedo Dudley (Spain)

18 August 2021
17:00 (18:00 EEST)

Vålerenga (Norway)	5–0	(Kosovo) Mitrovica
Thomsen 29', 57'; Thorsnes 76', 88', 90+3'	Report

Giannitsa Municipal Stadium, Giannitsa
Referee: Simona Ghisletta (Switzerland)

===== Third-place play-off =====
21 August 2021
17:00 (18:00 EEST)

Mitrovica (Kosovo)	3–0	(Moldova) Agarista Anenii Noi
Kryeziu 2', 74'; Gjegji 21'	Report

Giannitsa Municipal Stadium, Giannitsa
Referee: Kirsty Dowle (England)

===== Final =====
21 August 2021
16:00 (17:00 EEST)

Vålerenga (Norway)	2–0	(Greece) PAOK
Thomsen 54'; Thorsnes 88' (pen.)	Report

Makedonikos Stadium, Thessaloniki
Referee: Aleksandra Česen (Slovenia)

==== Tournament 8 ====
===== Bracket =====
Hosted by Juventus.

Semi-finals
18 August
(Austria) St. Pölten	7
(Turkey) Beşiktaş	0
18 August
(Italy) Juventus	12
(North Macedonia) Kamenica Sasa	0

Final
21 August
(Austria) St. Pölten	1
(Italy) Juventus	4
Third place
21 August
(Turkey) Beşiktaş	4
(North Macedonia) Kamenica Sasa	0

===== Semi-finals =====
18 August 2021
15:00

Juventus (Italy)	12–0	(North Macedonia) Kamenica Sasa
Caruso 3', 12', 76'; Rosucci 18'; Girelli 45+2', 56'; Bonansea 51'; Zamanian 59'; Stašková 64', 84', 90'; Bonfantini 90+2'	Report

Juventus Training Center, Turin
Referee: Frederikke Lydia Søkjær (Denmark)

18 August 2021
21:00

St. Pölten (Austria)	7–0	(Turkey) Beşiktaş
Zver 9'; Enzinger 16', 18', 26'; Brunnthaler 45+3'; Mikolajová 60', 66'	Report

Juventus Training Center, Turin
Referee: Jelena Međedović (Serbia)

===== Third-place play-off =====
21 August 2021
15:00

Beşiktaş (Turkey)	4–0	(North Macedonia) Kamenica Sasa
Uraz 57'; Karabulut 78'; İçen 88' (pen.); Hançar 90+3'	Report

Juventus Training Center, Turin
Referee: Jelena Međedović (Serbia)

===== Final =====
21 August 2021
21:00

St. Pölten (Austria)	1–4	(Italy) Juventus
Enzinger 67'	Report	Bonansea 8', 54'; Girelli 64'; Hurtig 90+2'

Juventus Training Center, Turin
Referee: María Dolores Martínez Madrona (Spain)

==== Tournament 9 ====
===== Bracket =====
Hosted by Twente.

Semi-finals
18 August
(Netherlands) Twente	9
(Georgia (country)) Tbilisi Nike	0
18 August
(Serbia) Spartak Subotica	5
(Republic of Ireland) Peamount United	2

Final
21 August
(Netherlands) Twente (a.e.t.)	5
(Serbia) Spartak Subotica	3
Third place
21 August
(Republic of Ireland) Peamount United	w/o
(Georgia (country)) Tbilisi Nike

The third place play-off between Peamount United and Tbilisi Nike was cancelled following a decision taken by the Dutch health authorities to put the whole team of Tbilisi Nike into quarantine after a player had tested positive for COVID-19. The result of the match was awarded by UEFA as a walkover for Peamount United.

===== Semi-finals =====
18 August 2021
12:00

Spartak Subotica (Serbia)	5–2	(Republic of Ireland) Peamount United
Filipović 4', 40', 45', 54'; Kusi 62'	Report	Ryan-Doyle 72', 89'

Sportcampus Diekman, Enschede
Referee: Ana Maria Alexandra Terteleac (Romania)

18 August 2021
19:00

Twente (Netherlands)	9–0	(Georgia (country)) Tbilisi Nike
Kalma 18', 39', 44', 45+1'; Stolze 21'; Dijkstra 53'; Jansen 67'; De Keijzer 76', 84'	Report

Sportcampus Diekman, Enschede
Referee: Cansu Tiryaki (Turkey)

===== Third-place play-off =====
21 August 2021
12:00

Peamount United (Republic of Ireland)	Cancelled	(Georgia (country)) Tbilisi Nike
	Report

Sportcampus Diekman, Enschede
Referee: Maria Sole Caputi (Italy)

===== Final =====
21 August 2021
19:00

Twente (Netherlands)	5–3 (a.e.t.)	(Serbia) Spartak Subotica
Kalma 80', 86', 108' (pen.); Stolze 84'; Jansen 117'	Report	Owusu-Ansah 21', 68'; Filipović 73'

Sportcampus Diekman, Enschede
Referee: Lucie Šulcová (Czech Republic)

==== Tournament 10 ====
===== Bracket =====
Hosted by Pomurje.

Semi-finals
18 August
(Ukraine) Zhytlobud-1 Kharkiv	5
(Bulgaria) NSA Sofia	1
18 August
(Slovenia) Pomurje	6
(Latvia) Rīgas FS	1

Final
21 August
(Ukraine) Zhytlobud-1 Kharkiv	4
(Slovenia) Pomurje	1
Third place
21 August
(Bulgaria) NSA Sofia	2
(Latvia) Rīgas FS	1

===== Semi-finals =====
18 August 2021
11:00

Zhytlobud-1 Kharkiv (Ukraine)	5–1	(Bulgaria) NSA Sofia
Shevchuk 11'; Shmatko 52'; Ovdiychuk 61'; Boychenko 84'; Kochnyeva 87'	Report	Aleksandrova 29'

ŠRC Bakovci Stadium, Bakovci
Attendance: 30
Referee: Louise Thompson (Northern Ireland)

18 August 2021
17:00

Pomurje (Slovenia)	6–1	(Latvia) Rīgas FS
Korošec 9'; Kolbl 11'; Makovec 41', 60'; Rakovec 82'; Rozmarič 85'	Report	Krasnova 45+6'

TŠC Trate Gornja Radgona, Gornja Radgona
Attendance: 200
Referee: Araksya Saribekyan (Armenia)

===== Third-place play-off =====
21 August 2021
11:00

NSA Sofia (Bulgaria)	2–1	(Latvia) Rīgas FS
Naydenova 48'; Yaneva 58'	Report	Poluhovica 72'

ŠRC Bakovci Stadium, Bakovci
Attendance: 30
Referee: Angelika Söder (Germany)

===== Final =====
21 August 2021
17:00

Zhytlobud-1 Kharkiv (Ukraine)	4–1	(Slovenia) Pomurje
Sadıkoğlu 19'; Ovdiychuk 41'; Boychenko 50'; Shmatko 57'	Report	Korošec 37' (pen.)

TŠC Trate Gornja Radgona, Gornja Radgona
Attendance: 300
Referee: Ewa Augustyn (Poland)

==== Tournament 11 ====
===== Bracket =====
Hosted by Czarni Sosnowiec.

Semi-finals
17 August
(Hungary) Ferencváros	2
(Poland) Czarni Sosnowiec	1

Final
20 August
(Albania) Vllaznia (a.e.t.) (p)	0 (3)
(Hungary) Ferencváros	0 (1)

===== Semi-finals =====
17 August 2021
20:45

Ferencváros (Hungary)	2–1	(Poland) Czarni Sosnowiec
Brandon 17'; Vágó 56'	Report	Fischerová 50'

Stadion Ludowy, Sosnowiec
Referee: Zuzana Valentová (Slovakia)

===== Final =====
20 August 2021
19:45

Vllaznia (Albania)	0–0 (a.e.t.)	(Hungary) Ferencváros
	Report
Penalties
Gjini (penalty scored); Franja (penalty scored); Berisha (penalty scored)	3–1	(penalty missed) Vágó; (penalty scored) Mosdóczi; (penalty missed) Pusztai; (penalty missed) Szabó

Stadion Ludowy, Sosnowiec
Referee: Eleni Antoniou (Greece)

=== League Path ===
==== Tournament 1 ====
===== Bracket =====
Hosted by Zürich.

Semi-finals
17 August
(Germany) 1899 Hoffenheim	1
(Iceland) Valur	0
17 August
(Switzerland) Zürich	1
(Italy) Milan	2

Final
20 August
(Germany) 1899 Hoffenheim	2
(Italy) Milan	0
Third place
20 August
(Switzerland) Zürich	1
(Iceland) Valur	3

===== Semi-finals =====
17 August 2021
14:00

1899 Hoffenheim (Germany)	1–0	(Iceland) Valur
Billa 57'	Report

Letzigrund, Zürich
Referee: Andromachi Tsiofliki (Greece)

17 August 2021
20:00

Zürich (Switzerland)	1–2	(Italy) Milan
Mégroz 68'	Report	Giacinti 33', 82'

Letzigrund, Zürich
Referee: Kateryna Usova (Ukraine)

===== Third-place play-off =====
20 August 2021
14:00

Zürich (Switzerland)	1–3	(Iceland) Valur
Mégroz 59'	Report	Friðriksdóttir 32'; Hintzen 51', 53'

Letzigrund, Zürich
Referee: Abigail Marriott (England)

===== Final =====
20 August 2021
20:00

1899 Hoffenheim (Germany)	2–0	(Italy) Milan
Brand 36'; Hartig 59'	Report

Letzigrund, Zürich
Referee: Rasa Imanalijeva (Lithuania)

==== Tournament 2 ====
===== Bracket =====
Hosted by Kristianstad.

Semi-finals
18 August
(France) Bordeaux	2
(Czech Republic) Slovácko	1
18 August
(Denmark) Brøndby	0
(Sweden) Kristianstad	1

Final
21 August
(France) Bordeaux	3
(Sweden) Kristianstad	1
Third place
21 August
(Denmark) Brøndby	2
(Czech Republic) Slovácko	1

===== Semi-finals =====
18 August 2021
14:00

Brøndby (Denmark)	0–1	(Sweden) Kristianstad
	Report	Nilsson 32'

Kristianstads Fotbollsarena, Kristianstad
Referee: Merima Čelik (Bosnia and Herzegovina)

18 August 2021
20:00

Bordeaux (France)	2–1	(Czech Republic) Slovácko
Jaurena 37'; Gilles 90+4'	Report	Pěčková 90+3'

Kristianstads Fotbollsarena, Kristianstad
Referee: Viki De Cremer (Belgium)

===== Third-place play-off =====
21 August 2021
14:00

Brøndby (Denmark)	2–1	(Czech Republic) Slovácko
Persson 23'; Beck 30'	Report	Dubcová 39'

Kristianstads Fotbollsarena, Kristianstad
Referee: Irena Velevačkoska (North Macedonia)

===== Final =====
21 August 2021
20:00

Bordeaux (France)	3–1	(Sweden) Kristianstad
Herrera 9'; Gilles 20'; Snoeijs 43'	Report	Carlsson 26'

Kristianstads Fotbollsarena, Kristianstad
Referee: Jelena Cvetković (Serbia)

==== Tournament 3 ====
===== Bracket =====
Hosted by Rosenborg.

Semi-finals
18 August
(Spain) Levante	2
(Scotland) Celtic	1
18 August
(Belarus) FC Minsk	1
(Norway) Rosenborg	2

Final
21 August
(Spain) Levante (a.e.t.)	4
(Norway) Rosenborg	3
Third place
21 August
(Belarus) FC Minsk (a.e.t.)	3
(Scotland) Celtic	2

===== Semi-finals =====
18 August 2021
12:00

FC Minsk (Belarus)	1–2	(Norway) Rosenborg
Kuč 38'	Report	Blakstad 29'; Utland 75'

Koteng Arena, Trondheim
Referee: Alexandra Deligianni (Greece)

18 August 2021
18:00

Levante (Spain)	2–1	(Scotland) Celtic
Toletti 36'; Redondo 51'	Report	Hayes 64'

Koteng Arena, Trondheim
Referee: Vera Opeykina (Russia)

===== Third-place play-off =====
21 August 2021
12:00

FC Minsk (Belarus)	3–2 (a.e.t.)	(Scotland) Celtic
Kapetanovic 18'; Kuč 91', 111'	Report	Donaldson 36'; Hayes 118'

Koteng Arena, Trondheim
Referee: Veronika Kovářová (Czech Republic)

===== Final =====
21 August 2021
18:00

Levante (Spain)	4–3 (a.e.t.)	(Norway) Rosenborg
Baños 13'; Toletti 79'; Queiroz 105', 109'	Report	Utland 76', 115'; Blakstad 87'

Koteng Arena, Trondheim
Referee: Eszter Urbán (Hungary)

==== Tournament 4 ====
===== Bracket =====
Hosted by Lokomotiv Moscow.

Semi-finals
18 August
(England) Arsenal	4
(Kazakhstan) Okzhetpes	0
18 August
(Netherlands) PSV	3
(Russia) Lokomotiv Moscow	1

Final
21 August
(England) Arsenal	3
(Netherlands) PSV	1
Third place
21 August
(Kazakhstan) Okzhetpes	0
(Russia) Lokomotiv Moscow	4

===== Semi-finals =====
18 August 2021
12:00 (13:00 MSK)

Arsenal (England)	4–0	(Kazakhstan) Okzhetpes
Iwabuchi 14'; Little 18' (pen.); Mead 65'; Parris 75'	Report

Sapsan Arena, Moscow
Referee: Katarzyna Lisiecka-Sęk (Poland)

18 August 2021
18:00 (19:00 MSK)

PSV (Netherlands)	3–1	(Russia) Lokomotiv Moscow
Brugts 6'; Waldus 65'; Thestrup 90+5'	Report	Belomyttseva 4'

Sapsan Arena, Moscow
Referee: Sofik Torosyan (Armenia)

===== Third-place play-off =====
21 August 2021
12:00 (13:00 MSK)

Okzhetpes (Kazakhstan)	0–4	(Russia) Lokomotiv Moscow
	Report	Mashkova 18'; Korovkina 30'; Kozhnikova 54'; Fedorova 69'

Sapsan Arena, Moscow
Referee: Justina Lavrenovaitė-Perez (Lithuania)

===== Final =====
21 August 2021
18:00 (19:00 MSK)

Arsenal (England)	3–1	(Netherlands) PSV
Miedema 19'; Iwabuchi 39', 65'	Report	Brugts 51'

Sapsan Arena, Moscow
Referee: Petra Pavlíková (Slovakia)

== Round 2 ==
The draw for Round 2 was held on 22 August 2021, 13:00 CEST.

=== Seeding ===
A total of 24 teams play in Round 2. They were divided into two paths:

- Champions Path (14 teams): 3 teams which entered in this round, and 11 winners of Round 1 (Champions Path).
- League Path (10 teams): 6 teams which entered in this round, and 4 winners of Round 1 (League Path).

Seeding of teams was based on their 2021 UEFA club coefficients, with 7 seeded teams and 7 unseeded teams in the Champions Path, and 5 seeded teams and 5 unseeded teams in the League Path. Teams from the same association in the League Path could not be drawn against each other. The first team drawn in each tie would be the home team of the first leg.

Champions Path
Seeded	Unseeded
(Czech Republic) Sparta Prague; (Scotland) Glasgow City; (Netherlands) Twente; (Iceland) Breiðablik; (Sweden) BK Häcken; (Italy) Juventus; (Cyprus) Apollon Limassol	(Albania) Vllaznia; (Norway) Vålerenga; (Ukraine) Zhytlobud-1 Kharkiv; (Switzerland) Servette Chênois; (Denmark) HB Køge; (Croatia) Osijek; (Portugal) Benfica

League Path
Seeded	Unseeded
(France) Lyon; (Germany) VfL Wolfsburg; (England) Manchester City; (Czech Republic) Slavia Prague; (Sweden) Rosengård	(England) Arsenal; (France) Bordeaux; (Germany) 1899 Hoffenheim; (Spain) Real Madrid; (Spain) Levante

=== Summary ===
The first legs were played on 31 August and 1 September, and the second legs on 8 and 9 September 2021.

The winners of the ties will advance to the group stage.

Champions Path
Team 1	Agg.	Team 2	1st leg	2nd leg
Sparta Prague (Czech Republic)	0–3	(Denmark) HB Køge	0–1	0–2
Osijek (Croatia)	1–4	(Iceland) Breiðablik	1–1	0–3
Vllaznia (Albania)	0–3	(Italy) Juventus	0–2	0–1
Twente (Netherlands)	1–5	(Portugal) Benfica	1–1	0–4
Apollon Limassol (Cyprus)	2–5	(Ukraine) Zhytlobud-1 Kharkiv	1–2	1–3
Servette Chênois (Switzerland)	3–2	(Scotland) Glasgow City	1–1	2–1
Vålerenga (Norway)	3–6	(Sweden) BK Häcken	1–3	2–3

League Path
Team 1	Agg.	Team 2	1st leg	2nd leg
Levante (Spain)	2–4	(France) Lyon	1–2	1–2
Arsenal (England)	7–0	(Czech Republic) Slavia Prague	3–0	4–0
Real Madrid (Spain)	2–1	(England) Manchester City	1–1	1–0
VfL Wolfsburg (Germany)	5–5 (3–0 p)	(France) Bordeaux	3–2	2–3 (a.e.t.)
Rosengård (Sweden)	3–6	(Germany) 1899 Hoffenheim	0–3	3–3

==== Champions Path ====
1 September 2021
18:00

Sparta Prague (Czech Republic)	0–1	(Denmark) HB Køge
	Report	Kramer 73'

Stadium FC Chomutov, Chomutov
Attendance: 302
Referee: Katalin Sipos (Hungary)
8 September 2021
18:00

HB Køge (Denmark)	2–0	(Czech Republic) Sparta Prague
Fløe Nielsen 53'; Kramer 83'	Report

Køge Stadium, Køge
Attendance: 990
Referee: Karoline Wacker (Germany)

HB Køge won 3–0 on aggregate.

1 September 2021
18:00

Osijek (Croatia)	1–1	(Iceland) Breiðablik
Medić 31'	Report	Magnúsdóttir 24'

Stadion Gradski vrt, Osijek
Attendance: 280
Referee: Frida Nielsen (Denmark)
9 September 2021
19:00 (17:00 WET)

Breiðablik (Iceland)	3–0	(Croatia) Osijek
Antonsdóttir 9'; Ziemer 10'; Albertsdóttir 48'	Report

Kópavogsvöllur, Kópavogur
Attendance: 878
Referee: Abigail Marriott (England)

Breiðablik won 4–1 on aggregate.

1 September 2021
19:00

Vllaznia (Albania)	0–2	(Italy) Juventus
	Report	Girelli 12'; Hurtig 44'

Loro Boriçi Stadium, Shkodër
Attendance: 550
Referee: Sabina Bolić (Croatia)
9 September 2021
20:00

Juventus (Italy)	1–0	(Albania) Vllaznia
Stašková 34'	Report

Juventus Training Ground, Turin
Attendance: 0
Referee: Henrikke Nervik (Norway)

Juventus won 3–0 on aggregate.

31 August 2021
19:30

Twente (Netherlands)	1–1	(Portugal) Benfica
Kalma 41'	Report	Cameirão 18'

FC Twente Stadion, Enschede
Attendance: 1,029
Referee: Eleni Antoniou (Greece)
9 September 2021
20:00 (19:00 WEST)

Benfica (Portugal)	4–0	(Netherlands) Twente
Lacasse 43', 50', 72'; Nycole Raysla 47'	Report

Futebol Campus, Seixal
Attendance: 627
Referee: Eszter Urbán (Hungary)

Benfica won 5–1 on aggregate.

31 August 2021
17:00 (18:00 EEST)

Apollon Limassol (Cyprus)	1–2	(Ukraine) Zhytlobud-1 Kharkiv
Freda 29'	Report	Ovdiychuk 11'; Boychenko 88'

Tsirion Stadium, Limassol
Attendance: 250
Referee: Catarina Campos (Portugal)
9 September 2021
17:00 (18:00 EEST)

Zhytlobud-1 Kharkiv (Ukraine)	3–1	(Cyprus) Apollon Limassol
Boychenko 15'; Ovdiychuk 20', 62'	Report	Aleksanyan 66' (o.g.)

OSC Metalist, Kharkiv
Attendance: 2000
Referee: Petra Pavlíková (Slovakia)

Zhytlobud-1 Kharkiv won 5–2 on aggregate.

1 September 2021
20:00

Servette Chênois (Switzerland)	1–1	(Scotland) Glasgow City
Boho 50'	Report	Chinchilla 66'

Stade de Genève, Geneva
Attendance: 2,487
Referee: Iuliana Demetrescu (Romania)
8 September 2021
16:00 (15:00 BST)

Glasgow City (Scotland)	1–2	(Switzerland) Servette Chênois
Chinchilla 14'	Report	Boho 42'; Maendly 46'

Broadwood, Cumbernauld
Attendance: 617
Referee: Shona Shukrula (Netherlands)

Servette Chênois won 3–2 on aggregate.

1 September 2021
19:00

Vålerenga (Norway)	1–3	(Sweden) BK Häcken
Madsen 82'	Report	Angeldal 32', 45'; Blackstenius 64'

Vålerenga Stadion, Oslo
Attendance: 514
Referee: Galiya Echeva (Bulgaria)
8 September 2021
19:00

BK Häcken (Sweden)	3–2	(Norway) Vålerenga
Blackstenius 39', 52'; Rytting Kaneryd 78'	Report	Jensen 73'; Stengel 88'

Hisingen Arena, Gothenburg
Attendance: 1,134
Referee: Angelika Söder (Germany)

BK Häcken won 6–3 on aggregate.

==== League Path ====
1 September 2021
21:00

Levante (Spain)	1–2	(France) Lyon
Crivelari 86'	Report	Malard 80'; Morroni 84'

Ciutat de València, Valencia
Attendance: 4,338
Referee: Jelena Međedović (Serbia)
8 September 2021
18:00

Lyon (France)	2–1	(Spain) Levante
Majri 60'; Macario 63'	Report	Cometti 64'

OL Training Center, Décines
Attendance: 1,016
Referee: Rebecca Welch (England)

Lyon won 4–2 on aggregate.

31 August 2021
20:30 (19:30 BST)

Arsenal (England)	3–0	(Czech Republic) Slavia Prague
Parris 2'; Little 31' (pen.); Miedema 72'	Report

Meadow Park, Borehamwood
Attendance: 1,018
Referee: Maria Marotta (Italy)
9 September 2021
18:30

Slavia Prague (Czech Republic)	0–4	(England) Arsenal
	Report	Miedema 60', 70', 72'; Little 76' (pen.)

Eden Arena, Prague
Attendance: 2,155
Referee: Reelika Turi (Estonia)

Arsenal won 7–0 on aggregate.

31 August 2021
21:00

Real Madrid (Spain)	1–1	(England) Manchester City
Robles 90+2'	Report	Weir 47'

Alfredo Di Stéfano, Madrid
Attendance: 707
Referee: Sandra Bastos (Portugal)
8 September 2021
20:00 (19:00 BST)

Manchester City (England)	0–1	(Spain) Real Madrid
	Report	Zornoza 44'

MCFC Academy Stadium, Manchester
Attendance: 1,360
Referee: Riem Hussein (Germany)

Real Madrid won 2–1 on aggregate.

1 September 2021
18:00

VfL Wolfsburg (Germany)	3–2	(France) Bordeaux
Pajor 13'; Roord 19'; Janssen 60'	Report	Snoeijs 14'; Cardia 70'

AOK Stadion, Wolfsburg
Attendance: 637
Referee: Lorraine Watson (Scotland)
8 September 2021
19:00

Bordeaux (France)	3–2 (a.e.t.)	(Germany) VfL Wolfsburg
Snoeijs 36'; Gomes 67'; Cardia 119'	Report	Pajor 25', 102'
Penalties
Périsset (penalty missed); Bilbault (penalty missed); Folkertsma (penalty missed)	0–3	(penalty scored) Oberdorf; (penalty scored) Pajor; (penalty scored) Doorsoun

J. Amoueix, Libourne
Attendance: 2,502
Referee: María Dolores Martínez Madrona (Spain)

5–5 on aggregate. VfL Wolfsburg won after penalties.

31 August 2021
19:00

Rosengård (Sweden)	0–3	(Germany) 1899 Hoffenheim
	Report	De Caigny 29'; Wienroither 71'; Hagel 90+3'

Malmö Idrottsplats, Malmö
Attendance: 600
Referee: Marta Frias Acedo (Spain)
8 September 2021
19:00

1899 Hoffenheim (Germany)	3–3	(Sweden) Rosengård
Wienroither 8'; Linder 27'; Brand 67'	Report	Čanković 17'; Larsson 65'; Kullashi 89'

Dietmar-Hopp-Stadion, Hoffenheim
Attendance: 847
Referee: Jelena Cvetković (Serbia)

1899 Hoffenheim won 6–3 on aggregate.
