= 2024–25 Bosnia and Herzegovina Women's Premier League =

Bosnia and Herzegovina women's football league season

Premier League
- Season: 2024–25
- Dates: 1 September 2024 – 18 May 2025
- Champions: SFK 2000
- Champions League: SFK 2000
- Matches: 59
- Goals: 217 (3.68 per match)
- All statistics correct as of 18 May 2025.

The 2024–25 season of the Premier League is the 24th season of the top-tier women's football league in Bosnia and Herzegovina.

SFK 2000 are the defending champions, as their dominance of the Premier League continued in the 2023–24 season with their 22nd title.

The schedule of the 2024–25 season has been published alongside the provisions on 26 June 2024. The first matchday bouts were to be played on 31 August and 1 September 2024, but the 31 August 2024 match was postponed. The regular season should conclude with the 14th matchday on 22 and 23 March 2025. The subsequent championship round and qualification round are scheduled from 12 April 2025 to 18 May 2025. The matchups for the first half of the regular season have been drawn on 3 July 2024.

== Tiebreakers for league ranking ==
Different criteria are applied to determine the order of the teams in all rounds of the league depending on the state of the league.

While a league round is in progress, the order of the teams is determined according to the following criteria:

1. The total number of points;
2. Goal difference in all league matches;
3. Number of goals scored in all league matches;

When a league round has concluded, the order of the teams is determined according to the following criteria:

1. The total number of points;
2. Number of points earned in head-to-head matches;
3. Goal difference in head-to-head matches with away goals counted twice;
4. Number of goals scored in head-to-head matches;
5. Goal difference in head-to-head matches (with home and away goals counted the same);

If two or more teams are still tied after all the above criteria, a play-off match or tournament is organised to determine the order.

== Teams ==
Locations of teams in the 2024–25 Premier League.

Team	Home city	Home ground	Capacity	2023–24 finish
Emina Mostar	Mostar	Stadion Rođeni	7,000	2nd
Iskra Bugojno	Bugojno	Stadion Jaklić	12,000	4th
Leotar	Trebinje	Stadion Police	8,550	1st (1. ŽL RS)
Libero	Goražde	Stadion Midhat Drljević	4,000	5th
Radnik Bumerang	Bijeljina	Gradski stadion	6,000	3rd
SFK 2000	Sarajevo	TC FK Sarajevo – Butmir	1,000	1st
Sloboda Tuzla	Tuzla	Stadion Tušanj	7,200	6th
Vogošća	Sarajevo	Stadion Hakija Mršo	1,200	1st (1. ŽL FBiH)

=== Team changes ===
Entering league		Exiting league	
Promoted from 2023 to 2024 Prva ženska liga FBiH	Promoted from 2023 to 2024 Prva ženska Liga RS	Relegated to 2024–25 Prva ženska liga FBiH	Relegated to 2024–25 Prva ženska Liga RS
Vogošća	Leotar	Fortuna Živinice	Spartak 2013

== Regular season ==
=== League table ===
Pos	Team	Pld	W	D	L	GF	GA	GD	Pts	Qualification
1	SFK 2000	12	12	0	0	67	1	+66	36	Advances to championship round
2	Emina Mostar	12	7	2	3	20	9	+11	23	Advances to championship round
3	Radnik Bumerang	12	6	1	5	17	18	−1	19	Advances to championship round
4	Leotar	12	5	2	5	16	21	−5	17	Advances to championship round
5	Libero	12	4	2	6	14	26	−12	14	Participates in qualification round
6	Iskra Bugojno	12	2	3	7	8	26	−18	9	Participates in qualification round
7	Sloboda Tuzla (Note: Sloboda Tuzla -3)	12	1	0	11	2	43	−41	0	Participates in qualification round
8	Vogošća	0	0	0	0	0	0	0	0	Participates in qualification round

Updated to match(es) played on 26 March 2025. Source: NFSBiH.ba
Rules for classification: Tiebreakers

=== Results ===
Home \ Away	EMI	ISK	LEO	LIB	RAD	SFK	SLO	VOG
Emina Mostar		0–0	1–0	3–0	1–0	0–3	4–0	
Iskra Bugojno	1–2		1–5	1–1	1–2	0–5	0–1	
Leotar	0–0	0–1		2–0	0–3	0–8	2–0	
Libero	3–1	1–1	0–1		3–1	0–3	2–0	
Radnik Bumerang	0–2	1–0	1–1	2–1		0–5	3–0 bye	
SFK 2000	2–1	8–0	5–0	11–0	4–0		5–0	
Sloboda Tuzla	0–5	0–2	1–5	0–3	0–4	0–8		
Vogošća								

Updated to match(es) played on 26 March 2025. Source: NFSBiH.ba
Legend: Blue = home team win; Yellow = draw; Red = away team win.

== Championship round ==
=== League table ===
Pos	Team	Pld	W	D	L	GF	GA	GD	Pts	Qualification
1	SFK 2000 (C, Q)	18	17	1	0	97	3	+94	52	Champions League qualifying round 1
2	Emina Mostar	18	9	4	5	27	18	+9	31	
3	Radnik Bumerang	18	7	2	9	22	38	−16	23	
4	Leotar	18	6	4	8	21	37	−16	22	

Source: NFSBiH.ba
Rules for classification: Tiebreakers
(C) Champions; (Q) Qualified for the phase indicated

=== Results ===
Home \ Away	SFK	EMI	RAD	LEO
SFK 2000		3–0	11–0	7–0
Emina Mostar	2–2		1–2	2–1
Radnik Bumerang	0–2	1–2		1–1
Leotar	0–5	0–0	3–1	

Updated to match(es) played on 18 May 2025. Source: NFSBiH.ba
Legend: Blue = home team win; Yellow = draw; Red = away team win.

== Qualification round ==
=== League table ===
Pos	Team	Pld	W	D	L	GF	GA	GD	Pts	Relegation
1	Libero	15	6	2	7	25	29	−4	20	
2	Iskra Bugojno	16	5	3	8	23	30	−7	18	
3	Sloboda Tuzla (Note: Sloboda Tuzla -3) (R)	15	1	0	14	2	62	−60	0	Relegation to 2025–26 Prva ženska liga FBiH or Prva ženska Liga RS
4	Vogošća	0	0	0	0	0	0	0	0	Relegation to 2025–26 Prva ženska liga FBiH or Prva ženska Liga RS

Updated to match(es) played on 17 May 2025. Source: NFSBiH.ba
Rules for classification: Tiebreakers
(R) Relegated

=== Results ===
Home \ Away	LIB	ISK	SLO	VOG
Libero		2–3		
Iskra Bugojno	0–2		11–0	
Sloboda Tuzla	0–7	0–1		
Vogošća				

Updated to match(es) played on 17 May 2025. Source: NFSBiH.ba
Legend: Blue = home team win; Yellow = draw; Red = away team win.

== Top scorers ==
As of 18 May 2025

Rank	Player	Club	Goals
1	(Bosnia and Herzegovina) Mejrema Medić	SFK 2000	13
2	(Bosnia and Herzegovina) Alma Krajnić	SFK 2000	13
3	(Bosnia and Herzegovina) Alisa Spahić	SFK 2000	11
4	(Bosnia and Herzegovina) Veronika Terzić	SFK 2000	10
5	(Bosnia and Herzegovina) Elma Husić	Emina Mostar	9
6	(Montenegro) Katarina Čađenović	SFK 2000	8
7	(Bosnia and Herzegovina) Amela Kršo	SFK 2000	8
8	(Bosnia and Herzegovina) Staša Đokić	Leotar	8
