= Sabrina Buljubašić =

Bosnian association football player

Director of FK Sarajevo
- In office 20 August 2016 – 24 October 2021
- Preceded by: Dino Selimović

Personal details
- Born: 30 September 1988 (age 38) Tuzla, SR Bosnia and Herzegovina, SFR Yugoslavia
- Education: AUBiH; ISDE in Madrid
- Occupation: Former Director of FK Sarajevo; Former football player; International Sports Lawyer
Association football career
- Position: Defender
Senior career*
Years	Team	Apps	(Gls)
2009–2012	Salt City Tuzla		
2012–2014	SFK 2000		
International career
2012–2013	Bosnia and Herzegovina	6	(1)
- * Club domestic league appearances and goals

Sabrina Buljubašić (born 30 September 1988) is a Bosnian retired professional footballer, international sports lawyer, professor and first female CEO of a Men's football club in the Balkans, FK Sarajevo From Bosnia and Herzegovina. Sabrina stepped down from the position in October 2021 after 5 years and known for winning the club's first ever historic Double Title (Championship and Cup), first ever back to back title and in 5 years achieved 4 trophies under her mandate. Recently (prior to her departure), she signed the first ever deal with the municipality to control the stadium for 45 years. As well, the club was left with financial complications and prior to her departure, she helped find the investors that took over the ownership and saved the club from bankruptcy. She is known as a professor for sports law and management in Spain and a common guest speaker at international events.

== Early life and education ==
Buljubašić was born in the industrial city of Tuzla, before emigrating with her family to the United States at the age of five during the Bosnian War. Her family settled in Vancouver, Washington, where she was first introduced to football. After captaining her high school varsity team, Buljubašić declined numerous scholarship offers in the United States, choosing to relocate to Bosnia and Herzegovina and continue her studies there, enrolling in the American University in Bosnia and Herzegovina (AUBiH) where she earned a degree in international relations and Legal Studies from State University of NY.

She further graduated from the Instituto Superior de Derecho y Economía (ISDE - the Graduate School of Law and Economy) in Madrid with an international master's degree in Sports Law and Management.

== Playing career ==
While studying, Buljubašić simultaneously established ŽNK Salt City Tuzla, the first women's football club in her home town, going on to captain it and hold the position of vice-chairwoman for three years. In 2012, she joined Bosnian powerhouse SFK 2000 with whom she won a league and cup double and reached the Round of 32 in the UEFA Women's Champions League.

At this time Buljubašić also represented Bosnia and Herzegovina internationally, earning six caps and scoring one goal. Soon after she retired at the age of only 26, after she was named the Director of FK Sarajevo.

== Administrative career ==
After working as the Head of legal and columnist for varies football organisations including FIFA and the NWSL, as well as being an adviser for women's football in the Football Association of Bosnia and Herzegovina, Buljubašić was named director of Sarajevo upon the request of club owner, billionaire and chairman of Berjaya Group, Vincent Tan in August 2016, thus becoming the first woman to hold a management position in the club's history and one of the only in the whole Balkan region. Buljubašić was the first club director to win the double title in 2018/2019 and the first back to back title in 2020. On 30 September 2020, it was confirmed that Buljubašić would extend and additional mandate as the clubs director for another term of 4 years. She served as Sarajevo's director until 24 October 2021 when she decided to step down after saving the club from financial crisis by managing a new investment and takeover of two investors. She left the club after 5 years, 4 trophies, and the clubs first municipality stadium takeover.

== Honours ==
=== Player ===
SFK 2000

- Bosnian Women's Premier League: 2012–13, 2013–14
- Bosnian Women's Cup: 2012–13, 2013–14
