= Samira Hurem =

Bosnian football manager (born 1972)

Personal information
- Date of birth: 14 November 1972 (age 53)
- Place of birth: Sarajevo, SFR Yugoslavia
- Height: 1.68 m (5 ft 6 in)
- Position: Midfielder

Youth career
- 1982–1991: ŽFK Željezničar

Senior career*
Years	Team	Apps	(Gls)
1991–1994	ŽFK Željezničar		
2000–2006	SFK 2000		

International career
1996–2006	Bosnia and Herzegovina	24	(8)

Managerial career
- 2010–2025: SFK 2000
- 2011–2024: Bosnia and Herzegovina
- * Club domestic league appearances and goals

Samira Hurem (born 14 November 1972) is a Bosnian professional football manager and former player, best known for managing Bosnian Women's Premier League club SFK 2000 from 2010 to 2025. She was also the manager of the Bosnia and Herzegovina women's national team from 2011 until 2024.

Hurem is Bosnia and Herzegovina's most successful women's football manager, having won more trophies than any other manager in the history of Bosnian women's football.

== Honours ==
=== Player ===
SFK 2000

- Bosnian Women's Premier League: 2002–03, 2003–04, 2004–05, 2005–06
- Bosnian Women's Cup: (2001–02 or 2002–03), 2003–04, 2005–06

=== Manager ===
SFK 2000

- Bosnian Women's Premier League: 2010–11, 2011–12, 2012–13, 2013–14, 2014–15, 2015–16, 2016–17, 2017–18, 2018–19, 2019–20, 2020–21, 2021–22, 2022–23, 2023–24, 2024–25
- Bosnian Women's Cup: 2010–11, 2011–12, 2012–13, 2013–14, 2014–15, 2015–16, 2016–17, 2017–18, 2018–19, 2020–21, 2021–22, 2022–23, 2023–24, 2024–25

=== Individual ===
- Bosnian Coach of the Year: 2016
