= Amira Spahić =

Bosnian footballer

Personal information
- Full name: Amira Spahić
- Date of birth: 8 June 1983 (age 43)
- Place of birth: Travnik, SFR Yugoslavia
- Height: 1.65 m (5 ft 5 in)
- Position: Midfielder

Team information
- Current team: SFK 2000
- Number: 8

Youth career
- –2003: Travnik

Senior career*
Years	Team	Apps	(Gls)
2003–2009	Travnik		
2009–	SFK 2000		

International career^{‡}
2009–	Bosnia and Herzegovina	35	(0)
- * Club domestic league appearances and goals ‡ National team caps and goals as of 12 June 2018

Amira Spahić (born 8 June 1983) is a Bosnian professional football midfielder who plays for Bosnia and Herzegovina Women's Premier League club SFK 2000 and the Bosnia and Herzegovina women's national team.

== Honours ==
=== Club ===
Travnik

- Bosnian Women's Cup: 2004–05

SFK 2000

- Bosnian Women's Premier League: 2010–11, 2011–12, 2012–13, 2013–14, 2014–15, 2015–16, 2016–17, 2017–18, 2018–19
- Bosnian Women's Cup: 2010–11, 2011–12, 2012–13, 2013–14, 2014–15, 2015–16, 2016–17, 2017–18, 2018–19
