= Emina Mostar =

Women's football club in Bosnia and Herzegovina

- Full name: ŽFK/NK Emina Mostar (Emina Mostar WFC)
- Short name: Emina
- Founded: 9 May 2016 (10 years ago)
- Ground: Rođeni Stadium
- Capacity: 7,000
- President: Sevda Tojaga
- Manager: Zijo Tojaga
- League: Women's Premier League BH
- 2025–26: Women's Premier League BH, 2nd
- Website: https://zfnkemina.com/
Home colours	Away colours	Third colours

Ženski fudbalski/nogometni klub Emina Mostar (English: Women's football club Emina Mostar), ŽF/NK Emina Mostar, is a women's professional football club from the city of Mostar, Bosnia and Herzegovina. The club competes in the highest level of women's football in Bosnia and Herzegovina, the Bosnia and Herzegovina Women's Premier League. The club was established in May 2016 and the name was taken from a famous woman from Mostar, Emina Sefić. It competed in the Second Federal League of BiH (South) in the 2016/2017 season, then in the First Federal League of BiH, and now it is member of the highest level of competition, the Premier League. In the 2016/2017 season, Emina was finalist of the BiH Cup.

== Honours ==
=== Domestic competitions ===
==== League ====
- Bosnia and Herzegovina Women's Premier League (0):

==== Cups ====
- Bosnia and Herzegovina Women's Football Cup (0) :

== Staff ==
=== Club management ===
As of December 2025

Current staff
- President: Sevda Tojaga
- Secretary: Irena Bjelica
- Director/Manager: Zijo Tojaga
- Assistant Manager: Dragica Denda
- Conditioning Coach: Davor Grabovac

== Players ==
=== Current squad ===
As of 22 October 2022

Note: Flags indicate national team as defined under FIFA eligibility rules; some limited exceptions apply. Players may hold more than one non-FIFA nationality.

No.	Pos.	Nation	Player
1		BIH	Indira Faković
2		BIH	Dragica Denda (Captain)
3		BIH	Minela Gačanica
4		BIH	Elma Husić
5		BIH	Ana Bojanić
6		BIH	Amra Isaković
7		BIH	Marinela Lovrić
8		BIH	Đula Velagić
9		BIH	Alma Isaković
10		BIH	Frančeska Šimić
11		MNE	Irena Bjelica
12		BIH	Maja Hrelja
13		BIH	Ilvana Begović
14		BIH	Amela Kršo
15		BIH	Sara Kreča
16		BIH	Sabira Demirović
