= Amela Kršo =

Bosnian footballer

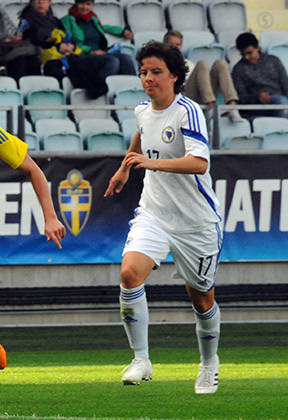
- Kršo plying for Bosnia and Herzegovina in 2014

Personal information
- Full name: Amela Kršo
- Date of birth: 17 April 1991 (age 35)
- Place of birth: Foča, SFR Yugoslavia
- Height: 1.72 m (5 ft 7 1/2 in)
- Position: Striker

Team information
- Current team: SFK 2000
- Number: 17

Senior career*
Years	Team	Apps	(Gls)
2007–2013	SFK 2000		
2013–2014	Banja Luka		
2014	Ferencváros Budapest		
2015–2016	Turbine Potsdam	5	(1)
2015–2016	Turbine Potsdam II	4	(1)
2016–	SFK 2000		

International career^{‡}
2009–	Bosnia and Herzegovina	38	(1)
- * Club domestic league appearances and goals ‡ National team caps and goals as of 4 September 2018

Amela Kršo (born 17 April 1991) is a Bosnian professional football striker who currently plays for SFK 2000 in the Bosnia and Herzegovina Women's Premier League and the Bosnia and Herzegovina women's national team.

== Club career ==
Kršo started her career and played years at SFK 2000 in Sarajevo, Bosnia and Herzegovina. She was named Bosnian Women's Premier League Player of the Year in 2011. With SFK, she won six Bosnian women's Premier Leagues and also six Bosnian women's cups.

In 2013 she switched to league rival Banja Luka. After leaving Banja Luka in 2014, Kršo played some months in Hungary for Ferencváros Budapest.

In 2015, she signed for German side Turbine Potsdam. In 2016 she left Potsdam and came back to SFK 2000 where she has been playing ever since.

== International career ==
Since 2009, Kršo has been playing for the Bosnia and Herzegovina women's national team.

== Honours ==
=== Player ===
SFK 2000

- Bosnian Women's Premier League: 2007–08, 2008–09, 2009–10, 2010–11, 2011–12, 2012–13, 2016–17, 2017–18, 2018–19
- Bosnian Women's Cup: 2007–08, 2008–09, 2009–10, 2010–11, 2011–12, 2012–13, 2016–17, 2017–18, 2018–19

=== Individual ===
Awards

- Bosnian Women's Premier League Player of the Year: 2011
