= Valéria (footballer, born 1998) =

Brazilian footballer

Personal information
- Full name: Valéria Cantuário da Silva
- Date of birth: 10 September 1998 (age 28)
- Place of birth: Teresina, Piauí, Brazil
- Height: 1.58 m (5 ft 2 in)
- Positions: Forward; winger

Team information
- Current team: Benfica
- Number: 7

Senior career*
Years	Team	Apps	(Gls)
2015	São Paulo Piauí		
2016–2018	Tiradentes Piauí	10	(11)
2018	Audax	21	(7)
2018	Vitória	5	(13)
2019	São Paulo	30	(11)
2020–2021	Madrid CFF	36	(8)
2021–	Benfica	26	(7)

International career^{‡}
2018	Brazil U20	5	(1)
2020–	Brazil	1	(1)
- * Club domestic league appearances and goals as of 17 Feb 2023 ‡ National team caps and goals as of 17 Feb 2023

Valéria Cantuário da Silva (born 10 September 1998), simply known as Valéria, is a Brazilian footballer who plays as a forward or a winger for Portuguese club Benfica and the Brazil women's national team.

== Club career ==
Valéria has played for AE São Paulo, SE Tiradentes, Grêmio Osasco Audax EC, EC Vitória and São Paulo FC in Brazil and for Madrid CFF in Spain.

== International career ==
Valéria represented Brazil at the 2018 FIFA U-20 Women's World Cup. She made her senior debut on 28 November 2020.
