= Heiðdís Lillýardóttir =

Icelandic footballer

Personal information
- Full name: Heiðdís Lillýardóttir
- Date of birth: February 28, 1996 (age 30)
- Place of birth: Iceland
- Height: 1.74 m (5 ft 9 in)
- Position: Centre-back

Team information
- Current team: FC Basel Frauen
- Number: 4

Senior career*
Years	Team	Apps	(Gls)
2009–2015	Höttur		
2015–2017	Selfoss	35	(0)
2017–2023	Breiðablik	118	(6)
2022	→ Benfica (loan)	2	(0)
2023–	Basel	10	(1)

International career^{‡}
2014–2015	Iceland	6	(2)
- * Club domestic league appearances and goals as of 29 July 2023 ‡ National team caps and goals as of 29 July 2023

Heiðdís Lillýardóttir (born 28 February 1996) is an Icelandic footballer who plays as a centre-back for Breiðablik.

== Honours ==
Selfoss

- Icelandic Cup; runner-up: 2015

Breiðablik

- Besta deild kvenna (2): 2018, 2020
- Icelandic Cup (2): 2018, 2021; runner-up: 2022
- Icelandic Super Cup (2): 2019, 2022
