= Karitas Tómasdóttir =

Icelandic footballer

Personal information
- Date of birth: 19 September 1995 (age 31)
- Height: 1.67 m (5 ft 6 in)
- Position: Midfielder

Team information
- Current team: Breiðablik
- Number: 17

College career
Years	Team	Apps	(Gls)
2015–2018	TCU Horned Frogs	82	(4)

Senior career*
Years	Team	Apps	(Gls)
2013–2020	Selfoss	92	(1)
2021–	Breiðablik	38	(11)

International career^{‡}
2014	Iceland U19	7	(0)
2021–	Iceland	9	(0)
- * Club domestic league appearances and goals as of 19:34, 20 October 2023 (UTC) ‡ National team caps and goals as of 19:35, 20 October 2023 (UTC)

Karitas Tómasdóttir (born 19 September 1995) is an Icelandic footballer who plays as a midfielder for Breiðablik and the Iceland national team.

== Career ==
Tómasdóttir debuted with the Iceland national team in 2021. While studying in the United States between 2015 and 2018, she played football for Texas Christian University.
