= Bosnia and Herzegovina Women's Premier League =

Top tier association football women's league, Bosnia and Herzegovina

- Founded: 2001
- Country: Bosnia and Herzegovina
- Confederation: UEFA
- Divisions: 1
- Number of clubs: 8
- Level on pyramid: 1
- Domestic cup: National Cup
- International cup: UEFA Champions League
- Current champions: SFK 2000 (24th title) (2025–26)
- Most championships: SFK 2000 (24 titles)
- Website: Official website
- Current: 2026–27 Premier League

Bosnia and Herzegovina Women's Premier League (Bosnian/Croatian/Serbian: Ženska Premijer Liga BiH) is the top level women's football league of Bosnia and Herzegovina. Since 2013 the league has been unified. Before it was played in two separate groups based on league systems confined within Bosnia's entities, one being the First Women's League of the Federation of Bosnia and Herzegovina and the other First Women's League of the Republika Srpska, with the champion being decided through play-offs.

The winner of the play-off qualified for a spot in the UEFA Women's Champions League.

The league draws little media attention in Bosnia and Herzegovina, while the funding is often inadequate and clubs lack infrastructure, in some cases even basic training facilities.

== History ==
Until 2013 the league was divided into the NFSBiH league and the league of the Republic of Srpska. The best two teams of the NFSBiH league qualified for a play-off in which the champion of the Republika Srpska women's football championship joined. The venue for the play-off was decided beforehand and it was played as three-team group.

== Format ==
The eight teams play against three times, twice at home and one away - in a total of 21 rounds. The champion qualifies for the next season of UEFA Women's Champions League. The two worst placed teams are relegated to its respective second tier (Prva ženska liga FBiH or Prva ženska Liga RS).

== 2022–23 teams ==
The 2022–23 season is played by eight teams.

Locations of the Bosnian First League teams

Team	Home city	Home ground
Borac Banja Luka	Banja Luka	Gradski Stadion Banja Luka
Emina Mostar	Mostar	Stadion Rođeni
Fortuna Živinice	Živinice	
Iskra	Bugojno	Stadion Jaklić
Libero	Goražde	Stadion Midhat Drljević
Lokomotiva	Brčko	Stadion FK Lokomotiva Brčko
Radnik Bumerang	Bijeljina	Gradski Stadion Bijeljina
SFK 2000	Sarajevo	Butmir Training Centre

== List of champions ==
The list of champions

- 2001–02: ŽNK Iskra Bugojno
- 2002–03: SFK 2000
- 2003–04: SFK 2000
- 2004–05: SFK 2000
- 2005–06: SFK 2000
- 2006–07: SFK 2000
- 2007–08: SFK 2000
- 2008–09: SFK 2000
- 2009–10: SFK 2000
- 2010–11: SFK 2000
- 2011–12: SFK 2000
- 2012–13: SFK 2000
- 2013–14: SFK 2000
- 2014–15: SFK 2000
- 2015–16: SFK 2000
- 2016–17: SFK 2000
- 2017–18: SFK 2000
- 2018–19: SFK 2000
- 2019–20: SFK 2000
- 2020–21: SFK 2000
- 2021–22: SFK 2000
- 2022–23: SFK 2000
- 2023–24: SFK 2000
- 2024–25: SFK 2000
- 2025–26: SFK 2000

== Titles by team ==
Club	Titles
SFK 2000	24
Iskra Bugojno	1
