= SFK 2000 =

Women's football club in Sarajevo

- Full name: ŽFK SFK 2000 Sarajevo
- Nickname: Bordo dame (Maroon Ladies)
- Founded: 18 June 2000; 26 years ago
- Ground: Butmir Training Centre
- Owner(s): Ismir Mirvić (98.26%); Others (1.74%)
- Chairman: Samira Hurem
- Manager: Valentin Plavčić
- League: Women's Premier League BH
- 2025–26: Women's Premier League BH, 1st
- Website: https://sfk2000.ba/
Home colours	Away colours

SFK 2000 Sarajevo (Bosnian: ŽFK 2000 Sarajevo) is a women's professional football club from the city of Sarajevo that is situated in Bosnia and Herzegovina. The club competes in the highest level of women's football in Bosnia and Herzegovina, the Bosnia and Herzegovina Women's Premier League. The club was established in June 2000; the name was chosen from a lower-tier men's football club which is now defunct.

Following its foundation, the club quickly won the national championship, and has subsequently dominated women's football in the country, winning 24 consecutive titles so far. The club has participated in the UEFA Women's Cup from 2003 onwards and has reached the final rounds four times. In the 2009–10 UEFA Women's Champions League, when the competition was rebranded and reorganized, the side started in the round of 32 but lost to Russia's Zvezda 2005 Perm 8–0 on aggregate. In the next two years the team had to go through the qualifying phase, failing both times, but in the 2012–13 UEFA Women's Champions League they managed to qualify after hosting the qualifying phase in Sarajevo and defeating two clubs which played the round of 32 of the previous season of the Women's champions league.

The club advanced to the round of 32 once again, this time in the 2018–19 UEFA Women's Champions League season, but got eliminated by Chelsea 11–0 on aggregate.

On 4 July 2015, SFK 2000 signed an agreement on long-term cooperation with Bosnian men's football club FK Sarajevo, by which SFK 2000 assumed the latter's maroon and white colors, club logo and kit. FK Sarajevo board members entered the SFK 2000 board, by which the two clubs became to de facto function as one.

== Honours ==
=== Domestic competitions ===
- Bosnia and Herzegovina Women's Premier League (24): 2002–03 to 2025–26 (Record)
- Bosnia and Herzegovina Women's Cup (21) : (2001–02 or 2002–03), 2003–04, 2005–06 to 2018–19, 2020–21 to 2024–25 (Record)
- Bosnia and Herzegovina Women's Supercup (3): 1998, 2000, 2001 (Record)

== Players ==
=== Current squad ===
As of 30 August 2025

Note: Flags indicate national team as defined under FIFA eligibility rules; some limited exceptions apply. Players may hold more than one non-FIFA nationality.

No.	Pos.	Nation	Player
1	GK	BIH	Envera Hasanbegović
3	DF	BIH	Dalal Bratović
4	DF	SRB	Miljana Smiljković
5	DF	BIH	Natalija Mirković
6	DF	BIH	Đula Velagić
7	FW	MNE	Jelena Petrović
8	DF	BIH	Ajla Zukić
9	FW	ENG	Jones-Baidoe Lili Orchid Nancy
10	MF	BIH	Alisa Spahić (captain)
11	FW	COL	Gisela Arrieta
12	GK	BIH	Hana Karačić
13	DF	BIH	Lamija Bjelica
14	FW	BIH	Farah Jusufović

No.	Pos.	Nation	Player
15	MF	USA	Taylor Harrison
16	MF	MNE	Katarina Čađenović
17	FW	BIH	Amela Kršo
18	DF	BIH	Mia Kuljanin
19	MF	BIH	Amila Abdukić
20	MF	CRO	Veronika Terzić
21	GK	BIH	Nadija Golubović
22	MF	BIH	Uma Hadžihajdarević
23	MF	CRO	Petra Pezelj
24	DF	BIH	Andrea Gavrić
26	FW	BIH	Marija Šekarić
77	DF	BIH	Alma Kamerić

== Club officials ==
=== Club management ===
Current staff
- Chairman: Samira Hurem
- Vice-chairman: Anes Salibegović
- General secretary: Azra Numanović
- Board chairman: Hajrudin Kapetanović
- Board member: Kristina Šešlija
- Board member: Ferid Mušić
- Board member: Vildana Imamović

== UEFA competitions record ==
Season	Competition	Stage	Result	Opponent
2003–04	Women's Cup	Qualifying Stage	0–3	(Croatia) ZNK Osijek
2003–04	Women's Cup	Qualifying Stage	2–1	(Wales) Cardiff City
2003–04	Women's Cup	Qualifying Stage	2–3	(Kazakhstan) Temir Zholy
2004–05	Women's Cup	Qualifying Stage	0–4	(Switzerland) Zuchwil
2004–05	Women's Cup	Qualifying Stage	0–2	(Greece) Aegina
2004–05	Women's Cup	Qualifying Stage	5–0	(Cyprus) PAOK Ledra
2005–06	Women's Cup	Qualifying Stage	0–3	(Russia) Lada Togliatti
2005–06	Women's Cup	Qualifying Stage	1–0	(Slovenia) Krka Novo Mesto
2005–06	Women's Cup	Qualifying Stage	1–0	(Slovakia) PVFA Bratislava
2006–07	Women's Cup	Qualifying Stage	0–1	(Italy) Fiammamonza
2006–07	Women's Cup	Qualifying Stage	1–1	(Lithuania) Gintra Universitetas
2006–07	Women's Cup	Qualifying Stage	1–0	(Belarus) Universitet Vitebsk
2007–08	Women's Cup	Qualifying Stage	2–1	(North Macedonia) Skiponjat
2007–08	Women's Cup	Qualifying Stage	2–0	(Slovakia) Slovan Duslo Sala
2007–08	Women's Cup	Qualifying Stage	0–7	(France) Olympique Lyon
2008–09	Women's Cup	Qualifying Stage	0–0	(Republic of Ireland) Galway
2008–09	Women's Cup	Qualifying Stage	2–3	(Switzerland) Zürich
2008–09	Women's Cup	Qualifying Stage	1–2	(Belarus) Universitet Vitebsk
2009–10	Champions League	Round of 32	0–3 H, 0–5 A	(Russia) Zvezda Perm
2010–11	Champions League	Qualifying Stage	1–6	(Cyprus) Apollon Limassol
2010–11	Champions League	Qualifying Stage	1–3	(Israel) ASA Tel Aviv
2010–11	Champions League	Qualifying Stage	0–1	(Sweden) Umeå
2011–12	Champions League	Qualifying Stage	1–3	(Romania) Olimpia Cluj
2011–12	Champions League	Qualifying Stage	4–1	(Turkey) Ataşehir
2011–12	Champions League	Qualifying Stage	2–1	(Lithuania) Gintra Universitetas
2012–13	Champions League	Qualifying Stage	4–0	(Republic of Ireland) Peamount United
2012–13	Champions League	Qualifying Stage	1–0	(Wales) Cardiff
2012–13	Champions League	Qualifying Stage	1–1	(Israel) ASA Tel Aviv
2012–13	Champions League	Round of 32	0–3 H, 3–0 A	(Czech Republic) Sparta Praha
2013–14	Champions League	Qualifying Stage	3–0	(Wales) Cardiff City F.C. (women)
2013–14	Champions League	Qualifying Stage	1–2	(Turkey) Konak
2013–14	Champions League	Qualifying Stage	2–3	(Bulgaria) Sofia
2014–15	Champions League	Qualifying round	0–3	(Poland) Medyk Konin
2014–15	Champions League	Qualifying round	7–0	(North Macedonia) ŽFK Kochani
2014–15	Champions League	Qualifying round	1–0	(Finland) Åland United
2015–16	Champions League	Qualifying round	5–0	(Albania) Vllaznia Shkodër
2015–16	Champions League	Qualifying round	0–3	(Belarus) FC Minsk
2015–16	Champions League	Qualifying round	3–1	(Turkey) Konak Belediyespor
2016–17	Champions League	Qualifying round	1–0	(Israel) Ramat HaSharon
2016–17	Champions League	Qualifying round	3–0	(Latvia) Rīgas FS
2016–17	Champions League	Qualifying round	2–2	(Ukraine) Zhytlobud Kharkiv
2016–17	Champions League	Round of 32	0–0 H, 2–1 A	(Russia) Rossiyanka
2017–18	Champions League	Qualifying round	0–1	(Albania) Vllaznia
2017–18	Champions League	Qualifying round	3–0	(Luxembourg) Bettembourg
2017–18	Champions League	Qualifying round	0–3	(Greece) PAOK
2018–19	Champions League	Qualifying Stage	5–0	(Albania) Vllaznia
2018–19	Champions League	Qualifying Stage	5–0	(Moldova) Agarista-ȘS Anenii Noi
2018–19	Champions League	Qualifying Stage	2–1	(Estonia) Pärnu
2018–19	Champions League	Round of 32	0–5 H, 6–0 A	(England) Chelsea
2019–20	Champions League	Qualifying Stage	5–0	(North Macedonia) ŽFK Dragon 2014
2019–20	Champions League	Qualifying Stage	1–0	(Israel) Tel Aviv University
2019–20	Champions League	Qualifying Stage	1–3	(Iceland) Breiðablik Kópavogur
2020–21	Champions League	Qualifying Stage	4–0	(Israel) Ramat HaSharon
2020–21	Champions League	Qualifying Stage	0–2	(Ukraine) Vorskla Poltava
2021–22	Champions League	Qualifying Stage	0–1	(Luxembourg) Racing FC
2021–22	Champions League	Qualifying Stage	1–1 (5–4 p)	(Israel) Kiryat Gat
2022–23	Champions League	Qualifying Stage	4–0	(Belarus) Birkirkara
2022–23	Champions League	Qualifying Stage	2–1	(Romania) Olimpia Cluj
2022–23	Champions League	Qualifying Stage	0–7 H, 3–0 A	(Switzerland) Zürich
2023–24	Champions League	Qualifying Stage	0–4	(Croatia) Osijek
2023–24	Champions League	Qualifying Stage	5–3	(Estonia) Flora
2024–25	Champions League	Qualifying Stage	3–0	(Faroe Islands) KÍ Klaksvík
2024–25	Champions League	Qualifying Stage	0–4	(Portugal) Benfica
2025–26	Champions League	Qualifying Stage	1–2 (a.e.t.)	(Belgium) OH Leuven
2025–26	Champions League	Qualifying Stage	5–0	(North Macedonia) Ljuboten
2025–26	Europa Cup	Qualifying Stage	0–0 H, 3–3 A (3–2 p)	(Turkey) ABB Fomget
2025–26	Europa Cup	Qualifying Stage	0–2 A, 0–1 H	(Switzerland) Young Boys
2026–27	Champions League	Qualifying Stage	2–3	(Netherlands) PSV Eindhoven
2026–27	Champions League	Qualifying Stage	4–1	(Luxembourg) Racing Union
2026–27	Europa Cup	Qualifying Stage	2–3 H, TBD A	(Czech Republic) Slovan Liberec
