= Bosnia and Herzegovina Women's Football Cup =

Kup BIH Žene
- Founded: 2002
- Region: Bosnia and Herzegovina
- Current champions: SFK 2000 (21st title)
- Most championships: SFK 2000 (21 titles)
- Website: Official

The Bosnia and Herzegovina Women's Football Cup is the national women's football cup competition in Bosnia and Herzegovina.

== Format ==
The cup finals were played as single leg ties until 2013. Since 2014 the finals are contested over two legs.

== List of finals ==
The list of finals:

Additionally, SFK 2000 won a title in 2002 or 2003. With twenty-one titles they are the record champions.

Year	Winner	Result	Runner-up
2001–02			
2002–03			
2003–04	SFK 2000	3–2	ŽNK Borac
2004–05	ŽNK Travnik	7–1	ŽNK Borac
2005–06	SFK 2000	2–0	ŽNK Borac
2006–07	SFK 2000	8–0	ŽNK Borac
2007–08	SFK 2000	2–0	ŽFK Leotar Trebinje
2008–09	SFK 2000	6–0	ŽFK Zenica 2006
2009–10	SFK 2000	11–0	ŽFK Mladost Nević Polja
2010–11	SFK 2000		
2011–12	SFK 2000	6–0	ŽFK Banja Luka
2012–13	SFK 2000	3–0	ŽFK Mladost Nević Polja
2013–14	SFK 2000	4–2, 3–0	ŽFK Banja Luka
2014–15	SFK 2000	14–0, 12–0	ŽNK Emina Mostar
2015–16	SFK 2000	6–0	ŽFK Radnik Bumerang
2016–17	SFK 2000	3–1	ŽNK Emina Mostar
2017–18	SFK 2000	3–0	ŽNK Iskra Bugojno
2018–19	SFK 2000	4–0	ŽFK Lokomotiva Brčko
2019–20	Abandoned due to COVID-19 pandemic in Bosnia and Herzegovina		
2020–21	SFK 2000	3–0	ŽNK Iskra Bugojno
2021–22	SFK 2000	4–1	ŽNK Emina Mostar
2022–23	SFK 2000	1–0	ŽNK Emina Mostar
2023–24	SFK 2000	5–1	ŽFK Radnik Bumerang
2024–25	SFK 2000	1–0	ŽNK Emina Mostar

== See also ==
- Bosnia and Herzegovina Football Cup, men's edition
